= 2016 MXGP of Europe =

The 2016 MXGP of Europe was the third round of the 2016 FIM Motocross World Championship season. It was held in Valkenswaard, Netherlands on 27–28 March 2016. The race included the third rounds of the 2016 MXGP and MX2 world championships. It also included the second round of the 2016 FIM Women's Motocross World Championship and the first rounds of the 2016 UEM European 300cc Championship and 2016 UEM European 250cc Championship.

== Entry lists ==
=== Entry list ===
MXGP entry list

No.	Rider	Team	Manufacturer
7	(Estonia) Tanel Leok		KTM
8	(New Zealand) Ben Townley	Team Suzuki World MXGP	Suzuki
11	(Sweden) Filip Bengtsson	Castrol Power1 Suzuki	Suzuki
12	(Germany) Max Nagl	Rockstar Energy Husqvarna	Husqvarna
17	(Spain) Jose Butron	Marchetti Racing KTM	KTM
22	(Belgium) Kevin Strijbos	Team Suzuki World MXGP	Suzuki
23	(France) Christophe Charlier	Rockstar Energy Husqvarna	Husqvarna
24	(United Kingdom) Shaun Simpson	Wilvo Virus Performance KTM	KTM
25	(Belgium) Clement Desalle	Monster Energy Kawasaki	Kawasaki
31	(United Kingdom) Alex Snow^{3}	JK Racing Yamaha	Yamaha
32	(France) Milko Potisek	Tip Top MP32 Racing	Yamaha
37	(Estonia) Gert Krestinov	Phoenix Tools Honda	Honda
44	(United Kingdom) Elliott Banks-Browne	Team Geartec Yamaha	Yamaha
45	(United Kingdom) Jake Nicholls	Hitachi Construction Husqvarna	Husqvarna
50	(Latvia) Toms Macuks^{2}	Gebben Van Venrooij Kawasaki	Kawasaki
62	(Slovenia) Klemen Gercar	62 Motorsport Husqvarna	Husqvarna
77	(Italy) Alessandro Lupino	Team Assomotor Honda	Honda
89	(Belgium) Jeremy van Horebeek	Monster Energy Yamaha	Yamaha
90	(Belgium) Nick Triest^{3}	Rent MX Team	KTM
92	(Switzerland) Valentin Guillod	Kemea Yamaha Yamalube	Yamaha
100	(United Kingdom) Tommy Searle	Monster Energy DRT Kawasaki	Kawasaki
149	(Germany) Dennis Ullrich	Sarholz KTM	KTM
151	(Finland) Harri Kullas^{2}	Sarholz KTM	KTM
156	(Germany) Angus Heidecke	Sarholz KTM	KTM
177	(Lithuania) Arminas Jasikonis^{2}	Team Pfeil Kawasaki	Kawasaki
211	(United Kingdom) James Hutchinson^{2}	Bikesport KTM	KTM
212	(Belgium) Jeffrey Dewulf	JH MX Service	KTM
222	(Italy) Tony Cairoli	Red Bull KTM	KTM
243	(Slovenia) Tim Gajser	Honda Gariboldi	Honda
259	(Netherlands) Glenn Coldenhoff	Red Bull KTM	KTM
400	(Japan) Kei Yamamoto	Team Assomotor Honda	Honda
430	(Finland) Valterri Malin^{2}	Sarholz KTM	KTM
461	(France) Romain Febvre	Monster Energy Yamaha	Yamaha
600	(Latvia) Davis Ivanovs		Yamaha
695	(France) Steven Lenoir^{1} , ^{2}	24MX Honda	Honda
704	(United Kingdom) Ashley Wilde^{3}	Team Geartec Yamaha	Yamaha
777	(Russia) Evgeny Bobryshev	Team HRC	Honda
911	(France) Jordi Tixier^{3}	Monster Energy Kawasaki	Kawasaki
920	(Spain) Ander Valentin^{2}	F&H Racing Team	Kawasaki
999	(Portugal) Rui Gonçalves^{3}	NewHolland Ottobiano Massignani Husqvarna	Husqvarna

^{1}Steven Lenoir will stand in at 24MX Honda due to injuries for the team's riders.

^{2}Riders making their debut in the MXGP class this weekend.

^{3}Rider's entered but did not attend the grand prix for various reasons.

MX2 entry list

No.	Rider	Team	Manufacturer
6	(France) Benoit Paturel	Kemea Yamaha Yamalube	Yamaha
10	(Netherlands) Calvin Vlaanderen	HSF Logistics Motorsport	KTM
14	(Switzerland) Christophe Valente	Marchetti KTM	KTM
15	(Italy) Davide Bonini	SDM Racing Team	Husqvarna
18	(Russia) Vsevolod Brylyakov	Monster Energy DRT Kawasaki	Kawasaki
29	(Germany) Henry Jacobi	JTech Honda	Honda
40	(Italy) Simone Zecchina	CDP Cortenuova	Yamaha
41	(Latvia) Pauls Jonass	Red Bull KTM	KTM
43	(Italy) Davide de Bortoli	NewHolland Ottobiano Massignani Husqvarna	Husqvarna
46	(Netherlands) Davy Pootjes	Red Bull KTM	KTM
53	(Netherlands) Micha-Boy de Waal^{2}	Theo Eggens Racing	Kawasaki
59	(Russia) Aleksandr Tonkov	Wilvo Standing Construct Yamaha	Yamaha
64	(United States) Thomas Covington	Rockstar Energy Husqvarna	Husqvarna
66	(Spain) Iker Larranaga^{1}	CreyMert Racing Team	KTM
71	(Belgium) Damon Graulus	JTech Honda	Honda
75	(Estonia) Hardi Roosiorg^{1}	Sahkar Racing	KTM
79	(Netherlands) Jaap Corneth^{1}	Jimmy Joe's Yamaha	Yamaha
84	(Netherlands) Jeffrey Herlings	Red Bull KTM	KTM
88	(Netherlands) Frederik van der Vlist	Team HNR GPR PROMO	Kawasaki
91	(Switzerland) Jeremy Seewer	Team Suzuki World MX2	Suzuki
95	(Latvia) Roberts Justs	HSF Logistics Motorsport Team	KTM
97	(Bulgaria) Michael Ivanov	Marchetti Racing Team	KTM
99	(United Kingdom) Max Anstie	Rockstar Energy Husqvarna	Husqvarna
101	(Spain) Jorge Zaragoza	Honda Gariboldi	Honda
107	(Netherlands) Lars van Berkel	SKS Racing Husqvarna	Husqvarna
110	(France) Alexis Verhaeghe	Team VHR	Kawasaki
132	(Estonia) Karel Kutsar	Sahkar Racing	KTM
142	(Bulgaria) Ivan Petrov^{1}		KTM
152	(Bulgaria) Petar Petrov	Monster Energy Kawasaki	Kawasaki
161	(Sweden) Alvin Östlund	Wilvo Standing Construct Yamaha	Yamaha
172	(Belgium) Brent van Doninck	Kemea Yamaha Yamalube	Yamaha
189	(Netherlands) Brian Bogers	HSF Logistics Motorsport	KTM
223	(Italy) Giuseppe Tropepe	NewHolland Ottobiano Massignani Husqvarna	Husqvarna
251	(Belgium) Jens Getteman	Motocross Marketing KTM	KTM
321	(Italy) Samuele Bernardini	TM Factory Racing Team	TM
338	(France) David Herbreteau	Gariboldi Honda	Honda
474	(France) Bryan Boulard	Team VHR	Kawasaki
490	(Spain) Francesc Mataro^{1}	Team Yamaha Asio	Yamaha
747	(Italy) Michele Cervellin	Martin Junior Racing	Honda
831	(Poland) Tomasz Wysocki	JD 191 KTM	KTM
919	(United Kingdom) Ben Watson	Hitachi Construction KTM	KTM

^{1}These riders will make their MX2 class debut this weekend. ^{2}De Waal entered but did not attend the grand prix.

WMX Entry List

No.	Rider	Team	Manufacturer
2	(Sweden) Sandra Karlsson		Kawasaki
7	(Sweden) Amanda Bergkvist		KTM
8	(Italy) Kiara Fontanesi	MX Fontaracing	Yamaha
9	(Switzerland) Virginie Germond	Team Dragon Moto	Suzuki
10	(Netherlands) Lara de Kruif		KTM
18	(Australia) Madison Brown		Yamaha
19	(Poland) Joanna Miller		KTM
25	(United Kingdom) Stacey Fisher		KTM
26	(Germany) Carmen Allinger		Kawasaki
44	(Republic of Ireland) Natalie Kane	BRT Racing Team	KTM
45	(Netherlands) Gwenda Haans		Husqvarna
52	(France) Justine Charroux		Yamaha
55	(Germany) Kim Irmgartz		Suzuki
62	(Norway) Madelen Hofseth-Pedersen		Yamaha
67	(Netherlands) Britt van der Werff		Suzuki
85	(Netherlands) Nancy van der Ven		Yamaha
86	(Australia) Jessica Moore		KTM
92	(Netherlands) Mandy Koning		Honda
93	(Italy) Floriana Parrini		Honda
97	(Netherlands) Demi Goezinnen	Jimmy Joe's	Yamaha
99	(France) Manon Haudoire		Yamaha
100	(Netherlands) Eline Burgmans		KTM
110	(Germany) Stephanie Laier		KTM
111	(Germany) Anne Borchers		Suzuki
114	(France) Livia Lancelot	Team One One Four	Kawasaki
116	(Italy) Francesca Nocera		Suzuki
130	(France) Jessie Joineau		Honda
131	(Italy) Giorgia Montini		Honda
137	(France) Lisa Guerber		Yamaha
141	(Denmark) Line Dam		Honda
143	(Netherlands) Stephanie Stoutjesdijk		Husqvarna
146	(Netherlands) Britt van der Wekken		KTM
151	(New Zealand) Courtney Duncan		Yamaha
174	(Italy) Giorgia Giudici	NewHolland 8biano Massignani Husqvarna	Husqvarna
178	(United Kingdom) Amie Goodlad		Yamaha
185	(Germany) Vanessa Danz	Sarholz KTM	KTM
188	(Netherlands) Shana van der Vlist		Yamaha
193	(Netherlands) Kimberley Braam		Kawasaki
225	(France) Nelly Debuck		Honda
226	(Sweden) Frida Östlund		Honda
274	(Belgium) Amandine Verstappen	Motocross Marketing KTM	KTM
290	(France) Mathilde Denis		Yamaha
386	(Netherlands) Lianne Muilwijk		Honda
423	(Germany) Larissa Papenmeier		Suzuki
459	(Norway) Thea Johansen		Yamaha
555	(Sweden) Emelie Dahl		Yamaha
703	(Denmark) Julie Dalgaard		Honda
734	(Portugal) Joana Gonçalves		Yamaha
751	(Belgium) Jessica van de Velde		KTM
991	(Russia) Liubov Leonteva		Yamaha

== MXGP ==
=== MXGP Practice Times ===
Free Practice

Position	No.	Rider	Constructor	Time	Time Gap
1	89	(Belgium) Jeremy van Horebeek	Yamaha	1:52.255	
2	777	(Russia) Evgeny Bobryshev	Honda	1:52.382	+0.127
3	22	(Belgium) Kevin Strijbos	Suzuki	1:52.833	+0.578
4	243	(Slovenia) Tim Gajser	Honda	1:53.581	+1.326
5	100	(United Kingdom) Tommy Searle	Kawasaki	1:53.799	+1.544
6	222	(Italy) Tony Cairoli	KTM	1:54.183	+1.928
7	461	(France) Romain Febvre	Yamaha	1:54.315	+2.060
8	24	(United Kingdom) Shaun Simpson	KTM	1:54.616	+2.361
9	11	(Sweden) Filip Bengtsson	Suzuki	1:54.775	+2.520
10	259	(Netherlands) Glenn Coldenhoff	KTM	1:54.783	+2.528
11	7	(Estonia) Tanel Leok	KTM	1:54.792	+2.537
12	212	(Belgium) Jeffrey Dewulf	KTM	1:54.889	+2.634
13	92	(Switzerland) Valentin Guillod	Yamaha	1:54.914	+2.659
14	23	(France) Christophe Charlier	Husqvarna	1:55.280	+3.025
15	25	(Belgium) Clement Desalle	Kawasaki	1:55.739	+3.484
16	12	(Germany) Max Nagl	Husqvarna	1:55.950	+3.695
17	37	(Estonia) Gert Krestinov	Honda	1:56.008	+3.753
18	151	(Finland) Harri Kullas	KTM	1:56.486	+4.231
19	44	(United Kingdom) Elliott Banks-Browne	Yamaha	1:56.521	+4.266
20	177	(Lithuania) Arminas Jasikonis	Kawasaki	1:56.569	+4.314
21	77	(Italy) Alessandro Lupino	Honda	1:56.797	+4.542
22	19	(Italy) David Philippaerts	Yamaha	1:56.894	+4.639
23	17	(Spain) Jose Butron	KTM	1:57.028	+4.773
24	685	(France) Steven Lenoir	Honda	1:57.603	+5.348
25	45	(United Kingdom) Jake Nicholls	Husqvarna	1:58.223	+5.968
26	156	(Germany) Angus Heidecke	KTM	1:58.257	+6.002
27	62	(Slovenia) Klemen Gercar	Honda	1:59.584	+7.329
28	430	(Finland) Valterri Malin	KTM	1:59.822	+7.567
29	211	(United Kingdom) James Hutchinson	KTM	1:59.980	+7.725
30	32	(France) Milko Potisek	Yamaha	2:00.555	+8.300
31	920	(Spain) Ander Valentin	Kawasaki	2:00.646	+8.391
32	600	(Latvia) Davis Ivanovs	Yamaha	2:00.744	+8.489
33	400	(Japan) Kei Yamamoto	Honda	2:02.336	+10.081
34	50	(Latvia) Toms Macuks	Kawasaki	2:03.323	+11.068
35	149	(Germany) Dennis Ullrich	KTM	2:06.312	+14.057
36	8	(New Zealand) Ben Townley	Suzuki	2:33.806	+41.551

MXGP Timed Practice

Position	No.	Rider	Constructor	Time	Time Gap
1	22	(Belgium) Kevin Strijbos	Suzuki	1:50.545	
2	243	(Slovenia) Tim Gajser	Honda	1:51.047	+0.502
3	100	(United Kingdom) Tommy Searle	Kawasaki	1:51.175	+0.630
4	89	(Belgium) Jeremy van Horebeek	Yamaha	1:51.654	+1.109
5	12	(Germany) Max Nagl	Husqvarna	1:51.676	+1.131
6	777	(Russia) Evgeny Bobryshev	Honda	1:51.798	+1.253
7	24	(United Kingdom) Shaun Simpson	KTM	1:51.979	+1.434
8	7	(Estonia) Tanel Leok	KTM	1:52.529	+1.984
9	461	(France) Romain Febvre	Yamaha	1:52.554	+2.009
10	11	(Sweden) Filip Bengtsson	Suzuki	1:52.856	+2.311
11	259	(Netherlands) Glenn Coldenhoff	KTM	1:53.101	+2.556
12	222	(Italy) Tony Cairoli	KTM	1:53.284	+2.739
13	92	(Switzerland) Valentin Guillod	Yamaha	1:53.636	+3.091
14	44	(United Kingdom) Elliott Banks-Browne	Yamaha	1:54.646	+4.101
15	25	(Belgium) Clement Desalle	Kawasaki	1:54.694	+4.149
16	77	(Italy) Alessandro Lupino	Honda	1:54.757	+4.212
17	17	(Spain) Jose Butron	KTM	1:55.022	+4.477
18	212	(Belgium) Jeffrey Dewulf	KTM	1:55.332	+4.787
19	37	(Estonia) Gert Krestinov	Honda	1:55.395	+4.850
20	45	(United Kingdom) Jake Nicholls	Husqvarna	1:55.462	+4.917
21	177	(Lithuania) Arminas Jasikonis	Kawasaki	1:55.508	+4.963
22	151	(Finland) Harri Kullas	KTM	1:55.546	+5.001
23	23	(France) Christophe Charlier	Husqvarna	1:55.554	+5.009
24	19	(Italy) David Philippaerts	Yamaha	1:55.657	+5.112
25	8	(New Zealand) Ben Townley	Suzuki	2:56.112	+5.567
26	32	(France) Milko Potisek	Yamaha	1:56.288	+5.743
27	685	(France) Steven Lenoir	Honda	1:56.668	+6.123
28	430	(Finland) Valterri Malin	KTM	1:57.174	+6.629
29	156	(Germany) Angus Heidecke	KTM	1:57.242	+6.697
30	920	(Spain) Ander Valentin	Kawasaki	1:57.742	+7.197
31	62	(Slovenia) Klemen Gercar	Honda	1:58.302	+7.757
32	50	(Latvia) Toms Macuks	Kawasaki	1:58.411	+7.866
33	211	(United Kingdom) James Hutchinson	KTM	1:59.375	+8.830
34	149	(Germany) Dennis Ullrich	KTM	1:59.489	+8.944
35	600	(Latvia) Davis Ivanovs	Yamaha	1:59.493	+8.948
36	400	(Japan) Kei Yamamoto	Honda	2:01.619	+11.074

|}

=== MXGP Qualifying Race ===
Position	No.	Driver	Constructor	Laps	Time Gap
1	12	(Germany) Max Nagl	Husqvarna	12	
2	24	(United Kingdom) Shaun Simpson	KTM	12	+7.932
3	461	(France) Romain Febvre	Yamaha	12	+9.667
4	243	(Slovenia) Tim Gajser	Honda	12	+11.580
5	222	(Italy) Tony Cairoli	KTM	12	+12.967
6	259	(Netherlands) Glenn Coldenhoff	KTM	12	+15.594
7	22	(Belgium) Kevin Strijbos	Suzuki	12	+20.399
8	777	(Russia) Evgeny Bobryshev	Honda	12	+23.972
9	25	(Belgium) Clement Desalle	Kawasaki	12	+37.081
10	89	(Belgium) Jeremy van Horebeek	Yamaha	12	+37.329
11	11	(Sweden) Filip Bengtsson	Suzuki	12	+44.244
12	92	(Switzerland) Valentin Guillod	Yamaha	12	+45.019
13	7	(Estonia) Tanel Leok	KTM	12	+46.527
14	45	(United Kingdom) Jake Nicholls	Husqvarna	12	+58.113
15	100	(United Kingdom) Tommy Searle	Kawasaki	12	+1:03.643
16	44	(United Kingdom) Elliott Banks-Browne	Yamaha	12	+1:04.892
17	77	(Italy) Alessandro Lupino	Honda	12	+1:18.423
18	23	(France) Christophe Charlier	Husqvarna	12	+1:22.044
19	17	(Spain) Jose Butron	KTM	12	+1:27.084
20	151	(Finland) Harri Kullas	KTM	12	+1:28.190
21	8	(New Zealand) Ben Townley	Suzuki	12	+1:29.405
22	32	(France) Milko Potisek	Yamaha	12	+1:29.759
23	37	(Estonia) Gert Krestinov	Honda	12	+1:29.935
24	685	(France) Steven Lenoir	Honda	12	+1:34.415
25	19	(Italy) David Philippaerts	Yamaha	12	+1:41.206
26	156	(Germany) Angus Heidecke	KTM	12	+1:42.544
27	430	(Finland) Valterri Malin	KTM	12	+1:44.196
28	50	(Latvia) Toms Macuks	Kawasaki	12	+1:54.134
29	177	(Lithuania) Arminas Jasikonis	Kawasaki	12	+2:04.386
30	149	(Germany) Dennis Ullrich	KTM	11	+1 Lap
31	211	(United Kingdom) James Hutchinson	KTM	11	+1 Lap
32	920	(Spain) Ander Valentin	Kawasaki	11	+1 Lap
33	600	(Latvia) Davis Ivanovs	Yamaha	11	+1 Lap
34	62	(Slovenia) Klemen Gercar	Husqvarna	11	+1 Lap
	212	(Belgium) Jeffrey Dewulf	KTM	8	Retired
	400	(Japan) Kei Yamamoto	Honda	7	Retired

=== MXGP Races ===
Race 1

Position	No.	Driver	Constructor	Laps	Time Gap	Points
1	243	(Slovenia) Tim Gajser	Honda	15		25
2	12	(Germany) Max Nagl	Husqvarna	15	+5.431	22
3	461	(France) Romain Febvre	Yamaha	15	+33.443	20
4	777	(Russia) Evgeny Bobryshev	Honda	15	+46.976	18
5	89	(Belgium) Jeremy van Horebeek	Yamaha	15	+51.297	16
6	22	(Belgium) Kevin Strijbos	Suzuki	15	+52.205	15
7	222	(Italy) Tony Cairoli	KTM	15	+52.378	14
8	100	(United Kingdom) Tommy Searle	Kawasaki	15	+1:00.386	13
9	25	(Belgium) Clement Desalle	Kawasaki	15	+1:10.664	12
10	24	(United Kingdom) Shaun Simpson	KTM	15	+1:14.769	11
11	7	(Estonia) Tanel Leok	KTM	15	+1:18.409	10
12	92	(Switzerland) Valentin Guillod	Yamaha	15	+1:20.067	9
13	259	(Netherlands) Glenn Coldenhoff	KTM	15	+1:26.354	8
14	8	(New Zealand) Ben Townley	Suzuki	15	+2:26.311	7
15	212	(Belgium) Jeffrey Dewulf	KTM	14	+1 Lap	6
16	77	(Italy) Alessandro Lupino	Honda	14	+1 Lap	5
17	151	(Finland) Harri Kullas	KTM	14	+1 Lap	4
18	45	(United Kingdom) Jake Nicholls	Husqvarna	14	+1 Lap	3
19	177	(Lithuania) Arminas Jasikonis	Kawasaki	14	+1 Lap	2
20	156	(Germany) Angus Heidecke	KTM	14	+1 Lap	1
21	37	(Estonia) Gert Krestinov	Honda	14	+1 Lap	
22	600	(Latvia) Davis Ivanovs	Yamaha	14	+1 Lap	
23	430	(Finland) Valterri Malin	KTM	14	+1 Lap	
24	920	(Spain) Ander Valentin	Kawasaki	14	+1 Lap	
25	23	(France) Christophe Charlier	Husqvarna	14	+1 Lap	
26	685	(France) Steven Lenoir	Honda	14	+1 Lap	
27	62	(Slovenia) Klemen Gercar	Honda	13	+2 Laps	
28	149	(Germany) Dennis Ullrich	KTM	13	+2 Laps	
29	400	(Japan) Kei Yamamoto	Honda	13	+2 Laps	
	17	(Spain) Jose Butron	KTM	11	Retired	
	44	(United Kingdom) Elliott Banks-Browne	Yamaha	8	Retired	
	50	(Latvia) Toms Macuks	Kawasaki	6	Retired	
	19	(Italy) David Philippaerts	Yamaha	6	Retired	
	211	(United Kingdom) James Hutchinson	KTM	6	Retired	
	32	(France) Milko Potisek	Yamaha	3	Retired	
	11	(Sweden) Filip Bengtsson	Suzuki	0	Retired	

Race 2

Position	No.	Driver	Constructor	Laps	Time Gap	Points
1	461	(France) Romain Febvre	Yamaha	16		25
2	222	(Italy) Tony Cairoli	KTM	16	+5.156	22
3	89	(Belgium) Jeremy van Horebeek	Yamaha	16	+12.437	20
4	12	(Germany) Max Nagl	Husqvarna	16	+14.500	18
5	22	(Belgium) Kevin Strijbos	Suzuki	16	+17.253	16
6	777	(Russia) Evgeny Bobryshev	Honda	16	+25.165	15
7	259	(Netherlands) Glenn Coldenhoff	KTM	16	+27.558	14
8	243	(Slovenia) Tim Gajser	Honda	16	+39.187	13
9	24	(United Kingdom) Shaun Simpson	KTM	16	+53.250	12
10	23	(France) Christophe Charlier	Husqvarna	16	+1:10.348	11
11	151	(Finland) Harri Kullas	KTM	16	+1:12.131	10
12	7	(Estonia) Tanel Leok	KTM	16	+1:12.168	9
13	37	(Estonia) Gert Krestinov	Honda	16	+1:49.835	8
14	19	(Italy) David Philippaerts	Yamaha	16	+1:54.950	7
15	685	(France) Steven Lenoir	Honda	16	+1:57.152	6
16	92	(Switzerland) Valentin Guillod	Yamaha	16	+2:05.134	5
17	17	(Spain) Jose Butron	KTM	16	+2:20.130	4
18	100	(United Kingdom) Tommy Searle	Kawasaki	15	+1 Lap	3
19	25	(Belgium) Clement Desalle	Kawasaki	15	+1 Lap	2
20	32	(France) Milko Potisek	Yamaha	15	+1 Lap	1
21	177	(Lithuania) Arminas Jasikonis^{1}	Kawasaki	16	+1:57.548	
22	430	(Finland) Valterri Malin	KTM	15	+1 lap	
23	156	(Germany) Angus Heidecke	KTM	15	+1 Lap	
24	211	(United Kingdom) James Hutchinson	KTM	15	+1 Lap	
25	920	(Spain) Ander Valentin	Kawasaki	15	+1 Lap	
26	212	(Belgium) Jeffrey Dewulf	KTM	15	+1 Lap	
27	149	(Germany) Dennis Ullrich	KTM	15	+1 Lap	
28	400	(Japan) Kei Yamamoto	Honda	15	+1 lap	
	62	(Slovenia) Klemen Gercar	Honda	10	Retired	
	600	(Latvia) Davis Ivanovs	Yamaha	5	Retired	
	8	(New Zealand) Ben Townley	Suzuki	5	Retired	
	77	(Italy) Alessandro Lupino	Honda	2	Retired	
	45	(United Kingdom) Jake Nicholls	Husqvarna	2	Retired	
	50	(Latvia) Toms Macuks	Kawasaki	1	Retired	
	11	(Sweden) Filip Bengtsson	Suzuki	0	Retired	
	44	(United Kingdom) Elliott Banks-Browne	Yamaha	0	Retired	

^{1}Jasikonis finished in 16th place but was then given a time penalty.

=== MXGP of Europe Overall ===
Position	No.	Driver	Constructor	Race 1	Race 2	Points
1	461	(France) Romain Febvre	Yamaha	20	25	45
2	12	(Germany) Max Nagl	Husqvarna	22	18	40
3	243	(Slovenia) Tim Gajser	Honda	25	13	38
4	222	(Italy) Tony Cairoli	KTM	14	22	36
5	89	(Belgium) Jeremy van Horebeek	Yamaha	16	20	36
6	777	(Russia) Evgeny Bobryshev	Honda	18	15	33
7	22	(Belgium) Kevin Strijbos	Suzuki	15	16	31
8	24	(United Kingdom) Shaun Simpson	KTM	11	12	23
9	259	(Netherlands) Glenn Coldenhoff	KTM	8	14	22
10	7	(Estonia) Tanel Leok	KTM	10	9	19
11	100	(United Kingdom) Tommy Searle	Kawasaki	13	3	16
12	151	(Finland) Harri Kullas	KTM	4	10	14
13	92	(Switzerland) Valentin Guillod	Yamaha	9	5	14
14	25	(Belgium) Clement Desalle	Kawasaki	12	2	14
15	23	(France) Christophe Charlier	Husqvarna	0	11	11
16	37	(Estonia) Gert Krestinov	Honda	0	8	8
17	19	(Italy) David Philippaerts	Yamaha	0	7	7
18	8	(New Zealand) Ben Townley	Suzuki	7	0	7
19	685	(France) Steven Lenoir	Honda	0	6	6
20	212	(Belgium) Jeffrey Dewulf	KTM	6	0	6
21	77	(Italy) Alessandro Lupino	Honda	5	0	5
22	17	(Spain) Jose Butron	KTM	0	4	4
23	45	(United Kingdom) Jake Nicholls	Husqvarna	3	0	3
24	177	(Lithuania) Arminas Jasikonis	Kawasaki	2	0	2
25	32	(France) Milko Potisek	Yamaha	0	1	1
26	156	(Germany) Angus Heidecke	KTM	1	0	1
	430	(Finland) Valterri Malin	KTM	0	0	
	211	(United Kingdom) James Hutchinson	KTM	0	0	
	920	(Spain) Ander Valentin	Kawasaki	0	0	
	149	(Germany) Dennis Ullrich	KTM	0	0	
	400	(Japan) Kei Yamamoto	Honda	0	0	
	62	(Slovenia) Klemen Gercar	Honda	0	0	
	600	(Latvia) Davis Ivanovs	Yamaha	0	0	
	50	(Latvia) Toms Macuks	Kawasaki	0	0	
	11	(Sweden) Filip Bengtsson	Suzuki	0	0	
	44	(United Kingdom) Elliott Banks-Browne	Yamaha	0	0	

== MX2 ==
=== MX2 Practice Times ===
Free Practice

Position	No.	Driver	Constructor	Time	Time Gap
1	84	(Netherlands) Jeffrey Herlings	KTM	1:53.004	
2	172	(Belgium) Brent van Donninck	Yamaha	1:54.996	+1.992
3	59	(Russia) Aleksandr Tonkov	Yamaha	1:55.443	+2.439
4	41	(Latvia) Pauls Jonass	KTM	1:55.447	+2.443
5	99	(United Kingdom) Max Anstie	Husqvarna	1:55.499	+2.495
6	10	(Netherlands) Calvin Vlaanderen	KTM	1:55.607	+2.603
7	161	(Sweden) Alvin Östlund	Yamaha	1:55.725	+2.721
8	6	(France) Benoit Paturel	Yamaha	1:55.855	+2.851
9	152	(Bulgaria) Petar Petrov	Kawasaki	1:56.058	+3.054
10	88	(Netherlands) Freek van der Vlist	Kawasaki	1:56.062	+3.058
11	189	(Netherlands) Brian Bogers	KTM	1:56.165	+3.161
12	18	(Russia) Vsevolod Brylyakov	Kawasaki	1:56.448	+3.444
13	91	(Switzerland) Jeremy Seewer	Suzuki	1:56.523	+3.519
14	46	(Netherlands) Davy Pootjes	KTM	1:56.929	+3.925
15	101	(Spain) Jorge Zaragoza	Honda	1:57.290	+4.286
16	919	(United Kingdom) Ben Watson	Husqvarna	1:57.378	+4.374
17	64	(United States) Thomas Covington	Husqvarna	1:57.777	+4.773
18	95	(Latvia) Roberts Justs	KTM	1:57.940	+4.936
19	71	(Belgium) Damon Graulus	Honda	1:58.298	+5.294
20	338	(France) David Herbreteau	Honda	1:58.354	+5.350
21	132	(Estonia) Karel Kutsar	KTM	1:58.444	+5.440
22	747	(Italy) Michele Cervellin	Honda	1:58.486	+5.482
23	40	(Italy) Simone Zecchina	Yamaha	1:59.562	+6.558
24	66	(Spain) Iker Larranaga	KTM	1:59.662	+6.658
25	107	(Netherlands) Lars van Berkel	Husqvarna	1:59.798	+6.794
26	29	(Germany) Henry Jacobi	Honda	2:00.126	+7.122
27	15	(Italy) Davide Bonini	Husqvarna	2:00.152	+7.148
28	223	(Italy) Giuseppe Tropepe	Husqvarna	2:00.485	+7.481
29	75	(Estonia) Hardi Roosiorg	KTM	2:00.713	+7.709
30	251	(Belgium) Jens Getteman	KTM	2:01.010	+8.006
31	321	(Italy) Samuele Bernardini	TM	2:01.531	+8.527
32	110	(France) Alexis Verhaeghe	Kawasaki	2:01.565	+8.561
33	831	(Poland) Tomasz Wysocki	KTM	2:01.597	+8.593
34	79	(Netherlands) Jaap Corneth	Yamaha	2:01.840	+8.836
35	474	(Belgium) Bryan Boulard	Kawasaki	2:02.785	+9.781
36	490	(Spain) Francesc Mataro	Yamaha	2:03.196	+10.192
37	97	(Bulgaria) Michael Ivanov	KTM	2:04.544	+11.540
38	142	(Bulgaria) Ivan Petrov	KTM	2:04.939	+11.935
39	14	(Switzerland) Christopher Valente	KTM	2:05.143	+12.139
40	43	(Italy) Davide de Bortoli	Husqvarna	2:10.949	+17.954

MX2 Timed Practice

Position	No.	Driver	Constructor	Time	Time Gap
1	84	(Netherlands) Jeffrey Herlings	KTM	1:51.201	
2	41	(Latvia) Pauls Jonass	KTM	1:53.302	+2.101
3	10	(Netherlands) Calvin Vlaanderen	KTM	1:53.353	+2.152
4	59	(Russia) Aleksandr Tonkov	Yamaha	1:53.429	+2.228
5	91	(Switzerland) Jeremy Seewer	Suzuki	1:53.529	+2.328
6	172	(Belgium) Brent van Donninck	Yamaha	1:53.644	+2.443
7	99	(United Kingdom) Max Anstie	Husqvarna	1:53.926	+2.725
8	189	(Netherlands) Brian Bogers	KTM	1:54.184	+2.983
9	152	(Bulgaria) Petar Petrov	Kawasaki	1:54.656	+3.455
10	161	(Sweden) Alvin Östlund	Yamaha	1:54.905	+3.704
11	18	(Russia) Vsevolod Brylyakov	Kawasaki	1:55.010	+3.809
12	95	(Latvia) Roberts Justs	KTM	1:55.246	+4.045
13	46	(Netherlands) Davy Pootjes	KTM	1:55.257	+4.056
14	747	(Italy) Michele Cervellin	Honda	1:55.524	+4.323
15	88	(Netherlands) Freek van der Vlist	Kawasaki	1:55.665	+4.464
16	71	(Belgium) Damon Graulus	Honda	1:55.798	+4.597
17	101	(Spain) Jorge Zaragoza	Honda	1:55.834	+4.633
18	6	(France) Benoit Paturel	Yamaha	1:55.899	+4.698
19	251	(Belgium) Jens Getteman	KTM	1:55.968	+4.767
20	321	(Italy) Samuele Bernardini	TM	1:55.995	+4.794
21	919	(United Kingdom) Ben Watson	Husqvarna	1:56.218	+5.017
22	15	(Italy) Davide Bonini	Husqvarna	1:56.338	+5.137
23	64	(United States) Thomas Covington	Husqvarna	1:56.490	+5.289
24	338	(France) David Herbreteau	Honda	1:56.747	+5.546
25	223	(Italy) Giuseppe Tropepe	Husqvarna	1:56.822	+5.621
26	132	(Estonia) Karel Kutsar	KTM	1:57.417	+6.216
27	110	(France) Alexis Verhaeghe	Kawasaki	1:57.484	+6.283
28	831	(Poland) Tomasz Wysocki	KTM	1:57.840	+6.639
29	107	(Netherlands) Lars van Berkel	Husqvarna	1:57.871	+6.670
30	75	(Estonia) Hardi Roosiorg	KTM	1:57.880	+6.679
31	29	(Germany) Henry Jacobi	Honda	1:57.912	+6.711
32	40	(Italy) Simone Zecchina	Yamaha	1:58.783	+7.582
33	79	(Netherlands) Jaap Corneth	Yamaha	1:58.982	+7.781
34	66	(Spain) Iker Larranaga	KTM	1:59.137	+7.936
35	43	(Italy) Davide de Bortoli	Husqvarna	2:00.067	+8.866
36	97	(Bulgaria) Michael Ivanov	KTM	2:00.724	+9.523
37	142	(Bulgaria) Ivan Petrov	KTM	2:02.248	+11.047
38	490	(Spain) Francesc Mataro	Yamaha	2:02.970	+11.769
39	14	(Switzerland) Christopher Valente	KTM	2:03.095	+11.894
40	474	(Belgium) Bryan Boulard	Kawasaki	2:04.330	+13.129

=== MX2 Qualifying Race ===
Position	No.	Driver	Constructor	Laps	Time Gap
1	84	(Netherlands) Jeffrey Herlings	KTM	12	
2	59	(Russia) Aleksandr Tonkov	Yamaha	12	+36.003
3	41	(Latvia) Pauls Jonass	KTM	12	+37.167
4	10	(Netherlands) Calvin Vlaanderen	KTM	12	+50.171
5	152	(Bulgaria) Petar Petrov	Kawasaki	12	+56.259
6	6	(France) Benoit Paturel	Yamaha	12	+58.111
7	95	(Latvia) Roberts Justs	KTM	12	+1:14.439
8	161	(Sweden) Alvin Östlund	Yamaha	12	+1:16.347
9	101	(Spain) Jorge Zaragoza	Honda	12	+1:28.825
10	88	(Netherlands) Freek van der Vlist	Kawasaki	12	+1:30.866
11	18	(Russia) Vsevolod Brylyakov	Kawasaki	12	+1:31.445
12	223	(Italy) Giuseppe Tropepe	Husqvarna	12	+1:32.511
13	91	(Switzerland) Jeremy Seewer	Suzuki	12	+1:36.975
14	747	(Italy) Michele Cervellin	Honda	12	+1:44.209
15	919	(United Kingdom) Ben Watson	Husqvarna	12	+1:48.231
16	132	(Estonia) Karel Kutsar	KTM	12	+1:57.861
17	321	(Italy) Samuele Bernardini	TM	12	+2:06.251
18	66	(Spain) Iker Larranaga	KTM	11	+1 Lap
19	46	(Netherlands) Davy Pootjes	KTM	11	+1 Lap
20	64	(United States) Thomas Covington	Husqvarna	11	+1 lap
21	40	(Italy) Simone Zecchina	Yamaha	11	+1 Lap
22	107	(Netherlands) Lars van Berkel	Husqvarna	11	+1 Lap
23	15	(Italy) Davide Bonini	Husqvarna	11	+1 Lap
24	251	(Belgium) Jens Getteman	KTM	11	+1 Lap
25	71	(Belgium) Damon Graulus	Honda	11	+1 Lap
26	338	(France) David Herbreteau	Honda	11	+1 Lap
27	110	(France) Alexis Verhaeghe	Kawasaki	11	+1 Lap
28	75	(Estonia) Hardi Roosiorg	KTM	11	+1 Lap
29	831	(Poland) Tomasz Wysocki	KTM	11	+1 Lap
30	474	(Belgium) Bryan Boulard	Kawasaki	11	+1 Lap
31	79	(Netherlands) Jaap Corneth	Yamaha	11	+1 Lap
32	142	(Bulgaria) Ivan Petrov	KTM	11	+1 Lap
	99	(United Kingdom) Max Anstie	Husqvarna	10	Retired
	29	(Germany) Henry Jacobi	Honda	9	Retired
	172	(Belgium) Brent van Donninck	Yamaha	8	Retired
	43	(Italy) Davide de Bortoli	Husqvarna	8	Retired
	14	(Switzerland) Christopher Valente	KTM	7	Retired
	97	(Bulgaria) Michael Ivanov	KTM	5	Retired
	490	(Spain) Francesc Mataro	Yamaha	0	Retired
	189	(Netherlands) Brian Bogers^{1}	KTM	0	Retired

^{1}Brian Bogers broke his collarbone in an accident on the start straight, he will take no further part in the grand prix.
