= 2016 MXGP of Thailand =

The 2016 MXGP of Thailand was the second round of the 2016 FIM Motocross World Championship season. It was held at the Suphan Buri track in Suphan Buri Province on 5–6 March 2016 and included the second rounds of the 2016 MXGP and MX2 world championships. The Suphan Buri Motorsport Land facility made its debut as a host of an MXGP event.

== Entry lists ==
The entry lists for the 2016 MXGP of Thailand were announced on 23 February 2016.

=== Entry list ===
MXGP entry list

No.	Rider	Team	Manufacturer
7	(Estonia) Tanel Leok		KTM
8	(New Zealand) Ben Townley	Team Suzuki World MXGP	Suzuki
12	(Germany) Max Nagl	Rockstar Energy Husqvarna	Husqvarna
17	(Spain) Jose Butron	Marchetti Racing KTM	KTM
21	(France) Gautier Paulin	Team HRC	Honda
22	(Belgium) Kevin Strijbos	Team Suzuki World MXGP	Suzuki
23	(France) Christophe Charlier	Rockstar Energy Husqvarna	Husqvarna
24	(United Kingdom) Shaun Simpson	Wilvo Virus Performance KTM	KTM
25	(Belgium) Clement Desalle	Monster Energy Kawasaki	Kawasaki
31	(United Kingdom) Alex Snow	JK Racing Yamaha	Yamaha
32	(France) Milko Potisek	Tip Top MP32 Racing	Yamaha
77	(Italy) Alessandro Lupino	Team Assomotor Honda	Honda
89	(Belgium) Jeremy van Horebeek	Monster Energy Yamaha	Yamaha
92	(Switzerland) Valentin Guillod	Kemea Yamaha Yamalube	Yamaha
100	(United Kingdom) Tommy Searle	Monster Energy DRT Kawasaki	Kawasaki
131	(Thailand) Chaiyan Romphan		Yamaha
171	(Thailand) Thanarat Penjan		Kawasaki
222	(Italy) Tony Cairoli	Red Bull KTM	KTM
243	(Slovenia) Tim Gajser	Honda Gariboldi	Honda
259	(Netherlands) Glenn Coldenhoff	Red Bull KTM	KTM
400	(Japan) Kei Yamamoto	Team Assomotor Honda	Honda
461	(France) Romain Febvre	Monster Energy Yamaha	Yamaha
777	(Russia) Evgeny Bobryshev	Team HRC	Honda

MX2 entry list

No.	Rider	Team	Manufacturer
4	(France) Dylan Ferrandis	Monster Energy Kawasaki	Kawasaki
6	(France) Benoit Paturel	Kemea Yamaha Yamalube	Yamaha
18	(Russia) Vsevolod Brylyakov	Monster Energy DRT Kawasaki	Kawasaki
28	(Thailand) Ben Hallgren		Yamaha
29	(Germany) Henry Jacobi	JTech Honda	Honda
41	(Latvia) Pauls Jonass	Red Bull KTM	KTM
46	(Netherlands) Davy Pootjes^{1}	Red Bull KTM	KTM
52	(Japan) Shota Ueda		Kawasaki
59	(Russia) Aleksandr Tonkov	Wilvo Standing Construct Yamaha	Yamaha
64	(United States) Thomas Covington	Rockstar Energy Husqvarna	Husqvarna
71	(Belgium) Damon Graulus	JTech Honda	Honda
76	(Thailand) Jaturong Jomjaturong		Suzuki
84	(Netherlands) Jeffrey Herlings	Red Bull KTM	KTM
88	(Netherlands) Frederik van der Vlist	Team HNR GPR PROMO	Kawasaki
91	(Switzerland) Jeremy Seewer	Team Suzuki World MX2	Suzuki
93	(Thailand) Phanuphong Somsawat		Kawasaki
95	(Latvia) Roberts Justs	HSF Logistics Motorsport Team	KTM
97	(Bulgaria) Michael Ivanov	Marchetti Racing Team	KTM
99	(United Kingdom) Max Anstie	Rockstar Energy Husqvarna	Husqvarna
101	(Spain) Jorge Zaragoza	Honda Gariboldi	Honda
152	(Bulgaria) Petar Petrov	Monster Energy Kawasaki	Kawasaki
161	(Sweden) Alvin Östlund	Wilvo Standing Construct Yamaha	Yamaha
172	(Belgium) Brent van Doninck	Kemea Yamaha Yamalube	Yamaha
174	(United Kingdom) Alfie Smith^{2}	JK Racing Yamaha	Yamaha
189	(Netherlands) Brian Bogers	HSF Logistics Motorsport	KTM
251	(Belgium) Jens Getteman	Motocross Marketing KTM	KTM
321	(Italy) Samuele Bernardini	TM Factory Racing Team	TM
500	(Japan) Nozomu Yasuhara		Yamaha
811	(United Kingdom) Adam Sterry^{3}	Wilvo Virus Performance KTM	KTM
888	(China) Jian Hao Xu		Kawasaki
919	(United Kingdom) Ben Watson	Hitachi Construction KTM	KTM

^{1} Davy Pootjes did not ride due to a broken collarbone sustained at the MXGP of Qatar.

^{2} Alfie Smith did not ride after separating the ACL in his shoulder at the MXGP of Qatar.

^{3} Adam Sterry did not ride due to a broken wrist sustained at the MXGP of Qatar.

== MXGP ==
=== MXGP Practice Times ===
Free Practice

Position	No.	Driver	Constructor	Time	Time Gap
1	89	(Belgium) Jeremy van Horebeek	Yamaha	1:41.868	
2	461	(France) Romain Febvre	Yamaha	1:41.926	+0.058
3	24	(United Kingdom) Shaun Simpson	KTM	1:42.365	+0.497
4	77	(Italy) Alessandro Lupino	Honda	1:42.415	+0.547
5	22	(Belgium) Kevin Strijbos	Suzuki	1:43.111	+1.243
6	243	(Slovenia) Tim Gajser	Honda	1:43.497	+1.629
7	259	(Netherlands) Glenn Coldenhoff	KTM	1:43.571	+1.703
8	92	(Switzerland) Valentin Guillod	Yamaha	1:43.691	+1.823
9	8	(New Zealand) Ben Townley	Suzuki	1:43.723	+1.855
10	17	(Spain) Jose Butron	KTM	1:44.103	+2.235
11	222	(Italy) Tony Cairoli	KTM	1:44.147	+2.279
12	21	(France) Gautier Paulin	Honda	1:44.881	+3.013
13	777	(Russia) Evgeny Bobryshev	Honda	1:45.625	+3.756
14	32	(France) Milko Potisek	Yamaha	1:45.862	+3.994
15	25	(Belgium) Clement Desalle^{1}	Kawasaki	1:45.923	+4.055
16	7	(Estonia) Tanel Leok	KTM	1:46.036	+4.168
17	12	(Germany) Max Nagl	Husqvarna	1:46.113	+4.245
18	31	(United Kingdom) Alex Snow	Yamaha	1:46.495	+4.627
19	100	(United Kingdom) Tommy Searle	Kawasaki	1:46.757	+4.889
20	23	(France) Christophe Charlier	Husqvarna	1:48.306	+6.438
21	400	(Japan) Kei Yamamoto	Honda	1:48.848	+6.980
22	131	(Thailand) Chaiyan Romphan	Yamaha	1:58.504	+16.636
23	171	(Thailand) Thanarat Penjan	Kawasaki	2:16.374	+34.506

^{1} Clement Desalle is riding the grand prix with a broken arm that he sustained at a pre-season race.

MXGP Timed Practice

Position	No.	Driver	Constructor	Time	Time Gap
1	461	(France) Romain Febvre	Yamaha	1:39.047	
2	243	(Slovenia) Tim Gajser	Honda	1:39.169	+0.122
3	22	(Belgium) Kevin Strijbos	Suzuki	1:40.211	+1.164
4	8	(New Zealand) Ben Townley	Suzuki	1:40.412	+1.365
5	89	(Belgium) Jeremy van Horebeek	Yamaha	1:40.768	+1.721
6	77	(Italy) Alessandro Lupino	Honda	1:40.778	+1.731
7	100	(United Kingdom) Tommy Searle	Kawasaki	1:41.030	+1.983
8	777	(Russia) Evgeny Bobryshev	Honda	1:41.239	+2.192
9	12	(Germany) Max Nagl	Husqvarna	1:41.276	+2.229
10	24	(United Kingdom) Shaun Simpson	KTM	1:41.311	+2.264
11	222	(Italy) Tony Cairoli	KTM	1:41.676	+2.629
12	92	(Switzerland) Valentin Guillod	Yamaha	1:41.719	+2.672
13	7	(Estonia) Tanel Leok	KTM	1:41.859	+2.812
14	259	(Netherlands) Glenn Coldenhoff	KTM	1:41.979	+2.932
15	21	(France) Gautier Paulin	Honda	1:42.093	+3.046
16	32	(France) Milko Potisek	Yamaha	1:42.201	+3.154
17	23	(France) Christophe Charlier	Husqvarna	1:42.957	+3.910
18	17	(Spain) Jose Butron	KTM	1:43.122	+4.075
19	400	(Japan) Kei Yamamoto	Honda	1:43.782	+4.735
20	31	(United Kingdom) Alex Snow	Yamaha	1:45.533	+6.506
21	131	(Thailand) Chaiyan Romphan	Yamaha	1:50.942	+11.895
22	25	(Belgium) Clement Desalle	Kawasaki	1:54.561	+15.514
23	171	(Thailand) Thanarat Penjan	Kawasaki	2:02.966	+23.919

=== MXGP Qualifying Race ===
Position	No.	Driver	Constructor	Laps	Time Gap
1	8	(New Zealand) Ben Townley	Suzuki	13	
2	461	(France) Romain Febvre	Yamaha	13	+3.512
3	222	(Italy) Tony Cairoli	KTM	13	+5.459
4	89	(Belgium) Jeremy van Horebeek	Yamaha	13	+13.490
5	243	(Slovenia) Tim Gajser	Honda	13	+20.501
6	22	(Belgium) Kevin Strijbos	Suzuki	13	+25.259
7	12	(Germany) Max Nagl	Husqvarna	13	+29.967
8	21	(France) Gautier Paulin	Honda	13	+35.794
9	24	(United Kingdom) Shaun Simpson	KTM	13	+37.280
10	259	(Netherlands) Glenn Coldenhoff	KTM	13	+38.030
11	777	(Russia) Evgeny Bobryshev	Honda	13	+45.703
12	100	(United Kingdom) Tommy Searle	Kawasaki	13	+50.283
13	92	(Switzerland) Valentin Guillod	Yamaha	13	+52.650
14	77	(Italy) Alessandro Lupino	Honda	13	+1:09.673
15	400	(Japan) Kei Yamamoto	Honda	13	+1:21.723
16	23	(France) Christophe Charlier	Husqvarna	13	+1:35.505
17	31	(United Kingdom) Alex Snow	Yamaha	12	+1 Lap
18	131	(Thailand) Chaiyan Romphan	Yamaha	12	+1 Lap
19	171	(Thailand) Thanarat Penjan	Kawasaki	10	+3 Laps
	32	(France) Milko Potisek	Yamaha	6	Retired
	17	(Spain) Jose Butron	KTM	5	Retired
	7	(Estonia) Tanel Leok	KTM	3	Retired
	25	(Belgium) Clement Desalle	Kawasaki	1	Retired

=== MXGP Races ===
Race 1

Position	No.	Driver	Constructor	Laps	Time Gap	Points
1	461	(France) Romain Febvre	Yamaha	19		25
2	222	(Italy) Tony Cairoli	KTM	19	+2.775	22
3	243	(Slovenia) Tim Gajser	Honda	19	+5.871	20
4	777	(Russia) Evgeny Bobryshev	Honda	19	+18.040	18
5	89	(Belgium) Jeremy van Horebeek	Yamaha	19	+21.958	16
6	100	(United Kingdom) Tommy Searle	Kawasaki	19	+33.173	15
7	21	(France) Gautier Paulin	Honda	19	+36.125	14
8	22	(Belgium) Kevin Strijbos	Suzuki	19	+47.200	13
9	24	(United Kingdom) Shaun Simpson	KTM	19	+51.008	12
10	23	(France) Christophe Charlier	Husqvarna	19	+59.191	11
11	92	(Switzerland) Valentin Guillod	Yamaha	19	+1:02.840	10
12	32	(France) Milko Potisek	Yamaha	19	+1:05.143	9
13	17	(Spain) Jose Butron	KTM	19	+1:13.586	8
14	77	(Italy) Alessandro Lupino	Honda	19	+1:16.599	7
15	259	(Netherlands) Glenn Coldenhoff	KTM	19	+1:24.528	6
16	25	(Belgium) Clement Desalle	Kawasaki	19	+1:30.705	5
17	7	(Estonia) Tanel Leok	KTM	18	+1 Lap	4
18	400	(Japan) Kei Yamamoto	Honda	18	+1 Lap	3
19	31	(United Kingdom) Alex Snow	Yamaha	18	+1 Lap	2
20	171	(Thailand) Thanarat Penjan	Honda	16	+3 Laps	1
	12	(Germany) Max Nagl	Husqvarna	14	Retired	
	131	(Thailand) Chaiyan Romphan	Yamaha	14	Retired	
	8	(New Zealand) Ben Townley	Suzuki	8	Retired	

Race 2

Position	No.	Driver	Constructor	Laps	Time Gap	Points
1	461	(France) Romain Febvre	Yamaha	19		25
2	8	(New Zealand) Ben Townley	Suzuki	19	+6.038	22
3	12	(Germany) Max Nagl	Husqvarna	19	+7.876	20
4	89	(Belgium) Jeremy van Horebeek	Yamaha	19	+10.723	18
5	243	(Slovenia) Tim Gajser	Honda	19	+20.508	16
6	24	(United Kingdom) Shaun Simpson	KTM	19	+23.325	15
7	777	(Russia) Evgeny Bobryshev	Honda	19	+32.355	14
8	17	(Spain) Jose Butron	KTM	19	+36.229	13
9	21	(France) Gautier Paulin	Honda	19	+38.176	12
10	92	(Switzerland) Valentin Guillod	Yamaha	19	+41.132	11
11	22	(Belgium) Kevin Strijbos	Suzuki	19	+43.047	10
12	222	(Italy) Tony Cairoli	KTM	19	+47.932	9
13	77	(Italy) Alessandro Lupino	Honda	19	+50.244	8
14	100	(United Kingdom) Tommy Searle	Kawasaki	19	+56.903	7
15	32	(France) Milko Potisek	Yamaha	19	+1:04.770	6
16	23	(France) Christophe Charlier	Husqvarna	19	+1:12.194	5
17	7	(Estonia) Tanel Leok	KTM	19	+1:42.623	4
18	400	(Japan) Kei Yamamoto	Honda	19	+2:03.034	3
19	259	(Netherlands) Glenn Coldenhoff	KTM	18	+1 Lap	2
20	25	(Belgium) Clement Desalle	Kawasaki	18	+1 Lap	1
21	31	(United Kingdom) Alex Snow	Yamaha	18	+1 Lap	
22	131	(Thailand) Chaiyan Romphan	Yamaha	17	+2 Laps	
23	171	(Thailand) Thanarat Penjan	Honda	14	+5 Laps	

=== MXGP of Thailand Overall ===
Position	No.	Driver	Constructor	Race 1	Race 2	Points
1	461	(France) Romain Febvre	Yamaha	25	25	50
2	243	(Slovenia) Tim Gajser	Honda	20	16	36
3	89	(Belgium) Jeremy van Horebeek	Yamaha	16	18	34
4	777	(Russia) Evgeny Bobryshev	Honda	18	14	32
5	222	(Italy) Tony Cairoli	KTM	22	9	31
6	24	(United Kingdom) Shaun Simpson	KTM	12	15	37
7	21	(France) Gautier Paulin	Honda	14	12	26
8	22	(Belgium) Kevin Strijbos	Suzuki	13	10	23
9	8	(New Zealand) Ben Townley	Suzuki	0	22	22
10	100	(United Kingdom) Tommy Searle	Kawasaki	15	7	22
11	17	(Spain) Jose Butron	KTM	8	13	21
12	92	(Switzerland) Valentin Guillod	Yamaha	10	11	21
13	12	(Germany) Max Nagl	Husqvarna	0	20	20
14	23	(France) Christophe Charlier	Husqvarna	11	5	16
15	77	(Italy) Alessandro Lupino	Honda	7	8	15
16	32	(France) Milko Potisek	Yamaha	9	6	15
17	7	(Estonia) Tanel Leok	KTM	4	4	8
18	259	(Netherlands) Glenn Coldenhoff	KTM	6	2	8
19	400	(Japan) Kei Yamamoto	Honda	3	3	6
20	25	(Belgium) Clement Desalle	Kawasaki	5	1	6
21	31	(United Kingdom) Alex Snow	Yamaha	2	0	2
22	171	(Thailand) Thanarat Penjan	Honda	1	0	1
	131	(Thailand) Chaiyan Romphan	Yamaha	0	0	

== MX2 ==
=== MX2 Practice Times ===
Free Practice

Position	No.	Driver	Constructor	Time	Time Gap
1	84	(Netherlands) Jeffrey Herlings	KTM	1:44.821	
2	4	(France) Dylan Ferrandis	Kawasaki	1:45.085	+0.264
3	41	(Latvia) Pauls Jonass	KTM	1:46.237	+1.416
4	91	(Switzerland) Jeremy Seewer	Suzuki	1:47.118	+2.297
5	59	(Russia) Aleksandr Tonkov	Yamaha	1:47.327	+2.506
6	172	(Belgium) Brent van Donninck	Yamaha	1:47.382	+2.561
7	152	(Bulgaria) Petar Petrov	Kawasaki	1:47.911	+3.090
8	64	(United States) Thomas Covington	Husqvarna	1:47.977	+3.156
9	6	(France) Benoit Paturel	Yamaha	1:48.025	+3.204
10	189	(Netherlands) Brian Bogers	KTM	1:48.137	+3.316
11	95	(Latvia) Roberts Justs	KTM	1:48.736	+3.915
12	99	(United Kingdom) Max Anstie	Husqvarna	1:48.939	+4.118
13	71	(Belgium) Damon Graulus	Honda	1:49.027	+4.206
14	18	(Russia) Vsevolod Brylyakov	Kawasaki	1:49.484	+4.663
15	251	(Belgium) Jens Getteman	KTM	1:50.576	+5.755
16	97	(Bulgaria) Michael Ivanov	KTM	1:50.632	+5.811
17	101	(Spain) Jorge Zaragoza	Honda	1:50.744	+5.923
18	161	(Sweden) Alvin Östlund	Yamaha	1:51.033	+6.212
19	919	(United Kingdom) Ben Watson	Husqvarna	1:51.054	+6.233
20	132	(Estonia) Karel Kutsar	KTM	1:51.122	+6.301
21	321	(Italy) Samuele Bernardini	TM	1:51.249	+6.428
22	88	(Netherlands) Freek van der Vlist	Kawasaki	1:51.636	+6.815
23	29	(Germany) Henry Jacobi	Honda	1:53.616	+8.795
24	500	(Japan) Nozomu Yasuhara	Yamaha	1:58.866	+14.045
25	28	(Thailand) Ben Hallgren	Yamaha	2:01.881	+17.060
26	93	(Thailand) Phanuphong Somsawat	Kawasaki	2:02.296	+17.475
27	52	(Japan) Shota Ueda	Kawasaki	2:04.565	+19.744
28	76	(Thailand) Jaturong Jomjaturong	Suzuki	2:11.306	+26.485
29	888	(China) Jian Hao Xu	Kawasaki	2:16.843	+32.022

MX2 Timed Practice

Position	No.	Driver	Constructor	Time	Time Gap
1	4	(France) Dylan Ferrandis	Kawasaki	1:42.491	
2	84	(Netherlands) Jeffrey Herlings	KTM	1:42.544	+0.053
3	41	(Latvia) Pauls Jonass	KTM	1:42.881	+0.390
4	59	(Russia) Aleksandr Tonkov	Yamaha	1:43.532	+1.041
5	91	(Switzerland) Jeremy Seewer	Suzuki	1:43.680	+1.189
6	152	(Bulgaria) Petar Petrov	Kawasaki	1:43.899	+1.408
7	6	(France) Benoit Paturel	Yamaha	1:44.030	+1.539
8	189	(Netherlands) Brian Bogers	KTM	1:44.062	+1.571
9	99	(United Kingdom) Max Anstie	Husqvarna	1:44.079	+1.588
10	95	(Latvia) Roberts Justs	KTM	1:44.526	+2.035
11	64	(United States) Thomas Covington	Husqvarna	1:44.624	+2.133
12	161	(Sweden) Alvin Östlund	Yamaha	1:44.659	+2.168
13	321	(Italy) Samuele Bernardini	TM	1:44.730	+2.239
14	18	(Russia) Vsevolod Brylyakov	Kawasaki	1:44.735	+2.244
15	172	(Belgium) Brent van Donninck	Yamaha	1:45.266	+2.775
16	101	(Spain) Jorge Zaragoza	Honda	1:45.648	+3.157
17	88	(Netherlands) Freek van der Vlist	Kawasaki	1:46.404	+3.913
18	71	(Belgium) Damon Graulus	Honda	1:46.661	+4.170
19	919	(United Kingdom) Ben Watson	Husqvarna	1:46.855	+4.364
20	29	(Germany) Henry Jacobi	Honda	1:47.215	+4.724
21	251	(Belgium) Jens Getteman	KTM	1:47.317	+4.826
22	97	(Bulgaria) Michael Ivanov	KTM	1:47.437	+4.946
23	132	(Estonia) Karel Kutsar	KTM	1:49.476	+6.985
24	500	(Japan) Nozomu Yasuhara	Yamaha	1:52.358	+9.867
25	93	(Thailand) Phanuphong Somsawat	Kawasaki	1:56.415	+13.923
26	28	(Thailand) Ben Hallgren	Yamaha	1:56.579	+14.088
27	52	(Japan) Shota Ueda	Kawasaki	1:56.839	+14.348
28	76	(Thailand) Jaturong Jomjaturong	Suzuki	2:05.970	+23.479
29	888	(China) Jian Hao Xu	Kawasaki	2:16.089	+33.598

=== MX2 Qualifying Race ===
Position	No.	Driver	Constructor	Laps	Time Gap
1	84	(Netherlands) Jeffrey Herlings	KTM	13	
2	6	(France) Benoit Paturel	Yamaha	13	+20.229
3	99	(United Kingdom) Max Anstie	Husqvarna	13	+29.229
4	59	(Russia) Aleksandr Tonkov	Yamaha	13	+38.926
5	91	(Switzerland) Jeremy Seewer	Suzuki	13	+41.842
6	41	(Latvia) Pauls Jonass	KTM	13	+47.018
7	152	(Bulgaria) Petar Petrov	Kawasaki	13	+49.689
8	321	(Italy) Samuele Bernardini	TM	13	+53.185
9	18	(Russia) Vsevolod Brylyakov	Kawasaki	13	+1:06.408
10	64	(United States) Thomas Covington	Husqvarna	13	1:17.718
11	95	(Latvia) Roberts Justs	KTM	13	+1:21.579
12	189	(Netherlands) Brian Bogers	KTM	13	+1:30.166
13	101	(Spain) Jorge Zaragoza	Honda	13	+1:32.894
14	161	(Sweden) Alvin Östlund	Yamaha	13	+1:34.410
15	88	(Netherlands) Freek van der Vlist	Kawasaki	13	+1:42.781
16	71	(Belgium) Damon Graulus	Honda	13	+1:46.295
17	29	(Germany) Henry Jacobi	Honda	13	+1:46.980
18	251	(Belgium) Jens Getteman	KTM	12	+1 Lap
19	500	(Japan) Nozomu Yasuhara	Yamaha	12	+1 Lap
20	28	(Thailand) Ben Hallgren	Yamaha	12	+1 Lap
21	52	(Japan) Shota Ueda	Kawasaki	12	+1 Lap
22	919	(United Kingdom) Ben Watson	KTM	12	+1 Lap
23	93	(Thailand) Phanuphong Somsawat	Kawasaki	12	+1 Lap
24	888	(China) Jian Hao Xu	Kawasaki	11	+2 Laps
25	76	(Thailand) Jaturong Jomjaturong	Suzuki	10	+3 Laps
	4	(France) Dylan Ferrandis^{1}	Kawasaki	4	Retired
	97	(Bulgaria) Michael Ivanov	KTM	1	Retired
	172	(Belgium) Brent van Doninck	Yamaha	0	Retired
	132	(Estonia) Karel Kutsar	KTM	0	Retired

^{1} Dylan Ferrandis dislocated his shoulder and did not take further part in the Grand Prix.

=== MX2 Races ===
Race 1

Position	No.	Driver	Constructor	Laps	Time Gap	Points
1	84	(Netherlands) Jeffrey Herlings	KTM	19		25
2	59	(Russia) Aleksandr Tonkov	Yamaha	19	+32.233	22
3	91	(Switzerland) Jeremy Seewer	Suzuki	19	+37.383	20
4	6	(France) Benoit Paturel	Yamaha	19	+41.235	18
5	64	(United States) Thomas Covington	Husqvarna	19	+59.709	16
6	152	(Bulgaria) Petar Petrov	Kawasaki	19	+1:12.586	15
7	18	(Russia) Vsevolod Brylyakov	Kawasaki	19	+1:26.229	14
8	321	(Italy) Samuele Bernardini	TM	19	+1:34.550	13
9	41	(Latvia) Pauls Jonass	KTM	19	+1:39.392	12
10	95	(Latvia) Roberts Justs	KTM	18	+1 Lap	11
11	161	(Sweden) Alvin Östlund	Yamaha	18	+1 Lap	10
12	101	(Spain) Jorge Zaragoza	Honda	18	+1 Lap	9
13	132	(Estonia) Karel Kutsar	KTM	18	+1 Lap	8
14	251	(Belgium) Jens Getteman	KTM	18	+1 Lap	7
15	97	(Bulgaria) Michael Ivanov	KTM	18	+1 Lap	6
16	88	(Netherlands) Freek van der Vlist	Kawasaki	18	+1 Lap	5
17	71	(Belgium) Damon Graulus	Honda	18	+1 Lap	4
18	500	(Japan) Nozomu Yasuhara	Yamaha	18	+1 Lap	3
19	189	(Netherlands) Brian Bogers	KTM	17	+2 Laps	2
20	28	(Thailand) Ben Hallgren	Yamaha	17	+2 Laps	1
21	52	(Japan) Shota Ueda	Kawasaki	17	+2 Laps	
22	919	(United Kingdom) Ben Watson	Husqvarna	17	+2 Laps	
23	888	(China) Jian Hao Xu	Kawasaki	16	+3 Laps	
24	76	(Thailand) Jaturong Jomjaturong	Suzuki	15	+4 Laps	
	99	(United Kingdom) Max Anstie	Husqvarna	7	Retired	
	172	(Belgium) Brent van Doninck	Yamaha	7	Retired	
	93	(Thailand) Phanuphong Somsawat	Kawasaki	5	Retired	
	29	(Germany) Henry Jacobi	Honda	0	Retired	
	4	(France) Dylan Ferrandis	Kawasaki		Did Not Start	

Race 2

Position	No.	Driver	Constructor	Laps	Time Gap	Points
1	84	(Netherlands) Jeffrey Herlings	KTM	19		25
2	99	(United Kingdom) Max Anstie	Husqvarna	19	+24.954	22
3	91	(Switzerland) Jeremy Seewer	Suzuki	19	+26.854	20
4	59	(Russia) Aleksandr Tonkov	Yamaha	19	+39.636	18
5	41	(Latvia) Pauls Jonass	KTM	19	+43.934	16
6	6	(France) Benoit Paturel	Yamaha	19	+50.686	15
7	161	(Sweden) Alvin Östlund	Yamaha	19	+1:30.625	14
8	172	(Belgium) Brent van Doninck	Yamaha	19	+1:35.213	13
9	18	(Russia) Vsevolod Brylyakov	Kawasaki	19	+1:36.124	12
10	152	(Bulgaria) Petar Petrov	Kawasaki	19	+1:39.906	11
11	101	(Spain) Jorge Zaragoza	Honda	19	+2:05.574	10
12	321	(Italy) Samuele Bernardini	TM	19	+2:21.573	9
13	95	(Latvia) Roberts Justs	KTM	18	+1 Lap	8
14	919	(United Kingdom) Ben Watson	Husqvarna	18	+1 Lap	7
15	189	(Netherlands) Brian Bogers	KTM	18	+1 Lap	6
16	132	(Estonia) Karel Kutsar	KTM	18	+1 Lap	5
17	71	(Belgium) Damon Graulus	Honda	18	+1 Lap	4
18	97	(Bulgaria) Michael Ivanov	KTM	18	+1 Lap	3
19	500	(Japan) Nozomu Yasuhara	Yamaha	18	+1 Lap	2
20	52	(Japan) Shota Ueda	Kawasaki	18	+1 Lap	1
21	28	(Thailand) Ben Hallgren	Yamaha	17	+2 Laps	
22	88	(Netherlands) Freek van der Vlist	Kawasaki	17	+2 Laps	
23	888	(China) Jian Hao Xu	Kawasaki	15	+4 Laps	
	251	(Belgium) Jens Getteman	KTM	7	Retired	
	76	(Thailand) Jaturong Jomjaturong	Suzuki	7	Retired	
	64	(United States) Thomas Covington	Husqvarna	2	Retired	
	29	(Germany) Henry Jacobi	Honda		Did Not Start	
	93	(Thailand) Phanuphong Somsawat	Kawasaki		Did Not Start	
	4	(France) Dylan Ferrandis	Kawasaki		Did Not Start	

=== MX2 Grand Prix Overall ===
Position	No.	Driver	Constructor	Race 1	Race 2	Points
1	84	(Netherlands) Jeffrey Herlings	KTM	25	25	50
2	91	(Switzerland) Jeremy Seewer	Suzuki	20	20	40
3	59	(Russia) Aleksandr Tonkov	Yamaha	22	18	40
4	6	(France) Benoit Paturel	Yamaha	18	15	33
5	41	(Latvia) Pauls Jonass	KTM	12	16	28
6	18	(Russia) Vsevolod Brylyakov	Kawasaki	14	12	26
7	152	(Bulgaria) Petar Petrov	Kawasaki	15	11	26
8	161	(Sweden) Alvin Östlund	Yamaha	10	14	24
9	99	(United Kingdom) Max Anstie	Husqvarna	0	22	22
10	321	(Italy) Samuele Bernardini	TM	13	9	22
11	101	(Spain) Jorge Zaragoza	Honda	9	10	19
12	95	(Latvia) Roberts Justs	KTM	11	8	19
13	64	(United States) Thomas Covington	Husqvarna	16	0	16
14	172	(Belgium) Brent van Doninck	Yamaha	0	13	13
15	132	(Estonia) Karel Kutsar	KTM	8	5	13
16	97	(Bulgaria) Michael Ivanov	KTM	6	3	9
17	189	(Netherlands) Brian Bogers	KTM	2	6	8
18	71	(Belgium) Damon Graulus	Honda	4	4	8
19	919	(United Kingdom) Ben Watson	KTM	0	7	7
20	251	(Belgium) Jens Getteman	KTM	7	0	7
21	500	(Japan) Nozomu Yasuhara	Yamaha	3	2	5
22	88	(Netherlands) Freek van der Vlist	Kawasaki	5	0	5
23	52	(Japan) Shota Ueda	Kawasaki	0	1	1
24	28	(Thailand) Ben Hallgren	Yamaha	1	0	1
	888	(China) Jian Hao Xu	Kawasaki	0	0	
	76	(Thailand) Jaturong Jomjaturong	Suzuki	0	0	
	93	(Thailand) Phanuphong Somsawat	Kawasaki	0	0	
	29	(Germany) Henry Jacobi	Honda	0	0	
	4	(France) Dylan Ferrandis	Kawasaki	0	0	
