= 2016 FIM Motocross World Championship =

Motocross championship season

The 2016 FIM Motocross World Championship was the 60th FIM Motocross World Championship season. It included 19 events, starting at Losail International Circuit in Qatar on 27 February, and ending at Glen Helen Raceway in the United States on 11 September. In the main MXGP class, Romain Febvre was the defending champion after taking his first title in 2015. In the MX2 class, Tim Gajser was the defending champion, after taking his first title in 2015.

== Race calendar and results ==
A 19-round calendar for the 2016 season was announced on 14 October 2015.

=== MXGP ===
Round	Date	Grand Prix	Location	Race 1 Winner	Race 2 Winner	Round Winner	Report
1	27 February	Qatar	Losail	(Slovenia) Tim Gajser	(Slovenia) Tim Gajser	(Slovenia) Tim Gajser	Report
2	6 March	Thailand	Don Chedi	(France) Romain Febvre	(France) Romain Febvre	(France) Romain Febvre	Report
3	28 March	Netherlands	Valkenswaard	(Slovenia) Tim Gajser	(France) Romain Febvre	(France) Romain Febvre	Report
4	10 April	Argentina	Neuquen	(Germany) Max Nagl	(Slovenia) Tim Gajser	(Slovenia) Tim Gajser	Report
5	17 April	Mexico	Leon	(France) Romain Febvre	(Slovenia) Tim Gajser	(Slovenia) Tim Gajser	Report
6	1 May	Latvia	Ķegums	(Slovenia) Tim Gajser	(France) Romain Febvre	(Slovenia) Tim Gajser	Report
7	8 May	Germany	Teutschenthal	(Italy) Tony Cairoli	(Italy) Tony Cairoli	(Italy) Tony Cairoli	Report
8	15 May	Italy	Pietramurata	(Italy) Tony Cairoli	(France) Romain Febvre	(Italy) Tony Cairoli	Report
9	29 May	Spain	Talavera de la Reina	(Slovenia) Tim Gajser	(Slovenia) Tim Gajser	(Slovenia) Tim Gajser	Report
10	5 June	France	St Jean d'Angely	(Slovenia) Tim Gajser	(France) Romain Febvre	(France) Romain Febvre	Report
11	19 June	United Kingdom	Matterley Basin	(Slovenia) Tim Gajser	(Slovenia) Tim Gajser	(Slovenia) Tim Gajser	Report
12	26 June	Italy	Mantova	(Slovenia) Tim Gajser	(Slovenia) Tim Gajser	(Slovenia) Tim Gajser	Report
13	24 July	Czech Republic	Loket	(Germany) Max Nagl	(Germany) Max Nagl	(Germany) Max Nagl	Report
14	31 July	Belgium	Lommel	(Germany) Max Nagl	(Slovenia) Tim Gajser	(Belgium) Kevin Strijbos	Report
15	7 August	Switzerland	Frauenfeld	(Italy) Tony Cairoli	(Slovenia) Tim Gajser	(Italy) Tony Cairoli	Report
16	28 August	Netherlands	Assen	(United Kingdom) Shaun Simpson	(Italy) Tony Cairoli	(Belgium) Clément Desalle	Report
17	3 September	United States East	Charlotte	(United States) Eli Tomac	(United States) Eli Tomac	(United States) Eli Tomac	Report
18	11 September	United States West	Glen Helen	(United States) Eli Tomac	(United States) Eli Tomac	(United States) Eli Tomac	Report

=== MX2 ===
Round	Date	Grand Prix	Location	Race 1 Winner	Race 2 Winner	Round Winner	Report
1	27 February	Qatar	Losail	(Netherlands) Jeffrey Herlings	(Netherlands) Jeffrey Herlings	(Netherlands) Jeffrey Herlings	Report
2	6 March	Thailand	Don Chedi	(Netherlands) Jeffrey Herlings	(Netherlands) Jeffrey Herlings	(Netherlands) Jeffrey Herlings	Report
3	28 March	Netherlands	Valkenswaard	(Netherlands) Jeffrey Herlings	(Netherlands) Jeffrey Herlings	(Netherlands) Jeffrey Herlings	Report
4	10 April	Argentina	Neuquen	(Netherlands) Jeffrey Herlings	(Netherlands) Jeffrey Herlings	(Netherlands) Jeffrey Herlings	Report
5	17 April	Mexico	Leon	(Netherlands) Jeffrey Herlings	(Netherlands) Jeffrey Herlings	(Netherlands) Jeffrey Herlings	Report
6	1 May	Latvia	Ķegums	(Netherlands) Jeffrey Herlings	(Netherlands) Jeffrey Herlings	(Netherlands) Jeffrey Herlings	Report
7	8 May	Germany	Teutschenthal	(Netherlands) Jeffrey Herlings	(Netherlands) Jeffrey Herlings	(Netherlands) Jeffrey Herlings	Report
8	15 May	Italy	Pietramurata	(France) Dylan Ferrandis	(Netherlands) Jeffrey Herlings	(Netherlands) Jeffrey Herlings	Report
9	29 May	Spain	Talavera de la Reina	(Netherlands) Jeffrey Herlings	(Netherlands) Jeffrey Herlings	(Netherlands) Jeffrey Herlings	Report
10	5 June	France	St Jean d'Angely	(Netherlands) Jeffrey Herlings	(Netherlands) Jeffrey Herlings	(Netherlands) Jeffrey Herlings	Report
11	19 June	United Kingdom	Matterley Basin	(Netherlands) Jeffrey Herlings	(Netherlands) Jeffrey Herlings	(Netherlands) Jeffrey Herlings	Report
12	26 June	Italy	Mantova	(Netherlands) Jeffrey Herlings	(Netherlands) Jeffrey Herlings	(Netherlands) Jeffrey Herlings	Report
13	24 July	Czech Republic	Loket	(France) Dylan Ferrandis	(France) Dylan Ferrandis	(France) Dylan Ferrandis	Report
14	31 July	Belgium	Lommel	(United Kingdom) Max Anstie	(United Kingdom) Max Anstie	(United Kingdom) Max Anstie	Report
15	7 August	Switzerland	Frauenfeld	(United Kingdom) Max Anstie	(United Kingdom) Max Anstie	(United Kingdom) Max Anstie	Report
16	28 August	Netherlands	Assen	(United States) Thomas Covington	(Netherlands) Jeffrey Herlings	(Netherlands) Jeffrey Herlings	Report
17	3 September	United States East	Charlotte	(Netherlands) Jeffrey Herlings	(United States) Cooper Webb	(United States) Cooper Webb	Report
18	11 September	United States West	Glen Helen	(Netherlands) Jeffrey Herlings	(Netherlands) Jeffrey Herlings	(Netherlands) Jeffrey Herlings	Report

=== WMX ===
Round	Date	Grand Prix	Location	Race 1 Winner	Race 2 Winner	Round Winner	Report
1	27 February	Qatar	Losail	(New Zealand) Courtney Duncan	(New Zealand) Courtney Duncan	(New Zealand) Courtney Duncan	Report
2	28 March	Netherlands	Valkenswaard	(Netherlands) Nancy van de Ven	(New Zealand) Courtney Duncan	(Netherlands) Nancy van de Ven	Report
3	8 May	Germany	Teutschenthal	(France) Livia Lancelot	(France) Livia Lancelot	(France) Livia Lancelot	Report
4	5 June	France	St Jean d'Angely	(Netherlands) Nancy van de Ven	(France) Livia Lancelot	(Netherlands) Nancy van de Ven	Report
5	26 June	Italy	Mantova	(Italy) Kiara Fontanesi	(Netherlands) Nancy van de Ven	(Italy) Kiara Fontanesi	Report
6	7 August	Switzerland	Frauenfeld	(New Zealand) Courtney Duncan	(France) Livia Lancelot	(New Zealand) Courtney Duncan	Report
7	28 August	Netherlands	Assen	(New Zealand) Courtney Duncan	(Netherlands) Nancy van de Ven	(New Zealand) Courtney Duncan	Report

== Participants ==
=== MXGP ===
Team	Constructor	No	Rider	Rounds
Monster Energy Kawasaki Racing Team	Kawasaki	3	(United States) Eli Tomac	17–18
Monster Energy Kawasaki Racing Team	Kawasaki	25	(Belgium) Clement Desalle	1–7, 9–18
Monster Energy Kawasaki Racing Team	Kawasaki	911	(France) Jordi Tixier	8–18
Scoccia Racing Team	Kawasaki	5	(Italy) Nicola Recchia	8, 12
	Husqvarna	7	(Estonia) Tanel Leok	1^{‡}
	KTM	7	(Estonia) Tanel Leok	2^{‡}–3, 6–9, 11–16
Suzuki World MXGP	Suzuki	8	(New Zealand) Ben Townley	1–3, 6–8, 11–12
Suzuki World MXGP	Suzuki	22	(Belgium) Kevin Strijbos	1–9, 13–18
Suzuki World MXGP	Suzuki	177	(Lithuania) Arminas Jasikonis	13–18
24MX Honda	Honda	9	(Belgium) Ken De Dycker	16
24MX Honda	Honda	63	(Netherlands) Ceriel Klein Kromhof	6
24MX Honda	Honda	71	(Belgium) Damon Graulus	10–11, 13–16
24MX Honda	Honda	191	(Latvia) Matīss Karro	9, 12
24MX Honda	Honda	221	(Estonia) Priit Rätsep	9–12, 14, 16
24MX Honda	Honda	685	(France) Steven Lenoir	3–7
Castrol Power1 Suzuki	Suzuki	11	(Sweden) Filip Bengtsson	3, 6, 11–12
Rockstar Energy Husqvarna Factory Racing	Husqvarna	12	(Germany) Max Nagl	All
Rockstar Energy Husqvarna Factory Racing	Husqvarna	23	(France) Christophe Charlier	1–14
Red Bull KTM Factory Racing	KTM	15	(United Kingdom) Dean Wilson	17–18
Red Bull KTM Factory Racing	KTM	222	(Italy) Tony Cairoli	All
Red Bull KTM Factory Racing	KTM	259	(Netherlands) Glenn Coldenhoff	All
Marchetti Racing KTM	KTM	17	(Spain) José Butrón	All
DP19 Racing Team	Yamaha	19	(Italy) David Philippaerts	3, 7–8, 12, 15
2b Moreco Yamaha	Yamaha	20	(France) Gregory Aranda	7–8
Team HRC	Honda	21	(France) Gautier Paulin	1–2, 8–18
Team HRC	Honda	777	(Russia) Evgeny Bobryshev	All
Wilvo Forkrent KTM	KTM	24	(United Kingdom) Shaun Simpson	1–11, 13–18
JK Racing Yamaha	Yamaha	31	(United Kingdom) Alex Snow	1–2, 6, 11–16
JK Racing Yamaha	Yamaha	201	(France) Cedric Soubeyras	8–11
JK Racing Yamaha	Yamaha	212	(Belgium) Jeffrey Dewulf	16
JK Racing Yamaha	Yamaha	371	(Italy) Manuel Iacopi	12
Tip Top MP32 Racing	Yamaha	32	(France) Milko Potisek	1–12
Autotrader JGRMX Yamaha	Yamaha	34	(United States) Philip Nicoletti	17
Autotrader JGRMX Yamaha	Yamaha	51	(United States) Justin Barcia	17
Team Honda Racing Argentina	Honda	35	(Argentina) Rodrigo Landa	4
GBO Sports KTM	KTM	36	(Italy) Matteo Bonini	12, 15
Phoenix Tools Honda	Honda	37	(Estonia) Gert Krestinov	3, 11, 14–15
Honda RedMoto World Enduro Team	Honda	39	(Italy) Davide Guarneri	15
Cab Screens LiuGong Husqvarna	Husqvarna	42	(United Kingdom) James Harrison	11
Cab Screens LiuGong Husqvarna	Husqvarna	195	(United Kingdom) Dan Thornhill	11
Team Geartec Yamaha	Yamaha	44	(United Kingdom) Elliott Banks-Browne	3
Hitachi Construction Husqvarna	Husqvarna	45	(United Kingdom) Jake Nicholls	3, 6–18
CDP Cortenuova	Yamaha	48	(Slovenia) Peter Irt	7–11, 15
CDP Cortenuova	Yamaha	49	(Slovenia) Jernej Irt	12–15
Gebben Van Vanrooij Kawasaki	Kawasaki	50	(Latvia) Toms Macuks	3, 6–7, 10–14, 16
No Fear Energy BT Motorsport	Honda	53	(Netherlands) Micha-Boy De Waal	14
	Honda	58	(Argentina) Nicolas Carranza	4
62 Motorsport Honda	Honda	62	(Slovenia) Klemen Gercar	3, 15
Monster Energy Pro Circuit Kawasaki	Kawasaki	66	(Switzerland) Arnaud Tonus	18
Cofain Racing Team	KTM	67	(Czech Republic) Petr Smitka	13
Cofain Racing Team	KTM	909	(Austria) Lukas Neurauter	13
Team Assomotor Honda	Honda	77	(Italy) Alessandro Lupino	1–5, 7–18
Team Assomotor Honda	Honda	400	(Japan) Kei Yamamoto	1–9, 12, 16–18
Wenger-bike.ch KTM	KTM	78	(Switzerland) Yves Furlato	15
Solarys Racing ssdarl	Husqvarna	80	(San Marino) Thomas Marini	8, 15
Kosak KTM Racing Team	KTM	82	(Switzerland) Andy Baumgartner	15
Yamaha Factory Racing Yamalube	Yamaha	89	(Belgium) Jeremy van Horebeek	All
Yamaha Factory Racing Yamalube	Yamaha	461	(France) Romain Febvre	1–11, 13–18
Yamaha Factory Racing Yamalube	Yamaha	22G	(Australia) Chad Reed	11–12
Kemea Yamaha Racing Team	Yamaha	92	(Switzerland) Valentin Guillod	All
Monster Energy DRT Kawasaki	Kawasaki	100	(United Kingdom) Tommy Searle	All
	Kawasaki	108	(Argentina) Jeremias Durbano	4
Team Honda Quintanilla Racing	Honda	111	(Chile) Leonardo Quintanilla	4
Yamaha Argentina	Yamaha	112	(Argentina) Marcos Trossero	4
Yamaha Argentina	Yamaha	444	(Argentina) Ezequiel Fanello	4
	Honda	115	(Uruguay) Jhonatan Carbajal	4
Team Bud Racing	Kawasaki	121	(France) Xavier Boog	10
Got Gear Motorsports/Joe Moto Racing	KTM	124	(United States) Heath Harrison	17
	Yamaha	131	(Thailand) Chaiyan Romphan	2
Sportland 2 LaPorte Flooring	Yamaha	139	(United States) Nathen LaPorte	17–18
Sarholz KTM	KTM	149	(Germany) Dennis Ullrich	3, 6–7, 9–13, 15
Sarholz KTM	KTM	151	(Finland) Harri Kullas	3, 6, 9–16
Sarholz KTM	KTM	156	(Germany) Angus Heidecke	3, 6–10, 12
Sarholz KTM	KTM	430	(Finland) Valterri Malin	3, 6–10, 12, 14–15
SDM Racing Team	Husqvarna	158	(Italy) Marco Maddii	7–10, 12, 15, 17–18
Metcon CCR TM	TM	162	(Republic of Ireland) Stuart Edmonds	11
AGMX Honda	Honda	166	(Switzerland) Alain Schafer	10, 15
	Kawasaki	171	(Thailand) Thanarat Penjan	2
Martin Honda Junior Team	Honda	173	(Italy) Pier Filippo Bertuzzo	7–8, 12–13
Team Pfeil Kawasaki	Kawasaki	177	(Lithuania) Arminas Jasikonis	3, 6–7
	Honda	181	(Argentina) Demian Villar	4
Team MAX2	Suzuki	193	(Czech Republic) Jaromir Romancik	13
Bikesport KTM	KTM	211	(United Kingdom) James Hutchinson	3
JH MX Service	KTM	212	(Belgium) Jeffrey Dewulf	3, 14
Team Muzi	Honda	214	(Italy) Samuel Zeni	8
	Honda	219	(Chile) Raczo Tudor	4
Breizh Loire Racing Team	Kawasaki	224	(France) Morgan Jacquelin	10
	Yamaha	225	(Mexico) Eduardo Andrade	5
MBO Sport KTM	KTM	241	(United Kingdom) Liam Garland	11
Gariboldi Honda	Honda	243	(Slovenia) Tim Gajser	All
FMX4EVER KTM	KTM	251	(Belgium) Jens Getteman	11–15
	KTM	278	(United States) Parker Anthony	17
	KTM	293	(Sweden) Jonathan Bengtsson	16
KTM Scandinavia	KTM	294	(Sweden) Viktor Björklund	8
	KTM	300	(Russia) Viacheslav Golovkin	6
Gary Jones Racing	Honda	315	(Sweden) Nicklas Gustavsson	17–18
Glory Hills MX	Honda	316	(United States) Drew Craven	17
Team KTM Maquina Motors JCR Rockstar	KTM	348	(Spain) Joan Cros	9
	Yamaha	351	(Argentina) Nicolas Fanello	4
	Yamaha	391	(United States) Connor Olson	17
Flyin Taco Racing	Yamaha	421	(United States) Carlos Short	17
	Honda	462	(United States) Michael Starace	17
Carl's Cycle Sales	Kawasaki	468	(United States) Austin Kouba	18
RMX Honda	Honda	482	(United States) Riley Brough	18
SLMX School	KTM	505	(Guam) Sean Lipanovich	18
Rent MX Team	KTM	511	(Belgium) Kevin Wouts	16
	Kawasaki	517	(United States) Jared Hicks	17
Factory Edge Honda	Honda	526	(United States) Colton Aeck	18
Tulare Suzuki	Suzuki	542	(United States) Johnnie Buller	18
	Honda	595	(Ecuador) Andres Benenaula	17–18
MX Moduls	Yamaha	600	(Latvia) Dāvis Ivanovs	3, 6
DMP Motorsports	Yamaha	608	(United States) David Pulley	18
	Yamaha	619	(United States) Mark Weishaar	17
Keskus Yamaha	Yamaha	621	(Estonia) Andero Lusbo	6, 13
Haeseker Racing	Yamaha	636	(United States) Keith Knight	18
Pro Tec Coatings	Yamaha	650	(United States) Cody Johnston	18
Compression Generation Services	Honda	655	(Canada) John Pauk	17–18
Team Marelli Sports	Yamaha	702	(Argentina) Marco Schmit	4
Team SR Motoblouz	Honda	737	(France) Valentin Teillet	10
Lainer Kawasaki	Kawasaki	743	(Italy) Nicolo Gobbi	18
HFour Raceland	Kawasaki	749	(Switzerland) Vincent Seiler	15
Scott KTM	KTM	878	(Italy) Stefano Pezzuto	8
OB1 Motorsport Suzuki	Suzuki	903	(France) Nicolas Aubin	10
F&H Racing Team	Kawasaki	920	(Spain) Ander Valentin	3, 6–14
KMP Honda	Honda	922	(Belgium) Kevin Fors	7, 10
KMP Honda	Honda	926	(Belgium) Jeremy Delince	7
Kehrli-Automoto.com	Yamaha	924	(Switzerland) William Kehrli	15
	Yamaha	925	(Argentina) Jeremias Fernandez	4
GDI Husqvarna	Husqvarna	941	(Netherlands) Rick Satink	14, 16
Megan Racing	KTM	997	(Italy) Riccardo Righi	8, 12
NewHolland Ottobiano Massignani Husqvarna	Husqvarna	999	(Portugal) Rui Gonçalves	6–16

=== MX2 ===
Team	Constructor	No	Rider	Rounds
Monster Energy Kawasaki MX2 Racing	Kawasaki	4	(France) Dylan Ferrandis	1–2, 6–15
Monster Energy Kawasaki MX2 Racing	Kawasaki	152	(Bulgaria) Petar Petrov	1–16
Kemea Yamaha Racing Team	Yamaha	6	(France) Benoît Paturel	1–18
Kemea Yamaha Racing Team	Yamaha	16	(Latvia) Kārlis Sabulis	11–13
Kemea Yamaha Racing Team	Yamaha	172	(Belgium) Brent Van Doninck	1–3, 6–9, 14–18
GEICO Honda	Honda	6G	(United States) Jeremy Martin	18
HSF Logistics Motorsport Team	KTM	10	(Netherlands) Calvin Vlaanderen	1, 3–10, 13–18
HSF Logistics Motorsport Team	KTM	95	(Latvia) Roberts Justs	2–10, 16
HSF Logistics Motorsport Team	KTM	189	(Netherlands) Brian Bogers	1–3, 6–18
Marchetti Racing KTM	KTM	14	(Switzerland) Christopher Valente	3–16
Marchetti Racing KTM	KTM	97	(Bulgaria) Michael Ivanov	1–3, 6–16
Marchetti Racing KTM	KTM	128	(Italy) Ivo Monticelli	7–18
SDM Racing Team	Husqvarna	15	(Italy) Davide Bonini	3, 6–8, 11–16
Star Racing Yamaha	Yamaha	17	(United States) Cooper Webb	17
Star Racing Yamaha	Yamaha	289	(United States) Mitchell Harrison	17–18
Monster Energy DRT Kawasaki	Kawasaki	18	(Russia) Vsevolod Brylyakov	1–10, 12
	Yamaha	28	(Thailand) Ben Hallgren	2
Honda Jtech	Honda	29	(Germany) Henry Jacobi	1–11, 13–16
Honda Jtech	Honda	71	(Belgium) Damon Graulus	1–6
Honda Jtech	Honda	223	(Italy) Giuseppe Tropepe	10, 13–16
TM Satellite Team	TM	30	(Sweden) Eddie Hjortmarker	7, 12
Standing Construct-Wilvo-Yamaha	Yamaha	33	(Belgium) Julien Lieber	
Standing Construct-Wilvo-Yamaha	Yamaha	59	(Russia) Aleksandr Tonkov	1–5, 7–12
Standing Construct-Wilvo-Yamaha	Yamaha	161	(Sweden) Alvin Östlund	1–18
Monster Energy Pro Circuit Kawasaki	Kawasaki	35	(United States) Chris Alldredge	18
Monster Energy Pro Circuit Kawasaki	Kawasaki	44	(United States) Adam Cianciarulo	17
Monster Energy Pro Circuit Kawasaki	Kawasaki	214	(United States) Austin Forkner	17–18
CDP Cortenuova	Yamaha	40	(Italy) Simone Zecchina	3, 6–15
Red Bull KTM Factory Racing	KTM	41	(Latvia) Pauls Jonass	1–13
Red Bull KTM Factory Racing	KTM	46	(Netherlands) Davy Pootjes	1, 3–6, 11–14
Red Bull KTM Factory Racing	KTM	61	(Spain) Jorge Prado	14, 16–18
Red Bull KTM Factory Racing	KTM	84	(Netherlands) Jeffrey Herlings	1–12, 16–18
NewHolland Ottobiano Massignani Husqvarna	Husqvarna	43	(Italy) Davide de Bortoli	3, 6, 8, 12
NewHolland Ottobiano Massignani Husqvarna	Husqvarna	223	(Italy) Giuseppe Tropepe	3, 6–8
NewHolland Ottobiano Massignani Husqvarna	Husqvarna	991	(Italy) Nicholas Lapucci	9–16
JK Racing Yamaha	Yamaha	47	(United Kingdom) Paul Coates	8
JK Racing Yamaha	Yamaha	164	(United States) Dakota Alix	9–10
JK Racing Yamaha	Yamaha	174	(United Kingdom) Alfie Smith	1, 6
Troy Lee Designs KTM	KTM	48	(United States) Mitchell Oldenburg	18
Troy Lee Designs KTM	KTM	154	(United States) Justin Hill	18
Troy Lee Designs KTM	KTM	237	(United States) Justin Hoeft	18
Troy Lee Designs KTM	KTM	485	(Australia) Caleb Ward	18
	Kawasaki	52	(Japan) Shota Ueda	2
Caparvi Racing Team	Yamaha	60	(San Marino) Bryan Toccaceli	15
Rockstar Energy Husqvarna Factory Racing	Husqvarna	64	(United States) Thomas Covington	1–5, 10–18
Rockstar Energy Husqvarna Factory Racing	Husqvarna	99	(United Kingdom) Max Anstie	1–18
Rockstar Energy Husqvarna Factory Racing	Husqvarna	426	(United Kingdom) Conrad Mewse	6–16
CreyMert Racing Team	KTM	66	(Spain) Iker Larranaga	3, 6–18
Sahkar KTM	KTM	75	(Estonia) Hardi Roosiorg	3, 6, 10–11, 14–16
Sahkar KTM	KTM	132	(Estonia) Karel Kutsar	3, 6–8, 12–16
	Suzuki	76	(Thailand) Jaturong Jomjaturong	2
Jimmy Joe's Yamaha	Yamaha	79	(Netherlands) Jaap Corneth	3, 6–13
Suzuki World MX2	Suzuki	81	(Germany) Brian Hsu	11–15
Suzuki World MX2	Suzuki	91	(Switzerland) Jeremy Seewer	1–18
Suzuki World MX2	Suzuki	98	(Netherlands) Bas Vaessen	13, 16–18
Suzuki World MX2	Suzuki	301	(Japan) Junya Takenaka	14–15
	Kawasaki	83	(Thailand) Phanuphong Somsawat	2
Falcon KTM	KTM	83	(Belgium) Nathan Renkens	10–12, 14–16
	Kawasaki	85	(Argentina) Agustin Carrasco	4
	Kawasaki	86	(Chile) Felipe Danke	4
HNR GPR PROMO	Kawasaki	88	(Netherlands) Frederik van der Vlist	1–3, 6–11, 14–16
SKS Racing Husqvarna	Husqvarna	94	(Netherlands) Sven van der Mierden	16
SKS Racing Husqvarna	Husqvarna	107	(Netherlands) Lars van Berkel	3, 7, 12, 14, 16
Gariboldi Honda	Honda	101	(Spain) Jorge Zaragoza	1–14
Gariboldi Honda	Honda	281	(Japan) Chihiro Notsuka	15
Gariboldi Honda	Honda	338	(France) David Herbreteau	3, 6–9
MX Slovakia	KTM	102	(Slovakia) Richard Sikyna	11–13, 15
Team SR Motoblouz	Honda	103	(France) Dan Houzet	10
Team VHR	Kawasaki	110	(France) Alexis Verhaeghe	3, 6–7
Team VHR	Kawasaki	474	(Belgium) Bryan Boulard	3, 6–14
	Kawasaki	113	(Chile) Matias Gallardo	4
Bodo Schmidt Motorsport	Husqvarna	116	(Denmark) Thomas Kjer Olsen	15–16
APJ Racing Team	Yamaha	117	(Slovenia) Anej Doplihar	15
	Yamaha	129	(Mexico) Carlo Ivan Gomez	5
	KTM	132	(Estonia) Karel Kutsar	1–2^{‡}
	KTM	138	(United States) Blake Lilly	18
	Kawasaki	140	(United States) Austin Root	17
	KTM	142	(Bulgaria) Ivan Petrov	3, 6–9
Diga Junior Racing Team	KTM	147	(Finland) Miro Sihvonen	16
Diga Junior Racing Team	KTM	313	(Czech Republic) Petr Polak	13
	Yamaha	175	(Argentina) Víctor Garrido	4
LHL Racing	Yamaha	188	(Netherlands) Joshua van der Linden	16
	Honda	194	(Chile) Javier Vasquez	4
	Honda	197	(Argentina) Igniacio Toya	4
ProStyleMX.com Suzuki	Suzuki	199	(United States) Russell Lineman	17
Hitachi Construction Husqvarna	Husqvarna	200	(United Kingdom) James Dunn	7–8, 11
Hitachi Construction Husqvarna	Husqvarna	919	(United Kingdom) Ben Watson	1–4
Honda of Houston	Honda	216	(United States) Vann Martin	17–18
	Yamaha	228	(Argentina) Benjamin Cassano	4
IBCorp Yamaha	Yamaha	232	(United States) Marshal Weltin	17
Silver Action KTM	KTM	251	(Belgium) Jens Getteman	1–3, 6, 9
Silver Action KTM	KTM	441	(Italy) Davide Cislaghi	11–12, 14–15
Silver Action KTM	KTM	945	(France) Anthony Bourdon	8
Team KTM Maquina Motors JCR Rockstar	KTM	280	(Spain) Sergio Sanchez	9
HFour MX Raceland Team	Husqvarna	311	(Switzerland) Loris Freidig	15
TM Factory Racing Team	TM	321	(Italy) Samuele Bernardini	1–18
Autotrader JGRMX Yamaha	Yamaha	359	(Bulgaria) Stoyan Rashkov	17
RFX KTM	KTM	360	(United Kingdom) Nathan Dixon	10–12
Sturm Racing Team	KTM	377	(Czech Republic) Martin Krc	13
Estonian Express Racing Team	KTM	417	(Estonia) Erki Kahro	15
Bud Racing Kawasaki	Kawasaki	457	(United States) Darian Sanayei	17–18
Team Yamaha Ausio	Yamaha	490	(Spain) Francesc Mataro	3, 6–16
	Yamaha	500	(Japan) Nozomu Yasuhara	2
	Kawasaki	510	(Mexico) Oscar Alejandro Sanchez	5
Motolabo Suzuki	Suzuki	520	(France) Jimmy Clochet	10
	Suzuki	611	(Argentina) Nahuel Kriger	4
Martin Junior Racing	Honda	747	(Italy) Michele Cervellin	3, 6–10, 12–16
	Husqvarna	776	(Austria) Pascal Rauchenecker	15
Dubost Sport Loisir	Husqvarna	783	(France) Enzo Toriani	11
Wilvo Forkrent KTM	KTM	811	(United Kingdom) Adam Sterry	1, 7–14, 16
JD 191 KTM	KTM	288	(Czech Republic) Jan Vondrasek	11–13
JD 191 KTM	KTM	831	(Poland) Tomasz Wysocki	3, 8
	Kawasaki	888	(China) Jian Hao Xu	2
SM Action	Yamaha	951	(Italy) Simone Furlotti	7–10, 12–13, 15
Yamaha Motor France	Yamaha	959	(France) Maxime Renaux	16
GRMX Pro Kawasaki	Kawasaki	969	(Spain) Carlos Fernandez	9
	KTM	981	(Netherlands) Wesley Mars	14

^‡ – Tanel Leok and Karel Kutsar were using standard shop motorcycles at the first round in Qatar and at the second round in Thailand.

== Championship standings ==
=== MXGP ===
==== Riders' championship ====
Pos	Rider	Bike	QAT (Qatar)		THA (Thailand)		NED (Netherlands)		ARG (Argentina)		MEX (Mexico)		LAT (Latvia)		GER (Germany)		TRE (Italy)		ESP (Spain)		FRA (France)		GBR (United Kingdom)		ITA (Italy)		CZE (Czech Republic)		BEL (Belgium)		SUI (Switzerland)		NED (Netherlands)		CLT (United States)		GLH (United States)		Points
1	(Slovenia) Gajser	Honda	1	1	3	5	1	8	3	1	2	1	1	4	2	4	4	4	1	1	1	2	1	1	1	1	2	2	15	1	9	1	12	28	4	2	4	3	731
2	(Italy) Cairoli	KTM	6	4	2	12	7	2	2	2	6	9	3	2	1	1	1	2	5	9	3	7	2	10	6	3	7	8	6	2	1	5	4	1	13	14	2	2	647
3	(Germany) Nagl	Husqvarna	12	6	21	3	2	4	1	5	3	3	2	5	3	6	2	8	2	2	7	10	7	2	4	16	1	1	1	7	10	13	6	4	10	9	3	4	603
4	(France) Febvre	Yamaha	3	2	1	1	3	1	6	3	1	2	5	1	10	3	6	1	9	4	2	1	DNS	DNS			3	3	5	27	8	2	14	5	9	6	33	6	564
5	(Russia) Bobryshev	Honda	2	3	4	7	4	6	4	12	4	4	9	6	8	2	9	3	6	5	4	3	4	5	7	6	12	7	10	6	12	4	11	9	11	4	11	8	545
6	(Belgium) Van Horebeek	Yamaha	4	5	5	4	5	3	5	4	11	7	4	3	6	29	5	5	8	7	5	18	6	8	5	7	4	5	7	4	4	10	5	6	3	5	5	14	536
7	(Netherlands) Coldenhoff	KTM	7	10	15	19	13	7	9	6	10	10	10	15	16	11	16	16	32	11	9	5	10	15	8	5	6	18	8	5	11	3	3	3	6	3	6	12	406
8	(Belgium) Desalle	Kawasaki	20	19	16	20	9	19	7	11	5	5	18	31	DNS	DNS			3	6	8	4	17	4	2	4	5	4	4	10	3	16	2	2	5	7	DNS	DNS	372
9	(Switzerland) Guillod	Yamaha	14	12	11	10	12	16	13	8	9	8	13	10	14	5	23	7	7	8	6	8	3	7	9	8	13	10	18	18	5	37	10	14	32	12	14	11	352
10	(United Kingdom) Simpson	KTM	5	7	9	6	10	9	8	9	8	17	14	7	9	8	11	10	11	10	DNS	DNS	19	DNS			16	13	2	12	13	8	1	16	14	13	12	9	343
11	(Belgium) Strijbos	Suzuki	8	9	8	11	6	5	11	7	7	11	6	27	5	10	3	6	22	30							11	11	3	3	18	9	15	15	12	10	9	13	331
12	(United Kingdom) Searle	Kawasaki	9	8	6	14	8	18	10	27	12	6	32	9	13	9	12	33	10	31	33	9	8	14	DSQ	14	9	9	32	9	7	6	13	11	15	11	7	30	302
13	(France) Paulin	Honda	10	21	7	9											35	9	4	3	DNS	DNS	5	3	3	2	10	12	13	24	2	11	19	18	8	30	10	5	270
14	(France) Tixier	Kawasaki															13	11	15	13	10	11	9	6	11	10	8	6	12	20	6	7	8	10	7	8	15	10	236
15	(Spain) Butrón	KTM	13	15	13	8	30	17	16	16	16	14	17	17	18	14	14	13	12	12	12	12	13	9	10	9	18	21	23	19	16	17	22	25	34	16	16	17	201
16	(France) Charlier	Husqvarna	17	17	10	16	25	10	12	10	13	12	8	8	4	13	10	22	25	14	11	14	12	21	14	12	14	14	29	30									198
17	(Estonia) Leok	Husqvarna	16	13	17	17	11	12					12	12	15	15	8	14	14	19			20	16	16	13	15	15	9	11	14	12	9	8					193
18	(New Zealand) Townley	Suzuki	11	11	23	2	14	31					7	13	7	7	7	15					35	12	38	37													128
19	(France) Potisek	Yamaha	15	14	12	15	35	20	14	13	14	13	11	11	17	16	21	17	29	15	18	13	21	11	30	38													119
20	(Italy) Lupino	Honda	18	16	14	13	16	32	18	15	15	18			19	30	19	12	16	17	34	26	23	13	18	11	21	20	24	34	15	14	30	20	18	17	18	16	119
21	(United Kingdom) Nicholls	Husqvarna					18	33					16	16	11	12	15	19	13	20	13	31	11	29	13	17	34	23	14	13	37	38	20	13	17	35	17	18	114
22	(United States) Tomac	Kawasaki																																	1	1	1	1	100
23	(Finland) Kullas	KTM					17	10					15	32					20	18	23	17	26	18	19	18	23	19	17	25	20	19	16	12					59
24	(Lithuania) Jasikonis	Kawasaki					19	21					19	20	23	18																							51
24	(Lithuania) Jasikonis	Suzuki																									17	24	16	8	34	22	18	7	22	36	19	19	51
25	(Portugal) Gonçalves	Husqvarna											27	18	27	23	22	32	19	16	21	16	25	25	35	19	19	17	20	15	25	18	7	19					49
26	(Germany) Ullrich	KTM					28	27					31	22	21	20			18	21	17	6	15	31	33	20	25	16			22	15							41
27	(Japan) Yamamoto	Honda	19	18	18	18	29	28	17	17	18	19	26	24	28	17	18	18	31	DNS					21	23							DNS	DNS	20	18	20	20	40
28	(France) Lenoir	Honda					26	15	15	14	17	15	20	14	20	34																							38
29	(Belgium) Getteman	KTM																					16	30	12	24	24	31	11	14	DNS	DNS							31
30	(United Kingdom) Wilson	KTM																																	16	31	8	15	24
31	(United States) Barcia	Yamaha																																	2	32			22
32	(Switzerland) Tonus	Kawasaki																																			13	7	22
33	(Italy) Philippaerts	Yamaha					33	14							33	21	17	35							17	32					19	21							17
34	(Belgium) Graulus	Honda																			14	34	DNS	DNS			30	22	31	23	17	20	23	17					16
35	(Estonia) Rätsep	Honda																	24	22	32	23	18	20	20	15			27	28			17	29					15
36	(Estonia) Krestinov	Honda					21	13															24	24					30	16	38	DNS							13
37	(Australia) Reed	Yamaha																					14	17	37	DNS													11
38	(Germany) Heidecke	KTM					20	23					33	19	24	19	20	21	17	26	24	30			26	35													10
39	(France) Aranda	Yamaha													12	33	DNS	DNS																					9
40	(Spain) Valentin	Kawasaki					24	25					24	28	25	26	29	28	21	27	20	19	22	26	15	21	32	DNS	28	32									9
41	(Belgium) Dewulf	KTM					15	26																					19	26									8
41	(Belgium) Dewulf	Yamaha																															28	24					8
42	(Mexico) Andrade	Yamaha									19	16																											7
43	(France) Aubin	Suzuki																			22	15																	6
44	(United States) Nicoletti	Yamaha																																	33	15			6
45	(France) Boog	Kawasaki																			15	33																	6
46	(France) Teillet	Honda																			16	32																	5
47	(Netherlands) Satink	Husqvarna																											21	17			24	23					4
48	(United States) H. Harrison	KTM																																	19	19			4
49	(Argentina) E.Fanello	Yamaha							19	19																													4
50	(Argentina) Trossero	Yamaha							23	18																													3
51	(United Kingdom) Snow	Yamaha	21	20	19	21							30	33									29	22	25	25	27	26	26	22	24	24	25	27					3
52	(Sweden) F. Bengtsson	Suzuki					36	35					34	DNS									31	19	23	28													2
53	(France) Soubeyras	Yamaha															24	31	30	28	19	24	27	27															2
54	(Latvia) Macuks	Kawasaki					32	34					21	21	31	22					25	22	33	DNS	22	22	20	29	22	31			26	22					1
55	(Italy) Maddii	Husqvarna													29	27	30	25	28	25	30	27			28	29					23	23			21	20	21	22	1
56	(Argentina) Carranza	Honda							21	20																													1
57	(Argentina) Schmit	Yamaha							20	21																													1
58	(Finland) Malin	KTM					23	22					22	23	30	24	26	34	26	23	29	20			29	27			25	29	27	29							1
59	(Slovenia) P. Irt	Yamaha													26	25	25	20	23	24	26	25	34	DNS							29	27							1
60	(Thailand) Penjan	Honda			20	23																																	1
	(Belgium) Wouts	KTM																															21	21					0
	(Belgium) Fors	Honda													22	28					28	21																	0
	(United States) Aeck	Honda																																			23	21	0
	(Ecuador) Benenaula	Honda																																	25	21	26	28	0
	(Netherlands) De Waal	Honda																											34	21									0
	(Italy) Guarneri	Honda																													21	36							0
	(Argentina) Villar	Honda							22	22																													0
	(Sweden) Gustavsson	Honda																																	26	22	34	25	0
	(Latvia) Ivanovs	Yamaha					22	30					28	30																									0
	(Thailand) Romphan	Yamaha			22	22																																	0
	(Czech Republic) Romancik	Suzuki																									22	33											0
	(Guam) Lipanovich	KTM																																			22	33	0
	(United States) LaPorte	Yamaha																																	23	27	27	24	0
	(United States) Olson	Yamaha																																	24	23			0
	(United States) Kouba	Kawasaki																																			24	23	0
	(Italy) Recchia	Kawasaki															28	23							36	31													0
	(Argentina) Landa	Honda							29	23																													0
	(United Kingdom) Thornhill	Husqvarna																					32	23															0
	(Netherlands) Klein Kromhof	Honda											23	29																									0
	(Italy) Bertuzzo	Honda													32	31	34	24							24	34	31	28											0
	(Chile) Tudor	Honda							26	24																													0
	(United States) Hicks	Kawasaki																																	27	24			0
	(United Kingdom) Hutchinson	KTM					34	24																															0
	(Chile) Quintanilla	Honda							24	30																													0
	(Slovenia) J. Irt	Yamaha																							27	26	26	25	33	33	28	25							0
	(Estonia) Lusbo	Yamaha											25	25													28	27											0
	(United States) Buller	Suzuki																																			25	27	0
	(Canada) Pauk	Honda																																	28	25	30	34	0
	(Uruguay) Carbajal	Honda							30	25																													0
	(Argentina) N.Fanello	Yamaha							25	29																													0
	(Argentina) Fernandez	Yamaha							28	26																													0
	(Switzerland) Baumgartner	KTM																													26	28							0
	(United States) Knight	Yamaha																																			28	26	0
	(Russia) Golovkin	KTM											29	26																									0
	(United States) Short	Yamaha																																	29	26			0
	(Italy) Bonini	KTM																							31	30					39	26							0
	(Italy) Pezzuto	KTM															31	26																					0
	(France) Jacquelin	Kawasaki																			27	29																	0
	(San Marino) Marini	Husqvarna															33	27													33	35							0
	(Slovenia) Gercar	Honda					27	29																							35	33							0
	(Italy) Righi	KTM															27	29							32	33													0
	(Argentina) Durbano	Kawasaki							27	28																													0
	(Spain) Cros	KTM																	27	29																			0
	(Switzerland) Schafer	Honda																			31	28									31	32							0
	(United Kingdom) J. Harrison	Husqvarna																					28	33															0
	(United States) Anthony	KTM																																	35	28			0
	(United States) Johnston	Yamaha																																			29	29	0
	(United States) Craven	Honda																																	31	29			0
	(Czech Republic) Smitka	KTM																									29	32											0
	(Switzerland) Furlato	KTM																													30	31							0
	(Republic of Ireland) Edmonds	TM																					30	28															0
	(Switzerland) Kehrli	Yamaha																													36	30							0
	(United States) Weishaar	Yamaha																																	30	33			0
	(United States) Pulley	Yamaha																																			31	32	0
	(Switzerland) Seiler	Kawasaki																													32	34							0
	(Italy) Zeni	Honda															32	30																					0
	(Latvia) Karro	Honda																	DNS	DNS					34	36													0
	(United Kingdom) Banks-Browne	Yamaha					31	36																															0
	(Belgium) Delince	Honda													34	32																							0
	(United Kingdom) Garland	KTM																					36	32															0
	(Austria) Neurauter	KTM																									33	30											0
	(Belgium) de Dycker	Honda																															29	26					0
	(Sweden) J. Bengtsson	KTM																															27	30					0
	(United States) Starace	Honda																																	36	34			0
	(Italy) Gobbi	Kawasaki																																			32	31	0
	(Sweden) Björklund	KTM															DNS	DNS																					0
	(Italy) Iacopi	Yamaha																							DNS	DNS													0
	(United States) Brough	Honda																																			DNS	DNS	0
Pos	Rider	Bike	QAT (Qatar)		THA (Thailand)		NED (Netherlands)		ARG (Argentina)		MEX (Mexico)		LAT (Latvia)		GER (Germany)		TRE (Italy)		ESP (Spain)		FRA (France)		GBR (United Kingdom)		ITA (Italy)		CZE (Czech Republic)		BEL (Belgium)		SUI (Switzerland)		NED (Netherlands)		CLT (United States)		GLH (United States)		Points

Colour	Result
Gold	Winner
Silver	Second place
Bronze	Third place
Green	Points classification
Blue	Non-points classification
Blue	Non-classified finish (NC)
Purple	Retired, not classified (Ret)
Red	Did not qualify (DNQ)
Red	Did not pre-qualify (DNPQ)
Black	Disqualified (DSQ)
White	Did not start (DNS)
White	Withdrew (WD)
White	Race cancelled (C)
Blank	Did not practice (DNP)
Blank	Did not arrive (DNA)
Blank	Excluded (EX)

==== Manufacturers' championship ====
Pos	Manufacturer	QAT (Qatar)		THA (Thailand)		NED (Netherlands)		ARG (Argentina)		MEX (Mexico)		LAT (Latvia)		GER (Germany)		TRE (Italy)		ESP (Spain)		FRA (France)		GBR (United Kingdom)		ITA (Italy)		CZE (Czech Republic)		BEL (Belgium)		SUI (Switzerland)		NED (Netherlands)		CLT (United States)		GLH (United States)		Points
1	Honda	1	1	3	5	1	6	3	1	2	1	1	4	2	2	4	3	1	1	1	2	1	1	1	1	2	2	10	1	2	1	11	9	4	2	4	3	767
2	Yamaha	3	2	1	1	3	1	5	3	1	2	4	1	6	3	5	1	7	4	2	1	3	7	5	7	3	3	5	4	4	2	5	5	2	5	5	6	697
3	KTM	5	4	2	6	7	2	2	2	6	9	3	2	1	1	1	2	5	9	3	5	2	9	6	3	6	8	2	2	1	3	1	1	6	3	2	2	696
4	Husqvarna	12	6	10	3	2	4	1	5	3	3	2	5	3	6	2	8	2	2	7	10	7	2	4	12	1	1	1	7	10	13	6	4	10	9	3	4	618
5	Kawasaki	9	8	6	14	8	18	7	11	5	5	18	9	13	9	12	11	3	6	8	4	8	4	2	4	5	4	4	9	3	6	2	2	1	1	1	1	553
6	Suzuki	8	9	8	2	6	5	11	7	7	11	6	13	5	7	3	6	22	30	22	15	31	12	23	28	11	11	3	3	18	9	15	7	12	10	9	13	377
7	TM																					30	28															0
Pos	Manufacturer	QAT (Qatar)		THA (Thailand)		NED (Netherlands)		ARG (Argentina)		MEX (Mexico)		LAT (Latvia)		GER (Germany)		TRE (Italy)		ESP (Spain)		FRA (France)		GBR (United Kingdom)		ITA (Italy)		CZE (Czech Republic)		BEL (Belgium)		SUI (Switzerland)		NED (Netherlands)		CLT (United States)		GLH (United States)		Points

=== MX2 ===
==== Riders' championship ====
Pos	Rider	Bike	QAT (Qatar)		THA (Thailand)		NED (Netherlands)		ARG (Argentina)		MEX (Mexico)		LAT (Latvia)		GER (Germany)		TRE (Italy)		ESP (Spain)		FRA (France)		GBR (United Kingdom)		ITA (Italy)		CZE (Czech Republic)		BEL (Belgium)		SUI (Switzerland)		NED (Netherlands)		CLT (United States)		GLH (United States)		Points
1	(Netherlands) Herlings	KTM	1	1	1	1	1	1	1	1	1	1	1	1	1	1	2	1	1	1	1	1	1	1	1	1							2	1	1	3	1	1	739
2	(Switzerland) Seewer	Suzuki	4	5	3	3	4	3	4	2	3	3	4	3	4	2	4	12	11	4	3	4	3	5	6	7	3	2	4	2	2	2	15	13	10	5	11	3	625
3	(France) Paturel	Yamaha	21	8	4	6	7	6	13	5	8	7	9	5	7	4	12	5	4	2	2	3	36	DNS	7	4	4	5	3	7	3	3	5	10	11	6	6	9	512
4	(United Kingdom) Anstie	Husqvarna	10	22	25	2	19	22	2	24	18	2	2	2	3	5	5	16	8	12	21	2	8	4	5	34	2	3	1	1	1	1	8	4	6	10	8	4	504
5	(Latvia) Jonass	KTM	3	3	9	5	2	2	25	4	4	4	3	14	5	12	3	2	3	3	5	5	4	3	10	2	35	DNS											403
6	(Netherlands) Bogers	KTM	13	12	19	15	DNS	DNS					10	7	10	9	18	4	5	8	9	6	10	7	2	3	5	8	5	4	10	4	3	3	8	11	9	7	398
7	(France) Ferrandis	Kawasaki	2	2	DNS	DNS							5	6	2	3	1	3	2	5	6	7	2	2	3	6	1	1	30	3	DNS	DNS							378
8	(Italy) Bernardini	TM	7	10	8	12	21	8	5	6	7	9	11	15	20	6	6	6	10	7	7	11	13	13	13	20	10	6	8	19	4	6	27	7	16	9	13	10	377
9	(Bulgaria) Petrov	Kawasaki	6	6	6	10	3	23	6	8	6	8	6	4	13	11	14	9	35	13	14	8	9	33	39	10	6	7	2	6	9	12	10	28					351
10	(Russia) Tonkov	Yamaha	5	7	2	4	10	11	3	3	5	5			6	13	7	11	6	6	4	10	7	6	12	8													320
11	(United States) Covington	Husqvarna	11	15	5	26	24	38	10	10	12	14									10	31	6	17	4	5	15	4	17	12	8	10	1	16	4	4	4	14	286
12	(Netherlands) Vlaanderen	KTM	DNS	DNS			32	5	7	13	9	11	8	12	11	32	29	23	15	17	DNS	DNS					37	19	7	5	6	5	13	6	5	8	14	22	224
13	(Sweden) Östlund	Yamaha	12	17	11	7	9	10	11	25	11	12	12	9	23	18	11	14	12	19	DNS	DNS	19	19	15	22	16	11	10	13	22	19	11	33	15	15	17	12	222
14	(Russia) Brylyakov	Kawasaki	22	9	7	9	12	9	8	9	2	6	25	10	9	8	9	8	9	18	32	9			35	11													219
15	(Belgium) Van Doninck	Yamaha	8	4	26	8	5	4					7	11	8	7	10	19	36	DNS									18	28	11	15	22	9	12	17	18	6	204
16	(Italy) Cervellin	Honda					14	7					13	25	17	31	21	10	7	10	12	14			11	12	13	16	9	10	14	9	35	15					165
17	(Spain) Larranaga	KTM					17	26					18	20	16	33	16	35	17	14	16	34	11	10	14	13	11	21	16	11	15	34	6	17	14	14	23	DNS	134
18	(Latvia) Justs	KTM			10	13	15	12	14	7	13	19	15	8	26	10	22	7	14	11	17	33											30	DNS					130
19	(United Kingdom) Mewse	Husqvarna											20	24	21	23	26	22	31	26	8	18	5	9	16	9	9	9	12	14	13	8	20	19					126
20	(Spain) Zaragoza	Honda	20	11	12	11	16	34	9	12	10	10	36	32	18	15	19	37	37	20	11	16	17	8	17	32	36	DNS											126
21	(Italy) Monticelli	KTM													37	DNS	13	13	13	15	20	12	24	28	34	39	32	10	15	9	12	7	31	DNS	13	23	DNS	DNS	100
22	(Netherlands) Pootjes	KTM	23	DNS			6	15	16	11	15	15	DNS	DNS									16	31	8	30	8	35	6	31									94
23	(Germany) Jacobi	Honda	15	18	28	DNS	36	30	15	14	14	13	37	16	12	17	37	21	22	21	13	17	20	32			20	15	20	16	17	16	17	30					94
24	(United Kingdom) Sterry	KTM	DNS	DNS											19	22	8	39	23	9	23	13	28	11	9	35	7	17	14	34			28	26					82
25	(United States) Forkner	Kawasaki																																	3	2	3	18	65
26	(Netherlands) v/d Vlist	Kawasaki	18	19	16	22	11	18					22	31	25	20	24	40	18	25	18	15	35	DNS					34	15	30	33	14	11					59
27	(United States) Harrison	Yamaha																																	9	7	5	5	58
28	(Netherlands) van Berkel	Husqvarna					20	19							28	21									24	14			13	8			4	14					56
29	(Denmark) Kjer Olsen	Husqvarna																													7	11	7	5					54
30	(France) Herbreteau	Honda					13	14					14	13	15	14	15	38	16	36																			54
31	(Netherlands) Vaessen	Suzuki																									21	13					9	8	19	16	22	13	48
32	(United States) Webb	Yamaha																																	2	1			47
33	(Spain) Prado	KTM																											DNS	DNS			12	2	17	19	16	16	47
34	(United States) J. Martin	Honda																																			2	2	44
35	(Estonia) Kutsar	KTM	16	20	13	16	34	37					16	33	33	25	32	30							21	16	33	25	11	17	37	DNS	32	20					44
36	(Belgium) Graulus	Honda	17	13	17	17	23	17	12	18	20	DNS	17	19																									43
37	(Germany) Hsu	Suzuki																					15	16	25	17	14	14	19	31	16	14							43
38	(United Kingdom) Watson	Husqvarna	14	14	22	14	8	16	DNS	DNS																													39
39	(United States) Sanayei	Kawasaki																																	7	13	10	17	37
40	(Latvia) Sabulis	Yamaha																					12	12	18	18	12	20											34
41	(Belgium) Getteman	KTM	9	16	14	24	22	13					31	21					21	34																			32
42	(Italy) Tropepe	Husqvarna					37	39					19	17	14	34	17	17																					25
42	(Italy) Tropepe	Honda																			33	DNS					24	18	32	21	25	20	21	29					25
43	(Austria) Rauchenecker	Husqvarna																													5	13							24
44	(United States) Alldredge	Kawasaki																																			7	11	24
45	(Italy) Zecchina	Yamaha					18	21					26	18	22	19	39	20	20	29	15	29	37	18	19	25	18	30	21	35	DNS	DNS							24
46	(United States) Hoeft	KTM																																			12	8	22
47	(Italy) Bonini	Husqvarna					31	36					23	22	27	36	38	26					21	20	40	31	17	12	33	32	18	17	34	31					21
48	(Italy) Furlotti	Yamaha													24	27	25	15	19	33	28	19			22	15	31	29			20	18							20
49	(Switzerland) Valente	KTM					30	28	17	15	16	16	27	27	32	30	34	29	33	30	36	24	34	DNS	31	28	26	33	29	25	33	29	24	25					20
50	(Italy) Lapucci	Husqvarna																	25	24	34	DNS	14	15	20	23	19	32	31	29	32	32	DNS	DNS					16
51	(United Kingdom) Dunn	Yamaha													30	16	23	24					18	14															15
52	(United States) Weltin	Yamaha																																	18	12			12
53	(Bulgaria) Ivanov	KTM	19	21	15	18	27	25					21	23	31	26	27	28	26	28	24	28	22	34	38	33	25	22	24	23	21	36	23	24					11
54	(France) Renaux	Yamaha																															29	12					9
55	(Argentina) Garrido	Yamaha							18	16																													8
56	(Mexico) Gomez	Yamaha									17	17																											8
57	(United States) Lilly	KTM																																			20	15	7
58	(Australia) Ward	KTM																																			15	20	7
59	(United States) Alix	Yamaha																	28	16	19	30																	7
60	(Belgium) Renkens	KTM																			25	22	23	29	27	24			22	20	24	23	16	22					6
61	(Netherlands) v/d Mierden	Husqvarna																															18	18					6
62	(Estonia) Roosiorg	KTM					25	20					32	DNS							29	26	DNS	DNS					23	18	29	26	19	21					6
63	(United States) V. Martin	Honda																																	20	18	21	19	6
64	(Chile) Vasquez	Honda							20	17																													5
65	(Mexico) Sanchez	Kawasaki									19	18																											5
66	(Japan) Yasuhara	Yamaha			18	19																																	5
67	(Poland) Wysocki	KTM					35	29									20	18																					4
68	(United States) Oldenburg	KTM																																			19	21	2
69	(Slovakia) Sikyna	KTM																					26	23	23	19	23	23			31	25							2
70	(Argentina) Toya	Honda							23	19																													2
71	(Estonia) Kahro	KTM																													19	35							2
72	(Argentina) Kriger	Suzuki							19	26																													2
73	(Bulgaria) Rashkov	Yamaha																																	21	20			1
74	(Chile) Danke	Kawasaki							21	20																													1
75	(Japan) Ueda	Kawasaki			21	20																																	1
76	(Thailand) Hallgren	Yamaha			20	21																																	1
77	(Spain) Mataro	Yamaha					29	32					30	26	35	29	35	36	24	23	26	20	30	26	32	27	28	24	25	24	26	24	26	27					1
	(Belgium) Boulard	Kawasaki					28	31					29	34	29	35	30	31	29	27	27	21	29	21	26	21	29	27	27	33									0
	(United States) Lineman	Suzuki																																	22	21			0
	(Japan) Notsuka	Honda																													23	21							0
	(Chile) Gallardo	Kawasaki							26	21																													0
	(Italy) Cislaghi	KTM																					25	24	29	26			26	22	27	22							0
	(Netherlands) Corneth	Yamaha					33	33					35	28	36	24	33	34	27	22	35	27	33	25	28	29	34	31											0
	(Argentina) Carrasco	Kawasaki							24	22																													0
	(Czech Republic) Vondrasek	KTM																					32	22	30	36	27	34											0
	(Czech Republic) Krc	KTM																									22	28											0
	(Argentina) Cassano	Yamaha							22	23																													0
	(France) Houzet	Honda																			22	32																	0
	(China) Jian	Kawasaki			23	23																																	0
	(Netherlands) v/d Linden	Yamaha																															25	23					0
	(France) Clochet	Suzuki																			31	23																	0
	(Bulgaria) I.Petrov	KTM					26	27					24	29	34	28	28	33	30	35																			0
	(France) Verhaeghe	Kawasaki					39	24					28	30	DNS	DNS																							0
	(Thailand) Jomjaturong	Suzuki			24	25																																	0
	(United Kingdom) Dixon	KTM																			30	25	27	27	36	DNS													0
	(Italy) de Bortoli	Husqvarna					38	35					33	DNS			36	25							37	37													0
	(Netherlands) Mars	KTM																											28	26									0
	(Czech Republic) Polak	KTM																									30	26											0
	(Japan) Takenaka	Suzuki																											35	27	34	28							0
	(San Marino) Toccaceli	Yamaha																													28	27							0
	(United Kingdom) Coates	Yamaha															40	27																					0
	(France) Toriani	Husqvarna																					31	30															0
	(Switzerland) Friedig	Husqvarna																													35	30							0
	(France) Bourdon	KTM															31	32																					0
	(Spain) Fernandez	Kawasaki																	32	31																			0
	(Slovenia) Doplihar	Yamaha																													36	31							0
	(Spain) Sanchez	KTM																	34	32																			0
	(Sweden) Hjortmarker	TM													DNS	DNS									33	38													0
	(Finland) Sihvonen	KTM																															33	32					0
	(United States) Root	Kawasaki																																	23	22			0
	(United Kingdom) Smith	Yamaha	DNS	DNS									34	DNS																									0
	(Thailand) Somsawat	Kawasaki			27	DNS																																	0
	(United States) Cianciarulo	Kawasaki																																	24	DNS			0
	(United States) Hill	KTM																																			DNS	DNS	0
Pos	Rider	Bike	QAT (Qatar)		THA (Thailand)		NED (Netherlands)		ARG (Argentina)		MEX (Mexico)		LAT (Latvia)		GER (Germany)		TRE (Italy)		ESP (Spain)		FRA (France)		GBR (United Kingdom)		ITA (Italy)		CZE (Czech Republic)		BEL (Belgium)		SUI (Switzerland)		NED (Netherlands)		USA (United States)		USA (United States)		Points

Colour	Result
Gold	Winner
Silver	Second place
Bronze	Third place
Green	Points classification
Blue	Non-points classification
Blue	Non-classified finish (NC)
Purple	Retired, not classified (Ret)
Red	Did not qualify (DNQ)
Red	Did not pre-qualify (DNPQ)
Black	Disqualified (DSQ)
White	Did not start (DNS)
White	Withdrew (WD)
White	Race cancelled (C)
Blank	Did not practice (DNP)
Blank	Did not arrive (DNA)
Blank	Excluded (EX)

==== Manufacturers' championship ====
Pos	Manufacturer	QAT (Qatar)		THA (Thailand)		NED (Netherlands)		ARG (Argentina)		MEX (Mexico)		LAT (Latvia)		GER (Germany)		TRE (Italy)		ESP (Spain)		FRA (France)		GBR (United Kingdom)		ITA (Italy)		CZE (Czech Republic)		BEL (Belgium)		SUI (Switzerland)		NED (Netherlands)		USA (United States)		USA (United States)		Points
1	KTM	1	1	1	1	1	1	1	1	1	1	1	1	1	1	2	1	1	1	1	1	1	1	1	1	5	8	5	4	6	4	2	1	1	3	1	1	835
2	Kawasaki	2	2	6	9	3	9	6	8	2	6	5	4	2	3	1	3	2	5	6	7	2	2	3	6	1	1	2	3	9	12	10	11	3	2	3	11	641
3	Suzuki	4	5	3	3	4	3	4	2	3	3	4	3	4	2	4	12	11	4	3	4	3	5	6	7	3	2	4	2	2	2	9	8	10	5	11	3	636
4	Yamaha	5	4	2	4	5	4	3	3	5	5	7	5	6	4	7	5	4	2	2	3	7	6	7	4	4	5	3	7	3	3	5	9	2	1	5	5	631
5	Husqvarna	10	14	5	2	8	16	2	10	12	2	2	2	3	5	5	16	8	12	8	2	5	4	4	5	2	3	1	1	1	1	1	4	4	4	4	4	621
6	TM	7	10	8	12	21	8	5	6	7	9	11	15	20	6	6	6	10	7	7	11	13	13	13	20	10	6	8	19	4	6	27	7	16	9	13	10	377
7	Honda	15	11	12	11	13	7	9	12	10	10	13	13	12	14	15	10	7	10	11	14	17	8	11	12	13	15	9	10	14	9	17	15	20	18	2	2	341
Pos	Manufacturer	QAT (Qatar)		THA (Thailand)		NED (Netherlands)		ARG (Argentina)		MEX (Mexico)		LAT (Latvia)		GER (Germany)		TRE (Italy)		ESP (Spain)		FRA (France)		GBR (United Kingdom)		ITA (Italy)		CZE (Czech Republic)		BEL (Belgium)		SUI (Switzerland)		NED (Netherlands)		CLT (United States)		GLH (United States)		Points
