= 2016 MXGP of Argentina =

The 2016 MXGP of Argentina was the fourth round of the 2016 FIM Motocross World Championship season. It will be held at the Neuquén track in Patagonia on 9–10 April 2016 and will include the fourth rounds of the 2016 MXGP and MX2 world championships.
