= Klemen Gerčar =

Slovenian motorcycle racer

- Nationality: Slovenian
- Born: 20 December 1990 (age 35) Lukovica, Slovenia

Motocross career
- Years active: 2008 - 2016
- Teams: Yamaha (2008-2009); KTM (2010-2011); Honda (2012-2014); Husqvarna (2015); Honda (2016)
- Championships: 1
- Wins: 5

Klemen Gerčar (born 20 December 1990) is a former Slovenian professional motocross rider, world champion in MX3 class in 2013.
