= Clément Desalle =

Belgian motorcycle racer

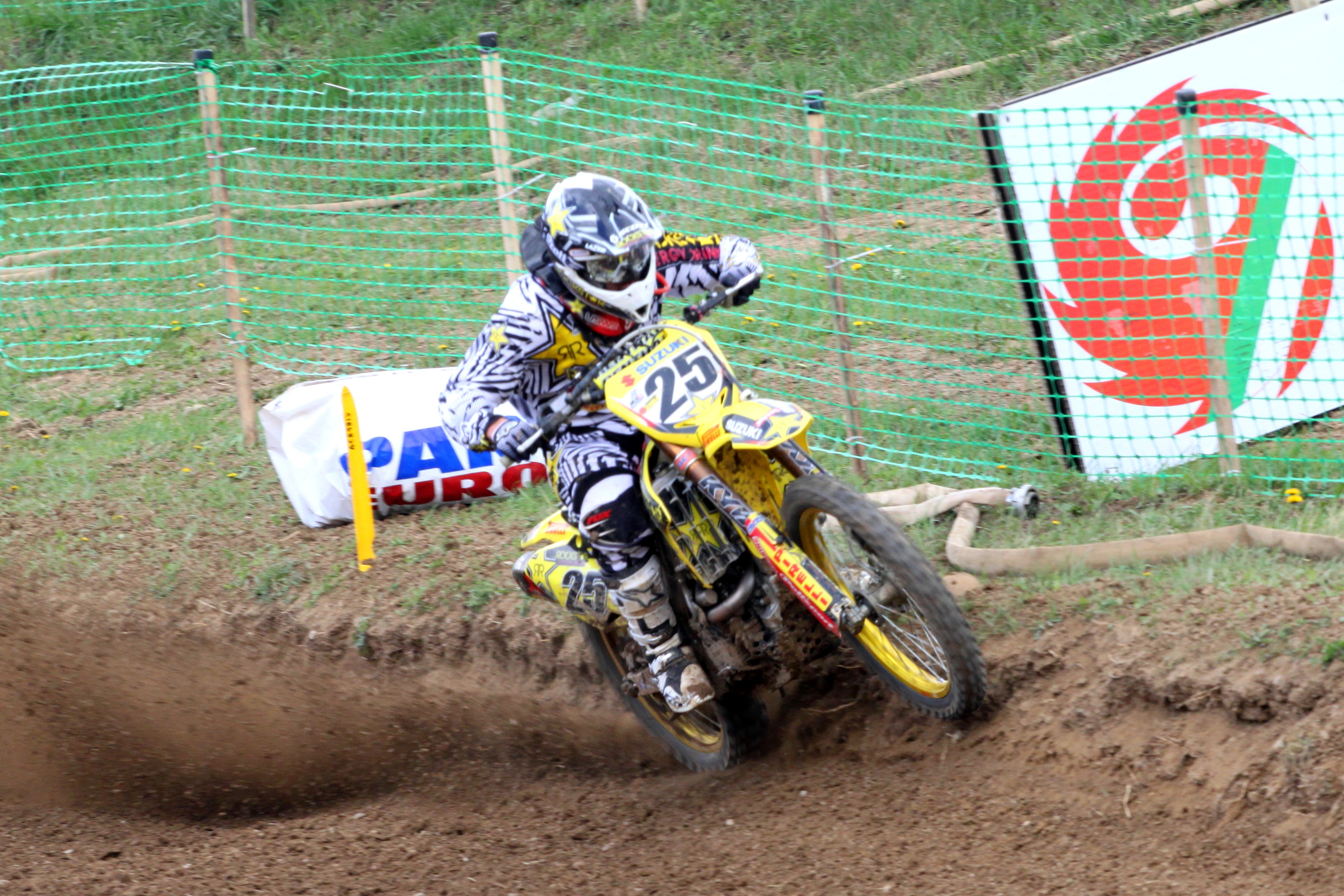
- Desalle in 2011
- Nationality: (Belgium) Belgian
- Born: 19 May 1989 (age 37) La Louvière, Belgium

Motocross career
- Years active: 2006–2020
- Teams: Honda, Suzuki, Kawasaki
- Grands Prix: •MXGP: 218
- Wins: •MXGP: 23
- GP debut: 2006, GP of Flanders, Zolder, MX1
- First GP win: Loket 9 August 2009 (Czech Republic)

Clément Desalle (born 19 May 1989) is a Belgian former professional motocross racer. He competed in the Motocross World Championships from 2006 to 2020. Desalle raced in the MXGP class his entire motocross career, finishing both second & third thrice.

== Motocross career ==
Born in La Louvière, Belgium, Desalle began competing in the premier MXGP class as soon as he became a professional racer in 2006. In his fourth season of competition, he won his first Grand Prix race in the Czech Republic and placed third in the 2009 FIM Motocross World Championship season riding for the LS Motors-Honda team. Between 2010 and 2013, he would rank either second or third in the motocross world championships while riding for the Teka-Suzuki team run by Sylvain Geboers with former motocross world champion Eric Geboers as the team manager. Desalle was also a member of the victorious Belgian 2013 Motocross des Nations team that included Ken De Dycker and Jeremy Van Horebeek.

Desalle joined the Kawasaki factory racing team in 2016. Desalle announced his retirement in 2020 after 15 seasons.

== GP wins ==
- Loket (Czech Republic) 9 August 2009
- Canelinha (Brazil) 13 September 2009
- Agueda (Portugal) 9 May 2010
- Kegums (Latvia) 27 June 2010
- Fermo (Italy) 12 September 2010
- Sevlievo (Bulgaria) 10 April 2011
- Glen Helen (USA) 15 May 2011
- Agueda (Portugal) 12 June 2011
- Loket (Czech Republic) 7 August 2011
- Agueda (Portugal) 10 June 2012
- Uddevalla (Sweden) 1 July 2012
- Losail (Qatar) 2 March 2013
- Loket (Czech Republic) 4 August 2013
- Bastogne (Belgium) 18 August 2013
- Matterley Basin (Great Britain) 25 August 2013
- Arco di Trento (Trentino) 13 April 2014
- Talavera de la Reina (Spain) 11 May 2014
- St. Jean d'Angely (France) 1 June 2014
- Teutschenthal (Germany) 22 June 2014
- Assen (Netherlands) 28 August 2016
- Ernée (France) 28 May 2017
- Orlyonok (Russia) 11 June 2017
- Orlyonok (Russia) 1 May 2018

== MXGP Results ==
Year	Rnd 1	Rnd 2	Rnd 3	Rnd 4	Rnd 5	Rnd 6	Rnd 7	Rnd 8	Rnd 9	Rnd 10	Rnd 11	Rnd 12	Rnd 13	Rnd 14	Rnd 15	Rnd 16	Rnd 17	Rnd 18	Rnd 19	Rnd 20	Average Finish	Podium Percent	Place
2009 MX1	3	10	8	8	3	5	3	5	6	2	5	5	1	3	1	-	-	-	-	-	4.53	47%	3rd
2010 MX1	3	2	OUT	1	5	3	3	2	1	2	3	2	9	9	1	-	-	-	-	-	3.28	79%	2nd
2011 MX1	1	6	1	3	3	1	4	7	3	9	2	1	OUT	OUT	OUT	-	-	-	-	-	3.41	67%	3rd
2012 MX1	2	8	3	2	7	4	1	2	1	6	2	3	6	6	3	3	-	-	-	-	3.68	63%	2nd
2013 MX1	1	3	7	4	3	3	2	3	10	3	3	2	2	1	1	1	9	-	-	-	3.41	76%	2nd
2014 MXGP	7	2	2	1	4	4	1	2	1	4	1	11	OUT	OUT	OUT	OUT	-	-	-	-	3.33	58%	4th

== Season results ==
2003: 9th 125cc French cadet class

2004: 9th 125cc French Junior class

2005: 5th 125cc Junior world championship
9th 125cc European championship

2006: 25th MX1 world championship
8th MX1 German championship

2007: 20th MX1 world championship
5th MX1 German championship

2008: 11th MX1 world championship
2nd MX1 German championship

2009: 3rd MX1 world championship
Pro open Belgian champion

2010: 2nd MX1 world championship

2011: 3rd MX1 world championship (missed three rounds due to injury)

2012: 2nd MX1 world championship

2013: 2nd MX1 world championship

2014: 4th MXGP world championship

2015: 10th MXGP world championship

2016: 8th MXGP world championship

2017: 4th MXGP world championship

2018: 3rd MXGP world championship

2019: 14th MXGP world championship (missed 11 rounds due to injury)
