= Kevin Strijbos =

Belgian motorcycle racer

- Nationality: Belgian
- Born: 13 August 1985 (age 41) Geel, Belgium

Motocross career
- Years active: 2000–2021
- Teams: Suzuki
- Championships: 85cc – 1999 EMX 125cc – 2001
- Wins: 6
- GP debut: 2000, GP of Finland, 125cc

Kevin Strijbos (born 13 August 1985 in Geel) is a Belgian former professional motocross racer. He competed in the Motocross World Championships from 2000 until 2021.

Strijbos was the 1999 85cc motocross world champion and, in 2001 he won the 125cc European motocross championship. In 2006, Strijbos finished second in the world championship behind Stefan Everts. He finished second again in 2007, this time behind Steve Ramon. He was a member of the winning Belgium team at the 2004 Motocross des Nations event that included Ramon and Stefan Everts.

Strijbos ended his professional racing career on 10 November 2021 at the GP of Mantua in Italy.
