= Shaun Simpson (motorcyclist) =

British motorcycle racer

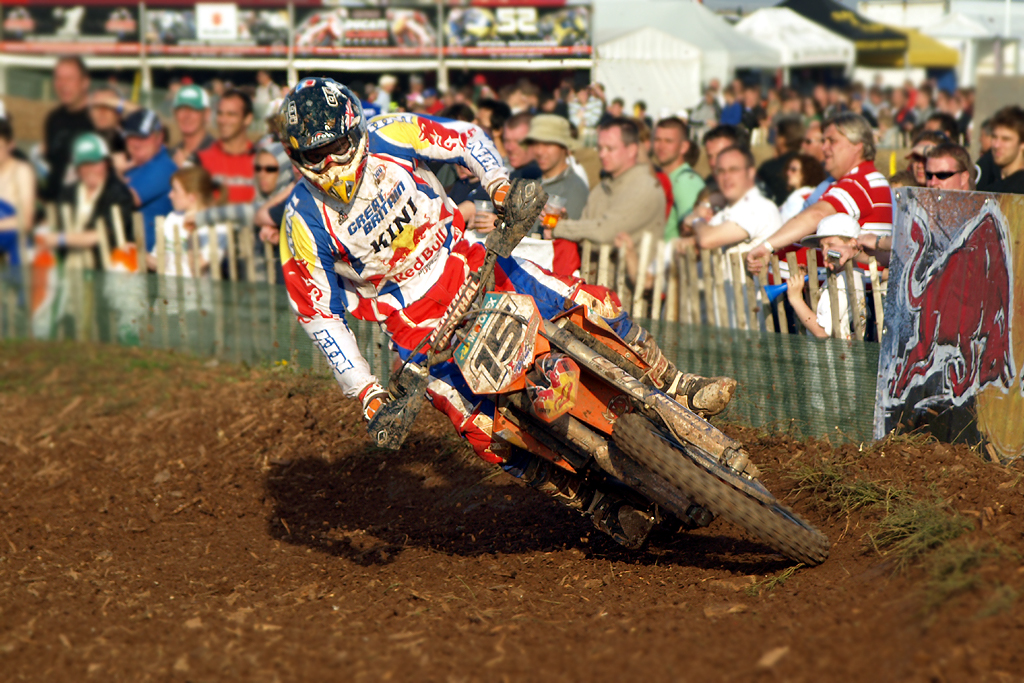
- Nationality: British
- Born: 13 March 1988 (age 38) Gauldry, Fife, Scotland

Motocross career
- Years active: 2004 - 2021
- Teams: KTM, Honda, Yamaha, TM, Kawasaki
- Wins: 4
- GP debut: 2004 British Grand Prix, Isle of Wight, MX2

Shaun Simpson (born 13 March 1988) is a Scottish former professional motocross racer. He competed in the Motocross World Championships from 2004 to 2021. Simpson has won two British Motocross Championships (2008 and 2014), a Belgian Championship (2011) and has represented Great Britain four times at the prestigious Motocross des Nations.

== Motocross career ==
Simpson was born in Gauldry, Fife, Scotland and educated at Madras College secondary school. In 2010, Simpson competed for the KTM factory racing team managed by former world champion Stefan Everts in the F.I.M. MX2-GP World Championships. He finished in eighth place with three podium finishes. For 2011 he signed a contract to race for the Honda LS team and finished the season in 15th place. He raced in the 2013 season with Factory TM Ricci Racing using the number 24 jersey. Simpson announced his separation from TM Racing on 24 June 2013. He placed seventh in the 2014 MXGP world championship and, improved to a fourth-place finish in the 2015 season with three moto victories while riding for the HM Plant KTM UK team.
