= Ben Watson (motocross racer) =

British motorcycle racer

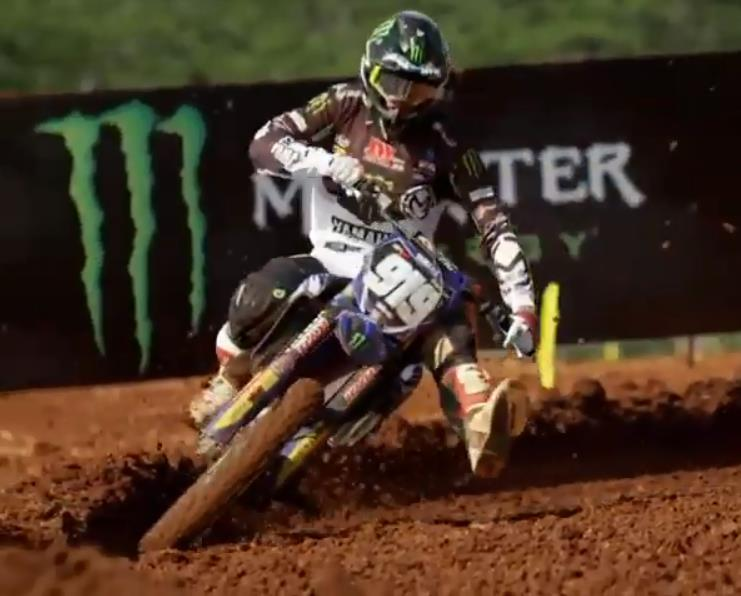
- Ben Watson in 2019.
- Nationality: British
- Born: 5 June 1997 (age 29) Nottinghamshire, United Kingdom

Motocross career
- Years active: 2014-present
- Teams: •Monster Energy Yamaha Factory MXGP (2018-2021); •Kawasaki Racing Team MXGP (2022); •MRT Racing Team Beta (2023-2025); •Dirt Store Triumph Racing (2026-Present)
- Championships: 2017 MX2 British Motocross Championship
- Wins: •MX2: 2
- GP debut: 2014, GP of Netherlands, MX2
- First GP win: 2020, GP of Lommel, MX2

Ben Watson (born 5 June 1997) is a British professional motocross rider. He has competed in the British Motocross Championship and the Motocross World Championships since 2014.

== MXGP Results ==
Year	Rnd 1	Rnd 2	Rnd 3	Rnd 4	Rnd 5	Rnd 6	Rnd 7	Rnd 8	Rnd 9	Rnd 10	Rnd 11	Rnd 12	Rnd 13	Rnd 14	Rnd 15	Rnd 16	Rnd 17	Rnd 18	Rnd 19	Rnd 20	Average Finish	Podium Percent	Place
2026 MXGP	OUT ARG (Argentina)	13 AND (Andalusia)	24 SUI (Switzerland)	15 SAR (Sardinia)	23 TRE	18 FRA (France)	24 GER (Germany)	14 LAT (Latvia)	OUT ITA (Italy)	14 POR (Portugal)	OUT RSA (South Africa)	13 GBR (United Kingdom)	12 CZE (Czech Republic)	7 FLA (Flanders)	19 SWE (Sweden)	14 NED (Netherlands)	OUT TUR (Turkey)	OUT CHN (China)	OUT AUS (Australia)	-	15.00	-	18th
