= Ben Townley =

New Zealand motorcycle racer

- Townley in 2007
- Nationality: New Zealand
- Born: 12 December 1984 (age 41) Taupō, New Zealand

Motocross career
- Years active: 2001 - 2013, 2015, 2017
- Teams: Kawasaki, KTM, Honda, Suzuki
- Championships: 2004 MX2; 2007 AMA Supercross 250cc East
- Wins: MX2: 8; MXGP: 4

Ben Townley (born 12 December 1984) is a former professional motocross and supercross racer originating from Taupō, New Zealand. He competed in the Motocross World Championships from 2001 to 2005 and in the AMA Motocross Championships from 2006 to 2013. Townley is notable for winning the 2004 MX2 world championship.

== Biography ==
After claiming multiple National championships in his native New Zealand, Townley moved to Europe and began campaigning the FIM MX2-GP World Championships. He rode for the German PHASE Suzuki team in 2001, but after internal troubles, left the team towards the end of the season and joined the Vangani Racing team. In 2002, this team became known as the "Dream Team" as Townley and teammates Tyla Rattray and Tanel Leok, all still teenagers, scorched to top 10 results in GP after GP. Townley started the 2002 off with a second place at the GP of Valkenswaard, and after a few more podium finishes, he scored his first GP victory at the GP of Sweden at Uddevalla. He continued his good form at the Champ KTM team in 2003, and made his mark as a definite world championship contender.

Monster Energy Pro Circuit Kawasaki rider Ben Townley prepares before the 2007 Washougal motocross national.

In 2004, riding the prototype KTM 250-SXF four stroke, Townley won the MX2 World Championship over teammates future champ Antonio Cairoli and teammates Tyla Rattray and Marc DeReuver. Townley had reached a new level of speed and endurance, winning nearly every race when his prototype machine did not fail.

2005 saw Townley move up to the MX1-GP class aboard a 450cc KTM. Townley won several GPs in the premier division in that rookie season, and was a consistent threat for the win by the end of the year. He finished third behind champion Stefan Everts and fellow New Zealander Josh Coppins.

Townley and Coppins represented their country at the 2005 Motocross des Nations in Ernée, France. It was there that Townley first faced the premier American riders who typically contend only their National championships. Townley was superb, running faster than Kevin Windham, Mickael Pichon and Stefan Everts, and was only defeated by American champion Ricky Carmichael, who is widely considered the fastest rider in the world.

After that, Townley moved to the United States and settled near Carmichael's home in Tallahassee, Florida. He was a member of the Monster Energy/Pro Circuit team and raced a Kawasaki KX250F in the Motocross/Supercross Lites class. In 2006, Townley suffered a severe knee injury while preparing for the Supercross Lites East championship and subsequently sat out the majority of the 2006 season.

Townley returned to the Supercross championship in 2007 and won the 2007 Supercross Lites East championship over rookie Ryan Dungey and Ryan Morias. He and teammate Ryan Villopoto kept the points race close during the 2007 Motocross series with Townley finishing a close second to his teammate.

In 2008, Townley signed with Team Honda Red Bull Racing to contest the 2008 Supercross/Motocross season riding the Honda CR250F for the Supercross series and the CR450F for the Motocross series. Due to breaking his foot while training for the 2008 Monster Energy AMA East Coast Supercross Lites series, Townley was not able to compete. Because of this, Benjamin Coisey from France, took his spot for the East Coast Lites series racing for Red Bull Honda.

Townley has since earned a reputation as a rider who is prone to injury and eventually announced his retirement from professional motocross competition in early 2013. However, in 2015, he agreed to come out of retirement to represent New Zealand in the 2015 Motocross des Nations in Ernée, France where he finished 6th and 2nd in his respective races.

In 2018, Townley again came out of retirement to race the SX Open at Mount Smart Stadium in Auckland. He did the practice session and raced the ANZAC Vs Abroad race but never raced The heats or main event.

== Career results ==
Year	Rnd 1	Rnd 2	Rnd 3	Rnd 4	Rnd 5	Rnd 6	Rnd 7	Rnd 8	Rnd 9	Rnd 10	Rnd 11	Rnd 12	Rnd 13	Rnd 14	Rnd 15	Rnd 16	Rnd 17	Average Finish	Podium Percent	Place
2004 MX2	6	1	1	8	1	1	7	5	7	1	1	5	5	1	1	-	-	3.40	53%	1st
2005 MX1	4	1	21	3	8	10	3	1	1	2	10	9	4	6	1	3	2	5.23	53%	3rd
2007 SX-E	-	-	-	-	-	-	-	22	1	1	7	2	1	2	-	22	-	7.25	63%	1st
2007 250 MX	1	3	1	2	2	1	1	1	2	2	3	1	-	-	-	-	-	1.66	100%	2nd
