= 2024 ADAC MX Masters =

German Motocross Competition in 2024

The 2024 ADAC MX Masters season was the 20th ADAC MX Masters season.

The series had eight rounds across Germany, running from April to September. Max Nagl was the reigning champion in the premier MX Masters category, after he took his fourth title in 2023. Nagl was able to successfully defend his title, becoming champion for the fifth time in his long career.

In the second tier Youngster Cup class, Spanish rider Oriol Oliver was the reigning champion. However he will not defend his title due to moving up to compete in the MX Masters class. Swiss rider Nico Greutmann won the title, which was his first title within the ADAC MX Masters series.

== Race calendar and results ==
The full calendar was released on 11 December 2023.

=== MX Masters ===
| Round | Date | Location | Race 1 Winner | Race 2 Winner | Race 3 Winner | Round Winner |
|---|---|---|---|---|---|---|
| 1 | 20–21 April | (Brandenburg) Fürstlich Drehna | (Germany) Max Nagl | (United Kingdom) Adam Sterry | (Germany) Max Nagl | (Germany) Max Nagl |
| 2 | 27–28 April | (Brandenburg) Dreetz | (Germany) Max Nagl | (Germany) Max Nagl | (Germany) Max Nagl | (Germany) Max Nagl |
| 3 | 25–26 May | (Mecklenburg-Vorpommern) Vellahn | (Germany) Max Nagl | (Germany) Max Nagl | (Germany) Max Nagl | (Germany) Max Nagl |
| 4 | 22–23 June | (North Rhine-Westphalia) Bielstein | (Germany) Max Nagl | (Germany) Max Nagl | (Germany) Max Nagl | (Germany) Max Nagl |
| 5 | 13–14 July | (Schleswig-Holstein) Tensfeld | (Netherlands) Jeffrey Herlings | (Netherlands) Jeffrey Herlings | (Netherlands) Jeffrey Herlings | (Netherlands) Jeffrey Herlings |
| 6 | 3–4 August | (Baden-Württemberg) Gaildorf | (France) Jordi Tixier | (Austria) Marcel Stauffer | (Germany) Tom Koch | (Germany) Tom Koch |
| 7 | 31 August-1 September | (Saxony) Jauer (Panschwitz-Kuckau) | (Germany) Henry Jacobi | (Norway) Cornelius Tøndel | (Norway) Cornelius Tøndel | (Norway) Cornelius Tøndel |
| 8 | 21–22 September | (Baden-Württemberg) Holzgerlingen | (France) Jordi Tixier | (Germany) Max Nagl | (Germany) Max Nagl | (Germany) Max Nagl |

=== Youngster Cup ===
| Round | Date | Location | Race 1 Winner | Race 2 Winner | Race 3 Winner | Round Winner |
|---|---|---|---|---|---|---|
| 1 | 20–21 April | (Brandenburg) Fürstlich Drehna | (Denmark) Nicolai Skovbjerg | (Latvia) Edvards Bidzāns | (Denmark) Rasmus Pedersen | (Latvia) Edvards Bidzāns |
| 2 | 27–28 April | (Brandenburg) Dreetz | (Netherlands) Dave Kooiker | (Netherlands) Dave Kooiker | (Netherlands) Dave Kooiker | (Netherlands) Dave Kooiker |
| 3 | 25–26 May | (Mecklenburg-Vorpommern) Vellahn | (France) Maxime Grau | (Netherlands) Dave Kooiker | (Switzerland) Nico Greutmann | (Netherlands) Dave Kooiker |
| 4 | 22–23 June | (North Rhine-Westphalia) Bielstein | (France) Maxime Grau | (France) Maxime Grau | (France) Maxime Grau | (France) Maxime Grau |
| 5 | 13–14 July | (Schleswig-Holstein) Tensfeld | (Switzerland) Nico Greutmann | (Switzerland) Nico Greutmann | (France) Maxime Grau | (Switzerland) Nico Greutmann |
| 6 | 3–4 August | (Baden-Württemberg) Gaildorf | (Switzerland) Nico Greutmann | (Switzerland) Nico Greutmann | (Switzerland) Nico Greutmann | (Switzerland) Nico Greutmann |
| 7 | 31 August-1 September | (Saxony) Jauer (Panschwitz-Kuckau) | (Hungary) Bence Pergel | (Hungary) Bence Pergel | (Switzerland) Nico Greutmann | (Hungary) Bence Pergel |
| 8 | 21–22 September | (Baden-Württemberg) Holzgerlingen | (Switzerland) Nico Greutmann | (Switzerland) Nico Greutmann | (Australia) Ryan Alexanderson | (Switzerland) Nico Greutmann |

=== Circuit locations ===
2024 ADAC MX Masters locations

== MX Masters ==
=== Participants ===
| Team | Constructor | No | Rider | Rounds |
|---|---|---|---|---|
| JM Honda Racing | Honda | 2 | (Belgium) Brent Van Doninck | 5 |
| Sturm | Yamaha | 4 | (France) Bogdan Krajewski | 5 |
| GripMesser Racing Team | KTM | 5 | (Czech Republic) Adam Dušek | 1–4, 6–7 |
| GripMesser Racing Team | Gas Gas | 96 | (Spain) Victor Alonso | 5 |
| GripMesser Racing Team | Kawasaki | 221 | (Denmark) Mathias Jørgensen | 7 |
| | Yamaha | 6 | (Netherlands) Lars Looman | 2–4 |
| KTM Kosak Racing Team | KTM | 7 | (Germany) Maximilian Spies | All |
| KTM Kosak Racing Team | KTM | 39 | (Netherlands) Roan van de Moosdijk | 5–8 |
| KTM Kosak Racing Team | KTM | 226 | (Germany) Tom Koch | All |
| KMP Honda Racing Team powered by Krettek | Honda | 12 | (Germany) Max Nagl | All |
| KMP Honda Racing Team powered by Krettek | Honda | 145 | (Germany) Pascal Jungmann | 1–3, 8 |
| KMP Honda Racing Team powered by Krettek | Honda | 231 | (Germany) Nico Meintel | 6, 8 |
| KMP Honda Racing Team powered by Krettek | Honda | 911 | (France) Jordi Tixier | All |
| KMP Honda Racing Team powered by Krettek | Honda | 931 | (Germany) Marco Fleissig | 6–8 |
| AMX Racing | KTM | 20 | (Denmark) Victor Kleemann | All |
| AMX Racing | Husqvarna | 251 | (Belgium) Jens Getteman | 1, 3–4, 8 |
| AMX Racing | Gas Gas | 418 | (Netherlands) Jeremy de Jong | 1, 3–5 |
| AMX Racing | KTM | 817 | (Netherlands) Raf Meuwissen | 1–6 |
| | KTM | 21 | (Germany) Kevin Keim | 6, 8 |
| VisuAlz Production | Husqvarna | 25 | (Germany) Marvin Koch | 4–6, 8 |
| VisuAlz Production | Husqvarna | 66 | (Germany) Tim Koch | 1–2, 4–8 |
| VisuAlz Production | Kawasaki | 891 | (Germany) Paul Ullrich | 2–5, 7 |
| B&B Mallon Racing | Gas Gas | 26 | (Germany) Mike Stender | 1, 4, 8 |
| B&B Mallon Racing | Honda | 410 | (Germany) Max Thunecke | All |
| B&B Mallon Racing | Gas Gas | 551 | (Germany) Benjamin Mallon | 3 |
| Motorsport-Burmeister Schwerin | Yamaha | 27 | (Germany) Ole Schmidt | 3 |
| Husqvarna SKS Racing | Husqvarna | 28 | (Netherlands) Jorn Weeren | 3–5, 7–8 |
| KTM Sarholz Racing Team | KTM | 29 | (Germany) Henry Jacobi | 1–3, 6–8 |
| KTM Sarholz Racing Team | KTM | 149 | (Germany) Dennis Ullrich | All |
| KTM Sarholz Racing Team | KTM | 238 | (Germany) Lukas Platt | All |
| KTM Sarholz Racing Team | KTM | 300 | (Germany) Noah Ludwig | All |
| Cat Moto Bauerschmidt Husqvarna | Husqvarna | 31 | (Switzerland) Loris Freidig | 1–4, 6, 8 |
| Cat Moto Bauerschmidt Husqvarna | Husqvarna | 131 | (Germany) Cato Nickel | 1–3, 5–8 |
| Behnke Motorsport | Gas Gas | 32 | (Germany) Dino Skoppek | 3 |
| Team UM933 | Honda | 33 | (Belgium) Ugo Moors | 1 |
| BvZ Racing Team | KTM | 34 | (Germany) Toni Hoffmann | 1–7 |
| JT Construction Motoextreme Honda | Honda | 37 | (Estonia) Gert Krestinov | 1–2 |
| OneForOne Production powered by EHS Racing | KTM | 41 | (Germany) Henry Schönburg | 6, 8 |
| OneForOne Production powered by EHS Racing | Gas Gas | 65 | (Switzerland) Robin Scheiben | 4, 6, 8 |
| OneForOne Production powered by EHS Racing | KTM | 338 | (Germany) Eric Schönburg | 4, 6, 8 |
| Twenty Racing Team | Gas Gas | 44 | (Netherlands) Jeremy Knuiman | 1–7 |
| Osička MX Team | KTM | 45 | (Slovakia) Tomáš Kohút | 6–8 |
| Osička MX Team | KTM | 401 | (Austria) Marcel Stauffer | 6, 8 |
| WZ Racing KTM | KTM | 51 | (Spain) Oriol Oliver | 1–2 |
| Luke's Racing - Hertrampf Gruppe | Husqvarna | 52 | (Sweden) Albin Gerhardsson | 5 |
| stielergruppe.mx Johannes-Bikes Suzuki | Suzuki | 53 | (Slovakia) Šimon Jošt | 1–2, 4 |
| stielergruppe.mx Johannes-Bikes Suzuki | Suzuki | 92 | (Denmark) Glen Meier | 1 |
| stielergruppe.mx Johannes-Bikes Suzuki | Suzuki | 111 | (Germany) Max Benthin | 2 |
| stielergruppe.mx Johannes-Bikes Suzuki | Suzuki | 173 | (Denmark) Jakob Nielsen | 5–6 |
| stielergruppe.mx Johannes-Bikes Suzuki | Suzuki | 727 | (France) Boris Maillard | All |
| Kosak Racing Team/MSC Gaildorf | KTM | 54 | (Germany) Kevin Winkle | 6, 8 |
| TYK - Team Yamaha Knobloch | Yamaha | 58 | (Germany) Gerrit Heistermann | 1–2, 4–5, 7–8 |
| | Fantic | 61 | (Germany) Markus Barth | 6, 8 |
| | Yamaha | 71 | (Netherlands) Domien Vermeiren | 4 |
| MTX Racing Team | Yamaha | 74 | (Czech Republic) Pavel Dvořáček | 1–2, 7 |
| Enduro Koch Racing | Husqvarna | 77 | (Germany) Leonard Koch | 4, 6, 8 |
| Enduro Koch Racing | Husqvarna | 224 | (Czech Republic) Jakub Terešák | All |
| Enduro Koch Racing | Husqvarna | 299 | (Germany) Sascha Ströbele | 4, 6, 8 |
| Werthmann Racing Team by Mefo Sport | KTM | 80 | (Austria) Markus Rammel | 2–3, 5–6 |
| Werthmann Racing Team by Mefo Sport | KTM | 137 | (Czech Republic) Rudolf Weschta | 1 |
| Werthmann Racing Team by Mefo Sport | KTM | 309 | (Germany) Christian Forderer | 6–7 |
| Werthmann Racing Team by Mefo Sport | KTM | 377 | (Czech Republic) Martin Krč | 1, 3–4, 6 |
| Red Bull KTM Factory Racing | KTM | 84 | (Netherlands) Jeffrey Herlings | 5 |
| SixtySeven Racing Husqvarna | Husqvarna | 87 | (Switzerland) Kevin Brumann | 1, 3–8 |
| SixtySeven Racing Husqvarna | Husqvarna | 973 | (Germany) Philipp Klakow | 8 |
| SixtySeven Racing Husqvarna | Husqvarna | 991 | (Germany) Mark Scheu | All |
| Sturm STC Racing | Yamaha | 90 | (Germany) Justin Trache | 1–3 |
| Sturm STC Racing | KTM | 276 | (Spain) Joan David Rosell | 6 |
| De Nardo Yamaha Racing | Yamaha | 94 | (Switzerland) Nico Häusermann | 6 |
| Becker Racing | KTM | 101 | (Czech Republic) Václav Kovář | 1–3, 5–8 |
| Becker Racing | Gas Gas | 278 | (Belgium) Thomas Vermijl | All |
| Becker Racing | Gas Gas | 440 | (Germany) Marnique Appelt | All |
| Becker Racing | Gas Gas | 260 | (Germany) Nico Koch | All |
| MX For Live - Stara Gwardia | KTM | 107 | (Poland) Jakub Barczewski | 1–3 |
| Schmicker Racing | KTM | 117 | (Norway) Cornelius Tøndel | 1–5, 7–8 |
| Schmicker Racing | KTM | 125 | (Finland) Emil Weckman | 7–8 |
| Schmicker Racing | KTM | 142 | (Finland) Jere Haavisto | All |
| Schmicker Racing | KTM | 811 | (United Kingdom) Adam Sterry | 1–7 |
| Mňuk Racing Team | Yamaha | 121 | (Czech Republic) Roman Mňuk | 1 |
| Enduro Koch Racing by Winkler Suspension | Husqvarna | 123 | (Germany) Tim Kühner | 6, 8 |
| Wiese Motorsport | Gas Gas | 126 | (Germany) Florian Wiese | 5 |
| | Yamaha | 128 | (Germany) Fabian Ströbele | 6, 8 |
| | KTM | 130 | (Czech Republic) Radim Kraus | 6–7 |
| Rynopower powered by Kaczmarek Motorsport | KTM | 136 | (Germany) Luca Harms | 3–4, 6–7 |
| MX-Handel Racing | Husqvarna | 140 | (Estonia) Tanel Leok | 8 |
| MX-Handel Racing | Husqvarna | 151 | (Estonia) Harri Kullas | 1 |
| MX-Handel Racing | Husqvarna | 297 | (Sweden) Anton Gole | 4 |
| MX-Handel Racing | Husqvarna | 733 | (Estonia) Kaarel Tilk | 1–7 |
| Kawasaki Elf Team Pfeil | Kawasaki | 159 | (Germany) Tobias Linke | 1–3, 5 |
| HM Racing | Husqvarna | 171 | (Germany) Fynn-Niklas Tornau | 1–2 |
| Pro MX Team | Yamaha | 177 | (Germany) Jakob Kurjat | 7 |
| MMX Racing Team Luxemburg | Honda | 192 | (Belgium) Björn Feyen | 4 |
| 3Brothers Hatch Racing Gas Gas | Gas Gas | 218 | (Italy) Giacomo Redondi | 6 |
| HPM Racing | Gas Gas | 227 | (Germany) Vincent Gallwitz | 3–5, 7 |
| HPM Racing | Gas Gas | 741 | (Germany) Jonas Oerter | 4 |
| Team Motorrad Waldmann | Honda | 234 | (Germany) Stefan Frank | 6, 8 |
| Team Motorrad Waldmann | Honda | 491 | (Germany) Paul Haberland | 6–8 |
| | Honda | 239 | (Netherlands) Menno Aussems | 5 |
| A-Team Neustrelitz | KTM | 244 | (Germany) Max Bülow | All |
| MC Kundl | Honda | 245 | (Austria) Mario Pichler | 6 |
| Lexa MX | Husqvarna | 249 | (United Kingdom) John Adamson | All |
| Lexa MX | Husqvarna | 285 | (United Kingdom) Calum Mitchell | 1–2 |
| Haas Racing Team | Husqvarna | 280 | (Czech Republic) Martin Vondrášek | 7 |
| | KTM | 310 | (Germany) Marvin Dietermann | 4 |
| SHR Motorsports by Hartje | Yamaha | 313 | (Czech Republic) Petr Polák | All |
| SHR Motorsports by Hartje | Yamaha | 491 | (Germany) Paul Haberland | 1–3 |
| SHR Motorsports by Hartje | Yamaha | 822 | (Netherlands) Mike Bolink | 1–7 |
| Zweiradsport Schmitz Yamaha | Yamaha | 315 | (Germany) Gianluca Ecca | 5 |
| Orion Racing Team | KTM | 322 | (Slovakia) Pavol Repčák | All |
| Motorrad Waldmmann/MSC Gaildorf | Yamaha | 328 | (Germany) Theo Praun | 1, 4, 6–7 |
| KTM Sarholz Racing Team/One8Seven Racing Team | KTM | 380 | (Germany) Phil Niklas Löb | 4, 6 |
| Nilssons MC | Gas Gas | 397 | (Sweden) Axel Nilsson | 5 |
| | Fantic | 430 | (Denmark) Sam Korneliussen | 5 |
| | Yamaha | 500 | (Germany) Janik Schröter | 3 |
| MX-Vogelwaid | KTM | 530 | (Germany) John Vogelwaid | 4, 6–8 |
| MX Moduls | Husqvarna | 610 | (Latvia) Mairis Pumpurs | 8 |
| MXMagmum | Gas Gas | 637 | (Latvia) Tomass Šileika | 1–3 |
| | KTM | 651 | (Estonia) Meico Vettik | 5 |
| KDH Motorsport powered by Fantic Motor | Fantic | 716 | (Germany) Leon Rehberg | 1–2 |
| Mefo Sport Racing Team by Alskom | KTM | 726 | (Germany) Moritz Schittenhelm | 6, 8 |
| Bloody Harry Energy - RGS MX Team | Yamaha | 750 | (Sweden) Samuel Flink | 1–7 |
| Bloody Harry Energy - RGS MX Team | KTM | 777 | (Germany) Eric Schwella | 1, 7 |
| Sahkar Racing | KTM | 751 | (Estonia) Hardi Roosiorg | 1, 5 |
| HTS KTM | KTM | 766 | (Austria) Michael Sandner | 6 |
| Motoshop 81 SK | KTM | 814 | (Slovakia) Matúš Tomala | 4 |
| MX For Live - Stara Gwardia | Husqvarna | 841 | (Poland) Jakub Kowalski | 3, 6 |
| | Kawasaki | 843 | (Netherlands) Daniël Wendels | 1 |
| HM Racing Honda Falkensee | Honda | 859 | (Germany) Vincent Peter | 1 |
| Hegau Racing Team | Yamaha | 898 | (Germany) Elias Stapel | 4, 6, 8 |
| Hegau Racing Team | Fantic | 881 | (Germany) Cedric Schick | 6–7 |
| Rask's Svets & Smide AB | Yamaha | 899 | (Sweden) Fredrik Rask | 1 |
| | Husqvarna | 900 | (Denmark) Christian Skøtt | 1 |
| Motorrad Meyer Racing | Yamaha | 915 | (Germany) Malik Schoch | 6, 8 |
| DCN-Laurense Motors-Kawasaki | Kawasaki | 940 | (Netherlands) Sven van der Mierden | 5 |
| FMP Racing | KTM | 992 | (Germany) Marvin Pfeffer | 1, 6 |
| | Kawasaki | 994 | (Austria) Marco Heidegger | 6, 8 |

=== Riders Championship ===
| Pos | Rider | Bike | FÜR (Brandenburg) | | | DRE (Brandenburg) | | | VEL (Mecklenburg-Vorpommern) | | | BIE (North Rhine-Westphalia) | | | TEN (Schleswig-Holstein) | | | GAI (Baden-Württemberg) | | | JAU (Saxony) | | | HOL (Baden-Württemberg) | | | Points |
|---|---|---|---|---|---|---|---|---|---|---|---|---|---|---|---|---|---|---|---|---|---|---|---|---|---|---|---|
| 1 | (Germany) Max Nagl | Honda | 1 | 5 | 1 | 1 | 1 | 1 | 1 | 1 | 1 | 1 | 1 | 1 | 10 | 2 | 2 | 5 | 4 | 5 | 2 | 2 | 3 | 4 | 1 | 1 | 528 |
| 2 | (Germany) Tom Koch | KTM | 6 | 4 | 6 | 6 | 12 | 8 | 7 | 3 | 3 | Ret | 8 | 9 | 2 | 6 | 5 | 2 | 3 | 1 | 6 | 10 | 2 | 2 | 3 | 7 | 388 |
| 3 | (France) Jordi Tixier | Honda | DNS | 6 | 7 | 3 | 4 | 5 | 3 | 4 | 7 | 2 | 7 | 2 | 7 | DNS | DNS | 1 | 2 | 4 | 4 | 4 | 9 | 1 | 2 | 8 | 380 |
| 4 | (Germany) Maximilian Spies | KTM | 4 | 3 | 3 | 2 | 2 | 4 | 4 | 7 | 6 | 8 | 10 | 12 | 4 | 3 | Ret | 8 | 5 | 10 | 11 | 5 | 4 | 6 | 10 | 6 | 363 |
| 5 | (United Kingdom) Adam Sterry | KTM | 5 | 1 | 4 | 13 | 3 | 6 | 6 | 6 | 8 | 4 | 2 | 5 | 8 | 14 | 7 | 4 | 10 | 15 | 12 | 7 | 10 | | | | 304 |
| 6 | (Norway) Cornelius Tøndel | KTM | 2 | Ret | 8 | 5 | 7 | 3 | 2 | 2 | 2 | 15 | 4 | 14 | 6 | 9 | 11 | | | | 3 | 1 | 1 | Ret | DNS | DNS | 289 |
| 7 | (Czech Republic) Jakub Terešák | Husqvarna | 8 | 16 | 9 | 12 | 10 | 18 | 15 | 8 | 12 | 3 | 9 | 6 | 11 | 15 | 9 | 13 | 12 | 3 | 5 | 3 | 7 | 14 | 9 | 13 | 270 |
| 8 | (Finland) Jere Haavisto | KTM | 9 | 2 | 5 | 4 | 8 | 17 | 12 | 18 | 5 | 10 | 3 | 4 | 9 | 5 | 4 | 9 | 19 | 28 | 7 | 23 | 8 | 13 | Ret | DNS | 257 |
| 9 | (Germany) Henry Jacobi | KTM | 3 | Ret | 10 | 8 | 5 | 9 | 5 | 5 | 4 | | | | | | | 6 | 8 | Ret | 1 | 9 | 5 | Ret | 7 | 16 | 222 |
| 10 | (Germany) Noah Ludwig | KTM | 7 | 7 | 11 | 7 | 6 | 10 | 17 | 9 | 16 | 5 | 13 | 20 | 33 | 19 | 13 | 3 | 6 | 7 | Ret | DNS | DNS | 26 | 4 | 4 | 219 |
| 11 | (Germany) Dennis Ullrich | KTM | 28 | Ret | Ret | 14 | Ret | 11 | 20 | 12 | DNS | 11 | 5 | 3 | 18 | 8 | 18 | 20 | 7 | 6 | 18 | 16 | 14 | 5 | 12 | 2 | 184 |
| 12 | (Germany) Lukas Platt | KTM | 14 | 8 | 16 | 16 | 17 | 23 | 9 | 11 | 11 | 7 | 6 | 11 | 12 | 7 | 8 | 15 | 26 | 11 | 17 | 13 | 23 | 9 | Ret | DNS | 181 |
| 13 | (Germany) Nico Koch | Gas Gas | Ret | 12 | 13 | 22 | 14 | 15 | 11 | 15 | 9 | 22 | 14 | 13 | 29 | 12 | 14 | 10 | 11 | 13 | 9 | 11 | 18 | 11 | 18 | 12 | 165 |
| 14 | (Germany) Tim Koch | Husqvarna | 11 | 9 | 15 | 10 | 18 | 7 | | | | 9 | 15 | 17 | 15 | 21 | 10 | 14 | 16 | 16 | 26 | 8 | 11 | 12 | 15 | 11 | 160 |
| 15 | (Czech Republic) Petr Polák | Yamaha | 17 | 20 | 18 | 20 | 11 | 13 | 13 | 14 | 14 | 6 | 11 | 7 | Ret | DNS | DNS | 19 | 18 | 9 | 8 | 14 | 13 | 24 | Ret | 20 | 134 |
| 16 | (Switzerland) Kevin Brumann | Husqvarna | DNS | DNS | DNS | | | | 10 | 13 | Ret | 18 | 12 | 15 | 5 | 10 | 6 | 21 | Ret | DNS | 13 | Ret | 16 | 8 | 11 | 9 | 127 |
| 17 | (Austria) Marcel Stauffer | KTM | | | | | | | | | | | | | | | | 7 | 1 | 2 | | | | 3 | 6 | 5 | 112 |
| 18 | (Netherlands) Roan van de Moosdijk | KTM | | | | | | | | | | | | | 16 | Ret | Ret | 30 | 13 | 18 | 10 | 6 | 6 | 19 | 5 | 3 | 95 |
| 19 | (France) Boris Maillard | Suzuki | 30 | 22 | 25 | 19 | 20 | 20 | 18 | 21 | 18 | 12 | 18 | 16 | 19 | Ret | Ret | 12 | 14 | 12 | 15 | 12 | 22 | 7 | Ret | 10 | 94 |
| 20 | (Germany) Mark Scheu | Husqvarna | 19 | 19 | 20 | 21 | 24 | 21 | 23 | 22 | 22 | 13 | 19 | 27 | 17 | 20 | 27 | 11 | 9 | Ret | 14 | 15 | 12 | 17 | 8 | 15 | 87 |
| 21 | (Spain) Oriol Oliver | KTM | 12 | 14 | 2 | 11 | 9 | 2 | | | | | | | | | | | | | | | | | | | 82 |
| 22 | (United Kingdom) John Adamson | Husqvarna | Ret | 24 | 17 | 15 | 16 | 12 | 8 | 10 | 15 | 26 | 16 | 10 | Ret | 24 | 23 | 28 | Ret | 22 | 16 | Ret | Ret | 20 | 24 | 26 | 76 |
| 23 | (Netherlands) Jeffrey Herlings | KTM | | | | | | | | | | | | | 1 | 1 | 1 | | | | | | | | | | 75 |
| 24 | (Belgium) Brent Van Doninck | Honda | | | | | | | | | | | | | 3 | 4 | 3 | | | | | | | | | | 58 |
| 25 | (Germany) Cato Nickel | Husqvarna | 24 | 17 | Ret | 18 | 21 | 16 | 14 | 16 | 13 | | | | 31 | 16 | 16 | 17 | 17 | Ret | Ret | DNS | DNS | Ret | 25 | 18 | 53 |
| 26 | (Slovakia) Pavol Repčák | KTM | DNQ | DNQ | DNQ | DNQ | Ret | 26 | 22 | 25 | Ret | 16 | 17 | 8 | 24 | 22 | Ret | 16 | 20 | 19 | 19 | 17 | 15 | 21 | 27 | 23 | 42 |
| 27 | (Germany) Paul Haberland | Yamaha | Ret | 25 | Ret | 17 | 13 | 34 | 19 | 27 | 10 | | | | | | | 25 | DNS | DNS | 21 | 18 | 20 | Ret | 14 | DNS | 36 |
| 28 | (Switzerland) Loris Freidig | Husqvarna | 27 | DNS | Ret | 30 | 28 | 22 | 34 | 35 | 23 | 17 | 23 | 19 | | | | 22 | 21 | 8 | | | | 10 | 21 | 19 | 32 |
| 29 | (Netherlands) Jeremy Knuiman | Gas Gas | 18 | Ret | Ret | 9 | 15 | 14 | 38 | 26 | 19 | 27 | 24 | 30 | Ret | 34 | 21 | Ret | DNS | DNS | DNQ | DNQ | DNQ | | | | 30 |
| 30 | (Slovakia) Tomáš Kohút | KTM | | | | | | | | | | | | | | | | 27 | 15 | 14 | Ret | 19 | 17 | 16 | 16 | 21 | 29 |
| 31 | (Estonia) Hardi Roosiorg | KTM | 15 | 11 | 19 | | | | | | | | | | Ret | 11 | Ret | | | | | | | | | | 28 |
| 32 | (Latvia) Tomass Šileika | Gas Gas | 13 | 13 | 22 | Ret | 23 | 24 | 16 | 17 | Ret | | | | | | | | | | | | | | | | 25 |
| 33 | (Estonia) Gert Krestinov | Honda | 16 | 15 | 12 | Ret | 19 | DNS | | | | | | | | | | | | | | | | | | | 22 |
| 34 | (Estonia) Harri Kullas | Husqvarna | 10 | 18 | 14 | | | | | | | | | | | | | | | | | | | | | | 21 |
| 35 | (Estonia) Tanel Leok | Husqvarna | | | | | | | | | | | | | | | | | | | | | | 18 | 13 | 14 | 18 |
| 36 | (Sweden) Albin Gerhardsson | Husqvarna | | | | | | | | | | | | | 22 | 13 | 12 | | | | | | | | | | 17 |
| 37 | (Estonia) Meico Vettik | KTM | | | | | | | | | | | | | 13 | 17 | 19 | | | | | | | | | | 14 |
| 38 | (Estonia) Kaarel Tilk | Husqvarna | 36 | 28 | 24 | DNQ | DNQ | 29 | 21 | 33 | 17 | 31 | 30 | 26 | 20 | 18 | 15 | DNQ | DNQ | DNQ | DNQ | DNQ | DNQ | | | | 14 |
| 39 | (Denmark) Glen Meier | Suzuki | 20 | 10 | 27 | | | | | | | | | | | | | | | | | | | | | | 12 |
| 40 | (Belgium) Jens Getteman | Husqvarna | 35 | 23 | DNS | | | | 27 | 20 | 25 | 25 | 26 | 24 | | | | | | | | | | 15 | 17 | 32 | 11 |
| 41 | (Spain) Victor Alonso | Gas Gas | | | | | | | | | | | | | 14 | Ret | Ret | | | | | | | | | | 7 |
| 42 | (Sweden) Anton Gole | Husqvarna | | | | | | | | | | 14 | Ret | DNS | | | | | | | | | | | | | 7 |
| 43 | (Austria) Markus Rammel | KTM | | | | 32 | Ret | 36 | 29 | 19 | Ret | | | | 30 | 29 | 17 | Ret | DNS | DNS | | | | | | | 6 |
| 44 | (Germany) Max Thunecke | Honda | 22 | 26 | 23 | 23 | 22 | 28 | 24 | 24 | 20 | 21 | 27 | 25 | 21 | 25 | 20 | 29 | 22 | 17 | 34 | 21 | 26 | 23 | 22 | 24 | 6 |
| 45 | (Switzerland) Robin Scheiben | Gas Gas | | | | | | | | | | DNQ | DNQ | 32 | | | | 32 | Ret | 27 | | | | 28 | 26 | 17 | 4 |
| 46 | (Germany) Mike Stender | Gas Gas | DNQ | DNQ | DNQ | | | | | | | 19 | 20 | Ret | | | | | | | | | | 33 | 20 | 22 | 4 |
| 47 | (Czech Republic) Martin Krč | KTM | DNQ | DNQ | DNQ | | | | 37 | 36 | 31 | 28 | Ret | 18 | | | | 24 | 24 | Ret | | | | | | | 3 |
| 48 | (Austria) Michael Sandner | KTM | | | | | | | | | | | | | | | | 18 | Ret | DNS | | | | | | | 3 |
| 49 | (Denmark) Mathias Jørgensen | Kawasaki | | | | | | | | | | | | | | | | | | | 20 | Ret | 19 | | | | 3 |
| 50 | (Germany) Elias Stapel | Yamaha | | | | | | | | | | 29 | 22 | 21 | | | | DNQ | DNQ | DNQ | | | | 22 | 19 | Ret | 2 |
| 51 | (Netherlands) Raf Meuwissen | KTM | 23 | 34 | 29 | 25 | Ret | 19 | 33 | 39 | DNS | Ret | Ret | 33 | Ret | Ret | DNS | 23 | Ret | DNS | | | | | | | 2 |
| 52 | (Germany) Toni Hoffmann | KTM | 33 | 31 | 33 | 36 | 34 | Ret | 28 | 23 | 27 | 20 | Ret | 34 | 26 | 35 | Ret | Ret | 25 | 20 | 22 | Ret | 24 | | | | 2 |
| 53 | (Czech Republic) Adam Dušek | KTM | DNQ | DNQ | DNQ | 31 | 32 | 31 | 32 | 34 | 28 | 24 | 21 | 22 | | | | 33 | 29 | 23 | 24 | 20 | 30 | | | | 1 |
| | (Czech Republic) Václav Kovář | KTM | 26 | 27 | 28 | 28 | 27 | 27 | 26 | 31 | 21 | | | | 34 | 30 | 24 | 26 | 23 | 21 | 25 | 22 | 21 | 27 | 31 | 27 | 0 |
| | (Germany) Fynn-Niklas Tornau | Husqvarna | 25 | 21 | 21 | DNQ | DNQ | DNQ | | | | | | | | | | | | | | | | | | | 0 |
| | (Germany) Marnique Appelt | Gas Gas | 21 | 30 | 26 | 24 | 26 | 33 | 30 | 32 | 26 | 33 | 25 | 29 | 28 | 27 | 22 | 31 | 28 | 24 | 30 | Ret | 28 | 31 | 29 | 30 | 0 |
| | (Finland) Emil Weckman | KTM | | | | | | | | | | | | | | | | | | | 23 | 24 | 25 | 29 | 23 | 25 | 0 |
| | (Slovakia) Šimon Jošt | Suzuki | DNQ | DNQ | DNQ | DNQ | DNQ | DNQ | | | | 23 | Ret | 23 | | | | | | | | | | | | | 0 |
| | (Netherlands) Mike Bolink | Yamaha | 32 | 29 | 31 | 26 | 25 | 25 | 25 | 28 | 24 | 34 | 29 | 36 | 23 | 26 | Ret | DNQ | DNQ | DNQ | 31 | DNS | Ret | | | | 0 |
| | (Netherlands) Sven van der Mierden | Kawasaki | | | | | | | | | | | | | 27 | 23 | Ret | | | | | | | | | | 0 |
| | (France) Bogdan Krajewski | Yamaha | | | | | | | | | | | | | 25 | 28 | 25 | | | | | | | | | | 0 |
| | (Denmark) Victor Kleemann | KTM | DNQ | DNQ | DNQ | DNQ | DNQ | DNQ | DNQ | DNQ | DNQ | DNQ | DNQ | DNQ | DNQ | DNQ | DNQ | 35 | 31 | 25 | Ret | 27 | 29 | DNQ | DNQ | DNQ | 0 |
| | (Germany) Moritz Schittenhelm | KTM | | | | | | | | | | | | | | | | 36 | 32 | Ret | | | | 25 | 28 | Ret | 0 |
| | (Czech Republic) Radim Kraus | KTM | | | | | | | | | | | | | | | | DNQ | DNQ | DNQ | 32 | 25 | Ret | | | | 0 |
| | (Belgium) Thomas Vermijl | Gas Gas | 34 | 32 | 32 | 29 | 30 | 30 | 31 | 30 | Ret | 37 | 31 | Ret | DNQ | 31 | 26 | DNQ | DNQ | DNQ | 28 | 28 | 27 | 34 | 32 | 34 | 0 |
| | (Germany) Eric Schönburg | KTM | | | | | | | | | | 32 | 28 | 28 | | | | DNQ | 27 | 26 | | | | Ret | Ret | 31 | 0 |
| | (Germany) Vincent Gallwitz | Gas Gas | | | | | | | 35 | 29 | 29 | 30 | 32 | 31 | DNQ | DNQ | DNQ | | | | 27 | 26 | 32 | | | | 0 |
| | (United Kingdom) Calum Mitchell | Husqvarna | DNQ | DNQ | DNQ | 27 | 29 | Ret | | | | | | | | | | | | | | | | | | | 0 |
| | (Latvia) Mairis Pumpurs | Husqvarna | | | | | | | | | | | | | | | | | | | | | | DNQ | Ret | 28 | 0 |
| | (Germany) Kevin Winkle | KTM | | | | | | | | | | | | | | | | DNQ | 30 | 29 | | | | 30 | 30 | 29 | 0 |
| | (Germany) Max Bülow | KTM | DNQ | DNQ | DNQ | 35 | 33 | 35 | DNQ | DNQ | DNQ | 36 | 34 | 37 | DNQ | DNQ | DNQ | DNQ | DNQ | DNQ | 33 | 29 | 31 | 32 | 34 | Ret | 0 |
| | (Germany) Marco Fleissig | Honda | | | | | | | | | | | | | | | | DNQ | DNQ | DNQ | 29 | 31 | 34 | Ret | 33 | 33 | 0 |
| | (Germany) Leon Rehberg | Fantic | 29 | 33 | Ret | Ret | Ret | DNS | | | | | | | | | | | | | | | | | | | 0 |
| | (Czech Republic) Pavel Dvořáček | Yamaha | 31 | Ret | 30 | 33 | 31 | 32 | | | | | | | | | | | | | Ret | DNS | DNS | | | | 0 |
| | (Germany) Paul Ullrich | Kawasaki | | | | DNQ | DNQ | DNQ | DNQ | DNQ | DNQ | DNQ | DNQ | DNQ | DNQ | DNQ | DNQ | | | | DNQ | 30 | 33 | | | | 0 |
| | (Netherlands) Lars Looman | Yamaha | | | | DNQ | DNQ | DNQ | 36 | 38 | 30 | DNQ | DNQ | DNQ | | | | | | | | | | | | | 0 |
| | (Denmark) Jakob Nielsen | Suzuki | | | | | | | | | | | | | 32 | 32 | Ret | 37 | 33 | Ret | | | | | | | 0 |
| | (Sweden) Samuel Flink | Yamaha | DNQ | DNQ | DNQ | DNQ | DNQ | DNQ | DNQ | 37 | 32 | 35 | 33 | 35 | DNQ | 33 | Ret | DNQ | DNQ | DNQ | DNQ | DNQ | DNQ | | | | 0 |
| | (Germany) Theo Praun | Yamaha | DNQ | DNQ | DNQ | | | | | | | DNQ | DNQ | DNQ | | | | DNQ | DNQ | DNQ | DNQ | 32 | 36 | | | | 0 |
| | (Germany) Benjamin Mallon | Gas Gas | | | | | | | DNQ | DNQ | 33 | | | | | | | | | | | | | | | | 0 |
| | (Germany) Justin Trache | Yamaha | Ret | Ret | Ret | 34 | DNS | DNS | 40 | Ret | Ret | | | | | | | | | | | | | | | | 0 |
| | (Italy) Giacomo Redondi | Gas Gas | | | | | | | | | | | | | | | | 34 | DNS | DNS | | | | | | | 0 |
| | (Germany) Phil Niklas Löb | KTM | | | | | | | | | | Ret | 35 | 38 | | | | DNQ | DNQ | DNQ | | | | | | | 0 |
| | (Netherlands) Jorn Weeren | Husqvarna | | | | | | | DNQ | DNQ | DNQ | DNQ | DNQ | DNQ | DNQ | DNQ | DNQ | | | | Ret | Ret | 35 | DNQ | DNQ | DNQ | 0 |
| | (Germany) Sascha Ströbele | Gas Gas | | | | | | | | | | DNQ | DNQ | DNQ | | | | | | | | | | DNQ | DNQ | 35 | 0 |
| | (Germany) Pascal Jungmann | Honda | DNQ | DNQ | DNQ | 37 | Ret | Ret | DNQ | DNQ | DNQ | | | | | | | | | | | | | | | | 0 |
| | (Germany) Janik Schröter | Yamaha | | | | | | | 39 | DNS | DNS | | | | | | | | | | | | | | | | 0 |
| | (Germany) Gianluca Ecca | Yamaha | | | | | | | | | | | | | Ret | Ret | DNS | | | | | | | | | | 0 |
| | (Germany) Gerrit Heistermann | Yamaha | DNQ | DNQ | DNQ | DNQ | DNQ | DNQ | | | | DNQ | DNQ | DNQ | DNQ | DNQ | DNQ | | | | DNQ | DNQ | DNQ | DNQ | DNQ | DNQ | 0 |
| | (Germany) Tobias Linke | Kawasaki | DNQ | DNQ | DNQ | DNQ | DNQ | DNQ | DNQ | DNQ | DNQ | | | | DNQ | DNQ | DNQ | | | | | | | | | | 0 |
| | (Netherlands) Jeremy de Jong | Gas Gas | DNQ | DNQ | DNQ | | | | DNQ | DNQ | DNQ | DNQ | DNQ | DNQ | DNQ | DNQ | DNQ | | | | | | | | | | 0 |
| | (Germany) Luca Harms | KTM | | | | | | | DNQ | DNQ | DNQ | DNQ | DNQ | DNQ | | | | DNQ | DNQ | DNQ | DNQ | DNQ | DNQ | | | | 0 |
| | (Germany) Marvin Koch | Husqvarna | | | | | | | | | | DNQ | DNQ | DNQ | DNQ | DNQ | DNQ | DNQ | DNQ | DNQ | | | | DNQ | DNQ | DNQ | 0 |
| | (Germany) John Vogelwaid | KTM | | | | | | | | | | DNQ | DNQ | DNQ | | | | DNQ | DNQ | DNQ | DNQ | DNQ | DNQ | DNQ | DNQ | DNQ | 0 |
| | (Poland) Jakub Barczewski | KTM | DNQ | DNQ | DNQ | DNQ | DNQ | DNQ | DNQ | DNQ | DNQ | | | | | | | | | | | | | | | | 0 |
| | (Germany) Leonard Koch | Husqvarna | | | | | | | | | | DNQ | DNQ | DNQ | | | | DNQ | DNQ | DNQ | | | | DNQ | DNQ | DNQ | 0 |
| | (Germany) Marvin Pfeffer | KTM | DNQ | DNQ | DNQ | | | | | | | | | | | | | DNQ | DNQ | DNQ | | | | | | | 0 |
| | (Germany) Eric Schwella | KTM | DNQ | DNQ | DNQ | | | | | | | | | | | | | | | | DNQ | DNQ | DNQ | | | | 0 |
| | (Poland) Jakub Kowalski | Husqvarna | | | | | | | DNQ | DNQ | DNQ | | | | | | | DNQ | DNQ | DNQ | | | | | | | 0 |
| | (Germany) Cedric Schick | Fantic | | | | | | | | | | | | | | | | DNQ | DNQ | DNQ | DNQ | DNQ | DNQ | | | | 0 |
| | (Germany) Christian Forderer | KTM | | | | | | | | | | | | | | | | DNQ | DNQ | DNQ | DNQ | DNQ | DNQ | | | | 0 |
| | (Germany) Henry Schönburg | KTM | | | | | | | | | | | | | | | | DNQ | DNQ | DNQ | | | | DNQ | DNQ | DNQ | 0 |
| | (Germany) Malik Schoch | Yamaha | | | | | | | | | | | | | | | | DNQ | DNQ | DNQ | | | | DNQ | DNQ | DNQ | 0 |
| | (Germany) Kevin Keim | KTM | | | | | | | | | | | | | | | | DNQ | DNQ | DNQ | | | | DNQ | DNQ | DNQ | 0 |
| | (Germany) Fabian Ströbele | Yamaha | | | | | | | | | | | | | | | | DNQ | DNQ | DNQ | | | | DNQ | DNQ | DNQ | 0 |
| | (Germany) Tim Kühner | Husqvarna | | | | | | | | | | | | | | | | DNQ | DNQ | DNQ | | | | DNQ | DNQ | DNQ | 0 |
| | (Germany) Nico Meintel | Honda | | | | | | | | | | | | | | | | DNQ | DNQ | DNQ | | | | DNQ | DNQ | DNQ | 0 |
| | (Austria) Marco Heidegger | Kawasaki | | | | | | | | | | | | | | | | DNQ | DNQ | DNQ | | | | DNQ | DNQ | DNQ | 0 |
| | (Germany) Stefan Frank | Honda | | | | | | | | | | | | | | | | DNQ | DNQ | DNQ | | | | DNQ | DNQ | DNQ | 0 |
| | (Germany) Markus Barth | Fantic | | | | | | | | | | | | | | | | DNQ | DNQ | DNQ | | | | DNQ | DNQ | DNQ | 0 |
| | (Czech Republic) Roman Mňuk | Yamaha | DNQ | DNQ | DNQ | | | | | | | | | | | | | | | | | | | | | | 0 |
| | (Czech Republic) Rudolf Weschta | KTM | DNQ | DNQ | DNQ | | | | | | | | | | | | | | | | | | | | | | 0 |
| | (Denmark) Christian Skøtt | Husqvarna | DNQ | DNQ | DNQ | | | | | | | | | | | | | | | | | | | | | | 0 |
| | (Belgium) Ugo Moors | Honda | DNQ | DNQ | DNQ | | | | | | | | | | | | | | | | | | | | | | 0 |
| | (Netherlands) Daniël Wendels | Kawasaki | DNQ | DNQ | DNQ | | | | | | | | | | | | | | | | | | | | | | 0 |
| | (Sweden) Fredrik Rask | Yamaha | DNQ | DNQ | DNQ | | | | | | | | | | | | | | | | | | | | | | 0 |
| | (Germany) Max Benthin | Suzuki | | | | DNQ | DNQ | DNQ | | | | | | | | | | | | | | | | | | | 0 |
| | (Germany) Ole Schmidt | Yamaha | | | | | | | DNQ | DNQ | DNQ | | | | | | | | | | | | | | | | 0 |
| | (Germany) Dino Skoppek | Gas Gas | | | | | | | DNQ | DNQ | DNQ | | | | | | | | | | | | | | | | 0 |
| | (Germany) Marvin Dietermann | KTM | | | | | | | | | | DNQ | DNQ | DNQ | | | | | | | | | | | | | 0 |
| | (Germany) Jonas Oerter | Gas Gas | | | | | | | | | | DNQ | DNQ | DNQ | | | | | | | | | | | | | 0 |
| | (Netherlands) Domien Vermeiren | Yamaha | | | | | | | | | | DNQ | DNQ | DNQ | | | | | | | | | | | | | 0 |
| | (Belgium) Björn Feyen | Honda | | | | | | | | | | DNQ | DNQ | DNQ | | | | | | | | | | | | | 0 |
| | (Slovakia) Matúš Tomala | KTM | | | | | | | | | | DNQ | DNQ | DNQ | | | | | | | | | | | | | 0 |
| | (Denmark) Sam Korneliussen | Fantic | | | | | | | | | | | | | DNQ | DNQ | DNQ | | | | | | | | | | 0 |
| | (Netherlands) Menno Aussems | Honda | | | | | | | | | | | | | DNQ | DNQ | DNQ | | | | | | | | | | 0 |
| | (Sweden) Axel Nilsson | Gas Gas | | | | | | | | | | | | | DNQ | DNQ | DNQ | | | | | | | | | | 0 |
| | (Germany) Florian Wiese | Gas Gas | | | | | | | | | | | | | DNQ | DNQ | DNQ | | | | | | | | | | 0 |
| | (Switzerland) Nico Häusermann | Yamaha | | | | | | | | | | | | | | | | DNQ | DNQ | DNQ | | | | | | | 0 |
| | (Spain) Joan David Rosell | KTM | | | | | | | | | | | | | | | | DNQ | DNQ | DNQ | | | | | | | 0 |
| | (Austria) Mario Pichler | Honda | | | | | | | | | | | | | | | | DNQ | DNQ | DNQ | | | | | | | 0 |
| | (Czech Republic) Martin Vondrášek | Husqvarna | | | | | | | | | | | | | | | | | | | DNQ | DNQ | DNQ | | | | 0 |
| | (Germany) Jakob Kurjat | Yamaha | | | | | | | | | | | | | | | | | | | DNQ | DNQ | DNQ | | | | 0 |
| | (Germany) Philipp Klakow | Husqvarna | | | | | | | | | | | | | | | | | | | | | | DNQ | DNQ | DNQ | 0 |
| Pos | Rider | Bike | FÜR (Brandenburg) | | | DRE (Brandenburg) | | | VEL (Mecklenburg-Vorpommern) | | | BIE (North Rhine-Westphalia) | | | TEN (Schleswig-Holstein) | | | GAI (Baden-Württemberg) | | | JAU (Saxony) | | | HOL (Baden-Württemberg) | | | Points |

== Youngster Cup ==
=== Participants ===
| Team | Constructor | No | Rider | Rounds |
|---|---|---|---|---|
| KTM Sarholz Racing Team | Husqvarna | 3 | (Germany) Linus Jung | 1–3 |
| KTM Sarholz Racing Team | KTM | 470 | (Germany) Peter König | 1–3 |
| Schmicker Racing | KTM | 12 | (Netherlands) Dave Kooiker | 1–3 |
| Schmicker Racing | KTM | 18 | (Denmark) William Kleemann | 1–3 |
| Schmicker Racing | KTM | 172 | (Netherlands) Lynn Valk | 1–3 |
| Schmicker Racing | KTM | 275 | (Germany) Eric Rakow | 1–3 |
| Bloody Harry Energy - RGS MX Team | Husqvarna | 17 | (Belgium) Junior Bal | 1–2 |
| Bloody Harry Energy - RGS MX Team | KTM | 446 | (Sweden) Linus Persson | 1–3 |
| Wozniak MX Racing Team | Yamaha | 22 | (Denmark) Nicolai Skovbjerg | 1 |
| BvZ Racing Team | KTM | 23 | (Germany) Oscar Denzau | 3 |
| BvZ Racing Team | KTM | 305 | (Germany) Tom Schröder | 1–3 |
| BvZ Racing Team | KTM | 350 | (Germany) Lennox Litzrodt | 1–3 |
| BvZ Racing Team | KTM | 677 | (Germany) Florian Brauns | 3 |
| Cat Moto Bauerschmidt Husqvarna | Husqvarna | 36 | (Switzerland) Nico Greutmann | 1–3 |
| Cat Moto Bauerschmidt Husqvarna | Husqvarna | 304 | (Australia) Liam Owens | 3 |
| Cat Moto Bauerschmidt Husqvarna | Husqvarna | 363 | (Liechtenstein) Lyonel Reichl | 1–3 |
| Sturm STC Racing | Gas Gas | 43 | (Latvia) Roberts Lūsis | 1–3 |
| Mefo Sport - Q Racing Team | Gas Gas | 49 | (Czech Republic) David Widerwill | 1, 3 |
| Mefo Sport - Q Racing Team | Gas Gas | 271 | (Czech Republic) Stanislav Vašíček | 3 |
| Mefo Sport - Q Racing Team | Gas Gas | 437 | (Czech Republic) Martin Venhoda | 1, 3 |
| Team #254 | Gas Gas | 55 | (Germany) Fiete-Joost Radbruch | 1–3 |
| KMP Honda Racing Team powered by Krettek | Honda | 57 | (Latvia) Edvards Bidzāns | 1–2 |
| KMP Honda Racing Team powered by Krettek | Honda | 408 | (Netherlands) Scott Smulders | 1–3 |
| KDH Motorsport powered by Fantic Motocenter | Fantic | 67 | (Germany) Lukas Hechtel | 3 |
| KTM Kosak Racing Team | KTM | 70 | (Germany) Valentin Kees | 1–3 |
| KTM Kosak Racing Team | KTM | 75 | (Netherlands) Bradley Mesters | 1–3 |
| KTM Kosak Racing Team | KTM | 428 | (Germany) Henry Obenland | 1–3 |
| WZ Racing KTM | KTM | 83 | (France) Maxime Grau | 1–3 |
| WZ Racing KTM | KTM | 262 | (Australia) Ryan Alexanderson | 1–3 |
| Orion Racing Team | KTM | 99 | (Czech Republic) Petr Rathouský | 1–3 |
| Becker Racing | KTM | 105 | (Denmark) Lucas Bruhn | 1–3 |
| Becker Racing | KTM | 543 | (Germany) Nick Domann | 1, 3 |
| Mefo Sport Racing Team | KTM | 110 | (Estonia) Richard Paat | 1–3 |
| Mefo Sport Racing Team | KTM | 837 | (Estonia) Robin Kruuse | 1–3 |
| VNT Racing Team | Gas Gas | 114 | (Belgium) Nicolas Vennekens | 1–3 |
| Wiese Motorsport | KTM | 126 | (Germany) Florian Wiese | 3 |
| Rynopower-Germany Racing | KTM | 127 | (Germany) Niklas Ohm | 1, 3 |
| Twenty Racing Team | Gas Gas | 141 | (Netherlands) Damien Knuiman | 1–2 |
| Team #254 | Gas Gas | 155 | (Germany) Tom Schröder | 3 |
| Terrapro Racing Moto | TM | 162 | (Czech Republic) Tomáš Ptáček | 1 |
| | Honda | 176 | (Germany) Robbie Dworschak | 1 |
| Werthmann Racing Team by Mefo Sport | KTM | 191 | (Lithuania) Erlandas Mackonis | 1–3 |
| Werthmann Racing Team by Mefo Sport | KTM | 622 | (Germany) Fabian Trossen | 1 |
| HTS KTM | KTM | 214 | (Hungary) Bence Pergel | 1–3 |
| TBS Conversions KTM Racing Team | KTM | 220 | (Estonia) Martin Michelis | 1–2 |
| Auctor MX Team | Honda | 223 | (Czech Republic) Přemysl Zimek | 1–3 |
| SixtySeven Racing Husqvarna | Husqvarna | 282 | (Germany) Jakob Zweiacker | 1–3 |
| SixtySeven Racing Husqvarna | Husqvarna | 511 | (Germany) Jan Krug | 1–3 |
| MS Motorcycles | Husqvarna | 290 | (Germany) Joshua Völker | 1–3 |
| Falcon Motorsports | KTM | 306 | (Germany) Julian Duvier | 1–3 |
| Falcon Motorsports | KTM | 518 | (Germany) Fritz Greiner | 1 |
| MX For Live - Stara Gwardia | KTM | 311 | (Poland) Damian Zdunek | 1–3 |
| MX For Live - Stara Gwardia | Gas Gas | 929 | (Poland) Jan Kotowicz | 2–3 |
| Team Zimt und Zucker | Husqvarna | 332 | (Germany) Gustav Busch | 2–3 |
| JJ Racing | Husqvarna | 345 | (Germany) Fabian Kling | 1, 3 |
| TYK - Team Yamaha Knobloch | Yamaha | 415 | (Germany) Karl Greiner | 1–3 |
| MX-Handel Racing | Husqvarna | 444 | (Estonia) Sebastian Leok | 1–3 |
| FDI Racing | Husqvarna | 447 | (Czech Republic) Jiří Klejšmíd | 1, 3 |
| | Husqvarna | 474 | (Denmark) Magnus Gregersen | 1–3 |
| Husqvarna SKS Racing | Husqvarna | 492 | (Netherlands) Yourick den Hollander | 1 |
| MRA Racing Team | Gas Gas | 499 | (Slovakia) Jaroslav Katriňák | 1–3 |
| Yamaha Meyer Racing | Yamaha | 532 | (Germany) Constantin Piller | 1–3 |
| Rhino Racing Team | Yamaha | 572 | (Denmark) Rasmus Pedersen | 1–3 |
| Rhino Racing Team | Yamaha | 633 | (Denmark) Jakob Frandsen | 1 |
| Motor2000 KTM Team | KTM | 601 | (United Kingdom) Kelton Gwyther | 3 |
| Motorrad Bauerschmidt MB33 | Husqvarna | 604 | (Germany) Jimmy Opitz | 1–3 |
| MX Moduls | Gas Gas | 611 | (Latvia) Markuss Kokins | 1 |
| Marmorest/MehkaMoto | Gas Gas | 612 | (Estonia) Joosep Pärn | 1–3 |
| KTM Switzerland - Motoshop Zachmann | KTM | 626 | (Switzerland) Joel Elsener | 1–3 |
| 634 Racing Team | Husqvarna | 634 | (Belgium) Maeron Peeters | 1 |
| OC Racing | Honda | 642 | (Denmark) Oliver Agathon Hald | 1 |
| KTM GST Berlin Racing | KTM | 645 | (Germany) Richard Stephan | 1–3 |
| Enduro Koch Racing | Fantic | 770 | (Germany) Leon Rudolph | 1–3 |
| | Yamaha | 848 | (Denmark) Emil Gjedde | 2–3 |
| GripMesser Racing Team | Gas Gas | 905 | (Germany) Colin Sarre | 1–3 |
| GripMesser Racing Team | KTM | 938 | (Brazil) Rodolfo Bicalho | 1, 3 |
| Mefo Sport Racing Team by OC Racing | Yamaha | 933 | (Denmark) Frederik Eskildsen | 1 |
| Eckert Racing Team | TM | 954 | (Germany) Kjell Maurice Wendt | 3 |

=== Riders Championship ===
| Pos | Rider | Bike | FÜR (Brandenburg) | DRE (Brandenburg) | VEL (Mecklenburg-Vorpommern) | BIE (North Rhine-Westphalia) | TEN (Schleswig-Holstein) | GAI (Baden-Württemberg) | JAU (Saxony) | HOL (Baden-Württemberg) | Points |
|---|---|---|---|---|---|---|---|---|---|---|---|
| 1 | | | | | | | | | | | 0 |
| Pos | Rider | Bike | FÜR (Brandenburg) | DRE (Brandenburg) | VEL (Mecklenburg-Vorpommern) | BIE (North Rhine-Westphalia) | TEN (Schleswig-Holstein) | GAI (Baden-Württemberg) | JAU (Saxony) | HOL (Baden-Württemberg) | Points |
