= 2026 ADAC MX Masters =

German Motocross Competition in 2026

The 2026 ADAC MX Masters season was the 22nd ADAC MX Masters season. The series consisted of six rounds across Germany and one in France, running from April to September.

Dutchman Roan van de Moosdijk was the reigning champion in the champion in the premier MX Masters category, after he took his first title in 2025. van De Moosdijk successfully defending his title, making him the first Dutch rider to win back-to-back championships in the series.

In the second tier Youngster Cup class, Danish rider Mads Fredsøe was the reigning champion. It was another Danish rider, Nicolai Skovbjerg, who would ultimately come out on top to win his first ADAC MX Masters title.

A round initially scheduled to be held at the Bielstein track was cancelled prior to the start of the season.

== Race calendar and results ==
=== MX Masters ===
Round	Date	Location	Race 1 Winner	Race 2 Winner	Race 3 Winner	Round Winner
1	4–5 April	(North Rhine-Westphalia) Grevenbroich	(Germany) Max Nagl	(Germany) Max Nagl	(Germany) Max Nagl	(Germany) Max Nagl
2	9–10 May	(Brandenburg) Dreetz	(Germany) Simon Längenfelder	(Germany) Simon Längenfelder	(Germany) Max Nagl	(Germany) Simon Längenfelder
3	16–17 May	(France) Bitche	(Germany) Max Nagl	(Germany) Max Nagl	(Netherlands) Roan van de Moosdijk	(Germany) Max Nagl
4	13–14 June	(Schleswig-Holstein) Tensfeld	(Germany) Tom Koch	(Germany) Maximilian Spies	(Finland) Jere Haavisto	(Netherlands) Roan van de Moosdijk
5	8–9 August	(Baden-Württemberg) Gaildorf	(Netherlands) Roan van de Moosdijk	(Netherlands) Roan van de Moosdijk	(Netherlands) Roan van de Moosdijk	(Netherlands) Roan van de Moosdijk
6	29–30 August	(Mecklenburg-Vorpommern) Vellahn	(Estonia) Jörgen-Matthias Talviku	(Estonia) Jörgen-Matthias Talviku	(Estonia) Jörgen-Matthias Talviku	(Estonia) Jörgen-Matthias Talviku
7	26–27 September	(Brandenburg) Fürstlich Drehna	(Netherlands) Roan van de Moosdijk	(Netherlands) Roan van de Moosdijk	(Netherlands) Roan van de Moosdijk	(Netherlands) Roan van de Moosdijk

=== Youngster Cup ===
Round	Date	Location	Race 1 Winner	Race 2 Winner	Race 3 Winner	Round Winner
1	4–5 April	(North Rhine-Westphalia) Grevenbroich	(Denmark) Nicolai Skovbjerg	(Australia) Liam Owens	(Netherlands) Scott Smulders	(Netherlands) Scott Smulders
2	9–10 May	(Brandenburg) Dreetz	(Netherlands) Scott Smulders	(Netherlands) Scott Smulders	(Denmark) Nicolai Skovbjerg	(Denmark) Nicolai Skovbjerg
3	16–17 May	(France) Bitche	(Denmark) Mads Fredsøe	(Denmark) Nicolai Skovbjerg	(Denmark) Nicolai Skovbjerg	(Denmark) Nicolai Skovbjerg
4	13–14 June	(Schleswig-Holstein) Tensfeld	(Denmark) Nicolai Skovbjerg	(Denmark) Nicolai Skovbjerg	(Denmark) Nicolai Skovbjerg	(Denmark) Nicolai Skovbjerg
5	8–9 August	(Baden-Württemberg) Gaildorf	(Denmark) Nicolai Skovbjerg	(Denmark) Nicolai Skovbjerg	(Estonia) Sebastian Leok	(Estonia) Sebastian Leok
6	29–30 August	(Mecklenburg-Vorpommern) Vellahn	(Denmark) Nicolai Skovbjerg	(Netherlands) Gyan Doensen	(Netherlands) Gyan Doensen	(Netherlands) Gyan Doensen
7	26–27 September	(Brandenburg) Fürstlich Drehna	(Denmark) Nicolai Skovbjerg	(Denmark) Nicolai Skovbjerg	(Estonia) Sebastian Leok	(Denmark) Nicolai Skovbjerg

=== Circuit locations ===
2026 ADAC MX Masters locations

== MX Masters ==
=== Participants ===
Team	Constructor	No	Rider	Rounds
	KTM	4	(Germany) Björn Cornels	4
Yamaha Motor Schweiz	Yamaha	5	(Switzerland) Flavio Wolf	3
Becker Racing	KTM	7	(Germany) Maximilian Spies	1–6
Becker Racing	KTM	260	(Germany) Nico Koch	1–4, 6–7
Becker Racing	Gas Gas	278	(Belgium) Thomas Vermijl	All
Becker Racing	KTM	440	(Germany) Marnique Appelt	2
	Gas Gas	9	(Austria) Marco Heidegger	5
Dörr Motorsport Triumph Racing	Triumph	12	(Germany) Max Nagl	1–4
Red Bull KTM Factory Racing Team	KTM	27	(Germany) Simon Längenfelder	2
BvZ Racing Team	KTM	34	(Germany) Toni Hoffmann	1, 3–4, 6
MX-Academy Honda Racing by Meuwissen Motorsports	Honda	36	(Switzerland) Nico Greutmann	1–4
MX-Academy Honda Racing by Meuwissen Motorsports	Honda	81	(Belgium) Emile De Baere	1
MX-Academy Honda Racing by Meuwissen Motorsports	Honda	491	(Germany) Paul Haberland	1–5
Kosak Racing Team	KTM	39	(Netherlands) Roan van de Moosdijk	All
MotoproX MRA Racing Team	Husqvarna	45	(Slovakia) Tomáš Kohút	All
KTM SB Racing	KTM	48	(Netherlands) Jens Walvoort	1
Motostar Racing	Yamaha	52	(Sweden) Albin Gerhardsson	1
VNT Racing	KTM	53	(Belgium) Greg Smets	2–3, 6
VNT Racing	Yamaha	114	(Belgium) Nicolas Vennekens	1
Ducati Riga	Ducati	57	(Latvia) Edvards Bidzāns	5–6
Kemaro Motosports	Yamaha	61	(Germany) Robin Schumann	5
De Baere Racing	Fantic	81	(Belgium) Emile De Baere	7
SHR Motorsports by Hartje	Yamaha	82	(Belgium) Lars Huysmans	7
SHR Motorsports by Hartje	Yamaha	92	(Switzerland) Valentin Guillod	5
SHR Motorsports by Hartje	Yamaha	125	(Finland) Emil Weckman	1–4, 6–7
SHR Motorsports by Hartje	Yamaha	261	(Estonia) Jörgen-Matthias Talviku	All
	Yamaha	85	(Denmark) Kasper Bæk Iversen	4
MX-Handel Husqvarna Racing	Husqvarna	87	(Switzerland) Kevin Brumann	4–5, 7
MX-Handel Husqvarna Racing	Husqvarna	622	(Germany) Fabian Trossen	4–6
Motorspeed.no	KTM	89	(Norway) Markus Sommerstad	4–7
Sturm STC Racing	Yamaha	90	(Germany) Justin Trache	3
S-Tech Racing Products	Ducati	96	(Spain) Víctor Alonso	5
Werthmann Racing Team by Mefo Sport	KTM	99	(Czech Republic) Petr Rathouský	1, 4–7
Werthmann Racing Team by Mefo Sport	KTM	130	(Czech Republic) Radim Kraus	5
Werthmann Racing Team by Mefo Sport	KTM	138	(Denmark) William Kleemann	All
Werthmann Racing Team by Mefo Sport	Gas Gas	271	(Czech Republic) Stanislav Vašíček	1, 3, 5
Werthmann Racing Team by Mefo Sport	Triumph	716	(Germany) Leon Rehberg	2–7
VisuAlz Production Racing Team	KTM	101	(Czech Republic) Václav Kovář	1, 4–5, 7
VisuAlz Production Racing Team	KTM	224	(Czech Republic) Jakub Terešák	1, 3–4
VisuAlz Production Racing Team	Kawasaki	891	(Germany) Paul Ullrich	1–4, 6–7
FRT Racing	Yamaha	104	(Germany) Dominik Grau	1–2, 4, 6
FRT Racing	KTM	136	(Germany) Luca Harms	4
FRT Racing	KTM	171	(Germany) Fynn-Niklas Tornau	All
Team BuyMX Yamaha	Yamaha	107	(Netherlands) Lars van Berkel	1
Team BuyMX Yamaha	Yamaha	611	(Latvia) Markuss Kokins	5–7
Triumph Berlin-Mini-X Racing	Triumph	111	(Germany) Max Benthin	2
KMP Honda Racing by DVAG	Honda	131	(Germany) Cato Nickel	1–6
KMP Honda Racing by DVAG	Honda	911	(France) Jordi Tixier	1, 6–7
Schmicker Silve Racing	KTM	142	(Finland) Jere Haavisto	All
Schmicker Silve Racing	KTM	151	(Estonia) Harri Kullas	1–2
Marin & Fritid Racing Team	Husqvarna	158	(Sweden) Kewin Palmér	1
Kawasaki Pfeil	Kawasaki	159	(Germany) Tobias Linke	4
Honda Dream Racing Bells	Honda	163	(Japan) Yuki Okura	2
AMX Racing	KTM	178	(Switzerland) Ramon Keller	5
AMX Racing	KTM	227	(Germany) Vincent Gallwitz	1–4, 6–7
Team Leoparden Racing	Honda	180	(Sweden) Leopold Ambjörnsson	2
Ven Venrooy KTM Racing	KTM	181	(Netherlands) Rick Elzinga	4
Easy Racing/Yamaha Scandinavia	Yamaha	192	(Denmark) Glen Meier	7
	KTM	200	(Germany) Dave Abbing	2
OSK Racing Team	Triumph	208	(Germany) Ben Gosepath	3, 7
KTM Sarholz Racing Team	KTM	226	(Germany) Tom Koch	All
KTM Sarholz Racing Team	KTM	300	(Germany) Noah Ludwig	All
Triumph Schwäbische Alb	Triumph	228	(Germany) Tim Kühner	5
Triumph Schwäbische Alb	Triumph	898	(Germany) Elias Stapel	5
A-Team	KTM	244	(Germany) Max Bülow	All
Turing Insights Racing	Husqvarna	247	(South Africa) Jean Visser	5–6
	Honda	288	(France) Axel Billottet	5
RGS Racing	KTM	306	(Germany) Julian Duvier	1
RGS Racing	Yamaha	460	(Sweden) Anton Neidert	1–2, 7
RGS Racing	Triumph	560	(Sweden) Liam Åkerlund	7
RGS Racing	Yamaha	750	(Sweden) Samuel Flink	All
Motorrad Waldmann/MSC Gaildorf	Yamaha	328	(Germany) Theo Praun	5–6
Fantic Schweiz	Fantic	331	(Switzerland) Loris Freidig	3, 5
JJ Racing	Husqvarna	345	(Germany) Fabian Kling	1–3, 5–7
Ventimo MotoExtreme Honda	Honda	377	(Estonia) Gert Krestinov	2, 4
Osička MX Team	KTM	401	(Austria) Marcel Stauffer	1
Johannes-Bikes Suzuki	Suzuki	410	(Germany) Max Thunecke	All
Johannes-Bikes Suzuki	Suzuki	991	(Germany) Mark Scheu	All
TKS Racing Team	Husqvarna	468	(Germany) Lukas Fiedler	2, 5–7
KTM GST Berlin Racing	KTM	470	(Germany) Peter König	All
Kemco Management	KTM	484	(Netherlands) Dave Kooiker	1–2, 6
SixtySeven Racing Team	Husqvarna	505	(Sweden) Arvid Lüning	1, 7
SixtySeven Racing Team	KTM	710	(Belgium) Adrien Wagener	1, 3
Meyer Racing Team	Yamaha	532	(Germany) Constantin Piller	5, 7
	Triumph	555	(Germany) Noel Schmitt	1, 3–4, 6
	Honda	619	(Luxembourg) Damien De Muyser	1
HTS KTM Racing Team	KTM	696	(Switzerland) Mike Gwerder	3–7
	Husqvarna	733	(Estonia) Kaarel Tilk	1–3, 5–7
RDMX	KTM	828	(Belgium) Tom Dukerts	1, 3
	Yamaha	879	(France) Edgard Moncel	3
S-Tech Racing	Yamaha	931	(Germany) Marco Fleissig	5
	Honda	952	(France) Ludovic Macler	3
Mefo Sport Racing Team	KTM	992	(Germany) Marvin Pfeffer	1, 3
	KTM	994	(Slovenia) Jure Božnar	2, 5

=== Riders Championship ===
Pos	Rider	Bike	GRE (North Rhine-Westphalia)			DRE (Brandenburg)			BIT (France)			TEN (Schleswig-Holstein)			GAI (Baden-Württemberg)			VEL (Mecklenburg-Vorpommern)			FÜR (Brandenburg)			Points
1	(Netherlands) Roan van de Moosdijk	KTM	2	2	2	4	2	2	2	2	1	2	2	2	1	1	1	2	2	2	1	1	1	479
2	(Germany) Tom Koch	KTM	3	9	3	7	6	6	6	4	4	1	5	5	3	2	2	4	5	4	6	3	3	375
3	(Finland) Jere Haavisto	KTM	5	4	9	5	5	9	3	3	5	14	3	1	8	17	Ret	3	4	3	5	2	2	333
4	(Estonia) Jörgen-Matthias Talviku	Yamaha	13	3	4	6	8	Ret	9	6	3	4	14	4	6	DSQ	3	1	1	1	2	6	Ret	311
5	(Germany) Noah Ludwig	KTM	10	6	10	15	10	4	Ret	12	7	3	4	9	2	4	4	5	3	10	4	7	4	300
6	(Germany) Maximilian Spies	KTM	4	10	6	3	4	5	4	5	8	6	1	3	4	5	8	26	DNS	DNS				252
7	(Germany) Max Nagl	Triumph	1	1	1	2	3	1	1	1	2	34	DNS	DNS										214
8	(Germany) Max Thunecke	Suzuki	14	16	12	12	16	12	11	14	10	9	13	12	14	13	17	14	9	12	7	5	7	192
9	(Germany) Nico Koch	KTM	7	8	8	10	18	13	8	8	6	8	6	13				7	Ret	DNS	32	10	8	177
10	(Slovakia) Tomáš Kohút	Husqvarna	12	7	7	13	9	Ret	14	7	15	11	19	Ret	11	Ret	9	10	10	Ret	11	11	13	168
11	(Germany) Peter König	KTM	15	11	15	16	14	11	5	16	11	23	8	8	20	16	16	13	17	14	13	9	10	162
12	(Switzerland) Kevin Brumann	Husqvarna										5	10	7	5	3	5				3	8	6	141
13	(Switzerland) Nico Greutmann	Honda	Ret	13	5	8	7	10	13	Ret	9	7	7	11										120
14	(Estonia) Kaarel Tilk	Husqvarna	28	15	14	17	17	16	10	13	13				19	20	21	18	11	6	12	15	5	115
15	(Germany) Cato Nickel	Honda	18	18	25	20	21	15	Ret	15	14	10	17	15	Ret	8	10	11	7	9				107
16	(Finland) Emil Weckman	Yamaha	19	14	17	14	Ret	17	12	11	Ret	15	9	20				12	8	Ret	18	12	11	106
17	(Latvia) Markuss Kokins	Yamaha													9	12	18	6	6	7	14	4	9	105
18	(Switzerland) Mike Gwerder	KTM							18	23	17	12	16	17	13	9	6	9	Ret	8	8	Ret	DNS	98
19	(Denmark) William Kleemann	KTM	21	17	20	27	Ret	22	Ret	18	16	18	15	14	21	18	20	17	13	11	9	16	12	81
20	(Germany) Simon Längenfelder	KTM				1	1	3																70
21	(Czech Republic) Jakub Terešák	KTM	16	12	18				7	9	Ret	17	11	10										68
22	(Germany) Paul Haberland	Honda	17	24	19	22	15	Ret	15	10	12	Ret	Ret	DNS	17	7	11							66
23	(France) Jordi Tixier	Honda	6	31	13													8	Ret	5	31	13	Ret	60
24	(Netherlands) Dave Kooiker	KTM	11	22	11	11	12	8										19	15	Ret				60
25	(Estonia) Harri Kullas	KTM	Ret	5	Ret	9	11	7																52
26	(Czech Republic) Petr Rathouský	KTM	Ret	30	27							31	20	16	15	11	15	15	12	13	21	DNS	DNS	51
27	(Germany) Mark Scheu	Suzuki	27	23	24	25	Ret	25	21	24	Ret	16	22	19	12	10	12	16	18	Ret	22	22	18	47
28	(Czech Republic) Václav Kovář	KTM	25	21	26							22	Ret	22	10	14	13				15	20	17	37
29	(Sweden) Anton Neidert	Yamaha	23	19	16	21	19	19													10	14	15	35
30	(Spain) Víctor Alonso	Ducati													Ret	6	7							29
31	(Estonia) Gert Krestinov	Honda				19	13	14				13	18	Ret										28
32	(Germany) Vincent Gallwitz	KTM	26	25	23	23	20	18	17	19	19	19	23	18				22	16	16	33	24	20	28
33	(Netherlands) Rick Elzinga	KTM										21	12	6										24
34	(Latvia) Edvards Bidzāns	Ducati													16	22	19	20	14	15				21
35	(Germany) Fynn-Niklas Tornau	KTM	22	20	22	26	26	20	19	21	21	20	21	21	24	24	23	21	20	17	19	Ret	14	19
36	(Germany) Constantin Piller	Yamaha													18	15	Ret				17	17	Ret	17
37	(Switzerland) Valentin Guillod	Yamaha													7	DNS	DNS							14
38	(Netherlands) Lars van Berkel	Yamaha	8	Ret	DNS																			13
39	(Netherlands) Jens Walvoort	KTM	9	Ret	Ret																			12
40	(Belgium) Tom Dukerts	KTM	29	27	29				16	17	18													12
41	(Switzerland) Loris Freidig	Fantic							24	Ret	DNS				22	19	14							9
42	(Sweden) Arvid Lüning	Husqvarna	Ret	26	21																23	18	16	8
43	(Denmark) Glen Meier	Yamaha																			16	25	DNS	5
44	(Belgium) Emile De Baere	Honda	Ret	DNS	DNS																20	19	19	5
45	(Germany) Fabian Kling	Husqvarna	32	34	31	Ret	25	26	Ret	22	Ret				26	27	25	24	23	18	26	26	23	3
46	(Sweden) Leopold Ambjörnsson	Honda				18	Ret	DNS																3
47	(Germany) Leon Rehberg	Triumph				28	30	Ret	29	28	26	33	26	24	25	25	26	23	19	20	Ret	23	21	3
48	(Belgium) Thomas Vermijl	Gas Gas	31	29	32	32	28	24	22	Ret	DNS	25	30	25	31	23	28	25	21	19	25	28	25	2
49	(Belgium) Greg Smets	KTM				30	24	Ret	Ret	20	20							28	24	30				2
50	(Germany) Toni Hoffmann	KTM	Ret	32	Ret				20	25	Ret	26	27	23				27	Ret	21				1
51	(Austria) Marcel Stauffer	KTM	20	Ret	Ret																			1
	(Germany) Marnique Appelt	KTM				24	23	21																0
	(Sweden) Liam Åkerlund	Triumph																			29	21	24	0
	(Switzerland) Ramon Keller	KTM													Ret	21	24							0
	(Germany) Max Bülow	KTM	DNQ	DNQ	Ret	33	29	28	Ret	29	22	29	Ret	DNS	29	28	Ret	31	22	23	Ret	Ret	DNS	0
	(Japan) Yuki Okura	Honda				29	22	23																0
	(Germany) Elias Stapel	Triumph													23	Ret	22							0
	(Norway) Markus Sommerstad	KTM										24	24	26	33	34	33	30	26	25	27	27	22	0
	(Germany) Lukas Fiedler	Husqvarna				35	32	29							35	Ret	DNS	29	25	22	Ret	31	29	0
	(France) Ludovic Macler	Honda							23	27	23													0
	(Belgium) Adrien Wagener	KTM	33	35	28				26	30	24													0
	(South Africa) Jean Visser	Husqvarna													34	30	31	34	27	24				0
	(Belgium) Lars Huysmans	Yamaha																			24	Ret	27	0
	(Sweden) Albin Gerhardsson	Yamaha	24	Ret	DNS																			0
	(Germany) Paul Ullrich	Kawasaki	DNQ	33	Ret	31	27	30	25	33	Ret	27	25	27				33	DNS	26	30	30	Ret	0
	(Czech Republic) Stanislav Vašíček	Gas Gas	DNQ	DNQ	DNQ				27	31	25				27	26	27							0
	(Sweden) Samuel Flink	Yamaha	DNQ	DNQ	DNQ	34	31	27	28	Ret	29	28	Ret	Ret	32	31	32	35	28	29	28	29	26	0
	(Germany) Ben Gosepath	Triumph							30	26	27										35	Ret	DNS	0
	(Germany) Theo Praun	Yamaha													30	29	29	32	29	27				0
	(Germany) Dominik Grau	Yamaha	DNQ	DNQ	DNQ	36	33	31				DNS	DNS	DNS				37	31	28	34	32	28	0
	(Germany) Noel Schmitt	Triumph	DNQ	DNQ	DNQ				32	34	Ret	32	28	30				36	30	31	Ret	Ret	DNS	0
	(Belgium) Nicolas Vennekens	Yamaha	30	28	30																			0
	(Denmark) Kasper Bæk Iversen	Yamaha										30	Ret	28										0
	(France) Axel Billottet	Honda													28	Ret	30							0
	(Switzerland) Flavio Wolf	Yamaha							31	32	28													0
	(Germany) Luca Harms	KTM										35	29	29										0
	(France) Edgard Moncel	Yamaha							34	37	31													0
	(Germany) Tim Kühner	Triumph													DNQ	32	34							0
	(Germany) Fabian Trossen	Husqvarna										Ret	Ret	Ret	DNQ	DNQ	DNQ	38	32	DNS				0
	(Germany) Marvin Pfeffer	KTM	DNQ	DNQ	DNQ				DNQ	DNQ	32													0
	(Austria) Marco Heidegger	Gas Gas													DNQ	33	35							0
	(Germany) Julian Duvier	KTM	34	Ret	DNS																			0
	(Czech Republic) Radim Kraus	KTM													Ret	Ret	Ret							0
	(Germany) Dave Abbing	KTM				Ret	Ret	DNS																0
	(Germany) Justin Trache	Yamaha							Ret	Ret	DNS													0
	(Germany) Marco Fleissig	Yamaha													Ret	DNS	DNS							0
	(Germany) Tobias Linke	Kawasaki										Ret	DNS	DNS										0
	(Germany) Max Benthin	Triumph				Ret	DNS	DNS																0
	(Slovenia) Jure Božnar	KTM				DNQ	DNQ	DNQ							DNQ	DNQ	DNQ							0
	(Sweden) Kewin Palmér	Husqvarna	DNQ	DNQ	DNQ																			0
	(Luxembourg) Damien De Muyser	Honda	DNQ	DNQ	DNQ																			0
	(Germany) Björn Cornels	KTM										DNQ	DNQ	DNQ										0
	(Germany) Robin Schumann	Yamaha													DNQ	DNQ	DNQ							0
Pos	Rider	Bike	GRE (North Rhine-Westphalia)			DRE (Brandenburg)			BIT (France)			TEN (Schleswig-Holstein)			GAI (Baden-Württemberg)			VEL (Mecklenburg-Vorpommern)			FÜR (Brandenburg)			Points

== Youngster Cup ==
=== Participants ===
Team	Constructor	No	Rider	Rounds
MX-Handel Husqvarna Racing	Husqvarna	2	(Denmark) Nicolai Skovbjerg	1–3
MX-Handel Husqvarna Racing	Husqvarna	14	(Estonia) Sebastian Leok	All
MX-Handel Husqvarna Racing	Husqvarna	40	(Estonia) Travis Leok	4
SixtySeven Racing Team	Husqvarna	2	(Denmark) Nicolai Skovbjerg	4–7
SixtySeven Racing Team	KTM	108	(Belgium) Harry Seel	1, 3, 5–6
SixtySeven Racing Team	Husqvarna	408	(Netherlands) Scott Smulders	1–3, 5–7
SixtySeven Racing Team	Husqvarna	473	(Germany) Collin Wohnhas	5
SixtySeven Racing Team	Husqvarna	724	(Netherlands) Jaymian Ramakers	1–6
SixtySeven Racing Team	KTM	919	(Austria) Maximilian Ernecker	1–3, 5
KTM Sarholz Racing Team	Husqvarna	3	(Germany) Linus Jung	All
KTM Sarholz Racing Team	KTM	37	(South Africa) Trey Cox	All
KTM Sarholz Racing Team	KTM	363	(Liechtenstein) Lyonel Reichl	1–4, 6–7
KTM Sarholz Racing Team	KTM	770	(Germany) Leon Rudolph	All
Team Dobbert	Kawasaki	10	(Germany) Lennox Willmann	2, 4
Dörr Motorsport Triumph Racing	Triumph	11	(Spain) Gilen Albisua	6–7
Dörr Motorsport Triumph Racing	Triumph	252	(Germany) Paul Bloy	5
Dörr Motorsport Triumph Racing	Triumph	275	(Germany) Eric Rakow	1–4
Dörr Motorsport Triumph Racing	Triumph	494	(Germany) Maximilian Werner	1
Dörr Motorsport Triumph Racing	Triumph	511	(Germany) Jan Krug	1–5
KMP Honda Racing by DVAG	Honda	13	(Australia) Deacon Paice	5–6
KMP Honda Racing by DVAG	Honda	46	(Germany) Pasquale Di Monaco	1
KMP Honda Racing by DVAG	Honda	100	(Switzerland) Luca Diserens	1, 4–5
KMP Honda Racing by DVAG	Honda	162	(Australia) Ky Woods	2–3
KMP Honda Racing by DVAG	Honda	241	(Germany) Leopold Lichey	1–5
RGS Racing	Husqvarna	17	(Belgium) Junior Bal	All
RGS Racing	KTM	144	(Germany) Devin Möhrke	4
Triumph AQVA Racing	Triumph	23	(Estonia) Romeo Pikand	1–3, 7
Winkle Racing Team/MSC Gaildorf	KTM	24	(Germany) Max Heger	5
KTM GST Berlin Racing	KTM	26	(Germany) Eddy Müller	2, 4
KTM GST Berlin Racing	Husqvarna	332	(Germany) Gustav Busch	2
KTM GST Berlin Racing	KTM	412	(Germany) Nick Sellahn	4, 6
KTM GST Berlin Racing	KTM	438	(Germany) Jan-Erik Kettner	2, 6–7
KTM GST Berlin Racing	KTM	645	(Germany) Richard Stephan	1–2, 4–7
KTM GST Berlin Racing	KTM	921	(Germany) Tim Engelmann	1–3, 5–7
Team MJC Yamaha Monster Energy	Yamaha	26	(New Zealand) Levi Townley	5–6
Team Schmitz	Husqvarna	28	(Germany) Jakob Zweiacker	1, 3, 7
MX For Life Stara Gwardia	KTM	31	(Poland) Damian Zdunek	1–2
Meyer Racing	Yamaha	38	(Germany) Oskar Romberg	All
Schmicker Silve Racing	KTM	41	(Finland) Saku Mansikkamäki	All
Schmicker Silve Racing	KTM	358	(Finland) Nico Stenberg	1–3, 5–6
Sturm STC Racing	Gas Gas	43	(Latvia) Roberts Lūsis	4–7
Werthmann Racing Team by Mefo Sport	KTM	47	(Czech Republic) David Kadleček	3, 5–6
Werthmann Racing Team by Mefo Sport	Gas Gas	49	(Czech Republic) David Widerwill	1, 3, 5–6
Werthmann Racing Team by Mefo Sport	Honda	437	(Czech Republic) Martin Venhoda	1, 3, 5–6
Werthmann Racing Team by Mefo Sport	KTM	467	(Czech Republic) Jakub Zahradník	2–4
	Kawasaki	55	(Germany) Fiete-Joost Radbruch	1–2, 4, 6
Joramo Off-Road Shop	Husqvarna	59	(Belgium) Yoran Moens	3
Mefo Sport Racing Team	Husqvarna	63	(Slovenia) Jaka Peklaj	5
Mefo Sport Racing Team	KTM	110	(Estonia) Richard Paat	1–2, 4–7
MX-Academy Honda Racing by Meuwissen Motorsports	Honda	66	(New Zealand) Jack Ellingham	5–6
MX-Academy Honda Racing by Meuwissen Motorsports	Honda	81	(Belgium) Emile De Baere	2–5
MX-Academy Honda Racing by Meuwissen Motorsports	Honda	747	(South Africa) Jordan van Wyk	2–6
Kosak Racing Team	KTM	70	(Germany) Valentin Kees	1–5, 7
	KTM	71	(Finland) Arttu Sahlstén	1
SHR Motorsports by Hartje	Yamaha	82	(Belgium) Lars Huysmans	6
Motorspeed.no	KTM	89	(Norway) Markus Sommerstad	1
Becker Racing	KTM	105	(Denmark) Lucas Bruhn	1–2, 4–7
Becker Racing	KTM	290	(Germany) Joshua Völker	All
Becker Racing	KTM	404	(Indonesia) Mohammad Zidane	2–3
Becker Racing	Gas Gas	474	(Belgium) Ian Ampoorter	1–5
Becker Racing	Gas Gas	529	(Belgium) Maxime Lucas	1, 5–6
Becker Racing	KTM	963	(Switzerland) Cyril Elsener	5–6
ADAC Hessen-Thüringen MX Rookie Team	KTM	109	(Germany) Oliver Jüngling	1–5
AMX Racing	KTM	116	(Germany) Ben-Lukas Bremser	All
AMX Racing	KTM	140	(United States) Brandon Eade	1–3
AMX Racing	KTM	418	(Czech Republic) Martin Červenka	1–2, 4–5, 7
Team Bloms MX Racing	Husqvarna	117	(Sweden) Otto Gustavsson	2, 7
Kristera Serga Motoklubs	Yamaha	124	(Latvia) Jēkabs Kubuliņš	7
	Husqvarna	126	(France) Loïc Kiffer	3
Motovation Motosports	Husqvarna	128	(Netherlands) Dean Gregoire	7
Motovation Motosports	Husqvarna	199	(Netherlands) Dani Heitink	6
	KTM	134	(Germany) Timm Ziegler	7
	Husqvarna	139	(Germany) Nonni Per Lange	1–2, 4, 6
Cat Moto Bauerschmidt KTM	KTM	141	(Italy) Francesco Bellei	1, 4–5
Cat Moto Bauerschmidt KTM	KTM	265	(Australia) Byron Dennis	5
Cat Moto Bauerschmidt KTM	KTM	304	(Australia) Liam Owens	1–4
Cat Moto Bauerschmidt KTM	KTM	515	(Denmark) Mads Fredsøe	1–5
	Gas Gas	161	(Latvia) Alberts Knapšis	4
MMX Racing Team Luxembourg	Honda	174	(Belgium) Bastien Stommen	1–3
Polned Racing Team	KTM	188	(Netherlands) Rizan Hartman	1
FRT Racing	Triumph	194	(Germany) Jonathan Frank	All
DW Racing	KTM	196	(Germany) Jaden Wendeler	1–2, 4–5
Oppliger Racing	KTM	202	(Switzerland) Ryan Oppliger	6–7
RC Pommes	Yamaha	212	(Germany) Sebastian Holz	5
RC Pommes	Fantic	540	(Germany) Simon Holz	5
MC Mikkola	Honda	213	(France) Alexandre Viltard	4
HTS KTM Racing Team	KTM	214	(Hungary) Bence Pergel	All
Young Motion powered by Resa Racing	KTM	220	(Estonia) Martin Michelis	1
	KTM	221	(Germany) Anthony Caspari	1, 4–7
Auctor MX Team	Honda	223	(Czech Republic) Přemysl Zimek	5
Team MCMB	KTM	225	(France) Nicolas Clément	1, 3, 5
	KTM	234	(Switzerland) Remo Schudel	5
Berlin Bike Connection	Gas Gas	237	(Germany) Lasse Böttcher	2
Turing Insights Racing	Husqvarna	247	(South Africa) Jean Visser	1
Team Motobasis	TM	255	(Germany) Lasse Lohmann	5
Norman KTM Factory Rookies	KTM	292	(Austria) Ricardo Bauer	7
OneForOne Production/Zweiradcenter Umbach	Kawasaki	310	(Germany) Felix Frey	5
Hostettler Yamaha	Yamaha	312	(Switzerland) Noe Zumstein	3, 5
Mitterbäck Racing	Honda	334	(Slovenia) Lukas Osek	5
KTM Switzerland	KTM	337	(Switzerland) Noryn Polsini	3
Burn Out Fahrwerkstechnik	Husqvarna	367	(Germany) Maximilian Schlottke	2
Cat Moto MX	Husqvarna	400	(Netherlands) Roan Tolsma	2, 4
Kop og Kande KBI BYG	KTM	402	(Denmark) Casey Karstrøm	6
	Honda	427	(Netherlands) Mick Kennedy	All
	Triumph	441	(Denmark) Jakob Madsen	5
Triumph Berlin-Mini-X Racing	Triumph	444	(Germany) Leam Mitterhuber	2, 4
	KTM	452	(Italy) Alex Gruber	1–3, 5–6
P&P Racing	Honda	457	(Germany) Paul Neunzling	2, 6
Bells Racing	Honda	461	(Japan) Lukumo Yoshida	2
Osička MX Team	KTM	466	(Czech Republic) Václav Janout	5
	Husqvarna	477	(Netherlands) Guus Oomen	7
Brouwer Motors KTM	KTM	485	(Netherlands) Senna van Voorst	6
Kemco Management	Yamaha	488	(Belgium) Brent Van de Walle	1
Kemco Management	KTM	848	(Netherlands) Anthony Visser	1
Kemco Management	Gas Gas	880	(Netherlands) Sven Dijk	2
MotoproX MRA Racing Team	Husqvarna	499	(Slovakia) Jaroslav Katriňák	1, 4
TYK Team Yamaha Knobloch sponsored by A.T.E.C.	Yamaha	513	(Germany) Hannes Lüders	2–4, 6–7
TYK Team Yamaha Knobloch sponsored by A.T.E.C.	Yamaha	576	(Germany) Joel Franz	1–6
Falcon Motorsports	KTM	518	(Germany) Fritz Greiner	All
HB Motorsport	KTM	526	(Denmark) Jacob Melgaard	1–4, 6–7
SevenSevenSix Racing Team	KTM	543	(Germany) Nick Domann	5–7
Team Ties Pol Motors Gas Gas	Gas Gas	551	(Netherlands) Mike Visser	1, 4
Gabriel SS24 KTM Factory Juniors	KTM	574	(Netherlands) Gyan Doensen	6
Team Rhino Racing	Yamaha	610	(Denmark) Toke Jepsen	4, 6
Team BuyMX Yamaha	Gas Gas	611	(Latvia) Markuss Kokins	1–4
GripMesser Racing Team	Gas Gas	612	(Estonia) Joosep Pärn	2–3, 6
	Husqvarna	701	(Lithuania) Marius Adomaitis	2–7
Motobike Racing Team	KTM	712	(Switzerland) Toni Ziemer	3, 6
KS Performance Austria Racing Team	Fantic	713	(Austria) Jürgen Lehner	1, 3, 5
KM Kaczmarek Motorsport	KTM	725	(Germany) Dominic Bilau	2, 4, 6–7
	Husqvarna	734	(Sweden) Alvin Strömvall	1
Ajo Motorsport	KTM	777	(Finland) Viktor Leppälä	6
Zweiradcenter Umbach	Kawasaki	783	(Germany) Leo Paukovic	5
	Yamaha	845	(Denmark) Emil Gjedde	4
Zweirad Umbach Racing	Kawasaki	857	(France) Hugo Vauthier	3, 5
OneForOne Production	KTM	923	(Germany) Nils Weinmann	5
Eckert Racing Team	TM	954	(Germany) Kjell Maurice Wendt	2, 4, 6
Yamaha Scandinavia	Yamaha	981	(Sweden) Gustav Axelsson	1

=== Riders Championship ===
Pos	Rider	Bike	GRE (North Rhine-Westphalia)			DRE (Brandenburg)			BIT (France)			TEN (Schleswig-Holstein)			GAI (Baden-Württemberg)			VEL (Mecklenburg-Vorpommern)			FÜR (Brandenburg)			Points
1	(Denmark) Nicolai Skovbjerg	Husqvarna	1	8	3	2	2	1	2	1	1	1	1	1	1	1	8	1	3	2	1	1	2	476
2	(Estonia) Sebastian Leok	Husqvarna	9	34	5	4	6	5	12	7	9	3	5	6	2	3	1	6	2	5	3	15	1	334
3	(Finland) Saku Mansikkamäki	KTM	3	4	25	5	4	Ret	Ret	DNS	DNS	2	3	9	3	2	3	7	4	16	2	2	4	287
4	(Netherlands) Scott Smulders	Husqvarna	2	6	1	1	1	10	4	2	2				12	14	9	8	14	4	Ret	DNS	DNS	251
5	(Germany) Valentin Kees	KTM	11	22	7	7	3	8	3	6	6	6	7	13	4	Ret	DNS				5	6	6	222
6	(Liechtenstein) Lyonel Reichl	KTM	4	5	6	10	5	3	6	5	11	12	14	DNS				Ret	9	10	4	11	5	220
7	(Denmark) Mads Fredsøe	KTM	5	3	8	3	8	2	1	3	Ret	5	2	3	Ret	DNS	DNS							207
8	(Australia) Liam Owens	KTM	15	1	2	8	12	6	5	4	5	4	8	2										193
9	(Germany) Jan Krug	Triumph	6	2	4	9	7	4	13	Ret	3	13	6	4	DNQ	DNQ	DNQ							168
10	(Finland) Nico Stenberg	KTM	24	7	16	13	10	7	8	9	4				Ret	15	11	5	5	3				163
11	(Germany) Linus Jung	Husqvarna	16	16	9	14	21	15	15	11	8	11	24	Ret	19	16	6	11	18	7	9	8	9	160
12	(Hungary) Bence Pergel	KTM	Ret	26	19	19	13	19	9	17	10	14	4	7	11	9	12	14	8	24	11	13	13	157
13	(Germany) Leon Rudolph	KTM	17	9	21	25	14	18	22	10	17	32	9	25	13	5	10	29	10	19	Ret	10	10	123
14	(Lithuania) Marius Adomaitis	Husqvarna				23	11	22	14	13	15	9	10	5	6	20	7	12	29	21	17	19	17	119
15	(Austria) Maximilian Ernecker	KTM	18	12	13	6	9	21	11	8	14				16	7	19							98
16	(Denmark) Lucas Bruhn	KTM	25	Ret	DNS	28	17	13				21	11	8	15	Ret	22	13	11	9	12	14	12	96
17	(Estonia) Richard Paat	KTM	19	19	12	11	18	28				15	20	18	20	23	Ret	26	19	8	14	7	3	93
18	(Latvia) Markuss Kokins	Gas Gas	7	18	15	12	Ret	14	10	12	7	Ret	19	Ret										75
19	(Denmark) Jacob Melgaard	KTM	23	20	28	Ret	15	11	17	Ret	21	8	Ret	10				Ret	35	25	7	12	16	73
20	(Netherlands) Gyan Doensen	KTM																2	1	1				72
21	(Germany) Jonathan Frank	Triumph	10	13	10	17	28	Ret	Ret	Ret	25	20	25	Ret	DNQ	DNQ	DNQ	16	26	14	15	17	14	64
22	(Belgium) Junior Bal	Husqvarna	13	14	20	32	16	9	7	Ret	20	10	22	Ret	34	Ret	DNS	27	17	28	23	28	Ret	63
23	(Belgium) Ian Ampoorter	Gas Gas	8	10	14	21	24	12	18	30	16	38	18	30	22	19	17							57
24	(Australia) Byron Dennis	KTM													5	4	2							56
25	(Switzerland) Ryan Oppliger	KTM																4	7	6	13	21	Ret	55
26	(Germany) Oskar Romberg	Yamaha	34	31	32	37	29	Ret	29	26	24	27	12	12	14	10	18	20	34	13	20	18	18	55
27	(South Africa) Trey Cox	KTM	14	35	17	22	31	30	19	14	28	22	13	15	18	17	26	17	23	12	DNS	DNS	DNS	54
28	(Czech Republic) David Widerwill	Gas Gas	27	15	29				24	21	18				9	11	5	21	16	Ret				52
29	(Latvia) Jēkabs Kubuliņš	Yamaha																			6	4	7	47
30	(Netherlands) Dean Gregoire	Husqvarna																			8	5	11	39
31	(Netherlands) Mick Kennedy	Honda	26	21	30	26	27	25	31	Ret	33	24	29	23	30	Ret	20							37
31	(Netherlands) Mick Kennedy	Yamaha																9	24	11	19	9	DNS	37
32	(Germany) Eric Rakow	Triumph	12	11	22	20	26	20	Ret	15	19	36	17	17										37
33	(Austria) Ricardo Bauer	KTM																			22	3	8	33
34	(Finland) Viktor Leppälä	KTM																10	6	15				32
35	(Czech Republic) Václav Janout	KTM													23	8	4							31
36	(Italy) Francesco Bellei	KTM	Ret	DNS	DNS							31	23	26	7	6	DNS							29
37	(Switzerland) Luca Diserens	Honda	Ret	DNS	DNS							26	Ret	DNS	8	12	14							29
38	(Netherlands) Roan Tolsma	Husqvarna				18	23	16				7	15	21										28
39	(Belgium) Emile De Baere	Honda				16	25	Ret	16	16	Ret	19	21	11	27	32	DNS							27
40	(Latvia) Roberts Lūsis	Gas Gas										16	26	22	17	26	16	22	27	22	10	22	Ret	25
41	(Germany) Ben-Lukas Bremser	KTM	35	30	23	30	37	32	20	20	26	17	Ret	14	DNQ	DNQ	DNQ	31	12	23	21	Ret	20	23
42	(New Zealand) Levi Townley	Yamaha													DNQ	DNQ	DNQ	3	Ret	DNS				20
43	(Estonia) Romeo Pikand	Triumph	32	24	11	27	19	17	Ret	19	23										27	24	19	20
44	(Germany) Fritz Greiner	KTM	33	37	DNS	Ret	34	Ret	Ret	DNS	DNS	33	27	19	36	21	15	15	15	26	26	Ret	DNS	20
45	(Switzerland) Remo Schudel	KTM													10	Ret	13							19
46	(Estonia) Joosep Pärn	Gas Gas				33	22	26	21	18	12							23	21	17				16
47	(Netherlands) Guus Oomen	Husqvarna																			16	16	15	16
48	(Germany) Richard Stephan	KTM	DNQ	DNQ	DNQ	15	20	24				18	Ret	Ret	33	29	Ret	25	20	20	18	20	21	16
49	(Spain) Gilen Albisua	Triumph																19	13	18	25	Ret	DNS	13
50	(Belgium) Harry Seel	KTM	36	33	26				26	DNS	DNS				21	13	27	34	22	30				8
51	(Australia) Ky Woods	Honda				DNQ	DNQ	DNQ	Ret	24	13													8
52	(Belgium) Maxime Lucas	Gas Gas	21	17	27										24	18	Ret	28	28	37				7
53	(Estonia) Travis Leok	Husqvarna										30	16	20										6
54	(Germany) Joshua Völker	KTM	30	27	24	24	33	23	23	23	22	25	28	16	DNQ	DNQ	23	DNQ	DNQ	32	24	26	22	5
55	(Finland) Arttu Sahlstén	KTM	20	23	18																			4
56	(Netherlands) Dani Heitink	Husqvarna																18	Ret	Ret				3
	(Germany) Paul Bloy	Triumph													26	25	21							0
	(Germany) Collin Wohnhas	Husqvarna													38	22	24							0
	(South Africa) Jordan van Wyk	Honda				34	35	29	Ret	22	30	29	32	27	DNQ	DNQ	DNQ	32	30	Ret				0
	(Germany) Maximilian Werner	Triumph	22	DNS	DNS																			0
	(Germany) Tim Engelmann	KTM	DNQ	DNQ	DNQ	DNQ	DNQ	DNQ	Ret	34	29				DNQ	DNQ	DNQ	DNQ	DNQ	DNQ	30	25	23	0
	(Germany) Nick Domann	KTM													DNQ	DNQ	DNQ	35	31	31	29	23	26	0
	(Netherlands) Jaymian Ramakers	Husqvarna	31	29	Ret	29	30	27	DNQ	DNQ	DNQ	23	30	28	DNQ	DNQ	DNQ	DNQ	DNQ	DNQ				0
	(Germany) Jakob Zweiacker	Husqvarna	Ret	32	Ret				27	27	Ret										Ret	32	24	0
	(Netherlands) Mike Visser	Gas Gas	DNQ	DNQ	DNQ							28	31	24										0
	(Czech Republic) David Kadleček	KTM							DNQ	DNQ	DNQ				DNQ	DNQ	DNQ	24	32	29				0
	(Slovenia) Jaka Peklaj	Husqvarna													31	24	Ret							0
	(Czech Republic) Martin Červenka	KTM	DNQ	DNQ	DNQ	DNQ	DNQ	DNQ				34	Ret	33	37	30	25				32	27	25	0
	(Czech Republic) Martin Venhoda	Honda	DNQ	DNQ	DNQ				25	25	31				35	33	Ret	DNQ	DNQ	DNQ				0
	(Switzerland) Cyril Elsener	KTM													25	Ret	Ret	Ret	25	34				0
	(Slovakia) Jaroslav Katriňák	Husqvarna	28	25	31							Ret	DNS	DNS										0
	(Australia) Deacon Paice	Honda													29	28	Ret	Ret	Ret	27				0
	(Germany) Oliver Jüngling	KTM	DNQ	DNQ	DNQ	DNQ	DNQ	DNQ	28	29	27	DNQ	DNQ	DNQ	DNQ	DNQ	DNQ							0
	(Germany) Anthony Caspari	KTM	DNQ	DNQ	DNQ							DNQ	DNQ	DNQ	DNQ	DNQ	DNQ	DNQ	DNQ	DNQ	31	29	27	0
	(Sweden) Otto Gustavsson	Husqvarna				31	32	31													28	30	Ret	0
	(Germany) Dominic Bilau	KTM				DNQ	DNQ	DNQ				DNQ	DNQ	DNQ				DNQ	DNQ	DNQ	33	31	28	0
	(Austria) Jürgen Lehner	Fantic	DNQ	DNQ	DNQ				Ret	33	34				DNQ	DNQ	28							0
	(Germany) Leo Paukovic	Kawasaki													28	Ret	DNS							0
	(Estonia) Martin Michelis	KTM	DNQ	28	Ret																			0
	(Germany) Jaden Wendeler	KTM	DNQ	DNQ	DNQ	DNQ	DNQ	DNQ				35	34	32	32	31	29							0
	(Denmark) Toke Jepsen	Yamaha										37	33	29				DNQ	DNQ	DNQ				0
	(Germany) Pasquale Di Monaco	Honda	29	36	DNS																			0
	(Czech Republic) Jakub Zahradník	KTM				DNQ	DNQ	DNQ	30	32	32	DNQ	DNQ	DNQ										0
	(Netherlands) Senna van Voorst	KTM																30	Ret	33				0
	(Italy) Alex Gruber	KTM	DNQ	DNQ	DNQ	Ret	DNS	35	DNQ	31	Ret				DNQ	DNQ	DNQ	DNQ	DNQ	DNQ				0
	(France) Alexandre Viltard	Honda										DNQ	DNQ	31										0
	(Netherlands) Sven Dijk	Gas Gas				35	39	33																0
	(Denmark) Casey Karstrøm	KTM																33	Ret	35				0
	(New Zealand) Jack Ellingham	Honda													DNQ	DNQ	DNQ	Ret	33	DNS				0
	(Germany) Lennox Willmann	Kawasaki				DNQ	DNQ	DNQ				DNQ	35	34										0
	(Germany) Gustav Busch	Husqvarna				36	36	34																0
	(Germany) Hannes Lüders	Yamaha				DNQ	DNQ	DNQ	DNQ	35	Ret	DNQ	DNQ	DNQ				DNQ	DNQ	DNQ	DNS	DNS	DNS	0
	(Germany) Paul Neunzling	Honda				DNQ	DNQ	DNQ										DNQ	DNQ	36				0
	(Germany) Jan-Erik Kettner	KTM				DNQ	38	DNQ										DNQ	DNQ	DNQ	Ret	DNS	DNS	0
	(Sweden) Gustav Axelsson	Yamaha	DNS	38	DNS																			0
	(Germany) Timm Ziegler	KTM																			DNS	Ret	DNS	0
	(Germany) Joel Franz	Yamaha	DNQ	DNQ	DNQ	DNQ	DNQ	DNQ	DNQ	DNQ	DNQ	DNQ	DNQ	DNQ	DNQ	DNQ	DNQ	DNQ	DNQ	DNQ				0
	(Germany) Leopold Lichey	Honda	DNQ	DNQ	DNQ	DNQ	DNQ	DNQ	DNQ	DNQ	DNQ	DNQ	DNQ	DNQ	DNQ	DNQ	DNQ							0
	(Germany) Nonni Per Lange	Husqvarna	DNQ	DNQ	DNQ	DNQ	DNQ	DNQ				DNQ	DNQ	DNQ				DNQ	DNQ	DNQ				0
	(Germany) Fiete-Joost Radbruch	Kawasaki	DNQ	DNQ	DNQ	DNQ	DNQ	DNQ				DNQ	DNQ	DNQ				DNQ	DNQ	DNQ				0
	(Belgium) Bastien Stommen	Honda	DNQ	DNQ	DNQ	DNQ	DNQ	DNQ	DNQ	DNQ	DNQ													0
	(United States) Brandon Eade	KTM	DNQ	DNQ	DNQ	DNQ	DNQ	DNQ	DNQ	DNQ	DNQ													0
	(France) Nicolas Clément	KTM	DNQ	DNQ	DNQ				DNQ	DNQ	DNQ				DNQ	DNQ	DNQ							0
	(Germany) Kjell Maurice Wendt	TM				DNQ	DNQ	DNQ				DNQ	DNQ	DNQ				DNQ	DNQ	DNQ				0
	(Poland) Damian Zdunek	KTM	DNQ	DNQ	DNQ	DNQ	DNQ	DNQ																0
	(Indonesia) Mohammad Zidane	KTM				DNQ	DNQ	DNQ	DNQ	DNQ	DNQ													0
	(Germany) Eddy Müller	KTM				DNQ	DNQ	DNQ				DNQ	DNQ	DNQ										0
	(Germany) Leam Mitterhuber	Triumph				DNQ	DNQ	DNQ				DNQ	DNQ	DNQ										0
	(France) Hugo Vauthier	Kawasaki							DNQ	DNQ	DNQ				DNQ	DNQ	DNQ							0
	(Switzerland) Noe Zumstein	Yamaha							DNQ	DNQ	DNQ				DNQ	DNQ	DNQ							0
	(Switzerland) Toni Ziemer	KTM							DNQ	DNQ	DNQ							DNQ	DNQ	DNQ				0
	(Germany) Nick Sellahn	KTM										DNQ	DNQ	DNQ				DNQ	DNQ	DNQ				0
	(Belgium) Brent Van de Walle	Yamaha	DNQ	DNQ	DNQ																			0
	(Netherlands) Rizan Hartman	KTM	DNQ	DNQ	DNQ																			0
	(Netherlands) Anthony Visser	KTM	DNQ	DNQ	DNQ																			0
	(Norway) Markus Sommerstad	KTM	DNQ	DNQ	DNQ																			0
	(South Africa) Jean Visser	Husqvarna	DNQ	DNQ	DNQ																			0
	(Sweden) Alvin Strömvall	Husqvarna	DNQ	DNQ	DNQ																			0
	(Japan) Lukumo Yoshida	Honda				DNQ	DNQ	DNQ																0
	(Germany) Maximilian Schlottke	Husqvarna				DNQ	DNQ	DNQ																0
	(Germany) Lasse Böttcher	Gas Gas				DNQ	DNQ	DNQ																0
	(Belgium) Yoran Moens	Husqvarna							DNQ	DNQ	DNQ													0
	(Switzerland) Noryn Polsini	KTM							DNQ	DNQ	DNQ													0
	(France) Loïc Kiffer	Husqvarna							DNQ	DNQ	DNQ													0
	(Germany) Devin Möhrke	KTM										DNQ	DNQ	DNQ										0
	(Latvia) Alberts Knapšis	Gas Gas										DNQ	DNQ	DNQ										0
	(Denmark) Emil Gjedde	Yamaha										DNQ	DNQ	DNQ										0
	(Czech Republic) Přemysl Zimek	Honda													DNQ	DNQ	DNQ							0
	(Germany) Nils Weinmann	KTM													DNQ	DNQ	DNQ							0
	(Germany) Lasse Lohmann	TM													DNQ	DNQ	DNQ							0
	(Slovenia) Lukas Osek	Honda													DNQ	DNQ	DNQ							0
	(Denmark) Jakob Madsen	Triumph													DNQ	DNQ	DNQ							0
	(Germany) Felix Frey	Kawasaki													DNQ	DNQ	DNQ							0
	(Germany) Sebastian Holz	Yamaha													DNQ	DNQ	DNQ							0
	(Germany) Max Heger	KTM													DNQ	DNQ	DNQ							0
	(Germany) Simon Holz	Fantic													DNQ	DNQ	DNQ							0
	(Belgium) Lars Huysmans	Yamaha																DNQ	DNQ	DNQ				0
Pos	Rider	Bike	GRE (North Rhine-Westphalia)			DRE (Brandenburg)			BIT (France)			TEN (Schleswig-Holstein)			GAI (Baden-Württemberg)			VEL (Mecklenburg-Vorpommern)			FÜR (Brandenburg)			Points
