= ADAC MX Masters =

German Motocross Championship

- ADAC MX Masters Logo
- Category: Motocross
- Country: Germany
- Inaugural season: 2005

The ADAC MX Masters is the premier domestic German Motocross series, organised by the Allgemeiner Deutscher Automobil-Club.

The series runs annually throughout spring and summer, typically consisting of 7-8 rounds. Although the series exists as the premier championship for the sport in Germany, it has also in taken in rounds in several neighbouring European countries over the years.

The premier class within the championship is the MX Masters class but there are also three other classes that act as a ladder for younger riders to move up the ranks.

== History ==
Prior to the beginning of the ADAC MX Masters, the International German Motocross Championship existed as the highest level of the sport in Germany in various forms since the early 1950s. As a reaction to difficult conditions for the sport within the county, ADAC Sports President Hermann Tomczyk along with Dieter Porsch and former racer Dietmar Lacher founded the series.

The Youngster Cup division was introduced in the second year of the championship for riders under the age of 21, with Junior class for 85cc machines brought in 2018. Dennis Ullrich and Max Nagl are the most successful riders in the championships history with five titles each. Internationally notable riders such as Ken Roczen, Jordi Tixier, Pauls Jonass, Glenn Coldenhoff, Jett Lawrence and Simon Längenfelder have all picked up titles across the divisions of the series. Multi-time Grand Prix winner Max Nagl has picked up five titles in the premier Masters class and is notable for having a fourteen-year gap between his second and third crowns.

== Event Format ==
Rounds of the ADAC MX Masters typically have a two-day format. Qualifying sessions for all classes are held on the Saturday along with last chance races for classes with the number of entries that require this. In addition, the opening races for some of the classes are held on Saturday afternoon. The Masters and Youngster Cup classes have three races across the weekend, with the remaining classes having two races.

Points are awarded to finishers of the main races, in the following format:

| Position | 1st | 2nd | 3rd | 4th | 5th | 6th | 7th | 8th | 9th | 10th | 11th | 12th | 13th | 14th | 15th | 16th | 17th | 18th | 19th | 20th |
| Points | 25 | 22 | 20 | 18 | 16 | 15 | 14 | 13 | 12 | 11 | 10 | 9 | 8 | 7 | 6 | 5 | 4 | 3 | 2 | 1 |

== Broadcast ==
The comprehensive broadcast of each round of the ADAC MX Masters is currently via a live stream on the ADAC Motorsports official YouTube channel.

== List of Champions ==
| Season | Masters Champion | Youngster Cup Champion | Junior Cup 125 Champion | Junior Cup 85 Champion |
|---|---|---|---|---|
| 2026 | (Netherlands) Roan van de Moosdijk (KTM) | (Denmark) Nicolai Skovbjerg (Husqvarna) | (Estonia) Lucas Leok (KTM) | (Latvia) Martins Cīrulis (Husqvarna) |
| 2025 | (Netherlands) Roan van de Moosdijk (KTM) | (Denmark) Mads Fredsøe (Husqvarna) | (Belgium) Ian Ampoorter (Gas Gas) | (Estonia) Lucas Leok (KTM) |
| 2024 | (Germany) Max Nagl (Honda) | (Switzerland) Nico Greutmann (Husqvarna) | (Austria) Maximilian Ernecker (Gas Gas) | (Switzerland) Ryan Oppliger (KTM) |
| 2023 | (Germany) Max Nagl (Honda) | (Spain) Oriol Oliver (KTM) | (Denmark) Mads Fredsøe (KTM) | (Netherlands) Dani Heitink (Husqvarna) |
| 2022 | (Germany) Max Nagl (Husqvarna) | (Spain) Guillem Farrés (KTM) | (Latvia) Jānis Reišulis (KTM) | (Netherlands) Jayson van Drunen (Yamaha) |
| 2021 | (France) Jordi Tixier (KTM) | (Austria) Marcel Stauffer (KTM) | (Netherlands) Scott Smulders (Husqvarna) | (Czech Republic) Vítězslav Marek (KTM) |
| 2020 | (France) Jordi Tixier (KTM) | (Germany) Maximilian Spies (Husqvarna) | (Czech Republic) Martin Venhoda (KTM) | (Netherlands) Bradley Mesters (Kawasaki) |
| 2019 | (Germany) Dennis Ullrich (Husqvarna) | (Austria) Rene Hofer (KTM) | (Germany) Simon Längenfelder (KTM) | (Latvia) Edvards Bidzāns (Husqvarna) |
| 2018 | (Germany) Henry Jacobi (Husqvarna) | (Australia) Jett Lawrence (Suzuki) | (Sweden) Filip Olsson (Husqvarna) | (South Africa) Camden McLellan (KTM) |
| | | | Junior Cup Champion | |
| 2017 | (Germany) Dennis Ullrich (KTM) | (Germany) Tom Koch (KTM) | (Denmark) Magnus Smith (KTM) | - |
| 2016 | (Germany) Dennis Ullrich (KTM) | (Netherlands) Bas Vaessen (Suzuki) | (Austria) Rene Hofer (KTM) | - |
| 2015 | (Netherlands) Glenn Coldenhoff (Suzuki) | (Germany) Brian Hsu (Suzuki) | (Germany) Jeremy Sydow (KTM) | - |
| 2014 | (Germany) Dennis Ullrich (KTM) | (Denmark) Thomas Kjær Olsen (Yamaha) | (Denmark) Mikkel Haarup (KTM) | - |
| 2013 | (Germany) Dennis Ullrich (KTM) | (France) Boris Maillard (Kawasaki) | (Denmark) Glen Meier (KTM) | - |
| 2012 | (Germany) Marcus Schiffer (Suzuki) | (Switzerland) Jeremy Seewer (Suzuki) | (Netherlands) Bas Vaessen (KTM) | - |
| 2011 | (Austria) Günter Schmidinger (Honda) | (Denmark) Stefan Kjær Olsen (Yamaha) | (Latvia) Pauls Jonass (KTM) | - |
| 2010 | (Germany) Ken Roczen (Suzuki) | (Germany) Dennis Ullrich (Honda) | (Netherlands) Luca Nijenhuis (Yamaha) | - |
| 2009 | (Germany) Ken Roczen (Suzuki) | (Germany) Dennis Baudrexl (Honda) | (Belgium) Brent Van Doninck (KTM) | - |
| 2008 | (Germany) Max Nagl (KTM) | (Germany) Ken Roczen (Suzuki) | (Netherlands) Jeffrey Herlings (Suzuki) | - |
| 2007 | (Germany) Marcus Schiffer (KTM) | (Czech Republic) Petr Smitka (Yamaha) | (Russia) Aleksandr Tonkov (Suzuki) | - |
| 2006 | (Germany) Max Nagl (KTM) | (Austria) Günter Schmidinger (Honda) | (Germany) Ken Roczen (Suzuki) | - |
| 2005 | (Belgium) Ken De Dycker (Honda) | - | (Netherlands) Ceriel Klein Kromhof (Honda) | - |
