= Roan van de Moosdijk =

Dutch motocross racer

- Nationality: Dutch
- Born: 9 October 2000 (age 26); Eindhoven, Netherlands
- Current team: KTM Kosak Team
- Bike number: 39

Roan van de Moosdijk (born 9 October 2000) is a Dutch professional Motocross racer. Van de Moosdijk made his debut in the Motocross World Championship in 2017 and competed in the MX2 class until the end of 2023.

He was the 2019 European Motocross Champion in the EMX250 class.

In 2025, Van de Moosdijk became only the second Dutch rider to win the main MX Masters class within the ADAC MX Masters championship. He was able to successfully defend his title in 2026, becoming a back-to-back champion in the German-based series.

Van de Moosdijk has represented his country at the 2021 and 2026 editions of the Motocross des Nations. In both events, the Dutch team has finished on the overall podium.

== Career ==
=== Junior career ===
Van de Moosdijk competed internationally during his junior career. In 2013, he was able to finish tenth overall in the EMX85 class of the European Motocross Championship. That season, he also competed for the first time in the FIM Motocross Junior World Championship. In 2014, Van de Moosdijk was one of the leading 85cc riders in Europe. At the European Championship, he was able to secure pole position in the class before finishing second overall behind Jago Geerts. At that season's Junior World Championship, he finished eleventh overall after recording the fastest time in his qualifying group.

Van de Moosdijk moved up to the EMX125 class for 2015, competing as a privateer with a best race finish of eleventh. This was backed up by two points scoring finishes at the Junior World Championship. These performances were enough for him to be signed by DP19 Yamaha team for 2016. Van de Moosdijk was able to finish third overall at the opening round and would have a final championship finish of fifth. The 2016 Junior World Championship was held in Russia and Van de Moosdijk distinguished himself by finishing second overall, after picking pole position along with the win in the opening race.

=== 250 Career ===
Van de Moosdijk moved up to the EMX250 class during the 2017 European Motocross Championship, but could only compete in three rounds due to injury. In addition to these three rounds, he made his Grand Prix debut, riding in the Czech and Belgian rounds of the 2017 FIM Motocross World Championship in the MX2 class. He was retained by the same team for the 2018 season and was able to be a consistent figure at the front of the field. He picked up his first class overall podium at the sixth round, before following that up with his first overall win in Ottobiano a week later. Two more podiums followed this, enabling him to finish third in the final championship standings.

2019 saw Van de Moosdijk move both teams and manufacturers, stepping across to the F&H Kawasaki team. This would see him come away with the EMX250 title, picking up six race wins and three overall victories along the way. Despite this, it was a closely fought championship battle, with van de Moosdijk prevailing by six points over Stephen Rubini who was himself five points ahead of Alberto Forato. On the back of this, he had three notable performances as a wildcard in the MX2 class of the 2019 FIM Motocross World Championship. At the Turkish round, a third place in race two was enough for an overall podium.

Staying with the same team, Van de Moosdijk made his full-time world championship-level debut in 2020. By the third round, he was able to finish on the podium, picking up second overall in Latvia. He picked up a further four overall podiums throughout the season, as well as his first World Championship-level race win in race two at the third Lommel round, on his way to seventh in the final standings. Remaining with F&H Kawasaki for the 2021 FIM Motocross World Championship, Van de Moosdijk picked up a handful of third-place race finishes at the start of the season, before a broken scaphoid derailed his campaign. Despite this he did return to compete for his country at the 2021 Motocross des Nations, helping them finish second overall.

Van de Moosdijk was signed up on a two-year deal by the Rockstar Energy Husqvarna team, starting in the 2022 FIM Motocross World Championship. A shoulder injury sustained at the second round of the season saw him miss all but the final five Grand Prix, of which he was able to pick up one overall podium. The 2023 FIM Motocross World Championship would be Van de Moosdijk's final season in the MX2 category due to the under-23 rule. He had a strong start to the season, culminating in winning the opening race at the third round in Switzerland. This was only his second world championship-level race win and his first since the 2020 season. He was able to take two overall podiums in Portugal and Latvia, before winning the Saturday qualifying race in Germany. A broken collarbone at the Czech round meant that he missed the following three rounds and would eventually finish eighth overall in the championship standings. Domestically, he finished his final season on a 250 by finishing runner-up in the 2023 Dutch Masters of Motocross series behind teammate Kay de Wolf.

=== 450 Career ===
For his first season on a 450, Van de Moosdijk was signed by the Fantic Factory Racing MXGP team to race a full campaign in the MXGP class of the 2024 FIM Motocross World Championship. After picking up a slight knee injury pre-season, Van de Moosdijk and the Fantic Factory team parted ways. Shortly afterwards, he signed for Honda's factory MXGP team, Team HRC, to replace the injured Rubén Fernández from round three onwards. However, Van de Moosdijk continued to be hampered by his pre-season knee injury and after two rounds with no points scored, Team HRC parted company with him. Following further recovery time, van de Moosdijk signed for the KTM Kosak Team to focus on the 2024 ADAC MX Masters series from the fifth round onwards.

Sticking with the Germany-based Kosak team meant that Van de Moosdijk competed in the European rounds of the 2025 FIM Motocross World Championship only. Despite this, his results were still good enough for twentieth in the final standings, with two top-ten race finishes being the highlight of the campaign. In the 2025 ADAC MX Masters, Van de Moosdijk battled veteran reigning champion Max Nagl throughout the season. During the closely fought end to the championship, where the championship lead swapped between the two several times, he was able to come out on top and take the MX Masters title. Van de Moosdijk took in less MXGP rounds in 2026 but made his debut on American soil, where he competed in two rounds of the 2026 AMA National Motocross Championship. Despite only competing in seven rounds, van de Moosdijk again finished twentieth in the final MXGP standings, with an eighth overall at his home round being the standout result. In the 2026 ADAC MX Masters, van de Moosdijk only finished one race outside of the top-two places and won three of the eight overall rounds, to become back-to-back champion in the MX Masters category. With injuries hitting other riders van de Moosdijk was called up for his second appearance representing The Netherlands at the 2026 Motocross des Nations. Riding in the MXGP class, he finished tenth in his qualifying race and ninth in the first main race, with the team ending the event in third overall.

== Honours ==
European Motocross Championship

- EMX250: 2019 (gold) , 2018 (bronze)
- EMX85: 2014 (silver)

ADAC MX Masters

- MX Masters: 2025 & 2026 (gold)

Dutch Masters of Motocross

- 250cc: 2023 (silver) , 2019 (bronze)

== Career statistics ==
=== Motocross des Nations ===
Year	Location	Nation	Class	Teammates	Team Overall	Individual Overall
2021	(Italy) Mantua	NED	MX2	Glenn Coldenhoff; Jeffrey Herlings	2nd	7th
2026	(France) Ernée	NED	MXGP	Glenn Coldenhoff; Jeffrey Herlings	3rd	8th

=== FIM Motocross World Championship ===
==== By season ====
Season	Class	Number	Motorcycle	Team	Race	Race Wins	Overall Wins	Race Top-3	Overall Podium	Pts	Plcd
2017	MX2	39	Yamaha	ASTES4-TESAR Yamaha	3	0	0	0	0	0	-
2019	MX2	39	Kawasaki	F&H Racing Team	6	0	0	1	1	74	26th
2020	MX2	39	Kawasaki	F&H Kawasaki MX2 Racing Team	34	1	0	9	5	466	7th
2021	MX2	39	Kawasaki	F&H Racing Team	17	0	0	3	0	190	17th
2022	MX2	39	Husqvarna	Nestaan Husqvarna Factory Racing	14	0	0	2	1	214	13th
2023	MX2	39	Husqvarna	Nestaan Husqvarna Factory Racing	32	1	0	6	2	560	8th
2024	MXGP	39	Honda	Team HRC	2	0	0	0	0	0	N/A
2025	MXGP	39	KTM	KTM Kosak Team	28	0	0	0	0	168	20th
2026	MXGP	39	KTM	KTM Kosak Team	14	0	0	0	0	117	20th
Total					150	2	0	21	9	1789	

=== AMA National Motocross Championship ===
==== By season ====
Season	Class	Number	Motorcycle	Team	Races	Race Wins	Overall Wins	Race Top-3	Overall Podium	Pts	Plcd
2026	450	939	KTM	KTM Kosak Team	4	0	0	0	0	26	30th
Total					4	0	0	0	0	26	
