= Vellahn =

- Municipality
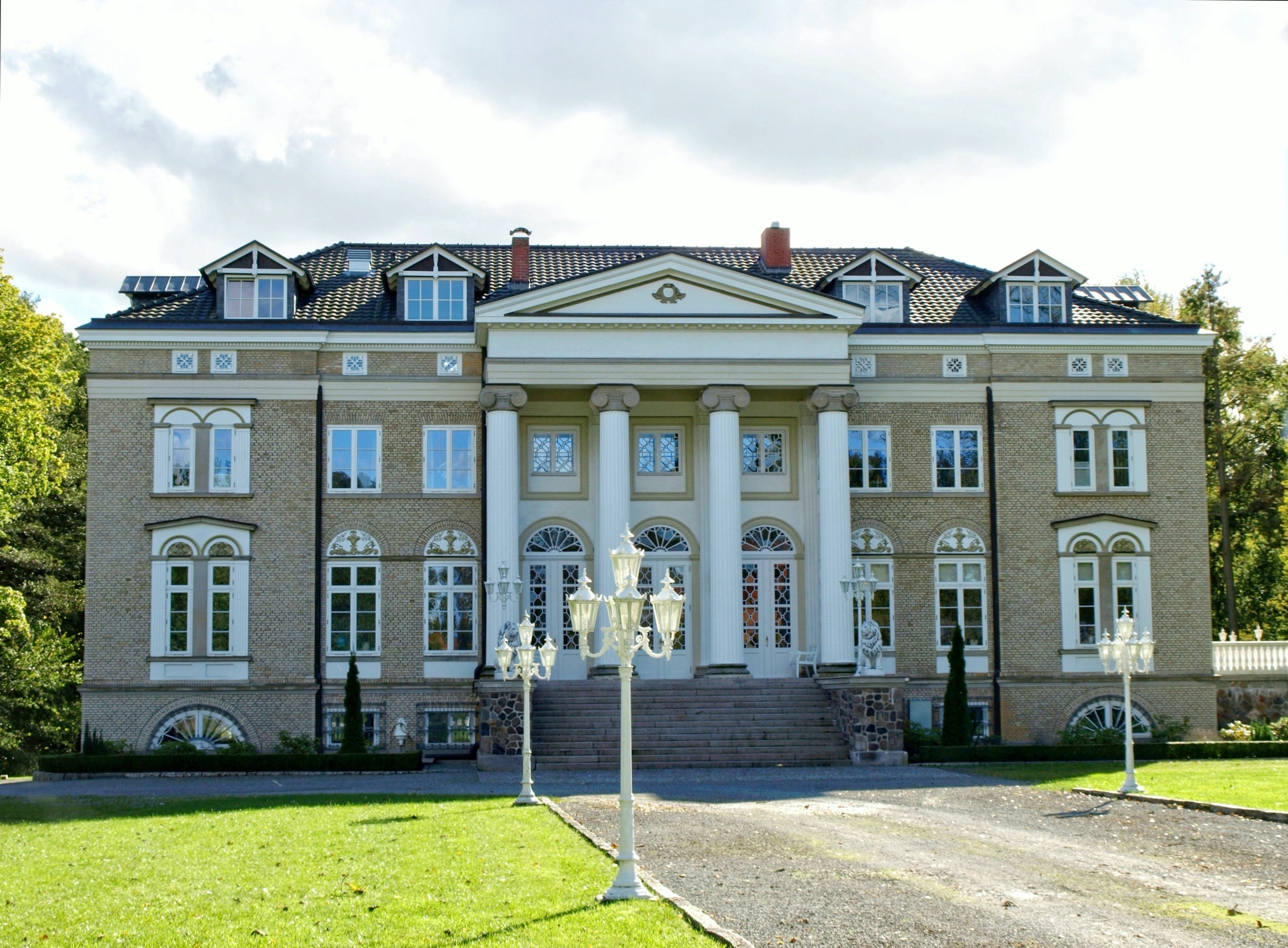
- Herrenhaus Tüschow in Vellahn

- Location of Vellahn within Ludwigslust-Parchim district
- Interactive map of Vellahn
- Location within Germany Location within Mecklenburg-Vorpommern
- Coordinates: 53°23′N 10°58′E
- Country: Germany
- State: Mecklenburg-Vorpommern
- District: Ludwigslust-Parchim
- Municipal assoc.: Zarrentin
- Subdivisions: 7

Government
  - Mayor: Horst Geistlinger

Area
  - Total: 106.48 km^{2} (41.11 sq mi)
- Elevation: 44 m (144 ft)

Population (2025-12-31)
  - Total: 2,706
  - Density: 25.41/km^{2} (65.82/sq mi)
- Time zone: UTC+01:00 (CET)
  - Summer (DST): UTC+02:00 (CEST)
- Postal codes: 19260
- Dialling codes: 038848
- Vehicle registration: LWL
- Website: www.zarrentin.de

Vellahn is a municipality in the Ludwigslust-Parchim district, located in Mecklenburg-Vorpommern, Germany.
