= Gaildorf =

- Town
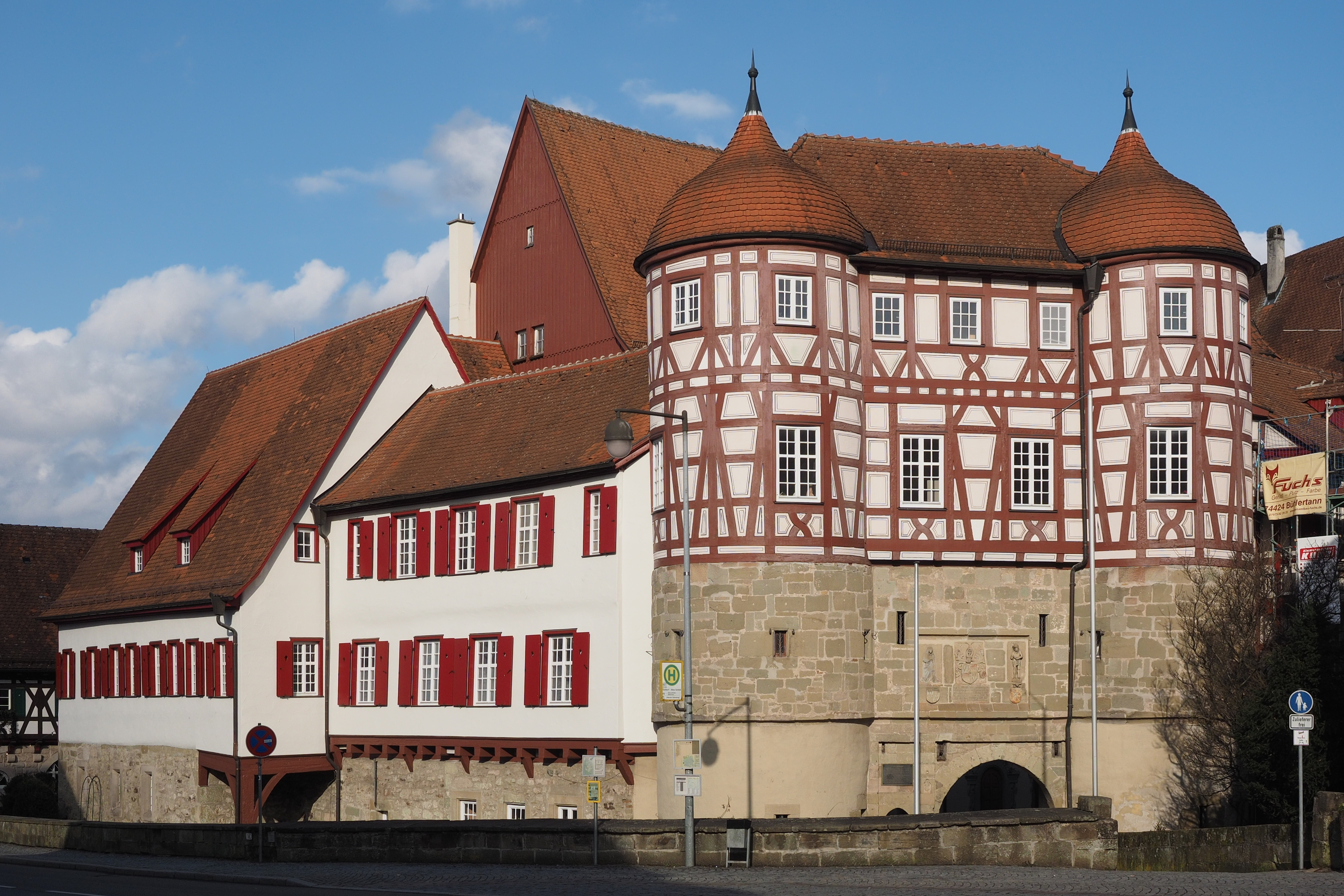
- The Old Castle in Gaildorf

- Coat of arms

- Location of Gaildorf within Schwäbisch Hall district
- Interactive map of Gaildorf
- Location within Germany Location within Baden-Württemberg
- Coordinates: 49°0′N 9°46′E
- Country: Germany
- State: Baden-Württemberg
- Admin. region: Stuttgart
- District: Schwäbisch Hall
- Subdivisions: 10 Stadtteile

Government
  - Mayor (2022–30): Frank Zimmermann (CDU)

Area
  - Total: 62.59 km^{2} (24.17 sq mi)
- Elevation: 329 m (1,079 ft)

Population (2025-12-31)
  - Total: 12,054
  - Density: 192.6/km^{2} (498.8/sq mi)
- Time zone: UTC+01:00 (CET)
  - Summer (DST): UTC+02:00 (CEST)
- Postal codes: 74405
- Dialling codes: 07971
- Vehicle registration: SHA
- Website: www.gaildorf.de

Gaildorf (German pronunciation: [ˈɡaɪldɔʁf]) is a town in the district of Schwäbisch Hall, in Baden-Württemberg, Germany. It is located on the river Kocher, 13 km south of Schwäbisch Hall. Gaildorf is the approximate center of the Limpurger Land district, formerly a county of the Holy Roman Empire ruled by the counts Schenk von Limpurg until their extinction in 1713, thereafter inherited by a number of female heirs, and mediatized to the Kingdom of Württemberg in 1806.

== Notable people ==
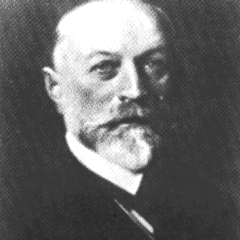
Hermann Frasch

- Friedrich Kausler (1806–1883), member of Landtag
- Philipp Heinrich Hasenmeyer (1700-1783), organ-maker
- Emil Walther (1807–1857), Württembergian city councilman
- Theobald Kerner (1817–1907), doctor and poet (son of Justinus Kerner)
- Karl Reibel (1824–1895), merchant and member of landtag
- Wilhelm August von Breitling (1835–1914), prime minister of Württemberg
- Karl Nicolai (1839–1892), Schultheiß and politician
- Richard Blezinger (1847–1928), pharmacist and fossil-collector in Crailsheim
- Reinhold Kißling (born 1926), agriculturalist
- Horst Hübner (1936–2009), writer
- Stefan Heucke (born 1959), composer
- Hartmut Holzwarth (born 1969), politician (CDU)
- Hermann Frasch (1851–1914), mining engineer

== Buildings and structures ==
Naturstromspeicher Gaildorf, a combination of wind park and pumped-storage hydroelectric power plant. Three of the wind turbines were from 2017 to 2019 the tallest in the world.
