= Dreetz =

- Municipality
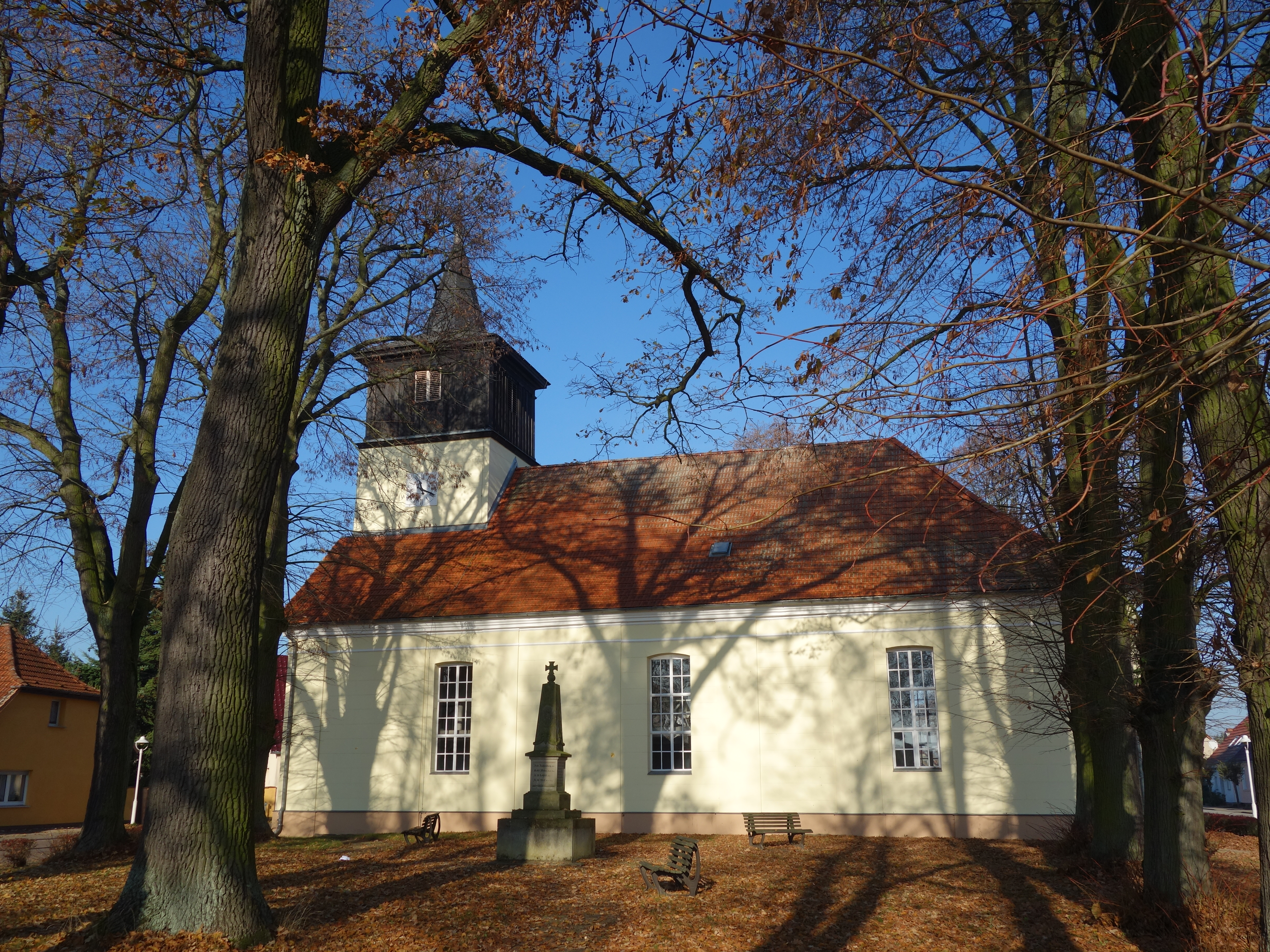
- Village church

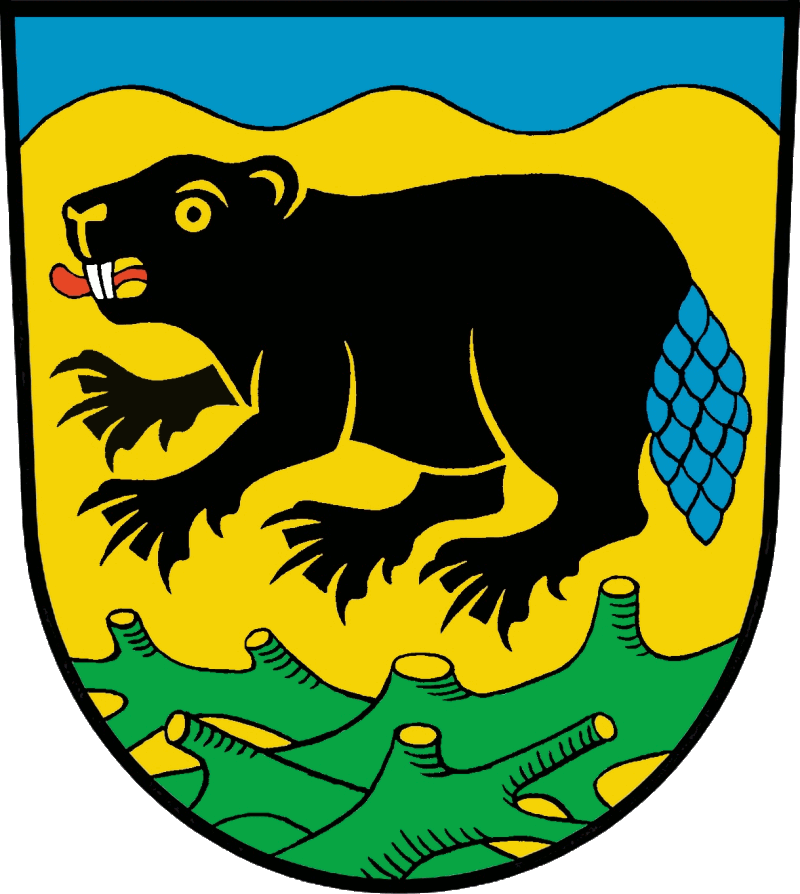
- Coat of arms

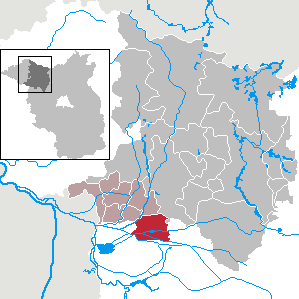
- Location of Dreetz within Ostprignitz-Ruppin district
- Interactive map of Dreetz
- Location within Germany Location within Brandenburg
- Coordinates: 52°47′59″N 12°28′00″E
- Country: Germany
- State: Brandenburg
- District: Ostprignitz-Ruppin
- Municipal assoc.: Neustadt (Dosse)
- Subdivisions: 5 Ortsteile

Government
  - Mayor (2024–29): Babette Findeis (Ind.)

Area
  - Total: 64.43 km^{2} (24.88 sq mi)
- Elevation: 29 m (95 ft)

Population (2025-12-31)
  - Total: 1,112
  - Density: 17.26/km^{2} (44.70/sq mi)
- Time zone: UTC+01:00 (CET)
  - Summer (DST): UTC+02:00 (CEST)
- Postal codes: 16845
- Dialling codes: 033970
- Vehicle registration: OPR
- Website: www.Gemeinde-Dreetz.de

Dreetz is a municipality in the Ostprignitz-Ruppin district, in Brandenburg, Germany.

== History ==
From 1815 to 1945, Dreetz was part of the Prussian Province of Brandenburg. From 1952 to 1990, it was part of the Bezirk Potsdam of East Germany.

== Demography ==
Development of population since 1875 within the current boundaries (Blue line: Population; Dotted line: Comparison to population development of Brandenburg state; Grey background: Time of Nazi rule; Red background: Time of communist rule)

Dreetz: Population development
within the current boundaries (2013)

Year	Pop.	±% p.a.
1875	2,447	—
1890	2,276	−0.48%
1910	1,951	−0.77%
1925	1,871	−0.28%
1933	1,879	+0.05%
1939	2,034	+1.33%
1946	2,566	+3.37%
1950	2,630	+0.62%
1964	2,036	−1.81%
1971	1,883	−1.11%
1981	1,530	−2.05%
1985	1,504	−0.43%
1989	1,447	−0.96%
1990	1,396	−3.52%
1991	1,353	−3.08%
1992	1,328	−1.85%
1993	1,310	−1.36%
1994	1,310	+0.00%
1995	1,297	−0.99%
1996	1,286	−0.85%

Year	Pop.	±% p.a.
1997	1,284	−0.16%
1998	1,292	+0.62%
1999	1,284	−0.62%
2000	1,278	−0.47%
2001	1,263	−1.17%
2002	1,256	−0.55%
2003	1,254	−0.16%
2004	1,261	+0.56%
2005	1,261	+0.00%
2006	1,240	−1.67%
2007	1,226	−1.13%
2008	1,225	−0.08%
2009	1,230	+0.41%
2010	1,206	−1.95%
2011	1,147	−4.89%
2012	1,157	+0.87%
2013	1,162	+0.43%
2014	1,153	−0.77%
2015	1,157	+0.35%
2016	1,147	−0.86%
