= Tensfeld =

- Municipality
- Coat of arms

- Location of Tensfeld within Segeberg district
- Interactive map of Tensfeld
- Location within Germany Location within Schleswig-Holstein
- Coordinates: 54°2′42″N 10°19′9″E
- Country: Germany
- State: Schleswig-Holstein
- District: Segeberg
- Municipal assoc.: Bornhöved

Government
  - Mayor: Beatrix Klüver

Area
  - Total: 7.64 km^{2} (2.95 sq mi)
- Elevation: 40 m (130 ft)

Population (2025-12-31)
  - Total: 753
  - Density: 98.6/km^{2} (255/sq mi)
- Time zone: UTC+01:00 (CET)
  - Summer (DST): UTC+02:00 (CEST)
- Postal codes: 23824
- Dialling codes: 04557
- Vehicle registration: SE
- Website: www.amt- bornhoeved.de

Tensfeld is a municipality in the district of Segeberg, in Schleswig-Holstein, Germany.
