= Jordi Tixier =

French motorcycle racer

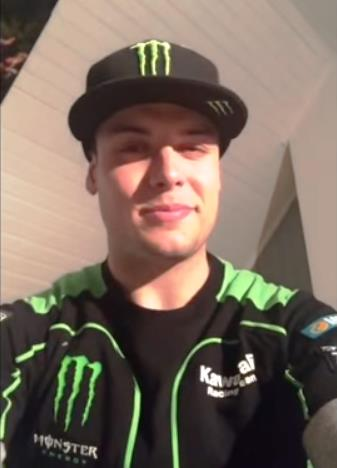
- Tixier in 2016.
- Nationality: French
- Born: 2 November 1991 (age 34) Étampes, France

Motocross career
- Years active: 2009-present
- Teams: KTM (2011-2014); Kawasaki (2015-2017); KTM (2018- )
- Championships: 2010 FIM 125cc; 2010 EMX 125cc; 2014 MX2
- Wins: • MX2: 2

Jordi Tixier (born 2 November 1991) is a French professional motocross rider. He is known for winning the 2014 MX2 World Championship. Tixier took part in the inaugural Indian Supercross Racing League (ISRL) and won a double winning two motos on 28 January 2024.

== 2014 MX2 Season ==
Year	Rnd 1	Rnd 2	Rnd 3	Rnd 4	Rnd 5	Rnd 6	Rnd 7	Rnd 8	Rnd 9	Rnd 10	Rnd 11	Rnd 12	Rnd 13	Rnd 14	Rnd 15	Rnd 16	Rnd 17	Average Finish	Podium Percent	Place
2014 MX2	8	7	11	6	3	3	5	4	3	2	3	2	3	1	2	4	1	4.00	59%	1st
