= Max Nagl =

German motorcycle racer (born 1987)

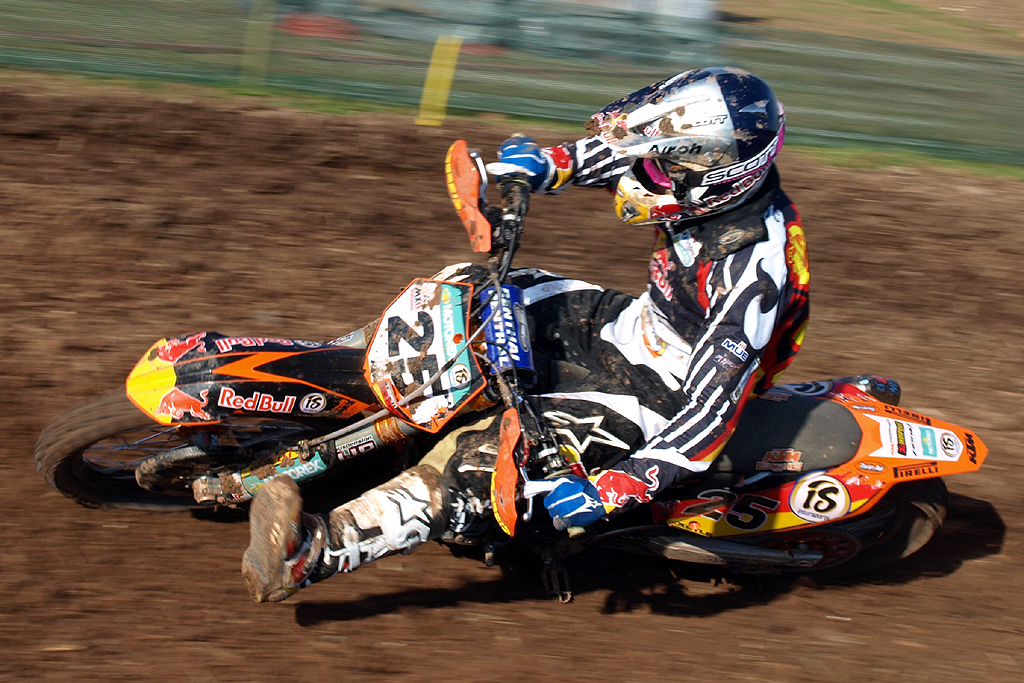
- Nationality: German
- Born: 7 August 1987 (age 39) Weilheim, Germany

Motocross career
- Years active: 2003–present
- Teams: Red Bull IceOne Husqvarna Factory Racing, Previous: Red Bull KTM; HRC Honda
- Grands Prix: 194
- Wins: •MXGP: 9
- GP debut: 2003, GP of Germany, Teutschenthal, MX2
- First GP win: 2008, GP of Italy, Faenza

Maximilian "Max" Nagl (born 7 August 1987) is a German professional motocross racer. He competed in the Motocross World Championship from 2003 to 2019.

Nagl was born in Weilheim, Germany. He Had his most successful season riding for Kimi Räikkönen's Ice 1 Racing Husqvarna factory racing team where he took multiple GP wins. Nagl looked promising for the title that year but was plagued with small injuries that set him back. The ice one racing team was managed by FIM racer Antti Pyrhönen. In the 2009 FIM Motocross World Championship season, he finished second to Antonio Cairoli in the MX1-GP series.

Nagl was a member of the winning German team at the 2012 Motocross des Nations event that included Ken Roczen and Marcus Schiffer. Their victory marked the first German win in the history of the Motocross des Nations.

== Season results ==
- 2000: 1. Place German Championship 85 cm³
- 2001: 1. Place ADAC-Junior-Cup 85 cm³
- 2002: 1. Place DMSB-Cup, 5. Place German Championship 125 cm³
- 2003: 3. Place ADAC MX Masters, 35. Place World Championship 125 cm³
- 2004: 1. Place ADAC MX Masters, 28. Place World Championship MX2
- 2005: 3. Place ADAC MX Masters, 16. Place World Championship MX2
- 2006: 1. Place ADAC MX Masters, 20. Place World Championship MX2
- 2007: 3. Place ADAC MX Masters, 18. Place World Championship MX1
- 2008: 1. Place ADAC MX Masters, 6. Place World Championship MX1 (KTM)
- 2009: 4. Place ADAC MX Masters, 2. Place World Championship MX1 (KTM)
- 2010: 7. Place ADAC MX Masters, 4. Place World Championship MX1(KTM)
- 2011: 5. Place World Championship MX1 (KTM)
- 2012: 5. Place ADAC MX Masters, 16. Place World Championship MX1, 1.Place Motocross des Nations with Ken Roczen and Marcus Schiffer (KTM)
- 2013: 3. Place ADAC MX Masters, 10. Place World Championship MX1 (Honda)
- 2014: 10. Place ADAC MX Masters,6. Place World Championship MXGP (Honda)
