= 2017 FIM Motocross World Championship =

Motocross championship season

The 2017 FIM Motocross World Championship was the 61st FIM Motocross World Championship season. It included 20 events, starting at Losail in Qatar on 25 February, and ending at Villars-sous-Écot in France on 17 September. In the main MXGP class, Tim Gajser was the defending champion after taking his first title in 2016. In the MX2 class, Jeffrey Herlings was the 2016 champion, but he moved up to the MXGP class after taking his third MX2 title.

== Race calendar and results ==
A 20-round calendar for the 2017 season was announced on 15 October 2016.

=== MXGP ===
Round	Date	Grand Prix	Location	Race 1 Winner	Race 2 Winner	Round Winner	Report
1	25 February	Qatar	Losail	(Italy) Tony Cairoli	(Italy) Tony Cairoli	(Italy) Tony Cairoli	Report
2	5 March	Indonesia	Pangkal Pinang	(United Kingdom) Shaun Simpson	Race Cancelled	(United Kingdom) Shaun Simpson	Report
3	19 March	Argentina	Neuquén	(Slovenia) Tim Gajser	(Slovenia) Tim Gajser	(Slovenia) Tim Gajser	Report
4	2 April	Mexico	Leon	(Slovenia) Tim Gajser	(Slovenia) Tim Gajser	(Slovenia) Tim Gajser	Report
5	16 April	Italy	Pietramurata	(Italy) Tony Cairoli	(Slovenia) Tim Gajser	(Italy) Tony Cairoli	Report
6	23 April	Netherlands	Valkenswaard	(France) Gautier Paulin	(Italy) Tony Cairoli	(France) Gautier Paulin	Report
7	7 May	Latvia	Ķegums	(Netherlands) Jeffrey Herlings	(Netherlands) Jeffrey Herlings	(Netherlands) Jeffrey Herlings	Report
8	21 May	Germany	Teutschenthal	(Netherlands) Jeffrey Herlings	(Italy) Tony Cairoli	(Italy) Tony Cairoli	Report
9	28 May	France	Ernee	(Germany) Max Nagl	(Belgium) Clément Desalle	(Belgium) Clément Desalle	Report
10	11 June	Russia	Orlyonok	(Netherlands) Jeffrey Herlings	(Belgium) Clément Desalle	(Belgium) Clément Desalle	Report
11	25 June	Italy	Ottobiano	(Italy) Tony Cairoli	(Italy) Tony Cairoli	(Italy) Tony Cairoli	Report
12	2 July	Portugal	Agueda	(Netherlands) Jeffrey Herlings	(Italy) Tony Cairoli	(Italy) Tony Cairoli	Report
13	23 July	Czech Republic	Loket	(Slovenia) Tim Gajser	(Italy) Tony Cairoli	(Italy) Tony Cairoli	Report
14	6 August	Belgium	Lommel	(Netherlands) Jeffrey Herlings	(Netherlands) Jeffrey Herlings	(Netherlands) Jeffrey Herlings	Report
15	13 August	Switzerland	Frauenfeld	(Switzerland) Arnaud Tonus	(Netherlands) Jeffrey Herlings	(Netherlands) Jeffrey Herlings	Report
16	20 August	Sweden	Uddevalla	(Slovenia) Tim Gajser	(France) Romain Febvre	(Slovenia) Tim Gajser	Report
17	3 September	United States	Jacksonville	(United States) Eli Tomac	(Netherlands) Jeffrey Herlings	(Netherlands) Jeffrey Herlings	Report
18	10 September	Netherlands	Assen	(Netherlands) Jeffrey Herlings	(Netherlands) Jeffrey Herlings	(Netherlands) Jeffrey Herlings	Report
19	17 September	France	Villars-sous-Écot	(Slovenia) Tim Gajser	(Netherlands) Jeffrey Herlings	(Netherlands) Jeffrey Herlings	Report

=== MX2 ===
Round	Date	Grand Prix	Location	Race 1 Winner	Race 2 Winner	Round Winner	Report
1	25 February	Qatar	Losail	(Latvia) Pauls Jonass	(Latvia) Pauls Jonass	(Latvia) Pauls Jonass	Report
2	5 March	Indonesia	Pangkal Pinang	(Switzerland) Jeremy Seewer	(Italy) Samuele Bernardini	(Switzerland) Jeremy Seewer	Report
3	19 March	Argentina	Neuquén	(Latvia) Pauls Jonass	(Latvia) Pauls Jonass	(Latvia) Pauls Jonass	Report
4	2 April	Mexico	Leon	(Switzerland) Jeremy Seewer	(United States) Thomas Covington	(United States) Thomas Covington	Report
5	16 April	Italy	Pietramurata	(Latvia) Pauls Jonass	(Spain) Jorge Prado	(Spain) Jorge Prado	Report
6	23 April	Netherlands	Valkenswaard	(Latvia) Pauls Jonass	(Latvia) Pauls Jonass	(Latvia) Pauls Jonass	Report
7	7 May	Latvia	Ķegums	(Denmark) Thomas Kjær Olsen	(Latvia) Pauls Jonass	(Denmark) Thomas Kjær Olsen	Report
8	21 May	Germany	Teutschenthal	(Switzerland) Jeremy Seewer	(United States) Thomas Covington	(Switzerland) Jeremy Seewer	Report
9	28 May	France	Ernee	(Latvia) Pauls Jonass	(France) Benoît Paturel	(Latvia) Pauls Jonass	Report
10	11 June	Russia	Orlyonok	(Denmark) Thomas Kjær Olsen	(Switzerland) Jeremy Seewer	(Latvia) Pauls Jonass	Report
11	25 June	Italy	Ottobiano	(Switzerland) Jeremy Seewer	(Latvia) Pauls Jonass	(Switzerland) Jeremy Seewer	Report
12	2 July	Portugal	Agueda	(Latvia) Pauls Jonass	(Switzerland) Jeremy Seewer	(Switzerland) Jeremy Seewer	Report
13	23 July	Czech Republic	Loket	(United States) Thomas Covington	(Latvia) Pauls Jonass	(Latvia) Pauls Jonass	Report
14	6 August	Belgium	Lommel	(Latvia) Pauls Jonass	(Spain) Jorge Prado	(Spain) Jorge Prado	Report
15	13 August	Switzerland	Frauenfeld	(Switzerland) Jeremy Seewer	(France) Benoît Paturel	(France) Benoît Paturel	Report
16	20 August	Sweden	Uddevalla	(Spain) Jorge Prado	(United States) Thomas Covington	(Switzerland) Jeremy Seewer	Report
17	3 September	United States	Jacksonville	(United States) RJ Hampshire	(United States) RJ Hampshire	(United States) RJ Hampshire	Report
18	10 September	Netherlands	Assen	(Latvia) Pauls Jonass	(Spain) Jorge Prado	(Spain) Jorge Prado	Report
19	17 September	France	Villars-sous-Écot	(United States) Thomas Covington	(Australia) Hunter Lawrence	(United States) Thomas Covington	Report

== MXGP ==
=== Entry list ===
Officially Approved Teams & Riders
Team	Constructor	No	Rider	Rounds
Monster Energy Kawasaki Racing Team	Kawasaki	3	(United States) Eli Tomac	17
Monster Energy Kawasaki Racing Team	Kawasaki	25	(Belgium) Clément Desalle	1–18
Monster Energy Kawasaki Racing Team	Kawasaki	911	(France) Jordi Tixier	1–3, 7–9, 11–13, 17–18
Monster Energy Kawasaki Racing Team	Kawasaki	141	(France) Maxime Desprey	5–6
Wilvo Yamaha MXGP	Yamaha	4	(Switzerland) Arnaud Tonus	1–15, 19
Wilvo Yamaha MXGP	Yamaha	24	(United Kingdom) Shaun Simpson	1–7, 11, 16–19
Husqvarna 8Biano Racing	Husqvarna	7	(Estonia) Tanel Leok	1–16, 18–19
Husqvarna 8Biano Racing	Husqvarna	999	(Portugal) Rui Gonçalves	All
JTECH Racing Suzuki	Suzuki	9	(Belgium) Ken De Dycker	5–9
Rockstar Energy Husqvarna Factory Racing	Husqvarna	12	(Germany) Max Nagl	All
Rockstar Energy Husqvarna Factory Racing	Husqvarna	21	(France) Gautier Paulin	All
Rockstar Energy Husqvarna Factory Racing	Husqvarna	99	(United Kingdom) Max Anstie	1–4, 7–19
Rockstar Energy Husqvarna Factory Racing	Husqvarna	201	(Belgium) Yentel Martens	6
CDP Cortenuova	Yamaha	16	(Italy) Nicola Recchia	5
Marchetti Racing KTM	KTM	17	(Spain) José Butrón	1–15, 18
Team Suzuki World MXGP	Suzuki	22	(Belgium) Kevin Strijbos	1–6, 12–19
Team Suzuki World MXGP	Suzuki	27	(Lithuania) Arminas Jasikonis	2–17
CEC Scandinavian Racing Sports	Suzuki	30	(Sweden) Eddie Hjortmarker	7, 9, 14, 16
CEC Scandinavian Racing Sports	KTM	93	(Sweden) Jonathan Bengtsson	5–9, 11–14
Hitachi KTM UK	KTM	45	(United Kingdom) Jake Nicholls	1–5
e-MX Racing Team	Yamaha	47	(Belgium) Bryan Boulard	5–9, 11, 13–15, 18–19
Maurer GEP Husqvarna	Husqvarna	49	(Slovenia) Jernej Irt	7–8, 11, 13, 15–16, 18–19
62 Motorsport	Husqvarna	62	(Slovenia) Klemen Gerčar	5–7
Team Honda Red Moto	Honda	77	(Italy) Alessandro Lupino	All
Team Honda Red Moto	Honda	92	(Switzerland) Valentin Guillod	1–10, 19
Team Honda Red Moto	Honda	824	(Netherlands) Nick Kouwenberg	18
STC Racing	Yamaha	79	(Netherlands) Jaap Corneth	1
STC Racing	Yamaha	868	(South Africa) Michael Docherty	19
Red Bull KTM Factory Racing	KTM	84	(Netherlands) Jeffrey Herlings	All
Red Bull KTM Factory Racing	KTM	222	(Italy) Tony Cairoli	All
Red Bull KTM Factory Racing	KTM	259	(Netherlands) Glenn Coldenhoff	All
Monster Energy Yamaha Factory MXGP Team	Yamaha	89	(Belgium) Jeremy van Horebeek	1–10, 12–19
Monster Energy Yamaha Factory MXGP Team	Yamaha	461	(France) Romain Febvre	All
Monster Energy Dixon Racing Team Kawasaki	Kawasaki	100	(United Kingdom) Tommy Searle	15–16, 18–19
I-Fly JK Yamaha Racing	Yamaha	119	(United Kingdom) Ryan Houghton	6–8, 11–14, 18
Gebben van Venrooy Kawasaki	Kawasaki	141	(France) Maxime Desprey	7, 9, 11–14, 18–19
Gebben van Venrooy Kawasaki	Kawasaki	685	(France) Steven Lenoir	6
Steels Dr. Jack KTM	KTM	212	(Belgium) Jeffrey Dewulf	11–14
Steels Dr. Jack KTM	KTM	997	(Italy) Riccardo Righi	
Team HRC MXGP	Honda	243	(Slovenia) Tim Gajser	1–9, 11–19
Team HRC MXGP	Honda	718	(Japan) Toshiki Tomita	17
Team HRC MXGP	Honda	777	(Russia) Evgeny Bobryshev	1–8, 10–19
Cofain Racing Team	KTM	909	(Austria) Lukas Neurauter	5–9, 11–13, 15
Carglass Honda	Honda	920	(Spain) Ander Valentin	5–9, 15–16, 19
Wild Card Teams & Riders
Team	Constructor	No	Rider	Rounds
Monster Energy Yamalube Chaparral Yamaha	Yamaha	2	(United States) Cooper Webb	17
24MX Lucas Oil Honda	Honda	9	(Belgium) Ken De Dycker	10–16, 18
24MX Lucas Oil Honda	Honda	71	(Belgium) Damon Graulus	5–16, 18–19
24MX Lucas Oil Honda	Honda	79	(Netherlands) Jaap Corneth	6
Team Chiz Extreme Honda	Honda	11	(United States) Kyle Chisholm	17
ASTES4-TESAR Yamaha	Yamaha	19	(Italy) David Philippaerts	5
Yamaha Motor France	Yamaha	32	(France) Milko Potisek	9, 11, 18
GBO Motorsports	Kawasaki	36	(Italy) Matteo Bonini	5, 11
Phoenix Tools Honda	Honda	37	(Estonia) Gert Krestinov	6, 14
Ribamotos Honda	Honda	38	(Portugal) Sandro Peixe	12
	Kawasaki	50	(Bahrain) Hassan Nooraldeen	1
Autotrader JGR Suzuki	Suzuki	51	(United States) Justin Barcia	17
Marelli Sports	Yamaha	54	(Argentina) Ezequiel Fanello	3
	Husqvarna	58	(Argentina) Nicolas Carranza	3
Escuderia X Honda	Honda	60	(Ecuador) Jetro Salazar	3
APJ Racing Team	Yamaha	73	(Slovenia) Peter Irt	5–7, 11, 13, 15–16
Kosak Racing KTM	KTM	82	(Switzerland) Andy Baumgartner	8, 15, 19
Biketown Falun	Yamaha	90	(Sweden) Anton Wallin	16
Star Motor Honda	Honda	113	(Norway) Henrik Wahl	16
Castrol Power1 Suzuki	Suzuki	117	(Germany) Stefan Ekerold	14–16, 19
Team SR Honda	Honda	121	(France) Xavier Boog	9, 19
	KTM	132	(Indonesia) Asep Lukman	2
	Husqvarna	133	(Indonesia) Ivan Harry	2
	Suzuki	139	(United States) Nathen LaPorte	4
Team Carey	KTM	139	(United States) Nathen LaPorte	17
Sarholz KTM	KTM	149	(Germany) Dennis Ullrich	8
	Honda	150	(Chile) Jose Manuel Fernandez	3
Sõmerpalu MK	Husqvarna	151	(Estonia) Harri Kullas	5–7, 14, 16, 18
DAM Racing KTM	KTM	164	(Belgium) Dietger Damiaens	14
KTM Racing Argentina	KTM	171	(Argentina) Juan Pablo Luzzardi	3
Scoccia Racing Team	Kawasaki	173	(Italy) Pier Filippo Bertuzzo	5
Honda Avant	Honda	179	(Argentina) Joaquin Poli	3
Championship Powersports Racing	Honda	184	(United States) Jeffrey Walker	17
JD 191 KTM	KTM	191	(Czech Republic) Jaromír Romančík	5, 7–11, 13, 15–16
JD 191 KTM	KTM	831	(Poland) Tomasz Wysocki	5, 7–8, 13, 15, 18
Cab Screens Husqvarna	Husqvarna	195	(United Kingdom) Dan Thornhill	19
Team Husqvarna Argentina	Husqvarna	198	(Argentina) Agustin Poli	3
	KTM	204	(Indonesia) Hilman Maksum	2
Precision Site Work Honda	Honda	210	(Sweden) Fredrik Noren	17
JHMX Service KTM	KTM	212	(Belgium) Jeffrey Dewulf	6
JHMX Service KTM	KTM	664	(Sweden) Filip Bengtsson	6–7, 14, 16, 18
PMC Honda	Honda	221	(Estonia) Priit Rätsep	7, 11, 14
	Suzuki	225	(Mexico) Eduardo Andrade	4
Hulho Motocross Team	KTM	227	(Czech Republic) Martin Finek	13
Team VRT 3as	Honda	231	(France) Kevin Ballanger	9
Team VRT 3as	Honda	737	(France) Valentin Teillet	9
Buksa/Ados KTM Team	KTM	232	(Czech Republic) Martin Michek	5, 8, 13, 15
KTM Scandinavia	KTM	249	(Denmark) Nikolaj Larsen	16
Elf Team Pfeil Kawasaki	Kawasaki	251	(Belgium) Jens Getteman	8, 14
	Kawasaki	261	(Indonesia) Farhan Fahrodjie	2
Motorsport Temuco	Kawasaki	286	(Chile) Felipe Danke	3
	KTM	288	(Indonesia) Aldi Lazaroni	2
	KTM	295	(United States) Jack Sigismondi	17
O2 KTM Russia	KTM	301	(Russia) Viacheslav Golovkin	7, 10
Orion Racing Team	KTM	311	(Czech Republic) Petr Bartoš	13
Tibro MC Service	Honda	315	(Sweden) Nicklas Gustavsson	14, 16
Pardi Racing Team	Honda	316	(Italy) Giovanni Bertuccelli	11
Rocky Mountain ATV KTM	KTM	332	(United States) Benny Bloss	17
	KTM	333	(Russia) Alexander Efimov	10
Team Max 2	Suzuki	337	(Czech Republic) Rudolf Weschta	13
Sturm Racing Team	KTM	347	(Austria) Johannes Klein	5, 15
AGMX Honda	Honda	366	(Switzerland) Alain Schafer	15
	Honda	369	(United States) Jason Astudillo	17
Garin MX Team	Husqvarna	400	(Russia) Vitaly Gusev	10
Flyin' Taco Racing	Yamaha	409	(United States) Carlos Short	17
GSM Yamaha	Yamaha	411	(France) Nicolas Dercourt	19
Five Star Powersports	KTM	412	(United States) Jared Lesher	17
Glory Hills MX	Honda	429	(United States) Drew Craven	17
	Suzuki	444	(Russia) Aleksandr Bugreev	10
LMX Racing	Honda	452	(France) Ludovic Macler	19
SKS Racing Team	Husqvarna	494	(Netherlands) Sven van der Mierden	6, 14, 18
	Kawasaki	517	(United States) Jared Hicks	17
	KTM	551	(Russia) Vladislav Leonov	10
	Husqvarna	595	(Russia) Evgeny Mikhaylov	10
On the Pipe Racing	Suzuki	684	(United States) Justis Heckendorf	17
RFX KTM	KTM	704	(United Kingdom) Ashley Wilde	6
Falcon Motorsports KTM	KTM	705	(Belgium) Cyril Genot	14
	Suzuki	707	(Argentina) Victor Dario Arco	3
Tristan Moto Husqvarna	Husqvarna	710	(Switzerland) Nicolas Bender	8–9, 11, 15, 19
Team Lane Racing	KTM	711	(United States) Tristan Lane	17
Alliance Steel	Husqvarna	715	(United States) Kele Russell	17
LR Motorsport - Moto17	KTM	721	(France) Lucas Imbert	5, 9
	Yamaha	764	(Ukraine) Roman Morozov	10
	Yamaha	771	(Argentina) Marco Schmit	3
KTM Switzerland	KTM	778	(Switzerland) Yves Furlato	15
Team Ride 4 One	Honda	817	(France) Jason Clermont	9, 15, 19
JWR Yamaha	Yamaha	824	(Netherlands) Nick Kouwenberg	16
Infinity Motorsports UAE	Kawasaki	868	(South Africa) Michael Docherty	1
Ghidinelli Racing Team	Yamaha	878	(Italy) Stefano Pezzuto	5, 13, 15
	Yamaha	890	(Bolivia) Marco Antezana	3
	Yamaha	913	(Ecuador) Miguel Cordovez	17
KMP Repsol Honda	Honda	926	(Belgium) Jeremy Delince	8, 18
Porter Racing	Honda	927	(United States) Jamal Porter	17
	Kawasaki	952	(Argentina) Jose Gerardo Felipe	3
Team LMR	KTM	995	(United States) Christopher Lykens	17

=== Riders Championship ===
Pos	Rider	Bike	QAT (Qatar)		INA (Indonesia)		ARG (Argentina)		MEX (Mexico)		TRE (Italy)		NED (Netherlands)		LAT (Latvia)		GER (Germany)		FRA (France)		RUS (Russia)		ITA (Italy)		POR (Portugal)		CZE (Czech Republic)		BEL (Belgium)		SUI (Switzerland)		SWE (Sweden)		USA (United States)		NED (Netherlands)		FRA (France)		Points
1	(Italy) Cairoli	KTM	1	1	4	C	9	5	4	2	1	2	9	1	5	2	2	1	2	3	2	9	1	1	2	1	3	1	2	2	3	4	9	7	3	2	2	6	9	Ret	722
2	(Netherlands) Herlings	KTM	18	11	17	C	12	7	14	9	14	4	3	3	1	1	1	2	5	5	1	8	2	2	1	2	5	3	1	1	6	1	2	Ret	2	1	1	1	3	1	672
3	(France) Paulin	Husqvarna	6	5	13	C	6	4	3	3	4	6	1	2	7	7	3	3	6	2	5	3	3	10	12	11	4	5	7	6	4	2	3	3	20	4	8	8	5	6	602
4	(Belgium) Desalle	Kawasaki	2	4	3	C	3	10	8	6	5	5	7	14	2	5	4	4	4	1	3	1	8	7	6	10	2	2	6	5	10	11	4	4	9	8	Ret	DNS			544
5	(Slovenia) Gajser	Honda	3	2	7	C	1	1	1	1	3	1	6	4	14	Ret	12	10	DNS	DNS			10	11	8	6	1	4	9	10	7	5	1	2	4	7	Ret	DNS	1	3	530
6	(France) Febvre	Yamaha	10	3	18	C	4	8	11	7	8	17	11	6	16	10	7	5	7	4	10	2	4	6	5	4	7	6	8	7	5	3	6	1	Ret	DNS	4	3	2	4	519
7	(Belgium) Van Horebeek	Yamaha	5	6	10	C	2	3	5	5	6	8	2	5	6	14	5	15	3	6	DNS	DNS			15	Ret	8	7	4	13	8	6	7	6	10	9	Ret	5	8	7	443
8	(Germany) Nagl	Husqvarna	8	16	Ret	C	8	6	7	8	11	9	10	11	11	8	10	8	1	9	8	11	7	4	4	5	10	13	5	9	13	7	Ret	15	5	11	10	2	14	12	439
9	(United Kingdom) Anstie	Husqvarna	13	10	14	C	7	12	9	13					9	6	8	6	9	11	4	5	5	3	10	8	Ret	12	14	3	2	12	13	8	6	6	3	4	4	2	436
10	(Netherlands) Coldenhoff	KTM	15	8	2	C	14	Ret	17	11	17	10	8	10	10	9	6	7	11	8	12	6	6	13	7	14	11	11	3	4	15	9	5	5	7	10	6	15	7	9	424
11	(Russia) Bobryshev	Honda	4	7	9	C	5	2	2	14	7	3	4	8	3	4	DNS	DNS			13	10	18	12	11	9	14	9	12	Ret	9	8	8	10	8	12	7	14	11	Ret	397
12	(Switzerland) Tonus	Yamaha	7	19	15	C	Ret	11	6	4	2	7	14	9	8	Ret	9	22	8	7	9	4	9	8	9	7	6	10	10	8	1	Ret							10	5	355
13	(Lithuania) Jasikonis	Suzuki			16	C	13	14	13	12	12	11	5	7	Ret	3	11	9	10	17	7	7	Ret	5	3	3	20	8	11	Ret	12	Ret	10	9	Ret	DNS					283
14	(Belgium) Strijbos	Suzuki	11	12	6	C	11	9	10	10	9	26	Ret	DNS											Ret	DNS	9	15	13	11	14	13	Ret	13	Ret	5	5	7	6	8	223
15	(Estonia) Leok	Husqvarna	16	17	8	C	Ret	19	19	18	16	18	13	12	12	11	13	11	19	13	20	13	15	14	13	12	15	14	15	15	19	Ret	14	11			9	9	17	10	223
16	(Italy) Lupino	Honda	14	18	Ret	C	19	Ret	16	20	18	13	20	Ret	Ret	DNS	20	14	16	12	6	14	13	9	14	13	12	16	17	14	11	10	12	Ret	14	14	16	12	13	13	208
17	(United Kingdom) Simpson	Yamaha	17	14	1	C	10	13	12	15	10	14	12	13	4	Ret							DNS	DNS									11	14	12	Ret	11	13	15	11	183
18	(Portugal) Gonçalves	Husqvarna	19	15	5	C	17	17	20	19	15	20	19	20	23	17	21	18	21	15	15	17	20	15	18	16	16	Ret	18	17	18	14	18	Ret	15	17	15	16	16	14	141
19	(Spain) Butrón	KTM	12	13	Ret	C	16	16	Ret	16	13	12	Ret	Ret	21	15	15	16	13	10	Ret	15	12	17	16	17	17	18	Ret	19	DNS	DNS					Ret	DNS			122
20	(France) Tixier	Kawasaki	9	9	12	C	18	DNS							13	13	Ret	DNS	15	18			11	Ret	Ret	DNS	13	Ret							18	Ret	DNS	DNS			82
21	(Switzerland) Guillod	Honda	Ret	Ret	19	C	15	15	15	17	24	19	24	16	18	Ret	17	12	14	14	DNS	DNS																	24	Ret	61
22	(Belgium) De Dycker	Suzuki									26	22	25	Ret	19	18	16	17	20	Ret																					60
22	(Belgium) De Dycker	Honda																			14	12	17	19	Ret	18	19	17	24	16	17	Ret	16	22			Ret	DNS			60
23	(Belgium) Graulus	Honda									19	16	23	Ret	15	21	14	13	Ret	22	17	20	19	21	21	Ret	Ret	20	Ret	Ret	20	16	17	21			17	18	20	15	60
24	(Estonia) Kullas	Husqvarna									25	21	17	17	17	12													16	12			Ret	16			13	10			59
25	(United States) Tomac	Kawasaki																																	1	3					45
26	(Sweden) F. Bengtsson	KTM											21	15	20	20													20	18			19	17			12	11			37
27	(France) Desprey	Kawasaki									20	15	22	23	24	23			12	21			22	Ret	17	15	Ret	19	DNS	DNS							Ret	21	12	Ret	37
28	(United Kingdom) Searle	Kawasaki																													16	15	15	12			14	Ret	DNS	DNS	33
29	(France) Potisek	Yamaha																	17	20			14	Ret													Ret	17			16
30	(United Kingdom) Nicholls	KTM	20	20	11	C	Ret	Ret	18	21	23	Ret																													15
31	(United States) Barcia	Suzuki																																	13	15					14
32	(Czech Republic) Romancik	KTM									29	33			28	24	22	20	22	23	16	16	Ret	DNS			18	Ret			21	Ret	23	23							14
33	(Belgium) Dewulf	KTM											16	19									21	16	19	Ret	27	24	Ret	DNS											14
34	(Estonia) Rätsep	Honda													22	16							16	18					Ret	Ret											13
35	(Russia) Mikhaylov	Husqvarna																			11	Ret																			10
36	(Sweden) Noren	Honda																																	11	Ret					10
37	(Slovenia) J. Irt	Husqvarna													Ret	Ret	Ret	DNS					Ret	DNS			29	26			22	18	21	19			20	Ret	18	20	10
38	(United States) Chisholm	Honda																																	17	16					9
39	(United States) Bloss	KTM																																	Ret	13					8
40	(France) Boog	Honda																	18	16																			Ret	DNS	8
41	(France) Dercourt	Yamaha																																					19	16	7
42	(Belgium) Martens	Husqvarna											15	Ret																											6
43	(Russia) Golovkin	KTM													32	27					18	18																			6
44	(Netherlands) van der Mierden	Husqvarna											29	24															19	21							18	20			6
45	(Ecuador) Cordovez	Yamaha																																	16	21					5
46	(Japan) Tomita	Honda																																	19	18					5
47	(Czech Republic) Michek	KTM									30	25					23	23									Ret	22			26	17									4
48	(France) Clermont	Honda																	24	25											27	24							23	17	4
49	(Estonia) Krestinov	Honda											18	21															21	20											4
50	(Denmark) Larsen	KTM																															20	18							4
51	(Ecuador) Salazar	Honda					20	18																																	4
52	(Belgium) Getteman	Kawasaki															19	19											22	Ret											4
53	(Slovenia) P. Irt	Yamaha									33	29	31	26	27	19							23	23			26	29			23	19	24	Ret							4
54	(Belgium) Delincé	Honda															30	25																			19	19			4
55	(Russia) Leonov	KTM																			19	19																			4
56	(United Kingdom) Thornhill	Husqvarna																																					21	18	3
57	(Germany) Ullrich	KTM															18	21																							3
58	(France) Lenoir	Kawasaki											26	18																											3
59	(Austria) Neurauter	KTM									Ret	24	DNS	DNS	DNS	DNS	29	27	28	27			27	27	20	19	Ret	21			DNS	DNS									3
60	(Spain) Valentin	Honda									21	Ret	Ret	Ret	26	22	26	24	30	19											Ret	Ret	DNS	DNS					Ret	Ret	2
61	(Germany) Ekerold	Suzuki																											Ret	DNS	25	22	22	Ret					Ret	19	2
62	(United States) Lane	KTM																																	22	19					2
63	(Switzerland) Baumgartner	KTM															24	Ret													Ret	20							22	21	1
64	(United States) Lesher	KTM																																	21	20					1
65	(Argentina) J. Poli	Honda					21	20																																	1
66	(Italy) Bonini	Kawasaki									31	34											24	20																	1
67	(Portugal) Peixe	Honda																							24	20															1
68	(Netherlands) Kouwenberg	Yamaha																															Ret	20							1
68	(Netherlands) Kouwenberg	Honda																																			Ret	Ret			1
69	(Indonesia) Fahrodjie	Kawasaki			20	C																																			1
	(United Kingdom) Houghton	Yamaha											30	25	29	26	28	29					26	24	22	21	25	23	25	Ret							21	22			0
	(Italy) Pezzuto	Yamaha									22	Ret															21	25			24	21									0
	(United States) LaPorte	Suzuki							21	22																															0
	(United States) LaPorte	KTM																																	26	24					0
	(Argentina) Arco	Suzuki					23	21																																	0
	(Indonesia) Lukman	KTM			21	C																																			0
	(Russia) Efimov	KTM																			21	DNS																			0
	(Sweden) J. Bengtsson	KTM									28	31	27	22	25	Ret	DNS	DNS	29	Ret			25	22	23	DNS	30	28	DNS	DNS											0
	(Belgium) Boulard	Yamaha									Ret	32	32	28	33	28	27	28	Ret	DNS			Ret	26			28	Ret	27	25	29	27					23	23	Ret	22	0
	(Poland) Wysocki	KTM									32	30			30	29	25	26									23	27			28	Ret					22	24			0
	(Mexico) Andrade	Suzuki							22	23																															0
	(United States) Porter	Honda																																	23	22					0
	(Chile) Fernandez	Honda					28	22																																	0
	(Czech Republic) Finek	KTM																									22	31													0
	(Argentina) Luzzardi	KTM					22	Ret																																	0
	(Belgium) Genot	KTM																											Ret	22											0
	(Indonesia) Lazaroni	KTM			22	C																																			0
	(Belgium) Damiaens	KTM																											23	23											0
	(France) Imbert	KTM									27	28							23	24																					0
	(United States) Russell	Husqvarna																																	24	23					0
	(Argentina) Felipe	Kawasaki					27	23																																	0
	(Switzerland) Schafer	Honda																													32	23									0
	(Italy) Philippaerts	Yamaha									Ret	23																													0
	(Indonesia) Harry	Husqvarna			23	C																																			0
	(Sweden) Hjortmarker	Suzuki													31	25			27	26									26	24			25	24							0
	(Argentina) Carranza	Husqvarna					24	24																																	0
	(Czech Republic) Weschta	Suzuki																									24	Ret													0
	(Switzerland) Bender	Husqvarna															Ret	30	26	29			28	25							31	26							DNS	DNS	0
	(Bolivia) Antezana	Yamaha					25	26																																	0
	(Sweden) Wallin	Yamaha																															26	25							0
	(France) Ballanger	Honda																	25	28																					0
	(United States) Short	Yamaha																																	28	25					0
	(Switzerland) Furlato	KTM																													30	25									0
	(Argentina) Schmit	Yamaha					Ret	25																																	0
	(United States) Walker	Honda																																	25	Ret					0
	(France) Macler	Honda																																					25	Ret	0
	(Argentina) A. Poli	Husqvarna					26	Ret																																	0
	(United States) Hicks	Kawasaki																																	Ret	26					0
	(Slovenia) Gerčar	Husqvarna									Ret	27	28	27	Ret	DNS																									0
	(Norway) Wahl	Honda																															27	27							0
	(United States) Craven	Honda																																	29	27					0
	(Chile) Danke	Kawasaki					Ret	27																																	0
	(United States) Astudillo	Honda																																	27	Ret					0
	(Italy) Bertuccelli	Honda																					29	Ret																	0
	(Czech Republic) Bartoš	KTM																									31	30													0
	(Austria) Klein	KTM									34	35																			Ret	Ret									0
	(Argentina) Fanello	Yamaha					Ret	Ret																																	0
	(United States) Lykens	KTM																																	Ret	Ret					0
	(South Africa) Docherty	Kawasaki	DNS	DNS																																					0
	(South Africa) Docherty	Yamaha																																					Ret	DNS	0
	(Indonesia) Maksum	KTM			Ret	C																																			0
	(Italy) Bertuzzo	Kawasaki									Ret	DNS																													0
	(Russia) Gusev	Husqvarna																			Ret	DNS																			0
	(Russia) Bugreev	Suzuki																			Ret	DNS																			0
	(Ukraine) Morozov	Yamaha																			Ret	DNS																			0
	(United States) Heckendorf	Suzuki																																	Ret	DNS					0
	(Netherlands) Corneth	Yamaha	DNS	DNS																																					0
	(Netherlands) Corneth	Honda											DNS	DNS																											0
	(Sweden) Gustavsson	Honda																											DNS	DNS			DNS	DNS							0
	(Bahrain) Nooraldeen	Kawasaki	DNS	DNS																																					0
	(Italy) Recchia	Yamaha									DNS	DNS																													0
	(United Kingdom) Wilde	KTM											DNS	DNS																											0
	(France) Teillet	Honda																	DNS	DNS																					0
	(United States) Webb	Yamaha																																	DNS	DNS					0
	(United States) Sigismondi	KTM																																	DNS	DNS					0
Pos	Rider	Bike	QAT (Qatar)		INS (Indonesia)		ARG (Argentina)		MEX (Mexico)		TRE (Italy)		NED (Netherlands)		LAT (Latvia)		GER (Germany)		FRA (France)		RUS (Russia)		ITA (Italy)		POR (Portugal)		CZE (Czech Republic)		BEL (Belgium)		SUI (Switzerland)		SWE (Sweden)		USA (United States)		NED (Netherlands)		FRA (France)		Points

Colour	Result
Gold	Winner
Silver	Second place
Bronze	Third place
Green	Points classification
Blue	Non-points classification
Blue	Non-classified finish (NC)
Purple	Retired, not classified (Ret)
Red	Did not qualify (DNQ)
Red	Did not pre-qualify (DNPQ)
Black	Disqualified (DSQ)
White	Did not start (DNS)
White	Withdrew (WD)
White	Race cancelled (C)
Blank	Did not practice (DNP)
Blank	Did not arrive (DNA)
Blank	Excluded (EX)

=== Manufacturers Championship ===
Pos	Bike	QAT (Qatar)		INS (Indonesia)		ARG (Argentina)		MEX (Mexico)		TRE (Italy)		NED (Netherlands)		LAT (Latvia)		GER (Germany)		FRA (France)		RUS (Russia)		ITA (Italy)		POR (Portugal)		CZE (Czech Republic)		BEL (Belgium)		SUI (Switzerland)		SWE (Sweden)		USA (United States)		NED (Netherlands)		FRA (France)		Points
1	KTM	1	1	2	C	9	5	4	2	1	2	3	1	1	1	1	1	2	3	1	6	1	1	1	1	3	1	1	1	3	1	2	5	2	1	1	1	3	1	834
2	Husqvarna	6	5	5	C	6	4	3	3	4	6	1	2	7	6	3	3	1	2	4	3	3	3	4	5	4	5	5	3	2	2	3	3	5	4	3	2	4	2	698
3	Yamaha	5	3	1	C	2	3	5	4	2	7	2	5	6	10	5	5	3	4	9	2	4	6	5	4	6	6	4	7	1	3	6	1	10	9	4	3	2	4	659
4	Honda	3	2	7	C	1	1	1	1	3	1	4	4	3	4	12	10	14	12	6	10	10	9	8	6	1	4	9	10	7	5	1	2	4	7	7	12	1	3	631
5	Kawasaki	2	4	3	C	3	10	8	6	5	5	7	14	2	5	4	4	4	1	3	1	8	7	6	10	2	2	6	5	10	11	4	4	1	3	14	21	12	17	584
6	Suzuki	11	12	6	C	11	9	10	10	9	11	5	7	19	3	11	9	10	17	7	7	Ret	5	3	3	9	8	11	11	12	13	10	9	13	5	5	7	6	8	440
Pos	Bike	QAT (Qatar)		INS (Indonesia)		ARG (Argentina)		MEX (Mexico)		TRE (Italy)		NED (Netherlands)		LAT (Latvia)		GER (Germany)		FRA (France)		RUS (Russia)		ITA (Italy)		POR (Portugal)		CZE (Czech Republic)		BEL (Belgium)		SUI (Switzerland)		SWE (Sweden)		USA (United States)		NED (Netherlands)		FRA (France)		Points

Colour	Result
Gold	Winner
Silver	Second place
Bronze	Third place
Green	Points classification
Blue	Non-points classification
Blue	Non-classified finish (NC)
Purple	Retired, not classified (Ret)
Red	Did not qualify (DNQ)
Red	Did not pre-qualify (DNPQ)
Black	Disqualified (DSQ)
White	Did not start (DNS)
White	Withdrew (WD)
White	Race cancelled (C)
Blank	Did not practice (DNP)
Blank	Did not arrive (DNA)
Blank	Excluded (EX)

== MX2 ==
=== Entry list ===
Officially Approved Teams & Riders
Team	Constructor	No	Rider	Rounds
Kemea Yamaha Yamalube	Yamaha	6	(France) Benoît Paturel	1–16
Kemea Yamaha Yamalube	Yamaha	161	(Sweden) Alvin Östlund	1–3, 5–19
Kemea Yamaha Yamalube	Yamaha	172	(Belgium) Brent Van Doninck	All
Ausio Yamaha	Yamaha	8	(Italy) Kiara Fontanesi	6
Ausio Yamaha	Yamaha	120	(Spain) Oriol Casas	7, 9
Ausio Yamaha	Yamaha	199	(Spain) Jorge Zaragoza	11–16, 18–19
HSF Logistics Motorsport Team	KTM	10	(Netherlands) Calvin Vlaanderen	1–7, 13–19
HSF Logistics Motorsport Team	KTM	46	(Netherlands) Davy Pootjes	1–3, 15–19
HSF Logistics Motorsport Team	KTM	107	(Netherlands) Lars van Berkel	8–9, 11–12
HSF Logistics Motorsport Team	KTM	189	(Netherlands) Brian Bogers	All
Team HRC	Honda	14	(Australia) Jed Beaton	13–14, 18–19
Team HRC	Honda	28	(Japan) Chihiro Notsuka	1–3
Team HRC	Honda	107	(Netherlands) Lars van Berkel	6–7
Team HRC	Honda	127	(Venezuela) Anthony Rodriguez	11–12
Team HRC	Honda	479	(Japan) Taiki Koga	15–16
Team HRC	Honda	747	(Italy) Michele Cervellin	1–17
Silver Action KTM	KTM	15	(Italy) Davide Bonini	
Monster Energy DRT Kawasaki	Kawasaki	18	(Russia) Vsevolod Brylyakov	1–8
Monster Energy DRT Kawasaki	Kawasaki	56	(United States) Marshal Weltin	13–14
Monster Energy DRT Kawasaki	Kawasaki	57	(United States) Darian Sanayei	1–11, 13–19
Rockstar Energy Husqvarna Factory Racing	Husqvarna	19	(Denmark) Thomas Kjær Olsen	All
Rockstar Energy Husqvarna Factory Racing	Husqvarna	64	(United States) Thomas Covington	All
Rockstar Energy Husqvarna Factory Racing	Husqvarna	426	(United Kingdom) Conrad Mewse	1–3, 5–7, 9–16, 18–19
STC Racing	Husqvarna	29	(Germany) Henry Jacobi	5–9, 11–19
STC Racing	KTM	957	(Switzerland) Nico Seiler	15
LRT KTM	KTM	33	(Belgium) Julien Lieber	All
Red Bull KTM Factory Racing	KTM	41	(Latvia) Pauls Jonass	All
Red Bull KTM Factory Racing	KTM	61	(Spain) Jorge Prado	All
Hitachi KTM UK	KTM	42	(New Zealand) Josiah Natzke	15–16
Hitachi KTM UK	KTM	919	(United Kingdom) Ben Watson	1–16, 18–19
Monster Energy Kawasaki Racing Team	Kawasaki	44	(Italy) Morgan Lesiardo	8, 13–14, 16–18
Monster Energy Kawasaki Racing Team	Kawasaki	109	(France) Yannick Fabre	3
Monster Energy Kawasaki Racing Team	Kawasaki	118	(France) Stephen Rubini	1–4, 8–9, 11–19
Monster Energy Kawasaki Racing Team	Kawasaki	152	(Bulgaria) Petar Petrov	1, 5–8, 10–11
Monster Energy Kawasaki Racing Team	Kawasaki	811	(United Kingdom) Adam Sterry	1–6
iFly JK Racing	Yamaha	48	(Australia) Jay Wilson	1–3, 5–6
iFly JK Racing	Yamaha	116	(Sweden) Oskar Olsson	11, 13–14, 16
iFly JK Racing	Yamaha	480	(Sweden) Ken Bengtson	14, 18
iFly JK Racing	Yamaha	714	(United Kingdom) Brad Todd	19
Husqvarna 8Biano Racing	Husqvarna	66	(Spain) Iker Larranaga	1–4, 10–15
Husqvarna 8Biano Racing	Husqvarna	132	(Estonia) Karel Kutsar	5
Husqvarna 8Biano Racing	Husqvarna	142	(Bulgaria) Ivan Petrov	1–7
Husqvarna 8Biano Racing	Husqvarna	170	(Australia) Caleb Ward	1–3, 6
Husqvarna 8Biano Racing	Husqvarna	223	(Italy) Giuseppe Tropepe	10–16, 18–19
Husqvarna 8Biano Racing	Husqvarna	397	(Italy) Gabriele Arbini	5–6
F&H Racing Team	Kawasaki	67	(Norway) Magne Klingsheim	1–16, 18–19
F&H Racing Team	Kawasaki	76	(Spain) Ruben Fernandez	13, 16, 18
F&H Racing Team	Kawasaki	338	(France) David Herbreteau	5–13
Maurer GEP Husqvarna	Husqvarna	81	(Germany) Brian Hsu	5–9, 11, 13–16
Team Suzuki World MX2	Suzuki	91	(Switzerland) Jeremy Seewer	All
Team Suzuki World MX2	Suzuki	96	(Australia) Hunter Lawrence	1–10, 13–19
Team Suzuki World MX2	Suzuki	98	(Netherlands) Bas Vaessen	1–3, 7–14
Team Suzuki World MX2	Suzuki	101	(France) Zach Pichon	16, 19
Vamo Racing Team	Honda	95	(Netherlands) Micha-Boy de Waal	6–9, 11–16, 18–19
Vamo Racing Team	Honda	97	(Bulgaria) Michael Ivanov	1, 5–9
Vamo Racing Team	Honda	107	(Netherlands) Lars van Berkel	3, 5
Marchetti Racing Team KTM	KTM	128	(Italy) Ivo Monticelli	1–9, 13, 19
Italian Factory Racing	KTM	211	(Italy) Nicholas Lapucci	
JTECH Racing Suzuki	Suzuki	223	(Italy) Giuseppe Tropepe	5
CEC Husqvarna Sweden	Husqvarna	297	(Sweden) Anton Gole	1–9
TM Factory Racing Team	TM	297	(Sweden) Anton Gole	11–19
TM Factory Racing Team	TM	321	(Italy) Samuele Bernardini	1–8
Wild Card Teams & Riders
Team	Constructor	No	Rider	Rounds
Monster Energy Pro Circuit Kawasaki	Kawasaki	5	(United States) Justin Hill	17
Monster Energy Pro Circuit Kawasaki	Kawasaki	92	(United States) Adam Cianciarulo	17
	KTM	13	(Indonesia) Arjuna Wicaksana	2
Penrite CRF Honda Racing	Honda	23	(Australia) Kyle Webster	2
GEICO Honda	Honda	31	(United States) RJ Hampshire	17
GEICO Honda	Honda	486	(United States) Chase Sexton	17
Steels Dr Jack KTM	KTM	35	(Italy) Alessandro Lentini	15
ASTES4-TESAR Yamaha	Yamaha	39	(Netherlands) Roan van de Moosdijk	13–14
ASTES4-TESAR Yamaha	Yamaha	166	(Latvia) Karlis Sabulis	13–14
SM Action-Erzetta Yamaha	Yamaha	40	(Italy) Simone Zecchina	
SM Action-Erzetta Yamaha	Yamaha	722	(Italy) Michael Mantovani	5–7, 19
SM Action-Erzetta Yamaha	Yamaha	951	(Italy) Simone Furlotti	8
Globbz KTM France	KTM	43	(France) Natanael Bres	13
Rocky Mountain ATV KTM	KTM	70	(United States) Dakota Alix	17
Sahkar KTM	KTM	75	(Estonia) Hardi Roosiorg	5–8, 14
Sahkar KTM	KTM	931	(Belgium) Jago Geerts	14, 18
Modiform MX Team	Kawasaki	78	(Netherlands) Roy van Heugten	14, 18
Falcon Motorsports KTM	KTM	83	(Belgium) Nathan Renkens	5–9, 11–16, 18–19
Gebben Van Venrooy Kawasaki	Kawasaki	85	(Netherlands) Marcel Conijn	18
CreyMert Racing Team	KTM	88	(Netherlands) Freek van der Vlist	2, 5–12, 14
MX Slovakia	KTM	102	(Slovakia) Richard Sikyna	9, 11, 13
	KTM	105	(Indonesia) Rizky Kusparwanto	2
DIGA-Process Husqvarna	Husqvarna	107	(Netherlands) Lars van Berkel	14–16, 18
Team VHR KTM	KTM	110	(France) Alexis Verhaeghe	10–11
RPM Kawasaki Argentina	Kawasaki	111	(Argentina) Víctor Garrido	3
	Suzuki	122	(Argentina) Benjamin Cassano	3
	Kawasaki	123	(Indonesia) Joshua Pattipi	2
KTM Spain	KTM	124	(Spain) Simeo Ubach	16
	Kawasaki	129	(Zambia) Bradley Lionnet	17
Andre Motors KTM	KTM	130	(Netherlands) Rene de Jong	18
APJ Racing Team	Yamaha	131	(Croatia) Luka Crnkovic	7, 11, 15, 19
Sõmerpalu MK	Husqvarna	132	(Estonia) Karel Kutsar	6–8
EVS Sports	Husqvarna	140	(United States) Austin Root	17
Suzuki Derco Chile	Suzuki	143	(Chile) Sebastian Muñoz	3
DPH Motorsport	Yamaha	145	(Australia) Hayden Mellross	17
Carvalho Racing Team	Yamaha	146	(Portugal) Pedro Carvalho	12
STR Yamaha	Yamaha	154	(United States) Brandon Scharer	17
RPM Cross	KTM	155	(Argentina) Nicolas Mana	3
Cycle Trader Rock River Yamaha	Yamaha	183	(Venezuela) Lorenzo Locurcio	17
Star Racing Yamaha	Yamaha	191	(United States) Justin Cooper	17
Star Racing Yamaha	Yamaha	245	(United States) Mitchell Harrison	17
Muni Motorsport PHX	Honda	197	(Argentina) Ignacio Toya	3
Proformance Husqvarna	Husqvarna	218	(Australia) Aaron Tanti	2
Maggiora Park KTM	KTM	220	(Italy) Lorenzo Ravera	11
	Husqvarna	225	(Indonesia) Muhammad Alfarizi	2
Lakerveld Racing Team	Yamaha	228	(Netherlands) Kay Ebben	18
Team Carey	Yamaha	266	(United States) Gavin Wilkins	17
Team Carey	Kawasaki	646	(United States) Nicholas Hancher	17
JD 191 KTM	KTM	313	(Czech Republic) Petr Polak	13
Custom MX Supply	Yamaha	345	(United States) Joshua Prior	17
Garin MX Team	Husqvarna	372	(Russia) Ivan Baranov	10
Freytes Motorsport	Honda	375	(Argentina) Julian Seibel	3
Sturm Racing Team	KTM	377	(Czech Republic) Martin Krč	8
GSM Yamaha	Yamaha	411	(France) Nicolas Dercourt	9
Motolabo Suzuki France	Suzuki	520	(France) Jimmy Clochet	19
Ice Queen Cryo KTM	KTM	555	(Russia) Artem Guryev	10
Caparvi Racing Team	Yamaha	600	(San Marino) Bryan Toccaceli	11
KTM Argentina	KTM	611	(Argentina) Nahuel Kriger	3
WZ Racing Team	KTM	637	(Latvia) Tomass Sileika	7
	Honda	640	(United States) Aaron Zielfelder	17
Karlstrom's Motor Husqvarna	Husqvarna	692	(Sweden) Danne Karlsson	16
Husqvarna MX Academy	Husqvarna	783	(France) Enzo Toriani	5–6, 8–9, 15, 19
Cepelak Racing Team	Yamaha	881	(Czech Republic) Dusan Drdaj	13
H4 Caluori Racing Team	Kawasaki	949	(Switzerland) Alessandro Contessi	15

=== Riders Championship ===
Pos	Rider	Bike	QAT (Qatar)		INS (Indonesia)		ARG (Argentina)		MEX (Mexico)		TRE (Italy)		NED (Netherlands)		LAT (Latvia)		GER (Germany)		FRA (France)		RUS (Russia)		ITA (Italy)		POR (Portugal)		CZE (Czech Republic)		BEL (Belgium)		SUI (Switzerland)		SWE (Sweden)		USA (United States)		NED (Netherlands)		FRA (France)		Points
1	(Latvia) Jonass	KTM	1	1	14	25	1	1	5	2	1	2	1	1	3	1	2	5	1	2	2	3	6	1	1	2	2	1	1	5	3	3	3	3	10	5	1	7	5	3	771
2	(Switzerland) Seewer	Suzuki	12	5	1	2	5	2	1	4	9	4	4	2	2	Ret	1	4	2	3	7	1	1	2	2	1	5	2	3	4	1	5	2	2	9	3	5	2	2	5	732
3	(Denmark) Kjær Olsen	Husqvarna	4	4	6	5	4	7	7	7	5	6	9	4	1	2	3	12	7	8	1	20	10	6	4	5	4	13	7	3	6	6	9	4	5	11	8	3	7	12	579
4	(United States) Covington	Husqvarna	8	Ret	22	8	8	20	4	1	11	3	3	Ret	6	17	14	1	11	7	9	16	4	3	3	3	1	10	9	Ret	7	2	16	1	2	4	3	13	1	2	532
5	(France) Paturel	Yamaha	2	2	5	11	2	9	2	8	Ret	13	7	9	11	6	Ret	2	3	1	3	12	2	7	6	4	6	3	4	8	2	1	7	7							504
6	(Belgium) Lieber	KTM	3	3	3	4	16	5	3	3	3	5	2	Ret	8	8	10	6	4	6	11	5	3	10	5	Ret	18	5	5	2	5	21	13	Ret	Ret	7	9	8	6	Ret	490
7	(Spain) Prado	KTM	7	11	21	18	3	3	19	20	2	1	17	23	4	5	12	10	6	5	15	4	18	DNS	Ret	DNS	3	6	2	1	4	4	1	5	Ret	DNS	2	1	14	7	460
8	(Netherlands) Bogers	KTM	15	13	27	3	11	16	Ret	10	19	7	19	10	21	9	7	7	13	11	6	2	5	9	7	6	7	4	12	9	17	11	5	14	7	10	7	5	15	6	407
9	(Australia) Lawrence	Suzuki	18	6	24	16	13	18	11	14	Ret	11	10	5	10	26	4	3	5	4	4	11					8	8	11	10	Ret	7	12	6	3	2	10	6	4	1	395
10	(Belgium) Van Doninck	Yamaha	17	7	4	13	7	6	8	5	12	9	5	3	Ret	14	13	Ret	Ret	Ret	Ret	DNS	9	12	9	7	Ret	16	10	12	15	14	15	13	11	6	Ret	10	Ret	DNS	309
11	(United States) Sanayei	Kawasaki	10	12	17	Ret	6	4	17	16	16	18	15	11	7	7	9	9	14	13	18	13	Ret	24			Ret	7	15	17	10	9	6	9	13	14	Ret	18	11	11	280
12	(Italy) Cervellin	Honda	6	8	Ret	9	9	11	9	11	6	23	18	14	Ret	19	6	8	20	12	16	DNS	12	15	15	9	13	14	18	14	8	12	11	11	Ret	12					263
13	(Netherlands) Vlaanderen	KTM	23	15	12	Ret	12	13	6	12	7	Ret	6	7	5	4											12	Ret	14	6	9	10	10	10	DNS	DNS	4	4	16	10	261
14	(Sweden) Östlund	Yamaha	13	10	23	23	DNS	DNS			13	21	11	13	13	10	27	16	22	15	8	6	8	5	14	12	DNS	DNS	13	13	13	13	14	19	14	13	13	11	9	13	242
15	(United Kingdom) Watson	KTM	19	Ret	9	7	19	17	16	Ret	17	15	22	12	24	13	15	Ret	12	Ret	12	7	Ret	8	8	Ret	Ret	17	6	11	11	8	8	17			11	Ret	8	15	228
16	(United Kingdom) Mewse	Husqvarna	24	21	15	24	27	26			10	16	20	22	9	3			10	9	13	17	14	20	17	19	10	12	8	7	14	18	4	8			6	12	17	16	225
17	(Russia) Brylyakov	Kawasaki	9	9	10	Ret	10	8	14	6	4	10	8	Ret	DNS	DNS	Ret	15																							129
18	(Netherlands) Vaessen	Suzuki	14	17	25	26	Ret	DNS							14	12	11	13	Ret	10	5	19	7	4	16	18	17	20	20	DNS											120
19	(Italy) Bernardini	TM	5	23	8	1	14	12	13	19	22	8	33	16	15	31	18	17																							111
20	(Germany) Jacobi	Husqvarna									27	25	13	18	12	27	8	Ret	17	17			11	Ret	13	13	Ret	Ret	16	15	18	15	21	20	Ret	18	16	16	Ret	14	108
21	(Spain) Larrañaga	Husqvarna	21	19	13	17	15	15	12	13											14	9	Ret	11	11	11	15	Ret	19	16	Ret	DNS									105
22	(Sweden) Gole	Husqvarna	20	20	11	21	26	19	15	17	14	14	Ret	21	16	15	Ret	Ret	19	18																					99
22	(Sweden) Gole	TM																					17	18	Ret	15	Ret	21	23	Ret	19	22	17	16	17	16	Ret	21	12	18	99
23	(Netherlands) Pootjes	KTM	16	16	2	14	18	Ret																							24	19	18	12	15	Ret	12	9	20	8	97
24	(Germany) Hsu	Husqvarna									8	22	32	6	18	22	5	Ret	8	21			Ret	DNS			9	18	17	20	12	Ret	19	15							97
25	(United Kingdom) Sterry	Kawasaki	11	14	Ret	6	23	10	10	9	15	DSQ	Ret	DNS																											72
26	(Australia) Beaton	Honda																									14	9	26	28							14	14	3	4	71
27	(France) Rubini	Kawasaki	22	Ret	26	19	22	21	18	15							17	Ret	9	14			Ret	21	18	Ret	22	19	Ret	DNS	16	16	22	23	12	Ret	22	Ret	Ret	9	70
28	(Italy) Monticelli	KTM	25	18	16	15	17	14	20	18	Ret	12	14	17	Ret	21	16	Ret	15	20							29	DNS											Ret	17	65
29	(Netherlands) Van der Vlist	KTM			18	10					28	27	24	15	22	18	19	14	25	Ret	17	14	19	14	Ret	DNS			DNS	DNS											52
30	(United States) Hampshire	Honda																																	1	1					50
31	(Netherlands) Van Berkel	Honda					25	23			Ret	24	16	20	20	20																									50
31	(Netherlands) Van Berkel	KTM															25	18	18	19			15	13	19	14															50
31	(Netherlands) Van Berkel	Husqvarna																											25	19	20	23	26	24			17	17			50
32	(France) Herbreteau	Kawasaki									Ret	26	Ret	Ret	23	23	29	20	16	24	10	15	Ret	19	12	10	Ret	Ret													45
33	(Norway) Klingsheim	Kawasaki	26	22	19	12	Ret	Ret	22	22	24	30	Ret	28	30	32	28	23	21	25	19	8	22	22	22	21	21	27	27	26	25	27	29	22			Ret	Ret	10	19	39
34	(Venezuela) Rodríguez	Honda																					16	16	10	8															34
35	(Bulgaria) P. Petrov	Kawasaki	DNS	DNS							21	20	12	8	17	16	DNS	DNS			Ret	DNS	DNS	DNS																	32
36	(United States) Harrison	Yamaha																																	4	9					30
37	(Italy) Tropepe	Suzuki									18	17																													30
37	(Italy) Tropepe	Husqvarna																			Ret	10	13	Ret	Ret	DNS	Ret	Ret	Ret	DNS	26	17	Ret	29			Ret	DNS	DNS	DNS	30
38	(United States) Sexton	Honda																																	6	8					28
39	(United States) Weltin	Kawasaki																									11	11	24	27											20
40	(Spain) Fernández	Kawasaki																									16	22					20	18			15	19			17
41	(Belgium) Renkens	KTM									30	31	25	25	29	29	21	22	24	22			20	Ret	21	16	25	25	Ret	23	21	20	Ret	27			23	23	13	21	15
42	(Australia) Ward	Husqvarna	DNS	DNS	7	Ret	DNS	DNS					23	Ret																											14
43	(Estonia) Kutsar	Husqvarna									25	19	30	Ret	19	11	Ret	DNS																							14
44	(United States) Cooper	Yamaha																																	8	Ret					13
45	(Italy) Lesiardo	Kawasaki															23	19									Ret	15	21	21			25	21	19	Ret	18	Ret			13
46	(Netherlands) De Waal	Honda											21	19	25	25	22	Ret	Ret	Ret			Ret	17	20	17	20	23	22	22	Ret	24	28	Ret			Ret	22	Ret	20	13
47	(Australia) Mellross	Yamaha																																	16	15					11
48	(Italy) Furlotti	Yamaha															24	11																							10
49	(Belgium) Geerts	KTM																											Ret	DNS							Ret	15			6
50	(France) Dercourt	Yamaha																	23	16																					5
51	(United States) Scharer	Yamaha																																	20	17					5
52	(France) Verhaeghe	KTM																			20	18	DNS	DNS																	4
53	(Sweden) Bengtson	Yamaha																											Ret	18							21	Ret			3
54	(Italy) Mantovani	Yamaha									29	35	28	31	31	33																							18	22	3
55	(United States) Hill	Kawasaki																																	18	DSQ					3
56	(Slovakia) Šikyňa	KTM																	26	23			23	23			19	30													2
57	(Croatia) Crnković	Yamaha													32	34							24	Ret							27	28							19	23	2
58	(Netherlands) De Jong	KTM																																			19	26			2
59	(United States) Root	Husqvarna																																	Ret	19					2
60	(Spain) Zaragoza	Yamaha																					26	26	23	20	23	Ret	Ret	Ret	22	25	27	25			25	20	Ret	DNS	2
61	(Bulgaria) I. Petrov	Husqvarna	28	25	28	27	24	25	21	21	20	33	Ret	DNS	27	30																									1
62	(Australia) Wilson	Yamaha	27	26	29	20	21	22			23	Ret	27	26																											1
63	(Bulgaria) Ivanov	Honda	DNS	DNS							26	28	26	24	28	28	20	21	Ret	Ret																					1
64	(Zambia) Lionnet	Kawasaki																																	21	20					1
65	(Australia) Tanti	Husqvarna			20	22																																			1
66	(Japan) Notsuka	Honda	29	24	30	Ret	20	Ret																																	1
67	(Netherlands) Conijn	Kawasaki																																			20	24			1
	(Italy) Ravera	KTM																					21	25																	0
	(United States) Prior	Yamaha																																	23	21					0
	(Russia) Guryev	KTM																			21	DNS																			0
	(United States) Zielfelder	Honda																																	22	22					0
	(Portugal) Carvalho	Yamaha																							Ret	22															0
	(New Zealand) Natzke	KTM																													23	Ret	23	26							0
	(United States) Wilkins	Yamaha																																	24	23					0
	(Estonia) Roosiorg	KTM									31	29	Ret	27	26	24	Ret	DNS											Ret	24											0
	(Netherlands) Van Heugten	Kawasaki																											28	29							24	25			0
	(Czech Republic) Krč	KTM															26	24																							0
	(France) Fabre	Kawasaki					28	24																																	0
	(Sweden) Karlsson	Husqvarna																															24	28							0
	(Netherlands) Van de Moosdijk	Yamaha																									30	24	Ret	DNS											0
	(France) Bres	KTM																									24	Ret													0
	(Sweden) Olsson	Yamaha																					25	Ret			28	26	Ret	Ret			32	Ret							0
	(France) Toriani	Husqvarna									33	32	29	30			Ret	25	Ret	DNS											Ret	DNS							Ret	Ret	0
	(Latvia) Sabulis	Yamaha																									Ret	Ret	29	25											0
	(Czech Republic) Drdaj	Yamaha																									26	28													0
	(Japan) Koga	Honda																													28	26	DNS	DNS							0
	(Czech Republic) Polák	KTM																									27	29													0
	(Chile) Muñoz	Suzuki					30	27																																	0
	(San Marino) Toccaceli	Yamaha																					27	Ret																	0
	(Netherlands) Ebben	Yamaha																																			Ret	27			0
	(Argentina) Kriger	KTM					29	28																																	0
	(Indonesia) Wicaksana	KTM			Ret	28																																			0
	(Switzerland) Contessi	Kawasaki																													29	30									0
	(Switzerland) Seiler	KTM																													30	29									0
	(France) Pichon	Suzuki																															30	31					Ret	DNS	0
	(Spain) Ubach	KTM																															31	30							0
	(Italy) Lentini	KTM																													31	31									0
	(Italy) Arbini	Husqvarna									32	34	31	29																											0
	(Argentina) Seibel	Honda					32	29																																	0
	(Argentina) Cassano	Suzuki					33	30																																	0
	(Argentina) Garrido	Kawasaki					31	Ret																																	0
	(Italy) Fontanesi	Yamaha											34	32																											0
	(Spain) Casas Cervera	Yamaha													33	Ret			Ret	Ret																					0
	(Argentina) Mana	KTM					34	Ret																																	0
	(Australia) Webster	Honda			Ret	Ret																																			0
	(Indonesia) Pattipi	Kawasaki			Ret	Ret																																			0
	(Indonesia) Kusparwanto	KTM			Ret	Ret																																			0
	(Indonesia) Alfarizi	Husqvarna			Ret	Ret																																			0
	(United Kingdom) Todd	Yamaha																																					Ret	Ret	0
	(Latvia) Šileika	KTM													Ret	DNS																									0
	(Russia) Baranov	Husqvarna																			Ret	DNS																			0
	(United States) Hancher	Kawasaki																																	Ret	DNS					0
	(United States) Alix	KTM																																	Ret	DNS					0
	(Argentina) Toya	Honda					DNS	DNS																																	0
	(United States) Cianciarulo	Kawasaki																																	DNS	DNS					0
	(Venezuela) Locurcio	Yamaha																																	DNS	DNS					0
	(France) Clochet	Suzuki																																					DNS	DNS	0
Pos	Rider	Bike	QAT (Qatar)		INS (Indonesia)		ARG (Argentina)		MEX (Mexico)		TRE (Italy)		NED (Netherlands)		LAT (Latvia)		GER (Germany)		FRA (France)		RUS (Russia)		ITA (Italy)		POR (Portugal)		CZE (Czech Republic)		BEL (Belgium)		SUI (Switzerland)		SWE (Sweden)		USA (United States)		NED (Netherlands)		FRA (France)		Points

Colour	Result
Gold	Winner
Silver	Second place
Bronze	Third place
Green	Points classification
Blue	Non-points classification
Blue	Non-classified finish (NC)
Purple	Retired, not classified (Ret)
Red	Did not qualify (DNQ)
Red	Did not pre-qualify (DNPQ)
Black	Disqualified (DSQ)
White	Did not start (DNS)
White	Withdrew (WD)
White	Race cancelled (C)
Blank	Did not practice (DNP)
Blank	Did not arrive (DNA)
Blank	Excluded (EX)

=== Manufacturers Championship ===
Pos	Bike	QAT (Qatar)		INS (Indonesia)		ARG (Argentina)		MEX (Mexico)		TRE (Italy)		NED (Netherlands)		LAT (Latvia)		GER (Germany)		FRA (France)		RUS (Russia)		ITA (Italy)		POR (Portugal)		CZE (Czech Republic)		BEL (Belgium)		SUI (Switzerland)		SWE (Sweden)		USA (United States)		NED (Netherlands)		FRA (France)		Points
1	KTM	1	1	2	3	1	1	3	2	1	1	1	1	3	1	2	5	1	2	2	2	3	1	1	2	2	1	1	1	3	3	1	3	7	5	1	1	5	3	848
2	Suzuki	12	5	1	2	5	2	1	4	9	4	4	2	2	12	1	3	2	3	4	1	1	2	2	1	5	2	3	4	1	5	2	2	3	2	5	2	2	1	766
3	Husqvarna	4	4	6	5	4	7	4	1	5	3	3	4	1	2	3	1	7	7	1	9	4	3	3	3	1	10	7	3	6	2	4	1	2	4	3	3	1	2	728
4	Yamaha	2	2	4	11	2	6	2	5	12	9	5	3	11	6	13	2	3	1	3	6	2	5	6	4	6	3	4	8	2	1	7	7	4	6	13	10	9	13	623
5	Kawasaki	9	9	10	6	6	4	10	6	4	10	8	8	7	7	9	9	9	13	10	8	22	19	12	10	11	7	15	17	10	9	6	9	12	14	15	18	10	9	414
6	Honda	6	8	30	9	9	11	9	11	6	23	16	14	20	19	6	8	20	12	16	DNS	12	15	10	8	13	9	18	14	8	12	11	11	1	1	14	14	3	4	370
7	TM	5	23	8	1	14	12	13	19	22	8	33	16	15	31	18	17					17	18	Ret	15	Ret	21	23	Ret	19	22	17	16	17	16	Ret	21	12	18	156
Pos	Bike	QAT (Qatar)		INS (Indonesia)		ARG (Argentina)		MEX (Mexico)		TRE (Italy)		NED (Netherlands)		LAT (Latvia)		GER (Germany)		FRA (France)		RUS (Russia)		ITA (Italy)		POR (Portugal)		CZE (Czech Republic)		BEL (Belgium)		SUI (Switzerland)		SWE (Sweden)		USA (United States)		NED (Netherlands)		FRA (France)		Points

Colour	Result
Gold	Winner
Silver	Second place
Bronze	Third place
Green	Points classification
Blue	Non-points classification
Blue	Non-classified finish (NC)
Purple	Retired, not classified (Ret)
Red	Did not qualify (DNQ)
Red	Did not pre-qualify (DNPQ)
Black	Disqualified (DSQ)
White	Did not start (DNS)
White	Withdrew (WD)
White	Race cancelled (C)
Blank	Did not practice (DNP)
Blank	Did not arrive (DNA)
Blank	Excluded (EX)

== See also ==
- 2017 FIM Women's Motocross World Championship
- 2017 European Motocross Championship
- 2017 AMA National Motocross Championship
- 2017 British Motocross Championship
