= 2015 FIM Motocross World Championship =

Motocross championship season

The 2015 FIM Motocross World Championship was the 59th F.I.M. Motocross World Championship season. It included 18 events, starting at Losail in Qatar on 28 February, and ending at San Bernardino, California in the United States on 20 September. In the main MXGP class, Tony Cairoli was the six-time defending champion, and entered the 2015 season looking to score a record seventh consecutive premier class title, for Red Bull KTM. He and Maximilian Nagl started the year strong, and as the German round rolled around Nagl had a 30 points lead over Cairoli and 38 over rookie Romain Febvre. Nagl got injured on practice and missed the next 5 rounds, ending his hopes of a maiden championship. Cairoli was struggling during the summer and ended up injured as well. Romain Febvre won the title and became the first French premier-class champion. In the MX2 class, Jordi Tixier was the defending champion, after taking the title in the final race of the 2014 season, also for Red Bull KTM. Tixier defends his title with Team Monster Energy Kawasaki.

== Race calendar and results ==
An 18-round calendar for the 2015 season was announced on 10 October 2014. In February 2015, it was announced that the Brazilian event – scheduled to be held on 16 August in Trindade – had been cancelled due to financial and political issues. A replacement event was scheduled in Mantova, Italy.

=== MXGP ===
Round	Date	Grand Prix	Location	Race 1 Winner	Race 2 Winner	Round Winner
1	28 February	Qatar	Losail	(Germany) Max Nagl	(Germany) Max Nagl	(Germany) Max Nagl
2	8 March	Thailand	Nakhon Chai Si	(United States) Ryan Villopoto	(Italy) Tony Cairoli	(United States) Ryan Villopoto
3	29 March	Argentina	Neuquén	(Belgium) Clément Desalle	(Germany) Max Nagl	(Germany) Max Nagl
4	19 April	Italy	Arco di Trento	(Italy) Tony Cairoli	(Germany) Max Nagl	(Germany) Max Nagl
5	26 April	Netherlands	Valkenswaard	(France) Gautier Paulin	(France) Gautier Paulin	(France) Gautier Paulin
6	10 May	Spain	Talavera de la Reina	(Germany) Max Nagl	(Italy) Tony Cairoli	(Italy) Tony Cairoli
7	24 May	United Kingdom	Winchester	(Italy) Tony Cairoli	(France) Romain Febvre	(Italy) Tony Cairoli
8	31 May	France	Villars-sous-Écot	(Italy) Tony Cairoli	(France) Romain Febvre	(France) Romain Febvre
9	14 June	Italy	Maggiora	(France) Romain Febvre	(Belgium) Kevin Strijbos	(France) Romain Febvre
10	21 June	Germany	Teutschenthal	(France) Romain Febvre	(France) Gautier Paulin	(France) Romain Febvre
11	5 July	Sweden	Uddevalla	(France) Romain Febvre	(France) Romain Febvre	(France) Romain Febvre
12	12 July	Latvia	Ķegums	(Netherlands) Glenn Coldenhoff	(France) Romain Febvre	(Netherlands) Glenn Coldenhoff
13	26 July	Czech Republic	Loket	(France) Romain Febvre	(France) Romain Febvre	(France) Romain Febvre
14	2 August	Belgium	Lommel	(United Kingdom) Shaun Simpson	(United Kingdom) Shaun Simpson	(United Kingdom) Shaun Simpson
15	16 August	Italy	Mantova	(France) Romain Febvre	(France) Romain Febvre	(France) Romain Febvre
16	30 August	Netherlands	Assen	(United Kingdom) Shaun Simpson	(France) Romain Febvre	(United Kingdom) Shaun Simpson
17	13 September	Mexico	León	(France) Romain Febvre	(France) Romain Febvre	(France) Romain Febvre
18	20 September	United States	Glen Helen	(France) Romain Febvre	(United States) Josh Grant	(France) Romain Febvre

=== MX2 ===
Round	Date	Grand Prix	Location	Race 1 Winner	Race 2 Winner	Round Winner
1	28 February	Qatar	Losail	(Netherlands) Jeffrey Herlings	(Netherlands) Jeffrey Herlings	(Netherlands) Jeffrey Herlings
2	8 March	Thailand	Nakhon Chai Si	(Netherlands) Jeffrey Herlings	(Netherlands) Jeffrey Herlings	(Netherlands) Jeffrey Herlings
3	29 March	Argentina	Neuquén	(France) Dylan Ferrandis	(Netherlands) Jeffrey Herlings	(France) Dylan Ferrandis
4	19 April	Italy	Arco di Trento	(Netherlands) Jeffrey Herlings	(Slovenia) Tim Gajser	(Slovenia) Tim Gajser
5	26 April	Netherlands	Valkenswaard	(Netherlands) Jeffrey Herlings	(Netherlands) Jeffrey Herlings	(Netherlands) Jeffrey Herlings
6	10 May	Spain	Talavera de la Reina	(Netherlands) Jeffrey Herlings	(Switzerland) Valentin Guillod	(Switzerland) Valentin Guillod
7	24 May	United Kingdom	Winchester	(Netherlands) Jeffrey Herlings	(Switzerland) Valentin Guillod	(Switzerland) Valentin Guillod
8	31 May	France	Villars-sous-Écot	(Netherlands) Jeffrey Herlings	(Netherlands) Jeffrey Herlings	(Netherlands) Jeffrey Herlings
9	14 June	Italy	Maggiora	(Russia) Aleksandr Tonkov	(Netherlands) Jeffrey Herlings	(Slovenia) Tim Gajser
10	21 June	Germany	Teutschenthal	(Slovenia) Tim Gajser	(United Kingdom) Max Anstie	(Slovenia) Tim Gajser
11	5 July	Sweden	Uddevalla	(Netherlands) Jeffrey Herlings	(Slovenia) Tim Gajser	(Slovenia) Tim Gajser
12	12 July	Latvia	Ķegums	(United Kingdom) Max Anstie	(United Kingdom) Max Anstie	(United Kingdom) Max Anstie
13	26 July	Czech Republic	Loket	(United Kingdom) Max Anstie	(Switzerland) Valentin Guillod	(Switzerland) Valentin Guillod
14	2 August	Belgium	Lommel	(United Kingdom) Max Anstie	(United Kingdom) Max Anstie	(United Kingdom) Max Anstie
15	16 August	Italy	Mantova	(United Kingdom) Max Anstie	(United Kingdom) Max Anstie	(United Kingdom) Max Anstie
16	30 August	Netherlands	Assen	(Slovenia) Tim Gajser	(United Kingdom) Max Anstie	(Slovenia) Tim Gajser
17	13 September	Mexico	León	(Latvia) Pauls Jonass	(United States) Thomas Covington	(United States) Thomas Covington
18	20 September	United States	Glen Helen	(United States) Jessy Nelson	(United States) Jessy Nelson	(United States) Jessy Nelson

== Participants ==
=== Rider Changes ===
- Gautier Paulin lost his factory Monster Energy Kawasaki ride, but moved over to the factory Honda.
- Steven Frossard also lost his factory Kawasaki ride. He moved to KTM team, Wilvo Forkrent and will compete in the British national MX1 as well as MXGP.
- Monster Energy Kawasaki signed multi-American champion Ryan Villopoto and 2008 MX2 World Champion Tyla Rattray.
- Red Bull KTM expand to three machines and sign Tommy Searle.
- Max Nagl lost his HRC Honda ride and moved over to the factory Red Bull IceOne Husqvarna.
- Nathan Watson is signed at IceOne alongside Nagl and Todd Waters.
- 24MX Honda has a completely new lineup with aged-out MX2 rider Christophe Charlier and Swede Filip Bengtsson.
- Yamaha factory expand to three riders and sign Romain Febvre.
- Dean Ferris enters series full-time with Wilvo Nestaan Husqvarna.
- Glenn Coldenhoff moves up from MX2 with Rockstar Suzuki Europe.
- Rui Goncalves signs for the new MX Racing Team Husqvarna.
- Dennis Ullrich leaves Sarholz KTM to join Castrol Power1 Suzuki. He is replaced by fellow German Angus Heidecke.
- Milko Potisek joins Tip Top Racing.
- Alessandro Lupino and Kei Yamamoto move up from MX2 with Assomotor Honda. José Butrón also moves up with Marchetti KTM

=== MXGP ===
Team	Constructor	No	Rider	Rounds
Monster Energy Kawasaki Racing Team	Kawasaki	2	(United States) Ryan Villopoto	1–4
Monster Energy Kawasaki Racing Team	Kawasaki	28	(South Africa) Tyla Rattray	All
Monster Energy Kawasaki Racing Team	Kawasaki	35	(United States) Josh Grant	18
Monster Energy Kawasaki Racing Team	Kawasaki	121	(France) Xavier Boog	7–8
Monster Energy Kawasaki Racing Team	Kawasaki	183	(France) Steven Frossard	12, 15
GM Racing	Husqvarna	8	(Belgium) Mike Vanderstraeten	5, 14–15
Red Bull KTM Factory Racing	KTM	9	(Belgium) Ken De Dycker	1–10
Red Bull KTM Factory Racing	KTM	100	(United Kingdom) Tommy Searle	1–2, 4–6, 11–14, 18
Red Bull KTM Factory Racing	KTM	222	(Italy) Tony Cairoli	1–12, 18
24MX Honda	Honda	11	(Sweden) Filip Bengtsson	1–6, 11–16
24MX Honda	Honda	23	(France) Christophe Charlier	1–16
Red Bull IceOne Husqvarna Factory Racing	Husqvarna	12	(Germany) Max Nagl	1–10, 15–18
Red Bull IceOne Husqvarna Factory Racing	Husqvarna	47	(Australia) Todd Waters	All
Red Bull IceOne Husqvarna Factory Racing	Husqvarna	991	(United Kingdom) Nathan Watson	1–3, 11–16
GK Kawasaki	Kawasaki	13	(Netherlands) Mike Gijsbertsen	16
Marchetti KTM	KTM	17	(Spain) José Butrón	All
DP19 Racing	Yamaha	19	(Italy) David Philippaerts	1–13, 15–16
Sturm Racing Kawasaki	Kawasaki	20	(France) Gregory Aranda	4, 8, 10, 13
Team HRC	Honda	21	(France) Gautier Paulin	All
Team HRC	Honda	777	(Russia) Evgeny Borbryshev	All
Suzuki World MXGP	Suzuki	22	(Belgium) Kevin Strijbos	1–2, 6, 9–14
Suzuki World MXGP	Suzuki	25	(Belgium) Clément Desalle	1–9, 13–14
Hitachi Construction Machinery Revo KTM	KTM	24	(United Kingdom) Shaun Simpson	All
Speedequipement Racing Sports	Suzuki	26	(Sweden) Rasmus Sjoberg	11
	Yamaha	31	(Thailand) Chaiyan Romphan	2
Tip Top Racing Team	Yamaha	32	(France) Milko Potisek	
	Honda	36	(Thailand) Arnon Theplib	2
	Honda	37	(Argentina) Marcos Guiral	3
	Honda	38	(Greece) Panagiotis Kouzis	10–11, 13–14
TM Racing Factory Team	TM	39	(Italy) Davide Guarneri	1–7, 12–16, 18
LPE Kawasaki	Kawasaki	40	(Estonia) Tanel Leok	4–5, 12, 14
Team Massignani Honda	Honda	43	(Italy) Davide de Bortoli	4
Team Massignani Honda	Honda	690	(Italy) Federico Bracesco	15
Wilvo Forkrent KTM	KTM	45	(United Kingdom) Jake Nicholls	11–14
Wilvo Forkrent KTM	KTM	183	(France) Steven Frossard	1–9
Wilvo Forkrent KTM	KTM	811	(United Kingdom) Adam Sterry	17–18
BRT KTM	KTM	50	(Republic of Ireland) Martin Barr	5
Heads and Threads Suzuki	Suzuki	55	(Republic of Ireland) Graeme Irwin	7
KTM Motocross Racing Team	KTM	56	(Australia) Kirk Gibbs	18
	Honda	58	(Argentina) Nicolás Carranza	3
62 Motorsport Husqvarna	Husqvarna	62	(Slovenia) Klemen Gercar	4, 6–10, 13–16
HSF Logistics/JTX Racing	KTM	63	(Netherlands) Ceriel Klein Kromhof	5
	Yamaha	66	(Argentina) Marco Schmit	3
	Kawasaki	73	(Argentina) Gastón Barreyra	3
Team Assomotor	Honda	77	(Italy) Alessandro Lupino	1–12
Team Assomotor	Honda	400	(Japan) Kei Yamamoto	All
Yamaha Factory Racing	Yamaha	89	(Belgium) Jeremy van Horebeek	1–4, 7–18
Yamaha Factory Racing	Yamaha	461	(France) Romain Febvre	All
	KTM	90	(Belgium) Nick Triest	5
	Kawasaki	96	(Mexico) Alexis Garza	17
Penrite Honda Racing	Honda	101	(New Zealand) Ben Townley	18
Penrite Honda Racing	Honda	902	(New Zealand) Cody Cooper	18
Pro Tork Racing Team	Kawasaki	103	(Brazil) Antonio Balbi	18
Team JE68	KTM	104	(Sweden) Kim Lindstrom	11
Wilvo Nestaan Husqvarna Factory Racing	Husqvarna	111	(Australia) Dean Ferris	1–8, 10–18
GL12 Racing	Yamaha	112	(United Kingdom) Lewis Gregory	7
BTO Sports KTM	KTM	118	(United States) Davi Millsaps	18
2b Yamaha	Yamaha	120	(France) Cedric Soubeyras	4, 8
Bud Racing Kawasaki	Kawasaki	121	(France) Xavier Boog	4–6
	KTM	123	(Japan) Yutaka Hoshino	2
KTM Factory Racing USA	KTM	125	(France) Marvin Musquin	18
KTM Factory Racing USA	KTM	215	(United Kingdom) Dean Wilson	18
	Suzuki	147	(Sweden) Jesper Jonsson	11, 18
Castrol Power1 Suzuki	Suzuki	149	(Germany) Dennis Ullrich	4–8, 10–11, 13–14
Sarholz KTM	KTM	156	(Germany) Angus Heidecke	4–5, 8, 10–11, 13–16
	Suzuki	159	(Mexico) Eduardo Martinez	17
KMP Honda	Honda	167	(Republic of Ireland) Stuart Edmonds	10, 16
KMP Honda	Honda	926	(Belgium) Jeremy Delince	10, 16
Team Caparvi	Yamaha	173	(Italy) Pier Filippo Bertuzzo	4, 8–10, 13, 15
JK Racing Yamaha	Yamaha	174	(United Kingdom) Alfie Smith	15
JK Racing Yamaha	Yamaha	177	(United Kingdom) Paul Coates	1–2
Star Racing Yamaha	Yamaha	175	(United States) Cooper Webb	18
	Honda	181	(Argentina) Demián Villar	3
	KTM	185	(Belgium) Kevin Wouts	16
	Yamaha	191	(Japan) Daiki Kamakura	2
GDI Husqvarna	Husqvarna	194	(Netherlands) Rick Satink	5
SDS Racing	Yamaha	212	(Belgium) Jeffrey Dewulf	5, 8, 14, 16
	Kawasaki	214	(Italy) Samuel Zeni	4
Honda Racing Estonia	Honda	221	(Estonia) Priit Rätsep	14
	Kawasaki	224	(France) Morgan Jacquelin	8
	Yamaha	225	(Mexico) Eduardo Andrade	17
Tibro MC-Service	Honda	231	(Sweden) Nicklas Gustavsson	11
Fury Moto	Kawasaki	250	(France) Richard Fura	7
Team Suzuki Europe Motocross	Suzuki	259	(Netherlands) Glenn Coldenhoff	All
	Suzuki	287	(United States) Kyle Engle	15–16
	Yamaha	289	(Slovenia) Matevz Irt	9, 15
Rockstar Energy Husqvarna Factory	Husqvarna	312	(United States) Jason Anderson	18
Buildbase Honda	Honda	337	(Estonia) Gert Krestinov	14
Jimmy Joe Husqvarna	Husqvarna	349	(Denmark) Nikolaj Larsen	16
	Suzuki	410	(Argentina) Braian Selles	3
	Yamaha	411	(Argentina) Ezequiel Fanello	3
	Kawasaki	447	(United States) Deven Raper	18
Cand D Motorsports	KTM	453	(United States) Jordan Reynolds	18
JB Racing	Honda	474	(Belgium) Bryan Boulard	15–16
RMX Honda	Honda	482	(United States) Riley Brough	18
	Suzuki	494	(Argentina) Flávio Sastre	3
SLMX School 505	Kawasaki	505	(Guam) Sean Lipanovich	18
	Honda	512	(Argentina) Franco Calveras	3
	Yamaha	515	(Switzerland) Kim Schaffter	8
	Suzuki	520	(Mexico) Donovan Garcia	17
	Honda	525	(Ecuador) Andres Benenaula	17
	Kawasaki	600	(Latvia) Davis Ivanovs	4, 7, 11–12
Aguilar Racing	Suzuki	631	(Ecuador) Justiniano Romero	17
Compression Generation Services	Honda	655	(Canada) John Pauk	18
	Kawasaki	713	(France) Anthony Guidolin	8
KTM UAE	KTM	731	(United Kingdom) Jake Shipton	1
BELOGORIE Russia Racing	KTM	742	(Russia) Maxim Nazarov	12
	Honda	750	(United States) Jared Hicks	18
Motoconcepts/Smartop Suzuki	Suzuki	800	(United States) Mike Alessi	7–8
Team Dirt Candy	Suzuki	869	(Sweden) Robert Lind	18
SR Motoblouz	Honda	871	(France) Fabien Izoird	8
	KTM	893	(Argentina) Joaquín Poli	3
	Suzuki	901	(Argentina) Joaquín Fernández	3
OB1 Motorsport	Suzuki	903	(France) Nicolas Aubin	8–9
Cofain Racing KTM	KTM	909	(Austria) Lukas Neurauter	10, 13
	Kawasaki	912	(Chile) Eric Riesle	3
	Kawasaki	921	(Chile) Óscar Riesle	3
	Suzuki	925	(Argentina) Jeremías Fernández	3
LM952	Suzuki	952	(France) Ludovic Macler	15–16
	KTM	957	(United Kingdom) Jake Preston	1
	Suzuki	969	(United States) Shawn Rhinehart	18
Team Honda MX Sweden	Honda	996	(Sweden) Filip Thuresson	11
MX Racing Team	Husqvarna	999	(Portugal) Rui Gonçalves	1–7, 16

=== MX2 ===
Team	Constructor	No	Rider	Rounds
Team Monster Energy Kawasaki	Kawasaki	1	(France) Jordi Tixier	1–2, 4–15
Team Monster Energy Kawasaki	Kawasaki	4	(France) Dylan Ferrandis	1–6
Team Monster Energy Kawasaki	Kawasaki	64	(United States) Thomas Covington	All
Team Monster Energy Kawasaki	Kawasaki	152	(Bulgaria) Petar Petrov	7–10, 13–18
Team Monster Energy Kawasaki	Kawasaki	338	(France) David Herbreteau	3, 8, 11
	Yamaha	5	(Italy) Nicola Recchia	9, 15
Kemea Yamaha Racing Team	Yamaha	6	(France) Benoît Paturel	All
Kemea Yamaha Racing Team	Yamaha	7	(Belgium) Damon Graulus	1–2, 8–9, 15
Kemea Yamaha Racing Team	Yamaha	172	(Belgium) Brent Van Doninck	3–7, 9–18
HSF Logistics Motorsport Team	KTM	10	(Netherlands) Calvin Vlaanderen	17–18
HSF Logistics Motorsport Team	KTM	95	(Latvia) Roberts Justs	1–13
HSF Logistics Motorsport Team	KTM	189	(Netherlands) Brian Bogers	1–6, 9–18
SDM Racing	Husqvarna	15	(Italy) Davide Bonini	4, 9, 13, 15–16
	KTM	16	(Thailand) Trakarn Thangthong	2
Honda Jtech	Honda	18	(Russia) Vsevolod Brylyakov	1–14
Honda Jtech	Honda	51	(Belgium) Jens Getteman	1–8, 12–15
Honda Jtech	Honda	377	(France) Jordan Lacan	10–11
Sarholz KTM	KTM	29	(Germany) Henry Jacobi	4–5, 7–10, 12–16
CEC Scandinavian Racing Sports	KTM	30	(Sweden) Eddie Hjortmarker	4, 8–10
Standing Construct Yamaha	Yamaha	33	(Belgium) Julien Lieber	All
Standing Construct Yamaha	Yamaha	92	(Switzerland) Valentin Guillod	All
Red Bull KTM Factory Racing	KTM	41	(Latvia) Pauls Jonass	All
Red Bull KTM Factory Racing	KTM	84	(Netherlands) Jeffrey Herlings	1–11
Red Bull KTM Factory Racing	KTM	85	(Netherlands) Davy Pootjes	9–14, 16
	Honda	48	(Thailand) Jugkrit Suksripaisan	2
	KTM	53	(Netherlands) Micha-Boy De Waal	9, 14–16
Wilvo Nestaan Husqvarna Factory Racing	Husqvarna	59	(Russia) Aleksandr Tonkov	1–10
Wilvo Nestaan Husqvarna Factory Racing	Husqvarna	151	(Finland) Harri Kullas	12–18
Martin Honda Junior Team	Honda	60	(San Marino) Bryan Toccaceli	9, 15
Martin Honda Junior Team	Honda	747	(Italy) Michele Cervellin	15
	Suzuki	61	(Argentina) Nahuel Kriger	3, 17–18
Monster Energy Pro Circuit Kawasaki	Kawasakii	65	(United States) Chris Alldredge	18
Troy Lee Designs Lucas Oil Red Bull KTM	KTM	70	(United States) Shane McElrath	18
Troy Lee Designs Lucas Oil Red Bull KTM	KTM	79	(United States) Jessy Nelson	18
MX Racing Team	Husqvarna	71	(Switzerland) Christopher Valente	1–8
MX Racing Team	Husqvarna	97	(Bulgaria) Maykal Grisha Ivanov	4–13, 15–16
MX Racing Team	Husqvarna	122	(Italy) Nicholas Lapucci	9, 15–16
MX Racing Team	Husqvarna	200	(Italy) Filippo Zonta	15
MX Racing Team	Husqvarna	274	(Sweden) Anton Lundgren	1–6, 11–16
	Kawasaki	74	(Thailand) Phanuphong Somsawat	2
	Honda	75	(Thailand) Piyanat Koetsiri	2
	Suzuki	76	(Thailand) Jaturong Jomjaturong	2
Team Suzuki Europe Motocross	Suzuki	81	(Germany) Brian Hsu	17–18
Team Suzuki Europe Motocross	Suzuki	91	(Switzerland) Jeremy Seewer	All
Team Suzuki Europe Motocross	Suzuki	98	(Netherlands) Bas Vaessen	18
	Kawasaki	86	(Chile) Felipe Danke	3
RB Racing Suzuki	Suzuki	93	(United Kingdom) Gradie Featherstone	1–2, 5, 7
	Honda	94	(Chile) Javier Vásquez	3
Monster Energy DRT Kawasaki	Kawasaki	99	(United Kingdom) Max Anstie	1, 3–18
Monster Energy DRT Kawasaki	Kawasaki	119	(United Kingdom) Mel Pocock	1–2
Honda Gariboldi	Honda	101	(Spain) Jorge Zaragoza	6–13
Honda Gariboldi	Honda	211	(France) Sullivan Jaulin	4
Honda Gariboldi	Honda	243	(Slovenia) Tim Gajser	All
	Honda	108	(Thailand) Napapol Veerakul	2
Team VHR	Kawasaki	110	(France) Alexis Verhaeghe	8
Team VHR	Kawasaki	872	(France) Lucas Imbert	8
	Suzuki	115	(Argentina) Juan Ignacio Fanello	3
	Honda	117	(Argentina) Juan Pablo Luzzardi	3
Marchetti KTM	KTM	128	(Italy) Ivo Monticelli	All
Sakhar KTM	KTM	132	(Estonia) Karel Kutsar	4–5, 7–10, 12–14, 16
SZA-STAV Racing Team	KTM	137	(Czech Republic) Martin Krc	13
	KTM	140	(United Kingdom) Jordan Booker	5, 7, 16
Bud Racing Kawasaki	Kawasaki	141	(France) Maxime Desprey	8
Jimmy Joe Husqvarna	Husqvarna	144	(Netherlands) Rick Folkers	16
Heads and all Threads	Suzuki	151	(Finland) Harri Kullas	5, 7
Hitachi Construction Machinery Revo KTM	KTM	152	(Bulgaria) Petar Petrov	1–6
Hitachi Construction Machinery Revo KTM	KTM	919	(United Kingdom) Ben Watson	1–16
TE Honda	Honda	155	(Japan) Gota Otsuka	2
	Honda	171	(Thailand) Thanarat Penjan	2
	Yamaha	175	(Argentina) Víctor Garrido	3
	Kawasaki	182	(United States) Theodore Pauli	18
Motocross Marketing KTM Silver Action	KTM	195	(Italy) Simone Furlotti	15
Motocross Marketing KTM Silver Action	KTM	300	(Russia) Viacheslav Golovkin	1–6, 8–16
	KTM	198	(Netherlands) Wesley Mars	16
Orion RS Petrol	KTM	202	(Czech Republic) Jonas Nedved	13
Team Massignani	Honda	223	(Italy) Giuseppe Tropepe	15
	Kawasaki	249	(Argentina) Leonardo Díaz	3
JD 191 Racing	KTM	280	(Czech Republic) Jan Vondrasek	9
JD 191 Racing	KTM	831	(Poland) Tomasz Wysocki	13, 16
	Suzuki	299	(Brazil) Kioman Muñoz	3
TM Racing Factory Team	TM	321	(Italy) Samuele Bernardini	6–18
JK Racing Yamaha	Yamaha	373	(France) Yannis Irsuti	4, 6–9
Team Leith	Kawasaki	388	(United States) Brandan Leith	18
Husqvarna Sweden	Husqvarna	470	(Sweden) Pontus Jonsson	18
Team 501	Yamaha	501	(Switzerland) Cyrill Scheiwiller	15
	Kawasaki	538	(Austria) Michael Kratzer	10, 13
Big St Charles Motorsport	Yamaha	619	(United States) Mark Weishaar	18
BELOGORIE Russia Racing	KTM	555	(Russia) Artem Guryev	1–5, 7–8
BELOGORIE Russia Racing	KTM	774	(Russia) Artemiy Nazarov	12
Mb Honda	Honda	556	(France) Simon Mallet	4, 8–9
	Suzuki	601	(Italy) Francesco Ciola	4
	Yamaha	602	(Mexico) Alejandro Rugerio	17
	Honda	614	(Argentina) Timoteo Nappi	3
	Yamaha	695	(Argentina) Nicolás Fanello	3
MRK Racing	Yamaha	707	(France) Robin Kappel	8–10
Cofain Racing KTM	KTM	766	(Austria) Pascal Rauchenecker	8, 10
	KTM	798	(Argentina) Agustin Poli	3
Wilvo Forkrent KTM	KTM	811	(United Kingdom) Adam Sterry	3, 8, 13, 15
JPM Racing	Yamaha	888	(France) Nicolas Barcelo	8
Team KFI Yamaha	Yamaha	922	(Belgium) Kevin Fors	4–13
	Kawasaki	924	(Argentina) Nicolás Callegaris	3
Team OB1	Suzuki	951	(France) Arnaud Aubin	8
	Kawasaki	993	(China) Jian Hao Xu	2

== Championship standings ==
=== MXGP ===
==== Riders' championship ====
Pos	Rider	Bike	QAT (Qatar)		THA (Thailand)		ARG (Argentina)		TRE (Italy)		NED (Netherlands)		ESP (Spain)		GBR (United Kingdom)		FRA (France)		ITA (Italy)		GER (Germany)		SWE (Sweden)		LAT (Latvia)		CZE (Czech Republic)		BEL (Belgium)		ITA (Italy)		NED (Netherlands)		MEX (Mexico)		USA (United States)		Points
1	(France) Febvre	Yamaha	6	7	3	4	8	6	7	3	10	5	4	2	7	1	2	1	1	6	1	2	1	1	8	1	1	1	3	3	1	1	5	1	1	1	1	2	735
2	(France) Paulin	Honda	4	3	7	6	6	7	5	5	1	1	5	7	6	7	30	6	14	3	3	1	5	10	3	3	7	7	2	2	4	6	2	4	4	9	8	8	592
3	(Russia) Bobryshev	Honda	8	9	10	12	5	10	8	6	3	4	6	4	4	4	3	3	8	11	2	7	29	8	11	5	2	2	5	4	2	4	3	5	3	3	9	5	567
4	(United Kingdom) Simpson	KTM	7	14	11	14	15	18	12	10	5	6	20	6	5	6	7	11	6	5	6	9	3	11	16	7	6	6	1	1	5	3	1	3	2	2	34	DNS	481
5	(Belgium) van Horebeek	Yamaha	5	5	24	24	9	5	6	29					10	9	5	9	3	9	4	4	2	5	5	9	4	5	4	9	3	2	7	7	7	4	12	7	449
6	(Germany) Nagl	Husqvarna	1	1	4	11	3	1	2	1	2	2	1	3	3	5	6	2	15	2	DNS	DNS									8	10	6	6	8	6	33	31	442
7	(Italy) Cairoli	KTM	3	4	5	1	2	2	1	2	28	7	3	1	1	3	1	7	7	18	14	6	13	3	4	4											5	30	432
8	(Netherlands) Coldenhoff	Suzuki	18	10	16	13	14	8	10	18	7	10	19	15	16	14	9	5	16	12	9	12	9	6	1	2	8	11	6	12	6	5	4	2	5	5	6	6	423
9	(Australia) Waters	Husqvarna	15	13	9	7	11	9	15	11	14	14	9	21	9	16	12	13	4	4	16	8	4	7	14	10	26	13	8	6	9	11	9	9	11	11	19	13	354
10	(Belgium) Desalle	Suzuki	2	2	2	2	1	3	3	4	4	3	2	5	2	2	31	DNS	DNS	DNS							3	3	DNS	DNS									331
11	(Australia) Ferris	Husqvarna	23	17	20	9	21	17	18	17	15	13	14	16	13	18	4	4			7	5	6	4	10	12	16	26	15	8	7	8	8	11	6	10	18	14	294
12	(Belgium) Strijbos	Suzuki	12	6	6	5							8	11					9	1	5	3	8	2	2	6	5	4	7	5									287
13	(South Africa) Rattray	Kawasaki	17	16	8	8	17	20	DNS	DNS	6	8	7	8	8	11	20	10	DSQ	13	DNS	DNS	12	12	18	21	12	8	12	7	10	9	10	26	10	7	17	12	276
14	(Spain) Butron	KTM	14	11	13	26	19	19	23	22	16	17	17	13	14	12	DNS	29	10	14	12	14	14	16	7	17	14	14	16	15	12	13	14	8	9	8	15	11	233
15	(Italy) Philippaerts	Yamaha	10	25	12	10	20	15	13	8	29	12	13	24	12	15	11	19	2	7	10	24	7	9	17	16	25	DNS			27	DNS							185
16	(France) Charlier	Honda	20	19	DNS	DNS	7	16	16	31	25	18	15	14	DNS	DNS	17	12	11	10	8	10	10	26	12	14	11	12	14	11	16	7							183
17	(Belgium) de Dycker	KTM	19	15	25	27	12	11	9	7	8	9	18	18	11	8	8	8	12	8	26	25																	155
18	(Italy) Guarneri	TM	13	12	15	16	10	12	11	9	27	DNS			DNS	DNS									22	15	20	9	24	17	11	12	13	15			14	15	139
19	(France) Frossard	KTM	11	27	28	15	13	13	32	33	11	DNS	10	17	26	10	16	14	DNS	DNS	11	11																	128
19	(France) Frossard	Kawasaki																							6	8					26	DNS							128
20	(United States) Villopoto	Kawasaki	9	8	1	3	4	4	4	30																													124
21	(Sweden) Bengtsson	Honda	22	20	27	20	18	35	17	15	9	27	25	22									16	19	9	11	15	25	10	16	13	14	11	17					107
22	(Italy) Lupino	Honda	25	21	21	22	22	22	21	14	17	19	16	9	15	13	14	30	5	20	13	13	15	14	DNS	DNS													97
23	(United Kingdom) Watson	Husqvarna	29	DNS	26	DNS	16	14															11	13	13	23	10	10	11	DNS	14	25	12	12					95
24	(United Kingdom) Searle	KTM	16	28	29	DNS			14	13	12	11	11	25									28	28	DSQ	13	9	16									13	9	94
25	(Germany) Heidecke	KTM							22	24	19	21					28	21			17	16	20	17			18	15	17	14	15	17	16	13					59
26	(United States) Grant	Kawasaki																																			3	1	45
27	(Japan) Yamamoto	Honda	26	23	18	19	23	23	26	25	31	26	23	20	20	22	23	17	20	17	21	17	24	20	21	19	21	20	21	21	19	22	22	23	13	13	20	28	43
28	(United States) Webb	Yamaha																																			2	3	42
29	(France) Boog	Kawasaki							33	21	13	15	12	10	17	19																							40
30	(Portugal) Goncalves	Husqvarna	21	18	14	17	35	21	20	12	30	29	21	12	DNS	DNS																	18	18					39
31	(United Kingdom) Wilson	KTM																																			7	4	32
32	(France) Aranda	Kawasaki							28	16							10	15			18	18					17	22											32
33	(Estonia) Krestinov	Honda																											9	10									23
34	(Germany) Ullrich	Suzuki							24	23	20	20	22	19	21	20	22	24			19	DNS	18	27			13	17	20	DNS									23
35	(Slovenia) Gercar	Husqvarna							29	32			24	23	25	24	25	26	17	16	24	21					22	19	18	18	18	18	21	22					23
36	(Belgium) Dewulf	Yamaha									23	28					21	18											23	20			15	10					21
37	(United Kingdom) Sterry	KTM																																	12	12	21	18	21
38	(United States) Anderson	Husqvarna																																			4	27	18
39	(United States) Millsaps	KTM																																			16	10	16
40	(Estonia) Rätsep	Honda																											13	13									16
41	(Estonia) Leok	Kawasaki							31	20	18	16													15	22			22	22									15
42	(France) Soubeyras	Honda							19	19							15	16																					15
43	(Ecuador) Benenaula	Honda																																	14	14			14
44	(Slovenia) Irt	Yamaha																	18	15											17	24							13
45	(United States) Alessi	Suzuki													22	17	13	23																					12
46	(Austria) Neurauter	KTM																			15	15					DNS	23											12
47	(Mexico) Garza	Kawasaki																																	15	15			12
48	(Italy) Bertuzzo	Yamaha							27	28							29	31	19	19	23	19					23	24			24	15							12
49	(France) Musquin	KTM																																			10	26	11
50	(France) Aubin	Suzuki															19	20	13	21																			11
51	(United Kingdom) Nicholls	KTM																					26	15	DNS	DNS	19	18											11
52	(Belgium) Delince	Honda																			20	20											17	16					11
53	(Latvia) Ivanovs	Kawasaki							25	26					18	25							19	18	19	20													11
54	(New Zealand) Townley	Honda																																			11	32	10
55	(Mexico) Andrade	Yamaha																																	16	17			9
56	(Belgium) Vanderstraeten	Husqvarna									26	22																	19	19	21	16							9
57	(Belgium) Wouts	Kawasaki																															25	14					7
58	(Ecuador) Romero	Suzuki																																	19	16			7
59	(United Kingdom) Coates	Yamaha	28	24	17	18																																	7
60	(Mexico) Garcia	Suzuki																																	17	18			7
61	(Sweden) Jonsson	Suzuki																					17	21													22	19	6
62	(Australia) Gibbs	KTM																																			32	16	5
63	(Mexico) Martinez	Suzuki																																	18	19			5
64	(Brazil) Balbi	Kawasaki																																			23	17	4
65	(Russia) Nazarov	KTM																							20	18													4
66	(France) Izoird	Honda															18	22																					3
67	(Denmark) Larsen	Husqvarna																															19	21					2
68	(Japan) Hoshino	KTM			19	21																																	2
69	(Republic of Ireland) Edmonds	Honda																			22	23											24	19					2
70	(France) Macler	Suzuki																													23	19	27	24					2
71	(Republic of Ireland) Irwin	Suzuki													19	23																							2
72	(Netherlands) Gijsbertsen	Kawasaki																															20	20					2
73	(Belgium) Boulard	Honda																													22	20	23	25					1
74	(United Kingdom) Smith	Yamaha																													20	23							1
75	(United States) Brough	Honda																																			24	20	1
	(Greece) Kouzis	Honda																			25	22	25	24			24	21	25	DNS									0
	(Republic of Ireland) Barr	KTM									21	24																											0
	(France) Fura	Kawasaki													24	21																							0
	(Guam) Lipanovich	Kawasaki																																			28	21	0
	(Sweden) Thuresson	Honda																					21	29															0
	(Thailand) Romphan	Yamaha			22	23																																	0
	(United Kingdom) Shipton	KTM	24	22																																			0
	(Belgium) Triest	KTM									22	25																											0
	(United States) Rhinehart	Suzuki																																			27	22	0
	(Sweden) Lindstrom	KTM																					22	25															0
	(Sweden) Sjoberg	Suzuki																					27	22															0
	(Sweden) Gustavsson	KTM																					23	23															0
	(Netherlands) Satink	Husqvarna									24	23																											0
	(Canada) Pauk	Honda																																			26	23	0
	(Japan) Kamakura	Yamaha			23	25																																	0
	(United Kingdom) Gregory	Yamaha													23	26																							0
	(Switzerland) Schaffter	Yamaha															24	25																					0
	(Argentina) Poli	KTM					24	26																															0
	(United States) Hicks	Honda																																			29	24	0
	(Argentina) Schmit	Yamaha					37	24																															0
	(Argentina) Villar	Honda					25	27																															0
	(Argentina) Fanello	Yamaha					28	25																															0
	(United States) Reynolds	KTM																																			31	25	0
	(New Zealand) Cooper	Honda																																			25	DNS	0
	(United Kingdom) Preston	KTM	27	26																																			0
	(France) Jacquelin	Kawasaki															26	27																					0
	(Argentina) Carranza	Honda					26	28																															0
	(France) Guidolin	Kawasaki															27	28																					0
	(Italy) Zeni	Kawasaki							30	27																													0
	(Argentina) Calveras	Honda					27	31																															0
	(Argentina) Jo. Fernández	Suzuki					30	29																															0
	(Argentina) Je. Fernandez	Suzuki					29	30																															0
	(Chile) O. Riesle	Kawasaki					31	32																															0
	(Chile) E. Reisle	Kawasaki					32	34																															0
	(Argentina) Selles	Suzuki					34	33																															0
	(Argentina) Barreyra	Kawasaki					33	37																															0
	(United States) Engle	Suzuki																													28	DNS	26	27					0
	(Italy) Bracesco	Honda																													25	23							0
	(Sweden) Lind	Suzuki																																			30	29	0
	(Argentina) Sastre	Suzuki					36	36																															0
	(Argentina) Guiral	Honda					38	DNS																															0
	(Thailand) Theplib	Honda			DNS	DNS																																	0
	(Italy) de Bortoli	Honda							DNS	DNS																													0
Pos	Rider	Bike	QAT (Qatar)		THA (Thailand)		ARG (Argentina)		TRE (Italy)		NED (Netherlands)		ESP (Spain)		GBR (United Kingdom)		FRA (France)		ITA (Italy)		GER (Germany)		SWE (Sweden)		LAT (Latvia)		CZE (Czech Republic)		BEL (Belgium)		ITA (Italy)		NED (Netherlands)		MEX (Mexico)		USA (United States)		Points

Colour	Result
Gold	Winner
Silver	Second place
Bronze	Third place
Green	Points classification
Blue	Non-points classification
Blue	Non-classified finish (NC)
Purple	Retired, not classified (Ret)
Red	Did not qualify (DNQ)
Red	Did not pre-qualify (DNPQ)
Black	Disqualified (DSQ)
White	Did not start (DNS)
White	Withdrew (WD)
White	Race cancelled (C)
Blank	Did not practice (DNP)
Blank	Did not arrive (DNA)
Blank	Excluded (EX)

==== Manufacturers' championship ====
Pos	Manufacturer	QAT (Qatar)		THA (Thailand)		ARG (Argentina)		TRE (Italy)		NED (Netherlands)		ESP (Spain)		GBR (United Kingdom)		FRA (France)		ITA (Italy)		GER (Germany)		SWE (Sweden)		LAT (Latvia)		CZE (Czech Republic)		BEL (Belgium)		ITA (Italy)		NED (Netherlands)		MEX (Mexico)		USA (United States)		Points
1	Yamaha	5	5	3	4	8	5	6	3	10	5	4	2	7	1	2	1	1	6	1	2	1	1	5	1	1	1	3	3	1	1	5	1	1	1	1	2	743
2	KTM	3	4	5	1	2	2	1	2	5	6	3	1	1	3	1	7	6	5	6	6	3	3	4	4	6	6	1	1	5	3	1	3	2	2	5	4	706
3	Suzuki	2	2	2	2	1	3	3	4	4	3	2	5	2	2	9	5	9	1	5	3	8	2	1	2	3	3	6	5	6	5	4	2	5	5	6	6	678
4	Honda	4	3	7	6	5	7	5	5	1	1	5	4	4	4	3	3	5	3	2	1	5	8	3	3	2	2	2	2	2	4	2	4	3	3	8	5	678
5	Husqvarna	1	1	4	7	3	1	2	1	2	2	1	3	3	5	4	2	4	2	7	5	4	4	10	10	10	10	8	6	7	8	6	6	6	6	4	13	630
6	Kawasaki	9	8	1	3	4	4	4	16	6	8	7	8	8	11	10	10	DSQ	13	18	18	12	12	6	8	12	8	12	7	10	9	10	20	10	7	3	1	439
7	TM	13	12	15	16	10	12	11	9	27	DNS			DNS	DNS									22	15	20	9	24	17	11	12	13	15			14	15	139
Pos	Manufacturer	QAT (Qatar)		THA (Thailand)		ARG (Argentina)		TRE (Italy)		NED (Netherlands)		ESP (Spain)		GBR (United Kingdom)		FRA (France)		ITA (Italy)		GER (Germany)		SWE (Sweden)		LAT (Latvia)		CZE (Czech Republic)		BEL (Belgium)		ITA (Italy)		NED (Netherlands)		MEX (Mexico)		USA (United States)		Points

=== MX2 ===
==== Riders' championship ====
Pos	Rider	Bike	QAT (Qatar)		THA (Thailand)		ARG (Argentina)		TRE (Italy)		NED (Netherlands)		ESP (Spain)		GBR (United Kingdom)		FRA (France)		ITA (Italy)		GER (Germany)		SWE (Sweden)		LAT (Latvia)		CZE (Czech Republic)		BEL (Belgium)		ITA (Italy)		NED (Netherlands)		MEX (Mexico)		USA (United States)		Points
1	(Slovenia) Gajser	Honda	4	7	3	DNS	12	4	2	1	17	14	11	2	DNS	DNS	4	2	3	2	1	2	2	1	7	4	33	2	5	7	3	2	1	2	5	2	6	4	589
2	(Latvia) Jonass	KTM	9	4	4	2	2	3	9	12	29	6	4	10	4	4	7	4	16	12	6	7	4	20	2	2	4	3	2	2	2	3	2	13	1	13	10	6	564
3	(United Kingdom) Anstie	Kawasaki	7	20			3	22	4	7	2	30	2	9	3	6	12	5	12	4	8	1	25	7	1	1	1	30	1	1	1	1	9	1	2	11	4	8	537
4	(Switzerland) Guillod	Yamaha	8	6	6	6	6	33	6	8	11	4	6	1	2	1	2	13	11	18	2	5	3	4	12	13	2	1	12	22	4	14	15	14	10	4	5	3	511
5	(Switzerland) Seewer	Suzuki	5	8	12	DNS	5	5	7	6	9	7	10	6	6	5	10	6	4	3	12	3	7	2	4	5	11	7	8	8	9	19	10	3	8	7	8	5	496
6	(Belgium) Lieber	Yamaha	3	2	32	3	4	34	10	11	7	15	9	5	12	12	8	17	8	9	5	4	20	6	13	10	7	8	6	3	15	11	3	6	14	3	9	DNS	430
7	(Netherlands) Herlings	KTM	1	1	1	1	35	1	1	2	1	1	1	7	1	2	1	1	6	1	29	DNS	1	24															423
8	(France) Tixier	Kawasaki	6	9	13	DNS			3	3	3	3	3	4	5	3	3	3	2	21	3	6	24	3	6	8	3	5	7	12	DNS	DNS							393
9	(France) Paturel	Yamaha	16	DSQ	7	24	8	18	12	5	16	10	15	18	9	8	20	9	15	5	7	8	12	10	11	22	5	4	10	9	6	4	7	7	3	5	13	9	376
10	(Bulgaria) Petrov	KTM	13	11	10	9	14	12	14	15	8	27	13	11																									324
10	(Bulgaria) Petrov	Kawasaki													11	9	5	8	7	11	4	DSQ					6	6	3	4	7	12	25	5	18	DNS	11	11	324
11	(Netherlands) Bogers	KTM	18	21	11	11	15	8	18	9	6	5	8	13					14	6	11	9	8	8	10	6	12	10	11	13	28	7	11	9	11	12	16	14	310
12	(United States) Covington	Kawasaki	11	10	5	5	7	7	21	16	14	12	14	14	7	10	DNS	DNS	24	22	26	DNS	13	17	14	9	24	17	19	10	27	6	6	11	4	1	12	17	285
13	(Belgium) Van Doninck	Yamaha					9	31	11	10	10	9	7	19	DNS	DNS			5	7	15	16	6	11	15	12	9	9	9	23	11	8	4	4	9	16	14	22	272
14	(Russia) Tonkov	Husqvarna	10	3	9	8	10	6	8	31	5	2	5	8	8	7	6	7	1	8	27	DNS																	256
15	(France) Ferrandis	Kawasaki	2	5	2	4	1	2	5	4	4	13	27	3																									205
16	(Italy) Monticelli	KTM	14	14	15	25	32	9	16	13	20	17	16	16	10	23	18	14	33	32	18	14	9	22	16	18	10	13	15	14	29	10	13	19	15	9	19	10	195
17	(Finland) Kullas	Suzuki									15	16			DNS	17																							181
17	(Finland) Kullas	Husqvarna																							5	3	19	16	4	5	17	DNS	5	8	6	8	7	7	181
18	(Latvia) Justs	KTM	20	15	14	10	18	15	15	17	18	11	17	20	14	11	9	15	19	14	13	12	11	9	9	16	8	15											181
19	(Russia) Brylyakov	Honda	17	12	28	15	13	14	13	30	13	18	12	15	20	13	11	11	9	34	25	18	5	5	17	17	13	19	17	17									170
20	(Belgium) Getteman	Honda	15	13	19	12	33	10	33	33	12	8	21	12	16	15	14	19							20	7	31	29	13	18	30	5							129
21	(United Kingdom) Watson	KTM	25	DNS	21	19	16	13	17	22	DNS	19	19	DNS	25	16	30	16	17	13	19	15	19	12	8	14	15	31	14	19	14	18	14	10					127
22	(Italy) Bernardini	TM											25	DNS	26	24	23	30	10	10	22	19	15	13	DSQ	15	14	11	21	15	12	30	28	12	13	10	18	15	113
23	(Germany) Jacobi	KTM							19	14					13	14	33	28	20	17	10	10			18	19	18	28	23	11	13	9	12	15					104
24	(Netherlands) Pootjes	KTM																	21	16	14	11	14	23	3	11	22	12	20	6			8	27					97
25	(Spain) Zaragoza	Honda											26	17	17	22	15	10	37	15	16	DNS	10	15	19	20	16	14											68
26	(United Kingdom) Sterry	KTM					11	11									16	34									17	18			10	13							51
27	(United States) Nelson	KTM																																			1	1	50
28	(Sweden) Lundgren	Husqvarna	19	24	17	13	17	16	29	18	23	28											22	14	21	21	23	21	18	20	16	28	17	17					50
29	(United States) McElrath	KTM																																			3	2	42
30	(Netherlands) Vlaanderen	KTM																																	7	6	20	12	39
31	(United Kingdom) Pocock	Kawasaki	12	23	8	7																																	36
32	(Belgium) Graulus	Yamaha	26	19	29	DNS											13	35	18	24											5	17							33
33	(United States) Alldredge	Kawasaki																																			2	13	30
34	(Austria) Rauchenecker	KTM															21	12			9	13																	29
35	(Belgium) Fors	Yamaha							25	21	19	22	18	21	15	26	19	33	35	20	28	17	17	16	26	26	20	33											28
36	(Estonia) Kutsar	KTM							27	25	21	21			19	18	32	DNS	22	27	23	21			25	27	26	32	16	16			16	16					25
37	(Russia) Golovkin	KTM	22	17	18	14	20	19	32	28	24	23	22	22			26	27	26	29	24	22	23	18	22	23	28	27	22	DNS	23	27	19	24					22
38	(Germany) Hsu	Suzuki																													8	32			16	DNS	24	DNS	18
39	(Argentina) Kriger	Suzuki					21	21																											12	14	23	20	17
40	(Bulgaria) Ivanov	Husqvarna							22	23	26	26	20	23	18	19	27	25	25	30	17	20	21	19	24	24	32	25			26	31	21	25					13
41	(Netherlands) Vaessen	Suzuki																																			15	16	11
42	(France) Herbreteau	Kawasaki					19	17									35	DNS					16	21															11
43	(Netherlands) De Waal	KTM																	32	36									24	21	18	16	27	18					11
44	(Italy) Recchia	Yamaha																	13	19											31	22							10
45	(Mexico) Rugerio	Yamaha																																	17	15			10
46	(Japan) Otsuka	Honda			16	16																																	10
47	(Italy) Bonini	Husqvarna							24	32									34	23							21	20			21	15	26	DNS					7
48	(Russia) Guryev	KTM	21	18	31	17	24	23	28	26	25	24			24	21	28	31																					7
49	(United States) Leith	Kawasaki																																			17	18	7
50	(France) Desprey	Kawasaki															17	18																					7
51	(United Kingdom) Featherstone	Suzuki	23	16	30	22					28	29			22	25																							5
52	(Switzerland) Valente	Husqvarna	24	22	20	18	22	24	31	27	27	25	23	25	21	20																							5
53	(Poland) Wysocki	KTM																									25	24					18	21					3
54	(France) Lacan	Honda																					18	25															3
55	(France) Jaulin	Honda							20	19																													3
56	(United States) Pauli	Kawasaki																																			21	19	2
57	(Italy) Tropepe	Honda																													19	29							2
58	(Italy) Lapucci	Husqvarna																	30	37											22	20	20	23					2
59	(United Kingdom) Booker	KTM									22	20			DNS	DNS																	23	20					2
60	(France) Mallet	Honda							23	20							24	20	23	31																			2
61	(Thailand) Penjan	Honda			22	20																																	1
62	(Italy) Furlotti	KTM																													20	23							1
63	(Argentina) Luzzardi	Honda					23	20																															1
64	(Sweden) Hjortmarker	KTM															36	24	27	26	20	24																	1
	(France) Kappel	Yamaha															DNS	26	31	33	21	23																	0
	(Thailand) Somsawat	Kawasaki			24	21																																	0
	(San Marino) Toccaceli	Honda																	36	28											33	21							0
	(France) Imbert	Kawasaki															34	21																					0
	(France) Irsuti	Yamaha							26	24			24	24	23	27	22	23	29	25																			0
	(Netherlands) Mars	KTM																															22	26					0
	(France) Barcelo	Yamaha															29	22																					0
	(Austria) Kratzer	Kawasaki																									29	22											0
	(United States) Weishaar	Yamaha																																			22	21	0
	(Netherlands) Folkers	Husqvarna																															24	22					0
	(Russia) Nazarov	KTM																							23	25													0
	(Thailand) Jomjaturong	Suzuki			27	23																																	0
	(Czech Republic) Krc	KTM																									27	23											0
	(Thailand) Suksripaisan	Honda			23	DNS																																	0
	(Switzerland) Scheiwiller	Yamaha																													24	24							0
	(Italy) Zonta	Husqvarna																													25	25							0
	(Argentina) Garrido	Yamaha					27	25																															0
	(France) Verhaeghe	Kawasaki															25	29																					0
	(Argentina) Poli	KTM					25	30																															0
	(China) Jian	Kawasaki			25	DNS																																	0
	(Chile) Vasquez	Honda					26	26																															0
	(Czech Republic) Nedved	KTM																									30	26											0
	(Italy) Cervellin	Honda																													32	26							0
	(Thailand) Koetsiri	Honda			26	DNS																																	0
	(Brazil) Munoz	Suzuki					29	27																															0
	(Chile) Danke	Kawasaki					28	28																															0
	(Argentina) Nappi	Honda					30	29																															0
	(Italy) Ciola	Suzuki							30	29																													0
	(France) Aubin	Suzuki															31	32																					0
	(Argentina) Díaz	Suzuki					31	DNS																															0
	(Czech Republic) Vondrasek	KTM																	28	35																			0
	(Argentina) Callegaris	Kawasaki					34	32																															0
	(Sweden) Jonsson	Husqvarna																																			25	DNS	0
	(Thailand) Veerakul	Honda			33	DNS																																	0
	(Argentina) J. Fanello	Suzuki					DNS	DNS																															0
	(Argentina) N. Fanello	Yamaha					DNS	DNS																															0
	(Thailand) Thangthong	KTM			DNS	DNS																																	0
Pos	Rider	Bike	QAT (Qatar)		THA (Thailand)		ARG (Argentina)		TRE (Italy)		NED (Netherlands)		ESP (Spain)		GBR (United Kingdom)		FRA (France)		ITA (Italy)		GER (Germany)		SWE (Sweden)		LAT (Latvia)		CZE (Czech Republic)		BEL (Belgium)		ITA (Italy)		NED (Netherlands)		MEX (Mexico)		USA (United States)		Points

Colour	Result
Gold	Winner
Silver	Second place
Bronze	Third place
Green	Points classification
Blue	Non-points classification
Blue	Non-classified finish (NC)
Purple	Retired, not classified (Ret)
Red	Did not qualify (DNQ)
Red	Did not pre-qualify (DNPQ)
Black	Disqualified (DSQ)
White	Did not start (DNS)
White	Withdrew (WD)
White	Race cancelled (C)
Blank	Did not practice (DNP)
Blank	Did not arrive (DNA)
Blank	Excluded (EX)

==== Manufacturers' championship ====
Pos	Manufacturer	QAT (Qatar)		THA (Thailand)		ARG (Argentina)		TRE (Italy)		NED (Netherlands)		ESP (Spain)		GBR (United Kingdom)		FRA (France)		ITA (Italy)		GER (Germany)		SWE (Sweden)		LAT (Latvia)		CZE (Czech Republic)		BEL (Belgium)		ITA (Italy)		NED (Netherlands)		MEX (Mexico)		USA (United States)		Points
1	KTM	1	1	1	1	2	1	1	2	1	1	1	7	1	2	1	1	6	1	6	7	1	8	2	2	4	3	2	2	2	3	2	9	1	6	1	1	779
2	Kawasaki	2	5	2	4	1	2	3	3	2	3	2	3	3	3	3	3	2	4	3	1	13	3	1	1	1	5	1	1	1	1	6	1	2	1	2	8	755
3	Yamaha	3	2	6	3	4	18	6	5	7	4	6	1	2	1	2	9	5	5	2	4	3	4	11	10	2	1	6	3	4	4	3	4	3	3	5	3	645
4	Honda	4	7	3	12	12	4	2	1	12	8	11	2	16	13	4	2	3	2	1	2	2	1	7	4	13	2	5	7	3	2	1	2	5	2	6	4	630
5	Suzuki	5	8	12	22	5	5	7	6	9	7	10	6	6	5	10	6	4	3	12	3	7	2	4	5	11	7	8	8	8	19	10	3	8	7	8	5	497
6	Husqvarna	10	3	9	8	10	6	8	18	5	2	5	8	8	7	6	7	1	8	17	20	21	14	5	3	19	16	4	5	16	15	5	8	6	8	7	7	444
7	TM											25	DNS	26	24	23	30	10	10	22	19	15	13	DSQ	15	14	11	21	15	12	30	28	12	13	10	18	15	113
Pos	Manufacturer	QAT (Qatar)		THA (Thailand)		ARG (Argentina)		TRE (Italy)		NED (Netherlands)		ESP (Spain)		GBR (United Kingdom)		FRA (France)		ITA (Italy)		GER (Germany)		SWE (Sweden)		LAT (Latvia)		CZE (Czech Republic)		BEL (Belgium)		ITA (Italy)		NED (Netherlands)		MEX (Mexico)		USA (United States)		Points
