= Gautier Paulin =

French motorcycle racer

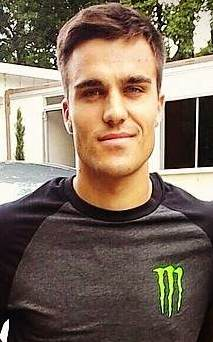
- Nationality: French
- Born: 26 March 1990 (age 36) Draguignan, France

Motocross career
- Years active: 2007-2020
- Teams: Kawasaki, Honda, Husqvarna, Yamaha
- Grands Prix: •MX2: 52 •MXGP: 148 •Combined: 200
- Wins: •MX2: 3 •MXGP: 9 •Combined: 12

Gautier Paulin (born 26 March 1990) is a French former professional motocross racer. He competed in the Motocross World Championships from 2007 until 2020. Paulin was a member of the French team that won five consecutive Motocross des Nations events between 2014 and 2018.

== Biography ==
Born in Draguignan, France, Paulin began racing BMX bikes at the age of six and, won a BMX world championship at the age of ten. He won the 2007 European motocross championship in the EMX2 class. He then competed in the MX2 class of the Motocross World Championship with his best result being a third-place finish in the 2009 MX2 championship while riding for the Kawasaki Bud Racing PSM Racing team. Paulin was then contracted to ride in the premier MXGP class for the Honda factory racing team. He finished the 2015 FIM Motocross World Championship as runner up to Romain Febvre. He raced for Rockstar Energy Husqvarna Factory Racing in the 2017 and 2018 season. On 25 September 2018, Yamaha Motor Europe announced that Paulin was signed to the Wilvo Yamaha Official MXGP Team to race in the 2019 season.

He is the only French motocross racer to earn Gold Medals in the past five straight Motocross Des Nations Championships. Paulin was crowned Motocross Des Nations Team World Champion in 2014, 2015, 2016, 2017 and 2018. In 2023, he won said championship as Team Manager of the French Team.
