= Ķegums =

Town in Ogre Municipality, Latvia

- Town
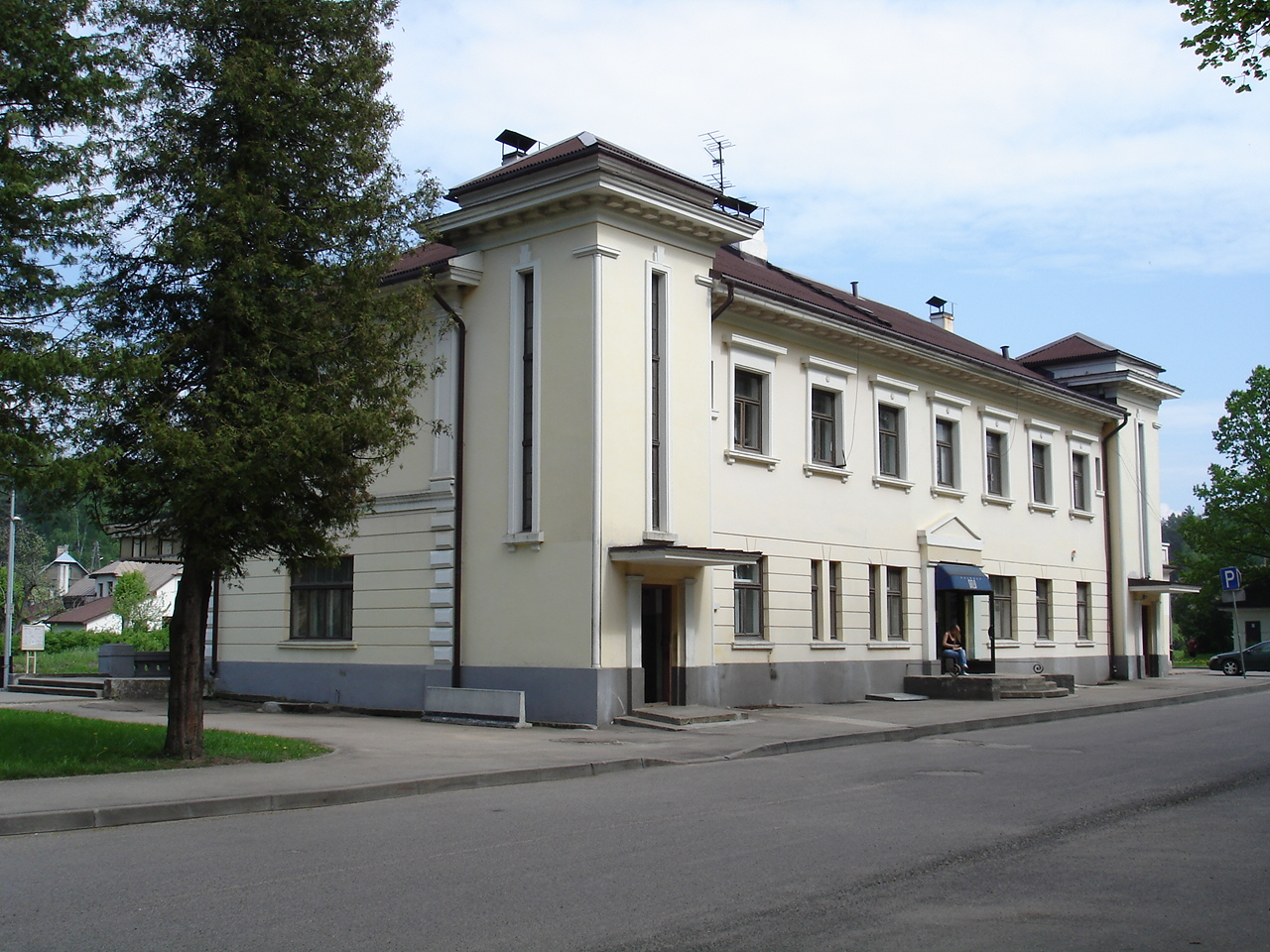
- Ķegums railway station

- Coat of arms

- Location in Latvia
- Coordinates: 56°44′N 24°42′E
- Country: Latvia
- Municipality: Ogre Municipality
- Town rights: 1993

Government
  - Mayor: Roberts Ozols

Area
  - Total: 6.88 km^{2} (2.66 sq mi)
  - Land: 4.07 km^{2} (1.57 sq mi)
  - Water: 2.81 km^{2} (1.08 sq mi)
  - Rural territory: 101 km^{2} (39 sq mi)

Population (2026)
  - Total: 2,047
  - Density: 503/km^{2} (1,300/sq mi)
- Time zone: UTC+2 (EET)
  - Summer (DST): UTC+3 (EEST)
- Postal code: LV-5020
- Calling code: +371 650
- Number of city council members: 8
- Website: http://www.kegums.lv/

Ķegums (German: Keggum) is a town in Ogre Municipality situated mostly on the right bank of the Daugava River. Latvian law defines Ķegums town as divided between two regions, Vidzeme on the right bank of the Daugava and Semigallia on the left bank.

== History ==
The construction of the town was started in 1936 as a settlement to house the workers constructing the Ķegums Hydroelectric Power Station. In 1949 Ķegums became an Urban type settlement. Ķegums was granted town status in 1993.

== Sport ==
Ķegums has been host to the Latvian Grand Prix of Motocross World Championship and Sidecarcross World Championship numerous times. Ķegums hosted Latvian Grand Prix of Motocross World Championship during the 2009, 2010, 2011, 2012, 2013 and 2015.

== See also ==
- List of cities in Latvia
- Latvian fleet that fought for the Allies in World War II – one of the ships held the name of the town
