= Villars-sous-Écot =

- Commune
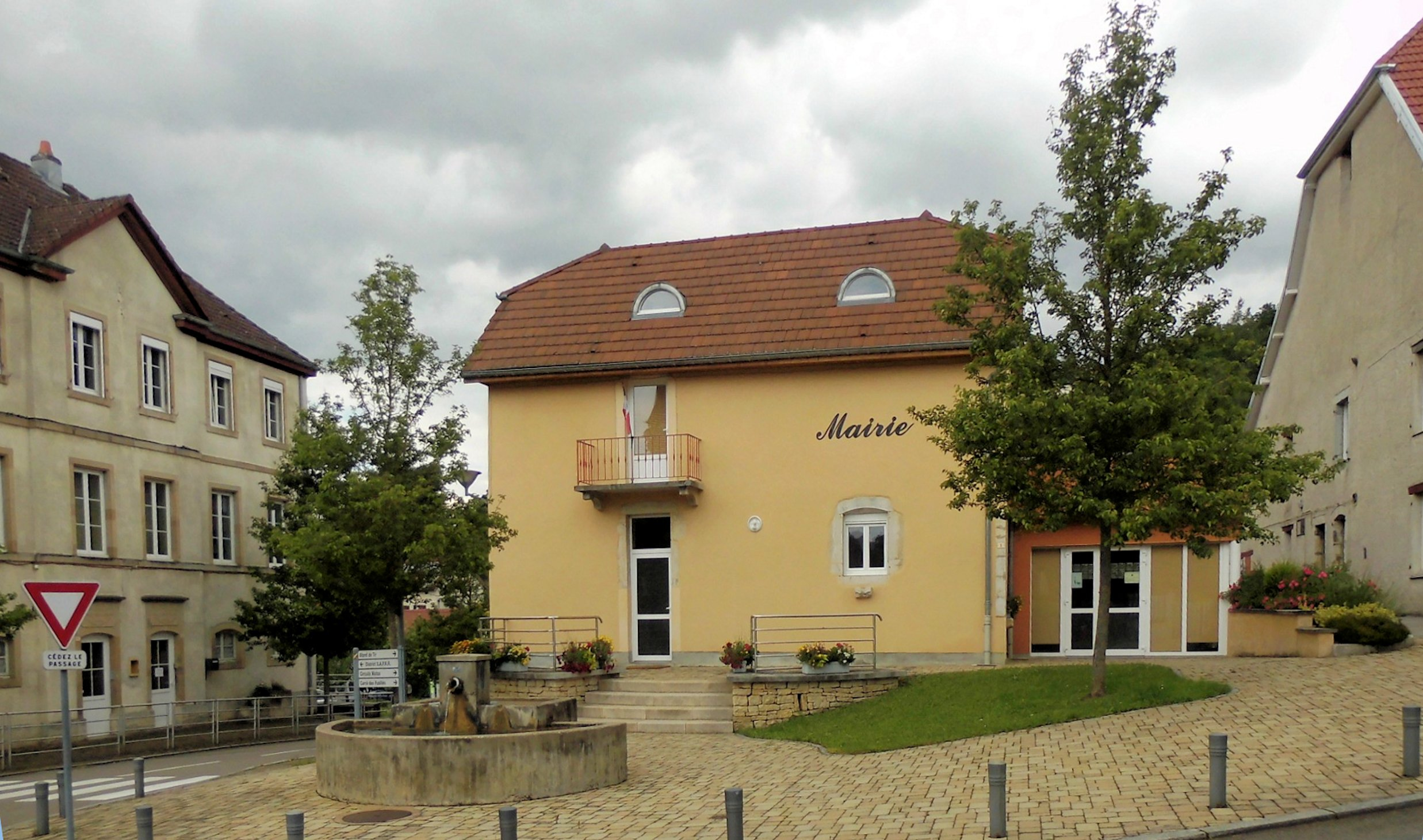
- The town hall in Villars-sous-Écot

- Coat of arms
- Location of Villars-sous-Écot
- Location within France Location within Bourgogne-Franche-Comté
- Coordinates: 47°25′21″N 6°42′00″E
- Country: France
- Region: Bourgogne-Franche-Comté
- Department: Doubs
- Arrondissement: Montbéliard
- Canton: Bavans
- Intercommunality: Pays de Montbéliard Agglomération

Government
  - Mayor (2020–2026): Christian Hirsch
- Area^{1}: 11.48 km^{2} (4.43 sq mi)
- Highest elevation: 531 m (1,742 ft)
- Lowest elevation: 333 m (1,093 ft)
- Population (2023): 332
  - Density: 28.9/km^{2} (74.9/sq mi)
- Time zone: UTC+01:00 (CET)
  - Summer (DST): UTC+02:00 (CEST)
- INSEE/Postal code: 25618 /25150
- ^{1} French Land Register data, which excludes lakes, ponds, glaciers > 1 km^{2} (0.386 sq mi or 247 acres) and river estuaries.

Villars-sous-Écot (French pronunciation: [vilaʁ su.z‿eko], literally Villars under Écot) is a commune in the Doubs department in the Bourgogne-Franche-Comté region in eastern France.

== Population ==
Historical population
Year	Pop.	±% p.a.
1968	178	—
1975	205	+2.04%
1982	348	+7.85%
1990	362	+0.49%
1999	360	−0.06%
2007	384	+0.81%
2012	368	−0.85%
2017	352	−0.89%
2023	332	−0.97%
Source: INSEE

== See also ==
- Écot
- Communes of the Doubs department
