= Écot =

- Commune
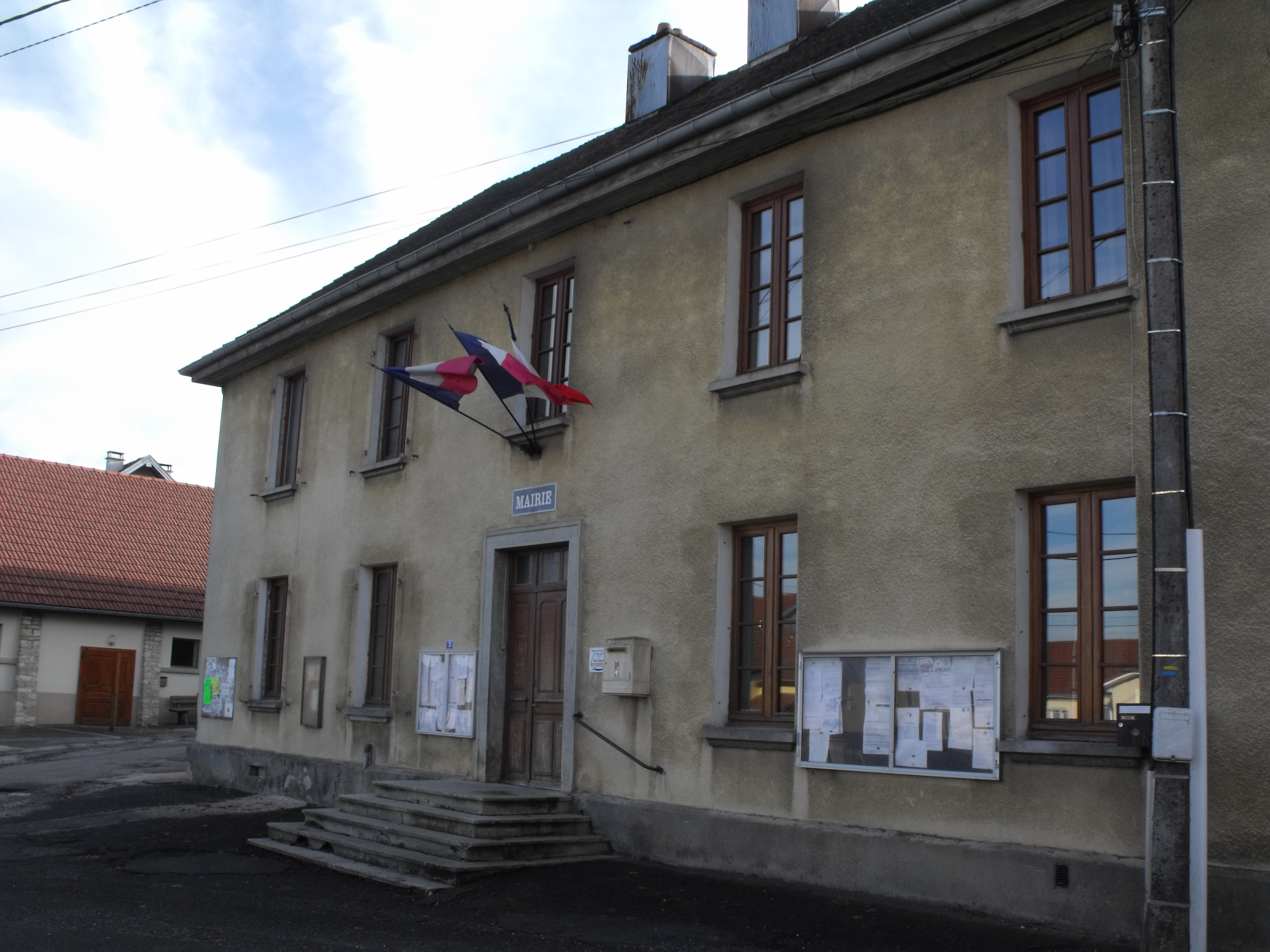
- The town hall in Écot

- Coat of arms
- Location of Écot
- Location within France Location within Bourgogne-Franche-Comté
- Coordinates: 47°25′37″N 6°44′00″E
- Country: France
- Region: Bourgogne-Franche-Comté
- Department: Doubs
- Arrondissement: Montbéliard
- Canton: Valentigney
- Intercommunality: Pays de Montbéliard Agglomération

Government
  - Mayor (2020–2026): Alain Sylvant
- Area^{1}: 11.02 km^{2} (4.25 sq mi)
- Elevation: 517 m (1,696 ft)
- Highest elevation: 574 m (1,883 ft)
- Lowest elevation: 376 m (1,234 ft)
- Population (2023): 510
  - Density: 46/km^{2} (120/sq mi)
- Time zone: UTC+01:00 (CET)
  - Summer (DST): UTC+02:00 (CEST)
- INSEE/Postal code: 25214 /25150
- ^{1} French Land Register data, which excludes lakes, ponds, glaciers > 1 km^{2} (0.386 sq mi or 247 acres) and river estuaries.

Écot (French pronunciation: [eko]) is a commune in the Doubs department in the Bourgogne-Franche-Comté region in eastern France.

== Population ==
Historical population
Year	Pop.	±% p.a.
1968	226	—
1975	254	+1.68%
1982	363	+5.23%
1990	365	+0.07%
1999	388	+0.68%
2007	434	+1.41%
2012	502	+2.95%
2017	503	+0.04%
2023	510	+0.23%
Source: INSEE

== See also ==
- Communes of the Doubs department
