= Eduardo Andrade Sánchez =

Mexican politician

- Born: 29 July 1948 (age 78); Coatzacoalcos, Veracruz, Mexico
- Education: National Autonomous University of Mexico
- Occupation: Politician
- Political party: PRI

Justino Eduardo Andrade Sánchez (Note: In this Mexican name, the surname is Andrade and the second or maternal family name is Sánchez.) (born 29 July 1948) is a Mexican politician from the Institutional Revolutionary Party (PRI).

A native of Coatzacoalcos, Veracruz, he served as a federal deputy in the 50th Congress (representing Mexico City's first district) and 58th Congress (as a plurinominal deputy for the third region) and as a senator in the 56th and 57th Congresses, representing Veracruz.
