= Pauls Jonass =

Latvian motorcycle racer

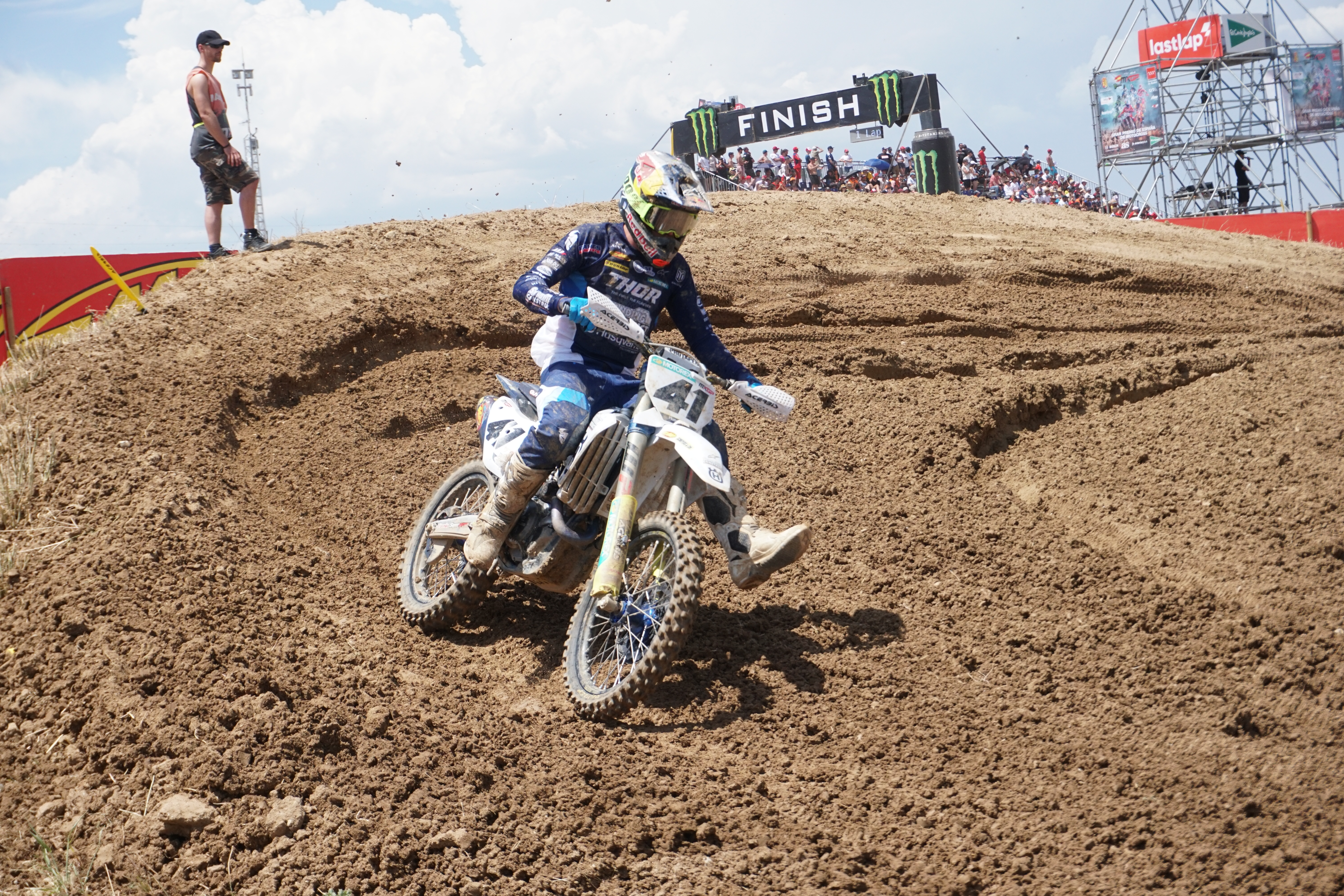
- Jonass in 2022
- Nationality: (Latvia) Latvian
- Born: 13 January 1997 (age 29) Kalvene, Kalvene Parish, Latvia

Motocross career
- Years active: 2014-Present
- Teams: •Standing Construct Honda (2022-2024); •Kawasaki MXGP Racing Team (2024-Present)
- Championships: 2011 FIM 85cc; 2013 FIM 125cc; 2013 EMX 125cc; 2017 MX2
- Wins: •MX2: 11; •MXGP: 1

Pauls Jonass (born 13 January 1997, in Kalvene, Kalvene Parish, South Kurzeme Municipality) is a Latvian professional motocross racer. He has competed in the Motocross World Championships since 2014 and is the 2017 MX2 World Champion.

== MXGP Results ==
Year	Rnd 1	Rnd 2	Rnd 3	Rnd 4	Rnd 5	Rnd 6	Rnd 7	Rnd 8	Rnd 9	Rnd 10	Rnd 11	Rnd 12	Rnd 13	Rnd 14	Rnd 15	Rnd 16	Rnd 17	Rnd 18	Rnd 19	Rnd 20	Average Finish	Podium Percent	Place
2015 MX2	6	2	2	11	14	7	4	4	13	7	11	2	2	2	3	6	4	9	-	-	6.06	33%	2nd
2017 MX2	1	21	1	4	2	1	2	3	1	1	2	2	1	2	3	3	7	2	5	-	3.36	79%	1st
2018 MX2	1	1	1	5	5	1	3	2	1	5	3	5	2	4	5	2	2	2	6	OUT	2.94	63%	2nd
2024 MXGP	4	7	4	9	1	9	5	13	OUT	OUT	OUT	OUT	OUT	OUT	OUT	OUT	OUT	OUT	OUT	OUT	6.50	13%	14th
2025 MXGP	7	11	5	OUT	OUT	OUT	5	9	14	DNF	OUT	OUT	OUT	OUT	OUT	10	9	8	9	10	8.82	-	15th
2026 MXGP	10 ARG (Argentina)	16 AND (Andalusia)	16 SUI (Switzerland)	14 SAR (Sardinia)	10 TRE	11 FRA (France)	11 GER (Germany)	5 LAT (Latvia)	10 ITA (Italy)	6 POR (Portugal)	9 RSA (South Africa)	21 GBR (United Kingdom)	OUT CZE (Czech Republic)	OUT FLA (Flanders)	4 SWE (Sweden)	9 NED (Netherlands)	5 TUR (Turkey)	5 CHN (China)	9 AUS (Australia)	-	10.05	-	9th
