= 2014 FIM Motocross World Championship =

Motocross championship season

The 2014 FIM Motocross World Championship was the 58th F.I.M. Motocross World Championship season. It included 17 events including Qatar, Thailand, Brazil, Italy, The Netherlands, Great Britain, France, Germany, Sweden, Finland, Czech Republic, Belgium and Mexico.

In the premier MXGP class, Tony Cairoli won his sixth consecutive championship title, matching the previous record set by Stefan Everts between 2001 and 2006. Cairoli, riding a KTM, won a total of 9 rounds and 15 races en route to the title, finishing 119 points clear of his nearest rival, Jeremy Van Horebeek, riding a Yamaha. In his second season at MXGP level, Van Horebeek achieved his maiden race victory at Loket in the Czech Republic, and also took his first round win in the process. Third place in the final championship standings went to Suzuki's Kevin Strijbos, who won the other race at Loket. Fourth place went to another Suzuki rider, Clément Desalle, who won four rounds and seven races, but due to an injury suffered at Uddevalla, he missed four of the last five rounds. Other riders to take round victories were Gautier Paulin – book-ending the season with victories in the season-opening and season-closing rounds – and Maximilian Nagl, while both riders each won five races.

In MX2, the season was dominated by the Red Bull KTM Factory Racing team, and in particular, two-time defending champion Jeffrey Herlings. Herlings won 12 of the first 13 rounds to be held during the season, and 22 of the 26 races including a streak of 18 consecutive victories; after Hyvinkää, Herlings was 145 points clear of team-mate Jordi Tixier, with only 200 points available at the final 4 rounds. However, while competing in a charity event between events, Herlings crashed and suffered a broken femur. He was unable to compete in the next three rounds, where Tixier took a round win and two victories; he never finished lower than fourth in the six-race run. Herlings' advantage was reduced to 23 points, but he elected to compete in the final round in Mexico. However, he could do no better than tenth in either race, with Tixier taking a win and a third place – winning the round in the process – to take his first world title, by just four points. The top three placings were completed by Romain Febvre, who achieved a race and round win in Goiânia. Max Anstie and Arnaud Tonus were the only other riders to take round wins – each winning one race – while race victories were also taken by Glenn Coldenhoff (two wins), Tim Gajser (two wins), Dylan Ferrandis and Christophe Charlier.

== Race calendar and results ==
Originally scheduled for 17 August as the sixteenth round of the championship, the Ukrainian GP was postponed in April due to pro-Russian unrest in the country.

Round	Date	Grand Prix	Location	Race 1 Winner	Race 2 Winner	Round Winner
MXGP
1	1 March	Qatar	Losail	(Germany) Maximilian Nagl	(France) Gautier Paulin	(France) Gautier Paulin
2	9 March	Thailand	Si Racha	(Italy) Tony Cairoli	(Italy) Tony Cairoli	(Italy) Tony Cairoli
3	30 March	Brazil	Beto Carrero	(Italy) Tony Cairoli	(Italy) Tony Cairoli	(Italy) Tony Cairoli
4	13 April	Italy	Arco di Trento	(France) Gautier Paulin	(Belgium) Clément Desalle	(Belgium) Clément Desalle
5	20 April	Bulgaria	Sevlievo	(France) Gautier Paulin	(Italy) Tony Cairoli	(Italy) Tony Cairoli
6	4 May	Netherlands	Valkenswaard	(France) Gautier Paulin	(Italy) Tony Cairoli	(Italy) Tony Cairoli
7	11 May	Spain	Talavera	(Belgium) Clément Desalle	(Belgium) Clément Desalle	(Belgium) Clément Desalle
8	25 May	United Kingdom	Winchester	(Italy) Tony Cairoli	(Belgium) Clément Desalle	(Italy) Tony Cairoli
9	1 June	France	Saint-Jean-d'Angély	(Belgium) Clément Desalle	(Belgium) Clément Desalle	(Belgium) Clément Desalle
10	15 June	Italy	Maggiora	(Italy) Tony Cairoli	(Italy) Tony Cairoli	(Italy) Tony Cairoli
11	22 June	Germany	Teutschenthal	(Germany) Maximilian Nagl	(Belgium) Clément Desalle	(Belgium) Clément Desalle
12	6 July	Sweden	Uddevalla	(Italy) Tony Cairoli	(Italy) Tony Cairoli	(Italy) Tony Cairoli
13	13 July	Finland	Hyvinkää	(Italy) Tony Cairoli	(Italy) Tony Cairoli	(Italy) Tony Cairoli
14	27 July	Czech Republic	Loket	(Belgium) Kevin Strijbos	(Belgium) Jeremy Van Horebeek	(Belgium) Jeremy Van Horebeek
15	3 August	Belgium	Lommel	(Italy) Tony Cairoli	(Italy) Tony Cairoli	(Italy) Tony Cairoli
16	7 September	Brazil	Trindade	(Germany) Maximilian Nagl	(Germany) Maximilian Nagl	(Germany) Maximilian Nagl
17	14 September	Mexico	León	(Germany) Maximilian Nagl	(France) Gautier Paulin	(France) Gautier Paulin
MX2
1	1 March	Qatar	Losail	(France) Dylan Ferrandis	(Netherlands) Jeffrey Herlings	(Netherlands) Jeffrey Herlings
2	9 March	Thailand	Si Racha	(Netherlands) Jeffrey Herlings	(Netherlands) Jeffrey Herlings	(Netherlands) Jeffrey Herlings
3	30 March	Brazil	Beto Carrero	(Switzerland) Arnaud Tonus	(Netherlands) Glenn Coldenhoff	(Switzerland) Arnaud Tonus
4	13 April	Italy	Arco di Trento	(Netherlands) Jeffrey Herlings	(Netherlands) Glenn Coldenhoff	(Netherlands) Jeffrey Herlings
5	20 April	Bulgaria	Sevlievo	(Netherlands) Jeffrey Herlings	(Netherlands) Jeffrey Herlings	(Netherlands) Jeffrey Herlings
6	4 May	Netherlands	Valkenswaard	(Netherlands) Jeffrey Herlings	(Netherlands) Jeffrey Herlings	(Netherlands) Jeffrey Herlings
7	11 May	Spain	Talavera	(Netherlands) Jeffrey Herlings	(Netherlands) Jeffrey Herlings	(Netherlands) Jeffrey Herlings
8	25 May	United Kingdom	Winchester	(Netherlands) Jeffrey Herlings	(Netherlands) Jeffrey Herlings	(Netherlands) Jeffrey Herlings
9	1 June	France	Saint-Jean-d'Angély	(Netherlands) Jeffrey Herlings	(Netherlands) Jeffrey Herlings	(Netherlands) Jeffrey Herlings
10	15 June	Italy	Maggiora	(Netherlands) Jeffrey Herlings	(Netherlands) Jeffrey Herlings	(Netherlands) Jeffrey Herlings
11	22 June	Germany	Teutschenthal	(Netherlands) Jeffrey Herlings	(Netherlands) Jeffrey Herlings	(Netherlands) Jeffrey Herlings
12	6 July	Sweden	Uddevalla	(Netherlands) Jeffrey Herlings	(Netherlands) Jeffrey Herlings	(Netherlands) Jeffrey Herlings
13	13 July	Finland	Hyvinkää	(Netherlands) Jeffrey Herlings	(Netherlands) Jeffrey Herlings	(Netherlands) Jeffrey Herlings
14	27 July	Czech Republic	Loket	(France) Jordi Tixier	(France) Christophe Charlier	(France) Jordi Tixier
15	3 August	Belgium	Lommel	(United Kingdom) Max Anstie	(France) Jordi Tixier	(United Kingdom) Max Anstie
16	7 September	Brazil	Trindade	(France) Romain Febvre	(Slovenia) Tim Gajser	(France) Romain Febvre
17	14 September	Mexico	León	(France) Jordi Tixier	(Slovenia) Tim Gajser	(France) Jordi Tixier

== Participants ==
=== MXGP ===
Team	Constructor	No	Rider	Rounds
TM Ricci Racing	TM	3	(Estonia) Tanel Leok	1–10, 12–14
TM Ricci Racing	TM	39	(Italy) Davide Guarneri	1–14
Team CLS Kawasaki Monster Energy MXGP	Kawasaki	8	(Italy) Alessandro Lupino	4
Team CLS Kawasaki Monster Energy MXGP	Kawasaki	61	(Netherlands) Herjan Brakke	3
Team CLS Kawasaki Monster Energy MXGP	Kawasaki	100	(United Kingdom) Tommy Searle	1–2, 6, 8–14
Red Bull KTM Factory Racing	KTM	9	(Belgium) Ken De Dycker	6–14
Red Bull KTM Factory Racing	KTM	222	(Italy) Tony Cairoli	1–14
KTM Sarholz	KTM	11	(France) Sébastien Pourcel	9
KTM Sarholz	KTM	149	(Germany) Dennis Ullrich	4–12, 14
Team HRC	Honda	12	(Germany) Maximilian Nagl	1–5, 11–14
Team HRC	Honda	777	(Russia) Evgeny Borbryshev	1–7, 9–10
	KTM	13	(Italy) Simone Zecchina	4
BT Honda	Honda	14	(Netherlands) Marc de Reuver	6
	KTM	16	(Finland) Joni Roos	13
DP19 Racing Yamaha	Yamaha	19	(Italy) David Philippaerts	1–14
Monster Energy Kawasaki Racing Team	Kawasaki	21	(France) Gautier Paulin	1–6, 14
Monster Energy Kawasaki Racing Team	Kawasaki	183	(France) Steven Frossard	1–14
Monster Energy Kawasaki Racing Team	Kawasaki	737	(France) Valentin Teillet	10–11
Rockstar Energy Suzuki World MXGP	Suzuki	22	(Belgium) Kevin Strijbos	1–14
Rockstar Energy Suzuki World MXGP	Suzuki	25	(Belgium) Clément Desalle	1–12, 14
HMPlant KTM UK	KTM	24	(United Kingdom) Shaun Simpson	1–14
RedBull IceOne Husqvarna Factory Racing	Husqvarna	28	(South Africa) Tyla Rattray	1, 4–10
RedBull IceOne Husqvarna Factory Racing	Husqvarna	47	(Australia) Todd Waters	1–5
RedBull IceOne Husqvarna Factory Racing	Husqvarna	111	(Australia) Dean Ferris	12–14
RedBull IceOne Husqvarna Factory Racing	Husqvarna	281	(Austria) Pascal Rauchenecker	2–3
RedBull IceOne Husqvarna Factory Racing	Husqvarna	991	(United Kingdom) Nathan Watson	11–14
Phoenix Tools Honda	Honda	31	(United Kingdom) Alex Snow	8
2b Yamaha	Yamaha	32	(France) Milko Potisek	4, 6–7, 9–14
J-Race Racing Team	Honda	34	(Belgium) Joel Roelants	1–10
	Honda	41	(Sweden) Nicklas Gustavsson	12
	Suzuki	43	(Thailand) Wattana Kanlaya	2
Wilvo Forkrent KTM	KTM	45	(United Kingdom) Jake Nicholls	1–11
Wilvo Forkrent KTM	KTM	91	(Latvia) Matiss Karro	1–14
	Honda	46	(Thailand) Arnon Theplib	2
	Honda	48	(Thailand) Jugkrit Suksripaisan	2
24MX Honda Racing	Honda	51	(Belgium) Jens Getteman	1–2, 6–7
24MX Honda Racing	Honda	62	(Slovenia) Klemen Gerčar	12–14
24MX Honda Racing	Honda	121	(France) Xavier Boog	1–9
24MX Honda Racing	Honda	126	(Belgium) Jeremy Delince	8–9
24MX Honda Racing	Honda	251	(Sweden) Filip Thuresson	4, 10–12
Team Gebben Kawasaki	Kawasaki	61	(Netherlands) Herjan Brakke	4–9, 12–14
Honda Jtech	Honda	62	(Slovenia) Klemen Gerčar	1–11
Oakleaf Kawasaki	Kawasaki	68	(United Kingdom) Shane Carless	8
Oakleaf Kawasaki	Kawasaki	221	(Estonia) Priit Rätsep	8
	Yamaha	69	(Iran) Amir Reza Sabetifar	1
	Yamaha	73	(Thailand) Chaiyan Romphan	2
Yamaha Factory Racing	Yamaha	89	(Belgium) Jeremy van Horebeek	1–14
Latvia – Husqvarna Racing	Husqvarna	95	(Latvia) Augusts Justs	1–6
HTS KTM	KTM	108	(Hungary) Kornél Németh	10
	Yamaha	115	(Spain) Carlos Campano	3
GST-Berlin KTM	KTM	116	(Ukraine) Mykola Paschinskiy	11
GST-Berlin KTM	KTM	711	(Germany) Christian Brockel	11
GST-Berlin KTM	KTM	717	(Russia) Timur Muratov	11
KMP Honda	Honda	120	(France) Cedric Soubeyras	9
Motostar Racing	Suzuki	147	(Sweden) Jesper Jonsson	12
	Yamaha	173	(Italy) Pier Fillipo Bertuzzo	10, 14
	Yamaha	203	(Brazil) Anderson Cidade	3
Cofain KTM	KTM	211	(Czech Republic) Petr Smitka	11, 14
Cofain KTM	KTM	281	(Austria) Pascal Rauchenecker	6, 11, 14
Cofain KTM	KTM	519	(Germany) Dennis Baudrexl	11
	Kawasaki	214	(Italy) Samuel Zeni	4, 10
Sturm Racing Kawasaki	Kawasaki	220	(France) Gregory Aranda	10–11
Sturm Racing Kawasaki	Kawasaki	436	(Italy) Matteo Bonini	10
	KTM	232	(Czech Republic) Martin Michek	14
Waldmann Suzuki	Suzuki	287	(Germany) Marcus Schiffer	11
	Honda	311	(Sweden) Rasmus Sjoberg	12
	Honda	323	(Italy) Alessandro Albertoni	4
	Honda	338	(Greece) Panagiotis Kouzis	12
	Husqvarna	388	(Finland) Ludvig Soderberg	13
	Kawasaki	410	(Estonia) Indrek Magi	13
	Kawasaki	411	(South Africa) Ross Runnalls	1
Bike It Yamaha Cosworth	Yamaha	419	(United Kingdom) Ryan Houghton	8, 13
Bike It Yamaha Cosworth	Yamaha	999	(Portugal) Rui Gonçalves	1–14
	Yamaha	511	(Italy) Stefano Dami	10
Heads and all Threads	Suzuki	555	(Republic of Ireland) Graeme Irwin	8, 14
	Kawasaki	600	(Latvia) Davis Ivanovs	12–13
KTM Scandinavia	KTM	664	(Sweden) Filip Bengtsson	6, 12–13
24MX Husqvarna	Husqvarna	671	(Finland) Santtu Tiainen	4
	Honda	702	(Switzerland) Julien Bill	3
	Yamaha	716	(Brazil) Rafael da Silva Faria	3
	KTM	722	(Sweden) Tom Johnsson	12–13
Rockstar Bud Racing Kawasaki	Kawasaki	737	(France) Valentin Teillet	7, 9
SR Suzuki	Suzuki	871	(France) Fabien Izoird	9
	Kawasaki	903	(Brazil) Antonio Balbi	3
	KTM	914	(Uruguay) Richard Berois	3
	Yamaha	925	(Spain) Raul Alvarez	7
	Yamaha	927	(Brazil) Thales Vilardi	3
	Honda	941	(Italy) Angelo Pellegrini	10
Dantec Husqvarna	Husqvarna	991	(United Kingdom) Nathan Watson	8
	Honda	992	(Brazil) Jean Ramos	3

=== MX2 ===
Team	Constructor	No	Rider	Rounds
SDM Racing	Kawasaki	5	(Italy) Nicola Recchia	4
Team CLS Kawasaki Monster Energy MX2	Kawasaki	8	(Italy) Alessandro Lupino	1–3
Team CLS Kawasaki Monster Energy MX2	Kawasaki	122	(France) Dylan Ferrandis	1–14
Team CLS Kawasaki Monster Energy MX2	Kawasaki	200	(Switzerland) Arnaud Tonus	1–10
Bodo Schmidt KTM	KTM	10	(Netherlands) Calvin Vlaanderen	11, 14
KTM Silver Action	KTM	17	(Spain) José Butrón	1–14
KTM Silver Action	KTM	300	(Russia) Viacheslav Golovkin	1–14
KTM Silver Action	KTM	922	(Belgium) Kevin Fors	
Yamaha Factory Racing	Yamaha	23	(France) Christophe Charlier	1–2, 7–8, 11–14
Kemea Yamaha Racing Team	Yamaha	26	(Australia) Luke Styke	1–8, 11–13
Kemea Yamaha Racing Team	Yamaha	152	(Bulgaria) Petar Petrov	1–13
Sarholz KTM	KTM	29	(Germany) Henry Jacobi	11
CEC I.S. Racing	KTM	30	(Sweden) Eddie Hjortmarker	4–6, 9–14
Rockstar Energy Suzuki Europe	Suzuki	33	(Belgium) Julien Lieber	1–14
Rockstar Energy Suzuki Europe	Suzuki	91	(Switzerland) Jeremy Seewer	1–14
Rockstar Energy Suzuki Europe	Suzuki	259	(Netherlands) Glenn Coldenhoff	1–5
Yamaha Motors Deutschland	Yamaha	37	(Germany) Stephan Buttner	11
	Kawasaki	50	(Thailand) Thanarat Penjan	2
Wilvo Nestaan Husqvarna Factory Racing	Husqvarna	59	(Russia) Alexandr Tonkov	1–14
Wilvo Nestaan Husqvarna Factory Racing	Husqvarna	461	(France) Romain Febvre	1–14
Monster Energy Kawasaki Racing	Kawasaki	64	(United States) Thomas Covington	1–14
Bike It Yamaha Cosworth	Yamaha	67	(Norway) Magne Klingsheim	1–14
Bike It Yamaha Cosworth	Yamaha	99	(United Kingdom) Max Anstie	1–14
Bike It Yamaha Cosworth	Yamaha	274	(Sweden) Anton Lundgren	1–3, 14
TM Ricci Racing	TM	71	(Switzerland) Christopher Valente	1–2, 4, 12–14
	Yamaha	74	(Italy) Francesco Muratori	10
	Husqvarna	79	(Italy) Filippo Lucaroni	10
Red Bull KTM Factory Racing	KTM	84	(Netherlands) Jeffrey Herlings	1–2, 4–13
Red Bull KTM Factory Racing	KTM	911	(France) Jordi Tixier	1–14
HSF Logistics	KTM	88	(Netherlands) Frederik van der Vlist	6, 9
HSF Logistics	KTM	189	(Netherlands) Brian Bogers	4, 6, 9, 11
Standing Construct KTM	KTM	92	(Switzerland) Valentin Guillod	1–14
Standing Construct KTM	KTM	171	(Belgium) Damon Graulus	4, 6–13
Nestaan Jumbo Team	Honda	107	(Netherlands) Lars van Berkel	9–14
VHR	Kawasaki	110	(France) Alexis Verhaeghe	9
	KTM	112	(Norway) Even Heibye	12
One One Four Kawasaki	Kawasaki	114	(France) Livia Lancelot	2–3
HMPlant KTM UK	KTM	119	(United Kingdom) Mel Pocock	1–14
HMPlant KTM UK	KTM	919	(United Kingdom) Ben Watson	6
	KTM	125	(Netherlands) Michael Hool	6
Marchetti Racing Team KTM	KTM	128	(Italy) Ivo Monticelli	4–10, 12–14
Marchetti Racing Team KTM	KTM	741	(Latvia) Pauls Jonass	4, 10–14
Sahkar Racing	KTM	132	(Estonia) Karel Kutsar	8
Sahkar Racing	KTM	151	(Finland) Harri Kullas	4–7, 10–14
	Honda	134	(Brazil) Caio Lopes	3
Honda Jtech	Honda	141	(France) Maxime Desprey	1–14
Ties Pol Motors	Suzuki	144	(Netherlands) Rick Folkers	6
	Honda	155	(Japan) Gota Otsuka	2, 12
CreyMert Racing	KTM	172	(Belgium) Brent Van Doninck	4
Latvia – Husqvarna Racing	Husqvarna	195	(Latvia) Roberts Justs	1–9, 11–14
Latvia – Husqvarna Racing	Husqvarna	495	(Belgium) Mathias Plessers	4–6, 9–14
Bud Racing Kawasaki	Kawasaki	199	(Spain) Jorge Zaragoza	9
GJV Racing	Yamaha	210	(Russia) Vsevolod Brylyakov	6, 9–14
	Honda	230	(Brazil) Hector Assuncao	3
Honda Gariboldi	Honda	243	(Slovenia) Tim Gajser	1–14
Honda Gariboldi	Honda	400	(Japan) Kei Yamamoto	1–9, 12–14
	Kawasaki	329	(Netherlands) Luca Nijenhuis	6
Tip Top Racing Team	Yamaha	331	(France) Arnaud Aubin	9
	TM	332	(Brazil) Rodrigo Andrade	3
	Yamaha	333	(Italy) Luca Borz	4
	Kawasaki	340	(Italy) Alessandro Brugnoni	4, 10
STC Racing	Honda	346	(Denmark) Thomas Kjer Olesen	11
Sturm Racing	Suzuki	443	(Germany) Niklas Raths	11
	Kawasaki	483	(Brazil) Anderson Amaral	3
MB Honda	Honda	556	(France) Simon Mallet	4, 9–10
	Suzuki	601	(Italy) Francesco Ciola	4
	KTM	613	(Czech Republic) Václav Kovář	14
Dantec Husqvarna	Husqvarna	685	(France) Steven Lenoir	8
	Honda	712	(Brazil) Endrews Armstrong	3
	Honda	743	(Italy) Alessandro D'Angelo	10
Kosak KTM	KTM	811	(Romania) George Cabal	5
	Suzuki	878	(Italy) Stefano Pezzuto	10
	Honda	987	(Brazil) Fábio Santos	3

== Championship standings ==
=== MXGP ===
Pos	Rider	Team	Bike	QAT (Qatar)		THA (Thailand)		BRA (Brazil)		TRE (Italy)		BUL (Bulgaria)		NED (Netherlands)		ESP (Spain)		GBR (United Kingdom)		FRA (France)		ITA (Italy)		GER (Germany)		SWE (Sweden)		FIN (Finland)		CZE (Czech Republic)		BEL (Belgium)		GOI (Brazil)		MEX (Mexico)		Points
1	(Italy) Cairoli	Red Bull KTM Factory Racing	KTM	2	3	1	1	1	1	6	4	2	1	3	1	6	2	1	2	2	3	1	1	5	4	1	1	1	1	3	2	1	1	5	3	3	2	747
2	(Belgium) van Horebeek	Yamaha Factory Racing	Yamaha	5	5	3	3	2	4	3	2	4	2	2	3	2	4	3	3	3	2	2	2	4	3	3	2	2	10	2	1	7	9	13		5	5	628
3	(Belgium) Strijbos	Rockstar Energy Suzuki	Suzuki	7	8	5	14	13	6	4	3	3	5	6	2	4	3	5	7	4	13	4	3	7	2	2	4	5	4	1	3	5	8	3	9	2	3	572
4	(Belgium) Desalle	Rockstar Energy Suzuki	Suzuki	9	6	2	2	3	3	2	1	5	3	4	4	1	1	4	1	1	1	7	4	2	1	4	Ret			7	DNS							484
5	(France) Frossard	Monster Energy Kawasaki	Kawasaki	4	2	12	Ret	14	9	Ret	DNS	9	Ret	10	6	3	5	2	Ret	6	4	3	Ret	3	Ret	5	9	3	2	11	5	13	6	2	7	7	8	419
6	(Germany) Nagl	Team HRC	Honda	1	4	6	4	4	5	4	5	10	10											1	7	9	3	4	7	4	17	6	20	1	1	1	4	400
7	(United Kingdom) Simpson	HM Plant KTM UK	KTM	11	Ret	7	11	15	13	12	6	12	7	16	8	10	13	9	6	8	10	8	6	6	5	7	10	12	3	5	8	3	3	19	6	6	Ret	397
8	(France) Paulin	Monster Energy Kawasaki	Kawasaki	3	1	4	9	6	2	1	Ret	1	4	1	Ret															6	6	2	4	4	2	4	1	358
9	(Italy) Guarneri	TM Ricci Racing	TM	12	Ret	8	8	16	16	9	11	15	19	12	Ret	12	14	14	12	10	9	10	8	12	10	12	6	18	13	21	7	17	12	12	5	8	7	297
10	(Italy) Philippaerts	DP19 Racing Yamaha	Yamaha	13	12	Ret	Ret	9	14	11	18	11	12	14	14	11	7	11	11	15	Ret	9	5	11	6	10	7	9	9					8	10	13	12	275
11	(Portugal) Goncalves	Bike it Yamaha Cosworth	Yamaha	17	17	15	7	10	7	18	13	13	9	21	13	15	8	Ret	13	12	7	Ret	11	14	13	21	11	13	6	19	12	15	11	9	16	11	9	266
12	(United Kingdom) Searle	CLS Monster Energy Kawasaki	Kawasaki	6	7	Ret												6	5	17	6	6	9	8	8	6	5	6	17	18	9			7	4	9	6	256
13	(Latvia) Karro	Wilvo Forkrent KTM	KTM	Ret	15	Ret	13	20	8	13	14	14	17	18	10	14	Ret	16	8	11	8	15	Ret	17	16	19	8	10	11	12	10	11	Ret	11	11	10	10	239
14	(Russia) Bobryshev	Team HRC	Honda	8	9	11	5	5	22	7	Ret	7	Ret	5	18	5	15			5	5	5																184
15	(France) Boog	24MX Honda	Honda	Ret	13	9	10	12	12	10	10	6	11	Ret	9	7	9	12	19	7	Ret																	159
16	(Belgium) Roelants	J-Race Racing Team	Honda	10	10	14	12	8	11	8	19	Ret	14	8	5	9	11	13	10	16																		158
17	(South Africa) Rattray	Red Bull IceOne Husqvarna	Husqvarna							16	21	8	6	7	7	8	10	8	4			12	Ret									8	10					149
18	(Estonia) Leok	TM Ricci Racing	TM	15	14	13	18	19	17	Ret	15	18	13	11	11	Ret	16	10	Ret	18	14	14	13			17	Ret	16	15	10	11	Ret	19					146
19	(France) Potisek	2b Yamaha	Yamaha							21	12			19	Ret	17	12			14	Ret	Ret	14	10	12	11	Ret	14	Ret	8	14	Ret	14	10	8	12	11	145
20	(Belgium) De Dycker	Red Bull KTM Factory Racing	KTM											23	Ret	19	Ret	Ret	15	22	17	Ret	7	13	11	8	12	15	8	15	Ret	4	2					131
21	(Germany) Ullrich	Sarholz KTM	KTM							19	Ret	19	18	22	17	16	17	15	14	9	12	11	12	18	9	16	14			16	4	18	Ret					126
22	(United Kingdom) Nicholls	Wilvo Forkrent KTM	KTM	16	16	Ret	15	11	15	15	9	17	15	17	16	13	6	7	9	20	Ret	Ret		26	15													125
23	(Australia) Waters	Red Bull IceOne Husqvarna	Husqvarna	14	11	10	6	7	10	14	7	16	8																									107
24	(Australia) Ferris	Red Bull IceOne Husqvarna	Husqvarna																							13	Ret	7	5	9	15	9	7	6	17			101
25	(United Kingdom) Watson	Red Bull IceOne Husqvarna	Husqvarna															17	18					16	24	14	13	11	12	13	13							62
26	(Sweden) Bengtsson	KTM Scandinavia	KTM											15	12											18	15	8	14			16	13					57
27	(France) Teillet	Monster Energy Kawasaki	Kawasaki													18	Ret			13	11	16	17	9	17													46
28	(Netherlands) de Reuver	BT Honda	Honda											9	20																	10	5					40
29	(Slovenia) Gercar	Honda Jtech/24MX Honda	Honda	19	19	18	19	23	Ret	24	20	Ret	16	25	21	21	18	22	20	23	18	20	18	20	Ret	25	18	20	21	25	20	20	17					37
30	(France) Aranda	Sturm Racing Kawasaki	Kawasaki																			13	10	15	14													32
31	(Netherlands) Brakke	Team Gebben Kawasaki	Kawasaki					22	18	22	16	20	20	Ret	Ret	20	19	Ret	21	21	Ret					26	16	17	16	20	18							31
32	(Austria) Rauchenecker	Red Bull IceOne Husqvarna/Cofain KTM	Husqvarna/ KTM			16	16	17	Ret					13	15									22	20					24	21							29
33	(Italy) Lupino	CLS Monster Energy Kawasaki	Kawasaki							17	8																											17
34	(Republic of Ireland) Irwin	Heads and all Threads	Suzuki															19	16											17	16							16
35	(Estonia) Krestinov	Apico LPE Kawasaki	Kawasaki																													12	15					15
36	(Mexico) M.García		KTM																																	14	13	15
37	(Brazil) W.Garcia		Honda																															15	13			14
38	(Venezuela) Martin		Yamaha																															17	12			13
39	(Mexico) Andrade		Yamaha																																	15	14	13
40	(United Kingdom) Chatfield	Vulcano Honda	Honda																															14	15			13
41	(Estonia) Rätsep	Oakleaf Kawasaki	Kawasaki															23	23													14	16					12
42	(Belgium) Delince	24MX Honda	Honda															18	17	Ret	16																	12
43	(Sweden) Thuresson	24MX Honda	Honda							20	17											22	20	Ret	DNS	20	17											11
44	(Belgium) Getteman	24MX Honda	Honda	18	18	19	DNS							20	19																							11
45	(Brazil) Ramos		Honda					21	21																									18	14			10
46	(Mexico) D.Garcia		Kawasaki																																	16	16	10
47	(Latvia) Justs	Latvia Husqvarna	Husqvarna	Ret	DNS	17	17	Ret	19	23	Ret	Ret	Ret	24	DNS																							10
48	(Czech Republic) Michek		KTM																											14	19							9
49	(France) Soubeyras	KMP Honda	Honda																	19	15																	8
50	(Hungary) Nemeth	HTS KTM	KTM																			18	16									Ret	Ret					8
51	(Ecuador) Salazar		Honda																															16	18			8
52	(Mexico) Heredia		Honda																																	18	17	7
53	(Mexico) López		Yamaha																																	17	18	7
54	(Mexico) Martínez		Kawasaki																																	Ret	15	6
55	(Italy) Bonini	Sturm Racing Kawasaki	Kawasaki																			21	15															6
56	(Denmark) Larsen		Honda																							15	Ret											6
57	(Poland) Lonka		Honda																													19	18					5
58	(Germany) Schiffer	Waldmann Suzuki	Suzuki																					19	18													5
59	(Italy) Bertuzzo		Yamaha																			17	23							23	Ret							4
60	(Brazil) Balbi		Kawasaki					20	18																													4
61	(Mexico) Macias		Yamaha																																	19	19	4
62	(Latvia) Ivanovs		Kawasaki																							24	Ret	Ret	18									3
63	(Italy) Zeni		Kawasaki							Ret	23											19	21															2
64	(Russia) Muratov	GST-Berlin KTM	KTM																					21	19													2
65	(Sweden) Jonsson	Motostar Racing	Suzuki																							23	19											2
66	(Finland) Soderberg		Husqvarna																									Ret	19									2
67	(Italy) Pellegrini		Honda																			Ret	19															2
68	(France) Izoird	SR Suzuki	Suzuki																	Ret	19																	2
69	(Finland) Roos		KTM																									19	Ret									2
70	(Mexico) Juanz		Honda																																	20	20	2
71	(Thailand) Theplib		Honda			20	20																															2
72	(Iran) Sabetifar		Yamaha	20	20																																	2
73	(United Kingdom) Houghton	Bike it Yamaha Cosworth	Yamaha															21	22									Ret	20									1
74	(Spain) Alvarez		Yamaha													22	20																					1
75	(France) Pourcel	Sarholz KTM	KTM																	Ret	20																	1
76	(Sweden) Gustavsson		Honda																							27	20											1
77	(United Kingdom) Carless	Oakleaf Kawasaki	Kawasaki															20	DNS																			1
	(Thailand) Romphan		Yamaha			22	21																															0
	(Germany) Brockel	GST-Berlin KTM	KTM																					24	21													0
	(Greece) Kouzis		Honda																							24	21											0
	(Thailand) Suksripaisan		Honda			21	Ret																															0
	(Estonia) Magi		Kawasaki																									21	DNS									0
	(Czech Republic) Smitka	Cofain KTM	KTM																					23	22					22	22							0
	(Italy) Dami		Yamaha																			23	22															0
	(Finland) Tiainen		Husqvarna							26	22																											0
	(Thailand) Kanlaya		Suzuki			Ret	22																															0
	(Sweden) Johnsson		KTM																							22	Ret	Ret	Ret									0
	(Ukraine) Paschinskiy	GST-Berlin KTM	KTM																					25	23													0
	(Brazil) Cidade		Yamaha					Ret	23																													0
	(Brazil) Vilardi		Yamaha					24	24																													0
	(Italy) Zecchina		KTM							25	24																											0
	(United Kingdom) Snow	Phoenix Tools Honda	Honda															Ret	24																			0
	(Brazil) da Silva		Yamaha					25	Ret																													0
	(Italy) Albertoni		Honda							Ret	25																											0
	(Uruguay) Berois		KTM					26	25																													0
	(South Africa) Runnals		Kawasaki	Ret	Ret																																	0
	(Sweden) Sjoberg		Honda																							Ret	Ret											0
	(Switzerland) Bill		Honda					Ret	Ret																													0
	(Mexico) Bucio		Suzuki																																	Ret	Ret	0
	(Spain) Campano		Yamaha					Ret	DNS																													0
	(Germany) Baudrexl	Cofain KTM	KTM																					Ret	DNS													0

=== MX2 ===
Pos	Rider	Team	Bike	QAT (Qatar)		THA (Thailand)		BRA (Brazil)		TRE (Italy)		BUL (Bulgaria)		NED (Netherlands)		ESP (Spain)		GBR (United Kingdom)		FRA (France)		ITA (Italy)		GER (Germany)		SWE (Sweden)		FIN (Finland)		CZE (Czech Republic)		BEL (Belgium)		GOI (Brazil)		MEX (Mexico)		Points
1	(France) Tixier	Red Bull KTM	KTM	7	7	5	6	12	12	6	6	3	3	2	4	4	9	2	5	4	3	3	3	4	3	4	2	2	4	1	4	3	1	5	4	1	3	616
2	(Netherlands) Herlings	Red Bull KTM	KTM	2	1	1	1			1	2	1	1	1	1	1	1	1	1	1	1	1	1	1	1	1	1	1	1							14	10	612
3	(France) Febvre	Wilvo Nestaan Husqvarna Factory Racing	Husqvarna	5	4	9	3	3	11	7	5	5	5	3	3	5	4	8	4	5	4	6	6	5	6	3	11	5	9	2	6	4	4	1	3	2	7	570
4	(France) Ferrandis	Team CLS Kawasaki Monster Energy MX2	Kawasaki	1	6	4	5	2	10	10	Ret	4	4	8	4	3	3	7	12	6	6	7	2	3	12	12	3	12	2	21	2	2	3	2	2	3	19	533
5	(Slovenia) Gajser	Honda Gariboldi	Honda	8	10	12	Ret	11	3	3	11	6	8	9	9	17	2	4	3	11	5	4	5	2	2	2	6	3	3	4	9	8	6	7	1	5	1	528
6	(Switzerland) Tonus	Team CLS Kawasaki Monster Energy MX2	Kawasaki	10	2	3	9	1	2	2	3	2	2	12	2	2	5	5	2	2	2	2	4											3	8	4	6	455
7	(Switzerland) Guillod	Standing Construct KTM	KTM	9	14	11	Ret	7	5	4	4	18	12	4	7	Ret	7	6	16	3	9	17	7	6	4	5	5	9	7	3	3	9	8	4	6	6	2	449
8	(Russia) Tonkov	Wilvo Nestaan Husqvarna Factory Racing	Husqvarna	6	5	7	8	6	7	14	8	10	9	5	8	10	Ret	9	6	8	15	5	13	Ret	5	11	4	6	12	8	7	7	7	9	12	8	Ret	397
9	(Spain) Butrón	KTM Silver Action	KTM	4	8	13	10	9	9	9	7	17	20	10	6	8	6	10	7	17	10	16	12	8	9	8	7	13	5	5	5	Ret	5	Ret	13	10	18	359
10	(Switzerland) Seewer	Rockstar Energy Suzuki Europe	Suzuki	14	18	19	12	10	6	5	9	9	10	11	20	16	13	13	9	9	7	10	8	12	11	10	9	8	11	6	11	10	13	10	5	9	9	352
11	(Belgium) Lieber	Rockstar Energy Suzuki Europe	Suzuki	18	13	14	Ret	13	15	Ret	DNS	11	18	7	10	6	11	16	13	13	23	13	9	7	7	6	15	7	8	9	10			6	11	7	4	292
12	(United Kingdom) Anstie	Bike it Yamaha Cosworth	Yamaha	Ret	17	6	2	4	4	Ret	Ret	13	15	6	Ret	20	14	3	Ret	7	13	8	Ret	Ret	8	9	Ret	Ret	DNS	14	8	1	2	11	9	Ret	20	283
13	(Netherlands) Coldenhoff	Rockstar Energy Suzuki Europe	Suzuki	3	12	2	4	5	1	8	1	7	7																			6	10	11	10	12	5	248
14	(Bulgaria) Petrov	Kemea Yamaha Racing Team	Yamaha	16	11	18	Ret	8	Ret	Ret	10	8	6	15	14	9	10	18	14	10	8	9	11	9	15	13	13	15	6			11	9					239
15	(France) Charlier	Yamaha Factory Racing	Yamaha	12	9	10	Ret									12	8	20	DNS					10	10	7	8	4	10	7	1	17	Ret	8	7	17	8	220
16	(United Kingdom) Pocock	HMPlant KTM UK	KTM	13	19	15	14	15	13	23	12	Ret	Ret	Ret	DNS	14	19	14	21	15	12	14	Ret	11	13	16	24	16	17	15	13	14	15					143
17	(United States) Covington	Monster Energy Kawasaki	Kawasaki	Ret	3	16	13	17	Ret	27	19	16	14	Ret	11	23	15	17	11	12	11	Ret	DNS			20	20	Ret	Ret	Ret	DNS	16	18	15	14	15	12	138
18	(Finland) Kullas	Sahkar Racing	KTM							15	14	14	13	14	16	15	17					12	15	15	20	17	14	11	14	17	17	12	11					127
19	(France) Desprey	Honda Jtech	Honda	15	15	Ret	11	Ret	Ret	11	13	19	26	20	23	19	16	22	18	24	16	11	14	23	24	18	21	20	19	11	14	Ret	21					98
20	(Belgium) Graulus	Standing Construct KTM	KTM							18	16			19	12	7	22	11	8	14	Ret	18	10	Ret	16	15	17	19	Ret									94
21	(Italy) Monticelli	Marchetti Racing Team KTM	KTM							Ret	20	12	11	16	13	13	12	12	10	Ret	Ret	Ret	DNS			19	22	17	15	16	16	19	Ret					94
22	(Australia) Styke	Kemea Yamaha Racing Team	Yamaha	Ret	DNS	26	Ret	14	14	13	15	15	16	17	18	11	21	15	15					13	19	24	19	Ret	DNS									80
23	(Latvia) Justs	Latvia Husqvarna Racing	Husqvarna	17	22	21	15	16	16	16	Ret	Ret	17	18	19	18	Ret	21	17	Ret	14			Ret	18	21	Ret	18	Ret	Ret	12	13	14					78
24	(Latvia) Jonass	Marchetti Racing Team KTM	KTM							12	Ret											Ret	16	Ret	22	Ret	12	14	13	10	18	5	12					77
25	(Russia) Brylyakov	GJV Yamaha	Yamaha											26	21					16	19	15	Ret	14	14	14	10	10	Ret	12	15	Ret	19					73
26	(Japan) Yamamoto	Honda Gariboldi	Honda	22	20	20	Ret	18	19	22	23	23	21	25	Ret	22	20	23	19	18	17					23	18	Ret	DNS	18	20	26	24	14	15	11	11	57
27	(Italy) Lupino	Team CLS Kawasaki Monster Energy MX2	Kawasaki	11	16	8	7	Ret	8																													55
28	(Norway) Klingsheim	Bike it Yamaha Cosworth	Yamaha	19	21	17	16	20	18	21	21	22	22	27	26	21	18	24	20	Ret	24	22	25	16	31	Ret	16	Ret	DNS	26	Ret	22	20					30
29	(Sweden) Lundgren	Bike it Yamaha Cosworth	Yamaha	20	24	22	17																							22	22			17	17	13	13	29
30	(Netherlands) Bogers	HSF Logistics	KTM							19	17			13	17					21	18			19	21													23
31	(Sweden) Hjortmarker	CEC I.S. Racing	KTM							20	22	20	19	24	22					20	Ret	19	18	18	23	22	Ret	22	18	19	21	20	17					23
32	(Netherlands) Vlaanderen	Bodo Schmidt KTM	KTM																					17	17					13	19							18
33	(Brazil) Assuncao		Honda					Ret	17																									13	16			17
34	(Netherlands) van Berkel	Nestaan Jumbo Team	Honda																	23	21	20	20	22	25	Ret	23	21	16	20	23	18	16					16
35	(France) Mallet	MB Honda	Honda							17	18									19	20	Ret	17															14
36	(Mexico) Garza		Suzuki																																	16	14	14
37	(Mexico) Tovar		KTM																																	18	15	9
38	(Brazil) Santos		Honda					22	21																									16	18			8
39	(Netherlands) van der Vlist	HSF Logistics	KTM											21	15					Ret	DNS																	6
40	(Netherlands) Hool		KTM											22	Ret																	15	Ret					6
41	(Mexico) Blanco		Honda																																	20	16	6
42	(Mexico) Moreira		KTM																																	Ret	17	4
43	(Brazil) Lopes		Honda					25	23																									18	20			4
44	(Brazil) Munoz		Yamaha																															19	19			4
45	(Switzerland) Valente	TM Ricci Racing	TM	21	23	23	18			26	25															26	26	23	21	23	25							3
46	(Brazil) dos Santos		TM					19	20																													3
47	(France) Lenoir	Dantec Husqvarna	Husqvarna															19	22																			2
48	(Thailand) Penjan		Kawasaki			27	19																															2
49	(Italy) D'angelo		Honda																			Ret	19															2
50	(Mexico) Rugerio		Yamaha																																	19	Ret	2
51	(Brazil) Bottcher		Honda																															20	21			1
52	(Russia) Golovkin	KTM Silver Action	KTM	23	25	25	Ret	23	22	30	28	25	25	28	27	24	Ret			25	26	23	23	26	28	28	25	24	20	24	Ret	24	23					1
53	(Germany) Jacobi	Sarholz KTM	KTM																					20	27													1
54	(France) Lancelot	One One Four Kawasaki	Kawasaki			28	20	Ret	DNS																													1
	(Italy) Pezzuto		Suzuki																			21	21															0
	(Romania) Cabal	Kosak KTM	KTM									21	23																									0
	(Denmark) Kjer Olsen	STC Racing	Honda																					21	26													0
	(Belgium) Bakens		Yamaha																													21	Ret					0
	(Brazil) Amaral		Kawasaki					21	DNS																													0
	(France) Aubin	Tip Top Racing Team	Yamaha																	22	22																	0
	(Belgium) Plessers	Latvia Husqvarna	Husqvarna							29	27	24	24	Ret	DNS					Ret	Ret	25	24	25	29	25	Ret	25	DNS	25	DNS	25	22					0
	(Italy) Muratori		Yamaha																			Ret	22															0
	(United Kingdom) Watson	HM Plant KTM UK	KTM											23	24																							0
	(Netherlands) Folkers	Ties Pol	Suzuki											Ret	DNS																	23	Ret					0
	(Germany) Buttner	Yamaha Motors Deutschland	Yamaha																					24	32													0
	(Italy) Brugnoni		Kawasaki							25	Ret											24	Ret															0
	(Italy) Borz		Yamaha							24	26																											0
	(Belgium) Van Doninck	CreyMert Racing	KTM							28	24																											0
	(Brazil) Armstrong		Honda					24	Ret																													0
	(Czech Republic) Kovar		KTM																											Ret	24							0
	(Japan) Otsuka		Honda			24	Ret																			27	27											0
	(Netherlands) Nijenhuis		Kawasaki											Ret	25																							0
	(France) Verhaeghe	VHR	Kawasaki																	Ret	25																	0
	(Italy) Lucaroni		Husqvarna																			26	26															0
	(Germany) Raths		Suzuki																					27	30													0
	(Spain) Zaragoza	Bud Racing Kawasaki	Kawasaki																	Ret	Ret																	0
	(Norway) Heibye		KTM																							Ret	Ret											0
	(Uruguay) Carbajal		Honda																															Ret	Ret			0
	(Italy) Recchia	SDM Racing	Kawasaki							Ret	DNS																											0
	(Italy) Ciola		Suzuki							Ret	DNS																											0
	(Estonia) Kutsar	Sakhar Racing	KTM															Ret	DNS																			0
