= 2011 FIM Motocross World Championship =

Motocross championship season

2011 Motocross World Championship

Seasons
- ← 2010 2012 →

The 2011 FIM Motocross World Championship was the 55th F.I.M. Motocross World Championship season. It included 30 races at 15 events including Bulgaria, The Netherlands, the United States, Brazil, France, Portugal, Spain, Sweden, Germany, Latvia, Limburg, Czech Republic, the United Kingdom, Europe and Italy.

== 2011 Calendar ==
The 2011 calendars of the FIM Motocross World Championships promoted by Youthstream were finalised on 25 October 2010. In MX3 two final rounds of the season, originally scheduled in Geneva (Switzerland) and in Spain on 4 and 11 September were cancelled on 20 July 2011.

Round	Date	Grand Prix	Location	Race 1 Winner	Race 2 Winner	Round Winner
MX1
1	April 10	Bulgaria	Sevlievo	(France) Steven Frossard	(Belgium) Clément Desalle	(Belgium) Clément Desalle
2	April 25	Netherlands	Valkenswaard	(Italy) Antonio Cairoli	(Germany) Maximilian Nagl	(Italy) Antonio Cairoli
3	May 15	United States	Glen Helen	(Belgium) Clément Desalle	(Belgium) Clément Desalle	(Belgium) Clément Desalle
4	May 22	Brazil	Indaiatuba	(Italy) Antonio Cairoli	(Italy) David Philippaerts	(Italy) David Philippaerts
5	June 5	France	Saint-Jean-d'Angély	(France) Steven Frossard	(Belgium) Clément Desalle	(France) Steven Frossard
6	June 12	Portugal	Águeda	(Belgium) Clément Desalle	(Belgium) Clément Desalle	(Belgium) Clément Desalle
7	June 19	Spain	La Bañeza	(France) Steven Frossard	(Italy) Antonio Cairoli	(Italy) Antonio Cairoli
8	July 3	Sweden	Uddevalla	(France) Steven Frossard	(France) Steven Frossard	(France) Steven Frossard
9	July 10	Germany	Teutschenthal	(Russia) Evgeny Bobryshev	(Russia) Evgeny Bobryshev	(Russia) Evgeny Bobryshev
10	July 17	Latvia	Ķegums	(Italy) Antonio Cairoli	(Italy) Antonio Cairoli	(Italy) Antonio Cairoli
11	July 31	(Belgium) Limburg	Lommel	(Italy) Antonio Cairoli	(Italy) Antonio Cairoli	(Italy) Antonio Cairoli
12	August 7	Czech Republic	Loket	(Italy) Antonio Cairoli	(Belgium) Clément Desalle	(Belgium) Clément Desalle
13	August 21	United Kingdom	Winchester	(France) Christophe Pourcel	(Italy) Antonio Cairoli	(Italy) Antonio Cairoli
14	September 4	Europe	Gaildorf	(Russia) Evgeny Bobryshev	(France) Christophe Pourcel	(Italy) Antonio Cairoli
15	September 11	Italy	Fermo	(France) Gautier Paulin	(France) Christophe Pourcel	(France) Gautier Paulin
MX2
1	April 10	Bulgaria	Sevlievo	(Germany) Ken Roczen	(Germany) Ken Roczen	(Germany) Ken Roczen
2	April 25	Netherlands	Valkenswaard	(Netherlands) Jeffrey Herlings	(Netherlands) Jeffrey Herlings	(Netherlands) Jeffrey Herlings
3	May 15	United States	Glen Helen	(Germany) Ken Roczen	(Germany) Ken Roczen	(Germany) Ken Roczen
4	May 22	Brazil	Indaiatuba	(Germany) Ken Roczen	(Netherlands) Jeffrey Herlings	(Netherlands) Jeffrey Herlings
5	June 5	France	Saint-Jean-d'Angély	(Germany) Ken Roczen	(United Kingdom) Tommy Searle	(United Kingdom) Tommy Searle
6	June 12	Portugal	Águeda	(Germany) Ken Roczen	(United Kingdom) Tommy Searle	(Netherlands) Jeffrey Herlings
7	June 19	Spain	La Bañeza	(Germany) Ken Roczen	(Germany) Ken Roczen	(Germany) Ken Roczen
8	July 3	Sweden	Uddevalla	(Germany) Ken Roczen	(Germany) Ken Roczen	(Germany) Ken Roczen
9	July 10	Germany	Teutschenthal	(Germany) Ken Roczen	(France) Gautier Paulin	(Germany) Ken Roczen
10	July 17	Latvia	Ķegums	(Germany) Ken Roczen	(Germany) Ken Roczen	(Germany) Ken Roczen
11	July 31	(Belgium) Limburg	Lommel	(Netherlands) Jeffrey Herlings	(Netherlands) Jeffrey Herlings	(Netherlands) Jeffrey Herlings
12	August 7	Czech Republic	Loket	(Germany) Ken Roczen	(Germany) Ken Roczen	(Germany) Ken Roczen
13	August 21	United Kingdom	Winchester	(Germany) Ken Roczen	(Germany) Ken Roczen	(Germany) Ken Roczen
14	September 4	Europe	Gaildorf	(Germany) Ken Roczen	(United Kingdom) Tommy Searle	(United Kingdom) Tommy Searle
15	September 11	Italy	Fermo	(United Kingdom) Tommy Searle	(Netherlands) Jeffrey Herlings	(Netherlands) Jeffrey Herlings
MX3
1	April 17	Greece	Megalopolis	(Switzerland) Julien Bill	Race cancelled	(Switzerland) Julien Bill
2	April 24	Bulgaria	Troyan	(France) Milko Potisek	(France) Milko Potisek	(France) Milko Potisek
3	June 12	Finland	Vantaa	(Switzerland) Julien Bill	(Switzerland) Julien Bill	(Switzerland) Julien Bill
4	June 19	Umbria	Castiglione del Lago	(Switzerland) Julien Bill	(Switzerland) Julien Bill	(Switzerland) Julien Bill
5	June 26	Slovakia	Šenkvice	(France) Milko Potisek	(Switzerland) Julien Bill	(Switzerland) Julien Bill
6	July 10	Ukraine	Chernivtsy	(France) Milko Potisek	(Switzerland) Julien Bill	(Switzerland) Julien Bill
7	June 17	Slovenia	Orehova vas	(Switzerland) Julien Bill	(Switzerland) Julien Bill	(Switzerland) Julien Bill
8	August 7	France	Lacapelle-Marival	(Switzerland) Julien Bill	(Switzerland) Julien Bill	(Switzerland) Julien Bill

== Championship standings ==
=== MX1 ===
==== Riders' Championship ====
Points are awarded to the top 20 classified finishers.

Position	1st	2nd	3rd	4th	5th	6th	7th	8th	9th	10th	11th	12th	13th	14th	15th	16th	17th	18th	19th	20th
Points	25	22	20	18	16	15	14	13	12	11	10	9	8	7	6	5	4	3	2	1

(key)

Pos	Rider	Bike	BUL (Bulgaria)		NED (Netherlands)		USA (United States)		BRA (Brazil)		FRA (France)		POR (Portugal)		ESP (Spain)		SWE (Sweden)		GER (Germany)		LAT (Latvia)		LIM (Belgium)		CZE (Czech Republic)		GBR (United Kingdom)		EUR (Europe)		ITA (Italy)		Pts
1	(Italy) Cairoli	KTM	7	10	1	2	2	11	1	2	2	3	2	2	2	1	5	2	2	2	1	1	1	1	1	4	3	1	3	2	WD	WD	596
2	(France) Frossard	Yamaha	1	2	2	5	10	23	3	5	1	2	3	7	1	9	1	1	3	15	2	2	4	6	5	12	2	2	29	DNS			472
3	(Belgium) Desalle	Suzuki	2	1	5	6	1	1	4	4	11	1	1	1	5	3	8	7	5	3	8	8	2	4	2	1							461
4	(Russia) Bobryshev	Honda	12	4	10	7	6	3	8	11	6	5	4	4	8	7	2	4	1	1	3	3	6	3	4	26			1	8	7	16	444
5	(Germany) Nagl	KTM	3	6	3	1	3	2	5	6	7	9	8	30	4	6	7	10	4	7	4	10	5	2	7	6	5	5	4	10	27	DNS	439
6	(Portugal) Gonçalves	Honda	8	5	6	4	12	4	10	13	14	4	7	3	7	10	9	8	7	4	7	4	3	13	3	3	6	14	6	4	9	6	431
7	(France) Boog	Kawasaki	11	8	17	14	14	10	9	8	4	7	5	9	10	8	3	11	13	17	9	25	10	12	8	7	11	DNS	2	6	2	5	347
8	(Spain) Barragán	Kawasaki	6	3	14	10	9	8	17	9	15	6	13	8	9	5	33	9	8	6	28	11	9	14	11	10	14	4	12	29	4	3	326
9	(Italy) Philippaerts	Yamaha	4	14	4	3	5	9	2	1	3	18	28	27	3	4	15	3	9	8	5	5	7	9									308
10	(Belgium) Strijbos	Suzuki	9	7	16	18	4	5	11	7	9	11	11	11	17	16	12	12	35	32	17	27	16	15	6	8	13	8	5	5	3	4	295
11	(Belgium) De Dycker	Honda	22	17	7	8	29	20	6	10	5	8	6	6	11	11	4	6	6	5	6	9	12	8	15	9							268
12	(Estonia) T. Leok	TM	27	9	9	9	15	15	19	12	10	10	10	10	13	2	14	30	15	27	12	7	8	5	12	2	4	DNS	9	28	13	28	267
13	(France) Boissière	Yamaha	15	13	15	13	7	12	12	29	16	13	31	13	14	13	11	15	36	14	13	13	13	18	26	13	10	9	10	3	5	7	238
14	(Belgium) Ramon	Suzuki	10	12	8	12	28	7	7	3	12	17	15	5	6	12	6	5	10	9	10	6	DNS	DNS									229
15	(United Kingdom) Simpson	Honda	13	16	20	17	16	6	13	18	13	12	12	12	16	23	27	16	11	12	15	15	11	7	10	11	16	10	11	7	29	9	222
16	(Italy) Guarneri	Kawasaki	5	11	12	11	13	16	DNS	DNS	19	16	9	28	12	26	28	13	12	26	11	12	34	25	9	16	8	11	7	32	6	8	204
17	(France) C. Pourcel	Kawasaki																	34	31					13	5	1	3	34	1	8	1	132
18	(France) Aranda	Kawasaki	DNS	DNS			17	14	14	16	34	14	27	31			10	28	16	13	14	28	37	DNS	16	24	12	12	8	9	10	29	120
19	(Spain) Campano	Yamaha	16	15	26	24	18	19	33	DNS	DNS	DNS	17	14	18	15	16	18	21	20	30	14	19	30	17	17	15	6	15	11	25	26	99
20	(Germany) Schiffer	Suzuki	33	DNS	21	22					21	34	14	15	15	14	13	14	17	34	16	16					22	16	13	12	12	10	97
21	(Austria) Walkner	KTM	21	20	22	16					25	24	29	16	25	25	19	17	18	18	27	17	28	16	19	15	23	13	16	14	21	12	69
22	(Italy) Monni	Honda					19	28	16	15	35	15	34	DNS	DNS	DNS									18	18	19	15	14	13	11	11	68
23	(Netherlands) de Reuver	Yamaha	18	22	11	35	30	DNS	18	14			33	DNS					14	10	31	18	30	10	DNS	DNS							55
24	(France) Paulin	Yamaha																													1	2	47
25	(Austria) Schmidinger	Honda	20	18	37	23	24	24			18	19	DNS	18	19	17	21	23	20	19	20	DNS	35	27	14	14	21	17	19	17			46
26	(United Kingdom) Anderson	Honda																	19	11							9	7					38
27	(Belgium) van Daele	Honda																					14	11							15	14	30
28	(Netherlands) Brakke	Yamaha	24	32	24	21	20	31			23	23	20	17	DNS	DNS	24	21	25	21	DNS	DNS	15	17	27	21	25	19	31	19	18	17	27
29	(United Kingdom) Dougan	Yamaha	14	31	18	19	11	17	34	DNS	DNS	DNS																					26
30	(United States) Craig	Honda					8	13																									21
31	(Latvia) Steinbergs	Kawasaki	28	24	30	27	23	25			26	30	19	20	22	18	20	27	26	23	19	20	23	26	22	20	28	21	32	15	19	25	19
32	(United Kingdom) Church	KTM																					17	33	20	19	17	24	20	22	30	15	18
33	(New Zealand) Townley	Kawasaki			19	DNS					8	22	DNS	DNS																			15
34	(Estonia) Krestinov	Kawasaki			23	15															18	19					20	18					15
35	(France) Leonce	KTM	17	19																													15
35	(France) Leonce	Aprilia			32	30					17	35	30	DNS	27	24	17	20	33	29			29	DNS	21	25	26	22					15
36	(United Kingdom) MacKenzie	Kawasaki																									7	DNS					14
37	(Brazil) Balbi	Kawasaki							15	33																					23	13	14
38	(United Kingdom) Barr	KTM			13	33					22	26							24	33							18	DNS					11
39	(Denmark) Lynggaard	Kawasaki	23	30	38	36													30	25			31	22					18	16			8
40	(Belgium) Wouts	Kawasaki																	22	16			18	32									8
41	(United Kingdom) Smith	Aprilia	31	26	DNS	DNS					30	31	25	26	24	22	26	25	23	24			25	28	25	28	29	25	28	25	14	22	7
42	(New Zealand) Cooper	Suzuki																											26	21	16	19	7
43	(Portugal) Correia	Yamaha											16	19																			7
44	(Italy) Compagnone	Honda																													17	18	7
45	(Costa Rica) Castro	Honda							20	17																							5
46	(Finland) Pyrhönen	Honda																											17	30			4
47	(United Kingdom) Snow	Kawasaki																									24	20	21	18			4
48	(Norway) Nyegaard	Yamaha															18	22					32	29									3
49	(Portugal) Basaula	Kawasaki											18	23																			3
50	(United States) Peick	Kawasaki					31	18																									3
51	(Finland) Tiainen	Kawasaki			25	20	22	21	31	21	29	32	21	22	26	20	DNS	DNS					26	20	23	22	DNS	DNS					3
52	(Belgium) Delince	KTM	26	27	34	28					27	28	26	21	21	19			DNS	DNS									25	24			2
53	(Belgium) Martens	KTM	19	29	33	34							22	29	28	DNS	25	26	32	30			21	31									2
54	(Brazil) Paulino	Honda							22	19																							2
55	(France) Potisek	Kawasaki																					27	19									2
56	(Sweden) Lindström	Yamaha															30	19															2
57	(Finland) Eriksson	Kawasaki	DNS	DNS													23	24	27	22	24	22	33	DNS	28	27	27	23	23	23	22	20	1
58	(Denmark) Hansen	Suzuki																											22	20			1
59	(Italy) Valente	Suzuki																													20	23	1
60	(Netherlands) Reijnders	Suzuki																					20	23									1
61	(Argentina) Correa	Kawasaki							23	20																							1
62	(Spain) Lozano	Yamaha													20	27																	1
63	(Belgium) Lieber	Suzuki									20	33																					1
63	(Belgium) Lieber	KTM											DNS	DNS			29	DNS	DNS	DNS			DNS	DNS							DNS	DNS	1
64	(France) Soubeyras	KTM									32	20																					1
	(Latvia) Freibergs	Honda																			21	21											0
	(United States) Borkenhagen	Kawasaki					21	22																									0
	(France) Van Beveren	Yamaha																					22	21									0
	(Latvia) Justs	Honda	29	23	28	25					33	29	23	24	23	21			28	36	DNS	DNS											0
	(United Kingdom) Irwin	KTM	25	21	29	26					36	DNS																					0
	(Italy) Bracesco	Suzuki																													26	21	0
	(France) Larrieu	KTM									31	21																					0
	(Brazil) Silva	Honda							21	32																							0
	(Russia) Parshin	Honda	32	22																									24	26			0
	(Brazil) Feltz	Yamaha							27	22																							0
	(Sweden) Dahlgren	Honda															22	29															0
	(Lithuania) Bucas	Honda																			22	29											0
	(Germany) Sturm	Kawasaki					25	27	26	23							31	31													28	24	0
	(Czech Republic) Liska	Husaberg																							24	23							0
	(Estonia) Kaurit	KTM																			29	23											0
	(Belarus) Tyletski	KTM																			23	30											0
	(Netherlands) van Rooij	Kawasaki																					24	24									0
	(France) Adam	KTM									24	25																					0
	(Portugal) Marcos	Suzuki											24	25																			0
	(Latvia) Apfelbaums	Honda																			25	24											0
	(Italy) Maddii	KTM																													24	27	0
	(Brazil) Müller	Kawasaki							29	24																							0
	(Brazil) Ferreira	Honda							24	30																							0
	(Brazil) Pereira	Honda							28	25																							0
	(Brazil) Gentil	Honda							25	28																							0
	(Lithuania) Gelazninkas	Kawasaki																			26	26											0
	(United States) Stapleton	Yamaha					27	26																									0
	(United States) Gosselaar	Suzuki					26	29																									0
	(Uruguay) Cerdeña	Kawasaki							30	26																							0
	(Germany) Schaller	KTM																											27	27			0
	(Sweden) Sandberg	Kawasaki	30	28	27	29																											0
	(United Kingdom) Parker	KTM									28	27							DNS	DNS							30	DNS					0
	(Uruguay) Balduvino	Suzuki							32	27																							0
	(Hungary) Nemeth	KTM																	31	28													0
	(Switzerland) Furlato	Kawasaki																	29	35					DNS	DNS			DNS	DNS			0
	(Italy) Galligari	Honda					34	30	35	31			32	32																			0
	(Germany) Voss	Kawasaki																											30	DNS			0
	(Germany) Bihlmaier	Yamaha																											33	31			0
	(Sweden) Thuresson	KTM			35	31											DNS	DNS															0
	(Netherlands) van Vijfeijken	Kawasaki			31	DNS																											0
	(Netherlands) Verhoeven	Honda			36	32																											0
	(Sweden) Söderström	Suzuki	WD	WD													32	DNS															0
	(United States) Sleeter	KTM					32	DNS																									0
	(United States) Aponte	Honda					33	DNS																									0
	(Netherlands) Gijsel	Suzuki																					36	DNS									0
	(Ukraine) Ovcharenko	Yamaha	DNS	DNS																													0
	(Netherlands) Conen	Honda			DNS	DNS																											0
	(Brazil) Zenni	Honda							DNS	DNS																							0
Pos	Rider	Bike	BUL (Bulgaria)		NED (Netherlands)		USA (United States)		BRA (Brazil)		FRA (France)		POR (Portugal)		ESP (Spain)		SWE (Sweden)		GER (Germany)		LAT (Latvia)		LIM (Belgium)		LoketCZE (Czech Republic)		GBR (United Kingdom)		EUR (Europe)		ITA (Italy)		Pts

==== Manufacturers' Championship ====
Pos	Manufacturer	BUL (Bulgaria)		NED (Netherlands)		USA (United States)		BRA (Brazil)		FRA (France)		POR (Portugal)		ESP (Spain)		SWE (Sweden)		GER (Germany)		LAT (Latvia)		LIM (Belgium)		Loket (Czech Republic)		GBR (United Kingdom)		EUR (Europe)		ITA (Italy)		Pts
1	(Austria) KTM	3	6	1	1	2	2	1	2	2	3	2	2	2	1	5	2	2	2	1	1	1	1	1	4	3	1	3	2	21	12	630
2	(Japan) Yamaha	1	2	2	3	5	9	2	1	1	2	3	7	1	4	1	1	3	8	2	2	4	6	5	12	2	2	10	3	1	2	595
3	(Japan) Suzuki	2	1	5	6	1	1	4	3	9	1	1	1	5	3	6	5	5	3	8	6	2	4	2	1	13	8	5	5	3	4	562
4	(Japan) Honda	8	4	6	4	6	3	6	10	5	4	4	3	7	7	2	4	1	1	3	3	3	3	3	3	6	7	1	4	7	6	536
5	(Japan) Kawasaki	5	3	12	10	9	8	9	8	4	6	5	8	9	5	3	9	8	6	9	11	9	12	8	5	1	3	2	1	2	1	467
6	(Italy) TM	27	9	9	9	15	15	19	12	10	10	10	10	13	2	14	30	15	27	12	7	8	5	12	2	4	DNS	9	28	13	28	267
7	(Italy) Aprilia	31	26	32	30					17	31	25	26	24	22	17	20	23	24			25	28	21	25	26	22	28	25	14	22	16
	(Sweden) Husaberg																							24	23							0
Pos	Manufacturer	BUL (Bulgaria)		NED (Netherlands)		USA (United States)		BRA (Brazil)		FRA (France)		POR (Portugal)		ESP (Spain)		SWE (Sweden)		GER (Germany)		LAT (Latvia)		LIM (Belgium)		Loket (Czech Republic)		GBR (United Kingdom)		EUR (Europe)		ITA (Italy)		Pts

=== MX2 ===
==== Riders' Championship ====
Pos	Rider	Manufacturer	BUL (Bulgaria)		NED (Netherlands)		USA (United States)		BRA (Brazil)		FRA (France)		POR (Portugal)		ESP (Spain)		SWE (Sweden)		GER (Germany)		LAT (Latvia)		LIM (Belgium)		CZE (Czech Republic)		GBR (United Kingdom)		EUR (European Union)		ITA (Italy)		Points
1	(Germany) Roczen	KTM	1	1	2	2	1	1	1	2	1	11	1	30	1	1	1	1	1	3	1	1	2	2	1	1	1	1	1	3	5	28	651
2	(Netherlands) Herlings	KTM	5	3	1	1	2	2	2	1	7	2	2	2	3	4	3	2	2	4	3	2	1	1	2	2	7	3	5	2	2	1	632
3	(United Kingdom) Searle	Kawasaki	2	2	3	3	5	3	4	4	4	1	34	1	2	2	34	4	3	2	2	3	6	6	6	3	2	2	2	1	1	2	573
4	(France) Paulin	Yamaha	3	7	5	6	6	32	3	3	2	4	5	3	4	3	2	3	4	1	8	10	7	5	32	5	4	4	4	6			458
5	(Switzerland) Tonus	Yamaha	4	8	4	4	7	33	7	8	5	7	11	4	6	5	6	8	6	5	4	28	10	11	9	4	9	5	3	4	3	5	427
6	(United Kingdom) Anstie	Kawasaki	8	6	10	9	3	5	6	7	17	6	4	7	28	DNS	4	5	18	10	5	4	4	4	4	6	10	8	10	5	4	4	405
7	(France) Aubin	KTM	9	9	9	33	12	7	14	14	6	5	16	8	5	8	9	6	7	21	6	22	28	31	3	32	14	13	6	9	6	3	304
8	(United States) Osborne	Yamaha	7	4	6	8	9	4	5	5	3	3	3	5	30	6	11	10	5	6	7	5											295
9	(Finland) Kullas	Yamaha	10	14	7	7	4	11	11	9	10	9	10	9	10	10	16	11	13	11	9	6	9	8	13	10	13	10					287
10	(Belgium) Roelants	KTM	11	12	8	5	14	9	8	11	8	10	6	12	7	7	31	DNS					23	7	7	9	3	28	8	7	30	DNS	253
11	(United Kingdom) Nicholls	KTM									11	13	13	11	14	11	8	34	8	8	12	8	8	9	5	11	8	6	9	29	7	11	229
12	(France) Charlier	Yamaha	14	10	14	10	8	8	9	6	31	8	8	6	DNS	DNS	7	7	9	32	31	DNS			12	33	11	7	29	12	27	8	225
13	(France) Tixier	KTM	13	18	18	15	13	10	10	10	12	33	29	20	17	13	32	13	16	18	13	13	13	13	10	13	12	9	14	10	8	10	213
14	(Spain) Butron	KTM	17	19	13	14					14	20	9	10	11	26	29	35	11	9	11	31	16	12	11	28	34	11	12	11	10	7	172
15	(Italy) Lupino	Husqvarna	20	11	35	18	15	14	12	17	28	14	12	15	13	12	12	16	17	12	16	11	29	18	37	DNS			11	8	33	9	159
16	(Bulgaria) Petrov	Yamaha	18	27	34	11	11	18	16	24	21	18	15	17	15	21	14	14	15	30	14	12	5	23	16	12	18	16	13	13	32	30	140
17	(Belgium) van Horebeek	KTM	6	5													5	9	DNS	DNS	DNS	DNS	3	3	15	8	6	31	15	32			139
18	(Austria) Rauchenecker	KTM	16	16	17	36	18	13	13	12	15	17	27	21	29	18	21	22	19	15	23	21	15	15	14	30	17	12	28	14	11	6	127
19	(France) Teillet	Suzuki	37	35													10	12	10	7	10	7	14	16	8	7	5	29					105
20	(Belgium) Triest	KTM	22	17	22	17					16	12	14	13	8	15	15	15	12	22	18	29					36	14	17	17	12	29	104
21	(Netherlands) Coldenhoff	Yamaha	15	13	12	13					13	15	7	14	9	9	38	DNS															90
22	(Latvia) Karro	Honda	12	15													33	17	32	14	15	9	12	10	31	14							71
23	(Netherlands) Kras	Suzuki			15	30					22	22	19	18	12	17	18	20	34	16	19	16	11	14	19	29	20	19	18	31			65
24	(United States) Leib	Husqvarna	DNS	DNS									17	29	31	14	13	36	30	DNS	17	30	31	30	DNS	DNS			7	27	14	13	52
25	(Finland) Söderberg	Kawasaki	32	25	19	16	21	21	20	19	20	21	32	22	18	20	23	23	26	25	20	14	18	17	28	23	21	17	22	19	19	18	42
26	(Denmark) Larsen	KTM	36	DNS	11	12	16	15									17	37											27	30			34
27	(Norway) Heibye	KTM															19	32			33	15	30	DNS	20	21	16	33	20	15	15	16	32
28	(Italy) Monticelli	Honda	24	34	33	32	23	31	23	26	32	19			21	23	24	24	22	27	28	23	DNS	DNS	22	19	24	18	16	18	16	15	26
29	(Belgium) Lieber	KTM	19	33	36	28					27	35	31	23	22	22	20	18	24	17	25	19	20	26	34	27	23	21	19	16	17	27	24
30	(United Kingdom) Banks-Browne	Honda									9	16															15	35					23
31	(France) Ferrandis	Kawasaki																	DNS	DNS											9	12	21
32	(Sweden) Bengtsson	KTM															39	19					17	27	21	15	19	15					20
33	(Switzerland) Guillod	KTM	26	20	20	22	17	17	17	15																							20
34	(France) Musquin	KTM					19	6																									17
35	(France) Adam	Yamaha																							17	16	22	34	30	DNS	13	31	17
36	(United States) Baker	Honda					10	16																									16
37	(France) Lenoir	Yamaha	DNS	DNS							20	31	18	19	16	16	37	DNS															16
38	(France) Larrieu	KTM													DNS	DNS			14	13			32	28	35	DNS							15
39	(Brazil) Assunção	Honda							15	13																							14
40	(Germany) Oldekamp	KTM	25	28	16	29	30	22			34	25	22	16	25	19																	12
41	(Italy) Bertuzzo	Yamaha																													18	14	10
42	(Latvia) Justs	Honda	29	36	26	19													25	23	26	20	19	20	36	DNS	28	30	21	25	21	17	10
43	(United States) Champion	Honda					36	12																									9
44	(Brazil) Ramos	Honda							18	16																							8
45	(Estonia) Ratsep	Honda																							18	17							7
46	(Czech Republic) Smitka	TM	21	22	37	20					30	DNS							21	28	24	17	24	19	33	DNS							7
47	(Hungary) Szvoboda	KTM											21	32	24	30			33	19					23	18							5
48	(United Kingdom) Booker	KTM	27	23	21	23	27	34			23	23	28	33			22	31	23	20	22	18	21	25	26	24	26	22	23	22	31	20	5
49	(Italy) Zecchina	Suzuki									18	26	23	25	20	28																	4
50	(Brazil) Vilardi	KTM							28	18																							3
51	(Italy) Zeni	Suzuki																													20	19	3
52	(Italy) Del Segato	KTM	23	24	30	31					29	27	20	24	19	29	40	28	DNS	DNS	DNS	DNS			24	22	25	23	31	21	35	22	3
53	(Brazil) de Lima	Kawasaki							19	20																							3
54	(Italy) Cervellin	Husqvarna					35	19	22	22																							2
55	(Germany) Baudrexl	KTM																	20	31									32	20			2
56	(United Kingdom) Tombs	Honda					DNS	DNS																			30	20					1
57	(Latvia) Ivanovs	Kawasaki															30	21			30	32			38	20					22	25	1
58	(United States) D. Tedder	Kawasaki					24	20																									1
59	(United States) Tapia	KTM					20	26																									1
	(Brazil) Zanoni	Honda			27	21	28	23	DNS	DNS	24	24			23	27	25	26	29	DNS	21	27											0
	(Brazil) Cidade	Yamaha							21	21																							0
	(Russia) Golovkin	Kawasaki															28	30	27	26	27	26	26	21	29	31	31	25	24	24	24	33	0
	(Slovenia) Gercar	Yamaha	28	21	24	24																											0
	(Italy) Terraneo	KTM																													29	21	0
	(Zimbabwe) Mitchell	Honda	33	30	32	25	22	30			25	28	25	31	DNS	DNS	26	33	31	29			22	24	30	DNS	27	24	33	26	34	DNS	0
	(Moldova) Cociu	Honda	31	29	29	26					33	29	26	26	27	24	27	28	28	24	29	24	27	22	27	26	29	26	26	23	23	32	0
	(Brazil) Amaral	Honda							25	23																							0
	(Sweden) Söderström	Suzuki			23	34																											0
	(Italy) Marazzo	Honda																													28	23	0
	(Belgium) Plessers	Honda									26	32	24	27	26	25																	0
	(United States) Rossi	Yamaha					26	24																									0
	(Italy) Lucci	KTM																													26	24	0
	(Argentina) Schmit	Kawasaki							24	25																							0
	(United States) Lipanovich	Suzuki					25	25																									0
	(Italy) Pezzuto	KTM																							25	25							0
	(Netherlands) Meurs	KTM			25	37																											0
	(Sweden) Eriksson	KTM															35	25															0
	(Lithuania) Rukstela	Suzuki																			32	25											0
	(Italy) Bernardini	KTM																					25	29									0
	(Thailand) Penjan	Kawasaki																											25	28			0
	(Italy) Battig	KTM																													25	26	0
	(Italy) Maddii	KTM	30	26																													0
	(Brazil) Armstrong	Yamaha							26	28																							0
	(United States) Thacker	Kawasaki	34	32	31	27	32	29			36	30	30	28																			0
	(United States) M. Tedder	Kawasaki					29	27																									0
	(Sweden) Jonsson	Suzuki															36	27															0
	(Argentina) Ballari	Kawasaki					31	28																									0
	(Netherlands) Kouwenberg	KTM			28	35																											0
	(Bulgaria) Gochev	KTM	35	31																													0
	(United Kingdom) Strydom	KTM																									32	27					0
	(Republic of Ireland) Edmonds	TM									35	34															35	32					0
	(Brazil) de Castro	Honda							29	27																							0
	(United States) Raper	Kawasaki					33	DNS																									0
	(Philippines) San Andres	Suzuki					34	DNS																									0
	(Brazil) Montenegro	Honda							27	DNS																							0
	(Portugal) Fernandes	Honda											33	DNS																			0
	(United Kingdom) Cottrell	Honda																									33	DNS					0
	(Brazil) Garcia	Honda	DNS	DNS																													0
	(Venezuela) Martin	Honda							DNS	DNS																							0
	(Slovenia) Irt	Suzuki																											DNS	DNS			0
Pos	Rider	Manufacturer	BUL (Bulgaria)		NED (Netherlands)		USA (United States)		BRA (Brazil)		FRA (France)		POR (Portugal)		ESP (Spain)		SWE (Sweden)		GER (Germany)		LAT (Latvia)		LIM (Belgium)		CZE (Czech Republic)		GBR (United Kingdom)		EUR (European Union)		ITA (Italy)		Points

==== Manufacturers' Championship ====
Pos	Manufacturer	Points
1	(Austria) KTM	733
2	(Japan) Kawasaki	622
3	(Japan) Yamaha	561
4	(Sweden) Husqvarna	170
5	(Japan) Suzuki	165
6	(Japan) Honda	155
7	(Italy) TM	7

=== MX3 ===
==== Riders' Championship ====
Pos	Rider	Manufacturer	GRE (Greece)		BUL (Bulgaria)		FIN (Finland)		UMB (Umbria)		SVK (Slovakia)		UKR (Ukraine)		SLO (Slovenia)		FRA (France)		Points
1	(Switzerland) Julien Bill	Honda	1	C	3	3	1	1	1	1	2	1	2	1	1	1	1	1	359
2	(France) Milko Potisek	Honda	4	C	1	1	4	3	3	3	1	8	1	2	2	2	2	28	297
3	(Czech Republic) Martin Michek	KTM	9	C	2	2	3	7	2	2	3	2	3	5	8	3	3	2	287
4	(Finland) Antti Pyrhönen	Honda	6	C	6	5	2	4	5	4	8	4	7	4	3	7	4	3	255
5	(Czech Republic) Martin Žerava	Honda	10	C	4	6	8	6	7	6	6	5	4	3	7	4			202
6	(Italy) Marco Maddii	KTM	3	C	8	8	5	8	10	7	18	16	10	7	9	9	7	9	183
7	(Austria) Michael Staufer	KTM	5	C			18	14	6	8	7	6	6	6	4	6	5	6	177
8	(Czech Republic) Petř Michalec	Honda	21	C	10	9	12	13	35	12	14	14	9	8	19	8	11	12	122
9	(Slovenia) Sašo Kragelj	Yamaha			5	28			9	5	5	7			5	5			106
10	(Finland) Marko Kovalainen	Yamaha	38	C	12	10	11	32	12	17	13	13			36	15	14	11	82
11	(Bulgaria) Nikolai Kumanov	Yamaha	8	C	15	11			19	18	17	20	12	11	20	13	15	13	81
12	(France) Pierrick Roncin	Kawasaki	29	C	14	14	DNS	DNS	18	16	23	36	15	13	15	16	16	16	57
13	(Russia) Dmitry Parshin	Honda	2	C	7	4	DNS	DNS											54
14	(Finland) Riku Rouhiainen	Yamaha	17	C	16	13	7	9	36	14	20	19							53
15	(Switzerland) Grégory Wicht	Honda													10	37	8	4	42
16	(Slovakia) Martin Kohut	KTM									4	3							38
17	(Ukraine) Mykola Pashchynskyi	KTM									10	10	5	27					38
18	(Croatia) Nenad Šipek	Yamaha									19	11			6	11			37
19	(Estonia) Juss Laansoo	KTM	11	C	9	7	DNS	DNS											36
20	(Estonia) Lauri Lethla	KTM	12	C	13	12	34	12	20	35	37	DNS							36
21	(Spain) Adrián Garrido	Honda					21	16	17	11	15	12							34
22	(New Zealand) Joel Doeksen	KTM	20	C	19	20			23	13	22	23	14	12	26	26	29	19	30
23	(France) Morgan Jacquelin	Kawasaki															6	7	29
24	(France) Brice Bonnemoy	Yamaha															9	5	28
25	(Latvia) Lauris Freibergs	Honda					9	5											28
26	(Slovenia) Theo Urbas	Kawasaki							16	21	21	39			16	14	18	14	27
27	(Italy) Alessandro Valente	Suzuki							11	15					11	31			26
28	(Ukraine) Oleksandr Pashchynskyi	KTM											8	10					24
29	(Czech Republic) Petř Bartoš	KTM									9	9							24
30	(Ukraine) Roman Morozov	Kawasaki			11	27							29	9					22
31	(Sweden) Tom Söderström	Suzuki					29	2											22
32	(Switzerland) Alain Schäfer	Honda											30	23			13	8	21
33	(France) Charley Ribet	Yamaha															12	10	20
34	(Switzerland) Christopher Valente	KTM	22	C	17	18	24	22	15	24	39	28			30	22	17	18	20
35	(Italy) Luca Fontanesi	Yamaha	7	C			20	18	24	20	31	29			23	23	21	26	19
36	(Italy) Alessandro Pagliacci	Honda							14	9									19
37	(Slovakia) Tomas Simko	TM							13	10									19
38	(Italy) Daniele Bricca	Honda							4	34									18
39	(Netherlands) Ceriel Klein Kromhof	Honda													13	12	DNS	DNS	17
40	(Belarus) Evgeni Tyletski	KTM											11	15					16
41	(Finland) Toni Eriksson	Kawasaki					6	31											15
42	(France) Yann Charron	Kawasaki															10	17	15
43	(Ukraine) Andriy Krychfalushiy	Yamaha											13	14					15
44	(France) Christophe Martin	Honda							8	39									13
45	(Spain) Txomin Arana	Yamaha	13	C	18	29	26	21	25	36	28	38			31	28	20	20	13
46	(Austria) Andreas Schmidinger	Honda													12	18			12
47	(Austria) Peter Reitbauer	KTM									12	18			32	30			12
48	(Belgium) Dimitry Camus	Yamaha	15	C	22	15			38	32	40	26			33	33	28	21	12
49	(Austria) Oswald Reisinger	Suzuki													35	10			11
50	(Finland) Atte Jousi	Yamaha					31	10											11
51	(Finland) Samuli Aro	KTM					10	33											11
52	(Austria) Marco Schögler	KTM									16	15			34	DNS			11
53	(Slovakia) Jozef Kulhavy	KTM									11	37							10
54	(Latvia) Niks Apfelbaums	Honda					35	11											10
55	(Finland) Henric Stigell	Kawasaki					17	15											10
56	(Austria) Stefan Hauer	KTM	27	C			30	29	37	37	33	30	16	16	37	32	27	DNS	10
57	(Slovenia) Toni Mulec	Suzuki							22	19	25	22			17	17			10
58	(Finland) Joonas Heimonen	Husqvarna					13	34											8
59	(Switzerland) Romain Jacquiot	Yamaha															19	15	8
60	(Czech Republic) Petř Stloukal	Yamaha													14	21			7
61	(Sweden) Kim Lindström	Yamaha					14	26											7
62	(Greece) Manolis Skivalos	Honda	14	C															7
63	(Finland) Miika Mäkinen	Honda					15	20											7
64	(Finland) Rolle Leinonen	KTM					16	19											7
65	(Italy) Mattia Buso	KTM					27	25	30	28	32	33	18	18	DNS	DNS	25	23	6
66	(Bulgaria) Nikolay Yovchev	Honda			30	16													5
67	(Greece) Vasilis Siafarikas	Honda	16	C															5
68	(Bulgaria) Georgi Gochev	KTM			20	17													5
69	(Ukraine) Igor Lubomirsky	Honda											21	17					4
70	(Ukraine) Dmytro Asmanov	Kawasaki											17	29					4
71	(Slovakia) Vít Stránský	KTM									30	17			24	38			4
72	(Estonia) Rannar Uusna	KTM					33	17											4
73	(Ukraine) Valentyn Andriec	KTM											19	19					4
74	(Slovenia) Deni Ušaj	Suzuki													18	36			3
75	(Estonia) Heido Havam	KTM	18	C	21	21	23	24											3
76	(Netherlands) Stijn Blom	KTM													21	19			2
77	(Estonia) Ardo Kaurit	KTM					19	27											2
78	(Italy) Francesco Ombrosi	KTM			24	19													2
79	(Greece) Spiros Kosmas	KTM	19	C															2
80	(Ukraine) Ruslan Pavluk	Kawasaki											20	20					2
81	(Hungary) Balázs Déczi	KTM													27	20			1
	(Ukraine) Yuriy Tsioka	Yamaha											22	21					0
	(Slovakia) Andrej Bilcik	Kawasaki									24	21							0
	(Italy) Gioele Meoni	KTM							21	31									0
	(Ukraine) Mykola Chen	Yamaha			28	25							23	22					0
	(Spain) Aleix Casanovas	Honda							27	25							24	22	0
	(Bulgaria) Christian Angelov	Yamaha			25	22													0
	(Austria) Philip Rüf	Honda							29	22									0
	(Chile) Alejandro Noemi	Honda					22	30											0
	(Slovenia) Erik Slavec	KTM													22	29			0
	(Switzerland) Timothy Jaunin	Honda															22	25	0
	(Belgium) Loic Begon	Yamaha													DNS	DNS	23	24	0
	(Finland) Seppo Manninen	Honda					25	23											0
	(Bulgaria) Ismet Bekirov	Kawasaki			27	23													0
	(Italy) Stefano Barbieri	Suzuki							28	23									0
	(Bulgaria) Teodor Totev	Kawasaki			23	29													0
	(Greece) Stelios Galatianos	Yamaha	23	C															0
	(Bulgaria) Kristian Krastev	Yamaha			26	24													0
	(Ukraine) Oleksandr Dovgan	Honda											26	24					0
	(Slovakia) Richard Szolga	Honda									38	24							0
	(Ukraine) Andriy Malaev	KTM											24	28					0
	(Croatia) Danijel Bozic	KTM													39	24			0
	(Greece) George Iliopoulos	KTM	24	C															0
	(Ukraine) Oleg Skrypnikov	Honda											25	25					0
	(Austria) Stefan Ziegler	KTM									27	25							0
	(Czech Republic) Jan Brabec	Kawasaki									36	35			25	34			0
	(Slovenia) Dejan Zver	Kawasaki													29	25			0
	(Cyprus) Savva Savvas	Yamaha	25	C															0
	(Italy) Nicolo Di Luccia	Honda							26	26									0
	(Ukraine) Mykhaylo Moravskyy	Honda											28	26					0
	(Bulgaria) Borislav Stoimenov	KTM			29	26													0
	(Slovakia) Juraj Popovicz	Honda									26	32							0
	(France) Arnaud Degousee	TM															26	27	0
	(Greece) Ioannis Touratzidis	Yamaha	26	C															0
	(Slovakia) Bohuslav Radek	KTM									29	27							0
	(Italy) Danny Gambarotti	Kawasaki							31	27									0
	(Ukraine) Sergeiy Levchenko	Yamaha											27	30					0
	(Austria) Patrick Wimmer	Kawasaki													38	27			0
	(Austria) David Kraus	KTM													28	35			0
	(Italy) Gianmarco Spagna	Yamaha							33	29									0
	(Italy) Marco Bagnarelli	Honda							34	30									0
	(Slovakia) Jakub Hruska	KTM									34	31							0
	(Italy) Jacapo Soccolini	Yamaha							32	33									0
	(Slovakia) Tomas Valach	Kawasaki									DNS	34							0
	(Czech Republic) Tomas Hrdinka	KTM					28	28			35	40							0
	(Italy) Martino Vestri	TM							40	38									0
	(Cyprus) George Papaloizos	Kawasaki	28	C															0
	(Greece) Nikos Andreou	Yamaha	30	C															0
	(Cyprus) Lambros Tsaggaras	KTM	31	C															0
	(Cyprus) Chrysanthos Charalambous	KTM	32	C															0
	(Greece) Dimitrios Kontoletas	Yamaha	33	C															0
	(Cyprus) Romario Nikolaides	KTM	34	C															0
	(Cyprus) George Taliadoros	Kawasaki	35	C															0
	(Cyprus) Loizos Kallinos	Kawasaki	36	C															0
	(Cyprus) George Siderenios	Kawasaki	37	C															0
	(Finland) Juuso Matikainen	Honda					32	DNS											0
	(Austria) Erwin Schuster	Aprilia							39	DNS									0
	(Bulgaria) Todor Totev	Honda			DNS	DNS													0
	(Slovenia) Rok Bekanovic	Yamaha			DNS	DNS													0
	(Ukraine) Andriy Burenko	Yamaha											DNS	DNS					0
	(Ukraine) Sergeiy Kononov	KTM											DNS	DNS					0
	(Croatia) Marko Leljak	KTM													DNS	DNS			0
	(Austria) Roman Wallisch	Kawasaki													DNS	DNS			0
	(Greece) Panagiotis Kouzis	Husqvarna	DNS	C															0
	(Greece) Dimitris Vagelakos	Yamaha	DNS	C															0
	(Cyprus) George Mappis	KTM	DNS	C															0
Pos	Rider	Manufacturer	GRE (Greece)		BUL (Bulgaria)		FIN (Finland)		UMB (Umbria)		SVK (Slovakia)		UKR (Ukraine)		SLO (Slovenia)		FRA (France)		Points

==== Manufacturers' Championship ====
Pos	Manufacturer	Points
1	(Japan) Honda	375
2	(Austria) KTM	300
3	(Japan) Yamaha	204
4	(Japan) Kawasaki	108
5	(Japan) Suzuki	59
6	(Italy) TM	19
7	(Sweden) Husqvarna	8
8	(Italy) Aprilia	0

== Participants ==
- Riders with red background numbers are defending champions. All riders were announced with numbers on February 23, 2011.

=== MX1 participants ===
Team	Constructor	No	Rider	Rounds
Red Bull Teka KTM Factory Racing MX1	KTM	2	(Germany) Maximilian Nagl	All
Red Bull Teka KTM Factory Racing MX1	KTM	222	(Italy) Antonio Cairoli	All
TM Racing Factory Team	TM	6	(Estonia) Tanel Leok	All
Kawasaki Racing Team	Kawasaki	7	(Spain) Jonathan Barragán	All
Kawasaki Racing Team	Kawasaki	65	(Netherlands) Ronnie van Rooi	11
Kawasaki Racing Team	Kawasaki	121	(France) Xavier Boog	All
LS Honda Racing	Honda	9	(Belgium) Ken De Dycker	1–12
LS Honda Racing	Honda	24	(United Kingdom) Shaun Simpson	All
LS Honda Racing	Honda	60	(Belgium) Marvin van Daele	15
Marvin van Daele	Honda	60	(Belgium) Marvin van Daele	11
Monster Energy Yamaha	Yamaha	10	(France) Anthony Boissière	All
Monster Energy Yamaha	Yamaha	19	(Italy) David Philippaerts	1–11
Monster Energy Yamaha	Yamaha	183	(France) Steven Frossard	1–14
Monster Energy Yamaha	Yamaha	321	(France) Gautier Paulin	15
Monster Energy Yamaha	Yamaha	115	(Spain) Carlos Campano Jiménez	13–15
Andalucía Yamaha Castro Team	Yamaha	115	(Spain) Carlos Campano Jiménez	1–12
Rockstar Energy Suzuki World MX1	Suzuki	11	(Belgium) Steve Ramon	1–11
Rockstar Energy Suzuki World MX1	Suzuki	22	(Belgium) Kevin Strijbos	12–15
Rockstar Energy Suzuki World MX1	Suzuki	25	(Belgium) Clément Desalle	1–12
Rockstar Energy Suzuki World MX1	Suzuki	902	(New Zealand) Cody Cooper	14–15
L.P.E. Kawasaki	Kawasaki	12	(United Kingdom) Billy MacKenzie	13
Salucci Racing	Honda	13	(Italy) Manuel Monni	3–7, 12–15
Salucci Racing	Honda	531	(Italy) Francesco Galligari	3–4, 6
Team Yamaha Van Beers Racing	Yamaha	14	(Netherlands) Marc de Reuver	1–4, 6, 9–12
Team Yamaha Van Beers Racing	Yamaha	61	(Netherlands) Herjan Brakke	1–3, 5–15
Oleksiy Ovcharenko Racing	Yamaha	16	(Ukraine) Oleksiy Ovcharenko	1
Rockstar Bud Racing Lovemytime Kawasaki	Kawasaki	20	(France) Grégory Aranda	1, 3–6, 8–15
Rockstar Bud Racing Lovemytime Kawasaki	Kawasaki	39	(Italy) Davide Guarneri	1–15
Bike-it Cosworth Wild Wolf Yamaha	Yamaha	21	(United Kingdom) Jason Dougan	1–5
Bike-it Cosworth Wild Wolf Yamaha	Yamaha	28	(Spain) Álvaro Lozano Rico	7
Delta	Suzuki	22	(Belgium) Kevin Strijbos	1–11
Delta	Suzuki	17	(Sweden) Tom Söderström	1
Sturm Racing Team	Suzuki	17	(Sweden) Tom Söderström	8
Sturm Racing Team	Kawasaki	35	(United States) Weston Peick	3
Sturm Racing Team	Kawasaki	55	(France) Milko Potisek	11
Sturm Racing Team	Kawasaki	63	(Germany) Robert Sturm	3–4, 8, 15
Sturm Racing Team	Kawasaki	70	(Switzerland) Yves Furlato	9, 12, 14
Sturm Racing Team	Kawasaki	146	(Germany) Jens Voss	14
Sturm Racing Team	Kawasaki	215	(Denmark) Kasper Lynggaard	1–2, 9, 11, 14
Sturm Racing Team	Kawasaki	717	(Sweden) Rickard Sandberg	1–2
Sturm Racing Team	Kawasaki	903	(Brazil) Antonio Jorge Balbi	4, 15
DIGA Racing Team	KTM	26	(Belgium) Jeremy Delince	1–2, 5–7, 9, 14
Lieber Racing Team	Suzuki	30	(Belgium) Cédric Lieber	5
Lieber Racing Team	KTM	30	(Belgium) Cédric Lieber	6, 8–9, 11, 15
Kim Lindström	Yamaha	31	(Sweden) Kim Lindström	8
Bart Conen	Honda	32	(Netherlands) Bart Conen	2
Gert Krestinov Racing	Kawasaki	37	(Estonia) Gert Krestinov	2, 10, 13
Gino Aponte	Honda	40	(United States) Gino Aponte	3
JK Aprilia Racing	Aprilia	41	(United Kingdom) Alfie Smith	1–2, 5–9, 11–15
JK Aprilia Racing	Aprilia	45	(France) Loic Leonce	2, 5–9, 11–13
BGR	KTM	45	(France) Loic Leonce	1
BGR	KTM	52	(Austria) Matthias Walkner	1–2, 5–15
Michael Sleeter	KTM	42	(United States) Michael Sleeter	3
Caleb Gosselaar	Suzuki	43	(United States) Caleb Gosselaar	3
Agustín Cerdeña	Kawasaki	44	(Uruguay) Agustín Cerdeña Fearne	4
Pablo Balduvino	Suzuki	47	(Uruguay) Pablo Balduvino	4
Team Gold Fren Schmidinger World MX1	Honda	49	(Austria) Günter Schmidinger	1–3, 5–14
Martin Barr	KTM	50	(United Kingdom) Martin Barr	2, 5, 9, 13
João Paulo Feltz	Yamaha	53	(Brazil) João Paulo Feltz	4
Brad Anderson Racing	Honda	54	(United Kingdom) Brad Anderson	9, 13
Sean Borkenhagen Racing	Kawasaki	56	(United States) Sean Borkenhagen	3
ICE1 RACING	Kawasaki	67	(Finland) Santtu Tiainen	2–8, 11–13
ICE1 RACING	Kawasaki	127	(Finland) Toni Eriksson	1, 8–15
Beursfoon Suzuki PRO MX	Suzuki	68	(Netherlands) Stuwey Reijnders	11
Maik Schaller	KTM	69	(Germany) Maik Schaller	14
Roy Gijsel	Suzuki	71	(Netherlands) Roy Gijsel	11
Kharovsk Extreme	Honda	73	(Russia) Dimitry Parshin	1, 14
IST T.I.S.C.O. Racing	Kawasaki	74	(Latvia) Ivo Steinbergs	1–3, 5–15
Kawasaki ELF Team Pfeil	Kawasaki	75	(Belgium) Kevin Wouts	9, 11
Nicolai Hansen	Suzuki	76	(Denmark) Nicolai Hansen	14
David Adam	KTM	77	(France) David Adam	5
Bas Verhoeven Racing	Honda	78	(Netherlands) Bas Verhoeven	2
Alex Snow	Kawasaki	82	(United Kingdom) Alex Snow	13–14
Skatty Bihlmaier	Yamaha	83	(Germany) Skatty Bihlmaier	14
Suzuki Hobby Motor	Suzuki	84	(Italy) Federico Bracesco	15
Team Pardi Racing	Honda	85	(Italy) Felice Compagnone	15
Rob van Vijfeijken	Kawasaki	86	(Netherlands) Rob van Vijfeijken	2
Filip Thuresson	KTM	91	(Sweden) Filip Thuresson	2, 8
Latvia Elksni Honda	Honda	95	(Latvia) Augusts Justs	1–2, 5–7, 9–10
Evgeni Tyletski	KTM	97	(Belarus) Evgeni Tyletski	10
Sandro Marcos	Suzuki	100	(Portugal) Sandro Marcos	6
Team CLS – Monster Energy – Kawasaki – Pro Circuit	Kawasaki	101	(New Zealand) Ben Townley	2, 5–6
Team CLS – Monster Energy – Kawasaki – Pro Circuit	Kawasaki	377	(France) Christophe Pourcel	9, 12–15
Kornel Nemeth	KTM	108	(Hungary) Kornel Nemeth	9
Leandro Silva	Honda	114	(Brazil) Leandro da Silva Nunes	4
Roberto Castro	Honda	119	(Costa Rica) Roberto Castro Miranda	4
Cédric Soubeyras	KTM	120	(France) Cédric Soubeyras	5
Niks Apfelbaums	Honda	133	(Latvia) Niks Apfelbaums	10
HM Plant Red Bull KTM UK	KTM	141	(United Kingdom) Tom Church	11–15
HM Plant Red Bull KTM UK	KTM	555	(United Kingdom) Graeme Irwin	1–2, 5
Nathan Parker	KTM	142	(United Kingdom) Nathan Parker	5, 9, 13
Christian Craig	Honda	144	(United States) Christian Craig	3
Gustavo Pereira	Honda	150	(Brazil) Gustavo Pereira do Amaral	4
Marcelo Ferreira	Honda	151	(Brazil) Marcelo Ferreira de Lima	4
KTM Maddii	KTM	153	(Italy) Marco Maddii	15
Rafael Zenni	Honda	154	(Brazil) Rafael Zenni	4
Lauris Freibergs	Honda	156	(Latvia) Lauris Freibergs	10
Marçal Müller	Kawasaki	171	(Brazil) Marçal Müller	4
Ardo Kaurit	KTM	174	(Estonia) Ardo Kaurit	10
Gabriel Gentil	Honda	180	(Brazil) Gabriel Bitencourt Gentil	4
Dennis Stapleton	Yamaha	184	(United States) Dennis Stapleton	3
Vytautas Bucas	Honda	198	(Lithuania) Vytautas Bucas	10
Wolff KTM	KTM	202	(France) Loic Larrieu	5
Jonathan Dahlgren	Honda	211	(Sweden) Jonathan Dahlgren	8
Antti Pyrhönen	Honda	213	(Finland) Antti Pyrhönen	14
Team Valenti Motocross	Suzuki	221	(Italy) Alessandro Valente	15
Mira Racing Team	Husaberg	239	(Czech Republic) Patrik Liska	12
Remi Nyegaard	Yamaha	260	(Norway) Remi Nyegaard	8, 11
Suzuki International Europe Motocross	Suzuki	287	(Germany) Marcus Schiffer	1–2, 5–10, 13–15
Luis Correia	Yamaha	311	(Portugal) Luis Correia	6
Nestaan JM Racing KTM	KTM	387	(Belgium) Yentel Martens	1–2, 6–9, 11
João Paulino da Silva	Honda	411	(Brazil) João Paulino da Silva	4
Adrien van Beveren	Yamaha	442	(France) Adrien van Beveren	11
Luis Correa	Kawasaki	523	(Argentina) Luis Correa	4
Hugo Basaula	Kawasaki	747	(Portugal) Hugo Basaula	6
Arunas Gelazninkas	Kawasaki	771	(Lithuania) Arunas Gelazninkas	10
Honda World Motocross	Honda	777	(Russia) Evgeny Bobryshev	1–12, 14–15
Honda World Motocross	Honda	999	(Portugal) Rui Gonçalves	All

Key
Regular Rider
Wildcard Rider
Replacement Rider

=== MX2 participants ===
Team	Constructor	No	Rider	Rounds
Red Bull Teka KTM Factory Racing MX2	KTM	1	(France) Marvin Musquin	3
Red Bull Teka KTM Factory Racing MX2	KTM	84	(Netherlands) Jeffrey Herlings	All
Red Bull Teka KTM Factory Racing MX2	KTM	89	(Belgium) Jeremy van Horebeek	1, 8–14
Red Bull Teka KTM Factory Racing MX2	KTM	94	(Germany) Ken Roczen	All
Bike-it Cosworth Wild Wolf Yamaha	Yamaha	7	(Switzerland) Arnaud Tonus	All
Bike-it Cosworth Wild Wolf Yamaha	Yamaha	338	(United States) Zachary Osborne	1–10
Suzuki Europe MX2	Suzuki	12	(Italy) Simone Zecchina	5–7
Suzuki Europe MX2	Suzuki	37	(France) Valentin Teillet	1, 8–13
Damon Strydom	KTM	14	(United Kingdom) Damon Strydom	13
KTM Silver Action	KTM	17	(Spain) José Butrón	1–2, 5–15
KTM Silver Action	KTM	123	(Italy) Samuele Bernardini	11
KTM Silver Action	KTM	262	(Italy) Giacomo Del Segato	1–2, 5–10, 12–15
KTM Scott Racing Team UG	KTM	20	(Hungary) Bence Svoboda	6–7, 9, 12
KTM Scott Racing Team UG	KTM	79	(Germany) Lars Oldekamp	1–3, 5–7
KTM Scott Racing Team UG	KTM	112	(Norway) Even Heibye	10–15
KTM Scott Racing Team UG	KTM	173	(Switzerland) Valentin Guillod	1–4
KTM Scott Racing Team UG	KTM	202	(France) Loic Larrieu	9, 11–12
Wolff KTM	KTM	202	(France) Loic Larrieu	7
Monster Energy Yamaha	Yamaha	21	(France) Gautier Paulin	1–14
Monster Energy Yamaha	Yamaha	151	(Finland) Harri Kullas	1–13
Monster Energy Yamaha	Yamaha	430	(France) Christophe Charlier	1–10, 12–15
Philippine Motocross Team	Suzuki	23	(Philippines) Kenneth San Andres	3
Jumbo TVE	Yamaha	25	(Netherlands) Glenn Coldenhoff	1–2, 5–8
Tevin Tapia	KTM	27	(United States) Tevin Tapia	3
Thales Vilardi	KTM	30	(Brazil) Thales Vilardi Felix da Silva	4
Anderson Hauptli	Yamaha	31	(Brazil) Anderson Hauptli Cidade	4
Lieber Racing Team	KTM	33	(Belgium) Julien Lieber	1–2, 5–15
Nestaan JM Racing KTM	KTM	34	(Belgium) Joel Roelants	1–8, 11–15
Nestaan JM Racing KTM	KTM	76	(Austria) Pascal Rauchenecker	All
Nestaan JM Racing KTM	KTM	911	(France) Jordi Tixier	All
Kawasaki Srisakon Team	Kawasaki	40	(Thailand) Penjan Thanarat	14
Pulse DB Racing	Honda	44	(United Kingdom) Elliott Banks-Browne	5, 13
Pulse DB Racing	Honda	860	(United Kingdom) James Cottrell	13
HM Plant Red Bull KTM UK	KTM	45	(United Kingdom) Jake Nicholls	5–15
HM Plant Red Bull KTM UK	KTM	114	(United Kingdom) Jordan Booker	1–3, 5–15
Jesper Jonssen	Suzuki	46	(Sweden) Jesper Jonssen	8
Beursfoon Suzuki MX Team	Suzuki	55	(Netherlands) Mike Kras	2, 5–14
3C Racing Yamaha	Yamaha	62	(Slovenia) Klemen Gercar	1–2
3C Racing Yamaha	Yamaha	685	(France) Steven Lenoir	1, 5–8
Filip Bengtsson	KTM	64	(Sweden) Filip Bengtsson	8, 11–13
David Adam	Yamaha	68	(France) David Adam	12–15
DIGA Racing Team	KTM	71	(Sweden) Alexander Eriksson	8
DIGA Racing Team	KTM	590	(Belgium) Nick Triest	1–2, 5–10, 13–15
Team Husqvarna – Ricci Racing	Husqvarna	77	(Italy) Alessandro Lupino	1–12, 14–15
Team Husqvarna – Ricci Racing	Husqvarna	141	(Italy) Andrea Cervellin	3–4
Team Husqvarna – Ricci Racing	Husqvarna	170	(United States) Michael Leib	1, 6–12, 14–15
Scott Champion	Honda	85	(United States) Scott Champion	3
MVR-D Honda	Honda	66	(United Kingdom) Lewis Tombs	3, 13
MVR-D Honda	Honda	91	(Latvia) Matiss Karro	1, 8–12
MVR-D Honda	Honda	550	(Zimbabwe) Sean Mitchell	1–3, 5–9
Sean Mitchell	KTM	550	(Zimbabwe) Sean Mitchell	11–15
Team CLS – Monster Energy – Kawasaki – Pro Circuit	Kawasaki	99	(United Kingdom) Max Anstie	All
Team CLS – Monster Energy – Kawasaki – Pro Circuit	Kawasaki	100	(United Kingdom) Tommy Searle	All
TM Racing Factory Team	TM	102	(Czech Republic) Petr Smitka	1–2, 5, 9–12
Nerijus Rukstela	Suzuki	111	(Lithuania) Nerijus Rukstela	10
Even Heibye	KTM	112	(Norway) Even Heibye	8
Paolo Lucci	KTM	116	(Italy) Paolo Lucci	15
Tom Söderström Racing	Suzuki	117	(Sweden) Tom Söderström	2
Jean Ramos	Honda	118	(Brazil) Jean Carlo Ramos	4
Jernej Irt	Suzuki	120	(Slovenia) Jernej Irt	14
Wellington Garcia	Honda	121	(Brazil) Wellington Garcia	1
Rockstar Bud Racing Lovemytime	Kawasaki	122	(France) Dylan Ferrandis	9, 15
Ivo Monticelli Racing	Honda	128	(Italy) Ivo Monticelli	1–5, 7–15
KTM HDI MX Team	KTM	131	(France) Nicolas Aubin	All
Myles Tedder	Kawasaki	133	(United States) Myles Tedder	3
Team Yamaha van Beers Racing	Yamaha	152	(Bulgaria) Petar Petrov	All
BGR	KTM	153	(Italy) Marco Maddii	1
Agustin Ballari	Kawasaki	155	(Argentina) Agustin Ballari	3
Stuart Edmonds	TM	162	(Republic of Ireland) Stuart Edmonds	5, 13
Dario Marazzo	Honda	165	(Italy) Dario Marazzo	15
Dakota Tedder	Kawasaki	166	(United States) Dakota Tedder	3
Pierfilippo Bertuzzo	Yamaha	171	(Italy) Pierfilippo Bertuzzo	15
Latvia Elksni Honda	Honda	195	(Latvia) Roberts Justs	1–2, 9–15
Latvia Elksni Honda	Honda	495	(Belgium) Mathias Plessers	5–7
Latvia Elksni Honda	Honda	611	(Moldova) Mihail Cociu	1–2, 5–15
Georgi Gochev Racing	KTM	211	(Bulgaria) Georgi Gochev	1
Samuel Zeni	Suzuki	214	(Italy) Samuel Zeni	15
Anderson Pereira	Honda	220	(Brazil) Anderson Pereira do Amaral	4
Endrews Armstrong	Honda	221	(Brazil) Endrews Armstrong Nhemmes	4
Rodrigo De Castro	Honda	222	(Brazil) Rodrigo de Castro Rodrigues	4
Gabriel Montenegro	Honda	223	(Brazil) Gabriel Ferreira Montenegro	4
Priit Rätsep	Honda	227	(Estonia) Priit Rätsep	12
Hector Assunção	Honda	230	(Brazil) Hector Assunção de Freitas	4
Eduardo Ferreira	Kawasaki	238	(Brazil) Eduardo Ferreira de Lima	4
SRS Racing	KTM	249	(Denmark) Nikolaj Larsen	1–3, 8, 14
IST T.I.S.C.O. Racing	Kawasaki	300	(Russia) Viacheslav Golovkin	8–15
IST T.I.S.C.O. Racing	Kawasaki	339	(United States) Michael Thacker	1–3, 5–6
ICE1 Racing	Kawasaki	388	(Finland) Ludvig Söderberg	All
Ivo Fernandes	Honda	501	(Portugal) Ivo Fernandes	6
Sean Lipanovich Racing	Suzuki	505	(United States) Sean Lipanovich	3
Dennis Baudrexl	Honda	519	(Germany) Dennis Baudrexl	9
Dennis Baudrexl	KTM	519	(Germany) Dennis Baudrexl	14
Marco Schmit	Kawasaki	523	(Argentina) Marco Schmit	4
Travis Baker	Honda	585	(United States) Travis Baker	3
Davis Ivanovs	Kawasaki	600	(Latvia) Davis Ivanovs	8, 10, 12, 15
Stefano Terraneo	KTM	618	(Italy) Stefano Terraneo	15
Joey Rossi	Yamaha	628	(United States) Joey Rossi	3
Honda World Motocross	Honda	777	(Brazil) Swian Zanoni	2–5, 7–10
Nick Kouwenberg	KTM	824	(Netherlands) Nick Kouwenberg	2
Alessandro Battig	KTM	837	(Italy) Alessandro Battig	15
Stefano Pezzuto	KTM	878	(Italy) Stefano Pezzuto	12
Jeffrey Meurs	KTM	941	(Netherlands) Jeffrey Meurs	2
Humberto Martin	Honda	981	(Venezuela) Humberto Martin	4

Key
Regular Rider
Wildcard Rider
Replacement Rider

=== MX3 participants ===
No	Rider	Constructor	Rounds
2	(Switzerland) Julien Bill	Honda	All
5	(France) Milko Potisek	Honda	All
7	(Switzerland) Christopher Valente	KTM	1–5, 7–8
9	(Switzerland) Gregory Wicht	Honda	7–8
12	(Slovenia) Toni Mulec	Suzuki	4–5, 7
14	(Austria) Oswald Reisinger	Suzuki	7
17	(Czech Republic) Josef Kulhavy	TM	4
18	(Austria) Marco Schogler	KTM	5, 7
19	(Spain) Txomin Arana	Yamaha	1–5, 7–8
20	(France) Yann Charron	Kawasaki	8
21	(Italy) Gioele Meoni	KTM	4
22	(France) Christophe Martin	Honda	4
24	(Slovenia) Theo Urbas	Kawasaki	4–5, 7–8
25	(Bulgaria) Christian Krastev	Yamaha	2
26	(Bulgaria) Christian Angelov	Yamaha	2
27	(Finland) Toni Eriksson	Kawasaki	3
29	(Bulgaria) Ismet Bekirov	Kawasaki	2
30	(Bulgaria) Borislav Stoimenov	KTM	2
31	(Bulgaria) Teodor Totev	Kawasaki	2
32	(Italy) Danny Gambarotti	Kawasaki	4
33	(Croatia) Danijel Bozic	KTM	7
34	(Italy) Marco Bagnarelli	Honda	4
35	(Italy) Daniele Bricca	Honda	4
37	(Sweden) Tom Söderström	Suzuki	3
38	(Finland) Riku Rouhiainen	Yamaha	1–5
39	(Czech Republic) Petr Bartos	KTM	5
40	(Slovakia) Tomas Valach	Kawasaki	5
41	(Finland) Rolle Leinonen	KTM	3
44	(Finland) Henric Stigell	Kawasaki	3
45	(Finland) Atte Jousi	Yamaha	3
48	(Austria) Andreas Schmidinger	Honda	7
49	(Finland) Joonas Heimonen	Husqvarna	3
52	(Italy) Jacopo Soccolini	Yamaha	4
53	(Italy) Gianmarco Spagna	Yamaha	4
54	(Italy) Martino Vestri	TM	4
57	(Netherlands) Ceriel Klein Kromhof	Honda	7–8
58	(Spain) Aleix Casanovas	Honda	4, 8
59	(Austria) Roman Wallisch	Kawasaki	7
60	(Cyprus) Savva Savvas	Yamaha	1
62	(Cyprus) George Siderenios	Kawasaki	1
63	(Cyprus) George Taliadoros	Kawasaki	1
64	(Cyprus) Loizos Kallinos	Kawasaki	1
65	(Cyprus) Chrysanthos Charalambous	KTM	1
66	(Cyprus) George Papaloizos	Kawasaki	1
67	(Czech Republic) Petr Michalec	Honda	All
68	(Cyprus) Lambros Tsaggaras	KTM	1
69	(Cyprus) George Mappis	KTM	1
70	(Cyprus) Romario Nikolaides	KTM	1

No	Rider	Constructor	Rounds
71	(Slovakia) Andrej Bilcik	Kawasaki	5
73	(Russia) Dmitry Parshin	Honda	1–3
74	(Estonia) Ardo Kaurit	KTM	3
76	(Austria) Peter Reitbauer	KTM	5, 7
77	(Slovenia) Saso Kragelj	Yamaha	2, 4–5, 7
78	(Czech Republic) Jan Brabec	Kawasaki	5, 7
80	(Italy) Francesco Ombrosi	KTM	2
81	(Ukraine) Valentyn Andriec	KTM	6
83	(Ukraine) Andriy Malaev	KTM	6
84	(Ukraine) Dmytro Dotsenko	KTM	6
87	(Croatia) Nenad Sipek	Yamaha	5, 7
88	(France) Pierrick Roncin	Kawasaki	All
91	(Belarus) Evgeny Tyletski	KTM	6
92	(Greece) Dimitris Kontoletas	Yamaha	1
93	(Netherlands) Stijn Blom	KTM	7
96	(Italy) Alessandro Pagliacci	Honda	4
97	(Slovenia) Dejan Zver	Kawasaki	7
99	(Austria) Patrick Wimmer	Kawasaki	7
100	(Greece) Yiannis Touratzidis	Yamaha	1
101	(Croatia) Marko Leljak	KTM	7
102	(Slovenia) Deni Usaj	Suzuki	7
103	(Greece) Stelios Galatianos	Yamaha	1
104	(Slovakia) Tomas Simko	KTM	5
105	(Slovakia) Martin Kohut	KTM	5
106	(Slovakia) Radek Bohuslav	KTM	5
107	(Hungary) Deczi Balac	Suzuki	7
109	(Ukraine) Andriy Krychfalushiy	Yamaha	6
110	(France) Brice Bonnemoy	Yamaha	8
111	(New Zealand) Joel Doeksen	KTM	1–2, 4–8
112	(Ukraine) Sergeiy Levchenko	Yamaha	6
114	(Estonia) Rannar Uusna	KTM	3
115	(Ukraine) Oleksandr Pashchynskyi	KTM	6
116	(Ukraine) Mykola Pashchynskyi	KTM	5–6
117	(Austria) Stefan Ziegler	KTM	5
119	(France) Charley Ribet	Yamaha	8
120	(Greece) Manolis Skivalos	Honda	1
121	(Italy) Alessandro Valente	Suzuki	4, 7
125	(Finland) Seppo Manninen	Honda	3
126	(Ukraine) Mykola Chen	Yamaha	2, 6
127	(Austria) David Kraus	KTM	7
129	(Czech Republic) Petr Stloukal	Yamaha	7
131	(Estonia) Heido Havam	KTM	1–3
133	(Latvia) Niks Apfelbaums	Honda	3
140	(Slovenia) Erik Slavec	KTM	7
144	(Sweden) Kim Lindstrom	Yamaha	3
147	(Switzerland) Timothy Jaunin	Honda	8
151	(Bulgaria) Nikolay Kumanov	Yamaha	1–2, 4–8
153	(Italy) Marco Maddii	KTM	All
156	(Latvia) Lauris Freibergs	Honda	3
161	(Slovenia) Rok Bekanovic	Yamaha	2

No	Rider	Constructor	Rounds
162	(Austria) Michael Staufer	KTM	1, 3–8
165	(Finland) Juuso Matikainen	Honda	3
166	(Switzerland) Alain Schäfer	Honda	8
168	(Austria) Erwin Schuster	Aprilia	4
169	(Greece) George Iliopoulos	KTM	1
171	(Finland) Marko Kovalainen	Yamaha	1–5, 7–8
172	(Ukraine) Sergeiy Kononov	KTM	6
174	(Czech Republic) Martin Zerava	Honda	1–7
177	(Slovakia) Juraj Popovicz	Honda	5
180	(Ukraine) Andriy Burenko	Yamaha	6
187	(Slovakia) Vit Stransky	KTM	5, 7
193	(Ukraine) Oleksandr Dovgan	Honda	6
197	(France) Morgan Jacquelin	Kawasaki	8
199	(Bulgaria) Nikolay Yovchev	Honda	2
211	(Greece) Dimitris Vagelakos	Yamaha	1
213	(Finland) Antti Pyrhonen	Honda	All
217	(Bulgaria) Georgi Gochev	KTM	2
232	(Czech Republic) Martin Michek	KTM	All
241	(Austria) Philip Rüf	Honda	4
259	(Italy) Mattia Buso	KTM	3–8
262	(Greece) Vassilis Siafarikas	Honda	1
271	(Finland) Samuli Aro	KTM	3
273	(Ukraine) Ruslan Pavluk	Kawasaki	6
277	(Chile) Alejandro Noemi	Honda	3
281	(Ukraine) Yuriy Tsioka	Yamaha	6
300	(Ukraine) Dmytro Asmanov	Kawasaki	6
303	(Finland) Miika Makinen	Honda	3
313	(Ukraine) Mykhaylo Moravskyy	Honda	6
317	(Bulgaria) Todor Totev	Honda	2
321	(Ukraine) Oleg Skrypnikov	Honda	6
331	(Italy) Stefano Barbieri	Suzuki	4
333	(Italy) Nicola Di Luccia	Honda	4
338	(Greece) Panagiotis Kouzis	Husqvarna	1
352	(Austria) Stefan Hauer	KTM	1, 3–8
411	(Slovakia) Richard Szolga	Honda	5
433	(Ukraine) Igor Lubomyrsky	Honda	6
487	(Switzerland) Romain Jacquiot	Yamaha	8
557	(Belgium) Loic Begon	Yamaha	7–8
606	(France) Arnaud Degousee	TM	8
611	(Greece) Nikos Andreou	Yamaha	1
616	(Slovakia) Jakub Hruska	KTM	5
691	(Spain) Adrian Gago	Honda	3–5
717	(France) Dimitry Camus	Yamaha	1–2, 4–5, 7–8
722	(Greece) Spiros Kosmas	KTM	1
764	(Ukraine) Roman Morozov	Kawasaki	2, 6
888	(Italy) Luca Fontanesi	Yamaha	1, 3–5, 7–8
911	(Czech Republic) Tomas Hrdinka	KTM	3, 5
932	(Estonia) Lauri Lehtla	KTM	1–5
942	(Estonia) Juss Laansoo	KTM	1–3
