= Jeffrey Herlings =

Dutch motorcycle racer

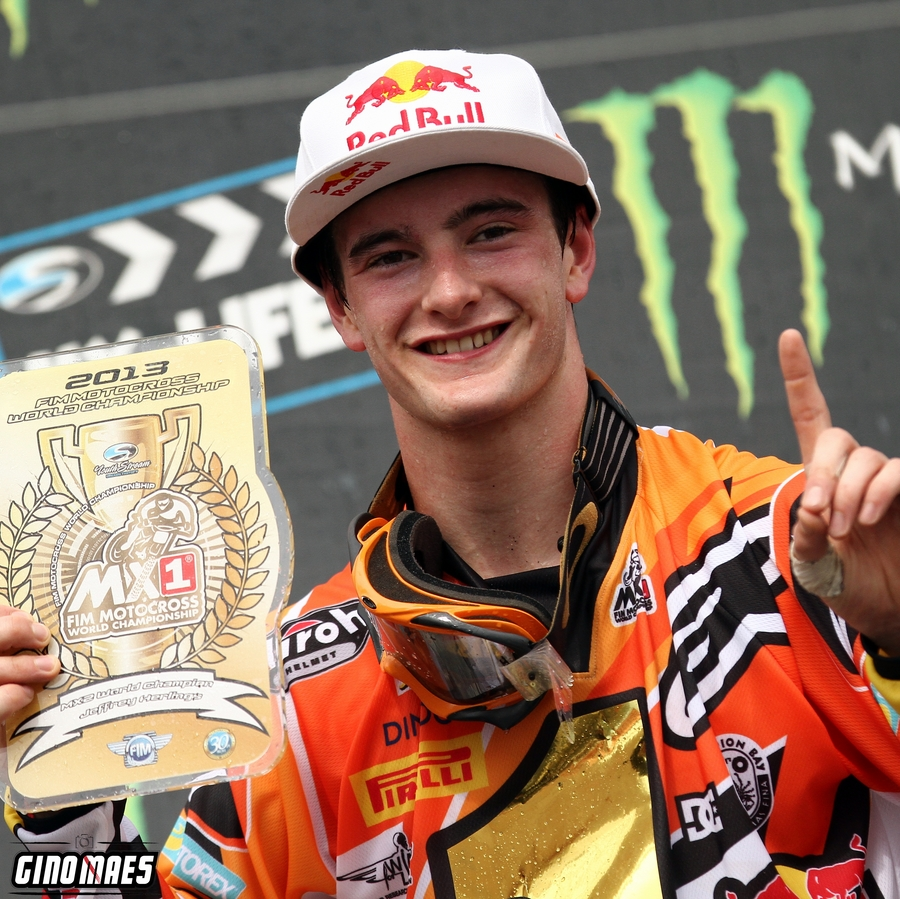
- Jeffrey Herlings in 2013
- Nationality: Dutch
- Born: 12 September 1994 (age 32) Geldrop, Netherlands

Motocross career
- Years active: 2010–present
- Teams: •Red Bull KTM Factory Racing Team (2009–2025); •HRC Honda (2026–present)
- Championships: •2008 FIM 85cc; •2008 EMX 85cc; •2012 MX2; •2013 MX2; •2016 MX2; •2018 MXGP; •2021 MXGP; •2026 MXGP
- Wins: •AMA Motocross 450cc: 1; •MX2: 61; •MXGP: 64; •MXGP Total: 125
- GP debut: 2010, GP of Bulgaria, MX2
- First GP win: 2010, GP of Netherlands, MX2

Jeffrey Herlings (born 12 September 1994) is a Dutch professional motocross racer. He has competed in the Motocross World Championships since 2010. Herlings won the 2012, 2013, and 2016 MX2 Championships; the 2018, 2021 and 2026 MXGP Championships and has the most Grand Prix wins in MXGP history.

== Motocross career ==
=== 2008 ===
In 2008, Herlings won the 85cc FIM Junior Motocross World Championship, & the 85cc European Motocross Championship.

=== 2009 ===
In the 2009 season' Herlings finished second in the 250cc European Motocross Championship and third in the MX2 Dutch Open championship.

=== 2011 ===
Herlings finished second overall behind his Red Bull KTM teammate, Ken Roczen. On the KTM 250 SX-F, he won five overall Grand Prix victories and claimed six individual moto wins across the season.

=== 2016 ===
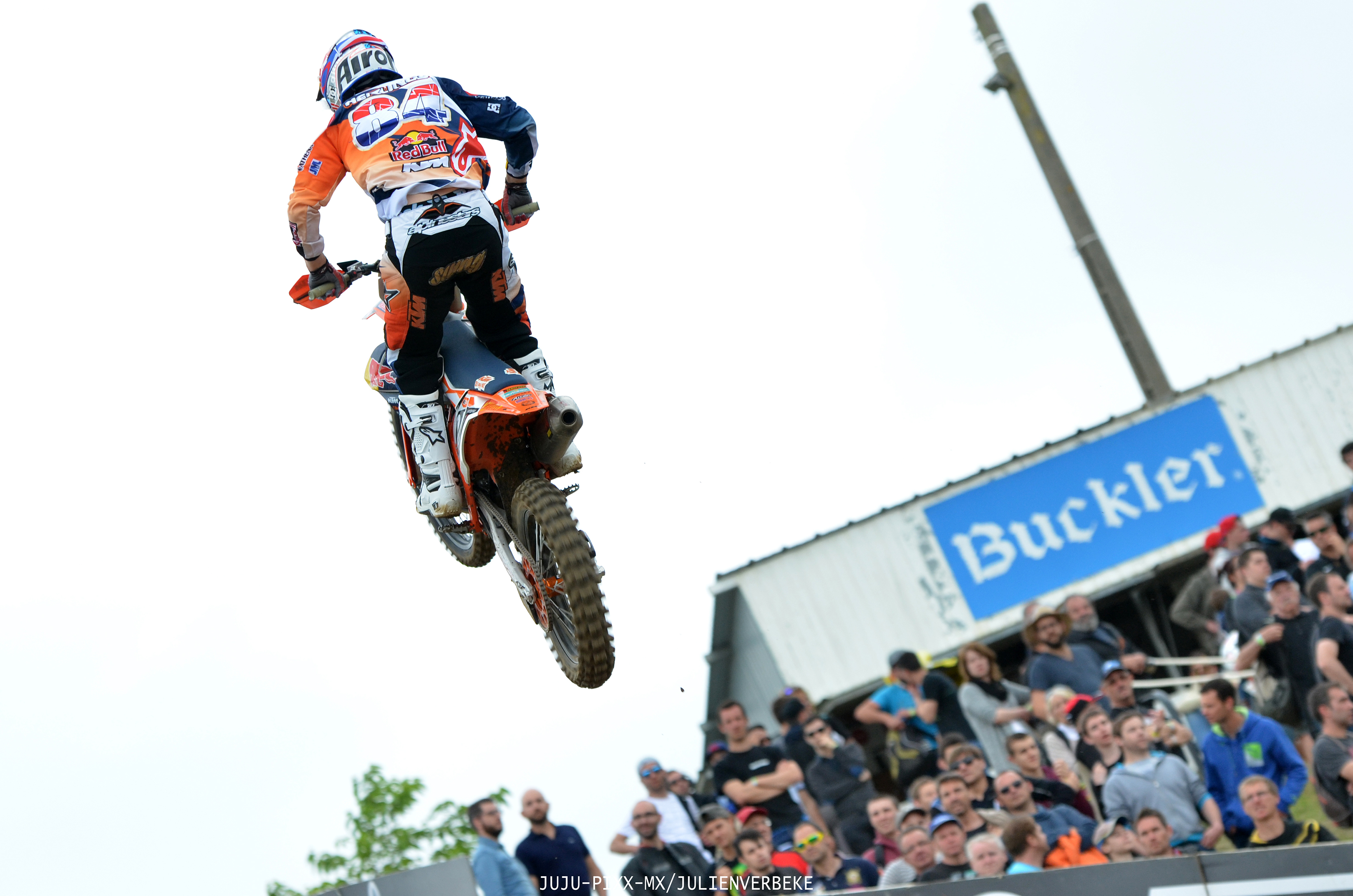
Herlings in 2016

Herlings' final season in MX2 class was in 2016, and he won his third MX2 World Championship title.

=== 2017 ===
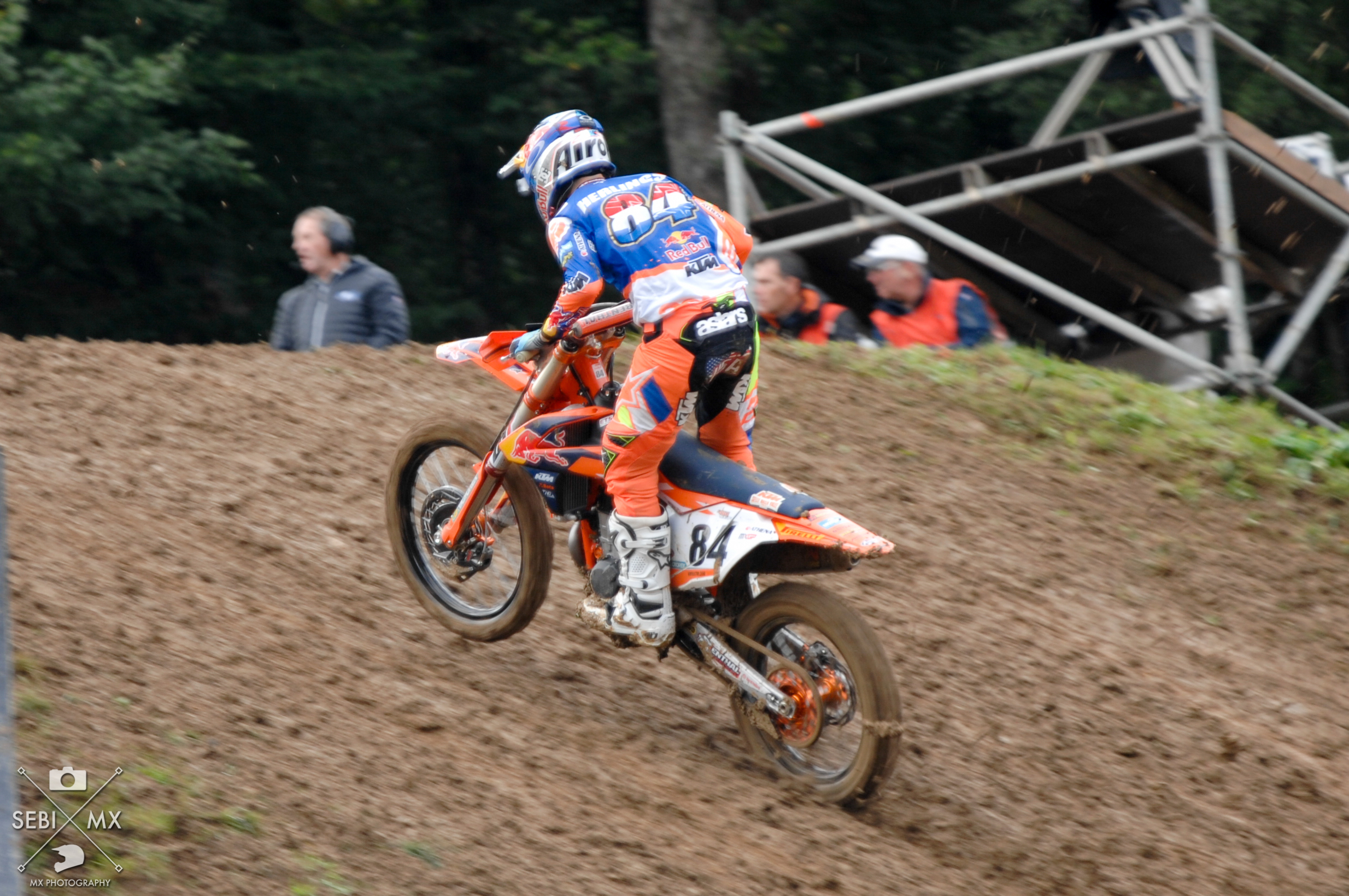
Herlings in 2017

In 2017, Herlings debuted in the MXGP class and finished second overall to Antonio Cairoli in the championship standings. He also raced Round 12 of the AMA Motocross Championship at Ironman and went 1-1.

=== 2018 ===
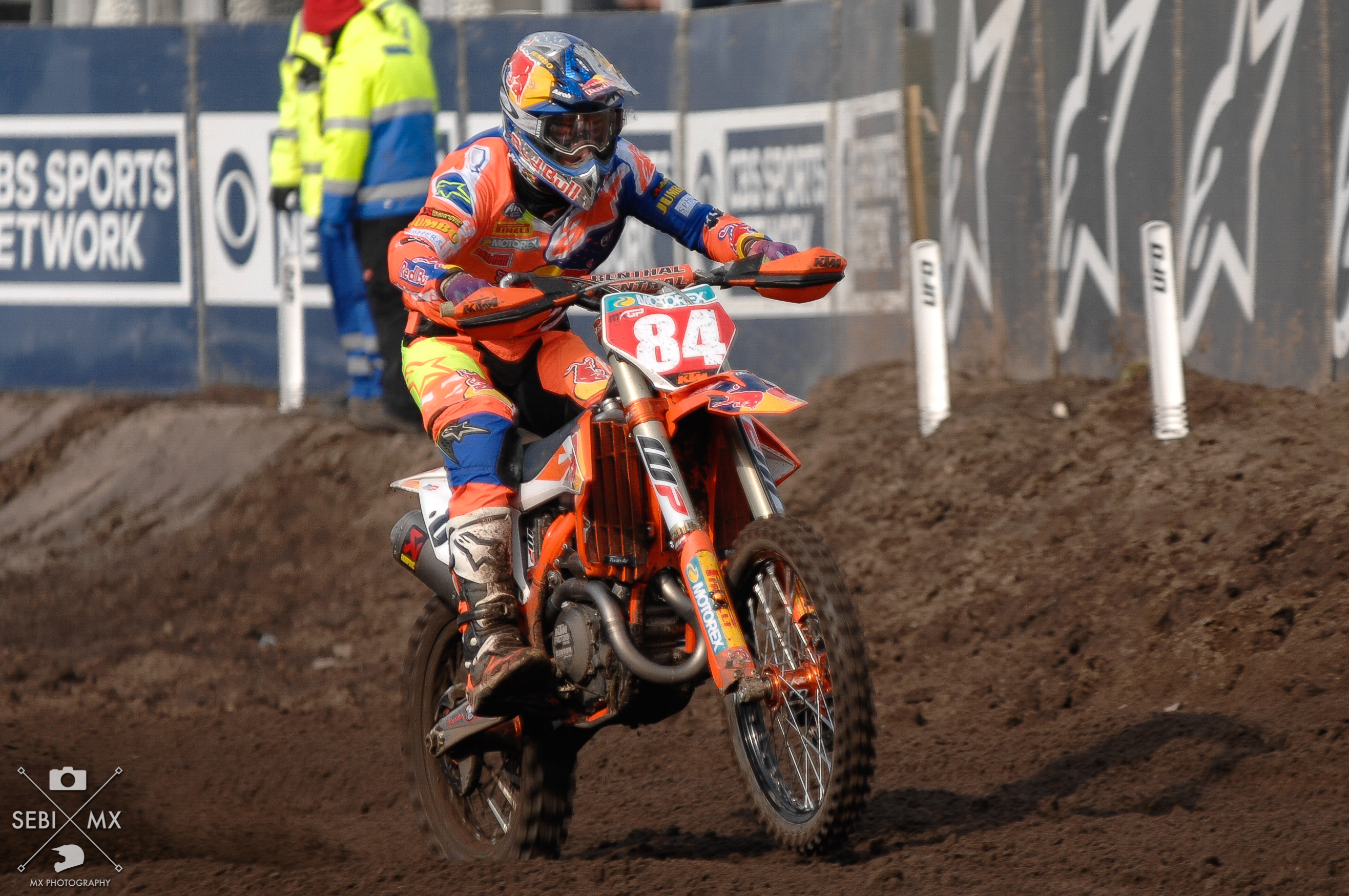
Herlings in 2018

Herlings dominated the MXGP class in 2018, winning 17 out of 20 rounds, the most Grand Prix's any rider has won in a season. He finished the season with 933 points out of a possible 1000.

=== 2019 ===
In 2019, Herlings was unable to defend his title due to injury sustained to his foot in January of that year. He missed the first seven rounds but during moto 2 at round 9 in Latvia, he broke his right ankle after a rider rode over it from a crash, during a sighting lap. He returned for the final three rounds where he finished 12th, 1st & 1st.

Later in the year, Herlings was a member of the winning Dutch team at the 2019 Motocross des Nations event that included Glenn Coldenhoff and Calvin Vlaanderen. Their victory was the first Dutch win in the 73-year history of the Motocross des Nations.

=== 2020 ===
During the 2020 FIM Motocross World Championship, Herlings won four of the first six rounds. At round 6 in Citta di Faenza, he crashed during practice and was virtually paralyzed for about 30 minutes before regaining control of his body. In October, Herlings decided to end the season, to recover from his fall in Italy as well as a previous foot injury.

=== 2021 ===
Herlings missed the Czech Grand Prix due to injury, but then secured nine Grand Prix victories and 15 race wins, and achieving 14 podium finishes over the season. Herlings and Romain Febvre were separated by a mere three points heading into the final round in Mantova, Italy, but Herlings won both motos to clinch his second MXGP World Championship title by a narrow five-point margin over Febvre. This was his fifth Motocross World Championship overall and his 99th career Grand Prix win. During the season he led 157 laps and securing 13 pole positions.

=== 2022 ===
Herlings sat out the entirety of 2022 after suffering a foot injury. He also considered racing the AMA Pro Motocross Championship but opted against it, in order to allow previous injuries to recover fully.

=== 2023 ===
At round 5 in Águeda, Portugal, Herlings gained his 101st Grand Prix victory which put him on par with 10-time champion Stefan Everts. The following round at Intu Xanadu, Spain; Herlings broke Stefan Everts record of 101 Grand Prix wins by winning his 102nd. During MXGP race 1 at round 9 in Germany, Herlings crashed and fractured his C5 vertebrae while battling for the lead. This put an end to his championship aspirations for 2023. During practice at round 16 in Arnhem, Netherlands. Herlings fell and suffered a collarbone fracture.

=== 2024 ===
For the first time since 2017, Herlings competed in every round and race of the MXGP World Championship. Herlings struggled through the first five rounds, finishing on the podium once. From round 5 to 20, Herlings finished on the podium 14 times, winning at rounds 9, 12, 14 & 16. Herlings placed a distant third in the World Championship standings for 2024.

Herlings also captured the 2024 MX1 British and Dutch Motocross Championships.

=== 2025 ===
Herlings entered the 2025 MXGP season recovering from an off-season surgery on his right knee, having missed the early rounds of the championship. He delayed starting his season debut until Round 4 in Sardinia.

Herlings won his first GP of the season in Teutschenthal (Germany) where he posted a 2–1 moto result, his 108th career MXGP win. He also won the MXGP of Latvia with a 1–1 moto sweep. In Turkey (Afyon), he secured another overall victory with a 2–1 moto score.

Herlings missed Round 13 (Finland) due to a broken collarbone. In China, he won both motos (1–1) to claim another GP victory. He recorded multiple Q-Heat wins, which contributed extra points in some rounds.

By the end of the season, Herlings finished fifth overall in the standings, accumulating 608 points.

=== 2026 ===
For the 2026 season, Herlings made a major change in his career by joining Honda HRC after spending his entire Grand Prix career with KTM. He quickly adapted to the Honda, winning the opening round in Argentina with a 1-1. After several technical problems during the first half of the season, he was 68 points behind in the championship. His season turned around at the British Grand Prix, capitalising on the misfortune of championship leader Lucas Coenen, then began a remarkable run of eight consecutive Grand Prix victories. Herlings went on to secure his sixth Motocross World Championship, and third MXGP title, at the Grand Prix of Türkiye with two rounds remaining.

He ended the season with 13 Grand Prix victories, 22 race and nine qualifying race wins, on 973 points and taking his career total to 125 Grand Prix victories.

== MXGP results ==
Year	Rnd 1	Rnd 2	Rnd 3	Rnd 4	Rnd 5	Rnd 6	Rnd 7	Rnd 8	Rnd 9	Rnd 10	Rnd 11	Rnd 12	Rnd 13	Rnd 14	Rnd 15	Rnd 16	Rnd 17	Rnd 18	Rnd 19	Rnd 20	Average Finish	Podium Percent	Place
2010 MX2	4	3	1	2	12	14	5	13	1	2	2	11	OUT	OUT	OUT	-	-	-	-	-	5.83	50%	6th
2011 MX2	3	1	2	1	4	1	4	2	4	2	1	2	4	3	1	-	-	-	-	-	2.33	73%	2nd
2012 MX2	1	2	1	1	7	1	1	2	2	7	1	1	2	1	1	8	-	-	-	-	2.43	81%	1st
2013 MX2	1	1	1	1	1	1	1	1	1	1	1	1	1	1	1	OUT	OUT	1	-	-	1.00	100%	1st
2014 MX2	1	1	OUT	1	1	1	1	1	1	1	1	1	1	OUT	OUT	OUT	11	-	-	-	1.76	92%	2nd
2015 MX2	1	1	7	2	1	2	2	1	2	29	7	OUT	OUT	OUT	OUT	OUT	OUT	OUT	-	-	5.00	73%	7th
2016 MX2	1	1	1	1	1	1	1	1	1	1	1	1	1	OUT	OUT	OUT	1	2	1	-	1.06	100%	1st
2017 MXGP	15	17	9	12	8	2	1	2	7	2	2	2	4	1	1	10	1	1	1	-	5.15	58%	2nd
2018 MXGP	1	1	2	1	1	2	1	1	1	1	OUT	1	1	1	1	1	1	1	1	1	1.10	100%	1st
2019 MXGP	OUT	OUT	OUT	OUT	OUT	OUT	OUT	4	6	OUT	OUT	OUT	OUT	OUT	OUT	12	1	1	-	-	4.88	40%	19th
2020 MXGP	1	1	5	3	1	1	OUT	OUT	OUT	OUT	OUT	OUT	OUT	OUT	OUT	OUT	OUT	OUT	-	-	2.00	83%	12th
2021 MXGP	2	3	1	9	OUT	2	3	1	1	1	2	1	1	1	11	4	1	1	-	-	2.64	82%	1st
2022 MXGP	OUT	OUT	OUT	OUT	OUT	OUT	OUT	OUT	OUT	OUT	OUT	OUT	OUT	OUT	OUT	OUT	OUT	OUT	-	-	OUT	OUT	OUT
2023 MXGP	2	1	4	3	1	1	9	1	DNF	OUT	OUT	OUT	OUT	5	4	OUT	OUT	OUT	OUT	-	3.10	60%	8th
2024 MXGP	8	4	3	6	9	2	3	3	1	2	2	1	3	1	3	1	2	6	3	3	3.45	75%	3rd
2025 MXGP	OUT	OUT	OUT	15	9	7	9	6	4	1	1	5	OUT	OUT	8	2	1	1	1	2	4.80	47%	5th
2026 MXGP	1 ARG	2 AND	10 SUI	2 SAR	1 TRE	1 FRA	9 GER	10 LAT	1 ITA	1 POR	2 RSA	1 GBR	1 CZE	1 FLA	1 SWE	1 NED	1 TUR	1 CHN	1 AUS	-	2.52	84%	1st

== Achievements ==
- 2002 Dutch Champion 65cc Amateur federation
- 2002 Czech Champion 65cc
- 2003 Dutch Champion 65cc Amateur federation
- 2004 Dutch Champion 65cc KNMV
- 2004 3rd European Championship 65cc
- 2005 Dutch Champion 85cc Small wheels KNMV
- 2006 4th Dutch Open Championship 85cc Big Wheels
- 2006 2nd International Youth weekend at Heerde
- 2007 2nd Dutch Championship 85cc Big Wheels
- 2007 4th European Championship 85cc Big Wheels
- 2007 6th World Championship 85cc Big Wheels
- 2008 Dutch Champion 85cc
- 2008 European Champion 85cc
- 2008 World Champion 85cc
- 2008 German Champion 85cc
- 2009 2nd European Championship MX2
- 2009 3rd Dutch Open Championship MX2
- 2010 6th World Championship MX2 (2 GP wins, 6 podiums)
- 2010 2nd Dutch Open Championship MX2
- 2011 2nd World Championship MX2 (5 GP wins, 11 podiums)
- 2011 Dutch Open Champion MX2
- 2012 World Champion MX2 (9 GP wins, 13 podiums)
- 2012 Dutch Open Champion MX2
- 2013 World Champion MX2 (15 GP wins, 15 podiums)
- 2013 Dutch Open Champion MX2
- 2014 2nd World Championship MX2 (12 GP wins, 12 podiums)
- 2014 4th Dutch Open Championship MX2
- 2015 7th World Championship MX2 (4 GP wins, 8 podiums)
- 2016 Dutch Masters Champion MX2
- 2016 World Champion MX2 (14 GP wins, 15 podiums)
- 2017 Dutch Masters Champion MX1
- 2017 2nd World Championship MXGP (6 GP wins, 11 podiums)
- 2017 AMA Motocross Championship 450 class (2 races, 2 wins)
- 2018 Dutch Masters Champion MX1
- 2018 World Champion MXGP (17 GP wins, 19 podiums)
- 2019 19th World Championship MXGP (2 GP wins, 2 podiums)
- 2019 MxoN Champions Team Netherlands
- 2021 World Champion MXGP (9 GP wins, 14 Podiums)
- 2023 8th World Championship MXGP (4 GP wins, 6 podiums)
- 2023 Dutch Masters Champion MX1
- 2024 Dutch Masters Champion MX1
- 2024 MX1 British Motocross Champion
- 2024 3rd World Championship MXGP (4 GP wins, 15 podiums)
- 2025 5th World Championship MXGP (5 GP wins, 7 podiums)
- 2026 Dutch Masters Champion MX1
- 2026 6th World Championship MXGP (13 GP wins, 16 Podiums)
- 2026 Acerbis Best Lap Competition Award MXGP

== Personal life ==
On 13 January 2019, Herlings was dubbed a Knight in the Order of Orange-Nassau at the KNMV Motorsports Gala.
