= Julien Bill =

Swiss motorcycle racer

- Nationality: Swiss
- Born: 2 May 1983 (age 42) Geneva, Switzerland

Motocross career
- Years active: 2001 - 2011
- Teams: Suzuki, Yamaha, Honda, Aprilia
- Championships: 1
- Wins: 8

Julien Bill (born 2 May 1983) is a former Swiss professional motocross rider, world champion in MX3 class in 2011.
