= 2012 Motocross des Nations =

Motocross race held in Lommel, Belgium

Seasons
- ← 2011 2013 →

The 2012 Motocross des Nations was a motocross race held on 29 September and 30 September 2012 in Lommel, Belgium.

== Preview ==
For the first time in the last few years it looked as though the deep and energy-sapping sands of Lommel may offer up a chance for the European teams to un-seat the United States and end their 7-year winning streak. The Americans entered as reigning champions, but had three riders who had never experienced this sort of sand before. 2012 AMA MX1 Champion, Ryan Dungey led the charge and had been rarely beaten throughout the American season. Blake Baggett, 2012 AMA MX2 champion and Justin Barcia had shown great speed throughout the season, whilst battling each other for the American MX2 crown.

The home team Belgium had three riders who were looking in great form, and most importantly for this event, consistent. Clement Desalle had had an injury free season and was the only real challenger to Tony Cairoli throughout the GP season. The same could be said of MX2 rider Jeremy van Horebeek, who finished in third place in the MX2 Grand Prix and was in his last year riding a 250cc machine before moving up to the MX1 class for 2013. The final member of the team Ken de Dycker had been picked up by KTM in 2012 to stand in for the injured Max Nagl, he stayed with the manufacturer once Nagl had returned and had played second fiddle to his world champion teammate Tony Cairoli throughout much of the season, when it looked as though he had the speed to beat him.

Cairoli himself had won yet another world title, mostly un-opposed, and led the Italian team which contained, Husqvarna factory rider and mid-pack MX2 runner Alessandro Lupino and Marchetti KTM MX1 racer Davide Guarneri. Neither could be described as sand riders though.

The MX2 world champion Jeffrey Herlings had an outside chance of taking to the top-step of the podium, but would have to carry potentially bad results from British Championship MX1 rider Marc de Reuver and fellow MX2 grand prix star Glenn Coldenhoff.

Germany fielded its strongest team in several years. Max Nagl, who had missed most of the season due to injury, returned for the final rounds. Ken Roczen had come back from a tough debut year in the United States, but had been picking up form and Markus Schiffer was capable of top 10 MX1 grand prix pace.

Last year's runners up France had a team that was viewed as favorites on paper but struggled in the deep sand on the course, the same could be said for Great Britain.

Australia finished third in 2011, but where stricken by injuries to both Chad Reed and Brett Metcalfe, along with MX2 GP runner Dean Ferris. This years team consisted wholly of Australian Championship riders, and no-one knew how they would cope.

Injuries were a problem for many other teams. South Africa weren't expected to do as well as last year as they'd lost both Tyla Rattray and Gareth Swanepoel. Spain had lost number 1 rider Jonathan Barragan, Japan had lost both Yoshitaka Atsuta and Akira Narita, Finland legend Antti Pyrhonen had retired and Austria had lost both Pascal Raucheneker and Gunter Schmidiger.

For New Zealand legend and former MX1 world championship runner up Joshua Coppins this would be his last professional event before retirement.

Mongolia were scheduled to return to the MXDN but canceled at the last minute because of logistical reasons. An under-strength Brazil side were flown out to replace them but it was a team without any of its countries top 5 riders.

== Entry list ==
The entry list is taken from the official Motocross World Championship website.

	Country	Nr	Rider	Class	Motorcycle
1	United States	1	Ryan Dungey	MX1	KTM 450
1	United States	2	Blake Baggett	MX2	Kawasaki 250
1	United States	3	Justin Barcia	Open	Honda 450
2	France	4	Gautier Paulin	MX1	Kawasaki 450
2	France	5	Marvin Musquin	MX2	KTM 250
2	France	6	Xavier Boog	Open	Kawasaki 450
3	Australia	7	Lawson Bopping	MX1	Yamaha 450
3	Australia	8	Luke Styke	MX2	Yamaha 250
3	Australia	9	Todd Waters	Open	Suzuki 450
4	United Kingdom	10	Tommy Searle	MX1	Kawasaki 450
4	United Kingdom	11	Jake Nicholls	MX2	KTM 250
4	United Kingdom	12	Max Anstie	Open	Honda 250
5	Belgium	13	Clement Desalle	MX1	Suzuki 450
5	Belgium	14	Jeremy Van Horebeek	MX2	KTM 250
5	Belgium	15	Ken De Dycker	Open	KTM 450
6	South Africa	16	Richard van der Westhuizen	MX1	Yamaha 450
6	South Africa	17	Shannon Terreblance	MX2	Kawasaki 250
6	South Africa	18	Neville Bradshaw	Open	Honda 450
7	Germany	19	Maximilian Nagl	MX1	KTM 450
7	Germany	20	Ken Roczen	MX2	KTM 250
7	Germany	21	Marcus Schiffer	Open	Suzuki 450
8	Spain	22	Joan Cros	MX1	Suzuki 450
8	Spain	23	José Butrón	MX2	KTM 250
8	Spain	24	Alvaro Lozano	Open	Honda 450
9	Netherlands	25	Marc de Reuver	MX1	Kawasaki 450
9	Netherlands	26	Glenn Coldenhoff	MX2	KTM 250
9	Netherlands	27	Jeffrey Herlings	Open	KTM 250
10	Estonia	28	Gert Krestinov	MX1	Honda 450
10	Estonia	29	Priit Rätsep	MX2	KTM 250
10	Estonia	30	Tanel Leok	Open	Suzuki 450
11	Portugal	31	Rui Gonçalves	MX1	Honda 450
11	Portugal	32	Paulo Alberto	MX2	Honda 250
11	Portugal	33	Luis Correia	Open	Yamaha 450
12	Switzerland	34	Arnaud Tonus	MX1	Yamaha 450
12	Switzerland	35	Jeremy Seewer	MX2	Suzuki 250
12	Switzerland	36	Valentin Guillod	Open	KTM 250
13	Japan	37	Makoto Ogata	MX1	Honda 450
13	Japan	38	Junya Takenaka	MX2	Kawasaki 250
13	Japan	39	Yohei Kojima	Open	Suzuki 450
14	Czech Republic	40	Filip Neugebauer	MX1	Kawasaki 450
14	Czech Republic	41	Milan Spicak	MX2	Kawasaki 250
14	Czech Republic	42	Martin Michek	Open	KTM 450
15	Russia	43	Evgeny Bobryshev	MX1	Honda 450
15	Russia	44	Aleksandr Tonkov	MX2	Honda 250
15	Russia	45	Evgeny Mikhaylov	Open	Suzuki 450
16	Italy	46	Tony Cairoli	MX1	KTM 450
16	Italy	47	Alessandro Lupino	MX2	Husqvarna 250
16	Italy	48	Davide Guarneri	Open	KTM 450
17	Finland	49	Ludvig Söderberg	MX1	Honda 450
17	Finland	50	Teemu Lehtinen	MX2	Kawasaki 250
17	Finland	51	Niko Koskela	Open	Kawasaki 450
18	Denmark	52	Nicolai Hansen	MX1	Suzuki 450
18	Denmark	53	Stefan Kjer Olsen	MX2	Suzuki 250
18	Denmark	54	Kasper Lynggaard	Open	Kawasaki 450
19	(Republic of Ireland) Ireland	55	Martin Barr	MX1	Suzuki 450
19	(Republic of Ireland) Ireland	56	Graeme Irwin	MX2	Yamaha 250
19	(Republic of Ireland) Ireland	57	Stuart Edmonds	Open	Suzuki 250
20	Austria	58	Marco Schögler	MX1	KTM 450
20	Austria	59	Lukas Neurauter	MX2	KTM 250
20	Austria	60	Mattias Walkner	Open	KTM 450
21	Sweden	61	Kim Lindström	MX1	Kawasaki 450
21	Sweden	62	Karl Olsson	MX2	Honda 250
21	Sweden	63	Filip Bengtsson	Open	KTM 250
22	Latvia	64	Davis Ivanovs	MX1	Kawasaki 450
22	Latvia	65	Roberts Justs	MX2	Honda 250
22	Latvia	66	Lauris Freibergs	Open	Honda 450
23	Slovenia	67	Matevz Irt	MX1	Suzuki 450
23	Slovenia	68	Tim Gajser	MX2	KTM 250
23	Slovenia	69	Klemen Gercar	Open	Honda 450
24	Puerto Rico	70	Gino Aponte	MX1	Yamaha 450
24	Puerto Rico	71	Zach Osborne	MX2	Yamaha 250
24	Puerto Rico	72	Kyle Chisholm	Open	Kawasaki 450
25	Venezuela	73	Carlos Badiali	MX1	Yamaha 450
25	Venezuela	74	Hector Rodriguez	MX2	Yamaha 250
25	Venezuela	75	Humberto Martin	Open	Honda 450
26	Norway	76	Kim Oiva Jarva	MX1	Honda 450
26	Norway	77	Even Heibye	MX2	KTM 250
26	Norway	78	Magne Klingsheim	Open	KTM 250
27	Brazil	79	Gabriel Gentil	MX1	Yamaha 450
27	Brazil	80	Rafael Silva Faria	MX2	Yamaha 250
27	Brazil	81	Marcal Müller	Open	Yamaha 450
28	New Zealand	85	Joshua Coppins	MX1	Yamaha 450
28	New Zealand	86	Kayne Lamont	MX2	KTM 250
28	New Zealand	87	Cody Cooper	Open	Suzuki 450
29	Lithuania	91	Nerijus Rukstela	MX1	Suzuki 450
29	Lithuania	92	Matas Inda	MX2	Kawasaki 250
29	Lithuania	93	Vytautas Bucas	Open	Honda 450
30	Iceland	94	Viktor Gudbergsson	MX1	Kawasaki 450
30	Iceland	95	Ingvi Bjorn Birgirsson	MX2	KTM 250
30	Iceland	96	Solvi Borgar Sveinsson	Open	Honda 450
31	Greece	97	Panagiotis Kouzis	MX1	Honda 450
31	Greece	98	Dimitris Kotoletas	MX2	Yamaha 250
31	Greece	99	George Lliopoulos	Open	KTM 450
32	Thailand	100	Kritsada Boonatee	MX1	Honda 450
32	Thailand	101	Trakarn Thangthong	MX2	Yamaha 250
32	Thailand	102	Chaiyan Romphan	Open	Yamaha 450
33	Hungary	124	Mark Szoke	MX1	Kawasaki 450
33	Hungary	125	Erik Hugyecz	MX2	Yamaha 250
33	Hungary	126	Kornel Nemeth	Open	KTM 450
34	Mongolia	127	Erdenibileg Khaliunbold	MX1	
34	Mongolia	128	E Munkhbolor	MX2	
34	Mongolia	129	Purevdorj Murun	Open	

Note 1: Mongolia did not participate.

== Qualifying ==
=== Qualified Countries ===
Pos	Country	Points
1	Germany	3
2	Belgium	4
3	Italy	6
4	Netherlands	7
5	France	8
6	(United Kingdom) Great Britain	9
7	United States	9
8	Estonia	12
9	Russia	12
10	Australia	14
11	Portugal	17
12	Denmark	23
13	Sweden	25
14	(Republic of Ireland) Ireland	25
15	Finland	26
16	Latvia	27
17	Switzerland	28
18	Norway	29
19	Slovenia	30

=== Countries admitted to the B Final ===
Pos	Country	Points
20	New Zealand	31
21	Czech Republic	32
22	Spain	33
23	Austria	38
24	Puerto Rico	41
25	Japan	43
26	Brazil	43
27	South Africa	44
28	Lithuania	47
29	Iceland	51
30	Greece	53
31	Venezuela	54
32	Hungary	60

=== Non-Qualified Countries ===
Pos	Country	Points
33	Thailand	61

== B Final ==
Pos	Country	Points
1	(New Zealand) New Zealand^{1}	3
2	Czech Republic	12
3	Lithuania	23
4	Puerto Rico	23
5	Austria	24
6	Spain	25
7	Japan	26
8	South Africa	26
9	Hungary	30
10	Venezuela	31
11	Iceland	40
12	Greece	49
13	Brazil	52

Note 1: New Zealand won the B final which meant they qualified for the main races.

=== Race ===
Pos	Country	Riders	Race 1	Race 2	Race 3	Points
1	Germany	Maximilian Nagl	3		6	25
1	Germany	Ken Roczen	5	4		25
1	Germany	Marcus Schiffer		7	(14)	25
2	Belgium	Clement Desalle	4		7	29
2	Belgium	Jeremy van Horebeek	10	(38)		29
2	Belgium	Ken De Dycker		3	5	29
3	United States	Ryan Dungey	7		9	39
3	United States	Blake Baggett	(14)	6		39
3	United States	Justin Barcia		14	3	39
4	Netherlands	Marc De Reuver	9		17	44
4	Netherlands	Glenn Coldenhoff	15	(39)		44
4	Netherlands	Jeffrey Herlings		1	2	44
5	Italy	Tony Cairoli	1		1	45
5	Italy	Alessandro Lupino	(37)	25		45
5	Italy	Davide Guarneri		5	13	45
6	France	Gautier Paulin	2		8	47
6	France	Marvin Musquin	(19)	11		47
6	France	Xavier Boog		10	16	47
7	Estonia	Gert Krestinov	17		18	56
7	Estonia	Priit Rätsep	(20)	15		56
7	Estonia	Tanel Leok		2	4	56
8	(United Kingdom) Great Britain	Tommy Searle	8		12	56
8	(United Kingdom) Great Britain	Jake Nicholls	16	(36)		56
8	(United Kingdom) Great Britain	Max Anstie		9	11	56
9	Portugal	Rui Goncalves	12		10	80
9	Portugal	Paulo Alberto	(33)	21		80
9	Portugal	Luis Correia		13	24	80
10	Australia	Lawson Bopping	21		19	83
10	Australia	Luke Styke	(26)	20		83
10	Australia	Todd Waters		8	15	83
11	Russia	Evgeny Bobryshev	6		(33)	93
11	Russia	Aleksandr Tonkov	18	12		93
11	Russia	Evgeny Mikhaylov		31	26	93
12	Sweden	Kim Lindstrom	24		23	103
12	Sweden	Karl Olsson	(32)	18		103
12	Sweden	Filip Bengtsson		16	22	103
13	(Republic of Ireland) Ireland	Martin Barr	13		21	106
13	(Republic of Ireland) Ireland	Graeme Irwin	23	22		106
13	(Republic of Ireland) Ireland	Stuart Edmonds		27	(30)	106
14	Latvia	Davis Ivanovs	(28)		28	120
14	Latvia	Roberts Justs	22	24		120
14	Latvia	Lauris Freibergs		26	20	120
15	New Zealand	Joshua Coppins	11		34	127
15	New Zealand	Kayne Lamont	(34)	33		127
15	New Zealand	Cody Cooper		17	32	127
16	Slovenia	134				
17	Norway	151				
18	Denmark	119				
19	Switzerland	129				
20	Finland	97				

Note 1: Denmark and Switzerland both lost one rider through injury and Finland lost two, their scores are placed differently from the rest of the field who lost no riders.
