= 2016 Motocross des Nations =

Motocross race

Seasons
- ← 2015 2017 →

The 2016 Motocross des Nations is a motocross race to be held on 24 September and 25 September 2016 in Maggiora, Italy.

== Preview ==
The Motocross des Nations travels to Italy this year for the first time since 2009 and will visit the Maggiora track for the first time since 1986.

France are the defending champions having won their third title, on home soil in 2015. The French Motorcycle Federation were the first to announce their team for this years event with Romain Febvre, Dylan Ferrandis and Gautier Paulin being chosen to represent their country. A few weeks later, Ferrandis broke his arm at the MXGP of Switzerland. His position in the squad will be taken by reserve Benoît Paturel.

Australia were the next to be announced, with Motorcycling Australia putting up a team of domestic championship based riders.

Team USA put forward a squad that lacked some of their fastest riders. Ryan Dungey ruled himself out because of injury problems and Eli Tomac decided not to compete. As a result of injury, Jeremy Martin also ruled himself out. This left a squad of Cooper Webb, Alex Martin and Jason Anderson.

== Entry list ==
Start numbers are allocated based on the team finish from the previous year's edition. France are the reigning champions so they start with numbers 1, 2 and 3.

	Country	Nr	Rider	Class	Motorcycle
1	France	1	Romain Febvre	MXGP	Yamaha 450
1	France	2	Benoît Paturel	MX2	Yamaha 250
1	France	3	Gautier Paulin	Open	Honda 450
2	United States	4	Cooper Webb	MXGP	Yamaha 450
2	United States	5	Alex Martin	MX2	Yamaha 250
2	United States	6	Jason Anderson	Open	Husqvarna 450
3	Belgium	7	Kevin Strijbos	MXGP	Suzuki 450
3	Belgium	8	Jeremy van Horebeek	MX2	Yamaha 250
3	Belgium	9	Brent Van Doninck	Open	Yamaha 450
4	Estonia	10	Priit Rätsep	MXGP	Honda 450
4	Estonia	11	Harri Kullas	MX2	KTM 250
4	Estonia	12	Tanel Leok	Open	Husqvarna 450
5	Switzerland	13	Valentin Guillod	MXGP	Yamaha 450
5	Switzerland	14	Jeremy Seewer	MX2	Suzuki 250
5	Switzerland	15	Arnaud Tonus	Open	Kawasaki 250
6	Netherlands	16	Glenn Coldenhoff	MXGP	KTM 450
6	Netherlands	17	Brian Bogers	MX2	KTM 250
6	Netherlands	18	Jeffrey Herlings	Open	KTM 450
7	Australia	19	Todd Waters	MXGP	Suzuki 450
7	Australia	20	Mitchell Evans	MX2	Yamaha 250
7	Australia	21	Dean Ferris	Open	Yamaha 250
8	New Zealand	22	Cody Cooper	MXGP	Honda 450
8	New Zealand	23	Josiah Natzke	MX2	KTM 250
8	New Zealand	24	Hamish Harwood	Open	KTM 450
9	Germany	25	Max Nagl	MXGP	Husqvarna 450
9	Germany	26	Henry Jacobi	MX2	KTM 250
9	Germany	27	Dennis Ullrich	Open	KTM 450
10	Austria	28	Lukas Neurauter	MXGP	KTM 450
10	Austria	29	Michael Sandner	MX2	KTM 250
10	Austria	30	Pascal Rauchenecker	Open	Husqvarna 250
11	Spain	31	José Butrón	MXGP	KTM 450
11	Spain	32	Jorge Prado	MX2	KTM 250
11	Spain	33	Jorge Zaragoza	Open	Honda
12	Russia	34	Semen Rogozin	MXGP	Husqvarna 450
12	Russia	35	Vsevolod Brylyakov	MX2	Kawasaki 250
12	Russia	36	Evgeny Bobryshev	Open	Honda 450
13	Sweden	37	Anton Gole	MXGP	Husqvarna 450
13	Sweden	38	Alvin Östlund	MX2	Yamaha 250
13	Sweden	39	Fredrik Noren	Open	Honda 450
14	Italy	40	Tony Cairoli	MXGP	KTM 450
14	Italy	41	Samuele Bernardini	MX2	TM 250
14	Italy	42	Michele Cervellin	Open	Honda 250
15	Denmark	43	Nikolaj Larsen	MXGP	KTM 450
15	Denmark	44	Thomas Kjer Olsen	MX2	Husqvarna 250
15	Denmark	45	Glen Meier	Open	KTM 250
16	Portugal	46	Rui Gonçalves	MXGP	Husqvarna 450
16	Portugal	47	Hugo Basaula	MX2	Kawasaki 250
16	Portugal	48	Paulo Alberto	Open	Honda 450
17	(Republic of Ireland) Ireland	49	Graeme Irwin	MXGP	Honda 450
17	(Republic of Ireland) Ireland	50	Martin Barr	MX2	Honda 250
17	(Republic of Ireland) Ireland	51	Stuart Edmonds	Open	TM 450
18	(United Kingdom) Great Britain	52	Tommy Searle	MXGP	Kawasaki 450
18	(United Kingdom) Great Britain	53	Max Anstie	MX2	Husqvarna 250
18	(United Kingdom) Great Britain	54	Shaun Simpson	Open	KTM 450
19	Latvia	55	Davis Ivanovs	MXGP	Yamaha 450
19	Latvia	56	Karlis Sabulis	MX2	Yamaha 250
19	Latvia	57	Toms Macuks	Open	Kawasaki 450
20	Japan	58	Akira Narita	MXGP	Honda 450
20	Japan	59	Chihiro Notsuka	MX2	Honda 250
20	Japan	60	Kei Yamamoto	Open	Honda 450
21	Slovenia	61	Tim Gajser	MXGP	Honda 450
21	Slovenia	62	Jan Pancar	MX2	Yamaha 250
21	Slovenia	63	Jernej Irt	Open	Yamaha 450
22	Czech Republic	64	Jaromir Romancik	MXGP	Suzuki 450
22	Czech Republic	65	Filip Neugebauer	MX2	Kawasaki 250
22	Czech Republic	66	Petr Smitka	Open	KTM 450
23	Poland	70	Lukasz Lonka	MXGP	KTM 450
23	Poland	71	Szymon Staszkiewicz	MX2	KTM 250
23	Poland	72	Tomasz Wysocki	Open	KTM 450
24	Lithuania	73	Vytautas Bucas	MXGP	Yamaha 450
24	Lithuania	74	Dovydas Karka	MX2	KTM 250
24	Lithuania	75	Arminas Jasikonis	Open	Suzuki 450
25	Slovakia	76	Tomáš Šimko	MXGP	Honda 450
25	Slovakia	77	Richard Šikyňa	MX2	KTM 250
25	Slovakia	78	Tomáš Kohút	Open	KTM 250
26	Brazil	79	Fabio Dos Santos	MXGP	Yamaha 450
26	Brazil	80	Ramyller Alves	MX2	Yamaha 250
26	Brazil	81	Jean Ramos	Open	Yamaha 450
27	Finland	82	Valterri Malin	MXGP	KTM 450
27	Finland	83	Miro Sihvonen	MX2	KTM 250
27	Finland	84	Kim Savaste	Open	Kawasaki 250
28	Croatia	88	Hrvoje Karas	MXGP	Yamaha 450
28	Croatia	89	Luka Crnkovic	MX2	Yamaha 250
28	Croatia	90	Matej Jaros	Open	Kawasaki 450
29	Ukraine	91	Roman Morozov	MXGP	Kawasaki 450
29	Ukraine	92	Volodymyr Tarasov	MX2	KTM 250
29	Ukraine	93	Yuriy Naumchyk	Open	Yamaha 450
30	Greece	94	Dimitrios Kontoletas	MXGP	Yamaha 450
30	Greece	95	Emmanouil Kritikos	MX2	Yamaha 250
30	Greece	96	Panagiotis Kouzis	Open	Honda 450
31	Puerto Rico	97	Jason Astudillo	MXGP	Kawasaki 450
31	Puerto Rico	98	Gino Aponte	MX2	Kawasaki 450
31	Puerto Rico	99	Noah McConahy	Open	Husqvarna 450
32	Luxembourg	100	Eric Tabouraing	MXGP	Kawasaki 450
32	Luxembourg	101	Yves Frank	MX2	Honda 250
32	Luxembourg	102	Björn Frank	Open	Honda 450
33	Israel	106	Ziv Karmi	MXGP	
33	Israel	107	Dan Maya	MX2	
33	Israel	108	Oren Hasson	Open	
34	South Africa	109	Kerim Fitz-Gerald	MXGP	KTM 450
34	South Africa	110	Nicholas Adams	MX2	Honda 250
34	South Africa	111	Michael Docherty	Open	Kawasaki 450
35	Canada	112	Kaven Benoit	MXGP	KTM 450
35	Canada	113	Shawn Maffenbeier	MX2	KTM 250
35	Canada	114	Tyler Medaglia	Open	KTM 450
36	Hungary	115	Erik Hugyecz	MXGP	KTM 450
36	Hungary	116	Bence Szvoboda	MX2	KTM 250
36	Hungary	117	Mark Szoke	Open	Suzuki 450
37	Iceland	118	Ingvi Bjorn Birgisson	MXGP	KTM 450
37	Iceland	119	Eythor Reynisson	MX2	Kawasaki 250
37	Iceland	120	Andri Gudmundsson	Open	KTM 450
38	Thailand*	121	Chaiyan Romphan	MXGP	Yamaha 450
38	Thailand*	122	Traiphop Boontaeng	MX2	KTM 250
38	Thailand*	123	Kritsada Potaton	Open	Kawasaki 450
39	San Marino	124	Thomas Marini	MXGP	Husqvarna 450
39	San Marino	125	Andrea Gorini	MX2	Suzuki 250
39	San Marino	126	Bryan Toccaceli	Open	Yamaha 250
	Country	Nr	Rider	Class	Motorcycle

- Thailand withdrew from the event.

== Practice ==
Practice is run on a class by class basis.

=== MXGP ===
Place	Nr	Rider	Motorcycle	Time	Difference
1	1	(France) Febvre	Yamaha	1:53.573	
2	25	(Germany) Nagl	Husqvarna	1:54.858	+1.285
3	7	(Belgium) Strijbos	Suzuki	1:55.252	+1.679
4	40	(Italy) Cairoli	KTM	1:55.345	+1.772
5	4	(United States) Webb	Yamaha	1:55.906	+2.333
6	16	(Netherlands) Coldenhoff	KTM	1:56.008	+2.435
7	13	(Switzerland) Guillod	Yamaha	1:56.064	+2.491
8	52	(United Kingdom) Searle	Kawasaki	1:56.638	+3.065
9	19	(Australia) Waters	Suzuki	1:57.654	+4.081
10	31	(Spain) Butrón	KTM	1:57.723	+4.150
11	10	(Estonia) Rätsep	Honda	1:59.161	+5.588
12	43	(Denmark) Larsen	KTM	1:59.211	+5.638
13	46	(Portugal) Gonçalves	Husqvarna	1:59.255	+5.682
14	37	(Sweden) Gole	Husqvarna	1:59.274	+5.701
15	112	(Canada) Benoit	KTM	1:59.687	+6.114
16	22	(New Zealand) Cooper	Honda	2:00.037	+6.464
17	28	(Austria) Neurauter	KTM	2:00.414	+6.841
18	115	(Hungary) Hugyecz	KTM	2:00.814	+7.241
19	61	(Slovenia) Irt	Yamaha	2:01.480	+7.907
20	55	(Latvia) Ivanovs	Yamaha	2:01.791	+8.218
21	82	(Finland) Malin	KTM	2:02.243	+8.670
22	70	(Poland) Lonka	KTM	2:02.566	+8.993
23	79	(Brazil) dos Santos	Yamaha	2:03.371	+9.798
24	58	(Japan) Narita	Honda	2:03.428	+9.855
25	73	(Lithuania) Bucas	Yamaha	2:03.519	+9.946
26	124	(San Marino) Marini	Husqvarna	2:03.795	+10.222
27	64	(Czech Republic) Romancik	Suzuki	2:04.834	+11.261
28	91	(Ukraine) Morozov	Yamaha	2:05.955	+12.382
29	34	(Russia) Rogozin	Husqvarna	2:06.058	+12.485
30	109	(South Africa) Fitzgerald	KTM	2:06.274	+12.701
31	76	(Slovakia) Simko	Honda	2:07.271	+13.698
32	88	(Croatia) Karas	Yamaha	2:07.850	+14.277
33	97	(Puerto Rico) Astudillo	Kawasaki	2:10.544	+16.971
34	94	(Greece) Kontoletas	Yamaha	2:16.481	+22.908
35	49	(Republic of Ireland) Irwin*	Honda	2:20.154	+26.581
36	100	(Luxembourg) Tabouraing	Kawasaki	2:26.581	+33.008
37	106	(Israel) Karmi	KTM	2:30.017	+36.444
38	118	(Iceland) Birgisson*	Kawasaki	2:38.008	+44.435
Place	Nr	Rider	Motorcycle	Time	Difference

=== MX2 ===
Place	Nr	Rider	Motorcycle	Time	Difference
1	8	(Belgium) van Horebeek	Yamaha	1:54.284	
2	5	(United States) Martin	Yamaha	1:54.299	+0.015
3	14	(Switzerland) Seewer	Suzuki	1:55.821	+1.537
4	17	(Netherlands) Bogers	KTM	1:56.106	+1.821
5	2	(France) Paturel	Yamaha	1:56.147	+1.863
6	41	(Italy) Bernardini	TM	1:56.336	+2.052
7	11	(Estonia) Leok	KTM	1:56.588	+2.304
8	32	(Spain) Prado	KTM	1:56.608	+2.324
9	53	(United Kingdom) Anstie	Husqvarna	1:57.028	+2.744
10	44	(Denmark) Kjer Olsen	Husqvarna	1:57.036	+2.752
11	35	(Russia) Brylyakov	Kawasaki	1:57.235	+2.951
12	26	(Germany) Jacobi	KTM	1:57.779	+3.495
13	38	(Sweden) Östlund	Yamaha	1:58.100	+3.816
14	116	(Hungary) Szvoboda	KTM	1:58.337	+4.053
15	20	(Australia) Evans	Yamaha	1:58.809	+4.525
16	113	(Canada) Maffenbeier	KTM	1:59.239	+4.955
17	65	(Czech Republic) Neugebauer	Kawasaki	1:59.394	+5.110
18	50	(Republic of Ireland) Barr	Honda	1:59.411	+5.127
19	56	(Latvia) Sabulis	Yamaha	1:59.561	+5.227
20	83	(Finland) Sihvonen	KTM	1:59.595	+5.311
21	23	(New Zealand) Natzke	KTM	1:59.940	+5.656
22	77	(Slovakia) Sikyna	KTM	2:00.086	+5.802
23	110	(South Africa) Adams	Honda	2:00.249	+5.965
24	92	(Ukraine) Tarasov	KTM	2:00.721	+6.437
25	62	(Slovenia) Pancar	Yamaha	2:01.526	+7.242
26	29	(Austria) Sandner	KTM	2:01.714	+7.430
27	47	(Portugal) Basaula	Kawasaki	2:01.745	+7.461
28	59	(Japan) Notsuka	Honda	2:01.877	+7.593
29	74	(Lithuania) Karka	KTM	2:02.728	+8.444
30	71	(Poland) Staszkiewicz	KTM	2:03.594	+9.310
31	80	(Brazil) Alves	Yamaha	2:04.313	+10.029
32	119	(Iceland) Reynisson	Kawasaki	2:04.744	+10.460
33	89	(Croatia) Crnkovic	Yamaha	2:04.894	+10.610
34	95	(Greece) Kritikos	Yamaha	2:07.901	+13.617
35	98	(Puerto Rico) Aponte	Yamaha	2:09.051	+14.767
36	125	(San Marino) Gorini	Suzuki	2:09.555	+15.271
37	107	(Israel) Maya	Kawasaki	2:23.827	+29.543
38	101	(Luxembourg) Frank	Honda	2:25.950	+31.666
Place	Nr	Rider	Motorcycle	Time	Difference

- During Practice, Team Ireland rider Graeme Irwin and Team Iceland rider Ingvi Bjorn Birgisson were injured. They would take no further part in the event.

=== Open ===
Place	Nr	Rider	Motorcycle	Time	Difference
1	6	(United States) Anderson	Husqvarna	1:52.252	
2	3	(France) Paulin	Honda	1:52.814	+0.562
3	18	(Netherlands) Herlings	KTM	1:53.207	+0.955
4	54	(United Kingdom) Simpson	KTM	1:54.120	+1.868
5	15	(Switzerland) Tonus	Kawasaki	1:54.407	+2.155
6	42	(Italy) Cervellin	Honda	1:54.597	+2.345
7	36	(Russia) Bobryshev	Honda	1:54.698	+2.446
8	26	(Australia) Ferris	Husqvarna	1:54.709	+2.457
9	9	(Belgium) Van Doninck	Yamaha	1:55.665	+3.413
10	39	(Sweden) Noren	Honda	1:56.023	+3.771
11	75	(Lithuania) Jasikonis	Suzuki	1:56.290	+4.038
12	27	(Germany) Ullrich	KTM	1:56.503	+4.251
13	33	(Spain) Zaragoza	Honda	1:56.594	+4.342
14	12	(Estonia) Kullas	KTM	1:56.724	+4.472
15	114	(Canada) Medaglia	Husqvarna	1:57.262	+5.010
16	66	(Czech Republic) Smitka	KTM	1:57.692	+5.440
17	99	(Puerto Rico) McConahy	Kawasaki	1:57.755	+5.503
18	60	(Japan) Yamamoto	Honda	1:58.002	+5.750
19	48	(Portugal) Alberto	Honda	1:58.664	+6.412
20	63	(Slovenia) Irt	Yamaha	1:58.884	+6.632
21	45	(Denmark) Meier	KTM	1:59.027	+6.775
22	30	(Austria) Rauchenecker	Husqvarna	1:59.110	+6.858
23	111	(South Africa) Docherty	Kawasaki	1:59.176	+6.924
24	51	(Republic of Ireland) Edmonds	TM	1:59.433	+7.181
25	126	(San Marino) Toccaceli	Yamaha	2:00.356	+8.104
26	72	(Poland) Wysocki	KTM	2:00.509	+8.257
27	78	(Slovakia) Kohut	KTM	2:00.594	+8.342
28	57	(Latvia) Macuks	Kawasaki	2:00.894	+8.642
29	24	(New Zealand) Harwood	KTM	2:01.247	+8.995
30	81	(Brazil) Ramos	Yamaha	2:01.464	+9.212
31	117	(Hungary) Szoke	Suzuki	2:03.154	+10.902
32	90	(Croatia) Jaros	Kawasaki	2:03.322	+11.070
33	84	(Finland) Savaste*	Kawasaki	2:05.460	+13.208
34	120	(Iceland) Gudmundsson	Honda	2:07.350	+15.098
35	96	(Greece) Kouzis	Honda	2:07.514	+15.262
36	102	(Luxembourg) Frank	Honda	2:10.513	+18.261
37	93	(Ukraine) Naumchyk	Yamaha	2:17.704	+25.452
38	108	(Israel) Hasson	Honda	2:21.092	+28.840
Place	Nr	Rider	Motorcycle	Time	Difference

- Team Finland's Kim Savaste picked up an injury during practice. He will take no further part in the event.

== Qualifying Races ==
The Qualifying races are also run on a class by class basis and are used to decide which nations qualify directly to the main final. Each nation will be awarded points that correlate with their riders finishing position in the race, with the top 19 teams going to the Motocross of Nations main races. The remaining nations will go to the two smaller finals where they will have the chance to become the 20th team in the main finals. Only the best two scores count for each nation, with their third being dropped. Team Ireland and Team Iceland only have two riders remaining, meaning both of their scores will count. The points allocated for qualifying are not carried over to the finals.

=== MXGP ===
Place	Nr	Rider	Motorcycle	Time	Difference	Points
1	1	(France) Febvre	Yamaha	24:59.780		1
2	40	(Italy) Cairoli	KTM	25:17.845	+18.065	2
3	7	(Belgium) Strijbos	Suzuki	25:21.990	+22.210	3
4	52	(United Kingdom) Searle	Kawasaki	25:33.769	+33.989	4
5	16	(Netherlands) Coldenhoff	KTM	25:53.562	+53.782	5
6	31	(Spain) Butrón	KTM	25:57.395	+57.615	6
7	19	(Australia) Waters	Suzuki	26:00.900	+1:01.120	7
8	28	(Austria) Neurauter	KTM	26:05.994	+1:06.214	8
9	58	(Japan) Narita	Honda	26:07.511	+1:07.731	9
10	112	(Canada) Benoit	KTM	26:08.130	+1:08.350	10
11	43	(Denmark) Larsen	KTM	26:08.561	+1:08.781	11
12	22	(New Zealand) Cooper	Honda	26:09.358	+1:09.578	12
13	37	(Sweden) Gole	Husqvarna	26:09.900	+1:10.120	13
14	10	(Estonia) Rätsep	Honda	26:10.269	+1:10.489	14
15	55	(Latvia) Ivanovs	Yamaha	26:35.298	+1:35.518	15
16	46	(Portugal) Gonçalves	Husqvarna	26:35.468	+1:35.688	16
17	73	(Lithuania) Bucas	Yamaha	26:48.203	+1:48.423	17
18	4	(United States) Webb	Yamaha	26:50.822	+1:51.042	18
19	82	(Finland) Malin	KTM	26:52.935	+1:53.155	19
20	61	(Slovenia) Irt	Yamaha	26:53.444	+1:53.664	20
21	64	(Czech Republic) Romancik	Suzuki	27:26.133	+2:26.353	21
22	124	(San Marino) Marini	Husqvarna	25:11.080	+1 Lap	22
23	34	(Russia) Rogozin	Husqvarna	25:12.166	+1 Lap	23
24	79	(Brazil) dos Santos	Yamaha	25:14.141	+1 Lap	24
25	91	(Ukraine) Morozov	Yamaha	25:14.720	+1 Lap	25
26	70	(Poland) Lonka	KTM	25:27.046	+1 Lap	26
27	76	(Slovakia) Simko	Honda	25:30.807	+1 Lap	27
28	88	(Croatia) Karas	Yamaha	25:58.359	+1 Lap	28
29	97	(Puerto Rico) Astudillo	Kawasaki	26:34.812	+1 Lap	29
30	94	(Greece) Kontoletas	Yamaha	27:04.981	+1 Lap	30
31	100	(Luxembourg) Tabouraing	Kawasaki	26:07.878	+2 Laps	31
32	106	(Israel) Karmi	KTM	26:33.705	+2 Laps	32
	109	(South Africa) Fitzgerald	KTM	17:42.172	Retired	33
	13	(Switzerland) Guillod	Yamaha	2:28.149	Retired	34
	115	(Hungary) Hugyecz	KTM	0:00.000	Retired	35
	25	(Germany) Nagl	Husqvarna	0:00.000	Retired	36
	49	(Republic of Ireland) Irwin	Honda		Did Not Start	-
	118	(Iceland) Birgisson	Kawasaki		Did Not Start	-
Place	Nr	Rider	Motorcycle	Time	Difference	Points
