= 2017 Motocross des Nations =

The 2017 Motocross des Nations was a motocross race held on 1 October and 2 October 2017. The event was held at the Matterley Basin circuit, near Winchester, Great Britain. The event was originally meant to be held at Glen Helen Raceway in California, but had to be rescheduled due to concerns about crowd size.

France went into the event as the defending champions after taking their fourth title in 2016.

== Entry list ==
Start numbers are allocated based on the team finish from the previous year's edition. France are the reigning champions so they start with numbers 1, 2 and 3.

	Country	Nr	Rider	Class	Motorcycle
1	France	1	Gautier Paulin	MXGP	Honda 450
1	France	2	Christophe Charlier	MX2	Husqvarna 250
1	France	3	Romain Febvre	Open	Yamaha 450
2	Netherlands	4	Glenn Coldenhoff	MXGP	KTM 450
2	Netherlands	5	Brian Bogers	MX2	KTM 250
2	Netherlands	6	Jeffrey Herlings	Open	KTM 450
3	United States	7	Cole Seely	MXGP	Honda 450
3	United States	8	Zach Osborne	MX2	Husqvarna 250
3	United States	9	Thomas Covington	Open	Husqvarna 450
4	Belgium	10	Jeremy Van Horebeek	MXGP	Yamaha 450
4	Belgium	11	Brent Van Doninck	MX2	Yamaha 250
4	Belgium	12	Kevin Strijbos	Open	Suzuki 450
5	Italy	13	Antonio Cairoli	MXGP	KTM 450
5	Italy	14	Michele Cervellin	MX2	Honda 250
5	Italy	15	Alessandro Lupino	Open	Honda 450
6	Switzerland	16	Arnaud Tonus	MXGP	Yamaha 450
6	Switzerland	17	Valentin Guillod	MX2	Honda 250
6	Switzerland	18	Jeremy Seewer	Open	Suzuki 450
7	(United Kingdom) Great Britain	19	Max Anstie	MXGP	Husqvarna 450
7	(United Kingdom) Great Britain	20	Tommy Searle	MX2	Kawasaki 250
7	(United Kingdom) Great Britain	21	Dean Wilson	Open	Husqvarna 450
8	Australia	22	Dean Ferris	MXGP	Yamaha 450
8	Australia	23	Hunter Lawrence	MX2	Suzuki 250
8	Australia	24	Kirk Gibbs	Open	KTM 450
9	Estonia	25	Priit Rätsep	MXGP	Honda 450
9	Estonia	26	Harri Kullas	MX2	Husqvarna 250
9	Estonia	27	Tanel Leok	Open	Husqvarna 450
10	Canada	28	Colton Facciotti	MXGP	Honda 450
10	Canada	29	Shawn Maffenbeier	MX2	Yamaha 250
10	Canada	30	Tyler Medaglia	Open	Honda 450
11	Russia	31	Evgeny Bobryshev	MXGP	Honda 450
11	Russia	32	Evgeny Mikhaylov	MX2	Suzuki 250
11	Russia	33	Ivan Baranov	Open	Suzuki 450
12	Spain	34	José Butrón	MXGP	KTM 350
12	Spain	35	Jorge Prado García	MX2	KTM 250
12	Spain	36	Iker Larrañaga	Open	Husqvarna 450
13	Sweden	37	Filip Bengtsson	MXGP	KTM 450
13	Sweden	38	Alvin Östlund	MX2	Yamaha 250
13	Sweden	39	Fredrik Norén	Open	Honda 450
14	Denmark	40	Nikolaj Larsen	MXGP	KTM 450
14	Denmark	41	Thomas Kjær Olsen	MX2	Husqvarna 250
14	Denmark	42	Stefan Kjær Olsen	Open	Kawasaki 450
15	Czech Republic	46	Filip Neugebauer	MXGP	Kawasaki 450
15	Czech Republic	47	Petr Smitka	MX2	KTM 450
15	Czech Republic	48	Jaromír Romančík	Open	KTM 450
16	New Zealand	49	Cody Cooper	MXGP	Honda 450
16	New Zealand	50	Josiah Natzke	MX2	KTM 250
16	New Zealand	51	Hamish Harwood	Open	KTM 450
17	Lithuania	55	Domantas Jazdauskas	MXGP	KTM 450
17	Lithuania	56	Dovydas Karka	MX2	KTM 250
17	Lithuania	57	Arnas Milevičius	Open	Yamaha 450
18	(Republic of Ireland) Ireland	58	Stuart Edmonds	MXGP	TM 450
18	(Republic of Ireland) Ireland	59	Martin Barr	MX2	Honda 250
18	(Republic of Ireland) Ireland	60	Graeme Irwin	Open	Honda 450
19	Portugal	61	Rui Gonçalves	MXGP	Husqvarna 450
19	Portugal	62	Paulo Alberto	MX2	Honda 250
19	Portugal	63	Hugo Basaúla	Open	Kawasaki 450
20	Germany	64	Max Nagl	MXGP	Husqvarna 450
20	Germany	65	Henry Jacobi	MX2	Husqvarna 250
20	Germany	66	Dennis Ullrich	Open	KTM 450
21	Slovenia	67	Tim Gajser	MXGP	Honda 450
21	Slovenia	68	Jan Pancar	MX2	Yamaha 250
21	Slovenia	69	Peter Irt	Open	Yamaha 450
22	Brazil	70	Marcello Lima	MXGP	Kawasaki 450
22	Brazil	71	Fabio Santos	MX2	Yamaha 250
22	Brazil	72	Eduardo Lima	Open	Kawasaki 450
23	South Africa	73	Anthony Raynard	MXGP	Husqvarna 450
23	South Africa	74	Kerim Fitz-Gerald	MX2	KTM 250
23	South Africa	75	Neville Bradshaw	Open	Suzuki 450
24	Puerto Rico	76	Justin Starling	MXGP	Husqvarna 450
24	Puerto Rico	77	Darian Sanayei	MX2	Kawasaki 250
24	Puerto Rico	78	Marshal Weltin	Open	Kawasaki 450
25	Hungary	79	Márk Szőke	MXGP	KTM 450
25	Hungary	80	Krisztian Tompa	MX2	Yamaha 250
25	Hungary	81	Gábor Firtosvári	Open	KTM 450
26	Slovakia	82	Tomaš Šimko	MXGP	Suzuki 450
26	Slovakia	83	Richard Šikyňa	MX2	KTM 250
26	Slovakia	84	Tomáš Kohút	Open	KTM 450
27	Finland	85	Juuso Matikaïnen	MXGP	Husqvarna 350
27	Finland	86	Kim Savaste	MX2	Kawasaki 250
27	Finland	87	Jere Haavisto	Open	KTM 450
28	Poland	88	Tomasz Wysocki	MXGP	KTM 450
28	Poland	89	Gabriel Chętnicki	MX2	KTM 250
28	Poland	90	Szymon Staszkiewicz	Open	KTM 350
29	Croatia	91	Janko Martiniać	MXGP	Yamaha 450
29	Croatia	92	Luka Crnković	MX2	Yamaha 250
29	Croatia	93	Matija Kelava	Open	KTM 450
30	Latvia	94	Toms Macuks	MXGP	KTM 450
30	Latvia	95	Kārlis Sabulis	MX2	Yamaha 250
30	Latvia	96	Kristers Drevinskis	Open	KTM 450
31	Ukraine	97	Dmytro Asmanov	MXGP	Yamaha 450
31	Ukraine	98	Volodymyr Tarasov	MX2	KTM 250
31	Ukraine	99	Roman Morozov	Open	Yamaha 450
32	Greece	103	Georgios Iliopoulos	MXGP	KTM 450
32	Greece	104	Ioannis Touratzidis	MX2	Yamaha 250
32	Greece	105	Emmanouil Kritikos	Open	Kawasaki 450
33	Iceland	106	Ingvi Björn Birgisson	MXGP	KTM 450
33	Iceland	107	Andri Guðmundsson	MX2	Honda 250
33	Iceland	108	Eyþór Reynisson	Open	Kawasaki 450
34	Luxembourg	109	Eric Tabouraing	MXGP	Kawasaki 450
34	Luxembourg	110	Billy Lux	MX2	Honda 250
34	Luxembourg	111	Björn Frank	Open	Honda 450
35	Israel	112	Tomer Harel	MXGP	KTM 450
35	Israel	113	Dan Maya	MX2	Kawasaki 250
35	Israel	114	Ziv Karmi	Open	KTM 450
36	Thailand	115	Ben Prasit Hallgren	MXGP	Yamaha 450
36	Thailand	116	Kritsapa Potaton	MX2	Yamaha 250
36	Thailand	117	Chaiyan Romphan	Open	Yamaha 450
37	Norway	118	Håkon Engan Karlsen	MXGP	Suzuki 450
37	Norway	119	Kevin Horgmo	MX2	KTM 250
37	Norway	120	Sander Agard-Michelsen	Open	TM 450
38	Argentina	121	Joaquín Alberto Poli	MXGP	Honda 450
38	Argentina	122	Juan Pablo Luzzardi	MX2	KTM 250
38	Argentina	123	José Gerardo Felipe	Open	Kawasaki 450
39	Iran*	124	Amirreza Sabetifar	MXGP	Honda 450
39	Iran*	125	Ali Borzoozahdeh	MX2	Honda 250
39	Iran*	126	Alireza Parvareshbaladi	Open	Honda 450
	Country	Nr	Rider	Class	Motorcycle

- Iran entered a team but did not show up.

== Practice ==
Practice is run on a class by class basis.

=== MXGP ===
Place	Nr	Rider	Motorcycle	Time	Difference
1	67	(Slovenia) Gajser	Honda	2:25.561	
2	1	(France) Paulin	Husqvarna	2:26.400	+0.839
3	10	(Belgium) Van Horebeek	Yamaha	2:27.592	+2.031
4	19	(United Kingdom) Anstie	Husqvarna	2:27.890	+2.329
5	13	(Italy) Cairoli	KTM	2:28.916	+3.355
6	64	(Germany) Nagl	Husqvarna	2:29.050	+3.489
7	16	(Switzerland) Tonus	Yamaha	2:29.380	+3.819
8	4	(Netherlands) Coldenhoff	KTM	2:29.684	+4.123
9	31	(Russia) Bobryshev	Honda	2:29.759	+4.198
10	7	(United States) Seely	Honda	2:30.679	+5.118
11	61	(Portugal) Gonçalves	Husqvarna	2:32.488	+6.927
12	22	(Australia) Ferris	Yamaha	2:33.419	+7.858
13	25	(Estonia) Rätsep	Honda	2:33.666	+8.105
14	34	(Spain) Butrón	KTM	2:34.386	+8.825
15	28	(Canada) Facciotti	Honda	2:35.561	+10.000
16	37	(Sweden) Bengtsson	KTM	2:35.676	+10.115
17	40	(Denmark) Larsen	KTM	2:36.720	+11.159
18	76	(Puerto Rico) Starling	Kawasaki	2:37.175	+11.614
19	46	(Czech Republic) Neugebauer	Kawasaki	2:38.013	+12.452
20	88	(Poland) Wysocki	KTM	2:38.236	+12.675
21	70	(Brazil) Lima	Kawasaki	2:38.306	+12.745
22	58	(Republic of Ireland) Edmonds	TM	2:39.677	+14.116
23	49	(New Zealand) Cooper	Honda	2:40.609	+15.048
24	85	(Finland) Matikainen	Husqvarna	2:41.818	+16.257
25	82	(Slovakia) Simko	Suzuki	2:42.845	+17.284
26	121	(Argentina) Poli	Honda	2:43.113	+17.552
27	94	(Latvia) Macuks	KTM	2:43.606	+18.045
28	106	(Iceland) Birgisson	KTM	2:44.020	+18.459
29	73	(South Africa) Raynard	Husqvarna	2:44.044	+18.483
30	97	(Ukraine) Asmanov	Yamaha	2:45.124	+19.563
31	115	(Thailand) Hallgren	Yamaha	2:45.366	+19.805
32	79	(Hungary) Szoke	KTM	2:46.223	+20.662
33	118	(Norway) Karlsen	Suzuki	2:46.778	+21.217
34	55	(Lithuania) Jazdauskas	Yamaha	2:51.071	+25.510
35	91	(Croatia) Martinac	Yamaha	2:57.273	+31.712
36	109	(Luxembourg) Tabouraing	Kawasaki	3:13.996	+48.435
37	112	(Israel) Harel	KTM	3:21.083	+55.522
38	103	(Greece) Iliopoulos	KTM	3:33.548	+1:07.987
Place	Nr	Rider	Motorcycle	Time	Difference

=== MX2 ===
Place	Nr	Rider	Motorcycle	Time	Difference
1	8	(United States) Osborne	Husqvarna	2:28.733	
2	77	(Puerto Rico) Sanayei	Kawasaki	2:29.069	+0.336
3	23	(Australia) Lawrence	Suzuki	2:29.264	+0.531
4	41	(Denmark) Kjær Olsen	Husqvarna	2:30.320	+1.587
5	5	(Netherlands) Bogers	KTM	2:30.462	+1.729
6	20	(United Kingdom) Searle	Kawasaki	2:30.742	+2.009
7	11	(Belgium) Van Doninck	Yamaha	2:33.168	+4.435
8	65	(Germany) Jacobi	Husqvarna	2:33.779	+5.046
9	2	(France) Charlier	Husqvarna	2:33.780	+5.047
10	35	(Spain) Prado	KTM	2:33.839	+5.106
11	14	(Italy) Cervellin	Honda	2:33.959	+5.226
12	17	(Switzerland) Guillod	Honda	2:34.003	+5.270
13	38	(Sweden) Östlund	Yamaha	2:34.828	+6.095
14	29	(Canada) Maffenbeier	Yamaha	2:34.908	+6.175
15	26	(Estonia) Kullas	Husqvarna	2:34.941	+6.208
16	59	(Republic of Ireland) Barr	Honda	2:35.112	+6.379
17	47	(Czech Republic) Smitka	KTM	2:35.831	+7.098
18	50	(New Zealand) Natzke	KTM	2:35.983	+7.250
19	95	(Latvia) Sabulis	Yamaha	2:36.492	+7.759
20	92	(Croatia) Crnkovic	Yamaha	2:38.826	+10.093
21	119	(Norway) Horgmo	KTM	2:38.865	+10.132
22	86	(Finland) Savaste	Kawasaki	2:39.096	+10.363
23	83	(Slovakia) Sikyna	KTM	2:39.214	+10.481
24	71	(Brazil) Santos	Yamaha	2:39.646	+10.913
25	89	(Poland) Chetnicki	KTM	2:39.908	+11.175
26	62	(Portugal) Alberto	Honda	2:39.926	+11.193
27	68	(Slovenia) Pancar	Yamaha	2:40.055	+11.322
28	32	(Russia) Mikhaylov	Suzuki	2:42.241	+13.508
29	98	(Ukraine) Tarasov	KTM	2:42.395	+13.662
30	56	(Lithuania) Karka	KTM	2:42.445	+13.712
31	74	(South Africa) Fitz-Gerald	KTM	2:42.748	+14.015
32	80	(Hungary) Tompa	Yamaha	2:42.971	+14.239
33	122	(Argentina) Luzzardi	KTM	2:50.056	+21.323
34	107	(Iceland) Gudmundsson	Honda	2:52.308	+23.575
35	104	(Greece) Touratzidis	Yamaha	2:54.554	+25.821
36	116	(Thailand) Potaton	Yamaha	3:07.933	+39.200
37	110	(Luxembourg) Lux	Honda	3:11.723	+42.990
38	113	(Israel) Maya	Kawasaki	3:31.218	+1:02.485
Place	Nr	Rider	Motorcycle	Time	Difference

=== Open ===
Place	Nr	Rider	Motorcycle	Time	Difference
1	6	(Netherlands) Herlings	KTM	2:23.687	
2	3	(France) Febvre	Yamaha	2:25.337	+1.650
3	18	(Switzerland) Seewer	Suzuki	2:27.528	+3.841
4	9	(United States) Covington	Husqvarna	2:28.137	+4.450
5	15	(Italy) Lupino	Honda	2:28.462	+4.775
6	27	(Estonia) Leok	Husqvarna	2:28.472	+4.785
7	21	(United Kingdom) Wilson	Husqvarna	2:28.753	+5.066
8	12	(Belgium) Strijbos	Suzuki	2:29.661	+5.974
9	60	(Republic of Ireland) Irwin	Honda	2:29.953	+6.266
10	39	(Sweden) Noren	Honda	2:31.130	+7.443
11	24	(Australia) Gibbs	KTM	2:31.394	+7.707
12	42	(Denmark) Kjær Olsen	Kawasaki	2:31.928	+8.241
13	66	(Germany) Ullrich	KTM	2:34.411	+10.724
14	78	(Puerto Rico) Weltin	Kawasaki	2:34.838	+11.151
15	75	(South Africa) Bradshaw	Suzuki	2:35.764	+12.077
16	87	(Finland) Haavisto	KTM	2:35.776	+12.089
17	48	(Czech Republic) Romancik	KTM	2:35.837	+12.150
18	36	(Spain) Larranaga	Husqvarna	2:36.041	+12.354
19	30	(Canada) Medaglia	Honda	2:36.308	+12.621
20	72	(Brazil) Lima	Kawasaki	2:36.461	+12.774
21	120	(Norway) Agard-Michelsen	TM	2:37.509	+13.822
22	51	(New Zealand) Harwood	KTM	2:38.746	+15.059
23	108	(Iceland) Reynisson	Kawasaki	2:39.007	+15.320
24	33	(Russia) Baranov	Suzuki	2:39.018	+15.331
25	63	(Portugal) Basaula	Kawasaki	2:39.159	+15.472
26	84	(Slovakia) Kohut	KTM	2:40.396	+16.709
27	90	(Poland) Staszkiewicz	KTM	2:40.931	+17.244
28	123	(Argentina) Felipe	Kawasaki	2:41.040	+17.353
29	69	(Slovenia) Irt	Yamaha	2:41.154	+17.467
30	96	(Latvia) Drevinskis	KTM	2:41.217	+17.530
31	105	(Greece) Kritikos	Yamaha	2:44.414	+20.727
32	99	(Ukraine) Morozov	Yamaha	2:45.706	+22.019
33	93	(Croatia) Kelava	KTM	2:46.000	+22.313
34	81	(Hungary) Firtosvari	KTM	2:46.679	+22.992
35	57	(Lithuania) Milevicius	Yamaha	2:49.316	+25.629
36	117	(Thailand) Romphan	Yamaha	2:52.449	+28.762
37	111	(Luxembourg) Frank	Honda	2:58.530	+34.843
38	114	(Israel) Karmi	KTM	3:13.093	+49.406
Place	Nr	Rider	Motorcycle	Time	Difference

== Qualifying Races ==
Qualifying is run on a class by class basis. Top 19 countries after qualifying go directly to the main Motocross des Nations races. The remaining countries go to the two smaller finals. Best 2 scores count.

=== MXGP ===
Place	Nr	Rider	Motorcycle	Laps	Gap
1	67	(Slovenia) Gajser	Honda	10	
2	1	(France) Paulin	Husqvarna	10	+5.416
3	13	(Italy) Cairoli	KTM	10	+6.841
4	19	(United Kingdom) Anstie	Husqvarna	10	+21.486
5	10	(Belgium) Van Horebeek	Yamaha	10	+31.752
6	31	(Russia) Bobryshev	Honda	10	+35.494
7	22	(Australia) Ferris	Yamaha	10	+38.418
8	16	(Switzerland) Tonus	Yamaha	10	+39.206
9	7	(United States) Seely	Honda	10	+42.268
10	4	(Netherlands) Coldenhoff	KTM	10	+42.872
11	61	(Portugal) Gonçalves	Husqvarna	10	+1:19.900
12	49	(New Zealand) Cooper	Honda	10	+1:29.889
13	25	(Estonia) Rätsep	Honda	10	+1:32.489
14	28	(Canada) Facciotti	Honda	10	+1:37.358
15	37	(Sweden) Bengtsson	KTM	10	+1:46.704
16	34	(Spain) Butrón	KTM	10	+1:49.433
17	46	(Czech Republic) Neugebauer	Kawasaki	10	+1:49.766
18	76	(Puerto Rico) Starling	Kawasaki	10	+2:09.288
19	58	(Republic of Ireland) Edmonds	TM	10	+2:15.022
20	82	(Slovakia) Simko	Suzuki	10	+2:32.300
21	94	(Latvia) Macuks	KTM	10	+2:38.581
22	70	(Brazil) Lima	Kawasaki	10	+2:42.052
23	85	(Finland) Matikainen	Husqvarna	9	+1 Lap
24	121	(Argentina) Poli	Honda	9	+1 Lap
25	106	(Iceland) Birgisson	KTM	9	+1 Lap
26	79	(Hungary) Szoke	KTM	9	+1 Lap
27	118	(Norway) Karlsen	Suzuki	9	+1 Lap
28	55	(Lithuania) Jazdauskas	Yamaha	9	+1 Lap
29	91	(Croatia) Martinac	Yamaha	9	+1 Lap
30	40	(Denmark) Larsen	KTM	8	+2 Laps
31	97	(Ukraine) Asmanov	Yamaha	8	+2 Laps
32	115	(Thailand) Hallgren	Yamaha	8	+2 Laps
33	103	(Greece) Iliopoulos	KTM	8	+2 Laps
34	109	(Luxembourg) Tabouraing	Kawasaki	8	+2 Laps
35	112	(Israel) Harel	KTM	8	+2 Laps
	64	(Germany) Nagl	Husqvarna	3	Retired
	73	(South Africa) Raynard	Husqvarna	2	Retired
	88	(Poland) Wysocki	KTM	1	Retired
Place	Nr	Rider	Motorcycle	Laps	Gap

=== MX2 ===
Place	Nr	Rider	Motorcycle	Laps	Gap
1	8	(United States) Osborne	Husqvarna	10	2:28.733
2	23	(Australia) Lawrence	Suzuki	10	+1.129
3	5	(Netherlands) Bogers	KTM	10	+24.169
4	35	(Spain) Prado	KTM	10	+25.359
5	41	(Denmark) Kjær Olsen	Husqvarna	10	+27.304
6	77	(Puerto Rico) Sanayei	Kawasaki	10	+30.267
7	20	(United Kingdom) Searle	Kawasaki	10	+43.731
8	2	(France) Charlier	Husqvarna	10	+46.334
9	17	(Switzerland) Guillod	Honda	10	+1:12.973
10	26	(Estonia) Kullas	Husqvarna	10	+1:13.996
11	29	(Canada) Maffenbeier	Yamaha	10	+1:14.791
12	65	(Germany) Jacobi	Husqvarna	10	+1:15.844
13	14	(Italy) Cervellin	Honda	10	+1:26.310
14	59	(Republic of Ireland) Barr	Honda	10	+1:26.917
15	62	(Portugal) Alberto	Honda	10	+1:29.280
16	38	(Sweden) Östlund	Yamaha	10	+1:30.199
17	95	(Latvia) Sabulis	Yamaha	10	+1:30.770
18	11	(Belgium) Van Doninck	Yamaha	10	+1:32.646
19	47	(Czech Republic) Smitka	KTM	10	+1:33.112
20	119	(Norway) Horgmo	KTM	10	+1:51.205
21	83	(Slovakia) Sikyna	KTM	10	+1:51.627
22	92	(Croatia) Crnkovic	Yamaha	10	+2:21.785
23	50	(New Zealand) Natzke	KTM	10	+2:46.400
24	32	(Russia) Mikhaylov	Suzuki	10	+2:50.065
25	89	(Poland) Chetnicki	KTM	10	+3:25.064
26	86	(Finland) Savaste	Kawasaki	9	+1 Lap
27	98	(Ukraine) Tarasov	KTM	9	+1 Lap
28	122	(Argentina) Luzzardi	KTM	9	+1 Lap
29	74	(South Africa) Fitz-Gerald	KTM	9	+1 Lap
30	80	(Hungary) Tompa	Yamaha	9	+1 Lap
31	56	(Lithuania) Karka	KTM	9	+1 Lap
32	68	(Slovenia) Pancar	Yamaha	9	+1 Lap
33	104	(Greece) Touratzidis	Yamaha	9	+1 Lap
34	71	(Brazil) Santos	Yamaha	8	+2 Laps
35	116	(Thailand) Potaton	Yamaha	8	+2 Laps
36	110	(Luxembourg) Lux	Honda	8	+2 Laps
	107	(Iceland) Gudmundsson	Honda	4	Retired
	113	(Israel) Maya	Kawasaki	0	Retired
Place	Nr	Rider	Motorcycle	Laps	Gap

=== Open ===
Place	Nr	Rider	Motorcycle	Laps	Gap
1	6	(Netherlands) Herlings	KTM	10	
2	3	(France) Febvre	Yamaha	10	+28.669
3	18	(Switzerland) Seewer	Suzuki	10	+35.853
4	24	(Australia) Gibbs	KTM	10	+43.400
5	21	(United Kingdom) Wilson	Husqvarna	10	+45.274
6	12	(Belgium) Strijbos	Suzuki	10	+59.581
7	9	(United States) Covington	Husqvarna	10	+1:05.754
8	60	(Republic of Ireland) Irwin	Honda	10	+1:09.555
9	27	(Estonia) Leok	Husqvarna	10	+1:12.723
10	15	(Italy) Lupino	Honda	10	+1:27.188
11	66	(Germany) Ullrich	KTM	10	+1:36.394
12	39	(Sweden) Noren	Honda	10	+1:48.504
13	42	(Denmark) Kjær Olsen	Kawasaki	10	+2:00.163
14	30	(Canada) Medaglia	Honda	10	+2:09.343
15	78	(Puerto Rico) Weltin	Kawasaki	10	+2:11.429
16	48	(Czech Republic) Romancik	KTM	10	+2:20.916
17	51	(New Zealand) Harwood	KTM	10	+2:26.732
18	36	(Spain) Larranaga	Husqvarna	10	+2:39.702
19	75	(South Africa) Bradshaw	Suzuki	10	+2:43.468
20	63	(Portugal) Basaula	Kawasaki	9	+1 Lap
21	84	(Slovakia) Kohut	KTM	9	+1 Lap
22	33	(Russia) Baranov	Suzuki	9	+1 Lap
23	105	(Greece) Kritikos	Yamaha	9	+1 Lap
24	120	(Norway) Agard-Michelsen	TM	9	+1 Lap
25	69	(Slovenia) Irt	Yamaha	9	+1 Lap
26	99	(Ukraine) Morozov	Yamaha	9	+1 Lap
27	108	(Iceland) Reynisson	Kawasaki	9	+1 Lap
28	123	(Argentina) Felipe	Kawasaki	9	+1 Lap
29	90	(Poland) Staszkiewicz	KTM	9	+1 Lap
30	93	(Croatia) Kelava	KTM	9	+1 Lap
31	96	(Latvia) Drevinskis	KTM	9	+1 Lap
32	72	(Brazil) Lima	Kawasaki	9	+1 Lap
33	81	(Hungary) Firtosvari	KTM	9	+1 Lap
34	57	(Lithuania) Milevicius	Yamaha	9	+1 Lap
35	111	(Luxembourg) Frank	Honda	9	+1 Lap
36	114	(Israel) Karmi	KTM	8	+2 Laps
	87	(Finland) Haavisto	KTM	2	Retired
	117	(Thailand) Romphan	Yamaha	0	Retired
Place	Nr	Rider	Motorcycle	Laps	Gap

=== Qualification Standings ===
- Qualified Nations

Place	Nation	Points
1	France	4
2	Netherlands	4
3	Australia	6
4	United States	8
5	(United Kingdom) Great Britain	9
6	Switzerland	11
7	Belgium	11
8	Italy	13
9	Denmark	18
10	Estonia	19
11	Spain	20
12	Puerto Rico	21
13	(Republic of Ireland) Ireland	22
14	Germany	23
15	Canada	25
16	Portugal	26
17	Slovenia	26
18	Sweden	27
19	Russia	28

- Nations Admitted to the B-Final

Place	Nation	Points
20	New Zealand	29
21	Czech Republic	33
22	Latvia	38
23	Slovakia	41
24	Norway	44
25	South Africa	48
26	Finland	49
27	Croatia	51
28	Argentina	52
29	Iceland	52
30	Ukraine	53
31	Brazil	54

- Nations Admitted to the C-Final

Place	Nation	Points
32	Poland	54
33	Hungary	56
34	Greece	56
35	Lithuania	59
36	Thailand	67
37	Luxembourg	69
38	Israel	71

== C-Final ==
The C-Final is for the bottom 7 nations after qualifying. The top nation from the C-Final qualifies for the B-Final. Best 2 scores for each nation counts.

=== Race ===
Place	Nr	Rider	Motorcycle	Laps	Gap
1	88	(Poland) Wysocki	KTM	9	
2	105	(Greece) Kritikos	Yamaha	9	+16.955
3	56	(Lithuania) Karka	KTM	9	+25.190
4	89	(Poland) Chetnicki	KTM	9	+37.089
5	80	(Hungary) Tompa	Yamaha	9	+54.337
6	79	(Hungary) Szoke	KTM	9	+1:05.612
7	115	(Thailand) Hallgren	Yamaha	9	+1:10.178
8	81	(Hungary) Firtosvari	KTM	9	+1:26.389
9	104	(Greece) Touratzidis	Yamaha	9	+1:39.528
10	57	(Lithuania) Milevicius	Yamaha	9	+1:42.599
11	111	(Luxembourg) Frank	Honda	9	+2:47.901
12	103	(Greece) Iliopoulos	KTM	8	+1 Lap
13	116	(Thailand) Potaton	Yamaha	8	+1 Lap
14	114	(Israel) Karmi	KTM	8	+1 Lap
15	112	(Israel) Harel	KTM	8	+1 Lap
16	109	(Luxembourg) Tabouraing	Kawasaki	8	+1 Lap
17	110	(Luxembourg) Lux	Honda	7	+2 Laps
	55	(Lithuania) Jazdauskas	Yamaha	4	Retired
Place	Nr	Rider	Motorcycle	Laps	Gap

=== C-Final Standings ===
- Poland qualify for the B-Final.

Place	Nation	Points
1	Poland	5
2	Hungary	11
3	Greece	11
4	Lithuania	13
5	Thailand	20
6	Luxembourg	27
7	Israel	29
Place	Nation	Points

== B-Final ==
The B-Final is for the nations who finished 20th-31st in qualifying, plus the winning nation from the C-Final. The top nation from the B-Final qualify for the Motocross des Nations races. Best 2 scores for each nation counts.

=== Race ===
Place	Nr	Rider	Motorcycle	Laps	Gap
1	48	(Czech Republic) Romancik	KTM	10	
2	83	(Slovakia) Sikyna	KTM	10	+16.011
3	50	(New Zealand) Natzke	KTM	10	+36.032
4	84	(Slovakia) Kohut	KTM	10	+49.782
5	82	(Slovakia) Simko	Suzuki	10	+1:13.861
6	75	(South Africa) Bradshaw	Suzuki	10	+1:21.375
7	51	(New Zealand) Harwood	KTM	10	+1:34.038
8	72	(Brazil) E. Lima	Kawasaki	10	+1:46.746
9	47	(Czech Republic) Smitka	KTM	10	+1:47.911
10	120	(Norway) Agard-Michelsen	TM	10	+2:08.283
11	71	(Brazil) Santos	Yamaha	10	+2:36.738
12	96	(Latvia) Drevinskis	KTM	10	+3:04.513
13	119	(Norway) Horgmo	KTM	10	+3:18.895
14	49	(New Zealand) Cooper	Honda	9	+1 Lap
15	93	(Croatia) Kelava	KTM	9	+1 Lap
16	46	(Czech Republic) Neugebauer	Kawasaki	9	+1 Lap
17	98	(Ukraine) Tarasov	KTM	9	+1 Lap
18	90	(Poland) Staszkiewicz	KTM	9	+1 Lap
19	95	(Latvia) Sabulis	Yamaha	9	+1 Lap
20	108	(Iceland) Reynisson	Kawasaki	9	+1 Lap
21	118	(Norway) Karlsen	Suzuki	9	+1 Lap
22	92	(Croatia) Crnkovic	Yamaha	9	+1 Lap
23	107	(Iceland) Gudmundsson	Honda	9	+1 Lap
24	121	(Argentina) Poli	Honda	9	+1 Lap
25	99	(Ukraine) Morozov	Yamaha	9	+1 Lap
26	106	(Iceland) Birgisson	KTM	9	+1 Lap
27	94	(Latvia) Macuks	KTM	8	+2 Laps
	85	(Finland) Matikainen	Husqvarna	7	Retired
	74	(South Africa) Fitz-Gerald	KTM	6	Retired
	123	(Argentina) Felipe	Kawasaki	4	Retired
	122	(Argentina) Luzzardi	KTM	3	Retired
	86	(Finland) Savaste	KTM	2	Retired
	70	(Brazil) M. Lima	Kawasaki	2	Retired
	91	(Croatia) Martinac	Yamaha	2	Retired
Place	Nr	Rider	Motorcycle	Laps	Gap

=== B-Final Standings ===
- Slovakia qualify for the Motocross des Nations races.

Place	Nation	Points
1	Slovakia	6
2	New Zealand	10
3	Czech Republic	10
4	Brazil	19
5	Norway	23
6	Latvia	31
7	South Africa	35
8	Croatia	37
9	Ukraine	42
10	Iceland	43
11	Argentina	54
12	Finland	60
13	Poland*	18
Place	Nation	Points

- Only 1 Polish rider started the race.

== Motocross des Nations races ==
The main Motocross des Nations races consist of 3 races which combine two classes together in each. Lowest score wins with each nation aloud to drop their worst score after the final race.

=== MXGP+MX2 ===
Place	Nr	Rider	Motorcycle	Laps	Gap
1	19	(United Kingdom) Anstie	Husqvarna	12	
2	67	(Slovenia) Gajser	Honda	12	+6.251
3	1	(France) Paulin	Husqvarna	12	+9.398
4	23	(Australia) Lawrence	Suzuki	12	+41.407
5	16	(Switzerland) Tonus	Yamaha	12	+44.978
6	31	(Russia) Bobryshev	Honda	12	+55.596
7	10	(Belgium) Van Horebeek	Yamaha	12	+1:00.247
8	4	(Netherlands) Coldenhoff	KTM	12	+1:08.634
9	41	(Denmark) Kjær Olsen	Husqvarna	12	+1:19.761
10	8	(United States) Osborne	Husqvarna	12	+1:31.126
11	13	(Italy) Cairoli	KTM	12	+1:46.090
12	5	(Netherlands) Bogers	KTM	12	+2:07.828
13	25	(Estonia) Rätsep	Honda	12	+2:12.448
14	2	(France) Charlier	Husqvarna	12	+2:14.581
15	38	(Sweden) Östlund	Yamaha	12	+2:19.584
16	61	(Portugal) Gonçalves	Husqvarna	12	+2:19.989
17	11	(Belgium) Van Doninck	Yamaha	12	+2:25.126
18	17	(Switzerland) Guillod	Honda	11	+1 Lap
19	65	(Germany) Jacobi	Husqvarna	11	+1 Lap
20	26	(Estonia) Kullas	Husqvarna	11	+1 Lap
21	37	(Sweden) Bengtsson	KTM	11	+1 Lap
22	22	(Australia) Ferris	Yamaha	11	+1 Lap
23	34	(Spain) Butrón	KTM	11	+1 Lap
24	58	(Republic of Ireland) Edmonds	TM	11	+1 Lap
25	59	(Republic of Ireland) Barr	Honda	11	+1 Lap
26	83	(Slovakia) Sikyna	KTM	11	+1 Lap
27	14	(Italy) Cervellin	Honda	11	+1 Lap
28	35	(Spain) Prado	KTM	11	+1 Lap
29	76	(Puerto Rico) Starling	Kawasaki	11	+1 Lap
30	29	(Canada) Maffenbeier	Yamaha	11	+1 Lap
31	77	(Puerto Rico) Sanayei	Kawasaki	10	+2 Laps
32	68	(Slovenia) Pancar	Yamaha	10	+2 Laps
33	62	(Portugal) Alberto	Honda	10	+2 Laps
34	28	(Canada) Facciotti	Honda	10	+2 Laps
35	32	(Russia) Mikhaylov	Suzuki	10	+2 Laps
	82	(Slovakia) Simko	Suzuki	5	Retired
	20	(United Kingdom) Searle	Kawasaki	2	Retired
	7	(United States) Seely	Honda	2	Retired
	40	(Denmark) Larsen	KTM	0	Retired
	64	(Germany) Nagl*	Husqvarna		Did Not Start
Place	Nr	Rider	Motorcycle	Laps	Gap

- Max Nagl was injured during the MX1 qualifying race.

=== Nations standings after Race 1 ===
Place	Nation	Points
1	France	17
2	Netherlands	20
3	Switzerland	23
4	Belgium	24
5	Australia	26
6	Estonia	33
7	Slovenia	34
8	Sweden	36
9	(United Kingdom) Great Britain	38
10	Italy	38
11	Russia	41
12	Denmark	48
13	United States	48
14	Portugal	49
15	(Republic of Ireland) Ireland	49
16	Spain	51
17	Puerto Rico	60
18	Slovakia	62
19	Canada	64
20	Germany	19
Place	Nation	Points

=== MX2+Open ===
Place	Nr	Rider	Motorcycle	Laps	Gap
1	6	(Netherlands) Herlings	KTM	13	
2	3	(France) Febvre	Yamaha	13	+13.730
3	8	(United States) Osborne	Husqvarna	13	+1:38.876
4	15	(Italy) Lupino	Honda	13	+1:40.149
5	24	(Australia) Gibbs	KTM	13	+1:44.122
6	2	(France) Charlier	Husqvarna	13	+1:49.117
7	21	(United Kingdom) Wilson	Husqvarna	13	+2:01.064
8	23	(Australia) Lawrence	Suzuki	13	+2:02.897
9	5	(Netherlands) Bogers	KTM	13	+2:07.211
10	41	(Denmark) T. Kjær Olsen	Husqvarna	13	+2:28.124
11	27	(Estonia) Leok	Husqvarna	13	+2:36.512
12	12	(Belgium) Strijbos	Suzuki	13	+2:44.575
13	77	(Puerto Rico) Sanayei	Kawasaki	13	+2:48.954
14	18	(Switzerland) Seewer	Suzuki	13	+2:56.050
15	20	(United Kingdom) Searle	Kawasaki	12	+1 Lap
16	30	(Canada) Medaglia	Honda	12	+1 Lap
17	39	(Sweden) Noren	Honda	12	+1 Lap
18	17	(Switzerland) Guillod	Honda	12	+1 Lap
19	38	(Sweden) Östlund	Yamaha	12	+1 Lap
20	42	(Denmark) S. Kjær Olsen	Kawasaki	12	+1 Lap
21	60	(Republic of Ireland) Irwin	Honda	12	+1 Lap
22	9	(United States) Covington	Husqvarna	12	+1 Lap
23	14	(Italy) Cervellin	Honda	12	+1 Lap
24	11	(Belgium) Van Doninck	Yamaha	12	+1 Lap
25	83	(Slovakia) Sikyna	KTM	12	+1 Lap
26	26	(Estonia) Kullas	Husqvarna	12	+1 Lap
27	29	(Canada) Maffenbeier	Yamaha	12	+1 Lap
28	84	(Slovakia) Kohut	KTM	12	+1 Lap
29	63	(Portugal) Basaula	Kawasaki	12	+1 Lap
30	36	(Spain) Larranaga	Husqvarna	11	+2 Laps
31	62	(Portugal) Alberto	Honda	11	+2 Laps
32	68	(Slovenia) Pancar	Yamaha	11	+2 Laps
33	59	(Republic of Ireland) Barr	Honda	11	+2 Laps
34	78	(Puerto Rico) Weltin	Kawasaki	11	+2 Laps
35	33	(Russia) Baranov	Suzuki	11	+2 Laps
36	32	(Russia) Mikhaylov	Suzuki	11	+2 Laps
	66	(Germany) Ullrich	KTM	10	Retired
	69	(Slovenia) Irt	Yamaha	9	Retired
	65	(Germany) Jacobi	Husqvarna	1	Retired
	35	(Spain) Prado	KTM	1	Retired
Place	Nr	Rider	Motorcycle	Laps	Gap

=== Nations standings after Race 2 ===
Place	Nation	Points
1	France	25
2	Netherlands	30
3	Australia	39
4	Switzerland	55
5	(United Kingdom) Great Britain	60
6	Belgium	60
7	Italy	65
8	Estonia	70
9	Sweden	72
10	United States	73
11	Denmark	78
12	(Republic of Ireland) Ireland	103
13	Slovenia	104
14	Puerto Rico	107
15	Canada	107
16	Portugal	109
17	Russia	112
18	Slovakia	115
19	Spain	121
20	Germany	95
Place	Nation	Points

=== MXGP+Open ===
Place	Nr	Rider	Motorcycle	Laps	Gap
1	19	(United Kingdom) Anstie	Husqvarna	13	
2	6	(Netherlands) Herlings	KTM	13	+1.108
3	3	(France) Febvre	Yamaha	13	+1:00.011
4	10	(Belgium) Van Horebeek	Yamaha	13	+1:20.559
5	67	(Slovenia) Gajser	Honda	13	+1:27.401
6	1	(France) Paulin	Husqvarna	13	+1:36.967
7	13	(Italy) Cairoli	KTM	13	+1:44.854
8	21	(United Kingdom) Wilson	Husqvarna	13	+1:51.593
9	18	(Switzerland) Seewer	Suzuki	13	+2:02.765
10	16	(Switzerland) Tonus	Yamaha	13	+2:07.648
11	4	(Netherlands) Coldenhoff	KTM	13	+2:24.491
12	31	(Russia) Bobryshev	Honda	13	+3:01.696
13	12	(Belgium) Strijbos	Suzuki	12	+1 Lap
14	27	(Estonia) Leok	Husqvarna	12	+1 Lap
15	39	(Sweden) Noren	Honda	12	+1 Lap
16	61	(Portugal) Gonçalves	Husqvarna	12	+1 Lap
17	9	(United States) Covington	Husqvarna	12	+1 Lap
18	15	(Italy) Lupino	Honda	12	+1 Lap
19	24	(Australia) Gibbs	KTM	12	+1 Lap
20	42	(Denmark) S. Kjær Olsen	Kawasaki	12	+1 Lap
21	30	(Canada) Medaglia	Honda	12	+1 Lap
22	60	(Republic of Ireland) Irwin	Honda	12	+1 Lap
23	22	(Australia) Ferris	Yamaha	12	+1 Lap
24	36	(Spain) Larranaga	Husqvarna	12	+1 Lap
25	28	(Canada) Facciotti	Honda	12	+1 Lap
26	37	(Sweden) Bengtsson	KTM	12	+1 Lap
27	84	(Slovakia) Kohut	KTM	12	+1 Lap
28	58	(Republic of Ireland) Edmonds	TM	12	+1 Lap
29	34	(Spain) Butrón	KTM	11	+2 Laps
30	76	(Puerto Rico) Starling	Kawasaki	11	+2 Laps
31	78	(Puerto Rico) Weltin	Kawasaki	11	+2 Laps
32	33	(Russia) Baranov	Suzuki	9	+4 Laps
	7	(United States) Seely	Honda	6	Retired
	66	(Germany) Ullrich	KTM	4	Retired
	63	(Portugal) Basaula	Kawasaki	4	Retired
	25	(Estonia) Rätsep	Honda	4	Retired
	69	(Slovenia) Irt	Yamaha	1	Retired
	40	(Denmark) Larsen	Suzuki		Did Not Start
	82	(Slovakia) Simko	Suzuki		Did Not Start
	64	(Germany) Nagl	Husqvarna		Did Not Start
Place	Nr	Rider	Motorcycle	Laps	Gap

=== Nations standings after Race 3 ===
Place	Nation	Points
1	France	20
2	Netherlands	31
3	(United Kingdom) Great Britain	32
4	Belgium	53
5	Switzerland	56
6	Australia	58
7	Italy	63
8	Estonia	84
9	United States	85
10	Sweden	87
11	Denmark	98
12	Slovenia	108
13	Canada	119
14	Russia	120
15	(Republic of Ireland) Ireland	120
16	Portugal	125
17	Puerto Rico	134
18	Spain	134
19	Slovakia	142
20	Germany	129
Place	Nation	Points

== Individual Classification ==
=== MXGP ===
Place	Nr	Rider	Motorcycle	Points
1	19	(United Kingdom) Max Anstie	Husqvarna	2
2	67	(Slovenia) Tim Gajser	Honda	7
3	1	(France) Gautier Paulin	Husqvarna	9
4	10	(Belgium) Jeremy Van Horebeek	Yamaha	11
5	16	(Switzerland) Arnaud Tonus	Yamaha	15
6	13	(Italy) Tony Cairoli	KTM	18
7	31	(Russia) Evgeny Bobryshev	Honda	18
8	4	(Netherlands) Glenn Coldenhoff	KTM	19
9	61	(Portugal) Rui Gonçalves	Husqvarna	32
10	22	(Australia) Dean Ferris	Yamaha	45
11	37	(Sweden) Filip Bengtsson	KTM	47
12	25	(Estonia) Priit Rätsep	Honda	49
13	58	(Republic of Ireland) Stuart Edmonds	TM	52
14	34	(Spain) José Butrón	KTM	52
15	28	(Canada) Colton Facciotti	Honda	59
16	76	(Puerto Rico) Justin Starling	Kawasaki	59
17	7	(United States) Cole Seely	Honda	71
18	82	(Slovakia) Tomas Simko	Suzuki	36
19	40	(Denmark) Nikolaj Larsen	KTM	39
20	64	(Germany) Max Nagl	Husqvarna	-
Place	Nr	Rider	Motorcycle	Points

=== MX2 ===
Place	Nr	Rider	Motorcycle	Points
1	23	(Australia) Hunter Lawrence	Suzuki	12
2	8	(United States) Zach Osborne	Husqvarna	13
3	41	(Denmark) Thomas Kjær Olsen	Husqvarna	19
4	2	(France) Christophe Charlier	Husqvarna	20
5	5	(Netherlands) Brian Bogers	KTM	21
6	38	(Sweden) Alvin Östlund	Yamaha	34
7	17	(Switzerland) Valentin Guillod	Honda	36
8	11	(Belgium) Brent Van Doninck	Yamaha	41
9	77	(Puerto Rico) Darian Sanayei	Kawasaki	44
10	26	(Estonia) Harri Kullas	Husqvarna	46
11	14	(Italy) Michele Cervellin	Honda	50
12	83	(Slovakia) Richard Sikyna	KTM	51
13	20	(United Kingdom) Tommy Searle	Kawasaki	52
14	29	(Canada) Shawn Maffenbeier	Yamaha	57
15	59	(Republic of Ireland) Martin Barr	Honda	58
16	65	(Germany) Henry Jacobi	Husqvarna	58
17	62	(Portugal) Paulo Alberto	Honda	64
18	68	(Slovenia) Jan Pancar	Yamaha	64
19	35	(Spain) Jorge Prado	KTM	68
20	32	(Russia) Evgeny Mikhaylov	Suzuki	71
Place	Nr	Rider	Motorcycle	Points

=== Open ===
Place	Nr	Rider	Motorcycle	Points
1	6	(Netherlands) Jeffrey Herlings	KTM	3
2	3	(France) Romain Febvre	Yamaha	5
3	21	(United Kingdom) Dean Wilson	Husqvarna	15
4	15	(Italy) Alessandro Lupino	Honda	22
5	18	(Switzerland) Jeremy Seewer	Suzuki	23
6	24	(Australia) Kirk Gibbs	KTM	24
7	12	(Belgium) Kevin Strijbos	Suzuki	25
8	27	(Estonia) Tanel Leok	Husqvarna	25
9	39	(Sweden) Fredrik Noren	Honda	32
10	30	(Canada) Tyler Medaglia	Honda	37
11	9	(United States) Thomas Covington	Husqvarna	39
12	42	(Denmark) Stefan Kjær Olsen	Kawasaki	40
13	60	(Republic of Ireland) Graeme Irwin	Honda	43
14	36	(Spain) Iker Larranaga	Husqvarna	54
15	84	(Slovakia) Tomas Kohut	KTM	55
16	63	(Portugal) Hugo Basaula	Kawasaki	64
17	78	(Puerto Rico) Marshal Weltin	Kawasaki	65
18	33	(Russia) Ivan Baranov	Suzuki	67
19	66	(Germany) Dennis Ullrich	KTM	71
20	69	(Slovenia) Peter Irt	Yamaha	75
Place	Nr	Rider	Motorcycle	Points
