= Brent Van Doninck =

Belgian motocross racer

- Nationality: Belgian
- Born: 15 January 1996 (age 30) Herentals, Belgium

Motocross career
- Years active: 2013–present
- Teams: KTM Scott Racing (2013); CreyMert Racing (2014); Kemea Yamaha (2015-2017); Husqvarna 8biano Motorsport/DIGA-Procross Husqvarna (2018); Team Honda Redmoto Assomotor (2019); ASA United Husqvarna (2020); Team Gebben Van Venrooy Yamaha Racing (2020-2021); Riley Racing (2022); JM Honda Racing (2023-2025); Fantic Factory Racing MXGP (2026)

Brent Van Doninck (born 15 January 1996) is a Belgian professional motocross racer. Van Doninck has competed in the Motocross World Championship since his first wildcard appearances during the 2012 season.

Van Doninck is a two-time podium finisher in the MX2 class of the Motocross World Championship. The first of these came during his first full season at world championship level in 2015, with his second coming in the 2017 season.

His long grand prix career means Van Doninck has raced for a number of teams and manufacturers, with his longest stints coming at the Kemea Yamaha team in MX2 and the JM Honda Racing team in MXGP.

Van Doninck has represented Belgium at the Motocross des Nations on four occasions, being part of the squad that finished in fourth in 2016 and 2017.

As a junior, Van Doninck won the Junior Cup class of the ADAC MX Masters in the 2009 season.

== Career ==
=== Junior career ===
After starting in the sport at a young age, Van Doninck progressed through the junior ranks in Belgium and around Europe. His international profile began to grow when he started to compete on an 85cc motorcycle, making several appearances in the European Championship between 2008 and 2010. Van Doninck won the Junior Cup title within the 2009 ADAC MX Masters championship and in 2010 finished runner-up in the same class.

Van Doninck competed on a 125cc motorcycle full-time in 2011 and finished seventh in the European Motocross Championship's EMX125 class, finishing fourth overall at the opening round. In the same season he finished twelfth overall in the 125 class of the FIM Motocross Junior World Championship.

=== 250 Career ===
==== 2012-2014 ====
Van Doninck moved up to compete in the EMX250 class of the European Motocross Championship for the 2012 season, finishing seventh in the final standings with a best overall position of fourth at the penultimate round. He joined that KTM Scott Racing team for the final round of the 2012 FIM Motocross World Championship, replacing the injured Valentin Guillod but not scoring points in either race. He signed to compete for the German-based team full-time during for the 2013 season. Van Doninck finished ninth in the standings of the EMX250 class, scoring one podium with a third place at the Finnish round. Throughout the season he made three wildcard appearances in the MX2 class of the 2013 FIM Motocross World Championship, scoring nine points with a best race finish of fourteenth.

Van Doninck joined the CreyMert team for the 2014 season, where he finished fourth in the EMX250 championship, taking the overall win at the third round and winning a race at penultimate round. He also made a single wildcard appearance at the fourth round of the 2014 FIM Motocross World Championship, failing to score any points.

==== 2015-2017: Kemea Yamaha ====
Van Doninck moved up to the MX2 class full-time for the 2015 FIM Motocross World Championship as part of the Kemea Yamaha Racing Team. He adjusted to the grand prix level quickly, being consistently in the top-ten throughout the remainder of the season. At the Dutch round in Assen, Van Doninck demonstrated his talent in the sand by securing his first podium finish with third overall. As well as finishing thirteenth in his first full MX2 world championship season, Van Doninck won the Belgian Championship in the Inter MX2 class.

Van Doninck stayed with the Kemea team for a second season in the 2016 FIM Motocross World Championship and had a set of strong results across the opening three rounds. A crash at an international race caused a dislocated hip, which then caused him to miss two rounds in Argentina and Mexico. After returning at the Latvian round, he would then miss four rounds mid-season following surgery on a wrist injury. He returned from this second period on the side lines for the final five rounds and ending the championship in fifteenth overall. Following the conclusion of the world championship season, Van Doninck made his debut representing Belgium at the 2016 Motocross des Nations, riding in the Open class as a replacement for Clement Desalle. Stepping up to race a 450cc motorcycle for the first time, Van Doninck was part of the team that finished fourth in the event, with his counted eighteenth place causing the team to fall three points short of the US in third.

The Belgian lined up for a third season with the Kemea team in the 2017 FIM Motocross World Championship. Van Doninck did not face the same injury woes as the previous season but struggled to make an impact at the front of the field in his third full season of MX2. His six top-six race finishes joined by his second career overall podium, which came again in the sand at the Dutch round, this time at the Valkenswaard circuit. This, along with his consistent points scoring performances, saw Van Doninck secure tenth in the final standings. He made his second appearance for Belgium at the 2017 Motocross des Nations, this time taking his spot in the more familiar MX2 class. Van Doninck performed slightly better than the previous season, recording a seventeenth in his first main race, with the team once again finishing fourth overall.

==== 2018-2019: Final Two MX2 Seasons ====
With Van Doninck's time at the Kemea squad coming to an end, he faced a fresh start with the Italian-based 8Biano Husqvarna team for the 2018 FIM Motocross World Championship. The team would collapse after only eight rounds however, with Van Doninck and his teammate Iker Larrañaga being able to clinch a move to the DIGA-Procross Husqvarna team for the following round onwards. A pre-season crash meant he did not come into the championship with a full winter of preparation. Van Doninck achieved modest results throughout the season, only moving towards the lower reaches of the top-ten in the second half of the season, following the team switch. His high point would be ninth overall at the Indonesian round in a depleted field, with him ending the championship in eleventh in the final standings.

For his final season in the MX2 class, Van Doninck joined the Team Honda Redmoto Assomotor squad. After and up-and-down start to the season, his results picked up mid-championship, with him again achieving his best overall results at the two Indonesian rounds. Van Doninck missed several races across the final five rounds and ended the championship in seventeenth overall.

=== 450 Career ===
==== 2020-2022 ====
Van Doninck moved up to compete on a 450cc motorcycle from the 2020 season onwards and found a home for his debut season at the British-based ASA United Husqvarna team. He competed in the opening two rounds of the 2020 FIM Motocross World Championship in the MXGP class and returned later in the year at the three grand prix held at Lommel in his native Belgium, following lockdown restrictions being lifted due to the COVID-19 pandemic. Van Doninck performed well at these three rounds, finishing eighth overall at the first of them and scoring top-ten finished in the other two. He was given the chance to ride the final three rounds for the Gebben Van Venrooy Yamaha team, where he scored four top-ten finishes across the six competed. Included within this was a sixth in the second race at the final round.

Following his successful stint with the Gebben team, Van Doninck signed to compete full-time for them in the 2021 FIM Motocross World Championship. He put in a consistent if not spectacular campaign, securing five top-ten race finishes as the high points. Van Doninck finished sixteenth in the final standings and returned to the Belgian team at the 2021 Motocross des Nations. With the event being held before the MXGP season ended due to the COVID-19 pandemic, Van Doninck recorded a notable result of fourth place in his first main race, with the team finishing sixth overall.

Van Doninck lost his ride with the Gebben squad for the 2022 season but was able to remain within the MXGP paddock with the Riley Racing team. He was able to achieve somewhat better results with the move, taking advantage of a rider boycott at the French round to finish third in the qualifying race and finish third in the opening race. A sixth overall in that grand prix was added to later in the season with a ninth in Belgium, seventh in Sweden and fifth in Finland. Van Doninck ended the championship in fifteenth and throughout the year he competed in the Dutch Masters of Motocross, where he finished fifth in the 500cc class standings.

==== 2023-2025: JM Honda Racing ====
After a single season with the Riley Racing squad, Van Doninck joined the JM Honda Racing team for the 2023 FIM Motocross World Championship. He showed top-ten speed across the opening rounds of the season, finishing eighth overall at the second round in Sardinia and the seventh round in France. At the eighth round in Latvia, Van Doninck had a heavy crash which resulted in a dislocated hip, ending his season due to required surgery. Prior to getting injured, he finished fourth in the 2023 Dutch Masters of Motocross series.

Van Doninck had his contract extended with the JM Honda team for the 2024 FIM Motocross World Championship. However, his season suffered a major setback at the opening round in Argentina, where a crash at the first corner of the qualifying race resulted in a broken femur. Van Doninck faced issues with local healthcare in Argentina, which included having a pin hammered into his lower leg without any anaesthesia. After recovering in Europe, he was able to return for the final quarter of the season, where he was able to secure an eighth overall at the Czech round. Van Doninck was called up to compete at the 2024 Motocross des Nations for Belgium, his fourth appearance at the event. His fourteenth in his first main race was coupled with a non-finish in the other, with the team finishing sixteenth overall.

He was retained for a third season on the same JM Honda team for the 2025 FIM Motocross World Championship. At a pre-season race held at Hawkstone Park, Van Doninck crashed and injured the same thigh he had broken in Argentina the previous season. He was able to being his world championship campaign at the seventh round in Portugal and as the season progressed he put in several notable rides. A sixth overall at the Finnish round, with a fourth place in the second race, was the highlight as he finished nineteenth in the final standings.

==== 2026: Fantic Factory Racing ====
The JM team became Fantic's factory effort in the MXGP class for the 2026 FIM Motocross World Championship, with Van Doninck forming a two-man team alongside Alberto Forato. The change of manufacturer saw Van Doninck struggle to reach his highs of previous seasons, with eleventh at the British and Czech rounds being his best overall results. Late in the season at the Swedish round, he crashed and picked up four broken ribs, which ruled him out for the remainder of the year.

== Honours ==
ADAC MX Masters

- Junior Cup: 2009 (gold) , 2010 (silver)

Belgian Motocross Championship

- Inter Open: 2016 (bronze)
- Inter MX2: 2015 (gold)

== Career statistics ==
=== Motocross des Nations ===
Year	Location	Nation	Class	Teammates	Team Overall	Individual Overall
2016	(Italy) Maggiora	BEL	Open	Kevin Strijbos; Jeremy Van Horebeek	4th	14th
2017	(United Kingdom) Matterley Basin	BEL	MX2	Jeremy Van Horebeek; Kevin Strijbos	4th	8th
2021	(Italy) Mantova	BEL	Open	Cyril Genot; Liam Everts	6th	10th
2024	(United Kingdom) Matterley Basin	BEL	MXGP	Lucas Coenen; Jago Geerts	16th	13th

=== FIM Motocross World Championship ===
==== By season ====
Season	Class	Number	Motorcycle	Team	Race	Race Wins	Overall Wins	Race Top-3	Overall Podium	Pts	Plcd
2012	MX2	172	KTM	KTM Scott Racing	2	0	0	0	0	0	N/A
2013	MX2	172	KTM	KTM Scott Racing	6	0	0	0	0	9	35th
2014	MX2	172	KTM	CreyMert Racing	2	0	0	0	0	0	N/A
2015	MX2	172	Yamaha	Kemea Yamaha Racing Team	28	0	0	0	1	272	13th
2016	MX2	172	Yamaha	Kemea Yamaha Racing Team	23	0	0	0	0	204	15th
2017	MX2	172	Yamaha	Kemea Yamaha Yamalube	36	0	0	1	1	309	10th
2018	MX2	172	Husqvarna	Husqvarna 8biano Motorsport	15	0	0	0	0	224	11th
2018	MX2	172	Husqvarna	DIGA-Procross Husqvarna	23	0	0	0	0	224	11th
2019	MX2	32	Honda	Team Honda Redmoto Assomotor	28	0	0	0	0	172	17th
2020	MXGP	32	Husqvarna	ASA United Husqvarna	10	0	0	0	0	110	21st
2020	MXGP	32	Yamaha	Team Gebben Van Venrooy Yamaha Racing	6	0	0	0	0	110	21st
2021	MXGP	32	Yamaha	Team Gebben Van Venrooy Yamaha Racing	35	0	0	0	0	152	16th
2022	MXGP	32	Yamaha	Riley Racing	30	0	0	1	0	249	15th
2023	MXGP	32	Honda	JM Honda Racing	15	0	0	0	0	114	22nd
2024	MXGP	32	Honda	JM Honda Racing	12	0	0	0	0	94	25th
2025	MXGP	32	Honda	JM Honda Racing	24	0	0	0	0	191	19th
2026	MXGP	32	Fantic	Fantic Factory Racing MXGP	27	0	0	0	0	146	19th
Total					322	0	0	2	2	2246	
