= Brian Bogers =

Dutch motocross racer

- Nationality: Dutch
- Born: 19 September 1996 (age 30); Eindhoven, Netherlands

Brian Bogers (born 19 September 1996) is a Dutch former professional Motocross racer. Bogers competed in the FIM Motocross World Championship from debuting as a wildcard in the MX2 class of the 2013 season, to the conclusion of the 2025 season in the MXGP class.

Bogers was the winner of the 2022 MXGP of Flanders at the Lommel circuit in the premier MXGP category, his only Grand Prix overall win to date.

Bogers has represented The Netherlands at the Motocross des Nations three times, being part of the teams that finished second overall in the event in 2016 and 2017.

In 2010, Bogers won the European Motocross Championship in the 85cc class.

== Career ==
=== Junior career ===
Bogers raced extensively around Europe and in The Netherlands whilst he was riding both a 65cc and an 85cc motorcycle. In 2010, he managed to win the EMX85 class of the European Motocross Championship, as well as finishing runner-up in the 85cc class of the Dutch Open Motocross Championship.

In 2011, Bogers competed in several rounds of both the EMX125 and EMX2 classes of the European Championships. He was able to finish second overall in the EMX125 class at the British round and scored points in the Dutch and Belgian rounds of the EMX2 class. In addition, he competed in the 125 class at that years FIM Motocross Junior World Championship, scoring three points.

=== 250 Career ===
From 2012, Bogers focused full-time on the European Championships, finishing ninth in his first full season of the EMX250 class and recording five top-six race finishes. He began his time within the HSF Logistics team in 2013, which saw him make the step forward to finish in fourth in the final standings of the EMX250 class. This included a podium at the final round with third on home soil. In addition to this, Bogers made two wildcard appearances in the MX2 class of the 2013 FIM Motocross World Championship. The first of these came at his home round in Valkenswaard, where he scored points in both races.

Bogers had his most successful European Championship season in 2014, where, after placing well in the early rounds, he was able to win the final three rounds of the season in Sweden, Finland and Belgium. His late season charge meant that he finished level on points with Steven Clarke at the top of the standings, however, as Bogers had only taken a single race win and Clarke had taken two he would have to settle for the runner-up spot. As well as finishing third in the MX2 class of the Dutch Open Motocross Championship, Bogers made four more wildcard appearances in the MX2 class of the 2014 FIM Motocross World Championship, with a best finish of thirteenth.

In 2015, Bogers made a full-time move to the MX2 class of the 2015 FIM Motocross World Championship, staying with the same team who themselves moved into World Championship-level competition permanently. He adapted well to the step-up in competition, rarely finishing outside of the top fifteen, with the highlight being a fifth place in the second race at his home round. Eleventh in the final standings in his first full-time world championship campaign was coupled with debuting at the Motocross des Nations, riding in the MXGP class of the 2015 event for his country. Bogers broke his collarbone at the third round of the 2016 FIM Motocross World Championship, but upon his return showed further progress throughout the remainder of the season, recording his first two world championship podiums in Mantua and Assen. Sixth overall in the MX2 final standings was coupled with Bogers being part of the Dutch team at the 2016 Motocross des Nations that finished in second, a point behind winners France.

The 2017 FIM Motocross World Championship would be the last for Bogers in the MX2 category, as well as his last riding for the HSF Logistics team. He had a consistent season, competing at every round with his best result being third overall at the Russian round of the series. Bogers was once again his nation's MX2 representative in the Motocross des Nations, where he put in improved personal performances from the previous year. A strong third in his Saturday qualifying race was a precursor to finishing twelfth and ninth in his two rides during the main MXdN races on the Sunday. This combined with the results of his teammates saw the Dutch team finish second for the second consecutive year.

=== 450 Career ===
Bogers moved up to the MXGP class for the 2018 FIM Motocross World Championship and by signing for Team HRC, became a factory rider for the first time in his career. Unfortunately, a pre-season foot injury that required significant recovery time, meant that Bogers was only able to compete in a single Grand Prix in 2018. His second season with the factory Honda team in 2019 saw him struggle to crack the top-ten throughout the year, whereas his teammate Tim Gajser was able to bring home the title. A single second place race finish in Mantua was the highlight as he finished thirteenth in the final standings.

The 2020 FIM Motocross World Championship saw Bogers move to the Marchetti Racing Team, returning to KTM machinery. Bogers showed great improvement as the season progressed and moved forward to become a regular figure within the top-eight by the end of the season. A fourth place in the first race in Lommel was his best placing as he secured tenth in the final standings. His results during the 2020 season were enough for Bogers to return to being a factory rider, this time aboard the Gas Gas being supported by the Standing Construct team. Despite missing two rounds of the championship, Bogers was able to finish twelfth in the final standings during the 2021 FIM Motocross World Championship season. Contributing to this were a pair of sixth overalls as his best results from the season.

The 2022 FIM Motocross World Championship would see Bogers' Standing Construct team move from being the factory team of the Gas Gas brand to the factory team of the Husqvarna brand. This would pave the way to his most successful World Championship season to date which began with picking up a third in the second race at round two of the season. At the fourth round he was able to finish third overall, his first World Championship podium finish since the 2017 season. He picked up another podium finish at the Spanish round, before reaching new heights again at the Belgian round in the deep sands of Lommel. In the opening race of that event, Bogers would pass both Jeremy Seewer and Jorge Prado to take his first ever World Championship race win. Third in the second race would also result in Bogers winning his first Grand Prix overall. He would take a further race in the opening race at the Finnish round, before finishing the season sixth in the final MXGP standings.

Bogers stayed with the Standing Construct team for the 2023 FIM Motocross World Championship season, but the team lost its status as the factory Husqvarna team and instead ran non-factory Honda's. Finishing more often than not outside of the top-ten and missing two rounds to drop to fifteenth overall in the MXGP standings. Following this, Bogers signed for the British GTCI Revo Gas Gas team for the 2024 season, to focus both on MXGP and the British Motocross Championship. However, before the start of the season the team's plans fell through and Bogers was without a ride. A few months later he received an opportunity from the French SR Honda team to compete in the famous 'Enduropale' beach race in Le Touquet, where he finished in fourth. As the start of the motocross season neared it seemed Bogers would not be competing professionally throughout the 2024 season. Not long after the start of the 2024 FIM Motocross World Championship, the Fantic Factory Racing team split with Roan van de Moosdijk and subsequently signed Bogers as his replacement from the third round onwards. Despite working a normal job in the off season, Bogers was able to able to immediately place in the top-ten of the MXGP class aboard the Fantic. He was able to finish as high as fourth overall at his third round on the bike and ended the season eleventh in the final standings.

Bogers had a difficult start to the 2025 FIM Motocross World Championship, missing the fifth round due to illness. Upon his return, Bogers recorded five top-ten overall finishes over the remaining Grand Prix. A sixth overall at the German round was the best of these, whilst a fourth in the deep mud in the second race at the second round in Spain was his best individual race result.

After the conclusion of the 2025 season, Bogers announced his retirement from the sport.

== Honours ==
Motocross des Nations

- Team Overall: (Netherlands) 2016 & 2017 (silver)

European Motocross Championship

- EMX250: 2014 (silver)
- EMX85: 2010 (gold)

Dutch Masters of Motocross

- 500cc: 2025 (bronze)

Dutch Open Motocross Championship

- MX2: 2014 (bronze)
- 85cc: 2010 (silver)

== Career statistics ==
=== Motocross des Nations ===
Year	Location	Nation	Class	Teammates	Team Overall	Individual Overall
2015	(France) Ernée	NED	MXGP	Nick Kouwenberg; Glenn Coldenhoff	6th	14th
2016	(Italy) Maggiora	NED	MX2	Glenn Coldenhoff; Jeffrey Herlings	2nd	7th
2017	(United Kingdom) Matterley Basin	NED	MX2	Glenn Coldenhoff; Jeffrey Herlings	2nd	5th

=== FIM Motocross World Championship ===
==== By season ====
Season	Class	Number	Motorcycle	Team	Race	Race Wins	Overall Wins	Race Top-3	Overall Podium	Pts	Plcd
2013	MX2	189	KTM	HSF Logistics Motorsport	4	0	0	0	0	7	41st
2014	MX2	189	KTM	HSF Logistics Motorsport	8	0	0	0	0	23	30th
2015	MX2	189	KTM	HSF Logistics Motorsport	32	0	0	0	0	310	11th
2016	MX2	189	KTM	HSF Logistics Motorsport	30	0	0	4	2	398	6th
2017	MX2	189	KTM	HSF Logistics Motorsport	38	0	0	2	1	407	8th
2018	MXGP	5	Honda	Team HRC	2	0	0	0	0	5	39th
2019	MXGP	189	Honda	Team HRC	34	0	0	1	0	228	13th
2020	MXGP	189	KTM	Marchetti Racing Team KTM	35	0	0	0	0	298	10th
2021	MXGP	189	Gas Gas	Standing Construct Gas Gas Factory Racing	32	0	0	0	0	290	12th
2022	MXGP	189	Husqvarna	Standing Construct Husqvarna Factory Racing	32	2	1	6	3	428	6th
2023	MXGP	189	Honda	Standing Construct Honda MXGP	32	0	0	0	0	243	15th
2024	MXGP	189	Fantic	Fantic Factory Racing MXGP	31	0	0	0	0	326	11th
2025	MXGP	189	Fantic	Fantic Factory Racing MXGP	37	0	0	0	0	300	13th
Total					347	2	1	13	6	3263	

==== Grand Prix wins ====
GP wins
GP-win count	Date	Grand Prix	Place
MXGP-class
1	24 July 2022	Flanders	Lommel
