= Valentin Guillod =

Swiss motocross racer (born 1992)

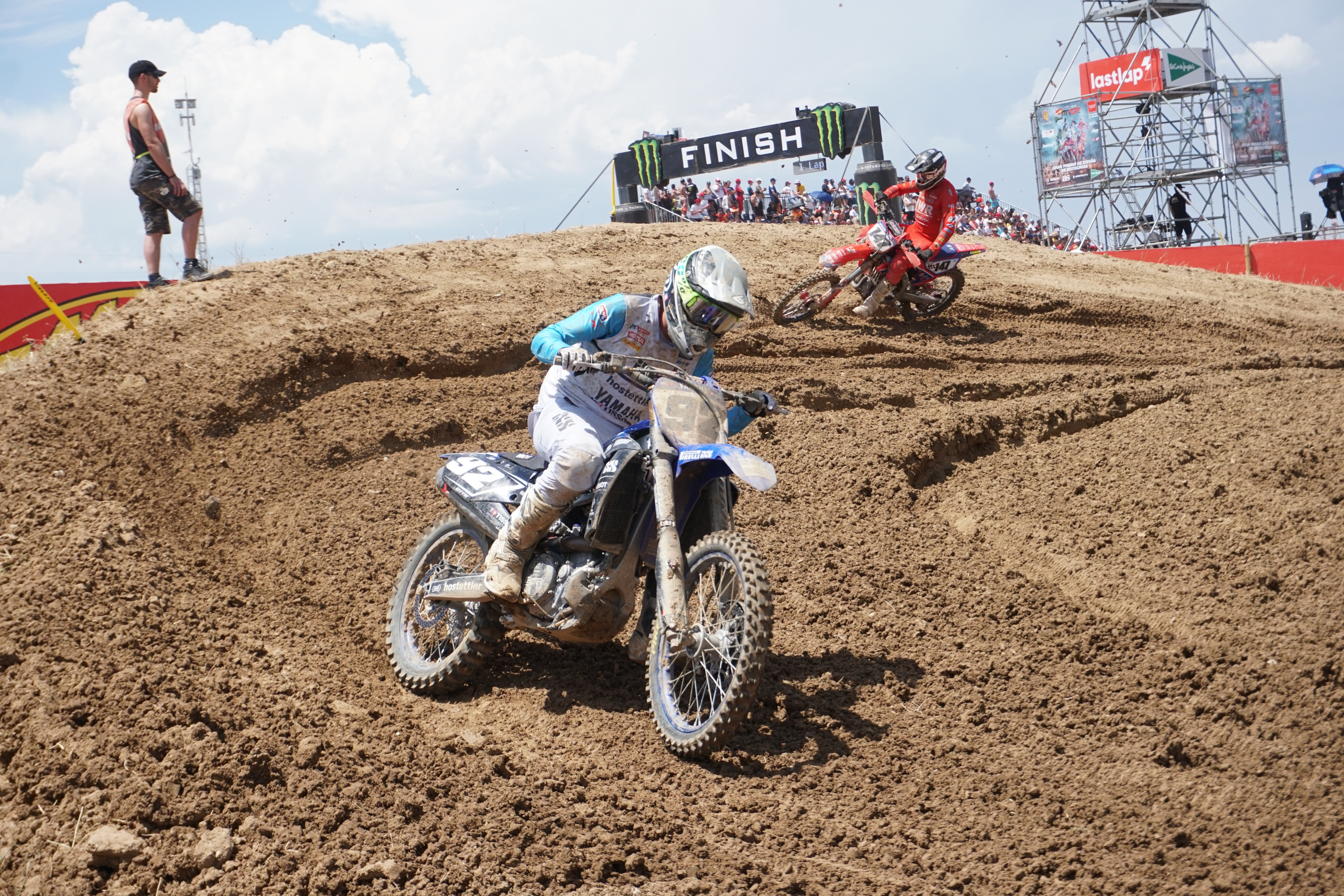
- Nationality: Swiss
- Born: 18 December 1992 (age 33); Fribourg, Switzerland
- Bike number: 92

Valentin Guillod (born 18 December 1992) is a Swiss professional Motocross racer. Guillod has competed in the Motocross World Championship since 2010 and is a three-time grand prix winner in the MX2 class.

More recently in his career, Guillod has competed in the America-based SuperMotocross World Championship, completing his first full-time season in 2026.

Guillod was the 2013 European Motocross Champion in the EMX250 class. He has represented his country at the Motocross des Nations fourteen times.

Guillod was the 2023 French Elite Motocross Champion in the Elite MX1 class and is a five-time Swiss Motocross Champion throughout his career.

== Career ==
=== 250 career ===
Guillod first appeared in the European Motocross Championship on 2009. In the following season, he was able to take two overall wins on the way to third place in the final standings of the EMX2 class. This came alongside making his grand prix debut in the MX2 class of the 2010 FIM Motocross World Championship in the Czech Republic.

These performances allowed Guillod to make his full-time MX2 World Championship debut in 2011 for the KTM Scott Racing Team. However, he was only able to compete in the first four rounds of the series with a best position of fifteenth. He was kept on by the same team for 2012 where he scored consistently throughout the season, finishing in an eventual twenty-first position in the final standings. Guillod was, for the first time, selected to compete for Switzerland at the Motocross des Nations in 2012.

For 2013, Guillod dropped into the EMX250 class of the European Motocross Championship, riding for his own Guillod Motorsports team. After a season long battle with compatriot Jeremy Seewer, Guillod was able to win the title picking up five overall wins and never finishing off of the podium along the way. He helped Switzerland to eighth position in that season's Motocross des Nations, stepping up to the 450 to race in the MXGP class. These performances were enough for Guillod to be signed for a full-time ride in the MX2 class of the 2014 FIM Motocross World Championship with Standing Construct KTM. This would result in a breakthrough season at world championship for Guillod. A final championship standing of seventh was backed up by his first two overall podiums in Czech Republic and Mexico.

2015 would be Guillod's final season in the MX2 class due to the under-23 age rule. Staying with the Standing Construct team who switched to Yamaha machinery, Guillod took three Grand Prix victories in Spain, Great Britain & Czech Republic finishing fourth in the final standings. In an opening part of the season dominated by Jeffrey Herlings, Guillod managed to outright beat the Dutchman in race two in Great Britain. At that season's Motocross des Nations, Guillod again rode in the MXGP class and formed part of the Swiss team who finished fifth.

=== 450 career ===
For Guillod's first season in the MXGP category, he would sign for the Kemea Yamaha team. He had a consistent season, scoring points in all but three races and collecting a third place in race one in Great Britain. Ninth place in the final standings was followed up by helping Switzerland finish sixth at the 2016 Motocross des Nations. Guillod changed teams for the 2017 FIM Motocross World Championship season, joining the Assomotor Honda team. The move saw his fortunes take a downturn, only competing in ten rounds of the season due to a hand injury and never breaking the top-ten. He dropped down the 250 to ride the MX2 class in the 2017 Motocross des Nations for Switzerland, helping them to another fifth-place finish. Guillod returned to the Standing Construct team for MXGP in 2018, however, this would once again only be a part campaign due to pre-season leg injury.

For 2019, Guillod stepped back from racing at world championship level full time, focussing instead on the Swiss Motocross Championship (where he became champion in the MX Open category) as well as the ADAC MX Masters in Germany. Despite racing outside of the FIM World Championship, Guillod represented Switzerland for the eighth time at the 2019 Motocross des Nations. The COVID-19-hit 2020 world championship season would see Guillod return to the MXGP class full-time with the Honda SR Motoblouz team. His results improved as the season went as he was able to return to the top-ten in the final few rounds. 2021 would see Guillod join the new Swiss-based Hostettler Yamaha squad, competing in MXGP as well as both the MX Open and MX2 classes of the Swiss Motocross Championship. Dominating both Swiss Championship classes, Guillod also competed at the 2021 Motocross des Nations, recording his highest ever individual overall.

2022 would see Guillod mix a full-time presence in the Swiss Motocross Championship across both classes with racing in the French Elite Motocross Championship and a part campaign in MXGP. He once again became a double national champion dominating both classes and was runner-up in France. In addition, a return to form closer to his earlier career was noticeable in MXGP. Out of ten races started, Guillod was able to score top-ten results in six of them, including a sixth-place finish in the first race in Turkey. To round the season off, Guillod competed in his tenth Motocross des Nations.

Guillod signed for the Ship to Cycle Honda Motoblouz SR Team for a full-time return to the MXGP class in 2023. He continued to show the improvements from the previous season, posting consistent top-10 finishes in MXGP for ninth in the final standings and winning the 2023 French Elite Motocross Championship. Making his eleventh appearance for Switzerland at the Motocross des Nations, Guillod helped his country to sixth overall. In the 2024 FIM Motocross World Championship, he was able to repeat his ninth place overall in the MXGP class, with a highest finish of fifth overall at the second Indonesian round. He was unable to successfully defend his French title, finishing second in the 2024 French Elite Motocross Championship. These results were followed by his twelfth appearance at the Motocross des Nations for Switzerland. Despite finishing ninth for two seasons on the run, Guillod was unable to secure a ride for the 2025 FIM Motocross World Championship. Opting to compete as a privateer, he raced the first six rounds of MXGP, securing a fifth place in the second race at the opening round as a standout result. Following this, Guillod travelled to the United States in the hope of picking up a deal to race the 2025 AMA National Motocross Championship. On a limited budget, he found a home in the Gizmo Mods Rock River Yamaha team and showed speed throughout the season, being a regular feature in the top-ten and finishing eighth overall twice whilst at times proving a match for four-time world champion Jorge Prado. After qualifying for the 2025 SuperMotocross World Championship playoff rounds and finishing sixteenth overall, Guillod was again selected to represent his country at the Motocross des Nations.

Following his results in America the previous year, Guillod signed to compete full-time in the states for the 2026 season for the Gizmo Racing Yamaha team. This move involved Guillod competing in Supercross for the first time, starting in the 250SX East class. He would only score eight points in the championship, after a fractured scapula picked up at the third round hampered his campaign. Guillod returned for the 2026 AMA National Motocross Championship but failed to reach the heights of the previous season, finishing seventeenth in the final standings. Following this, he competed in the SuperMotocross playoff rounds but failed to qualify at all three events. Guillod represented Switzerland at the 2026 Motocross des Nations, his fourteenth time at the event, where the team finished eighth overall for the second year running.

== Honours ==
European Motocross Championship

- EMX250: 2013 (gold)
- EMX2: 2010 (bronze)

French Elite Motocross Championship

- Elite MX1: 2023 (gold) , 2022 & 2024 (silver)

Swiss Motocross Championship

- MX Open: 2019, 2021 & 2022 (gold)
- MX2: 2021, 2022 (gold)
- Inter Open: 2010 & 2013 (bronze)
- Junior 125: 2008 (silver)

== Career statistics ==
=== Motocross des Nations ===
Year	Location	Nation	Class	Teammates	Team Overall	Individual Overall
2012	(Belgium) Lommel	SUI	Open	Arnaud Tonus; Jeremy Seewer	19th	18th
2013	(Germany) Teutschenthal	SUI	MXGP	Jeremy Seewer; Killian Auberson	9th	8th
2014	(Latvia) Ķegums	SUI	MXGP	Jeremy Seewer; Arnaud Tonus	7th	8th
2015	(France) Ernée	SUI	MXGP	Jeremy Seewer; Andy Baumgartner	5th	6th
2016	(Italy) Maggiora	SUI	MXGP	Jeremy Seewer; Arnaud Tonus	6th	10th
2017	(United Kingdom) Matterley Basin	SUI	MX2	Arnaud Tonus; Jeremy Seewer	5th	7th
2018	(United States) Red Bud	SUI	MXGP	Killian Auberson; Jeremy Seewer	19th	15th
2019	(Netherlands) Assen	SUI	MX2	Jeremy Seewer; Cyrill Scheiwiller	11th	9th
2021	(Italy) Mantua	SUI	Open	Arnaud Tonus; Mike Gwerder	8th	4th
2022	(United States) Red Bud	SUI	MX2	Jeremy Seewer; Kevin Brumann	9th	16th
2023	(France) Ernée	SUI	Open	Jeremy Seewer; Arnaud Tonus	6th	4th
2024	(United Kingdom) Matterley Basin	SUI	Open	Jeremy Seewer; Arnaud Tonus	9th	17th
2025	(United States) Ironman	SUI	Open	Jeremy Seewer; Nico Greutmann	8th	13th
2026	(France) Ernée	SUI	MXGP	Jeremy Seewer; Kevin Brumann	8th	12th

=== FIM Motocross World Championship ===
==== By season ====
Season	Class	Number	Motorcycle	Team	Race	Race Wins	Overall Wins	Race Top-3	Overall Podium	Pts	Plcd
2010	MX2	173	KTM		2	0	0	0	0	0	–
2011	MX2	173	KTM	KTM Scott Racing Team UG	8	0	0	0	0	20	33rd
2012	MX2	173	KTM	KTM Scott Racing Team UG	29	0	0	0	0	121	21st
2014	MX2	92	KTM	Standing Construct KTM	34	0	0	4	2	449	7th
2015	MX2	92	Yamaha	Standing Construct Yamaha	36	3	3	9	6	511	4th
2016	MXGP	92	Yamaha	Kemea Yamaha Racing Team	36	0	0	1	0	352	9th
2017	MXGP	92	Honda	Team Assomotor Honda	19	0	0	0	0	61	21st
2018	MXGP	92	KTM	Standing Construct KTM	19	0	0	0	0	97	21st
2019	MXGP	13	Honda	KMP Honda Racing	2	0	0	0	0	14	38th
2020	MXGP	92	Honda	Honda SR Motoblouz	32	0	0	0	0	88	24th
2021	MXGP	92	Yamaha	Hostettler Yamaha Racing	26	0	0	0	0	49	29th
2022	MXGP	92	Yamaha	iXS MXGP Team	10	0	0	0	0	100	21st
2023	MXGP	92	Honda	Team Ship to Cycle Honda Motoblouz SR	34	0	0	0	0	363	9th
2024	MXGP	92	Honda	Team Ship to Cycle Honda Motoblouz SR	39	0	0	0	0	388	9th
2025	MXGP	92	Yamaha	Kehrli Motos	9	0	0	0	0	72	24th
Total					335	3	3	14	8	2685	

==== Grand Prix Wins ====
GP wins
Amount of GP-wins	Date	Grand Prix	Place
MX2-class
1	10 May 2015	Spain	Talavera de la Reina
2	24 May 2015	Great Britain	Matterley Basin
3	26 July 2015	Czech Republic	Loket

=== AMA Supercross Championship ===
==== By season ====
Season	Class	Number	Motorcycle	Team	Overall Wins	Overall Podium	Pts	Plcd
2026	250SX East	39	Yamaha	Gizmo Racing Yamaha	0	0	8	29th
Total					0	0	8	

=== AMA National Motocross Championship ===
==== By season ====
Season	Class	Number	Motorcycle	Team	Races	Race Wins	Overall Wins	Race Top-3	Overall Podium	Pts	Plcd
2025	450	992	Yamaha	Gizmo Mods Rock River Yamaha Racing	22	0	0	0	0	201	9th
2026	450	39	Yamaha	Gizmo Racing Yamaha	22	0	0	0	0	101	17th
Total					44	0	0	0	0	302	
