= Benoît Paturel =

French motocross racer

- Nationality: French
- Born: 7 December 1994 (age 31); Lyon, France
- Bike number: 6

Benoît Paturel (born 7 December 1994) is a French professional Motocross racer. Paturel was part of the French team that won the 2016 Motocross des Nations.

Paturel has raced in the FIM Motocross World Championship since making two wildcard appearance's in the MX2 class during the 2012 season. His best season's to date have been 2016 and 2017, where in the former of those he managed to finish third in the final standings in the MX2 class.

Paturel was the winner of the 2017 MXGP of Switzerland in the MX2 class.

During the 2025 season, Paturel competed in the American AMA Motocross Championship after not being able to secure a ride in MXGP.

== Career ==
=== 250 Career ===
Paturel joined the BUD Racing Kawasaki team for the 2012 season to move up to a 250 for the first time. He did not compete full-time in that season's EMX250 championship due to injury, but still managed to finish second overall at the final round.

Paturel would compete in his first full-time MX2 World Championship season in 2015, being signed by the Kemea squad, who were at this point Yamaha's factory team in the MX2 class. He was a consistent top-ten rider early in the season before moving closer to the front of the pack and securing two fourth overalls in Czech Republic and Lombardia. At the penultimate round of the championship in Mexico, Paturel was able to secure both his first race top-three finish and overall Grand Prix podium with third overall. After finishing ninth in the standings, Paturel had his contract with the team extended for a further two seasons. The 2016 FIM Motocross World Championship would see Paturel finish third in the final standings, his highest final finishing position in the MX2 class. He finished the majority of races inside the top-ten and picked up three overall podiums, including second overall in back-to-back Grand Prix in Spain and his native France. Following this, he was a late call-up to ride for the French team at the 2016 Motocross des Nations, following an injury to Dylan Ferrandis. After finishing third in his Saturday qualifying race, Paturel rode well in his two mixed Sunday races, including a tenth in the second race. These, combined with the results of his teammates were enough for France to win the event by a single point.

The 2017 FIM Motocross World Championship would see Paturel continue to make new achievements in the MX2 class. After starting the season with second overall at the opening round, he found more consistency during the middle part of the season, winning his first world championship race win in front of his home fans at the French round. A second race win would come at the Swiss round later in the season, which would also result in him taking his first overall Grand Prix win. He missed the final three rounds of the season due to a lacerated liver obtained during whilst training, resulting in him finishing fifth in the final standings.

=== 450 Career ===
Due to the under-23 age rule in place within the MX2 class of the world championship, Paturel had to move up to the MXGP class for the 2018 FIM Motocross World Championship. After initially signing for the BOS KTM team, Paturel later switched to the Marchetti KTM team, after missing the first three rounds of the season. A back injury as well as illness later in the year meant that he was only able to ride seven rounds of the MXGP series and collect forty points. For the 2019 FIM Motocross World Championship season, Paturel moved to the Gebben Van Venrooy Kawasaki team. Paturel again found injury problems, struggling with knee issues picked up at the Latvian round which were then compounded by being diagnosed with Epstein Barr. Over the five rounds he was able to compete in, he was able to record his first top-ten race finish in the MXGP class.

For the 2020 FIM Motocross World Championship season, Paturel moved teams and manufacturers again, this time joining the JM Honda team. In the COVID-19-hit season, Paturel managed to record a couple more top-ten race finishes before obtaining another injury, this time two fractures in his back. He was able to return for the final two rounds of the season before moving to the Honda SR Motoblouz team ahead of the 2021 season. Paturel had more injury problems which prevented him competing in the opening part of the 2021 MXGP championship but upon his return in the latter half of the season he showed improvement, recording several top-ten finishes including a sixth in the second race at the first Trentino round. Due to the 2021 Motocross des Nations taking place before the end of the MXGP season, Paturel was chosen to compete for the French team after several riders higher in the standings turned down the opportunity. With a best finish of ninth, he helped France finish in fifth overall.

Paturel stayed with the SR Motoblouz team for the 2022 FIM Motocross World Championship. This was another injury troubled season in MXGP for the Frenchman, as he missed the first three rounds due to injury. Further problems as the season went on meant he missed several other rounds resulting in 26th in the final standings. For the 2023 FIM Motocross World Championship, Paturel signed for the new De Baets Yamaha MX Team. The return to riding a Yamaha brought Paturel his best season since moving up to the MXGP class. After only missing one round and posting multiple top-ten finishes, he showed a return to some of the form that had brought him success in the MX2 division. A final championship ranking of eleventh resulted in Paturel remaining with the De Baets squad for the following year, after initially splitting with the team in the immediate period post the season ending.

The 2024 FIM Motocross World Championship saw Paturel finish 16th in the final standings, with three top-ten finishes being the highlight of his season. Due to injury, he missed the last three rounds and after the season. After the De Baets team pulled out of MXGP before the start of the 2025 FIM Motocross World Championship, Paturel was left without a team. With the intention of catching the eye of an American team, he decided to travel to California. Eventually signing for the Twisted Tea Suzuki team, Paturel lined up for the 2025 AMA National Motocross Championship, finishing the opening round in tenth overall before ending up in 15th in the final standings at the end of the season.

After not being able to pick up a ride in either the American or MXGP paddocks for 2026, Paturel competed sporadically throughout the season. He made one MXGP appearance at his home grand prix, standing in at the JK Yamaha squad and scoring three points. Later in the year, he competed at the final round of the Brazilian Motocross Championship.

== Honours ==
Motocross des Nations

- Team Overall: 2016 (France) (gold)

FIM Motocross World Championship

- MX2: 2016 (bronze)

French Elite Motocross Championship

- Elite MX2: 2013 (silver) , 2014 (bronze)

== Career statistics ==
=== Motocross des Nations ===
| Year | Location | Nation | Class | Teammates | Team Overall | Individual Overall |
|---|---|---|---|---|---|---|
| 2016 | (Italy) Maggiora | FRA | MX2 | Romain Febvre; Gautier Paulin | 1st | 4th |
| 2021 | (Italy) Mantua | FRA | MXGP | Tom Vialle; Mathys Boisramé | 5th | 6th |

=== FIM Motocross World Championship ===
==== By season ====
| Season | Class | Number | Motorcycle | Team | Race | Race Wins | Overall Wins | Race Top-3 | Overall Podium | Pts | Plcd |
|---|---|---|---|---|---|---|---|---|---|---|---|
| 2012 | MX2 | 142 | Kawasaki | Rockstar Energy BUD Racing Kawasaki | 4 | 0 | 0 | 0 | 0 | 22 | 32nd |
| 2013 | MX2 | 142 | Husqvarna | Team BUD Racing Factory Husqvarna | 2 | 0 | 0 | 0 | 0 | 1 | 53rd |
| 2015 | MX2 | 6 | Yamaha | Kemea Yamaha Racing Team | 36 | 0 | 0 | 1 | 1 | 376 | 9th |
| 2016 | MX2 | 6 | Yamaha | Kemea Yamaha Racing Team | 36 | 0 | 0 | 6 | 3 | 512 | 3rd |
| 2017 | MX2 | 6 | Yamaha | Kemea Racing Team | 32 | 2 | 1 | 12 | 3 | 504 | 5th |
| 2018 | MXGP | 6 | KTM | Marchetti Racing Team KTM | 11 | 0 | 0 | 0 | 0 | 40 | 27th |
| 2019 | MXGP | 6 | Kawasaki | Team Gebben Van Venrooy Kawasaki Racing | 10 | 0 | 0 | 0 | 0 | 65 | 24th |
| 2020 | MXGP | 6 | Honda | JM Honda Racing | 16 | 0 | 0 | 0 | 0 | 67 | 28th |
| 2021 | MXGP | 16 | Honda | Honda SR Motoblouz | 20 | 0 | 0 | 0 | 0 | 110 | 20th |
| 2022 | MXGP | 16 | Honda | Team Ship to Cycle Honda SR Motoblouz | 16 | 0 | 0 | 0 | 0 | 38 | 26th |
| 2023 | MXGP | 6 | Yamaha | De Baets Yamaha MX Team | 35 | 0 | 0 | 0 | 0 | 277 | 12th |
| 2024 | MXGP | 6 | Yamaha | De Baets Yamaha MX Team | 29 | 0 | 0 | 0 | 0 | 197 | 16th |
| 2026 | MXGP | 6 | Yamaha | JK Racing Yamaha | 2 | 0 | 0 | 0 | 0 | 3 | 57th |
| Total | | | | | 249 | 2 | 1 | 19 | 7 | 2212 | |

==== Grand Prix wins ====
GP wins
| GP-win count | Date | Grand Prix | Place |
MX2-class
| 1 | 13 August 2017 | Switzerland | Frauenfeld |

=== AMA National Motocross Championship ===
==== By season ====
| Season | Class | Number | Motorcycle | Team | Races | Race Wins | Overall Wins | Race Top-3 | Overall Podium | Pts | Plcd |
|---|---|---|---|---|---|---|---|---|---|---|---|
| 2025 | 450 | 102 | Suzuki | Twisted Tea Suzuki Presented by Progressive Insurance | 22 | 0 | 0 | 0 | 0 | 131 | 15th |
| Total | | | | | 22 | 0 | 0 | 0 | 0 | 131 | |
