= Glenn Coldenhoff =

Dutch motorcycle racer

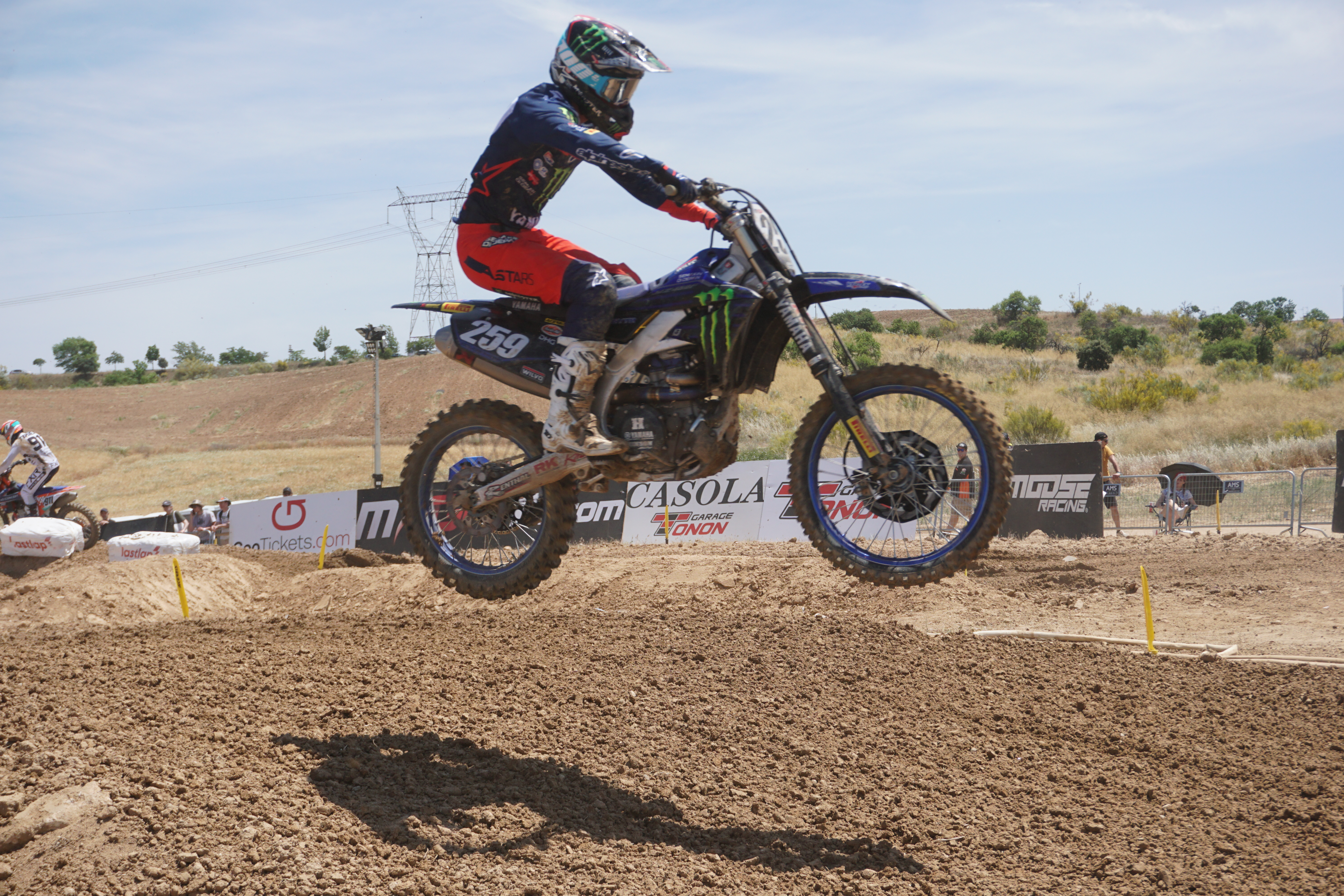
- Coldenhoff in 2022
- Nationality: Dutch
- Born: 13 February 1991 (age 35) Oss, Netherlands

Motocross career
- Years active: 2008-Present
- Teams: •Standing Construct GasGas Factory Racing (2020); •Monster Energy Yamaha Factory MXGP Team (2021-2023); •Factory MXGP Racing Fantic (2023-2025)
- Wins: •MX2: 1; •MXGP: 5

Glenn Coldenhoff (born 13 February 1991) is a Dutch professional motocross racer. He has competed in the Motocross World Championships since 2008. Coldenhoff was a member of the winning Dutch team at the 2019 Motocross des Nations.

== Motocross career ==
Coldenhoff was born in Oss on 13 February 1991. He lives in Heesch, Netherlands.

Coldenhoff in 2015 rode for the Suzuki racing team. He switched to the Red Bull KTM racing team for 2016. He won his first MXGP race on 12 July 2015 in Ķegums, Latvia. In Race 1 he finished first and in Race 2 he came in second after Romain Febvre. In December 2018 Coldenhoff crashed during a training session and broke his wrist and three vertebrae. In 2019 Coldenhoff won 2 rounds of world championships and with team Netherlands the 2019 Motocross des Nations. Their victory marked the first Dutch win in the 73-year history of the Motocross des Nations.

In 2019, Coldenhoff finished third in the 2019 FIM Motocross World Championship. In 2020, he stated he wanted to continue racing for another six years.

For the 2020 FIM Motocross World Championship, Coldenhoff was part of the Gas Gas racing team. In the first round MXGP of Great Britain, Coldenhoff finished sixth two times. On 8 March, he finished seventh overall in the MXGP of The Netherlands, having finished ninth in the first race and seventh in the second race. Due to the COVID-19 pandemic, the schedule of the championship was changed. For the third round the Gas Gas team used new bikes. On 9 August, the MXGP of Latvia was held, in which Coldenhoff finished second in the first race and won the second race, finishing first overall. This was the first ever GP win of Gas Gas. During the MXGP of Riga on 12 August, Coldenhoff finished seventh in the first race but bruised several ribs in the second race and did not finish. He had to drive the third round in Latvia (MXGP of Kegums) on pain killers.

On 16 October 2020 during the qualification for the MXGP of Flanders, Coldenhoff fell and broke two vertebrae. The injury meant the end of the season for Coldenhoff.

Coldenhoff was released by Gas Gas following the 2020 season and signed with Monster Energy Yamaha Factory Facing on a two-year deal, partnering with Jeremy Seewer and Ben Watson and replacing 2015 MXGP champion Romain Febvre, who left for Kawasaki.

== MXGP results ==
Year	Rnd 1	Rnd 2	Rnd 3	Rnd 4	Rnd 5	Rnd 6	Rnd 7	Rnd 8	Rnd 9	Rnd 10	Rnd 11	Rnd 12	Rnd 13	Rnd 14	Rnd 15	Rnd 16	Rnd 17	Rnd 18	Rnd 19	Rnd 20	Average Finish	Podium Percent	Place
2017 MXGP	9	2	18	15	14	9	8	6	9	9	9	11	9	3	13	5	8	10	9	-	9.27	11%	10th
2018 MXGP	10	4	8	5	5	15	7	7	6	6	9	6	17	9	5	4	7	7	4	9	7.50	-	7th
2019 MXGP	19	8	12	9	9	8	5	9	8	7	5	4	10	3	1	1	2	2	-	-	6.78	28%	3rd
2020 MXGP	8	7	1	15	6	7	6	7	2	7	3	4	OUT	OUT	OUT	OUT	OUT	OUT	-	-	6.08	25%	8th
2021 MXGP	17	8	2	12	4	11	12	8	14	9	6	8	13	2	5	7	11	7	-	-	8.67	11%	7th
2022 MXGP	5	17	5	4	5	4	10	3	2	3	9	5	4	3	3	1	6	9	-	-	5.44	33%	5th
2023 MXGP	10	2	15	6	6	5	7	4	2	4	3	5	3	3	9	4	7	8	4	-	5.63	26%	4th
2024 MXGP	7	12	6	7	8	7	11	5	4	6	9	7	7	5	7	4	13	7	6	8	7.30	-	6th
2025 MXGP	5	2	6	2	3	5	6	8	10	10	4	3	4	3	4	5	3	9	8	8	5.40	30%	3rd
