= Arnaud Tonus =

Swiss motorcycle racer

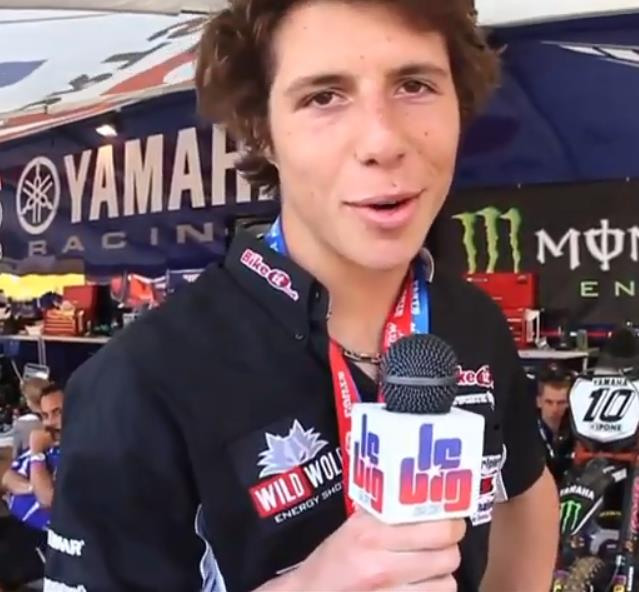
- Tonus in 2012.
- Nationality: Swiss
- Born: 17 June 1991 (age 35) Genève, Switzerland

Motocross career
- Years active: 2010 - present
- Teams: Yamaha
- Championships: 0
- Wins: 1

Arnaud Tonus (born 17 June 1991) is a Swiss professional motocross racer. In 2011 he won the British Motocross Championship in the MX2 class.
