= Jeremy Van Horebeek =

Belgian motorcycle racer

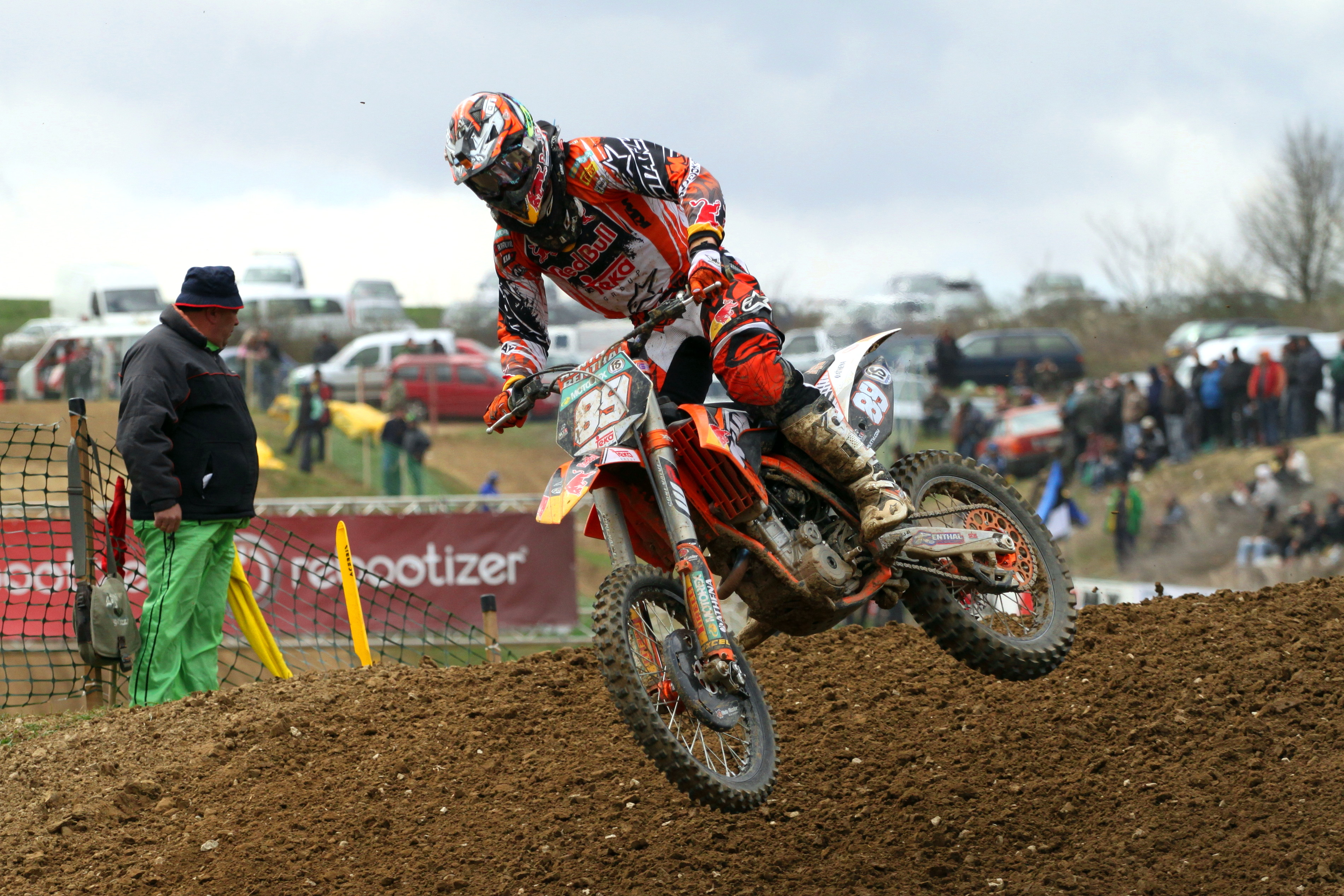
- Van Horebeek in 2011.
- Nationality: Belgian
- Born: 28 November 1989 (age 36) Braine-l'Alleud, Belgium

Motocross career
- Years active: 2005 - 2022
- Teams: Honda, KTM, Kawasaki, Yamaha, Beta
- Championships: 0
- Wins: 2

Jeremy Van Horebeek (born 28 November 1989) is a Belgian professional motocross rider. Van Horebeek began competing in the 2021 MXGP riding the newly introduced Beta 450RX. He placed ninth overall in the COVID-19 delayed season opener in Orlyonok, Russia. He was sevenh in the 2022 MXoN open class.

== Career ==
- 2012 FIM Motocross World Championship MX2 3rd place
- 2013 Motocross des Nations Champion
- 2014 FIM Motocross World Championship MXGP 2nd place
- 2015 FIM Motocross World Championship MXGP 5th place
- 2016 FIM Motocross World Championship MXGP 6th place
- 2017 FIM Motocross World Championship MXGP 7th place
- 2018 FIM Motocross World Championship MXGP 9th place
- 2019 FIM Motocross World Championship MXGP 8th place
- 2020 FIM Motocross World Championship MXGP 9th place
- 2021 Italian International Championship 3rd place
