= Jeremy Seewer =

Swiss motorcycle racer

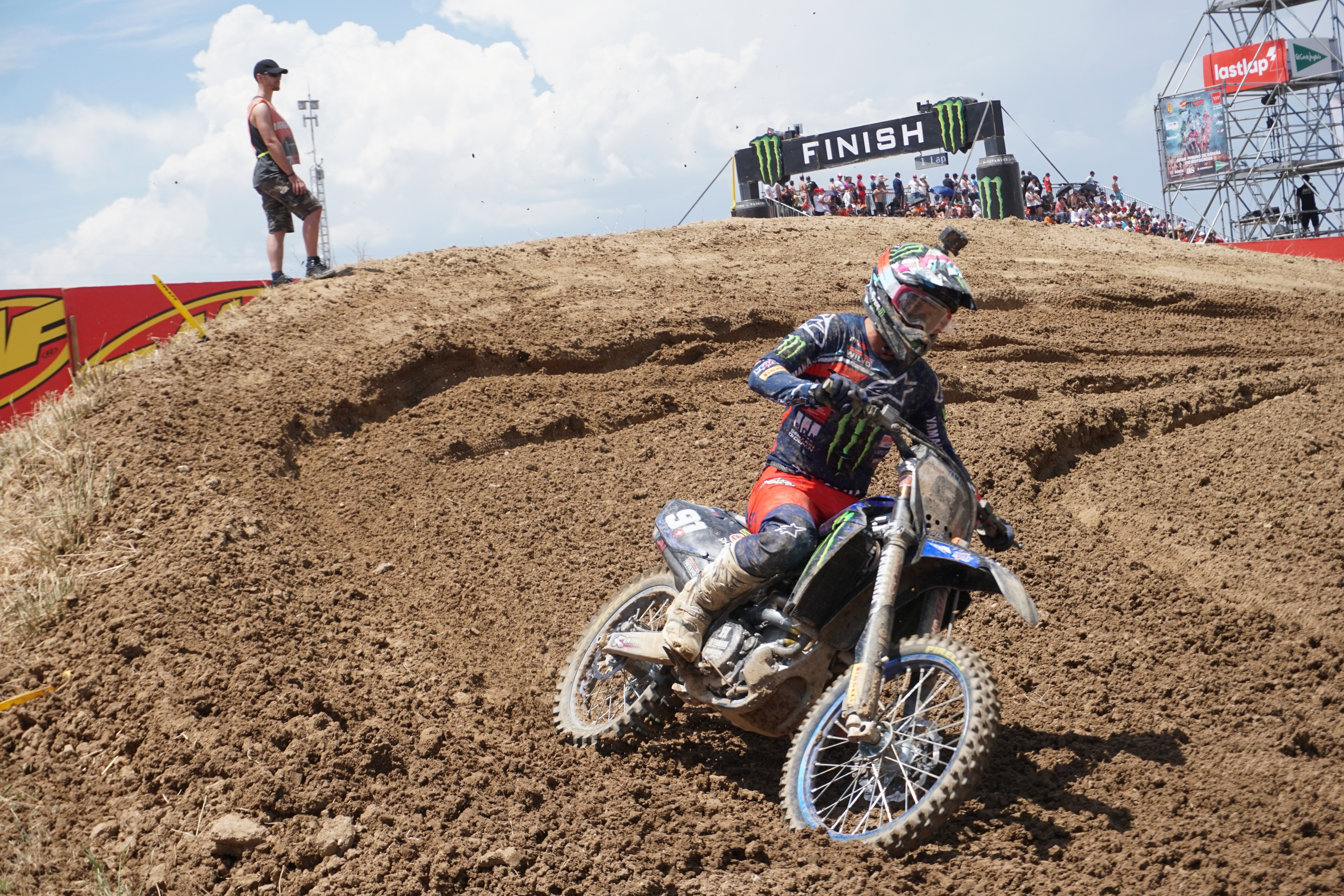
- Seewer in 2022
- Nationality: Swiss
- Born: 18 July 1994 (age 32) Bülach, Switzerland

Motocross career
- Years active: 2012-present
- Teams: •Rockstar Energy Suzuki Europe/Team Suzuki World MX2 (2011-2017); •Monster Energy Yamaha Factory MXGP Team (2018-2023); •MXGP Kawasaki Factory Racing Team (2023-2024); •Ducati Corse Factory Racing MXGP Team (2024-2026); •Van Venrooy KTM Racing (2026-Present)
- Wins: •MXGP: 8; •MX2: 5
- GP debut: 2012, GP of Belgium, MX2
- First GP win: 2017, GP of Indonesia, MX2

Jeremy Seewer (born 18 July, 1994) is a Swiss professional motocross racer, who has competed in the Motocross World Championships since 2012.

== Career ==
Seewer was the Swiss 65cc Motocross Champion in 2005, and in 2008 he was the Swiss 85cc Champion.

Seewer has competed in the Motocross World Championships since 2012, where he has finished second in the MX2 class twice and second in the MXGP class three times.

=== 2023 ===
On Friday September 8, it was announced that Seewer would depart the MXGP Yamaha team after four years, and join the MXGP Kawasaki racing team.

== MXGP Results ==
Year	Rnd 1	Rnd 2	Rnd 3	Rnd 4	Rnd 5	Rnd 6	Rnd 7	Rnd 8	Rnd 9	Rnd 10	Rnd 11	Rnd 12	Rnd 13	Rnd 14	Rnd 15	Rnd 16	Rnd 17	Rnd 18	Rnd 19	Rnd 20	Average Finish	Podium Percent	Place
2015 MX2	7	18	3	6	6	9	6	8	3	6	3	4	8	7	15	5	10	7	-	-	7.28	17%	5th
2016 MX2	4	2	3	2	2	3	3	5	7	3	4	7	2	2	2	14	6	5	-	-	4.22	56%	2nd
2017 MX2	6	1	3	2	6	2	9	1	3	2	1	1	2	4	2	1	4	3	4	-	3.00	68%	2nd
2018 MXGP	14	8	11	9	7	8	10	10	9	8	6	10	11	8	6	10	9	6	10	8	8.90	-	8th
2019 MXGP	9	7	7	10	5	5	7	3	4	5	3	3	3	4	2	4	7	3	-	-	5.06	33%	2nd
2020 MXGP	4	19	4	2	13	2	3	4	1	5	4	7	5	5	3	5	2	4	-	-	5.11	33%	2nd
2021 MXGP	5	7	8	6	3	7	7	6	13	5	5	4	7	5	4	1	5	4	-	-	5.67	11%	4th
2022 MXGP	3	5	10	6	4	8	2	5	8	1	2	9	1	5	1	2	2	2	-	-	4.22	50%	2nd
2023 MXGP	7	6	11	11	5	6	1	5	4	3	4	3	4	4	1	3	8	1	2	-	4.68	37%	3rd
2024 MXGP	6	5	8	5	12	6	6	6	10	3	5	6	5	8	6	6	4	3	17	5	6.60	10%	4th
2025 MXGP	12	14	10	14	15	3	13	11	3	9	17	10	10	6	20	18	20	15	15	12	12.35	10%	10th
2026 MXGP	17 ARG (Argentina)	20 AND (Andalusia)	15 SUI (Switzerland)	25 SAR (Sardinia)	36 TRE	19 FRA (France)	OUT GER (Germany)	OUT LAT (Latvia)	OUT ITA (Italy)	OUT POR (Portugal)	OUT RSA (South Africa)	6 GBR (United Kingdom)	16 CZE (Czech Republic)	17 FLA (Flanders)	26 SWE (Sweden)	OUT NED (Netherlands)	10 TUR (Turkey)	8 CHN (China)	8 AUS (Australia)	-	15.92	-	17th
