= 2021 Motocross des Nations =

2021 motocross race

The 2021 Motocross des Nations is a motocross race to be held on 25 and 26 September 2021 in Mantova, Italy. The race usually takes place after the MXGP season, however because the 2021 GP schedule runs from April through November, the MXoN will take place in the middle of the MXGP series.

== Entry list ==
Start numbers will be allocated based on the team finishes from the 2019 competition. This will allocate number plates 1, 2 & 3 to the Netherlands (1st), 4, 5 & 6 to Belgium (2nd) and 7, 8 & 9 to the United Kingdom (3rd). The remainder of the top ten finishers were as follows: Estonia, France, United States, Germany, Latvia, Spain and Denmark.

The official entry list was published on 14 September.

The impacts of the COVID-19 pandemic that ultimately led to the cancellation of the 2020 event, meant that some of the sport's most important nations were unable to send a team. United States will miss their first MXdN since 2004, whilst Australia will be absent for the first time since 2002. Other nations absent who competed in 2019 included New Zealand, Japan, Puerto Rico, Cyprus and Luxembourg.

In addition to this, many of the sports top riders have decided to opt out of racing for their country due to the event's scheduling putting it in the middle of the 2021 world championship season. Tim Gajser (Slovenia), Romain Febvre & Maxime Renaux (France), Jorge Prado (Spain), Jeremy Seewer (Switzerland), Pauls Jonass (Latvia) and Jago Geerts (Belgium) all decided against competing, whilst Jeremy Van Horebeek (Belgium) withdrew from the event after initially being selected. He will be replaced by Cyril Genot.

Despite these challenges, the entry list features only one less nation than in 2019. A number of nations will return to the event after being absent in previous additions. Venezuela and Canada return for the first time since 2018. Former podium finishers Finland, as well as Slovakia, return for the first time since 2017, whilst Morocco will return to the event for only their third appearance - their last coming in 2015. Bulgaria are scheduled to compete for the first time ever in the event, the first debutant since Kuwait in 2011.

Russian athletes competed as a neutral competitors using the designation MFR (Motorcycle Federation of Russia), as the Court of Arbitration for Sport upheld a ban on Russia competing at World Championships. The ban was implemented by the World Anti-Doping Agency in response to state-sponsored doping program of Russian athletes.

	Country	Nr	Rider	Class	Motorcycle
1	Netherlands	1	Glenn Coldenhoff	MXGP	Yamaha
1	Netherlands	2	Roan van de Moosdijk	MX2	Kawasaki
1	Netherlands	3	Jeffrey Herlings	Open	KTM
2	Belgium	4	Cyril Genot	MXGP	KTM
2	Belgium	5	Liam Everts	MX2	KTM
2	Belgium	6	Brent Van Doninck	Open	Yamaha
3	United Kingdom	7	Ben Watson	MXGP	Yamaha
3	United Kingdom	8	Conrad Mewse	MX2	KTM
3	United Kingdom	9	Shaun Simpson	Open	KTM
4	Estonia	10	Gert Krestinov	MXGP	Honda
4	Estonia	11	Jörgen-Matthias Talviku	MX2	Husqvarna
4	Estonia	12	Harri Kullas	Open	Yamaha
5	France	13	Benoît Paturel	MXGP	Honda
5	France	14	Tom Vialle	MX2	KTM
5	France	15	Mathys Boisramé	Open	Kawasaki
6	Germany	19	Max Nagl	MXGP	Husqvarna
6	Germany	20	Simon Längenfelder	MX2	Gas Gas
6	Germany	21	Henry Jacobi	Open	Honda
7	Latvia	22	Kārlis Sabulis	MXGP	Husqvarna
7	Latvia	23	Mairis Pumpurs	MX2	Yamaha
7	Latvia	24	Toms Macuks	Open	Gas Gas
8	Spain	25	José Butrón	MXGP	KTM
8	Spain	26	Yago Martínez	MX2	KTM
8	Spain	27	Ander Valentín	Open	Husqvarna
9	Denmark	28	Thomas Kjær Olsen	MXGP	Husqvarna
9	Denmark	29	Mikkel Haarup	MX2	Kawasaki
9	Denmark	30	Bastian Bøgh Damm	Open	KTM
10	Switzerland	31	Arnaud Tonus	MXGP	Yamaha
10	Switzerland	32	Mike Gwerder	MX2	KTM
10	Switzerland	33	Valentin Guillod	Open	Yamaha
11	Norway	34	Håkon Fredriksen	MXGP	Yamaha
11	Norway	35	Kevin Horgmo	MX2	Gas Gas
11	Norway	36	Sander Agard-Michelsen	Open	Yamaha
12	Slovenia	37	Luka Kutnar	MXGP	KTM
12	Slovenia	38	Jan Pancar	MX2	KTM
12	Slovenia	39	Peter Irt	Open	Yamaha
13	Sweden	40	Alvin Östlund	MXGP	Yamaha
13	Sweden	41	Isak Gifting	MX2	Gas Gas
13	Sweden	42	Ken Bengtson	Open	Husqvarna
14	Italy	46	Tony Cairoli	MXGP	KTM
14	Italy	47	Mattia Guadagnini	MX2	KTM
14	Italy	48	Alessandro Lupino	Open	KTM
15	Austria	49	Michael Sandner	MXGP	KTM
15	Austria	50	Rene Hofer	MX2	KTM
15	Austria	51	Marcel Stauffer	Open	KTM
16	(Republic of Ireland) Ireland	52	Jason Meara	MXGP	Kawasaki
16	(Republic of Ireland) Ireland	53	Jake Sheridan	MX2	KTM
16	(Republic of Ireland) Ireland	54	Stuart Edmonds	Open	Husqvarna
17	South Africa	58	David Goosen	MXGP	Husqvarna
17	South Africa	59	Camden McLellan	MX2	Husqvarna
17	South Africa	60	Tristan Purdon	Open	KTM
18	Poland	61	Tomasz Wysocki	MXGP	KTM
18	Poland	62	Gabriel Chętnicki	MX2	Suzuki
18	Poland	63	Jakub Barczewski	Open	KTM
19	Portugal	64	Hugo Basaula	MXGP	Kawasaki
19	Portugal	65	Luis Outeiro	MX2	TM
19	Portugal	66	Marco Silva	Open	KTM
20	Ukraine	67	Dmytro Asmanov	MXGP	KTM
20	Ukraine	68	Maksym Kyenko	MX2	Yamaha
20	Ukraine	69	Semen Nerush	Open	KTM
21	Brazil	70	Gabriel Gutierres	MXGP	Yamaha
21	Brazil	71	Enzo Lopes	MX2	Honda
21	Brazil	72	Frederico Spagnol	Open	KTM
22	MFR	73	Vsevolod Brylyakov	MXGP	Honda
22	MFR	74	Timur Petrashin	MX2	KTM
22	MFR	75	Evgeny Bobryshev	Open	Husqvarna
23	Czech Republic	76	Dušan Drdaj	MXGP	KTM
23	Czech Republic	77	Jan Wagenknecht	MX2	KTM
23	Czech Republic	78	Petr Polák	Open	Yamaha
24	Iceland	79	Eyþór Reynisson	MXGP	Yamaha
24	Iceland	80	Eiður Orri Pállmarsson	MX2	Yamaha
24	Iceland	81	Máni Freyr Pétursson	Open	KTM
25	Lithuania	82	Dovydas Karka	MXGP	Yamaha
25	Lithuania	83	Erlandas Mackonis	MX2	KTM
25	Lithuania	84	Arminas Jasikonis	Open	Husqvarna
26	Croatia	88	Luka Crnkovic	MXGP	Honda
26	Croatia	89	Marko Tumbri	MX2	KTM
26	Croatia	90	Matej Jaros	Open	Kawasaki
27	Greece	91	Dimitrios Bakas	MXGP	Yamaha
27	Greece	92	Antonis Sagmalis	MX2	Yamaha
27	Greece	93	Panagiotis Papilas	Open	Honda
28	Finland	103	Miro Sihvonen	MXGP	Honda
28	Finland	104	Emil Weckman	MX2	Honda
28	Finland	105	Jere Haavisto	Open	Kawasaki
29	Venezuela	106	Carlos Badiali	MXGP	KTM
29	Venezuela	107	Lorenzo Locurcio	MX2	KTM
29	Venezuela	108	Raimundo Trasolini	Open	KTM
30	Canada	109	Dylan Wright	MXGP	Honda
30	Canada	110	Jacob Piccolo	MX2	KTM
30	Canada	111	Tyler Medaglia	Open	Gas Gas
31	Morocco	112	Amine Aït Bella	MXGP	KTM
31	Morocco	113	Saad Soulimani	MX2	KTM
31	Morocco	114	Abdelhalim Soulimani	Open	Husqvarna
32	Slovakia	115	Pavol Repčák	MXGP	KTM
32	Slovakia	116	Tomás Kohút	MX2	KTM
32	Slovakia	117	Šimon Jošt	Open	KTM
33	Bulgaria	118	Michael Ivanov	MXGP	Husqvarna
33	Bulgaria	119	Nikolay Malinov	MX2	KTM
33	Bulgaria	120	Petar Petrov	Open	Honda

== Practice ==
Practice is run on a class by class basis.

=== MXGP ===
Place	Nr	Rider	Motorcycle	Time	Difference
1	46	(Italy) Cairoli	KTM	1:50.052	
2	1	(Netherlands) Coldenhoff	Yamaha	1:50.097	+0.045
3	109	(Canada) Wright	Honda	1:51.576	+1.524
4	28	(Denmark) Kjær Olsen	Husqvarna	1:51.770	+1.718
5	25	(Spain) Butrón	KTM	1:51.829	+1.777
6	31	(Switzerland) Tonus	Yamaha	1:52.245	+2.193
7	13	(France) Paturel	Honda	1:52.343	+2.291
8	40	(Sweden) Östlund	Yamaha	1:52.607	+2.555
9	19	(Germany) Nagl	Husqvarna	1:53.109	+3.057
10	22	(Latvia) Sabulis	Husqvarna	1:53.166	+3.114
11	7	(United Kingdom) Watson	Yamaha	1:53.337	+3.285
12	10	(Estonia) Krestinov	Honda	1:53.339	+3.287
13	4	(Belgium) Genot	KTM	1:54.025	+3.973
14	73	Brylyakov	Honda	1:54.162	+4.110
15	76	(Czech Republic) Drdaj	KTM	1:54.820	+4.768
16	49	(Austria) Sandner	KTM	1:54.824	+4.772
17	61	(Poland) Wysocki	KTM	1:55.151	+5.099
18	118	(Bulgaria) Ivanov	Husqvarna	1:55.469	+5.417
19	103	(Finland) Sihvonen	Honda	1:55.705	+5.653
20	58	(South Africa) Goosen	Husqvarna	1:56.135	+6.083
21	82	(Lithuania) Karka	Yamaha	1:56.410	+6.358
22	79	(Iceland) Reynisson	Yamaha	1:56.557	+6.505
23	67	(Ukraine) Asmanov	KTM	1:56.913	+6.861
24	52	(Republic of Ireland) Meara	Kawasaki	1:57.731	+7.679
25	37	(Slovenia) Kutnar	KTM	1:58.209	+8.157
26	106	(Venezuela) Badiali	KTM	1:58.981	+8.929
27	88	(Croatia) Crnkovic	Honda	2:00.092	+10.040
28	115	(Slovakia) Repčák	KTM	2:00.136	+10.084
29	64	(Portugal) Silva	KTM	2:03.079	+13.027
30	91	(Greece) Bakas	Yamaha	2:12.396	+22.344
	112	(Morocco) Aït Bella	KTM	DNS	

=== MX2 ===
Place	Nr	Rider	Motorcycle	Time	Difference
1	47	(Italy) Guadagnini	KTM	1:50.510	
2	2	(Netherlands) van de Moosdijk	Kawasaki	1:50.808	+0.298
3	14	(France) Vialle	KTM	1:50.811	+0.301
4	8	(United Kingdom) Mewse	KTM	1:51.042	+0.532
5	50	(Austria) Hofer	KTM	1:52.785	+2.275
6	29	(Denmark) Haarup	Kawasaki	1:52.788	+2.278
7	41	(Sweden) Gifting	Gas Gas	1:52.872	+2.362
8	20	(Germany) Längenfelder	Gas Gas	1:53.504	+2.994
9	74	Petrashin	KTM	1:54.361	+3.851
10	32	(Switzerland) Gwerder	KTM	1:54.610	+4.100
11	38	(Slovenia) Pancar	KTM	1:54.702	+4.192
12	65	(Portugal) Outeiro	TM	1:54.821	+4.311
13	26	(Spain) Martínez	KTM	1:54.972	+4.462
14	110	(Canada) Piccolo	KTM	1:55.353	+4.833
15	59	(South Africa) McLellan	Husqvarna	1:55.373	+4.863
16	113	(Morocco) Soulimani	KTM	1:55.417	+4.907
17	5	(Belgium) Everts	KTM	1:55.608	+5.098
18	77	(Czech Republic) Wagenknecht	KTM	1:55.610	+5.100
19	11	(Estonia) Talviku	Husqvarna	1:55.783	+5.273
20	116	(Slovakia) Kohút	KTM	1:56.183	+5.673
21	104	(Finland) Weckman	Honda	1:56.366	+5.856
22	62	(Poland) Chętnicki	Suzuki	1:56.526	+6.016
23	83	(Lithuania) Mackonis	KTM	1:57.823	+7.313
24	23	(Latvia) Pumpurs	Yamaha	1:58.099	+7.589
25	53	(Republic of Ireland) Sheridan	KTM	1:58.210	+7.700
26	119	(Bulgaria) Malinov	KTM	1:58.267	+7.757
27	92	(Greece) Sagmalis	Yamaha	2:01.843	+11.333
28	107	(Venezuela) Locurcio	KTM	2:02.760	+12.250
29	89	(Croatia) Tumbri	KTM	2:03.043	+12.533
30	80	(Iceland) Pálmarsson	Yamaha	2:03.758	+13.248
31	68	(Ukraine) Kyenko	Yamaha	2:06.032	+15.522

=== Open ===
Place	Nr	Rider	Motorcycle	Time	Difference
1	3	(Netherlands) Herlings	KTM	1:48.109	
2	75	Bobryshev	Husqvarna	1:51.327	+3.218
3	48	(Italy) Lupino	KTM	1:51.446	+3.337
4	84	(Lithuania) Jasikonis	Husqvarna	1:51.562	+3.453
5	15	(France) Boisramé	Kawasaki	1:51.649	+3.540
6	33	(Switzerland) Guillod	Yamaha	1:51.752	+3.643
7	12	(Estonia) Kullas	Yamaha	1:52.293	+4.184
8	9	(United Kingdom) Simpson	KTM	1:52.668	+4.559
9	30	(Denmark) Bøgh Damm	KTM	1:52.739	+4.630
10	6	(Belgium) Van Doninck	Yamaha	1:52.755	+4.646
11	117	(Slovakia) Jošt	KTM	1:53.310	+5.201
12	21	(Germany) Jacobi	Honda	1:53.650	+5.541
13	27	(Spain) Valentín	Husqvarna	1:53.666	+5.557
14	42	(Sweden) Bengtson	Husqvarna	1:54.115	+6.006
15	120	(Bulgaria) Petrov	Honda	1:54.146	+6.037
16	51	(Austria) Stauffer	KTM	1:54.467	+6.358
17	78	(Czech Republic) Polák	Yamaha	1:54.570	+6.461
18	105	(Finland) Haavisto	Kawasaki	1:54.803	+6.694
19	24	(Latvia) Macuks	Gas Gas	1:55.216	+7.107
20	111	(Canada) Medaglia	Gas Gas	1:55.431	+7.322
21	54	(Republic of Ireland) Edmonds	Husqvarna	1:55.638	+7.529
22	66	(Portugal) Basaúla	Kawasaki	1:55.968	+7.859
23	60	(South Africa) Purdon	KTM	1:56.580	+8.471
24	108	(Venezuela) Trasolini	KTM	1:57.097	+8.988
25	39	(Slovenia) Irt	Husqvarna	1:57.764	+9.655
26	90	(Croatia) Jaros	Kawasaki	1:59.710	+11.601
27	63	(Poland) Barczewski	KTM	1:59.882	+11.773
28	69	(Ukraine) Nerush	KTM	2:01.686	+13.577
29	81	(Iceland) Pétursson	KTM	2:03.078	+14.969
30	93	(Greece) Papilas	Honda	2:03.499	+15.390
31	114	(Morocco) Soulimani	Husqvarna	2:04.152	+16.043

== Qualifying Races ==
Qualifying is run on a class by class basis. Top 19 countries after qualifying go directly to the main Motocross des Nations races. The remaining countries go to a smaller final. Best 2 scores count.

=== MXGP ===
Place	Nr	Rider	Motorcycle	Laps	Gap
1	46	(Italy) Cairoli	KTM	12	
2	7	(United Kingdom) Watson	Yamaha	12	+2.327
3	1	(Netherlands) Coldenhoff	Yamaha	12	+6.736
4	13	(France) Paturel	Honda	12	+9.469
5	19	(Germany) Nagl	Husqvarna	12	+13.129
6	109	(Canada) Wright	Honda	12	+19.612
7	28	(Denmark) Kjær Olsen	Husqvarna	12	+25.170
8	22	(Latvia) Sabulis	Husqvarna	12	+32.715
9	10	(Estonia) Krestinov	Honda	12	+36.135
10	31	(Switzerland) Tonus	Yamaha	12	+37.813
11	25	(Spain) Butrón	KTM	12	+43.385
12	73	Brylyakov	Honda	12	+44.947
13	4	(Belgium) Genot	KTM	12	+46.900
14	61	(Poland) Wysocki	KTM	12	+58.106
15	49	(Austria) Sandner	KTM	12	+1:05.330
16	76	(Czech Republic) Drdaj	KTM	12	+1:07.880
17	118	(Bulgaria) Ivanov	Husqvarna	12	+1:14.732
18	103	(Finland) Sihvonen	Honda	12	+1:16.267
19	52	(Republic of Ireland) Meara	Kawasaki	12	+1:17.456
20	58	(South Africa) Goosen	Husqvarna	12	+1:20.545
21	79	(Iceland) Reynisson	Yamaha	12	+1:36.099
22	67	(Ukraine) Asmanov	KTM	12	+1:41.807
23	82	(Lithuania) Karka	Yamaha	12	+1:46.371
24	88	(Croatia) Crnkovic	Honda	12	+1:53.128
25	115	(Slovakia) Repčák	KTM	12	+2:02.983
26	37	(Slovenia) Kutnar	KTM	11	+1 Lap
27	106	(Venezuela) Badiali	KTM	11	+1 Lap
28	91	(Greece) Bakas	Yamaha	11	+1 Lap
29	64	(Portugal) Silva	KTM	0	Did not finish
	40	(Sweden) Östlund	Yamaha		Did not start
	112	(Morocco) Aït Bella	KTM		Did not start

=== MX2 ===
Place	Nr	Rider	Motorcycle	Laps	Gap
1	14	(France) Vialle	KTM	12	
2	50	(Austria) Hofer	KTM	12	+3.939
3	8	(United Kingdom) Mewse	KTM	12	+5.213
4	47	(Italy) Guadagnini	KTM	12	+23.849
5	41	(Sweden) Gifting	Gas Gas	12	+25.253
6	59	(South Africa) McLellan	Husqvarna	12	+25.916
7	20	(Germany) Längenfelder	Gas Gas	12	+30.741
8	29	(Denmark) Haarup	Kawasaki	12	+31.539
9	2	(Netherlands) van de Moosdijk	Kawasaki	12	+33.129
10	110	(Canada) Piccolo	KTM	12	+44.321
11	5	(Belgium) Everts	KTM	12	+55.532
12	11	(Estonia) Talviku	Husqvarna	12	+1:02.350
13	65	(Portugal) Outeiro	TM	12	+1:04.153
14	38	(Slovenia) Pancar	KTM	12	+1:05.252
15	32	(Switzerland) Gwerder	KTM	12	+1:07.705
16	23	(Latvia) Pumpurs	Yamaha	12	+1:15.117
17	116	(Slovakia) Kohút	KTM	12	+1:20.426
18	77	(Czech Republic) Wagenknecht	KTM	12	+1:31.608
19	74	Petrashin	KTM	12	+1:34.838
20	107	(Venezuela) Locurcio	KTM	12	+1:35.982
21	104	(Finland) Weckman	Honda	12	+1:39.137
22	26	(Spain) Martínez	KTM	12	+1:50.571
23	53	(Republic of Ireland) Sheridan	KTM	12	+1:52.673
24	62	(Poland) Chetnicki	Suzuki	12	+2:01.781
25	119	(Bulgaria) Malinov	KTM	12	+2:07.010
26	83	(Lithuania) Mackonis	KTM	12	+2:13.702
27	113	(Morocco) Soulimani	KTM	11	+1 Lap
28	92	(Greece) Sagmalis	Yamaha	11	+1 Lap
29	89	(Croatia) Tumbri	KTM	11	+1 Lap
30	80	(Iceland) Pálmarsson	Yamaha	11	+1 Lap
31	68	(Ukraine) Kyenko	Yamaha	11	+1 Lap

=== Open ===
Place	Nr	Rider	Motorcycle	Laps	Gap
1	3	(Netherlands) Herlings	KTM	12	
2	21	(Germany) Jacobi	Honda	12	+6.522
3	84	(Lithuania) Jasikonis	Husqvarna	12	+7.953
4	15	(France) Boisramé	Kawasaki	12	+12.664
5	24	(Latvia) Macuks	Gas Gas	12	+14.556
6	75	Bobryshev	Husqvarna	12	+24.507
7	30	(Denmark) Bøgh Damm	KTM	12	+28.139
8	48	(Italy) Lupino	KTM	12	+36.626
9	27	(Spain) Valentín	Husqvarna	12	+42.526
10	33	(Switzerland) Guillod	Yamaha	12	+42.883
11	12	(Estonia) Kullas	Yamaha	12	+44.683
12	120	(Bulgaria) Petrov	Honda	12	+49.871
13	42	(Sweden) Bengtson	Husqvarna	12	+50.708
14	6	(Belgium) Van Doninck	Yamaha	12	+54.088
15	78	(Czech Republic) Polák	Yamaha	12	+1:07.158
16	54	(Republic of Ireland) Edmonds	Husqvarna	12	+1:13.128
17	111	(Canada) Medaglia	Gas Gas	12	+1:14.913
18	66	(Portugal) Basaúla	Kawasaki	12	+1:19.078
19	117	(Slovakia) Jošt	KTM	12	+1:21.443
20	9	(United Kingdom) Simpson	KTM	12	+1:29.197
21	105	(Finland) Haavisto	Kawasaki	12	+1:33.434
22	60	(South Africa) Purdon	KTM	12	+1:58.017
23	39	(Slovenia) Irt	Husqvarna	12	+2:05.707
24	90	(Croatia) Jaros	Kawasaki	11	+1 Lap
25	108	(Venezuela) Trasolini	KTM	11	+1 Lap
26	63	(Poland) Barczewski	KTM	11	+1 Lap
27	81	(Iceland) Pétursson	KTM	11	+1 Lap
28	93	(Greece) Papilas	Honda	11	+1 Lap
29	114	(Morocco) Soulimani	Husqvarna	11	+1 Lap
30	51	(Austria) Stauffer	KTM	11	+1 Lap
31	69	(Ukraine) Nerush	KTM	8	Did not finish

=== Qualification Standings ===
- Qualified Nations

Place	Nation	Points
1	Netherlands	4
2	France	5
3	Italy	5
4	(United Kingdom) Great Britain	5
5	Germany	7
6	Latvia	13
7	Denmark	14
8	Canada	16
9	Austria	17
10	MFR	18
11	Sweden	18
12	Estonia	20
13	Switzerland	20
14	Spain	20
15	Belgium	24
16	South Africa	26
17	Lithuania	26
18	Bulgaria	29
19	Czech Republic	31

- Nations Admitted to the B-Final

Place	Nation	Points
20	Portugal	31
21	(Republic of Ireland) Ireland	35
22	Slovakia	36
23	Slovenia	37
24	Poland	38
25	Finland	39
26	Venezuela	45
27	Croatia	48
28	Iceland	48
29	Ukraine	53
30	Greece	56
31	Morocco	56

== B-Final ==
The B-Final is for the nations who finished 20th-31st in qualifying. The top nation from the B-Final qualify for the Motocross des Nations races. Best 2 scores for each nation counts.

=== Race ===
Place	Nr	Rider	Motorcycle	Laps	Gap
1	103	(Finland) Sihvonen	Honda	12	
2	52	(Republic of Ireland) Meara	Kawasaki	12	+0.861
3	107	(Venezuela) Locurcio	KTM	12	+15.552
4	61	(Poland) Wysocki	KTM	12	+21.353
5	62	(Poland) Chetnicki	Suzuki	12	+28.007
6	38	(Slovenia) Pancar	KTM	12	+28.961
7	116	(Slovakia) Kohút	KTM	12	+30.540
8	104	(Finland) Weckman	Honda	12	+31.428
9	54	(Republic of Ireland) Edmonds	Husqvarna	12	+32.178
10	108	(Venezuela) Trasolini	KTM	12	+41.768
11	39	(Slovenia) Irt	Husqvarna	12	+42.127
12	65	(Portugal) Outeiro	TM	12	+42.669
13	117	(Slovakia) Jošt	KTM	12	+49.356
14	105	(Finland) Haavisto	Kawasaki	12	+59.856
15	88	(Croatia) Crnkovic	Honda	12	+1:03.526
16	63	(Poland) Barczewski	KTM	12	+1:05.980
17	106	(Venezuela) Badiali	KTM	12	+1:11.323
18	115	(Slovakia) Repčák	KTM	12	+1:12.557
19	67	(Ukraine) Asmanov	KTM	12	+1:13.183
20	53	(Republic of Ireland) Sheridan	KTM	12	+1:15.857
21	90	(Croatia) Jaros	Kawasaki	12	+1:29.185
22	79	(Iceland) Reynisson	Yamaha	12	+1:33.890
23	69	(Ukraine) Nerush	KTM	12	+1:39.236
24	89	(Croatia) Tumbri	KTM	12	+1:44.921
25	81	(Iceland) Pétursson	KTM	12	+1:46.811
26	66	(Portugal) Basaúla	Kawasaki	12	+1:47.179
27	93	(Greece) Papilas	Honda	12	+1:59.059
28	68	(Ukraine) Kyenko	Yamaha	12	+2:01.224
29	92	(Greece) Sagmalis	Yamaha	11	+1 Lap
30	80	(Iceland) Pálmarsson	Yamaha	11	+1 Lap
31	114	(Morocco) A. Soulimani	Husqvarna	11	+1 Lap
32	91	(Greece) Bakas	Yamaha	11	+1 Lap
33	37	(Slovenia) Kutnar	KTM	6	Did not finish
34	64	(Portugal) Silva	KTM	1	Did not finish
	113	(Morocco) S. Soulimani	KTM	0	Did not start
	112	(Morocco) Aït Bella	KTM	0	Did not start
Place	Nr	Rider	Motorcycle	Laps	Gap

=== B-Final Standings ===
- Finland qualify for the Motocross des Nations races.

Place	Nation	Points
1	Finland	9
2	Poland	9
3	(Republic of Ireland) Ireland	11
4	Venezuela	13
5	Slovenia	17
6	Slovakia	20
7	Croatia	36
8	Portugal	38
9	Ukraine	42
10	Iceland	47
11	Greece	56
12	Morocco	31
Place	Nation	Points

== Motocross des Nations races ==
The main Motocross des Nations races consist of 3 races which combine two classes together in each. Lowest score wins with each nation allowed to drop their worst score after the final race.

=== MXGP+MX2 ===
Place	Nr	Rider	Motorcycle	Laps	Gap
1	28	(Denmark) Kjær Olsen	Husqvarna	17	
2	14	(France) Vialle	KTM	17	+1.476
3	7	(United Kingdom) Watson	Yamaha	17	+4.751
4	31	(Switzerland) Tonus	Yamaha	17	+33.115
5	47	(Italy) Guadagnini	KTM	17	+33.789
6	4	(Belgium) Genot	KTM	17	+41.608
7	73	Brylyakov	Honda	17	+42.832
8	50	(Austria) Hofer	KTM	17	+47.009
9	13	(France) Paturel	Honda	17	+52.042
10	22	(Latvia) Sabulis	Husqvarna	17	+1:07.752
11	109	(Canada) Wright	Honda	17	+1:15.204
12	25	(Spain) Butrón	KTM	17	+1:17.064
13	10	(Estonia) Krestinov	Honda	17	+1:18.233
14	41	(Sweden) Gifting	Gas Gas	17	+1:20.182
15	1	(Netherlands) Coldenhoff	Yamaha	17	+1:21.457
16	20	(Germany) Längenfelder	Gas Gas	17	+1:21.852
17	5	(Belgium) Everts	KTM	17	+1:23.188
18	2	(Netherlands) van de Moosdijk	Kawasaki	17	+1:25.350
19	74	Petrashin	KTM	17	+1:51.284
20	103	(Finland) Sihvonen	Honda	17	+1:57.141
21	46	(Italy) Cairoli	KTM	17	+2:00.992
22	8	(United Kingdom) Mewse	KTM	17	+2:02.001
23	11	(Estonia) Talviku	Husqvarna	17	+2:04.891
24	110	(Canada) Piccolo	KTM	17	+2:06.042
25	49	(Austria) Sandner	KTM	17	+2:09.206
26	29	(Denmark) Haarup	Kawasaki	17	+2:10.030
27	82	(Lithuania) Karka	Yamaha	17	+2:18.098
28	59	(South Africa) McLellan	Husqvarna	16	+1 Lap
29	23	(Latvia) Pumpurs	Yamaha	16	+1 Lap
30	32	(Switzerland) Gwerder	KTM	16	+1 Lap
31	118	(Bulgaria) Ivanov	Husqvarna	16	+1 Lap
32	104	(Finland) Weckman	Honda	16	+1 Lap
33	76	(Czech Republic) Drdaj	KTM	16	+1 Lap
34	77	(Czech Republic) Wagenknecht	KTM	16	+1 Lap
35	26	(Spain) Martínez	KTM	16	+1 Lap
36	83	(Lithuania) Mackonis	KTM	16	+1 Lap
37	119	(Bulgaria) Malinov	KTM	16	+1 Lap
38	19	(Germany) Nagl	Husqvarna	3	Did not finish
	58	(South Africa) Goosen	Husqvarna	0	Did not start
	40	(Sweden) Östlund	Yamaha	0	Did not start
Place	Nr	Rider	Motorcycle	Laps	Gap

=== Nations standings after Race 1 ===
Place	Nation	Points
1	France	11
2	Belgium	23
3	(United Kingdom) Great Britain	25
4	Italy	26
5	MFR	26
6	Denmark	27
7	Austria	33
8	Netherlands	33
9	Switzerland	34
10	Canada	35
11	Estonia	36
12	Latvia	39
13	Spain	47
14	Finland	52
15	Germany	54
16	Lithuania	63
17	Czech Republic	67
18	Bulgaria	68
19	Sweden	14
20	South Africa	28
Place	Nation	Points

=== MX2+Open ===
Place	Nr	Rider	Motorcycle	Laps	Gap
1	3	(Netherlands) Herlings	KTM	16	
2	33	(Switzerland) Guillod	Yamaha	16	+49.117
3	50	(Austria) Hofer	KTM	16	+50.463
4	6	(Belgium) Van Doninck	Yamaha	16	+59.303
5	21	(Germany) Jacobi	Honda	16	+1:09.370
6	47	(Italy) Guadagnini	KTM	16	+1:19.682
7	48	(Italy) Lupino	KTM	16	+1:22.312
8	41	(Sweden) Gifting	Gas Gas	16	+1:23.152
9	84	(Lithuania) Jasikonis	Husqvarna	16	+1:45.469
10	75	Bobryshev	Husqvarna	16	+1:56.140
11	12	(Estonia) Kullas	Yamaha	16	+2:04.274
12	9	(United Kingdom) Simpson	KTM	16	+2:06.108
13	5	(Belgium) Everts	KTM	16	+2:06.991
14	8	(United Kingdom) Mewse	KTM	16	+2:08.860
15	74	Petrashin	KTM	16	+2:12.861
16	42	(Sweden) Bengtson	Husqvarna	16	+2:15.912
17	29	(Denmark) Haarup	Kawasaki	16	+2:17.333
18	78	(Czech Republic) Polák	Yamaha	15	+1 Lap
19	15	(France) Boisramé	Kawasaki	15	+1 Lap
20	2	(Netherlands) van de Moosdijk	Kawasaki	15	+1 Lap
21	104	(Finland) Weckman	Honda	15	+1 Lap
22	27	(Spain) Valentín	Husqvarna	15	+1 Lap
23	110	(Canada) Piccolo	KTM	15	+1 Lap
24	20	(Germany) Längenfelder	Gas Gas	15	+1 Lap
25	51	(Austria) Stauffer	KTM	15	+1 Lap
26	77	(Czech Republic) Wagenknecht	KTM	15	+1 Lap
27	11	(Estonia) Talviku	Husqvarna	15	+1 Lap
28	23	(Latvia) Pumpurs	Yamaha	15	+1 Lap
29	111	(Canada) Medaglia	Gas Gas	15	+1 Lap
30	32	(Switzerland) Gwerder	KTM	15	+1 Lap
31	105	(Finland) Haavisto	Kawasaki	15	+1 Lap
32	83	(Lithuania) Mackonis	KTM	15	+1 Lap
33	30	(Denmark) Bøgh Damm	KTM	14	Did not finish
34	60	(South Africa) Purdon	KTM	14	+2 Laps
35	119	(Bulgaria) Malinov	KTM	14	+2 Laps
36	120	(Bulgaria) Petrov	Honda	13	Did not finish
37	26	(Spain) Martínez	KTM	8	Did not finish
38	14	(France) Vialle	KTM	2	Did not finish
39	24	(Latvia) Macuks	Gas Gas	0	Did not finish
40	59	(South Africa) McLellan	Husqvarna	0	Did not finish
Place	Nr	Rider	Motorcycle	Laps	Gap

=== Nations standings after Race 2 ===
Place	Nation	Points
1	Italy	39
2	Belgium	40
3	(United Kingdom) Great Britain	51
4	MFR	51
5	Netherlands	54
6	Austria	61
7	Switzerland	66
8	France	68
9	Estonia	74
10	Denmark	77
11	Germany	83
12	Canada	87
13	Lithuania	104
14	Finland	104
15	Latvia	106
16	Spain	106
17	Czech Republic	111
18	Bulgaria	139
19	Sweden	38
20	South Africa	102
Place	Nation	Points

=== MXGP+Open ===
Place	Nr	Rider	Motorcycle	Laps	Gap
1	3	(Netherlands) Herlings	KTM	17	
2	46	(Italy) Cairoli	KTM	17	+55.480
3	1	(Netherlands) Coldenhoff	Yamaha	17	+1:03.943
4	7	(United Kingdom) Watson	Yamaha	17	+1:07.886
5	75	Bobryshev	Husqvarna	17	+1:44.958
6	9	(United Kingdom) Simpson	KTM	17	+1:51.152
7	73	Brylyakov	Honda	17	+1:57.546
8	22	(Latvia) Sabulis	Husqvarna	17	+1:59.052
9	15	(France) Boisramé	Kawasaki	17	+2:03.104
10	42	(Sweden) Bengtson	Husqvarna	17	+2:04.321
11	13	(France) Paturel	Honda	17	+2:05.907
12	105	(Finland) Haavisto	Kawasaki	16	+1 Lap
13	28	(Denmark) Kjær Olsen	Husqvarna	16	+1 Lap
14	84	(Lithuania) Jasikonis	Husqvarna	16	+1 Lap
15	12	(Estonia) Kullas	Yamaha	16	+1 Lap
16	10	(Estonia) Krestinov	Honda	16	+1 Lap
17	48	(Italy) Lupino	KTM	17	+1:55.661
18	33	(Switzerland) Guillod	Yamaha	16	+1 Lap
19	19	(Germany) Nagl	Husqvarna	16	+1 Lap
20	25	(Spain) Butrón	KTM	16	+1 Lap
21	51	(Austria) Stauffer	KTM	16	+1 Lap
22	78	(Czech Republic) Polák	Yamaha	16	+1 Lap
23	76	(Czech Republic) Drdaj	KTM	16	+1 Lap
24	103	(Finland) Sihvonen	Honda	16	+1 Lap
25	111	(Canada) Medaglia	Gas Gas	16	+1 Lap
26	31	(Switzerland) Tonus	Yamaha	16	+1 Lap
27	30	(Denmark) Bøgh Damm	KTM	16	+1 Lap
28	82	(Lithuania) Karka	Yamaha	15	+2 Laps
29	49	(Austria) Sandner	KTM	15	+2 Laps
30	27	(Spain) Valentín	Husqvarna	15	+2 Laps
31	60	(South Africa) Purdon	KTM	15	+2 Laps
32	109	(Canada) Wright	Honda	15	+2 Laps
33	118	(Bulgaria) Ivanov	Husqvarna	9	Did not finish
34	6	(Belgium) Van Doninck	Yamaha	6	Did not finish
35	120	(Bulgaria) Petrov	Honda	4	Did not finish
36	4	(Belgium) Genot	KTM	1	Did not finish
37	21	(Germany) Jacobi	Honda	1	Did not finish
	24	(Latvia) Macuks	Gas Gas	0	Did not start
	58	(South Africa) Goosen	Husqvarna	0	Did not start
	40	(Sweden) Östlund	Yamaha	0	Did not start
Place	Nr	Rider	Motorcycle	Laps	Gap

=== Nations standings after Race 3 ===
Place	Nation	Points
1	Italy	37
2	Netherlands	38
3	(United Kingdom) Great Britain	39
4	MFR	44
5	France	50
6	Belgium	74
7	Estonia	78
8	Switzerland	80
9	Austria	82
10	Denmark	84
11	Germany	101
12	Finland	108
13	Lithuania	110
14	Canada	112
15	Latvia	114
16	Spain	120
17	Czech Republic	122
18	Bulgaria	170
19	Sweden	48
20	South Africa	134
Place	Nation	Points

== Final standings ==
Place	Nation	Points	Total	Change
1	Italy	2 + 5 + 6 + 7 + 17	37	+ 15
2	Netherlands	1 + 1 + 3 + 15 + 18	38	1
3	United Kingdom	3 + 4 + 6 + 12 + 14	39	=
4	MFR	5 + 7 + 7 + 10 + 15	44	+ 21
5	France	2 + 9 + 9 + 11 + 19	50	=
6	Belgium	4 + 6 + 13 + 17 + 34	74	4
7	Estonia	11 + 13 + 15 + 16 + 23	78	3
8	Switzerland	2 + 4 + 18 + 26 + 30	80	+ 3
9	Austria	3 + 8 + 21 + 25 + 25	82	+ 8
10	Denmark	1 + 13 + 17 + 26 + 74	84	=
11	Germany	5 + 16 + 19 + 24 + 37	101	4
12	Finland	12 + 20 + 21 + 24 + 31	108	*
13	Lithuania	9 + 14 + 27 + 28 + 32	110	+ 15
14	Canada	11 + 23 + 24 + 25 + 29	112	*
15	Latvia	8 + 10 + 28 + 29 + 39	114	7
16	Spain	12 + 20 + 22 + 30 + 35	120	7
17	Czech Republic	18 + 22 + 23 + 26 + 33	122	+ 10
18	Bulgaria	31 + 33 + 35 + 35 + 36	170	*
19	Sweden	8 + 10 + 14 + 16	48	+ 5
20	South Africa	28 + 31 + 34 + 40	134	=
21	Poland			=
22	Ireland			4
23	Venezuela			*
24	Slovenia			11
25	Slovakia			*
26	Croatia			+ 4
27	Portugal			5
28	Ukraine			5
29	Iceland			2
30	Greece			+ 1
31	Morocco			*
