= Rene Hofer =

Austrian motocross racer (2002-2021)

- Nationality: (Austria) Austrian
- Born: 4 January 2002 Alberndorf in der Riedmark, Austria
- Died: 4 December 2021 (aged 19)

Motocross career
- Years active: 2019-2021
- Teams: •KINI KTM Junior Pro Team (2013-2019); •Red Bull KTM (2019-2021)
- Wins: •MX2: 1

Rene Hofer (4 January 2002 – 4 December 2021) was an Austrian professional Motocross racer. Hofer competed in the FIM Motocross World Championship from 2019 to 2021.

During the 2021 season, Hofer took his only Grand Prix victory in the MX2 class. Additionally, Hofer was FIM Junior World Champion in the 85 class in 2016 as well as European Motocross Champion in the EMX85 class in the same year.

Hofer represented Austria at the Motocross des Nations on two occasions, winning the MX2 class individually at the 2021 edition.

In December 2021, when skiing with a group of ten others near Tweng, Hofer was killed after being buried by an avalanche.

== Career ==
=== Junior Career ===
Following a successful start to his career in Austria and central Europe, Hofer finished third in the EMX65 class of the European Motocross Championship in 2012. A week later, he competed in the 65 class of the FIM Motocross Junior World Championship, finishing tenth overall. He bettered this result at the World Championship the following year by finishing sixth overall but dropped off the podium in the EMX65 class of the European Championship, where he finished fifth overall. Moving up to race an 85cc motorcycle in 2014, Hofer concentrated on the Austrian Youth Championship and the Junior Cup class of the ADAC MX Masters. He returned to the FIM Motocross Junior World Championship in 2015, where he finished sixth overall in the 85 class after finishing third in the first race. Alongside this he represented Austria at the Motocross of European Nations in Italy and finished third overall in the Junior Cup of the ADAC MX Masters.

2016 would be Hofer's final and most successful season aboard an 85cc machine. He won the EMX85 class of the 2016 European Motocross Championship, taking a perfect score by winning both races. A few weeks later, in Russia, Hofer would take the 85 class world title at the FIM Motocross Junior World Championship. Alongside his European and World titles, Hofer won the Junior Cup class of the ADAC MX Masters in 2016. With continued support from the KTM KINI Junior Racing team, he moved up to compete in the EMX125 class of the 2017 European Motocross Championship. In his rookie season in the class, he recorded five fifth place race finishes as his best results to end the year fifth in the final standings. This was coupled with finishing fifth overall in the 125 class of the Junior World Championship held in Estonia.

Hofer started the 2018 European Motocross Championship by winning both races at the opening round of the EMX125 class. He took another overall win at the third round and was leading the championship after the fifth round. When racing at the ADAC MX Masters following this, he sustained a fractured pelvis and four broken ribs in a crash which ended his season, resulting in him finishing third in the EMX125 championship.

=== 250 Career ===
After recovering from his injury, Hofer moved up to compete 250cc KTM for the first time, forming part of the same KTM Junior Team as previously. Competing in the EMX250 class of the 2019 European Motocross Championship, Hofer was a consistent top-ten finisher and scored an overall podium at the Russian round - on the same class where he became Junior World Champion in 2016. Alongside this, he made his world championship debut by starting in three rounds of the MX2 class of the 2019 FIM Motocross World Championship. At the third of these in Italy, Hofer finished sixth in the opening race and finished the event seventh overall. Following these results, Hofer represented Austria for the first time at the 2019 Motocross des Nations. His results in the event, including at twelfth in the first main race meant he won the Ricky Carmichael Award for the best young rider in the event.

Hofer joined the Red Bull KTM Factory Racing team to compete full-time in the MX2 class of the 2020 FIM Motocross World Championship. He started the championship strongly, by finishing second in the second race at the opening round. This was followed by two more top-five race finishes over the next couple of rounds. However, at round four, Hofer sustained an injury to his left shoulder which saw him miss the remainder of the COVID-19 pandemic impacted season. Hofer would bounce back from his injury to finish the 2021 FIM Motocross World Championship in sixth in the final standings. At the German round he secured his first overall podium in MX2 by finishing third overall. Four rounds later, in Northern Italy, Hofer took his first World Championship race win and with it the overall to take his first Grand Prix victory. A second race win came at the following round and Hofer secured pole position at the final two rounds of the season. He made his second appearance for his country at the 2021 Motocross des Nations, on this occasion run before the end of the world championship season. After finishing second in his qualifying race, Hofer finished eighth and third in his main races which resulted in him winning the MX2 class individually at the event.

== Honours ==
Motocross des Nations

- Individual Overall: MX2 2021 (gold)
- Ricky Carmichael Motocross of Nations Youngest Rider Award: 2019 (gold)

FIM Motocross Junior World Championship

- 85cc: 2016 (gold)

European Motocross Championship

- EMX125: 2018 (bronze)
- EMX85: 2016 (gold)
- EMX65: 2012 (bronze)

ADAC MX Masters

- Youngster Cup: 2019 (gold)
- Junior Cup: 2016 (gold) , 2015 (bronze)

== Career statistics ==
=== Motocross des Nations ===
Year	Location	Nation	Class	Teammates	Team Overall	Individual Overall
2019	(Netherlands) Assen	AUT	MX2	Lukas Neurauter; Michael Sandner	17th	8th
2021	(Italy) Mantua	AUT	MX2	Michael Sandner; Marcel Stauffer	9th	1st

=== FIM Motocross World Championship ===
==== By season ====
Season	Class	Number	Motorcycle	Team	Race	Race Wins	Overall Wins	Race Top-3	Overall Podium	Pts	Plcd
2019	MX2	711	KTM	KINI KTM Junior Pro Team	6	0	0	0	0	42	29th
2020	MX2	711	KTM	Red Bull KTM Factory Racing	8	0	0	1	0	73	26th
2021	MX2	711	KTM	Red Bull KTM Factory Racing	36	2	1	4	2	527	6th
Total					50	2	1	5	2	642	

==== Grand Prix wins ====
GP wins
GP-win count	Date	Grand Prix	Place
MX2-class
1	27 October 2021	Pietramurata	Pietramurata
