= 2020 FIM Motocross World Championship =

Motocross championship season

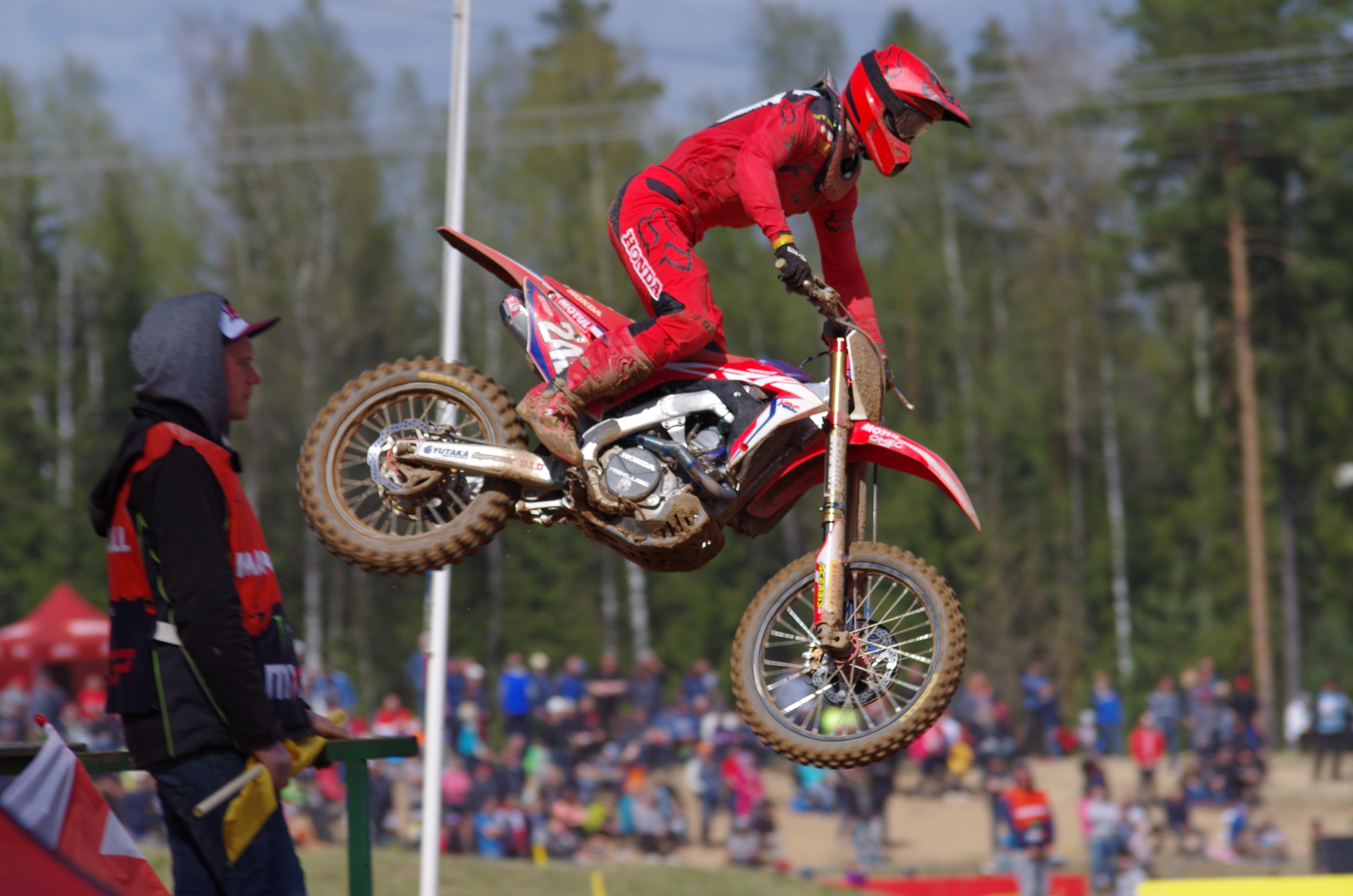
- The Slovenian Tim Gajser, MXGP World Champion.
- Organizer: FIM
- Duration: 1 March to 8 November
- Races: 18
- Manufacturers: 7 (MXGP)
- Teams: 26 (MXGP)
- Drivers: 61 (MXGP)

Champions
- MXGP: (Slovenia) Tim Gajser
- MX2: (France) Tom Vialle
- Women: (New Zealand) Courtney Duncan

Motocross World Championship
- ← 2019 2021 →

The 2020 FIM Motocross World Championship was the 64th FIM Motocross World Championship season. It had 18 events, starting at Matterley Basin on 1 March and ending at Pietramurata, Italy on 8 November. No races were held from April to July due to the COVID-19 pandemic.

== Race calendar and results ==
The championship was planned to contested over twenty rounds in Europe, Asia and South America. A revised calendar was released on 16 October 2019.

Eventually the season saw many changes due to the COVID-19 pandemic – after cancellations and replacements, 18 rounds took place only in Europe and half of them in Italy.

=== MXGP ===
#	Date	Grand Prix	Location	Race 1 Winner	Race 2 Winner	Round Winner
1	1 March	(United Kingdom) MXGP of Great Britain	Matterley Basin	(Netherlands) Jeffrey Herlings	(Slovenia) Tim Gajser	(Netherlands) Jeffrey Herlings
2	8 March	MXGP of The Netherlands	Valkenswaard	(Slovenia) Tim Gajser	(Netherlands) Jeffrey Herlings	(Netherlands) Jeffrey Herlings
3	9 August	MXGP of Latvia	Ķegums	(Slovenia) Tim Gajser	(Netherlands) Glenn Coldenhoff	(Netherlands) Glenn Coldenhoff
4	12 August	MXGP of Riga	Ķegums	(Italy) Tony Cairoli	(Lithuania) Arminas Jasikonis	(Italy) Tony Cairoli
5	16 August	MXGP of Ķegums	Ķegums	(Slovenia) Tim Gajser	(Netherlands) Jeffrey Herlings	(Netherlands) Jeffrey Herlings
6	6 September	MXGP of Italy	Faenza	(Netherlands) Jeffrey Herlings	(Netherlands) Jeffrey Herlings	(Netherlands) Jeffrey Herlings
7	9 September	(Italy) MXGP of Citta di Faenza	Faenza	(Switzerland) Jeremy Seewer	(Slovenia) Tim Gajser	(Spain) Jorge Prado
8	13 September	(Emilia-Romagna) MXGP of Emilia Romagna	Faenza	(Spain) Jorge Prado	(Slovenia) Tim Gajser	(Italy) Tony Cairoli
9	27 September	(Lombardy) MXGP of Lombardia	Mantova	(Switzerland) Jeremy Seewer	(Slovenia) Tim Gajser	(Switzerland) Jeremy Seewer
10	30 September	(Italy) MXGP of Citta di Mantova	Mantova	(Spain) Jorge Prado	(France) Romain Febvre	(France) Romain Febvre
11	4 October	(European Union) MXGP of Europe	Mantova	(Slovenia) Tim Gajser	(Italy) Tony Cairoli	(Slovenia) Tim Gajser
12	11 October	MXGP of Spain	intu Xanadú	(Spain) Jorge Prado	(Spain) Jorge Prado	(Spain) Jorge Prado
13	18 October	MXGP of Flanders	Lommel	(France) Gautier Paulin	(Slovenia) Tim Gajser	(Slovenia) Tim Gajser
14	21 October	(Limburg (Belgium)) MXGP of Limburg	Lommel	(Slovenia) Tim Gajser	(Spain) Jorge Prado	(Spain) Jorge Prado
15	25 October	MXGP of Lommel	Lommel	(Slovenia) Tim Gajser	(Slovenia) Tim Gajser	(Slovenia) Tim Gajser
16	1 November	MXGP of Trentino	Pietramurata	(Slovenia) Tim Gajser	(Belgium) Clément Desalle	(Italy) Tony Cairoli
17	4 November	(Italy) MXGP of Pietramurata	Pietramurata	(Switzerland) Jeremy Seewer	(Slovenia) Tim Gajser	(Slovenia) Tim Gajser
18	8 November	(Italy) MXGP of Garda Trentino	Pietramurata	(France) Romain Febvre	(Slovenia) Tim Gajser	(Slovenia) Tim Gajser

=== MX2 ===
Round	Date	Grand Prix	Location	Race 1 Winner	Race 2 Winner	Round Winner	Report
1	1 March	(United Kingdom) MXGP of Great Britain	Matterley Basin	(Belgium) Jago Geerts	(France) Tom Vialle	(Belgium) Jago Geerts	
2	8 March	MXGP of The Netherlands	Valkenswaard	(Belgium) Jago Geerts	(France) Tom Vialle	(France) Tom Vialle	
3	9 August	MXGP of Latvia	Ķegums	(France) Tom Vialle	(Belgium) Jago Geerts	(France) Tom Vialle	
4	12 August	MXGP of Riga	Ķegums	(Belgium) Jago Geerts	(Belgium) Jago Geerts	(Belgium) Jago Geerts	
5	16 August	MXGP of Ķegums	Ķegums	(France) Tom Vialle	(Belgium) Jago Geerts	(Belgium) Jago Geerts	
6	6 September	MXGP of Italy	Faenza	(Belgium) Jago Geerts	(France) Maxime Renaux	(France) Maxime Renaux	
7	9 September	(Italy) MXGP of Citta di Faenza	Faenza	(France) Tom Vialle	(France) Tom Vialle	(France) Tom Vialle	
8	13 September	MXGP of Emilia Romagna	Faenza	(Belgium) Jago Geerts	(France) Tom Vialle	(France) Tom Vialle	
9	27 September	MXGP of Lombardia	Mantova	(France) Tom Vialle	(Australia) Jed Beaton	(Denmark) Thomas Kjær Olsen	
10	30 September	(Italy) MXGP of Citta di Mantova	Mantova	(Denmark) Thomas Kjær Olsen	(France) Tom Vialle	(Denmark) Thomas Kjær Olsen	
11	4 October	(European Union) MXGP of Europe	Mantova	(France) Tom Vialle	(Belgium) Jago Geerts	(Belgium) Jago Geerts	
12	11 October	MXGP of Spain	intu Xanadú	(France) Tom Vialle	(Belgium) Jago Geerts	(France) Tom Vialle	
13	18 October	MXGP of Flanders	Lommel	(United Kingdom) Ben Watson	(Belgium) Jago Geerts	(France) Tom Vialle	
14	21 October	(Limburg (Belgium)) MXGP of Limburg	Lommel	(Belgium) Jago Geerts	(France) Tom Vialle	(France) Tom Vialle	
15	25 October	MXGP of Lommel	Lommel	(United Kingdom) Ben Watson	(Netherlands) Roan van de Moosdijk	(United Kingdom) Ben Watson	
16	1 November	MXGP of Trentino	Pietramurata	(Denmark) Thomas Kjær Olsen	(Belgium) Jago Geerts	(Belgium) Jago Geerts	
17	4 November	(Italy) MXGP of Pietramurata	Pietramurata	(France) Tom Vialle	(Belgium) Jago Geerts	(Belgium) Jago Geerts	
18	8 November	(Italy) MXGP of Garda Trentino	Pietramurata	(France) Tom Vialle	(United Kingdom) Ben Watson	(United Kingdom) Ben Watson	

== MXGP ==
=== Entry list ===
Officially Approved Teams & Riders
Team	Constructor	No	Rider	Rounds
Monster Energy Kawasaki Racing Team	Kawasaki	3	(France) Romain Febvre	1, 3–18
Monster Energy Kawasaki Racing Team	Kawasaki	25	(Belgium) Clément Desalle	All
Monster Energy Yamaha Factory MXGP	Yamaha	4	(Switzerland) Arnaud Tonus	1–9, 13–18
Monster Energy Yamaha Factory MXGP	Yamaha	21	(France) Gautier Paulin	All
Monster Energy Yamaha Factory MXGP	Yamaha	91	(Switzerland) Jeremy Seewer	All
JM Honda Racing	Honda	6	(France) Benoît Paturel	1–5, 15–18
JM Honda Racing	Honda	33	(Belgium) Julien Lieber	
JM Honda Racing	Honda	53	(New Zealand) Dylan Walsh	5–18
JM Honda Racing	Honda	96	(Australia) Kyle Webster	13
JM Honda Racing	Honda	555	(Russia) Artem Guryev	3–15
A1M Husqvarna	Husqvarna	7	(Estonia) Tanel Leok	1–11, 13–18
A1M Husqvarna	Husqvarna	132	(Estonia) Karel Kutsar	18
A1M Husqvarna	Husqvarna	191	(Finland) Rene Rannikko	13–15
Gebben Van Venrooy Yamaha Racing	Yamaha	10	(Netherlands) Calvin Vlaanderen	1–15
Gebben Van Venrooy Yamaha Racing	Yamaha	32	(Belgium) Brent Van Doninck	16–18
Gebben Van Venrooy Yamaha Racing	Yamaha	64	(United States) Thomas Covington	1–10
Gebben Van Venrooy Yamaha Racing	Yamaha	77	(Italy) Alessandro Lupino	1–9, 16–18
JD Gunnex KTM Racing Team	KTM	17	(Spain) José Butrón	1–2, 6–18
JD Gunnex KTM Racing Team	KTM	811	(United Kingdom) Adam Sterry	1–2
Hitachi KTM fuelled by Milwaukee	KTM	811	(United Kingdom) Adam Sterry	3–5, 9–18
KSRT MX Hens	Suzuki	22	(Belgium) Kevin Strijbos	1–2
SS24 KTM MXGP	KTM	24	(United Kingdom) Shaun Simpson	1–3
Rockstar Energy Husqvarna Factory Racing Team	Husqvarna	27	(Lithuania) Arminas Jasikonis	1–9
Rockstar Energy Husqvarna Factory Racing Team	Husqvarna	41	(Latvia) Pauls Jonass	1–2
Yamaha SM Action – M.C. Migliori	Yamaha	29	(Germany) Henry Jacobi	1–13
Scandinavian Racing Sports	KTM	30	(Sweden) Eddie Hjortmarker	
Team HRC	Honda	43	(Australia) Mitchell Evans	1–12
Team HRC	Honda	243	(Slovenia) Tim Gajser	All
Red Bull KTM De Carli Factory Racing	KTM	61	(Spain) Jorge Prado	1–14
Red Bull KTM De Carli Factory Racing	KTM	222	(Italy) Antonio Cairoli	All
MGR Motocross Team	KTM	66	(Spain) Iker Larrañaga	1
Red Bull KTM Factory Racing	KTM	84	(Netherlands) Jeffrey Herlings	1–7
Honda SR Motoblouz	Honda	89	(Belgium) Jeremy Van Horebeek	1–17
Honda SR Motoblouz	Honda	92	(Switzerland) Valentin Guillod	1–6, 9–18
Honda SR Motoblouz	Honda	991	(United Kingdom) Nathan Watson	15
SixtyTwo Motosport Husqvarna Team	Husqvarna	93	(Sweden) Jonathan Bengtsson	1
Standing Construct GasGas Factory Racing	Gas Gas	128	(Italy) Ivo Monticelli	1–6, 8–18
Standing Construct GasGas Factory Racing	Gas Gas	259	(Netherlands) Glenn Coldenhoff	1–13
Marchetti Racing Team KTM	KTM	189	(Netherlands) Brian Bogers	All
KTM Sarholz Racing Team	KTM	226	(Germany) Tom Koch	1–9, 13–18
KTM Sarholz Racing Team	KTM	760	(Austria) Pascal Rauchenecker	6–8
KTM Sarholz Racing Team	KTM	911	(France) Jordi Tixier	2
JT911 KTM Racing	KTM	911	(France) Jordi Tixier	3–10, 12–18
JWR Racing	Honda	297	(Sweden) Anton Gole	1–6
JWR Racing	Honda	302	(Norway) Cornelius Tøndel	8, 13–15
Ghidinelli Racing s.s.d s.r.l	Yamaha	321	(Italy) Samuele Bernardini	1–7, 9–11, 16–18
SDM Corse Yamaha Racing	Yamaha	747	(Italy) Michele Cervellin	1–9, 13–18
PAR Homes RFX Husqvarna	Husqvarna	777	(Russia) Evgeny Bobryshev	1–5, 7–10, 13–18
Wild Card Teams & Riders
Team	Constructor	No	Rider	Rounds
Chambers Racing	Husqvarna	15	(United Kingdom) Jake Millward	1–2
ASA United Husqvarna	Husqvarna	32	(Belgium) Brent Van Doninck	1–2, 13–15
	KTM	36	(Spain) David Jiménez	12
Kros Team Gaerne	Honda	45	(Italy) Davide De Bortoli	6–7
MX88 Motorsport	KTM	88	(Netherlands) Freek van der Vlist	2, 13–15
SKS Husqvarna Racing Team	Husqvarna	107	(Netherlands) Lars van Berkel	2
	KTM	112	(Zimbabwe) Jayden Boyd Ashwell	1
WZ Racing	KTM	116	(Latvia) Kārlis Sabulis	3–5, 9
Cab Screens/Deos Group Racing	Honda	151	(Estonia) Harri Kullas	2
Team VRT Nordpesca Holland	KTM	152	(Bulgaria) Petar Petrov	All
	KTM	160	(Greece) Manolis Kritikos	13, 15
Team Honda RJ	Honda	201	(France) Zachary Pichon	6–8, 16–18
Team Beddini Racing	KTM	211	(Italy) Nicholas Lapucci	3–7, 9–11
Galvin MX Team	KTM	228	(Netherlands) Kay Ebben	15
Team 32	Yamaha	232	(France) Milko Potisek	15
3C Racing CM Team	Yamaha	267	(Italy) Edoardo Bersanelli	6–7, 9–10
R2R Store KTM	KTM	311	(Belgium) Heikki Geens	13–15
MX Moduls	Husqvarna	391	(Latvia) Matīss Karro	3–5
Husqvarna Motorcycle España	Husqvarna	920	(Spain) Ander Valentín	12, 16–18

=== Riders Championship ===
Pos	No.	Rider	Bike	GBR (United Kingdom)		NED (Netherlands)		LAT (Latvia)		RIG		KEG		ITA (Italy)		CDF (Italy)		EMR		LOM		CDM (Italy)		EUR (European Union)		ESP (Spain)		FLA (Flanders)		LIM (Limburg (Belgium))		LOM		TRE		PIE (Italy)		GAR (Italy)		Points
1	243	(Slovenia) Tim Gajser	Honda	8	1	1	2	1	5	Ret	5	1	Ret	8	5	5	1	5	1	8	1	5	3	1	2	3	2	2	1	1	3	1	1	1	4	2	1	2	1	720
2	91	(Switzerland) Jeremy Seewer	Yamaha	2	8	14	Ret	5	2	4	2	Ret	7	2	2	1	7	3	4	1	3	2	9	6	3	10	5	8	3	4	7	4	3	3	5	1	3	3	4	618
3	222	(Italy) Tony Cairoli	KTM	4	3	7	5	7	17	1	4	9	2	3	3	4	3	2	2	3	15	4	4	5	1	7	6	13	6	5	2	3	10	2	2	6	5	6	Ret	599
4	3	(France) Romain Febvre	Kawasaki	DNS	DNS			3	3	2	11	5	5	6	4	3	6	10	3	10	5	3	1	10	4	2	3	6	2	3	4	2	2	14	6	5	2	1	2	572
5	21	(France) Gautier Paulin	Yamaha	7	4	5	11	9	11	13	8	6	8	5	11	8	10	11	9	13	6	10	2	7	7	6	10	1	5	19	6	5	4	4	3	9	7	4	3	505
6	61	(Spain) Jorge Prado	KTM	9	12	4	13	8	7	29	13	3	4	4	6	2	2	1	6	2	4	1	6	3	17	1	1	3	4	2	1									476
7	25	(Belgium) Clément Desalle	Kawasaki	5	5	6	8	12	10	6	6	8	13	11	16	11	9	9	7	7	7	9	17	12	6	4	7	11	13	8	10	10	6	6	1	4	4	7	7	466
8	259	(Netherlands) Glenn Coldenhoff	Gas Gas	6	6	9	7	2	1	7	Ret	7	6	7	8	6	5	8	5	4	2	7	5	2	5	5	4	DNS	DNS											375
9	89	(Belgium) Jeremy Van Horebeek	Honda	14	17	8	6	10	Ret	5	14	10	10	Ret	12	13	11	12	11	9	10	8	8	14	Ret	9	9	5	10	11	8	9	15	13	11	12	Ret			316
10	189	(Netherlands) Brian Bogers	KTM	17	13	10	Ret	18	13	10	17	19	Ret	DNS	28	15	13	21	Ret	12	13	15	16	9	10	8	8	4	7	7	5	6	7	12	9	8	6	22	5	298
11	911	(France) Jordi Tixier	KTM			18	Ret	15	9	12	12	15	17	12	13	16	16	13	14	15	12	11	10			11	13	9	14	9	11	7	9	8	12	10	18	11	8	271
12	84	(Netherlands) Jeffrey Herlings	KTM	1	2	2	1	4	4	3	3	4	1	1	1	DNS	DNS																							263
13	27	(Lithuania) Arminas Jasikonis	Husqvarna	15	14	3	3	6	6	8	1	2	3	10	9	10	8	6	13	6	Ret																			248
14	43	(Australia) Mitchell Evans	Honda	3	7	Ret	DNS	19	18	26	15	12	9	9	7	9	4	4	8	18	9	6	7	4	8	Ret	DNS													228
15	128	(Italy) Ivo Monticelli	Gas Gas	Ret	24	15	Ret	Ret	Ret	11	7	11	11	19	17			15	21	Ret	16	14	13	8	11	13	12	Ret	11	12	12	14	17	9	8	14	8	17	12	219
16	10	(Netherlands) Calvin Vlaanderen	Yamaha	19	31	Ret	Ret	11	12	15	9	13	Ret	14	20	12	22	14	12	5	11	12	Ret	11	9	14	14	Ret	9	6	9	13	13							206
17	4	(Switzerland) Arnaud Tonus	Yamaha	11	18	17	15	16	25	9	10	17	12	16	Ret	19	Ret	DNS	DNS	23	DNS							7	15	20	20	8	5	5	13	15	17	5	9	184
18	77	(Italy) Alessandro Lupino	Yamaha	26	15	Ret	Ret	21	15	Ret	23	Ret	DNS	20	10	7	12	7	10	11	26													7	7	3	11	Ret	11	150
19	29	(Germany) Henry Jacobi	Yamaha	10	9	Ret	Ret	24	16	21	22	14	15	21	14	14	Ret	16	17	14	8	13	12	13	12	15	11	DNS	DNS											134
20	747	(Italy) Michele Cervellin	Yamaha	13	16	12	Ret	13	14	14	16	18	14	13	15	Ret	DNS	DNS	DNS	Ret	DNS							17	17	18	Ret	Ret	Ret	11	15	13	14	13	14	130
21	32	(Belgium) Brent Van Doninck	Husqvarna	22	22	20	17																					10	8	10	Ret	Ret	8							110
21	32	(Belgium) Brent Van Doninck	Yamaha																															16	10	7	9	Ret	6	110
22	777	(Russia) Evgeny Bobryshev	Husqvarna	Ret	27	16	9	27	21	Ret	DNS	DNS	DNS			22	18	Ret	15	Ret	DNS	Ret	14					14	12	16	13	18	11	Ret	Ret	18	15	9	10	107
23	7	(Estonia) Tanel Leok	Husqvarna	25	29	Ret	18	22	20	23	24	22	19	26	22	25	15	Ret	23	17	18	17	15	17	13			16	16	15	16	16	16	17	16	19	16	18	18	94
24	92	(Switzerland) Valentin Guillod	Honda	16	25	28	Ret	31	27	27	19	20	20	22	Ret					25	Ret	22	22	16	20	12	16	15	18	14	17	Ret	18	10	19	20	10	10	Ret	88
25	53	(New Zealand) Dylan Walsh	Honda									23	Ret	15	18	18	20	17	Ret	Ret	14	20	11	Ret	15	Ret	Ret	19	22	17	14	17	12	21	Ret	16	21	19	13	82
26	152	(Bulgaria) Petar Petrov	KTM	20	20	Ret	16	17	Ret	19	29	Ret	DNS	Ret	21	24	19	19	22	27	20	18	18	19	16	17	17	12	Ret	13	22	12	20	15	17	17	Ret	21	20	81
27	811	(United Kingdom) Adam Sterry	KTM	33	19	24	Ret	26	23	18	27	Ret	16							16	17	19	20	20	19	18	15	Ret	19	23	15	Ret	19	Ret	18	11	13	12	19	76
28	6	(France) Benoît Paturel	Honda	24	10	11	Ret	14	8	17	21	Ret	DNS																			Ret	DNS	22	21	24	12	8	Ret	67
29	17	(Spain) José Butrón	KTM	27	26	Ret	22							Ret	23	Ret	21	23	20	Ret	23	21	19	18	14	16	18	23	25	Ret	24	Ret	Ret	19	20	22	20	15	16	36
30	24	(United Kingdom) Shaun Simpson	KTM	18	11	25	4	Ret	Ret																															31
31	41	(Latvia) Pauls Jonass	Husqvarna	12	Ret	13	12																																	26
32	321	(Italy) Samuele Bernardini	Yamaha	23	33	26	19	Ret	28	25	Ret	Ret	24	Ret	26	23	23			19	22	16	21	Ret	Ret									18	Ret	21	23	14	15	25
33	760	(Austria) Pascal Rauchenecker	KTM											18	19	17	14	Ret	18																					19
34	116	(Latvia) Kārlis Sabulis	KTM					20	19	16	18	16	23							21	19																			18
35	211	(Italy) Nicholas Lapucci	KTM					25	24	Ret	Ret	Ret	DNS	17	Ret	20	25			20	21	Ret	DNS	15	18															15
36	64	(United States) Thomas Covington	Yamaha	32	32	DNS	DNS	28	29	22	Ret	26	18	23	25	21	17	18	16	26	24	24	25																	15
37	226	(Germany) Tom Koch	KTM	29	30	27	20	29	26	24	26	21	22	25	24	26	24	20	24	22	Ret							18	20	Ret	18	Ret	24	23	22	25	22	20	17	14
38	201	(France) Zachary Pichon	Honda											24	Ret	Ret	DNS	22	19															20	14	23	19	Ret	21	12
39	151	(Estonia) Harri Kullas	Honda			21	10																																	11
40	991	(United Kingdom) Nathan Watson	Honda																													11	22							10
41	88	(Netherlands) Freek van der Vlist	KTM			23	21																					DSQ	Ret	21	19	21	14							9
42	107	(Netherlands) Lars van Berkel	Husqvarna			19	14																																	9
43	920	(Spain) Ander Valentín	Husqvarna																							19	19							24	23	Ret	Ret	16	23	9
44	232	(France) Milko Potisek	Yamaha																													15	21							6
45	228	(Netherlands) Kay Ebben	KTM																													19	23							2
46	555	(Russia) Artem Guryev	Honda					30	30	30	28	Ret	25	28	29	28	27	24	25	24	25	23	24	21	21	20	20	24	26	24	Ret	Ret	Ret							2
47	191	(Finland) Rene Rannikko	Husqvarna																									20	23	Ret	23	20	DNS							2
48	297	(Sweden) Anton Gole	Honda	28	23	DNS	DNS	Ret	Ret	20	20	24	Ret	Ret	Ret																									2
	302	(Norway) Cornelius Tøndel	Honda															25	26									21	21	22	21	22	Ret							0
	22	(Belgium) Kevin Strijbos	Suzuki	21	21	22	Ret																																	0
	391	(Latvia) Matīss Karro	Husqvarna					23	22	28	25	25	21																											0
	132	(Estonia) Karel Kutsar	Husqvarna																																			23	22	0
	160	(Greece) Manolis Kritikos	KTM																									22	24			Ret	DNS							0
	311	(Belgium) Heikki Geens	KTM																									Ret	27	25	25	23	25							0
	267	(Italy) Edoardo Bersanelli	Yamaha											27	27	27	26			28	27	25	23																	0
	15	(United Kingdom) Jake Millward	Husqvarna	30	28	Ret	DNS																																	0
	66	(Spain) Iker Larrañaga	KTM	31	34																																			0
	93	(Sweden) Jonathan Bengtsson	Husqvarna	34	Ret																																			0
	112	(Zimbabwe) Jayden Ashwell	KTM	35	35																																			0
	45	(Italy) Davide De Bortoli	Honda											Ret	Ret	Ret	Ret																							0
	96	(Australia) Kyle Webster	Honda																									Ret	Ret											0
	36	(Spain) David Jiménez	KTM																							DNS	DNS													0
Pos	No.	Rider	Bike	GBR (United Kingdom)		NED (Netherlands)		LAT (Latvia)		RIG		KEG		ITA (Italy)		CDF (Italy)		EMR		LOM		CDM (Italy)		EUR (European Union)		ESP (Spain)		FLA (Flanders)		LIM (Limburg (Belgium))		LOM		TRE		PIE (Italy)		GAR (Italy)		Points

=== Manufacturers Championship ===
Pos	Bike	GBR (United Kingdom)		NED (Netherlands)		LAT (Latvia)		RIG		KEG		ITA (Italy)		CDF (Italy)		EMR		LOM		CDM (Italy)		EUR (European Union)		ESP (Spain)		FLA (Flanders)		LIM (Limburg (Belgium))		LOM		TRE		PIE (Italy)		GAR (Italy)		Points
1	KTM	1	2	2	1	4	4	1	3	3	1	1	1	2	2	1	2	2	4	1	4	3	1	1	1	3	4	2	1	3	7	2	2	6	5	6	5	764
2	Honda	3	1	1	2	1	5	5	5	1	9	8	5	5	1	4	1	8	1	5	3	1	2	3	2	2	1	1	3	1	1	1	4	2	1	2	1	757
3	Yamaha	2	4	5	11	5	2	4	2	6	7	2	2	1	7	3	4	1	3	2	2	6	3	6	5	1	3	4	6	4	3	3	3	1	3	3	3	690
4	Kawasaki	5	5	6	8	3	3	2	6	5	5	6	4	3	6	9	3	7	5	3	1	10	4	2	3	6	2	3	4	2	2	6	1	4	2	1	2	661
5	Gas Gas	6	6	9	7	2	1	7	7	7	6	7	8	6	5	8	5	4	2	7	5	2	5	5	4	Ret	11	12	12	14	17	9	8	14	8	17	12	486
6	Husqvarna	12	14	3	3	6	6	8	1	2	3	10	9	10	8	6	13	6	18	17	14	17	13	19	19	10	8	10	13	16	8	17	16	18	15	9	10	383
	Suzuki	21	21	22	Ret																																	0
Pos	Bike	GBR (United Kingdom)		NED (Netherlands)		LAT (Latvia)		RIG		KEG		ITA (Italy)		CDF (Italy)		EMR		LOM		CDM (Italy)		EUR (European Union)		ESP (Spain)		FLA (Flanders)		LIM (Limburg (Belgium))		LOM		TRE		PIE (Italy)		GAR (Italy)		Points

== MX2 ==
=== Entry list ===
Officially Approved Teams & Riders
Team	Constructor	No	Rider	Rounds
F&H Kawasaki MX2 Racing Team	Kawasaki	11	(Denmark) Mikkel Haarup	1–7, 9–10
F&H Kawasaki MX2 Racing Team	Kawasaki	39	(Netherlands) Roan van de Moosdijk	All
F&H Kawasaki MX2 Racing Team	Kawasaki	172	(France) Mathys Boisramé	1–7, 9–13
BUD Racing Kawasaki	Kawasaki	12	(United States) Mitchell Harrison	1–2
Rockstar Energy Husqvarna Factory Racing Team	Husqvarna	14	(Australia) Jed Beaton	All
Rockstar Energy Husqvarna Factory Racing Team	Husqvarna	19	(Denmark) Thomas Kjær Olsen	All
Team Steels Dr. Jack	KTM	18	(Italy) Leonardo Angeli	16–18
Team Steels Dr. Jack	KTM	44	(Italy) Morgan Lesiardo	3–11
Team Steels Dr. Jack	KTM	211	(Italy) Nicholas Lapucci	1–2
DRT Kawasaki	Kawasaki	20	(Australia) Wilson Todd	1–2, 17–18
Red Bull KTM Factory Racing	KTM	28	(France) Tom Vialle	All
Red Bull KTM Factory Racing	KTM	711	(Austria) Rene Hofer	1–4
Ghidinelli Racing s.s.d s.r.l	Yamaha	44	(Italy) Morgan Lesiardo	1–2
Honda 114 Motorsports	Honda	44	(Italy) Morgan Lesiardo	12–18
Honda 114 Motorsports	Honda	47	(Australia) Bailey Malkiewicz	All
Honda 114 Motorsports	Honda	199	(Australia) Nathan Crawford	1–10
F&H Racing Shop	Kawasaki	46	(Netherlands) Davy Pootjes	
SDM Corse Yamaha Racing	Yamaha	70	(Spain) Rubén Fernández	All
Sahkar KTM Racing	KTM	75	(Estonia) Hardi Roosiorg	1–5
NR83	KTM	83	(Belgium) Nathan Renkens	1–4, 6–10, 12–18
Hitachi KTM fuelled by Milwaukee	KTM	98	(Netherlands) Bas Vaessen	1–5, 9–18
Hitachi KTM fuelled by Milwaukee	KTM	426	(United Kingdom) Conrad Mewse	1–13, 15–18
Husqvarna Junior Racing Maddii	Husqvarna	101	(Italy) Mattia Guadagnini	1, 6–7
Husqvarna Junior Racing Maddii	Husqvarna	303	(Italy) Alberto Forato	1–5, 9–14
Husqvarna Junior Racing Maddii	Husqvarna	707	(Germany) Maximilian Spies	6–8, 16
JD Gunnex KTM Racing Team	KTM	102	(Slovakia) Richard Šikyňa	1–12, 15–18
JD Gunnex KTM Racing Team	KTM	224	(Czech Republic) Jakub Terešák	3–6, 12, 16–18
DIGA-Procross GasGas Factory Juniors	Gas Gas	104	(Germany) Jeremy Sydow	1–2, 6
DIGA-Procross GasGas Factory Juniors	Gas Gas	516	(Germany) Simon Längenfelder	1–7
DIGA-Procross GasGas Factory Juniors	Gas Gas	517	(Sweden) Isak Gifting	9–18
DIGA-Procross GasGas Factory Juniors	Gas Gas	766	(Austria) Michael Sandner	9–18
iXS MXGP Team	Yamaha	105	(Belgium) Cyril Genot	1–11, 13–15
iXS MXGP Team	Yamaha	313	(Czech Republic) Petr Polák	1–6, 13–18
A1M Husqvarna	Husqvarna	109	(Austria) Roland Edelbacher	1–2
A1M Husqvarna	Husqvarna	258	(Estonia) Johannes Nermann	3–11, 13–18
Honda Racing Assomotor	Honda	118	(France) Stephen Rubini	All
Honda Racing Assomotor	Honda	161	(Sweden) Alvin Östlund	All
JK Racing Yamaha	Yamaha	142	(Finland) Jere Haavisto	2–5
JK Racing Yamaha	Yamaha	192	(Denmark) Glen Meier	1, 6–11, 13–18
Monster Energy Yamaha Factory MX2	Yamaha	193	(Belgium) Jago Geerts	All
Monster Energy Yamaha Factory MX2	Yamaha	919	(United Kingdom) Ben Watson	All
Maggiora Park Racing Team	KTM	200	(Italy) Filippo Zonta	1–2, 9–11
Marchetti Racing Team KTM	KTM	240	(Norway) Kevin Horgmo	1–3, 6–18
KTM Racestore MX2	KTM	253	(Slovenia) Jan Pancar	All
Team Beddini Racing	KTM	275	(Italy) Joakin Furbetta	1–7, 9–11, 16–18
PAR Homes RFX Husqvarna	Husqvarna	326	(United Kingdom) Josh Gilbert	1–5, 7–10, 13–18
MGR Motocross Team	KTM	443	(Finland) Matias Vesterinen	3–7, 9
MGR Motocross Team	KTM	460	(Belgium) Lucas Adam	8
E2T Racing Team	Husqvarna	783	(France) Enzo Toriani	2–11
Yamaha SM Action – M.C. Migliori	Yamaha	939	(France) Maxime Renaux	All
Wild Card Teams & Riders
Team	Constructor	No	Rider	Rounds
Chambers Racing	Husqvarna	16	(United Kingdom) Tom Grimshaw	1–2
F4E Racing KTM	KTM	48	(United Kingdom) Adam Collings	15
Jezyk Racing Team	KTM	50	(Spain) Oriol Oliver	16
Yamaha Ausio Racing Team	Yamaha	67	(Spain) Yago Martínez	12
Craigs Motorcycles	KTM	115	(United Kingdom) Ashton Dickinson	1–15
RSR Plant Services	KTM	182	(Republic of Ireland) Jake Sheridan	13–15
JC184 Racing Team	Husqvarna	184	(United Kingdom) James Carpenter	2, 15
Hutten Metaal Yamaha Racing	Yamaha	198	(France) Thibault Benistant	15–17
Team S11 Motorsport	Husqvarna	209	(Italy) Gianmarco Cenerelli	6–7
Tech32 Racing MX	Husqvarna	324	(France) Maxime Charlier	6, 11
KTM Sarholz Racing Team	KTM	470	(Germany) Peter König	13–14
	KTM	518	(France) François Doré	16
Rob Hooper Yamaha Pro Motocross Team	Yamaha	575	(United Kingdom) Taylor Hammal	1
	KTM	614	(Belgium) Glenn Bielen	13
KD Donckers MX Team	Kawasaki	801	(Belgium) Jordi Van Mieghem	15

=== Riders Championship ===
Pos	No.	Rider	Bike	GBR (United Kingdom)		NED (Netherlands)		LAT (Latvia)		RIG		KEG		ITA (Italy)		CDF (Italy)		EMR		LOM		CDM (Italy)		EUR (European Union)		ESP (Spain)		FLA (Flanders)		LIM (Limburg (Belgium))		LOM		TRE		PIE (Italy)		GAR (Italy)		Points
1	28	(France) Tom Vialle	KTM	6	1	2	1	1	2	4	4	1	2	4	2	1	1	2	1	1	14	3	1	1	2	1	2	2	2	2	1	3	6	2	3	1	23	1	5	759
2	193	(Belgium) Jago Geerts	Yamaha	1	4	1	7	16	1	1	1	2	1	1	3	3	9	1	2	11	8	8	5	2	1	5	1	4	1	1	7	13	7	4	1	5	1	4	Ret	679
3	959	(France) Maxime Renaux	Yamaha	13	8	3	3	7	10	7	5	6	4	2	1	2	4	10	9	3	5	2	9	24	9	6	5	3	6	8	4	2	5	8	5	3	5	2	4	581
4	14	(Australia) Jed Beaton	Husqvarna	2	6	6	2	15	6	8	6	11	6	6	6	12	2	4	3	7	1	6	6	5	5	3	10	7	7	10	10	7	8	3	9	2	4	7	2	564
5	919	(United Kingdom) Ben Watson	Yamaha	7	22	5	4	6	5	Ret	9	3	5	Ret	9	9	11	7	5	6	2	4	15	6	3	9	6	1	5	3	2	1	4	10	6	4	2	3	1	551
6	19	(Denmark) Thomas Kjær Olsen	Husqvarna	11	5	11	6	11	9	5	Ret	DNS	DNS	9	7	4	3	3	6	2	4	1	2	4	4	2	7	5	4	7	6	5	3	1	4	6	8	13	6	540
7	39	(Netherlands) Roan van de Moosdijk	Kawasaki	9	11	12	DNS	2	4	2	2	4	3	Ret	5	Ret	13	6	4	4	6	5	3	Ret	7	8	3	10	3	Ret	3	6	1	9	8	9	Ret	9	DNS	466
8	426	(United Kingdom) Conrad Mewse	KTM	4	17	7	9	Ret	Ret	14	11	5	7	5	17	10	6	5	16	18	3	7	4	3	6	4	12	13	23			9	13	6	16	Ret	10	8	7	365
9	70	(Spain) Rubén Fernández	Yamaha	10	Ret	Ret	DNS	3	7	12	7	10	8	Ret	10	8	7	9	7	13	Ret	9	11	9	11	Ret	4	9	10	4	9	Ret	Ret	5	12	8	6	10	Ret	343
10	118	(France) Stephen Rubini	Honda	19	Ret	DNS	DNS	17	16	10	Ret	12	14	7	11	7	5	8	8	8	9	14	Ret	Ret	Ret	7	9	12	13	6	12	Ret	10	25	14	11	7	5	17	279
11	161	(Sweden) Alvin Östlund	Honda	17	24	19	14	8	13	13	10	8	10	Ret	14	14	14	13	15	20	7	Ret	14	19	16	18	16	8	11	9	11	12	9	17	19	13	9	12	8	263
12	517	(Sweden) Isak Gifting	Gas Gas																	9	10	10	8	7	24	11	8	6	8	5	5	8	2	7	7	18	18	6	3	248
13	172	(France) Mathys Boisramé	Kawasaki	14	7	Ret	10	4	3	3	3	15	9	3	4	5	Ret			5	Ret	15	10	11	12	Ret	DNS	Ret	DNS											234
14	47	(Australia) Bailey Malkiewicz	Honda	38	29	25	12	21	26	19	17	16	20	Ret	15	15	20	12	21	10	23	19	7	12	14	Ret	15	Ret	15	14	19	16	14	12	24	12	12	15	9	164
15	98	(Netherlands) Bas Vaessen	KTM	16	Ret	8	Ret	13	12	Ret	DNS	Ret	DNS							Ret	15	16	13	10	Ret	15	13	11	14	13	8	11	12	19	11	16	11	Ret	DNS	163
16	303	(Italy) Alberto Forato	Husqvarna	5	9	DNS	DNS	10	11	18	Ret	7	Ret							12	11	11	Ret	8	10	10	14	17	12	15	Ret									156
17	44	(Italy) Morgan Lesiardo	Yamaha	22	20	20	22																																	143
17	44	(Italy) Morgan Lesiardo	KTM					22	Ret	21	Ret	DNS	DNS	10	13	11	21	15	12	16	24	20	22	13	21															143
17	44	(Italy) Morgan Lesiardo	Honda																							13	17	19	18	Ret	16	17	17	11	17	10	14	11	10	143
18	240	(Norway) Kevin Horgmo	KTM	23	19	18	18	Ret	DNS					13	Ret	20	17	21	10	Ret	13	13	19	14	8	16	11	15	Ret	Ret	20	14	16	18	10	14	19	Ret	11	137
19	11	(Denmark) Mikkel Haarup	Kawasaki	3	3	9	Ret	9	25	6	8	Ret	12	17	Ret	Ret	DNS			17	12	Ret	Ret																	118
20	253	(Slovenia) Jan Pancar	Yamaha	32	26	28	20	24	20	27	Ret	17	16	8	12	16	10	16	13	25	29	27	17	21	13	20	18	21	17	Ret	15	26	22	13	18	19	Ret	14	14	115
21	326	(United Kingdom) Josh Gilbert	Husqvarna	Ret	18	13	24	20	18	15	16	14	11			19	12	17	11	21	17	22	20					16	16	17	Ret	Ret	DNS	16	15	17	Ret	20	12	112
22	83	(Belgium) Nathan Renkens	KTM	34	Ret	23	13	Ret	Ret	Ret	DNS			19	18	30	18	18	17	14	19	12	12			17	Ret	18	9	12	14	15	15	23	23	20	Ret	16	21	103
23	199	(Australia) Nathan Crawford	Honda	18	10	17	11	14	8	Ret	22	9	Ret	16	Ret	17	Ret	11	14	30	16	Ret	DNS																	91
24	198	(France) Thibault Benistant	Yamaha																													4	11	15	2	7	3			90
25	105	(Belgium) Cyril Genot	Yamaha	30	27	16	Ret	12	14	11	13	Ret	Ret	Ret	19	25	23	20	20	29	18	18	Ret	23	Ret			14	Ret	11	13	10	DNS							85
26	711	(Austria) Rene Hofer	KTM	8	2	4	26	5	Ret	17	Ret																													73
27	102	(Slovakia) Richard Šikyňa	KTM	20	16	Ret	Ret	19	15	16	14	Ret	Ret	11	25	18	15	14	Ret	27	25	Ret	26	17	19	12	Ret					Ret	Ret	20	22	22	17	Ret	DNS	72
28	766	(Austria) Michael Sandner	Gas Gas																	15	Ret	17	24	15	15	19	19	24	Ret	16	23	21	23	14	13	15	13	19	16	67
29	101	(Italy) Mattia Guadagnini	Husqvarna	15	12									15	8	6	8																							62
30	516	(Germany) Simon Längenfelder	Gas Gas	29	30	21	5	Ret	21	9	12	13	22	12	16	Ret	DNS																							59
31	313	(Czech Republic) Petr Polák	Yamaha	37	Ret	Ret	19	27	17	Ret	Ret	23	13	20	Ret													26	20	18	17	19	18	21	20	25	15	17	15	45
32	104	(Germany) Jeremy Sydow	Gas Gas	12	15	14	8							Ret	DNS																									35
33	75	(Estonia) Hardi Roosiorg	KTM	27	23	15	15	18	19	20	15	18	15																											33
34	12	(United States) Mitchell Harrison	Kawasaki	25	14	10	17																																	22
35	20	(Australia) Wilson Todd	Kawasaki	21	13	Ret	DNS																													21	16	21	13	21
36	209	(Italy) Gianmarco Cenerelli	Husqvarna											14	20	13	16																							21
37	783	(France) Enzo Toriani	Husqvarna			29	Ret	25	Ret	24	19	Ret	19	21	21	24	19	19	18	24	21	25	18	18	17															21
38	258	(Estonia) Johannes Nermann	Husqvarna					Ret	Ret	26	21	Ret	18	26	24	27	26	26	24	28	22	24	16	25	22			22	21	Ret	18	18	19	27	25	24	22	24	20	17
39	115	(United Kingdom) Ashton Dickinson	KTM	33	32	31	27	Ret	22	23	20	22	Ret	24	23	22	Ret	23	23	23	26	23	25	20	20	14	20	25	19	19	Ret	23	24							15
40	192	(Denmark) Glen Meier	Yamaha	35	25									22	Ret	21	25	24	DNS	22	27	21	23	16	Ret			20	Ret	20	22	20	20	24	Ret	23	20	23	18	13
41	224	(Czech Republic) Jakub Terešák	KTM					23	23	22	18	20	17	Ret	DNS											21	21							22	21	Ret	21	18	19	13
42	200	(Italy) Filippo Zonta	KTM	28	21	30	21													19	20	26	21	22	18															6
43	109	(Austria) Roland Edelbacher	Husqvarna	31	28	22	16																																	5
44	275	(Italy) Joakin Furbetta	KTM	Ret	33	24	Ret	Ret	Ret	28	23	21	Ret	18	Ret	Ret	Ret			26	Ret	Ret	Ret	Ret	DNS									Ret	DNS	26	25	22	Ret	3
45	707	(Germany) Maximilian Spies	Husqvarna											23	22	26	22	22	19															Ret	DNS					2
46	142	(Finland) Jere Haavisto	Yamaha			Ret	DNS	Ret	Ret	25	24	19	Ret																											2
	470	(Germany) Peter König	KTM																									23	22	Ret	21									0
	443	(Finland) Matias Vesterinen	KTM					26	24	Ret	Ret	24	21	25	26	23	24			Ret	28																			0
	184	(United Kingdom) James Carpenter	Husqvarna			26	23																									Ret	21							0
	182	(Republic of Ireland) Jake Sheridan	KTM																									27	24	21	24	24	25							0
	67	(Spain) Yago Martínez	Yamaha																							22	22													0
	18	(Italy) Leonardo Angeli	KTM																															29	Ret	27	Ret	25	22	0
	460	(Belgium) Lucas Adam	KTM															25	22																					0
	801	(Belgium) Jordi Van Miegham	Kawasaki																													22	Ret							0
	324	(France) Maxime Charlier	Husqvarna											27	27									26	23															0
	211	(Italy) Nicholas Lapucci	KTM	24	Ret	Ret	DNS																																	0
	16	(United Kingdom) Tom Grimshaw	Husqvarna	36	34	27	25																																	0
	48	(United Kingdom) Adam Collings	KTM																													25	Ret							0
	518	(France) François Doré	KTM																															28	26					0
	575	(United Kingdom) Taylor Hammal	Yamaha	26	31																																			0
	50	(Spain) Oriol Oliver	KTM																															26	Ret					0
	614	(Belgium) Glenn Bielen	KTM																									28	Ret											0
Pos	No.	Rider	Bike	GBR (United Kingdom)		NED (Netherlands)		LAT (Latvia)		RIG		KEG		ITA (Italy)		CDF (Italy)		EMR		LOM		CDM (Italy)		EUR (European Union)		ESP (Spain)		FLA (Flanders)		LIM (Limburg (Belgium))		LOM		TRE		PIE (Italy)		GAR (Italy)		Points

=== Manufacturers Championship ===
Pos	Bike	GBR (United Kingdom)		NED (Netherlands)		LAT (Latvia)		RIG		KEG		ITA (Italy)		CDF (Italy)		EMR		LOM		CDM (Italy)		EUR (European Union)		ESP (Spain)		FLA (Flanders)		LIM (Limburg (Belgium))		LOM		TRE		PIE (Italy)		GAR (Italy)		Points
1	Yamaha	1	4	1	3	3	1	1	1	2	1	1	1	2	4	1	2	3	2	2	5	2	1	5	1	1	1	1	2	1	4	4	1	3	1	2	1	810
2	KTM	4	1	2	1	1	2	4	4	1	2	4	2	1	1	2	1	1	3	3	1	1	2	1	2	2	2	2	1	3	6	2	3	1	10	1	5	786
3	Husqvarna	2	5	6	2	10	6	5	6	7	6	6	6	4	2	3	3	2	1	1	2	4	4	2	7	5	4	7	6	5	3	1	4	2	4	7	2	655
4	Kawasaki	3	3	9	10	2	3	2	2	4	3	3	4	5	13	6	4	4	6	5	3	11	7	8	3	10	3	Ret	3	6	1	9	8	9	16	9	13	561
5	Honda	17	10	17	11	8	8	10	10	8	10	7	11	7	5	8	8	8	7	14	7	12	14	7	9	8	11	6	11	12	9	11	14	10	7	5	8	411
6	Gas Gas	12	15	14	5	Ret	21	9	12	13	22	12	16	Ret	DNS			9	10	10	8	7	15	11	8	6	8	5	5	8	2	7	7	15	13	6	3	343
Pos	Bike	GBR (United Kingdom)		NED (Netherlands)		LAT (Latvia)		RIG		KEG		ITA (Italy)		CDF (Italy)		EMR		LOM		CDM (Italy)		EUR (European Union)		ESP (Spain)		FLA (Flanders)		LIM (Limburg (Belgium))		LOM		TRE		PIE (Italy)		GAR (Italy)		Points
