= 2020 Motocross des Nations =

The 2020 Motocross des Nations was going to be a motocross race that was to be held on 27 and 28 September 2020 in Ernée, France. However, on 29 July 2021, it was announced that the event had been cancelled due to the COVID-19 pandemic.

== Entry list ==
Start numbers are allocated based on the team finish from the previous year's competition. The Netherlands are the reigning champions so their riders would have been given numbers 1, 2 and 3. That will carry forward into the 2021 MXoN.
