= Arminas Jasikonis =

Lithuanian motocross racer

- Nationality: Lithuanian
- Born: 12 September 1997 (age 29); Anykščiai, Lithuania

Arminas Jasikonis (born 12 September 1997) is a Lithuanian former professional Motocross racer. Jasikonis competed in the FIM Motocross World Championship from 2016 to 2023. During his career he was a factory rider for Suzuki and Husqvarna, with his highest overall result in the final standings being seventh during the 2019 season.

During the 2020 FIM Motocross World Championship season, Jasikonis became the first Lithuanian rider to win a race at FIM World Championship level.

In the same 2020 season, Jasikonis had a crash whilst racing at the Mantua track, which resulted in him being put into a medically induced coma due to a traumatic brain injury. Despite waking from the coma after three days and being able to recover quickly enough to race the following season, Jasikonis never reached the same heights following this crash.

Jasikonis represented Lithuania at the Motocross des Nations on seven occasions, including the 2021 edition where the country recorded its highest ever finish.

== Career ==
=== Junior career ===
Jasikonis first rode a motocross bike at the age of four and in his formative years competed in the sport under the guidance of his father Rolandas. He was able to win two consecutive Lithuanian Championships on a 50cc motorcycle and finished in the top-three for two years running after moving up to a 65cc motorcycle. After becoming Lithuanian champion in the 85cc class in 2009, Jasikonis moved to Estonia in 2010 to train with former Grand Prix winner Avo Leok. This move saw him compete more widely across Europe, finishing eighth in the EMX85 class of the European Motocross Championship and riding in the FIM Motocross Junior World Championship for the first time. His results in the EMX85 class improved in the 2011 season, where he took two race wins and one overall win to finish third in the final standings.

For the 2012 season, Jasikonis moved up to compete on a 125cc motorcycle in the United Kingdom as part of the Route77 Energy team. Additionally, he competed in the EMX125 class of the European Championship, finishing twenty-second in the final standings with a notable result of fifth in the opening race at the Belgian round. Jasikonis also scored three points in the 125 class of the FIM Motocross Junior World Championship in Bulgaria. At the end of the season, he represented Lithuania at the Motocross of European Nations, where the team finished sixth.

=== 250 career ===
After a single season on a 125, Jasikonis moved up to compete on a 250cc motorcycle in 2013. Maintaining the support of Route77 Energy, he joined the MVRD team to compete in the MX2 class of the British Motocross Championship. Despite missing several rounds due to injury, he finished twelfth in the final standings, with a best race finish of sixth achieved at the final round. He made several outings in the EMX125 class during the season and at the end of the year represented his country at the Motocross des Nations for the first time, competing in the Open class.

The 2014 season saw Jasikonis move to live in Belgium full-time and compete in the Youngster Cup class of the ADAC MX Masters for the Steel Mustang Racing Team. He finished fourth in the final standings of the German series, with two overall podiums being his best results. Riding at the final round of the EMX250 class of the European Championship, he finished seventh overall and at the end of the season he represented his country at the Motocross des Nations for the second time. This would be the only time he raced in the MX2 class for his country, finishing twelfth in his qualifying race and fifth in the B Final that Lithuania would not qualify from. Jasikonis spent a second season racing in the Youngster Cup in 2015, where he competed for the Monster Energy Kawasaki Elf Team Pfeil squad. This would see him take two overall victories in the class and two other podiums to finish third in the final standings despite missing two rounds due to injury. Jasikonis made his third consecutive appearance for Lithuania at the Motocross des Nations in 2015, where the team did not qualify again despite him finishing a distant second to Tim Gajser in the B Final.

=== 450 career ===
Jasikonis stayed with the Pfeil Kawasaki team for 2016, but stepped up to ride a 450. Early in the season, he made his World Championship debut by competing in the MXGP class at the third round of the 2016 FIM Motocross World Championship. After scoring two points in this outing, he made two further appearances in Germany and Latvia, picking up further points on both occasions. Suzuki World MXGP team manager Stefan Everts was impressed by his performances and when Ben Townley picked up a season-ending injury Jasikonis was signed to replace him for the rest of the year. Across the six rounds he competed in, he scored two top-ten race finishes, with a best of seventh in the second race in Assen. For the first time as a factory rider, Jasikonis represented his country at the 2016 Motocross des Nations, where the team finished nineteenth overall.

Following these results, Jasikonis competed in his first full season on the factory Suzuki team for the 2017 FIM Motocross World Championship. The opportunity to have a full season on the team saw his results improve significantly, culminating in a podium in Portugal with third overall after winning the qualifying race at the same round. At the seventeenth round in Jacksonville, Florida, Jasikonis dislocated his hip which saw him miss the remainder of the season. He was contracted to continue with the factory Suzuki team in the 2018 FIM Motocross World Championship, however, the manufacturer pulled out of MXGP before the start of the season. Late on in the pre-season he was able to join the Assomotor Honda team. After scoring three top-ten finishes across the first twelve rounds, he missed the second half of the season due to injury.

The 2019 FIM Motocross World Championship saw Jasikonis join the Rockstar Energy Husqvarna Factory Racing team. The return to factory equipment saw him become a consistent top-ten finisher, with some notable results including a third place race finish at the opening race in Mantua. Consistency throughout the season saw him finish seventh in the final standings of the MXGP class and outside of the World Championship he would win the 500cc class of the Dutch Masters of Motocross championship. After missing the previous two years, he returned to represent his country at the 2019 Motocross des Nations, however he did not compete in the event after the practice sessions due to injury. Jasikonis continued his good form into the COVID-19 pandemic-hit 2020 FIM Motocross World Championship season, securing his second ever podium at round two in The Netherlands. The championship returned from its pandemic-enforced break with consecutive rounds at the Ķegums track in Latvia. At the second of these, Jasikonis was able to achieve the feat of being the first Lithuanian rider ever to win a Motocross World Championship race in the second moto. At the third of the rounds in Latvia, he was able to secure his second podium of the campaign with second overall. Four rounds later, Jasikonis suffered a huge crash at the Mantua track which left him with a traumatic brain injury. Following this he was placed in a medically induced coma that he woke from three days later.

Despite the severity of the injury, Jasikonis was able to return to compete for the Rockstar Energy Husqvarna team for the 2021 FIM Motocross World Championship. After missing four rounds of the season, his best results were three top-ten race finishes, which included a sixth in the second moto at Lommel. Additionally, he competed at the 2021 Motocross des Nations for Lithuania, where he was part of the team that recorded the country's highest overall finish in the competition to date by finishing thirteenth. With his contract with Husqvarna coming to an end, Jasikonis joined the Gebben Van Venrooy Yamaha Racing for the 2022 FIM Motocross World Championship. He endured a tough campaign and by mid-season had only been able to start at four rounds of the series due to injuries. Taking into account these issues and his recovery since the crash in the 2020 season, Jasikonis decided to retire from competing at the highest level of the sport full-time. Later in the year, he competed again for his country at the 2022 Motocross des Nations, where the team did not qualify for the main races.

Jasikonis continued racing into the 2023 season, joining the Millionaire Racing Team - ABF Italia squad to race in the Italian Prestige Motocross Championship and selected rounds of the 2023 FIM Motocross World Championship. He recorded three top-three race finishes in the Italian Championship to finish seventh in the standings and scored one point across three appearances in MXGP.

Following the end of the 2023 season, Jasikonis announced his retirement from the sport.

== Honours ==
European Motocross Championship

- EMX85: 2011 (bronze)

ADAC MX Masters

- Youngster Cup: 2015 (bronze)

Dutch Masters of Motocross

- 500cc: 2019 (gold)

Lithuanian Motocross Championship

- 65cc: 2007 (silver) , 2006 (bronze)
- 50cc: 2004 & 2005 (gold)

== Career statistics ==
=== Motocross des Nations ===
| Year | Location | Nation | Class | Teammates | Team Overall | Individual Overall |
|---|---|---|---|---|---|---|
| 2013 | (Germany) Teutschenthal | LTU | Open | Vytautas Bucas; Matas Inda | 26th | N/A |
| 2014 | (Latvia) Ķegums | LTU | MX2 | Arunas Gelazninkas; Nerijus Rukstela | 24th | N/A |
| 2015 | (France) Ernée | LTU | Open | Nerijus Rukstela; Vytautas Bucas | 25th | N/A |
| 2016 | (Italy) Maggiora | LTU | Open | Vytautas Bucas; Dovydas Karka | 19th | 17th |
| 2019 | (Netherlands) Assen | LTU | MXGP | Dovydas Karka; Domantas Jazdauskas | 28th | N/A |
| 2021 | (Italy) Mantua | LTU | Open | Dovydas Karka; Erlandas Mackonis | 13th | 5th |
| 2022 | (United States) RedBud | LTU | Open | Domantas Jazdauskas; Dovydas Karka | 22nd | N/A |

=== FIM Motocross World Championship ===
==== By season ====
| Season | Class | Number | Motorcycle | Team | Race | Race Wins | Overall Wins | Race Top-3 | Overall Podium | Pts | Plcd |
|---|---|---|---|---|---|---|---|---|---|---|---|
| 2016 | MXGP | 177 | Kawasaki | Team Pfeil Kawasaki | 6 | 0 | 0 | 0 | 0 | 51 | 24th |
| 2016 | MXGP | 177 | Suzuki | Suzuki World MXGP | 12 | 0 | 0 | 0 | 0 | 51 | 24th |
| 2017 | MXGP | 27 | Suzuki | Suzuki World MXGP | 30 | 0 | 0 | 3 | 1 | 283 | 13th |
| 2018 | MXGP | 27 | Honda | Team Honda RedMoto Assomotor | 20 | 0 | 0 | 0 | 0 | 111 | 19th |
| 2019 | MXGP | 27 | Husqvarna | Rockstar Energy Husqvarna Factory Racing Team | 36 | 0 | 0 | 1 | 0 | 442 | 7th |
| 2020 | MXGP | 27 | Husqvarna | Rockstar Energy Husqvarna Factory Racing Team | 18 | 1 | 0 | 5 | 2 | 248 | 13th |
| 2021 | MXGP | 7 | Husqvarna | Rockstar Energy Husqvarna Factory Racing Team | 26 | 0 | 0 | 0 | 0 | 103 | 22nd |
| 2022 | MXGP | 7 | Yamaha | Gebben Van Venrooy Yamaha Racing | 7 | 0 | 0 | 0 | 0 | 6 | 44th |
| 2023 | MXGP | 2 | Gas Gas | Millionaire Racing Team - ABF Italia | 5 | 0 | 0 | 0 | 0 | 1 | 67th |
| Total | | | | | 160 | 1 | 0 | 9 | 3 | 1245 | |
