= 2019 Motocross des Nations =

The 2019 Motocross des Nations was a motocross race held on 28 September and 29 September 2019 at the Assen circuit, in The Netherlands. Motocross des Nations was last held in The Netherlands in 2004 but never at this venue.

France went into the event as the defending champions after taking their sixth title in 2018. However, it was The Netherlands who took victory in front of their home fans which marked the first Dutch win in the 73-year history of the event.

== Entry list ==
Start numbers are allocated based on the team finish from the previous year's edition. France are the reigning champions so they start with numbers 1, 2 and 3.

The official entry list was published on 3 September.

A total of 34 nations competed, up 4 from 2018. Canada, Venezuela, Argentina, Mexico, Guatemala, Philippines and Israel did not send teams after competing in 2018. Slovenia, Russia, Latvia, Croatia, Lithuania, Denmark, Luxembourg, Greece, Norway and Poland all returned for the first time since 2017, while Cyprus returned for the first time since 2009.

A number of teams made changes to their lineups before the publishing of the official entry list. 2015 MXGP world champion Romain Febvre was initially chosen to be #3 for France but had to be replaced by Jordi Tixier after breaking a femur at the MXGP of Sweden. In addition, Tom Vialle was originally chosen to be #2 for Team France, but was subsequently replaced by Maxime Renaux following a disagreement between Vialle and the French federation surrounding the wearing of apparel featuring a personal sponsor.

Neither Max Anstie or Ben Watson competed for Great Britain due to injuries sustained racing in the world championships. They were replaced by Enduro rider and sand specialist Nathan Watson and Adam Sterry. Mitchell Evans had to pull out of the event due to ongoing medical concerns, his place on Team Australia taken by 17-year old Regan Duffy. Henry Jacobi was initially confirmed as #26 for Germany, but had to be replaced by Simon Längenfelder after damaging a cruciate ligament.

Gustavo Pessoa had to withdraw from Team Brazil and was replaced by Pepe Bueno, whilst a hand injury picked up at the final grand prix of the year meant Arnaud Tonus was replaced by Cyrill Scheiwiller for Switzerland.Henrik Wahl was replaced by Cornelius Tøndel for Norway due to an illness.

Kawasaki declined to allow its factory riders Eli Tomac and Adam Cianciarulo to enter the competition.

	Country	Nr	Rider	Class	Motorcycle
1	France	1	Gautier Paulin	MXGP	Yamaha
1	France	2	Maxime Renaux	MX2	Yamaha
1	France	3	Jordi Tixier	Open	KTM
2	Netherlands	4	Jeffrey Herlings	MXGP	KTM
2	Netherlands	5	Calvin Vlaanderen	MX2	Honda
2	Netherlands	6	Glenn Coldenhoff	Open	KTM
3	(United Kingdom) Great Britain	7	Nathan Watson	MXGP	KTM
3	(United Kingdom) Great Britain	8	Adam Sterry	MX2	Kawasaki
3	(United Kingdom) Great Britain	9	Shaun Simpson	Open	KTM
4	Australia	10	Dean Ferris	MXGP	KTM
4	Australia	11	Kyle Webster	MX2	Honda
4	Australia	12	Regan Duffy	Open	KTM
5	United States	13	Jason Anderson	MXGP	Husqvarna
5	United States	14	Justin Cooper	MX2	Yamaha
5	United States	15	Zach Osborne	Open	Husqvarna
6	Belgium	16	Jeremy Van Horebeek	MXGP	Honda
6	Belgium	17	Jago Geerts	MX2	Yamaha
6	Belgium	18	Kevin Strijbos	Open	Yamaha
7	Spain	19	Jorge Prado	MXGP	KTM
7	Spain	20	Iker Larrañaga	MX2	KTM
7	Spain	21	Carlos Campano	Open	Yamaha
8	Estonia	22	Tanel Leok	MXGP	Husqvarna
8	Estonia	23	Priit Rätsep	MX2	Honda
8	Estonia	24	Harri Kullas	Open	Honda
9	Germany	25	Tom Koch	MXGP	KTM
9	Germany	26	Simon Längenfelder	MX2	KTM
9	Germany	27	Dennis Ullrich	Open	Husqvarna
10	Sweden	31	Filip Bengtsson	MXGP	Husqvarna
10	Sweden	32	Alvin Östlund	MX2	Husqvarna
10	Sweden	33	Anton Gole	Open	Yamaha
11	Austria	34	Lukas Neurauter	MXGP	KTM
11	Austria	35	Rene Hofer	MX2	KTM
11	Austria	36	Michael Sandner	Open	KTM
12	(Republic of Ireland) Ireland	37	Jason Meara	MXGP	Kawasaki
12	(Republic of Ireland) Ireland	38	Martin Barr	MX2	Yamaha
12	(Republic of Ireland) Ireland	39	Stuart Edmonds	Open	Husqvarna
13	Czech Republic	43	Václav Kovář	MXGP	KTM
13	Czech Republic	44	Petr Polák	MX2	KTM
13	Czech Republic	45	Filip Neugebauer	Open	KTM
14	Brazil	46	Fabio Santos	MXGP	Yamaha
14	Brazil	47	Pepe Bueno	MX2	Yamaha
14	Brazil	48	Ramyller Alves	Open	KTM
15	New Zealand	49	Wyatt Chase	MXGP	Honda
15	New Zealand	50	Dylan Walsh	MX2	Husqvarna
15	New Zealand	51	Maximus Purvis	Open	Yamaha
16	Puerto Rico	52	Justin Starling	MXGP	Suzuki
16	Puerto Rico	53	Jose Fernando Rodriguez	MX2	Kawasaki
16	Puerto Rico	54	Chase Marquier	Open	Kawasaki
17	Switzerland	55	Jeremy Seewer	MXGP	Yamaha
17	Switzerland	56	Valentin Guillod	MX2	Honda
17	Switzerland	57	Cyrill Scheiwiller	Open	Yamaha
18	Portugal	58	Sandro Peixe	MXGP	Suzuki
18	Portugal	59	Luis Outeiro	MX2	KTM
18	Portugal	60	Hugo Basaula	Open	KTM
19	Japan	61	Akira Narita	MXGP	Honda
19	Japan	62	Gota Otsuka	MX2	Honda
19	Japan	63	Toshiki Tomita	Open	Honda
20	South Africa	67	Michael Docherty	MXGP	KTM
20	South Africa	68	Anthony Raynard	MX2	Yamaha
20	South Africa	69	Lloyd Vercueil	Open	Yamaha
21	Iceland	70	Ingvi Birgisson	MXGP	KTM
21	Iceland	71	Einar Sigurdsson	MX2	KTM
21	Iceland	72	Eythor Reynisson	Open	Yamaha
22	Ukraine	76	Roman Morozov	MXGP	Yamaha
22	Ukraine	77	Oleg Kruk	MX2	Yamaha
22	Ukraine	78	Volodymyr Tarasov	Open	KTM
23	Italy	88	Ivo Monticelli	MXGP	KTM
23	Italy	89	Alberto Forato	MX2	Husqvarna
23	Italy	90	Alessandro Lupino	Open	Kawasaki
24	Slovenia	91	Tim Gajser	MXGP	Honda
24	Slovenia	92	Jan Pancar	MX2	Yamaha
24	Slovenia	93	Peter Irt	Open	Yamaha
25	Russia	94	Vsevolod Brylyakov	MXGP	Yamaha
25	Russia	95	Timur Petrashin	MX2	KTM
25	Russia	96	Svyatoslav Pronenko	Open	Husqvarna
26	Latvia	97	Toms Macuks	MXGP	KTM
26	Latvia	98	Davis Ivanovs	MX2	Husqvarna
26	Latvia	99	Pauls Jonass	Open	Husqvarna
27	Croatia	100	Luka Crnkovic	MXGP	Honda
27	Croatia	101	Nikola Hranic	MX2	KTM
27	Croatia	102	Matija Kelava	Open	KTM
28	Lithuania	103	Arminas Jasikonis	MXGP	Husqvarna
28	Lithuania	104	Dovydas Karka	MX2	KTM
28	Lithuania	105	Domantas Jazdauskas	Open	Husqvarna
29	Denmark	106	Stefan Kjær Olsen	MXGP	KTM
29	Denmark	107	Thomas Kjær Olsen	MX2	Husqvarna
29	Denmark	108	Bastian Bøgh Damm	Open	KTM
30	Cyprus	109	Christos Tsangaras	MXGP	Yamaha
30	Cyprus	110	Aristos Georgiou	MX2	Yamaha
30	Cyprus	111	Chrysanthos Georgiou	Open	Yamaha
31	Luxembourg	112	Bjorn Frank	MXGP	Honda
31	Luxembourg	113	Yves Frank	MX2	Honda
31	Luxembourg	114	Dylan de Figueiredo	Open	Honda
32	Greece	115	Emmanouil Kritikos	MXGP	Yamaha
32	Greece	116	Alexandros Georgantas	MX2	Husqvarna
32	Greece	117	Andreas Andreous	Open	Yamaha
33	Norway	118	Håkon Fredriksen	MXGP	Yamaha
33	Norway	119	Kevin Horgmo	MX2	KTM
33	Norway	120	Henrik Wahl	Open	KTM
34	Poland	121	Tomasz Wysocki	MXGP	KTM
34	Poland	122	Maciej Wieckowski	MX2	KTM
34	Poland	123	Szymon Staszkiewicz	Open	KTM
	Country	Nr	Rider	Class	Motorcycle

== Practice ==
Practice is run on a class by class basis.

=== MXGP ===
Place	Nr	Rider	Motorcycle	Time	Difference
1	4	(Netherlands) Herlings	KTM	1:41.803	
2	16	(Belgium) Van Horebeek	Honda	1:42.957	+1.154
3	19	(Spain) Prado	KTM	1:43.001	+1.198
4	7	(United Kingdom) Watson	KTM	1:43.635	+1.832
5	55	(Switzerland) Seewer	Yamaha	1:43.861	+2.058
6	91	(Slovenia) Gajser	Honda	1:44.580	+2.777
7	1	(France) Paulin	Yamaha	1:44.728	+2.925
8	88	(Italy) Monticelli	KTM	1:45.409	+3.606
9	25	(Germany) Koch	KTM	1:46.177	+4.374
10	22	(Estonia) Leok	Husqvarna	1:46.409	+4.606
11	31	(Sweden) Bengtsson	Husqvarna	1:46.450	+4.647
12	97	(Latvia) Macuks	KTM	1:47.051	+5.248
13	118	(Norway) Fredriksen	Yamaha	1:47.260	+5.457
14	121	(Poland) Wysocki	KTM	1:48.214	+6.411
15	13	(United States) Anderson	Husqvarna	1:46.870*	+5.067*
16	52	(Puerto Rico) Starling	Suzuki	1:48.515	+6.712
17	94	(Russia) Brylyakov	Yamaha	1:48.670	+6.867
18	67	(South Africa) Docherty	KTM	1:48.764	+6.961
19	10	(Australia) Ferris	KTM	1:48.878	+7.075
20	106	(Denmark) Kjær Olsen	KTM	1:49.154	+7.351
21	103	(Lithuania) Jasikonis	Husqvarna	1:49.460	+7.657
22	49	(New Zealand) Chase	Honda	1:51.281	+9.478
23	46	(Brazil) Santos	Yamaha	1:51.381	+9.578
24	43	(Czech Republic) Kovar	KTM	1:51.426	+9.623
25	58	(Portugal) Peixe	Suzuki	1:51.638	+9.835
26	34	(Austria) Naurauter	KTM	1:52.928	+11.125
27	61	(Japan) Narita	Honda	1:55.430	+13.627
28	37	(Republic of Ireland) Meara	Kawasaki	1:55.711	+13.908
29	70	(Iceland) Birgisson	KTM	1:57.030	+15.227
30	100	(Croatia) Crnkovic	Honda	1:57.298	+15.495
31	115	(Greece) Kritikos	Yamaha	1:57.386	+15.583
32	76	(Ukraine) Morozov	Yamaha	2:00.315	+18.512
33	112	(Luxembourg) Frank	Honda	2:08.924	+27.121
34	109	(Cyprus) Tsangaras	Yamaha	2:11.740	+29.937
Place	Nr	Rider	Motorcycle	Time	Difference

- Jason Anderson was docked 3 positions

=== MX2 ===
Place	Nr	Rider	Motorcycle	Time	Difference
1	14	(United States) Cooper	Yamaha	1:44.803	
2	5	(Netherlands) Vlaanderen	Honda	1:45.451	+0.648
3	119	(Norway) Horgmo	KTM	1:46.810	+2.007
4	17	(Belgium) Geerts	Yamaha	1:47.095	+2.292
5	107	(Denmark) Kjær Olsen	Husqvarna	1:48.036	+3.233
6	8	(United Kingdom) Sterry	Kawasaki	1:48.107	+3.304
7	89	(Italy) Forato	Husqvarna	1:48.444	+3.641
8	32	(Sweden) Östlund	Husqvarna	1:48.562	+3.759
9	11	(Australia) Webster	Honda	1:49.168	+4.365
10	50	(New Zealand) Walsh	Husqvarna	1:49.798	+4.995
11	20	(Spain) Larrañaga	KTM	1:49.818	+5.015
12	35	(Austria) Hofer	KTM	1:49.879	+5.076
13	26	(Germany) Längenfelder	KTM	1:50.051	+5.248
14	23	(Estonia) Rätsep	Honda	1:50.075	+5.272
15	2	(France) Renaux	Yamaha	1:50.336	+5.533
16	56	(Switzerland) Guillod	Honda	1:51.146	+6.343
17	38	(Republic of Ireland) Barr	Yamaha	1:51.597	+6.794
18	95	(Russia) Petrashin	KTM	1:52.651	+7.848
19	104	(Lithuania) Karka	KTM	1:53.361	+8.558
20	92	(Slovenia) Pancar	Yamaha	1:53.456	+8.653
21	47	(Brazil) Bueno	Yamaha	1:53.318*	+8.515*
22	98	(Latvia) Ivanovs	Husqvarna	1:53.577	+8.774
23	59	(Portugal) Outeiro	KTM	1:54.360	+9.557
24	122	(Poland) Wieckowski	KTM	1:54.911	+10.108
25	44	(Czech Republic) Polak	KTM	1:55.103	+10.300
26	62	(Japan) Otsuka	Honda	1:57.023	+12.220
27	68	(South Africa) Raynard	Yamaha	1:57.124	+12.321
28	71	(Iceland) Sigurdsson	KTM	2:01.924	+17.121
29	77	(Ukraine) Kruk	Yamaha	2:03.911	+19.108
30	101	(Croatia) Hranic	KTM	2:04.927	+20.124
31	116	(Greece) Georgantas	Husqvarna	2:08.252	+23.449
32	53	(Puerto Rico) Rodriguez	Kawasaki	2:20.623	+35.820
33	110	(Cyprus) Georgiou	Yamaha	2:20.734	+35.931
34	113	(Luxembourg) Frank	Honda	2:37.488	+52.685
Place	Nr	Rider	Motorcycle	Time	Difference

- Pepe Bueno was docked 2 positions

=== Open ===
Place	Nr	Rider	Motorcycle	Time	Difference
1	6	(Netherlands) Coldenhoff	KTM	1:44.239	
2	18	(Belgium) Strijbos	Yamaha	1:44.761	+0.522
3	99	(Latvia) Jonass	Husqvarna	1:44.774	+0.535
4	9	(United Kingdom) Simpson	KTM	1:45.478	+1.239
5	3	(France) Tixier	KTM	1:45.677	+1.438
6	15	(United States) Osborne	Husqvarna	1:46.239	+2.000
7	24	(Estonia) Kullas	Honda	1:46.441	+2.202
8	90	(Italy) Lupino	Kawasaki	1:48.463	+4.224
9	12	(Australia) Duffy	KTM	1:48.926	+4.687
10	108	(Denmark) Bøgh Damm	KTM	1:49.945	+5.706
11	33	(Sweden) Gole	Yamaha	1:50.350	+6.111
12	21	(Spain) Campano	Yamaha	1:50.629	+6.390
13	120	(Norway) Wahl	KTM	1:51.233	+6.994
14	27	(Germany) Ullrich	Husqvarna	1:51.239	+7.000
15	69	(South Africa) Vercueil	Yamaha	1:51.795	+7.556
16	45	(Czech Republic) Neugebauer	KTM	1:51.998	+7.759
17	48	(Brazil) Alves	KTM	1:52.369	+8.130
18	36	(Austria) Sandner	KTM	1:52.835	+8.596
19	63	(Japan) Tomita	Honda	1:52.910	+8.671
20	72	(Iceland) Reynisson	Yamaha	1:53.194	+8.955
21	123	(Poland) Staszkiewicz	KTM	1:53.238	+8.999
22	96	(Russia) Pronenko	Husqvarna	1:53.522	+9.283
23	51	(New Zealand) Purvis	Yamaha	1:53.552	+9.313
24	60	(Portugal) Basaula	KTM	1:49.814*	+5.575*
25	93	(Slovenia) Irt	Yamaha	1:54.536	+10.297
26	39	(Republic of Ireland) Edmonds	Husqvarna	1:55.063	+10.824
27	105	(Lithuania) Jazdauskas	Husqvarna	1:55.150	+10.911
28	78	(Ukraine) Tarasov	KTM	1:55.229	+10.990
29	54	(Puerto Rico) Marquier	Kawasaki	1:55.419	+11.180
30	57	(Switzerland) Scheiwiller	Yamaha	1:56.341	+12.102
31	102	(Croatia) Kelava	KTM	1:58.113	+13.874
32	117	(Greece) Andreou	Yamaha	2:06.783	+22.544
33	111	(Cyprus) Georgiou	Yamaha	2:10.029	+25.790
34	114	(Luxembourg) de Figueiredo	Honda	2:36.173	+51.934
Place	Nr	Rider	Motorcycle	Time	Difference

- Hugo Basaula was docked 14 positions.

== Qualifying Races ==
Qualifying is run on a class by class basis. Top 19 countries after qualifying go directly to the main Motocross des Nations races. The remaining countries go to a smaller final. Best 2 scores count.

=== MXGP ===
Place	Nr	Rider	Motorcycle	Laps	Gap
1	55	(Switzerland) Seewer	Yamaha	13	
2	91	(Slovenia) Gajser	Honda	13	+7.400
3	16	(Belgium) Van Horebeek	Honda	13	+13.371
4	19	(Spain) Prado	KTM	13	+22.859
5	4	(Netherlands) Herlings	KTM	13	+23.401
6	13	(United States) Anderson	Husqvarna	13	+30.482
7	31	(Sweden) Bengtsson	Husqvarna	13	+52.693
8	1	(France) Paulin	Yamaha	13	+56.200
9	88	(Italy) Monticelli	KTM	13	+1:06.932
10	10	(Australia) Ferris	KTM	13	+1:08.158
11	7	(United Kingdom) Watson	KTM	13	+1:08.967
12	22	(Estonia) Leok	Husqvarna	13	+1:22.433
13	97	(Latvia) Macuks	KTM	13	+1:25.751
14	118	(Norway) Fredriksen	Yamaha	13	+1:26.413
15	106	(Denmark) Kjær Olsen	KTM	13	+1:37.185
16	25	(Germany) Koch	KTM	13	+1:46.025
17	52	(Puerto Rico) Starling	Suzuki	13	+1:52.733
18	67	(South Africa) Docherty	KTM	13	+1:55.339
19	49	(New Zealand) Chase	Honda	13	+2:01.350
20	43	(Czech Republic) Kovar	KTM	12	+1 Lap
21	46	(Brazil) Santos	Yamaha	12	+1 Lap
22	94	(Russia) Brylyakov	Yamaha	12	+1 Lap
23	34	(Austria) Neurauter	KTM	12	+1 Lap
24	121	(Poland) Wysocki	KTM	12	+1 Lap
25	70	(Iceland) Birgisson	KTM	12	+1 Lap
26	115	(Greece) Kritikos	Yamaha	12	+1 Lap
27	58	(Portugal) Peixe	Suzuki	12	+1 Lap
28	76	(Ukraine) Morozov	Yamaha	11	+2 Laps
29	112	(Luxembourg) Frank	Honda	11	+2 Laps
30	109	(Cyprus) Tsangaras	Yamaha	11	+2 Laps
31	37	(Republic of Ireland) Meara	Kawasaki	10	+3 Laps
32	100	(Croatia) Crnkovic	Honda	6	Did Not Finish
33	61	(Japan) Narita	Honda	4	Did Not Finish
	103	(Lithuania) Jasikonis	Husqvarna	0	Did Not Start

=== MX2 ===
Place	Nr	Rider	Motorcycle	Laps	Gap
1	14	(United States) Cooper	Yamaha	13	
2	5	(Netherlands) Vlaanderen	Honda	13	+6.220
3	11	(Australia) Webster	Honda	13	+17.699
4	17	(Belgium) Geerts	Yamaha	13	+20.272
5	89	(Italy) Forato	Husqvarna	13	+20.710
6	107	(Denmark) Kjær Olsen	Husqvarna	13	+23.292
7	50	(New Zealand) Walsh	Husqvarna	13	+28.409
8	119	(Norway) Horgmo	KTM	13	+33.692
9	32	(Sweden) Östlund	Husqvarna	13	+46.518
10	2	(France) Renaux	Yamaha	13	+51.165
11	35	(Austria) Hofer	KTM	13	+55.692
12	26	(Germany) Längenfelder	KTM	13	+57.536
13	8	(United Kingdom) Sterry	Kawasaki	13	+58.936
14	56	(Switzerland) Guillod	Honda	13	+1:12.037
15	38	(Republic of Ireland) Barr	Yamaha	13	+1:36.153
16	98	(Latvia) Ivanovs	Husqvarna	13	+1:49.801
17	44	(Czech Republic) Polak	KTM	13	+1:57.119
18	20	(Spain) Larrañaga	KTM	13	+1:58.592
19	23	(Estonia) Rätsep	Honda	13	+2:04.074
20	92	(Slovenia) Pancar	Yamaha	12	+1 Lap
21	104	(Lithuania) Karka	KTM	12	+1 Lap
22	47	(Brazil) Bueno	Yamaha	12	+1 Lap
23	122	(Poland) Wieckowski	KTM	12	+1 Lap
24	68	(South Africa) Raynard	Yamaha	12	+1 Lap
25	77	(Ukraine) Kruk	Yamaha	12	+1 Lap
26	71	(Iceland) Sigurdsson	KTM	12	+1 Lap
27	101	(Croatia) Hranic	KTM	11	+2 Laps
28	110	(Cyprus) Georgiou	Yamaha	10	+3 Laps
29	62	(Japan) Otsuka	Honda	9	Did Not Finish
30	53	(Puerto Rico) Rodriguez	Kawasaki	9	+4 Laps
31	116	(Greece) Georgantas	Husqvarna	3	Did Not Finish
32	59	(Portugal) Outeiro	KTM	2	Did Not Finish
33	95	(Russia) Petrashin	KTM	1	Did Not Finish
	113	(Luxembourg) Frank	Honda	0	Did Not Start

=== Open ===
Place	Nr	Rider	Motorcycle	Laps	Gap
1	99	(Latvia) Jonass	Husqvarna	13	
2	18	(Belgium) Strijbos	Yamaha	13	+1.147
3	6	(Netherlands) Coldenhoff	KTM	13	+38.431
4	9	(United Kingdom) Simpson	KTM	13	+41.618
5	24	(Estonia) Kullas	Honda	13	+1:02.268
6	12	(Australia) Duffy	KTM	13	+1:14.670
7	3	(France) Tixier	KTM	13	+1:21.168
8	15	(United States) Osborne	Husqvarna	13	+1:24.175
9	108	(Denmark) Bøgh Damm	KTM	13	+1:47.042
10	27	(Germany) Ullrich	Husqvarna	13	+1:58.875
11	90	(Italy) Lupino	Kawasaki	12	+1 Lap
12	123	(Poland) Staszkiewicz	KTM	12	+1 Lap
13	21	(Spain) Campano	Yamaha	12	+1 Lap
14	69	(South Africa) Vercueil	Yamaha	12	+1 Lap
15	33	(Sweden) Gole	Yamaha	12	+1 Lap
16	60	(Portugal) Basaula	KTM	12	+1 Lap
17	45	(Czech Republic) Neugebauer	KTM	12	+1 Lap
18	72	(Iceland) Reynisson	Yamaha	12	+1 Lap
19	105	(Lithuania) Jazdauskas	Husqvarna	12	+1 Lap
20	120	(Norway) Wahl	KTM	12	+1 Lap
21	36	(Austria) Sandner	KTM	12	+1 Lap
22	78	(Ukraine) Tarasov	KTM	12	+1 Lap
23	93	(Slovenia) Irt	Yamaha	12	+1 Lap
24	96	(Russia) Pronenko	Husqvarna	12	+1 Lap
25	63	(Japan) Tomita	Honda	12	+1 Lap
26	54	(Puerto Rico) Marquier	Kawasaki	12	+1 Lap
27	51	(New Zealand) Purvis	Yamaha	12	+1 Lap
28	39	(Republic of Ireland) Edmonds	Husqvarna	12	+1 Lap
29	102	(Croatia) Kelava	KTM	12	+1 Lap
30	57	(Switzerland) Scheiwiller	Yamaha	11	+2 Laps
31	111	(Cyprus) Georgiou	Yamaha	10	+3 Laps
32	117	(Greece) Andreou	Yamaha	10	+3 Laps
33	48	(Brazil) Alves	KTM	0	Did Not Finish
	114	(Luxembourg) de Figueiredo	Honda	0	Did Not Start

=== Qualification Standings ===
- Qualified Nations

Place	Nation	Points
1	Belgium	5
2	Netherlands	5
3	United States	7
4	Australia	9
5	Italy	14
6	Latvia	14
7	France	15
8	(United Kingdom) Great Britain	15
9	Denmark	15
10	Switzerland	15
11	Sweden	16
12	Spain	17
13	Estonia	17
14	Germany	22
15	Norway	22
16	Slovenia	22
17	New Zealand	26
18	Austria	32
19	South Africa	32

- Nations Admitted to the B-Final

Place	Nation	Points
20	Czech Republic	34
21	Poland	35
22	Lithuania	40
23	Iceland	43
24	Puerto Rico	43
25	(Republic of Ireland) Ireland	43
26	Portugal	43
27	Brazil	43
28	Russia	46
29	Ukraine	47
30	Japan	54
31	Croatia	56
32	Greece	57

- None Qualified Nations

Place	Nation	Points
33	Cyprus	58
34	Luxembourg	29

== B-Final ==
The B-Final is for the nations who finished 20th-32nd in qualifying. The top nation from the B-Final qualify for the Motocross des Nations races. Best 2 scores for each nation counts.

=== Race ===
Place	Nr	Rider	Motorcycle	Laps	Gap
1	60	(Portugal) Basaula	KTM	10	
2	39	(Republic of Ireland) Edmonds	Husqvarna	10	+45.091
3	121	(Poland) Wysocki	KTM	10	+53.466
4	43	(Czech Republic) Kovar	KTM	10	+59.857
5	78	(Ukraine) Tarasov	KTM	10	+1:13.641
6	95	(Russia) Petrashin	KTM	10	+1:20.666
7	123	(Poland) Staszkiewicz	KTM	10	+1:21.812
8	38	(Republic of Ireland) Barr	Yamaha	10	+1:35.976
9	46	(Brazil) Santos	Yamaha	10	+2:08.073
10	104	(Lithuania) Karka	KTM	10	+2:52.509
11	63	(Japan) Tomita	Honda	9	+1 Lap
12	72	(Iceland) Reynisson	Yamaha	9	+1 Lap
13	37	(Republic of Ireland) Meara	Kawasaki	9	+1 Lap
14	47	(Brazil) Bueno	Yamaha	9	+1 Lap
15	58	(Portugal) Peixe	Suzuki	9	+1 Lap
16	102	(Croatia) Kelava	KTM	9	+1 Lap
17	122	(Poland) Wieckowski	KTM	9	+1 Lap
18	76	(Ukraine) Morozov	Yamaha	9	+1 Lap
19	94	(Russia) Brylyakov	Yamaha	9	+1 Lap
20	96	(Russia) Pronenko	Husqvarna	9	+1 Lap
21	44	(Czech Republic) Polak	KTM	9	+1 Lap
22	71	(Iceland) Sigurdsson	KTM	9	+1 Lap
23	115	(Greece) Kritikos	Yamaha	9	+1 Lap
24	62	(Japan) Otsuka	Honda	9	+1 Lap
25	105	(Lithuania) Jazdauskas	Husqvarna	8	+2 Laps
26	59	(Portugal) Outeiro	KTM	8	+2 Laps
27	116	(Greece) Georgantas	Husqvarna	8	+2 Laps
28	101	(Croatia) Hranic	KTM	7	+3 Laps
29	53	(Puerto Rico) Rodriguez	Kawasaki	6	+4 Laps
30	45	(Czech Republic) Neugebauer	KTM	6	+4 Laps
31	100	(Croatia) Crnkovic	Honda	4	Did Not Finish
32	77	(Ukraine) Kruk	Yamaha	2	Did Not Finish
33	117	(Greece) Andreou	Yamaha	2	Did Not Finish
34	52	(Puerto Rico) Starling	Suzuki	1	Did Not Finish
35	54	(Puerto Rico) Marquier	Kawasaki	0	Did Not Finish
36	70	(Iceland) Birgisson	KTM	0	Did Not Finish
	103	(Lithuania) Jasikonis	Husqvarna	0	Did Not Start
	61	(Japan) Narita	Honda	0	Did Not Start
	48	(Brazil) Alves	KTM	0	Did Not Start
Place	Nr	Rider	Motorcycle	Laps	Gap

=== B-Final Standings ===
- Ireland qualify for the Motocross des Nations races.

Place	Nation	Points
1	(Republic of Ireland) Ireland	10
2	Poland	10
3	Portugal	16
4	Ukraine	23
5	Brazil	23
6	Russia	25
7	Czech Republic	25
8	Iceland	34
9	Lithuania	35
10	Japan	35
11	Croatia	44
12	Greece	50
13	Puerto Rico	63
Place	Nation	Points

== Motocross des Nations races ==
The main Motocross des Nations races consist of 3 races which combine two classes together in each. Lowest score wins with each nation allowed to drop their worst score after the final race.

=== MXGP+MX2 ===
Place	Nr	Rider	Motorcycle	Laps	Gap
1	91	(Slovenia) Gajser	Honda	17	
2	4	(Netherlands) Herlings	KTM	17	+0.897
3	19	(Spain) Prado	KTM	17	+18.909
4	55	(Switzerland) Seewer	Yamaha	17	+20.095
5	1	(France) Paulin	Yamaha	17	+30.079
6	16	(Belgium) Van Horebeek	Honda	17	+35.526
7	88	(Italy) Monticelli	KTM	17	+38.577
8	107	(Denmark) Kjær Olsen	Husqvarna	17	+1:14.026
9	118	(Norway) Fredriksen	Yamaha	17	+1:50.041
10	5	(Netherlands) Vlaanderen	Honda	17	+1:56.915
11	25	(Germany) Koch	Honda	17	+1:59.656
12	35	(Austria) Hofer	KTM	17	+2:04.963
13	22	(Estonia) Leok	Husqvarna	17	+2:19.058
14	32	(Sweden) Östlund	Husqvarna	16	+1 Lap
15	10	(Australia) Ferris	KTM	16	+1 Lap
16	31	(Sweden) Bengtsson	Husqvarna	16	+1 Lap
17	13	(United States) Anderson	Husqvarna	16	+1 Lap
18	2	(France) Renaux	Yamaha	16	+1 Lap
19	56	(Switzerland) Guillod	Honda	16	+1 Lap
20	119	(Norway) Horgmo	KTM	16	+1 Lap
21	23	(Estonia) Rätsep	Honda	16	+1 Lap
22	20	(Spain) Larrañaga	KTM	16	+1 Lap
23	11	(Australia) Webster	Honda	16	+1 Lap
24	8	(United Kingdom) Sterry	Kawasaki	16	+1 Lap
25	14	(United States) Cooper	Yamaha	16	+1 Lap
26	98	(Latvia) Ivanovs	Husqvarna	15	+2 Laps
27	34	(Austria) Neurauter	KTM	15	+2 Laps
28	97	(Latvia) Macuks	KTM	15	+2 Laps
29	37	(Republic of Ireland) Meara	Kawasaki	15	+2 Laps
30	17	(Belgium) Geerts	Yamaha	14	Did Not Finish
31	92	(Slovenia) Pancar	Yamaha	14	+3 Laps
32	106	(Denmark) S. Kjær Olsen	KTM	14	Did Not Finish
33	89	(Italy) Forato	Husqvarna	11	Did Not Finish
34	49	(New Zealand) Chase	Honda	11	+6 Laps
35	67	(South Africa) Docherty	KTM	9	Did Not Finish
36	7	(United Kingdom) Watson	KTM	8	Did Not Finish
37	26	(Germany) Längenfelder	KTM	8	Did Not Finish
38	68	(South Africa) Raynard	Yamaha	7	Did Not Finish
39	50	(New Zealand) Walsh	Husqvarna	7	Did Not Finish
	38	(Republic of Ireland) Barr	Yamaha	0	Did Not Start
Place	Nr	Rider	Motorcycle	Laps	Gap

=== Nations standings after Race 1 ===
Place	Nation	Points
1	Netherlands	12
2	Switzerland	23
3	France	23
4	Spain	25
5	Norway	29
6	Sweden	30
7	Slovenia	32
8	Estonia	34
9	Belgium	36
10	Australia	38
11	Austria	39
12	Italy	40
13	Denmark	40
14	United States	42
15	Germany	48
16	Latvia	54
17	(United Kingdom) Great Britain	60
18	New Zealand	73
19	South Africa	73
20	(Republic of Ireland) Ireland	29
Place	Nation	Points

=== MX2+Open ===
Place	Nr	Rider	Motorcycle	Laps	Gap
1	6	(Netherlands) Coldenhoff	KTM	16	
2	99	(Latvia) Jonass	Husqvarna	16	+5.180
3	9	(United Kingdom) Simpson	KTM	16	+41.404
4	24	(Estonia) Kullas	Honda	16	+1:08.922
5	15	(United States) Osborne	Husqvarna	16	+1:26.808
6	3	(France) Tixier	KTM	16	+1:29.976
7	17	(Belgium) Geerts	Yamaha	16	+1:30.723
8	107	(Denmark) Kjær Olsen	Husqvarna	16	+1:34.713
9	27	(Germany) Ullrich	Husqvarna	16	+1:45.868
10	5	(Netherlands) Vlaanderen	Honda	16	+1:52.114
11	12	(Australia) Duffy	KTM	16	+2:04.656
12	8	(United Kingdom) Sterry	Kawasaki	16	+2:05.804
13	21	(Spain) Campano	Yamaha	16	+2:18.151
14	11	(Australia) Webster	Honda	16	+2:26.017
15	119	(Norway) Horgmo	KTM	15	+1 Lap
16	32	(Sweden) Östlund	Husqvarna	15	+1 Lap
17	18	(Belgium) Strijbos	Yamaha	15	+1 Lap
18	108	(Denmark) Bøgh Damm	KTM	15	+1 Lap
19	26	(Germany) Längenfelder	KTM	15	+1 Lap
20	89	(Italy) Forato	Husqvarna	15	+1 Lap
21	90	(Italy) Lupino	Kawasaki	15	+1 Lap
22	98	(Latvia) Ivanovs	Husqvarna	15	+1 Lap
23	33	(Sweden) Gole	Yamaha	15	+1 Lap
24	56	(Switzerland) Guillod	Honda	15	+1 Lap
25	23	(Estonia) Rätsep	Honda	15	+1 Lap
26	35	(Austria) Hofer	KTM	15	+1 Lap
27	38	(Republic of Ireland) Barr	Yamaha	15	+1 Lap
28	20	(Spain) Larrañaga	KTM	15	+1 Lap
29	14	(United States) Cooper	Yamaha	15	+1 Lap
30	2	(France) Renaux	Yamaha	14	+2 Laps
31	120	(Norway) Wahl	KTM	14	+2 Laps
32	36	(Austria) Sandner	KTM	14	+2 Laps
33	51	(New Zealand) Purvis	Yamaha	14	+2 Laps
34	93	(Slovenia) Irt	Yamaha	14	+2 Laps
35	39	(Republic of Ireland) Edmonds	Husqvarna	13	+3 Laps
36	57	(Switzerland) Scheiwiller	Yamaha	13	+3 Laps
37	92	(Slovenia) Pancar	Yamaha	13	+3 Laps
38	68	(South Africa) Raynard	Yamaha	13	+3 Laps
39	50	(New Zealand) Walsh	Husqvarna	3	Did Not Finish
40	69	(South Africa) Vercueil	Yamaha	2	Did Not Finish
Place	Nr	Rider	Motorcycle	Laps	Gap

=== Nations standings after Race 2 ===
Place	Nation	Points
1	Netherlands	23
2	France	59
3	Belgium	60
4	Estonia	63
5	Australia	63
6	Spain	66
7	Denmark	66
8	Sweden	69
9	(United Kingdom) Great Britain	75
10	Norway	75
11	United States	76
12	Germany	76
13	Latvia	78
14	Italy	81
15	Switzerland	83
16	Austria	97
17	Slovenia	103
18	New Zealand	145
19	South Africa	151
20	(Republic of Ireland) Ireland	91
Place	Nation	Points

=== MXGP+Open ===
Place	Nr	Rider	Motorcycle	Laps	Gap
1	6	(Netherlands) Coldenhoff	KTM	16	
2	91	(Slovenia) Gajser	Honda	16	+2.489
3	99	(Latvia) Jonass	Husqvarna	16	+41.867
4	4	(Netherlands) Herlings	KTM	16	+51.947
5	55	(Switzerland) Seewer	Yamaha	16	+55.224
6	16	(Belgium) Van Horebeek	Honda	16	+1:02.603
7	19	(Spain) Prado	KTM	16	+1:15.893
8	13	(United States) Anderson	Husqvarna	16	+1:22.934
9	7	(United Kingdom) Watson	KTM	16	+1:24.650
10	9	(United Kingdom) Simpson	KTM	16	+2:12.110
11	18	(Belgium) Strijbos	Yamaha	15	+1 Lap
12	24	(Estonia) Kullas	Honda	15	+1 Lap
13	15	(United States) Osborne	Husqvarna	15	+1 Lap
14	22	(Estonia) Leok	Husqvarna	15	+1 Lap
15	25	(Germany) Koch	KTM	15	+1 Lap
16	3	(France) Tixier	KTM	15	+1 Lap
17	118	(Norway) Fredriksen	Yamaha	15	+1 Lap
18	27	(Germany) Ullrich	Husqvarna	15	+1 Lap
19	106	(Denmark) Kjær Olsen	KTM	15	+1 Lap
20	97	(Latvia) Macuks	KTM	15	+1 Lap
21	93	(Slovenia) Irt	Yamaha	15	+1 Lap
22	33	(Sweden) Gole	Yamaha	15	+1 Lap
23	1	(France) Paulin	Yamaha	14	Did Not Finish
24	108	(Denmark) Bøgh Damm	KTM	14	+2 Laps
25	36	(Austria) Sandner	KTM	14	+2 Laps
26	120	(Norway) Wahl	KTM	14	+2 Laps
27	51	(New Zealand) Purvis	Yamaha	14	+2 Laps
28	39	(Republic of Ireland) Edmonds	Husqvarna	14	+2 Laps
29	57	(Switzerland) Scheiwiller	Yamaha	14	+2 Laps
30	10	(Australia) Ferris	KTM	13	Did Not Finish
31	37	(Republic of Ireland) Meara	Kawasaki	13	+3 Laps
32	88	(Italy) Monticelli	KTM	11	Did Not Finish
33	12	(Australia) Duffy	KTM	11	Did Not Finish
34	31	(Sweden) Bengtsson	Husqvarna	11	Did Not Finish
35	21	(Spain) Campano	Yamaha	10	Did Not Finish
36	34	(Austria) Neurauter	KTM	10	Did Not Finish
37	90	(Italy) Lupino	Kawasaki	8	Did Not Finish
38	49	(New Zealand) Chase	Honda	3	Did Not Finish
	67	(South Africa) Docherty	KTM	0	Did Not Start
	69	(South Africa) Vercueil	Yamaha	0	Did Not Start
Place	Nr	Rider	Motorcycle	Laps	Gap

=== Nations standings after Race 3 ===
Place	Nation	Points
1	Netherlands	18
2	Belgium	47
3	(United Kingdom) Great Britain	58
4	Estonia	64
5	France	68
6	United States	68
7	Germany	72
8	Latvia	73
9	Spain	73
10	Denmark	77
11	Switzerland	81
12	Norway	87
13	Slovenia	89
14	Sweden	91
15	Australia	93
16	Italy	113
17	Austria	122
18	(Republic of Ireland) Ireland	150
19	New Zealand	171
20	South Africa	151
Place	Nation	Points

== Final standings ==
Place	Nation	Points	Total	Change
1	Netherlands	1 + 1 + 2 + 4 + 10	18	+ 1
2	Belgium	6 + 6 + 7 + 11 + 17	47	+ 4
3	United Kingdom	3 + 9 + 10 + 12 + 24	58	=
4	Estonia	4 + 12 + 13 + 14 + 21	64	+ 4
5	France	5 + 6 + 16 + 18 + 23	68	4
6	United States	5 + 8 + 13 + 17 + 25	68	1
7	Germany	9 + 11 + 15 + 18 + 19	72	+ 2
8	Latvia	2 + 3 + 20 + 22 + 26	73	*
9	Spain	3 + 7 + 13 + 22 + 28	73	2
10	Denmark	8 + 8 + 18 + 19 + 24	77	*
11	Switzerland	4 + 5 + 19 + 24 + 29	81	+ 8
12	Norway	9 + 15 + 17 + 20 + 26	87	*
13	Slovenia	1 + 2 + 21 + 31 + 34	89	*
14	Sweden	14 + 16 + 16 + 22 + 23	91	3
15	Australia	11 + 14 + 15 + 23 + 30	93	11
16	Italy	7 + 20 + 21 + 32 + 33	113	+ 14
17	Austria	12 + 25 + 26 + 27 + 32	122	5
18	Ireland	27 + 28 + 29 + 31 + 35	150	5
19	New Zealand	27 + 33 + 34 + 38 + 39	171	2
20	South Africa	35 + 38 + 38 + 40	151	+ 3
21	Poland			*
22	Portugal			2
23	Ukraine			+ 3
24	Brazil			8
25	Russia			*
26	Czech Republic			11
27	Iceland			3
28	Lithuania			*
29	Japan			8
30	Croatia			*
31	Greece			*
32	Puerto Rico			14
33	Cyprus			*
34	Luxembourg			*
