= Thomas Kjær Olsen =

Danish motorcycle racer (born 1997)

Thomas Kjer Olsen
- Nationality: (Denmark) Danish
- Born: 24 April 1997 (age 29) Sønderborg, Denmark

Motocross career
- Years active: 2014-present
- Teams: Rockstar Energy Husqvarna Factory Racing (2017-2021)
- Championships: •2016 EMX 250cc
- Wins: •MX2: 5

Thomas Kjer Olsen (born 24 April 1997) is a Danish professional motocross rider. He has competed in the Motocross World Championships since 2014 and is notable for winning the 2016 European Motocross Championship in EMX250.

In 2021, Kjer Olsen won the opening race of Motocross des Nations in Mantua.

== Achievements ==
At 12 August 2021 Olsen won 5 GP's in the Motocross World Championship.

Year	Motorcycle	World Championship				
Year	Motorcycle	MXGP	MX2	Titles	GP wins	Races wins
2017	Husqvarna		3		1	2
2018	Husqvarna		3		1	1
2019	Husqvarna		2		1	3
2020	Husqvarna		6		2	2
2021	Husqvarna	9			0	0
Total				0	5	8
