= Harri Kullas =

Estonian motocross racer

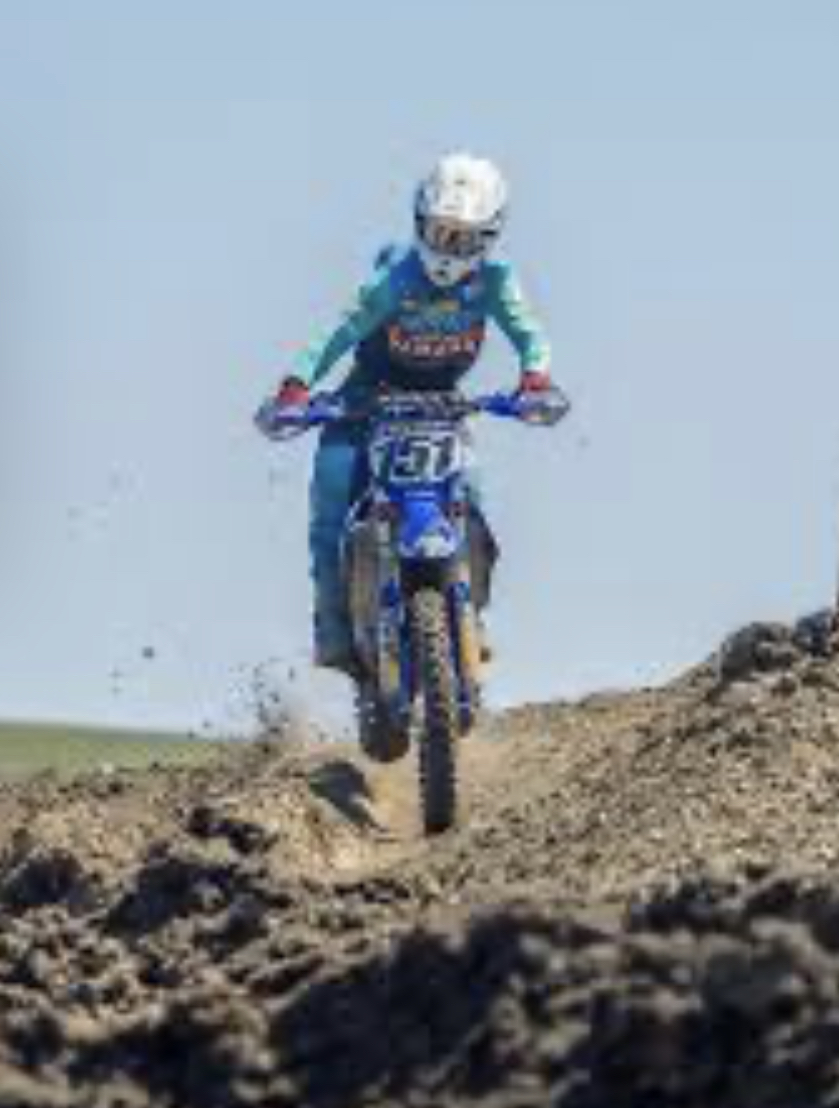
- Harri Kullas during a race
- Nationality: Estonian
- Born: 1 March 1992 (age 34); Helsinki, Finland
- Current team: Schmicker Silve Racing (Germany)/KTM Canada (Canada)
- Bike number: 151

Harri Kullas (born 1 March 1992) is a Finnish-born Estonian professional motocross racer. Kullas has had a long international career that has seen him compete in the FIM Motocross World Championship in both the MX2 and MXGP classes. Following this, Kullas has taken his career to the United States, most notably competing in the AMA Motocross Championship.

Kullas has competed at the Motocross des Nations 15 times, on the first four occasions for Finland and since 2014 for Estonia. As part of this, Kullas has been part of the Estonia teams that have recorded the highest overall finish ever for the nation – a pair of fourth places in 2015 and 2019.

Alongside this, Kullas has competed extensively in various national championships across Europe. In the UK-based MX Nationals series Kullas has taken the MX1 title three times as well as winning the overall Pro Fastest 40 ranking in 2022. In addition to this, Kullas has finished as runner-up to Tommy Searle in the MX1 class of the British Motocross Championship in 2021 & 2022. Kullas has also had second place finishes in the final overall standings in the ADAC MX Masters series, the Spanish Motocross Championship and the Canadian Triple Crown Series during his career.

In supercross, Kullas has won nine nights at the annual Tampere Supercross in Finland since 2012.

== Early life ==
Kullas was born to Estonian parents in Helsinki, Finland, and he holds Estonian and Finnish citizenships.

== Career ==
=== Junior career ===
In the first part of his career, Kullas competed under the Finnish flag. He notably finished fourth in the 85cc class of the 2006 FIM Motocross Junior World Championship. The following season he stepped up to the 125cc class, culminating in him finishing in ninth overall in the 2007 FIM Motocross Junior World Championship.

=== 250 career ===
Kullas stepped up again in 2008, this time up to the 250cc category aboard a KTM, competing at European level in the EMX2 class. He did not compete at every round of the series, but he did manage to record a third place finish in race one at the Finnish round. This culminated in a final championship position of 16th and alongside this he made his debut in the FIM Motocross World Championship by racing in the MX2 class at the final two rounds of the year. At the first of these in Lierop, he recorded his first world championship points on debut. His performances were good enough for him to be selected for the Finnish team for that years Motocross des Nations at Donington Park. The team was able to finish in 11th overall and Kullas picked up the Ricky Carmichael award for the best individual young rider at the event.

For 2009, Kullas stayed in the EMX2 European Championship, missing four rounds but still finishing in sixth overall in the final standings. On the way to this, he would take his first race win in the series, which also resulted in his first overall round win at Schwedt in Germany. On the back of this, Kullas was signed to race in the MX2 class of the FIM Motocross World Championship full-time for 2010 by the Yamaha Gariboldi Monster Energy team. He was able to finish in 11th in the final standings with several top-six race finishes. After a second season with the team in 2011, where he was able to finish ninth in the final standings after missing the final two rounds, he switched to the Suzuki Europe squad for 2012. Unfortunately a knee injury obtained at the Swedish Grand Prix curtailed his season, resulting in an 18th in the final championship standings. Following this, Kullas returned to the Gariboldi team for 2013, who by this time was using Honda machinery. He had a good start to the season by finishing runner-up in the MX2 class of the annual pre-season Italian International Championship. However, at world championship level, Kullas' collaboration with the Gariboldi team ended after the Italian Grand Prix. Kullas finished the season with the Sahkar KTM team, achieving a final championship position of 15th.

During 2014, Kullas would begin to compete under the Estonian flag, making his Motocross des Nations debut for them that year. He remained with Sahkar KTM for that season, finishing in 18th in the MX2 World Championship standings after only competing in the European rounds of the series. 2015 would be Kullas' last year in the MX2 class, he started the season competing for the British-based Heads and all Threads Suzuki team – mainly concentrating on the British Motocross Championship. However, he would be called up to the factory Wilvo Nestaan Husqvarna team to replace the injured Aleksandr Tonkov mid-season. Kullas had an immediate impact, placing third in the second race at the Latvian Grand Prix – a result good enough to give him his first overall world championship podium. He finished the season by being part of the Estonia team that finished in fourth place at the 2015 Motocross des Nations, the highest finish ever for the country.

=== 450 career ===
Kullas needed to move up to the MXGP category for 2016. He was able to sign a deal to ride for the German Sarholz KTM team, a deal that would see him compete at the European rounds of MXGP as well as the ADAC MX Masters series in Germany. He managed to finish in second in the final standings of the ADAC MX Masters championship, 12 points behind his teammate Dennis Ullrich. His part campaign in MXGP produced a best race finish of tenth in the first race at Valkenswaard, with 23rd in the final championship standings. The following season was again a part campaign in MXGP, with another tenth place (this time coming at race two in Assen) being the highlight.

2018 saw the focus for Kullas switch to mainly being on domestic championships in Europe. He rode the Spanish Motocross Championship in the Elite-MX1 class for the CSM Zambrana team, finishing as runner-up. He rode five MXGP rounds alongside this, with a best position of 15th. In 2019, this reduced to three MXGP appearances as he returned to the UK competition with the Cab Screens Honda team. The 2019 Motocross des Nations saw Kullas play a part in Estonia recording another fourth position overall, equalling the previous best result in 2015. Kullas has stayed with the Cab Screens squad in the UK since 2019, in the meantime picking up three MX1 titles in the MX Nationals championship as well as finishing runner-up in the 2021 and 2022 British Motocross Championship in the MX1 class.

In 2022, Kullas competed as a replacement rider for the Gebben Van Venrooy team in MXGP for four rounds, holeshotting a race in Lommel. 2023 would be Kullas' last season with the Cabscreens Crescent Yamaha team, as the team closed its doors at the end of the season. He was third in the MX1 class of the 2023 British Motocross Championship taking one round win, as well as finishing third in the MX Nationals series. He competed in two MXGP rounds for the team, showing impressive speed on both occasions, including finishing eighth in the second race in Lommel. In addition to this, Kullas made his AMA Motocross Championship debut during 2023, riding the last three rounds of the season. Despite only racing three rounds, Kullas finished 20th in the final standings and was able to record sixth overall at the Unadilla round. The season was finished by Kullas competing in his 13th Motocross des Nations in Ernée.

Kullas began 2024 by riding in the British Arenacross series for the FUS Marsh Husqvarna team. Despite missing the last round due to a dislocated shoulder, Kullas was able to finish second in the final AX Pro class standings. After recovering from his injury, Kullas rode two international races in France as well as at the opening round of the 2024 ADAC MX Masters for the MX-Handel Racing team. Following this, he took his career to Brazil by signing for the KTM Pro Tork Racing Team for the Brazilian Motocross and Arenacross championships. Alongside these commitments, Kullas raced the 2024 AMA National Motocross Championship with backing from his personal sponsors. Despite having to miss two rounds due to clashes with racing in Brazil, Kullas finished 12th in the final standings of the 450 class with five top-ten race finishes throughout the season. These performances were enough to qualify him directly for the finals of the 2024 SuperMotocross World Championship, where he took a ninth place at the final round. Following this, Kullas competed in his 14th Motocross des Nations at the 2024 edition.

Kullas' appearances in America saw him get picked up by the MRPSBR Husqvarna Racing team for the 2025 SuperMotocross World Championship. Making his full-time supercross debut in the 250SX East class of the 2025 AMA Supercross Championship, a broken sternum ended his championship campaign after two rounds. Returning for the 2025 AMA National Motocross Championship, Kullas repeated his feat of finishing twelfth in the final standings of the 450 class. This saw again qualify for the SuperMotocross World Championship playoffs, where he finished twentieth overall after the three rounds. These results saw Kullas selected for Estonia at the 2025 Motocross des Nations, his fifteenth individual appearance at the event. After failing to qualify directly, the team had to go through the B-Final, where Kullas finished in second place. With his team mate finishing fourth, they managed to qualify through the B-Final and would end the event in 13th overall. For 2026, Kullas signed a deal with KTM to focus on the Canadian championship, known as the Triple Crown Series. He adapted quickly to the new series and new tracks, competing closely with eventual champion Dylan Wright, taking three overall wins. As well as finishing second in the final standings, Kullas competed in two rounds of the 2026 ADAC MX Masters but ultimately missed out on racing at another Motocross des Nations due to a late year injury.

== Honours ==
Motocross des Nations

- Team Overall: 2015 & 2019 (Estonia) 4th
- Ricky Carmichael Motocross of Nations Youngest Rider Award: 2008 (gold)

ADAC MX Masters (Germany)

- Masters: 2016 (silver)

British Motocross Championship

- MX1: 2021 & 2022 (silver) , 2023 (bronze)

Spanish Motocross Championship

- Elite-MX1: 2018 (silver)

Italian International Motocross Championship

- MX2: 2013 (silver)

Triple Crown Series

- 450: 2026 (silver)

MX Nationals (UK)

- Pro Fastest 40: 2022 (gold) , 2023 (bronze)
- MX1: 2019, 2021 & 2022 (gold) , 2023 (bronze)

Finnish Motocross Championship

- MX1: 2021 (silver) , 2009 (bronze)
- MX2: 2008 (bronze)
- 85cc: 2006 (gold)

Estonian Motocross Championship

- MX1: 2016 (silver) 2014, 2017 & 2018 (bronze)
- MX2: 2014 & 2017 (silver)

UK Arenacross

- AX Pro: 2024 (silver)

Tampere Supercross

- 9 night wins

== Career statistics ==
=== Motocross des Nations ===
Year	Location	Nation	Class	Teammates	Team Overall	Individual Overall
2008	(United Kingdom) Donington Park	FIN	MX2	Antti Pyrhönen; Matti Seistola	11th	9th
2009	(Italy) Franciacorta	FIN	Open	Antti Pyrhönen; Eero Remes	18th	7th
2010	(United States) Lakewood	FIN	MX2	Toni Eriksson; Ludvig Söderberg	14th	7th
2013	(Germany) Teutschenthal	FIN	MX2	Santtu Tiainen; Ludvig Söderberg	18th	13th
2014	(Latvia) Ķegums	EST	MX2	Gert Krestinov; Tanel Leok	9th	11th
2015	(France) Ernée	EST	MX2	Priit Rätsep; Tanel Leok	4th	5th
2016	(Italy) Maggiora	EST	Open	Priit Rätsep; Tanel Leok	9th	8th
2017	(United Kingdom) Matterley Basin	EST	MX2	Priit Rätsep; Tanel Leok	8th	10th
2018	(United States) Red Bud	EST	Open	Tanel Leok; Hardi Roosiorg	8th	5th
2019	(Netherlands) Assen	EST	Open	Tanel Leok; Priit Rätsep	4th	4th
2021	(Italy) Mantua	EST	Open	Gert Krestinov; Jörgen-Matthias Talviku	7th	8th
2022	(United States) Red Bud	EST	Open	Tanel Leok; Jörgen-Matthias Talviku	19th	8th
2023	(France) Ernée	EST	Open	Tanel Leok; Jörgen-Matthias Talviku	11th	6th
2024	(United Kingdom) Matterley Basin	EST	Open	Gert Krestinov; Tanel Leok	19th	13th
2025	(United States) Ironman	EST	Open	Jörgen-Matthias Talviku; Joosep Pärn	13th	8th

=== FIM Motocross World Championship ===
==== By season ====
Season	Class	Number	Motorcycle	Team	Race	Race Wins	Overall Wins	Race Top-3	Overall Podium	Pts	Plcd
2008	MX2	151	KTM	VMK Racing KTM	2	0	0	0	0	3	57th
2010	MX2	151	Yamaha	Yamaha Gariboldi Monster Energy	30	0	0	0	0	329	11th
2011	MX2	151	Yamaha	Monster Energy Yamaha	26	0	0	0	0	287	9th
2012	MX2	151	Suzuki	Suzuki Europe MX2	17	0	0	0	0	132	18th
2013	MX2	151	Honda	Gariboldi Honda	16	0	0	0	0	224	15th
2013	MX2	151	KTM	Sahkar Racing	16	0	0	0	0	224	15th
2014	MX2	151	KTM	Sahkar Racing	20	0	0	0	0	127	18th
2015	MX2	151	Suzuki	Heads and all Threads Suzuki	3	0	0	0	0	181	17th
2015	MX2	151	Husqvarna	Wilvo Nestaan Husqvarna Factory Racing	13	0	0	1	1	181	17th
2016	MXGP	151	KTM	Sarholz Racing	20	0	0	0	0	59	23rd
2017	MXGP	151	Husqvarna	Sõmerpalu MK	12	0	0	0	0	59	24th
2018	MXGP	151	Husqvarna	Pol Motors Husqvarna	8	0	0	0	0	18	29th
2018	MXGP	151	Husqvarna	CSM Zambrana Husqvarna	2	0	0	0	0	18	29th
2019	MXGP	151	Honda	Cab Screen Honda Racing	6	0	0	0	0	19	34th
2020	MXGP	151	Honda	Cab Screens/Deos Group Racing	2	0	0	0	0	11	39th
2021	MXGP	151	Yamaha	Cab Screens Crescent Yamaha Racing	2	0	0	0	0	0	NC
2022	MXGP	151	Yamaha	Gebben Van Venrooy Yamaha Racing	8	0	0	0	0	21	28th
2023	MXGP	151	Yamaha	Cabscreens Crescent Yamaha	4	0	0	0	0	37	28th
Total					207	0	0	1	1	1507	

=== AMA National Motocross Championship ===
==== By season ====
Season	Class	Number	Motorcycle	Team	Races	Race Wins	Overall Wins	Race Top-3	Overall Podium	Pts	Plcd
2023	450	953	Yamaha	BBL Racing	6	0	0	0	0	67	20th
2024	450	79	KTM	JT Construction/Ilves Transport	18	0	0	0	0	163	12th
2025	450	42	Husqvarna	MRPSBR Husqvarna Racing	21	0	0	0	0	158	12th
Total					45	0	0	0	0	388	

=== AMA Supercross Championship ===
==== By season ====
Season	Class	Number	Motorcycle	Team	Overall Wins	Overall Podium	Pts	Plcd
2025	250SX East	42	Husqvarna	MRPSBR Husqvarna Racing	0	0	0	N/A
Total					0	0	0	
