= Dylan Wright =

Canadian motocross racer

- Nationality: Canadian
- Born: 23 September 1997 (age 29); Ontario
- Current team: Honda Canada GDR Fox Racing
- Bike number: 9

Dylan Wright (born 23 September 1997) is a Canadian professional Motocross racer. Wright is one of the most successful Canadian riders of recent years, winning six individual national motocross titles.

In addition to competing in his native Canada, Wright competed in the final five rounds of the 2021 FIM Motocross World Championship, securing a ninth overall as his best result.

Wright has represented Canada at the Motocross of Nations on five occasions, with the most recent being at the 2026 edition.

== Career ==
=== 250 career ===
After a successful amateur career in his native Canada, Wright turned professional in the 2014 season for the MX101 FXR Yamaha team. Despite it being his first year in the professional ranks, Wright finished ninth in the final standings of the MX2 class within the Canadian Motocross Nationals. The 2015 season would see Wright improve his final ranking in the series to sixth, despite him missing a round of the championship due to a practice crash. His results continued to improve in 2016, where he finished third in the MX2 class final standings and took his first overall win at the Ulverton round. At the end of the season, Wright competed as a professional in the United States for the first time, riding at the final round of the 2016 AMA National Motocross Championship and scoring five points.

Wright moved to the Honda Canada GDR Fox Racing team for the 2017 season, on an initial two-year deal. This switch again saw him improve his position in the MX2 class, as he finished runner-up to Shawn Maffenbeier in the final standings. Following this, he returned to America, this time to compete in the final two rounds in the 250 class of the 2017 AMA National Motocross Championship. Across the two appearances he scored twenty points, notably finishing thirteenth overall at Budd's Creek. The 2018 season would be the first season of the new Triple Crown Series format in Canada, comprising Arenacross, Motocross and Supercross into one series with standings for each discipline counting as the national championship. Wright suffered a shoulder injury at the third round of the season-opening Arenacross series but bounced back to finish fourth in the final standings of the MX Tour later in the season.

Wright started the 2019 season by winning the AX Tour in the 250 class, taking two event wins along the way. Following this success, Wright took four round wins in the eight round MX Tour, taking his first Canadian national motocross championship title in the 250 Pro class. He again returned to the America for the final round of the 2019 AMA National Motocross Championship, qualifying in thirteenth for the 250 class but only starting in one race. Back in Canada, Wright would win two of the three rounds at the season ending SX Tour, but missed out on the individual Supercross title by two points. However, his results throughout the year would see him take the overall Triple Crown Series title in the 250 Pro class.

=== 450 career ===
Wright stepped up to compete in the 450 Pro class for the first time in the COVID-19 pandemic-impacted 2020 season. The first racing took place in Canada at the end of July and Wright was able to win all three races on his debut in the class. In the following SX Tour, Wright took one event win, which combined with his MX Tour title was enough to see him crowned overall 450 Pro Triple Crown Series champion. These performances saw him selected to represent his country for the first time at the 2021 Motocross des Nations. Riding in Europe against Motocross World Championship competition for the first time, Wright proved himself quickly by being third fastest in his group's practice session. In the following MXGP qualifying race, he was able to run up front and eventually finish in sixth. After his best result in the main races being eleventh, the team finished fourteenth in the final standings. Due to the COVID-19 pandemic, several rounds of the 2021 FIM Motocross World Championship took place after the Motocross des Nations. With racing finished in Canada, Wright raced in the final five rounds of the MXGP class in the World Championship. Across this stint he only finished outside the top-fifteen on two occasions, with the highlight coming at the third round at the Pietramurata track, where he finished ninth overall.

Despite rumours he could move full-time to compete in the Motocross World Championship, Wright continued to race in Canada for 2022. This would see him dominate the 450 Pro class of the MX Tour, defending his title in commanding fashion by winning all of the nine rounds contested. As the previous year, Wright performed strongly at the 2022 Motocross des Nations, finishing tenth in both his qualifying race and the final main race. His dominance on the domestic scene continued through the 2023 season, where he again defended his MX Tour title in the 450 Pro class by winning every round of the series. Following this, Wright competed in the final two rounds of the 2023 AMA National Motocross Championship. A crash ended his day early at the first of these rounds but at the second he managed to finish eighth overall to record his best result in America. The 2023 Motocross des Nations was tough for both Wright and the Canadian team, where he didn't finish his qualifying race and the B Final which saw the team not qualify.

After recovering from injuries sustained at the 2023 Motocross des Nations, Wright suffered a further setback at the second round of the 2024 Triple Crown Series when he crashed and damaged a lung, several ribs, his heart and shoulder. Despite this, he was able to recover enough to win the final round of the season. Wright made his fourth consecutive appearance for Canada at the 2024 Motocross des Nations, where he was part of the team that finished fifteenth overall. After winning the opening round of the 2025 Triple Crown Series, Wright faced a season marred by incidents and mechanical issues that were combined with him missing the last two rounds. He also chose to compete at the final round of the 2025 AMA National Motocross Championship, but did not line up for the main races due to a fractured T4 vertebra sustained in qualifying.

Wright was able to put the injury woes of the previous two seasons behind him in 2026, as he faced off against Estonian former MXGP racer Harri Kullas for the national title. Whilst Kullas did offer him a challenge and was able to win three rounds, Wright was able to take four of the remaining overall wins to seal his sixth national title. After becoming 2026 Triple Crown Series champion, Wright represented Canada at the 2026 Motocross des Nations, where the team finished fifteenth and he recorded his highest individual overall finish at the event to date, with sixth in the Open class.

== Honours ==
Triple Crown Series

- Overall 450 Pro: 2020, 2022, 2023, & 2026 (gold) , 2021 (bronze)
- Overall 250 Pro: 2019 (gold)
- MX Tour 450: 2020, 2021, 2022, 2023 & 2026 (gold)
- MX Tour 250: 2019 (gold)
- AX Tour 250: 2019 (gold)
- SX Tour 250: 2019 (silver)

Canadian Motocross Nationals

- MX2: 2017 (silver) , 2016 (bronze)

== Career statistics ==
=== Motocross des Nations ===
Year	Location	Nation	Class	Teammates	Team Overall	Individual Overall
2021	(Italy) Mantua	CAN	MXGP	Jacob Piccolo; Tyler Medaglia	14th	12th
2022	(United States) RedBud	CAN	MXGP	Ryder McNabb; Tyler Medaglia	15th	11th
2023	(France) Ernée	CAN	MXGP	Ryder McNabb; Jess Pettis	24th	N/A
2024	(United Kingdom) Matterley Basin	CAN	Open	Jess Pettis; Kaven Benoit	15th	10th
2026	(France) Ernée	CAN	Open	Tanner Ward; Dylan Rempel	14th	6th

=== FIM Motocross World Championship ===
==== By season ====
Season	Class	Number	Motorcycle	Team	Race	Race Wins	Overall Wins	Race Top-3	Overall Podium	Pts	Plcd
2021	MXGP	109	Honda	GDR Honda	10	0	0	0	0	75	24th
Total					10	0	0	0	0	75	

=== AMA National Motocross Championship ===
==== By season ====
Season	Class	Number	Motorcycle	Team	Races	Race Wins	Overall Wins	Race Top-3	Overall Podium	Pts	Plcd
2016	250	223	Yamaha	MX101 FXR Yamaha	2	0	0	0	0	5	38th
2017	250	223	Honda	Honda GDR Fox Racing	4	0	0	0	0	20	28th
2019	250	539	Honda	Honda GDR Fox Racing	1	0	0	0	0	0	N/A
2023	450	539	Honda	Honda GDR Fox Racing	3	0	0	0	0	25	33rd
Total					10	0	0	0	0	50	
