= 2026 Triple Crown Series =

The 2026 Triple Crown Series was the 9th season of Canada's premier off-road motorcycle racing championship, since the series was acquired and rebranded in 2018.

As in the previous season, the championship was contested in the discipline of motocross only, with the individual class winners being crowned Canadian national champions.

American Phil Nicoletti was the defending champion in the 450 Pro class, after winning his first Canadian title in 2025. With Nicoletti only competing in one round, it was former champion Dylan Wright who took took the title, winning his sixth national motocross title overall after a championship battle with former MXGP rider Harri Kullas.

In the 250 Pro class, American rider Preston Kilroy was the defending champion, after he also claimed his first Canadian title in the previous season. After the first two rounds of the season, Kilroy moved up to the 450 Pro class, leaving the door open for Dylan Rempel to take his first national title. Rempel took two overall victories, proving more consistent throughout the season than young American competitor Ryder Malinoski.

== Calendar and Results ==
=== 450 Pro ===
| Round | Date | Location | Race 1 Winner | Race 2 Winner | Round Winner |
|---|---|---|---|---|---|
| 1 | June 7 | (Alberta) Calgary | (Canada) Dylan Wright | (Canada) Dylan Wright | (Canada) Dylan Wright |
| 2 | June 14 | (Manitoba) Pilot Mound | (Canada) Dylan Wright | (Canada) Dylan Wright | (Canada) Dylan Wright |
| 3 | June 28 | (Quebec) Ste-Julie | (Canada) Dylan Wright | (Canada) Dylan Wright | (Canada) Dylan Wright |
| 4 | July 5 | (Ontario) Courtland | (Canada) Dylan Wright | (Estonia) Harri Kullas | (Estonia) Harri Kullas |
| 5 | July 12 | (New Brunswick) Moncton | (Canada) Dylan Wright | (Estonia) Harri Kullas | (Estonia) Harri Kullas |
| 6 | July 19 | (Ontario) Ottawa | (Canada) Dylan Wright | (Canada) Dylan Wright | (Canada) Dylan Wright |
| 7 | July 26 | (Quebec) Deschambault | (Estonia) Harri Kullas | (Estonia) Harri Kullas | (Estonia) Harri Kullas |
| 8 | August 16 | (Ontario) Walton | (Canada) Dylan Wright | (United States) Preston Kilroy | (United States) Preston Kilroy |

=== 250 Pro ===
| Round | Date | Location | Race 1 Winner | Race 2 Winner | Round Winner |
|---|---|---|---|---|---|
| 1 | June 7 | (Alberta) Calgary | (United States) Preston Kilroy | (United States) Preston Kilroy | (United States) Preston Kilroy |
| 2 | June 14 | (Manitoba) Pilot Mound | (United States) Ryder Malinoski | (United States) Ryder Malinoski | (United States) Ryder Malinoski |
| 3 | June 28 | (Quebec) Ste-Julie | (United States) Ryder Malinoski | (United States) Kade Johnson | (United States) Kade Johnson |
| 4 | July 5 | (Ontario) Courtland | (Canada) Dylan Rempel | (United States) Ryder Malinoski | (United States) Ryder Malinoski |
| 5 | July 12 | (New Brunswick) Moncton | (Canada) Crayden Dillon | (Canada) Dylan Rempel | (Canada) Dylan Rempel |
| 6 | July 19 | (Ontario) Ottawa | (United States) Ryder Malinoski | (Canada) Dylan Rempel | (Canada) Dylan Rempel |
| 7 | July 26 | (Quebec) Deschambault | (United States) Ryder Malinoski | (United States) Ryder Malinoski | (United States) Ryder Malinoski |
| 8 | August 16 | (Ontario) Walton | (Canada) Dylan Rempel | (United States) Ryder Malinoski | (United States) Ryder Malinoski |

=== Track locations ===
2026 Triple Crown Series locations

== 450 ==
=== Entry list ===
| Team | Constructor | No | Rider | Rounds |
|---|---|---|---|---|
| Rockstar Energy Husqvarna | Husqvarna | 1 | (United States) Phil Nicoletti | 7 |
| MX101 FXR Yamaha | Yamaha | 2 | (United States) Preston Kilroy | 3–8 |
| MX101 FXR Yamaha | Yamaha | 15 | (Canada) Jess Pettis | 1–2 |
| Valley Yamaha | Yamaha | 5 | (Canada) Tyler Medaglia | 7 |
| Guaranteed Comfort Racing | Honda | 6 | (Canada) Ryder McNabb | 1, 6–8 |
| Guaranteed Comfort Racing | Honda | 36 | (Canada) Tyler Shewchyk | All |
| Honda Canada GDR Fox Racing | Honda | 9 | (Canada) Dylan Wright | All |
| Meston Transport/Baiku | Honda | 10 | (Canada) Keylan Meston | 1 |
| Motosport Saint-Césaire | Yamaha | 11 | (Canada) Noah Viney | 3–8 |
| Motosport Saint-Césaire | Yamaha | 131 | (France) Adrien Malaval | 7 |
| Motosport Saint-Césaire | Yamaha | 785 | (United States) Alexander Fedortsov | 7 |
| Kawasaki SSR Team | Kawasaki | 12 | (Canada) Sebastien Racine | 1–6 |
| Kawasaki SSR Team | Kawasaki | 527 | (Canada) Jake Tricco | 7–8 |
| Priority MX Thor Gas Gas Racing Team | Gas Gas | 14 | (Canada) Quinn Amyotte | All |
| Priority MX Thor Gas Gas Racing Team | Gas Gas | 84 | (Canada) Tanner Ward | All |
| Holeshot Motorsports | KTM | 18 | (Canada) Parker Eales | 1 |
| Dusty Rocks Yamaha | Yamaha | 19 | (Canada) Noah Porter | All |
| | Honda | 22 | (Canada) Tyler Gibbs | 6–8 |
| Morningstar Racing | KTM | 37 | (Canada) Payton Morningstar | 3–8 |
| Sport Tardif | Yamaha | 52 | (Canada) Zachary Rousseau | 3–4, 6–8 |
| AVL Husqvarna Racing Team | Husqvarna | 58 | (Canada) Blake Davies | All |
| AVL Husqvarna Racing Team | Husqvarna | 208 | (United States) Logan Leitzel | 5–8 |
| AVL Husqvarna Racing Team | Husqvarna | 377 | (Canada) Daniel Elmore | All |
| Blackfoot Motosports/Orange Brigade | KTM | 62 | (Canada) Danny Robertson | 1–2 |
| Évasion Sport | Yamaha | 65 | (Canada) Tommy Dallaire | 3–8 |
| CSC Services | Yamaha | 67 | (United States) Travis Delnicki | 3–4, 6 |
| | KTM | 69 | (Canada) Ryan Derry | 4, 6, 8 |
| McGrath Powersports | Husqvarna | 70 | (United States) Wyatt McGrath | 7 |
| | Gas Gas | 71 | (Canada) Guy Caron | 7 |
| | KTM | 77 | (Canada) Leith Ness | 3–4, 6 |
| | Kawasaki | 82 | (Canada) Alex Tremblay | 7 |
| | Gas Gas | 83 | (United States) Stephen Czarnota | 3 |
| The Feedway/FXR/Medicine Shoppe Canada | KTM | 85 | (Canada) Alex Gatt | All |
| | Yamaha | 88 | (United States) James Henshaw | 3–4, 6–7 |
| | Yamaha | 96 | (United States) Tyler Lowe | 6, 8 |
| Westside Powersports | Honda | 101 | (Canada) Bryce Wadge | 2 |
| | Yamaha | 125 | (United States) Grant Eckardt | 6 |
| Clyde River MX/Cold Coast Moto | Yamaha | 129 | (Canada) Cohen Nickerson | 5 |
| Grip N Rip MX | Honda | 132 | (Canada) Seth Hughes | All |
| | KTM | 144 | (Canada) Raphaël Lemieux | 3 |
| | Yamaha | 145 | (United States) Randy Simpson | 7 |
| KTM Canada Red Bull Racing Team | KTM | 151 | (Estonia) Harri Kullas | All |
| EVO Performance Suspension | Honda | 172 | (United States) Seth Kready | 3–8 |
| | Honda | 174 | (Canada) Nick Toews | 2 |
| Team VRP | Husqvarna | 180 | (Canada) Raphaël Gosselin | 3–8 |
| M&M Performance | Triumph | 187 | (Canada) Layne Nuyens | 1 |
| The McGinley Clinic Privateer Support Program | Yamaha | 188 | (United States) Ashton Arruda | 3 |
| Delpaggio Overhead Doors | Kawasaki | 190 | (Canada) Seth Palumbo | 3–4, 6–8 |
| | Husqvarna | 199 | (Canada) Travis Byrom | 3–8 |
| Beta Canada Team | Beta | 208 | (United States) Logan Leitzel | 1, 3 |
| | Triumph | 209 | (United States) Ty Newsome | 8 |
| | Yamaha | 211 | (Canada) William Lefebvre Côté | 3 |
| | Honda | 215 | (Canada) Louis-Philippe Cordeau | 3 |
| | KTM | 225 | (Canada) Tristan Dares | 4, 6 |
| Sport Collette Racing Team | Kawasaki | 237 | (Canada) Dylan Stephane | 3 |
| Accurate Racing | KTM | 250 | (Canada) Seth Pleice | 1 |
| FrederickTown Yamaha | Yamaha | 268 | (United States) Gage Stine | 3, 6 |
| Moto Adventure Kawasaki Money Inc Actionetix Racing | Kawasaki | 269 | (United States) Connor Stevenson | 8 |
| SAR Brandon/Fox Racing/Yamaha Canada | Yamaha | 270 | (Canada) Joshua Penner | 2 |
| Team LMR/RM Army/Full Circle Insurance Racing | Suzuki | 281 | (United States) Cory Carsten | 3–4 |
| Coastal Moto/Lightspeed DMS/APD Motorsports | Triumph | 328 | (United States) Talan Hansen | 5 |
| ASV | Husqvarna | 330 | (United States) Dane Morales | 4 |
| | Gas Gas | 345 | (United States) Joshua Prior | 3 |
| | KTM | 369 | (United States) Jack Neronha | 3–4, 6 |
| | Yamaha | 413 | (United States) Aaron Caballero | 4 |
| | Yamaha | 417 | (Canada) Jordan Toews | 2 |
| | Yamaha | 419 | (United States) Callen Young | 7–8 |
| Team Mountains Edge | Yamaha | 482 | (Canada) Teren Gerber | 1–2 |
| Pro Performance Portneuf/PWR Graphics | Husqvarna | 488 | (Canada) Jeffrey Denis | 3, 6–7 |
| | Yamaha | 499 | (United States) Bryant Humiston | 1–2 |
| Dirt-Care Moto | KTM | 515 | (Canada) Anthony Lebel | 3–4, 7–8 |
| | KTM | 521 | (Canada) Ed Jones | 3 |
| Trans Canada Motorsport/FXR | Yamaha | 557 | (Canada) Troy Horbaty | 2 |
| CCR Racing | Yamaha | 573 | (United States) Christopher Blackmer | 8 |
| | Yamaha | 610 | (Canada) Hayden Halstead | 5 |
| Picotte Motosport | Triumph | 611 | (Canada) David Bergeron | 7 |
| GA Checkpoint Yamaha | Yamaha | 623 | (Canada) Travis Gibbs | 1 |
| PDR Performance | Husqvarna | 625 | (United States) Austin Kienast | 2 |
| | Honda | 638 | (Canada) Lucas Giardino | 2 |
| Chambers Racing | Husqvarna | 661 | (United States) Noah Chambers | 3, 6 |
| | Gas Gas | 701 | (Canada) Zack Zager | 8 |
| | Yamaha | 711 | (Canada) Dany Munger | 7 |
| Mountains Edge Cycle & Sled | Yamaha | 737 | (Canada) Tee Perrott | All |
| | Yamaha | 757 | (Canada) Jesse Westfall | 2 |
| | Husqvarna | 775 | (United States) Johnathan Stasukelis | 3, 6–7 |
| | Honda | 777 | (Canada) Dario Zecca | 2 |
| Werks Triumph Racing | Triumph | 781 | (United States) Ryder Thompson | 8 |
| International Motorsports/Gas Gas Canada | Gas Gas | 819 | (Canada) Dawson Gravelle | 1 |
| | KTM | 835 | (United States) Conner Lords | 4 |
| Walker Motorsports | KTM | 841 | (United States) Jeff Walker | 6 |
| Coastal Motocross Team | Triumph | 910 | (Canada) Marcus Dureen | 3, 5 |
| Biese Brothers Racing | Kawasaki | 911 | (United States) Jordan Biese | 2, 4 |
| Kehoe Racing | Yamaha | 927 | (United States) Shane Kehoe | 4 |
| | Yamaha | 986 | (Canada) Carter Roberts | 4–6 |
| Jimmy Hebert Racing | Gas Gas | 997 | (United States) James Hebert | 7 |

=== Riders Championship ===
| Pos | Rider | Bike | CAL (Alberta) | | PIL (Manitoba) | | STJ (Quebec) | | COU (Ontario) | | MON (New Brunswick) | | OTT (Ontario) | | DES (Quebec) | | WAL (Ontario) | | Points |
|---|---|---|---|---|---|---|---|---|---|---|---|---|---|---|---|---|---|---|---|
| 1 | (Canada) Dylan Wright | Honda | 1 | 1 | 1 | 1 | 1 | 1 | 1 | 12 | 1 | 2 | 1 | 1 | 2 | 2 | 1 | 2 | 372 |
| 2 | (Estonia) Harri Kullas | KTM | 3 | 2 | 3 | 2 | 2 | 2 | 2 | 1 | 2 | 1 | 2 | 2 | 1 | 1 | 3 | 3 | 353 |
| 3 | (Canada) Tanner Ward | Gas Gas | 10 | 5 | 5 | 4 | 5 | 5 | 5 | 3 | 5 | 6 | 5 | 7 | 5 | 5 | 4 | 4 | 258 |
| 4 | (United States) Preston Kilroy | Yamaha | | | | | 3 | 3 | 4 | 2 | 3 | 3 | 3 | 3 | 3 | 3 | 2 | 1 | 247 |
| 5 | (Canada) Quinn Amyotte | Gas Gas | 6 | 8 | 7 | 6 | 7 | 7 | 6 | 5 | 6 | 5 | 6 | 5 | 6 | 17 | 8 | 6 | 225 |
| 6 | (Canada) Sebastien Racine | Kawasaki | 4 | 4 | 4 | 3 | 4 | 4 | 3 | 4 | 4 | 4 | 4 | 4 | | | | | 220 |
| 7 | (Canada) Daniel Elmore | Husqvarna | 7 | 6 | 6 | 5 | 6 | Ret | 8 | 6 | 7 | 7 | 8 | 6 | 10 | 8 | 5 | 5 | 215 |
| 8 | (Canada) Blake Davies | Husqvarna | Ret | 9 | 9 | 8 | 11 | 6 | 10 | 7 | 8 | 8 | 11 | 9 | 11 | 10 | 7 | 9 | 182 |
| 9 | (Canada) Noah Porter | Yamaha | 9 | 7 | 8 | 7 | 8 | 8 | 7 | 9 | 20 | 20 | 14 | 15 | 12 | 11 | 10 | 11 | 160 |
| 10 | (Canada) Ryder McNabb | Honda | 5 | 3 | | | | | | | | | 7 | 8 | 9 | 9 | 6 | 7 | 116 |
| 11 | (Canada) Noah Viney | Yamaha | | | | | 17 | 12 | 11 | 14 | 11 | 10 | 10 | 10 | 14 | 12 | 13 | 15 | 103 |
| 12 | (Canada) Payton Morningstar | KTM | | | | | 9 | Ret | 14 | 13 | 10 | 9 | 13 | 16 | 16 | Ret | 14 | 10 | 86 |
| 13 | (Canada) Tyler Shewchyk | Honda | 15 | 14 | 11 | 11 | 13 | 18 | 15 | 10 | 14 | 12 | 24 | 20 | 23 | Ret | 18 | 19 | 83 |
| 14 | (United States) Logan Leitzel | Beta | 8 | 10 | | | 14 | 10 | | | | | | | | | | | 79 |
| 14 | (United States) Logan Leitzel | Husqvarna | | | | | | | | | 9 | Ret | Ret | 12 | 21 | Ret | 9 | 17 | 79 |
| 15 | (Canada) Zachary Rousseau | Yamaha | | | | | 12 | 11 | 16 | 8 | | | 20 | 14 | 13 | 25 | 16 | 18 | 61 |
| 16 | (Canada) Tee Perrott | Yamaha | 16 | 13 | 13 | 10 | DNQ | DNQ | 23 | 24 | 13 | 13 | 25 | 27 | 24 | 16 | 22 | 16 | 58 |
| 17 | (United States) Seth Kready | Honda | | | | | 22 | 14 | 22 | 11 | 12 | 11 | 18 | 22 | 22 | 15 | 17 | 20 | 50 |
| 18 | (Canada) Jess Pettis | Yamaha | 2 | Ret | 2 | Ret | | | | | | | | | | | | | 44 |
| 19 | (Canada) Teren Gerber | Yamaha | 13 | 11 | 10 | 9 | | | | | | | | | | | | | 41 |
| 20 | (Canada) Tyler Gibbs | Honda | | | | | | | | | | | 12 | 11 | 15 | Ret | 15 | 13 | 40 |
| 21 | (United States) Gage Stine | Yamaha | | | | | 10 | 9 | | | | | 15 | 13 | | | | | 37 |
| 22 | (Canada) Travis Byrom | Husqvarna | | | | | 20 | 20 | 18 | 19 | 15 | 14 | 16 | 18 | 25 | 13 | 26 | 26 | 36 |
| 23 | (France) Adrien Malaval | Yamaha | | | | | | | | | | | | | 4 | 4 | | | 36 |
| 24 | (Canada) Tommy Dallaire | Yamaha | | | | | DNQ | DNQ | 19 | 18 | 17 | 16 | 17 | 19 | 19 | 14 | 19 | 25 | 31 |
| 25 | (Canada) Alex Gatt | KTM | 20 | 17 | 18 | 16 | 27 | 19 | 21 | 20 | 18 | 15 | 23 | Ret | 17 | Ret | 21 | 21 | 29 |
| 26 | (United States) Phil Nicoletti | Husqvarna | | | | | | | | | | | | | 7 | 6 | | | 29 |
| 27 | (Canada) Jake Tricco | Kawasaki | | | | | | | | | | | | | 18 | 19 | 12 | 8 | 27 |
| 28 | (Canada) Tyler Medaglia | Yamaha | | | | | | | | | | | | | 8 | 7 | | | 27 |
| 29 | (United States) Travis Delnicki | Yamaha | | | | | 19 | 16 | 13 | 15 | | | 19 | 23 | | | | | 23 |
| 30 | (Canada) Danny Robertson | KTM | 14 | 16 | 22 | 12 | | | | | | | | | | | | | 21 |
| 31 | (Canada) Raphaël Gosselin | Husqvarna | | | | | 16 | 15 | 17 | 17 | Ret | DNS | 22 | 21 | 20 | DNS | 28 | Ret | 20 |
| 32 | (Canada) Parker Eales | KTM | 11 | 12 | | | | | | | | | | | | | | | 19 |
| 33 | (United States) Christopher Blackmer | Yamaha | | | | | | | | | | | | | | | 11 | 12 | 19 |
| 34 | (United States) Jordan Biese | Kawasaki | | | 12 | 13 | | | Ret | Ret | | | | | | | | | 17 |
| 35 | (United States) Jeff Walker | KTM | | | | | | | | | | | 9 | 17 | | | | | 16 |
| 36 | (Canada) Seth Hughes | Honda | 17 | 18 | 16 | 18 | 23 | Ret | 28 | 22 | 21 | Ret | 26 | 24 | 26 | 21 | 24 | 22 | 15 |
| 37 | (United States) Bryant Humiston | Yamaha | 18 | 19 | 17 | 15 | | | | | | | | | | | | | 15 |
| 38 | (Canada) Keylan Meston | Honda | 12 | 15 | | | | | | | | | | | | | | | 15 |
| 39 | (United States) Stephen Czarnota | Gas Gas | | | | | 15 | 13 | | | | | | | | | | | 14 |
| 40 | (Canada) Bryce Wadge | Honda | | | 15 | 14 | | | | | | | | | | | | | 13 |
| 41 | (United States) Cory Carsten | Suzuki | | | | | Ret | 23 | 9 | 21 | | | | | | | | | 12 |
| 42 | (Canada) Joshua Penner | Yamaha | | | 14 | 17 | | | | | | | | | | | | | 11 |
| 43 | (United States) Dane Morales | Husqvarna | | | | | | | 12 | Ret | | | | | | | | | 9 |
| 44 | (Canada) Hayden Halstead | Yamaha | | | | | | | | | 16 | 19 | | | | | | | 7 |
| 45 | (United States) Ryder Thompson | Triumph | | | | | | | | | | | | | | | 23 | 14 | 7 |
| 46 | (Canada) Leith Ness | KTM | | | | | 21 | Ret | 20 | 16 | | | 21 | 29 | | | | | 6 |
| 47 | (Canada) Carter Roberts | Yamaha | | | | | | | DNQ | DNQ | 19 | 17 | DNQ | DNQ | | | | | 6 |
| 48 | (Canada) Anthony Lebel | KTM | | | | | 24 | 17 | DNQ | DNQ | | | | | Ret | 20 | 25 | 24 | 5 |
| 49 | (Canada) Layne Nuyens | Triumph | 19 | 20 | | | | | | | | | | | | | | | 3 |
| 50 | (United States) Ashton Arruda | Yamaha | | | | | 18 | Ret | | | | | | | | | | | 3 |
| 51 | (Canada) Marcus Dureen | Triumph | | | | | DNQ | Ret | | | 22 | 18 | | | | | | | 3 |
| 52 | (Canada) Alex Tremblay | Kawasaki | | | | | | | | | | | | | Ret | 18 | | | 3 |
| 53 | (United States) Austin Kienast | Husqvarna | | | 21 | 19 | | | | | | | | | | | | | 2 |
| 54 | (Canada) Troy Horbaty | Yamaha | | | 20 | 20 | | | | | | | | | | | | | 2 |
| 55 | (Canada) Jesse Westfall | Yamaha | | | 19 | Ret | | | | | | | | | | | | | 2 |
| 56 | (United States) Connor Stevenson | Kawasaki | | | | | | | | | | | | | | | 20 | 23 | 1 |
| | (Canada) Cohen Nickerson | Yamaha | | | | | | | | | 23 | 21 | | | | | | | 0 |
| | (Canada) Jordan Toews | Yamaha | | | 24 | 21 | | | | | | | | | | | | | 0 |
| | (Canada) William Lefebvre Côté | Yamaha | | | | | 26 | 21 | | | | | | | | | | | 0 |
| | (Canada) Seth Pleice | KTM | Ret | 21 | | | | | | | | | | | | | | | 0 |
| | (Canada) Dawson Gravelle | Gas Gas | 21 | Ret | | | | | | | | | | | | | | | 0 |
| | (Canada) Nick Toews | Honda | | | 23 | 22 | | | | | | | | | | | | | 0 |
| | (United States) Talan Hansen | Triumph | | | | | | | | | 24 | 22 | | | | | | | 0 |
| | (United States) Noah Chambers | Husqvarna | | | | | 25 | 22 | | | | | DNQ | DNQ | | | | | 0 |
| | (Canada) David Bergeron | Triumph | | | | | | | | | | | | | DNQ | 22 | | | 0 |
| | (United States) James Henshaw | Yamaha | | | | | DNQ | DNQ | 25 | 23 | | | DNQ | DNQ | DNQ | DNQ | | | 0 |
| | (Canada) Lucas Giardino | Honda | | | Ret | 23 | | | | | | | | | | | | | 0 |
| | (Canada) Seth Palumbo | Kawasaki | | | | | DNQ | DNQ | 24 | 28 | | | DNQ | 25 | DNQ | DNQ | 29 | 29 | 0 |
| | (Canada) Ryan Derry | KTM | | | | | | | 27 | 25 | | | 28 | 26 | | | 27 | 27 | 0 |
| | (United States) Jack Neronha | KTM | | | | | Ret | Ret | 26 | 27 | | | 27 | DNS | | | | | 0 |
| | (United States) Aaron Caballero | Yamaha | | | | | | | DNQ | 26 | | | | | | | | | 0 |
| | (United States) Tyler Lowe | Yamaha | | | | | | | | | | | 29 | 28 | | | DNQ | Ret | 0 |
| | (United States) Callen Young | Yamaha | | | | | | | | | | | | | DNQ | DNQ | 30 | 28 | 0 |
| | (United States) Wyatt McGrath | Husqvarna | | | | | | | | | | | | | Ret | Ret | | | 0 |
| | (United States) Alexander Fedortsov | Yamaha | | | | | | | | | | | | | Ret | DNS | | | 0 |
| | (Canada) Raphaël Lemieux | KTM | | | | | Ret | DNS | | | | | | | | | | | 0 |
| | (Canada) Dario Zecca | Honda | | | Ret | DNS | | | | | | | | | | | | | 0 |
| | (Canada) Travis Gibbs | Yamaha | Ret | DNS | | | | | | | | | | | | | | | 0 |
| | (Canada) Tristan Dares | KTM | | | | | | | DNS | DNS | | | DNQ | DNQ | | | | | 0 |
| | (Canada) Jeffrey Denis | Husqvarna | | | | | DNQ | DNQ | | | | | DNQ | DNQ | DNQ | DNQ | | | 0 |
| | (United States) Johnathan Stasukelis | Husqvarna | | | | | DNQ | DNQ | | | | | DNQ | DNQ | DNQ | DNQ | | | 0 |
| | (Canada) Louis-Philippe Cordeau | Honda | | | | | DNQ | DNQ | | | | | | | | | | | 0 |
| | (Canada) Ed Jones | KTM | | | | | DNQ | DNQ | | | | | | | | | | | 0 |
| | (Canada) Dylan Stephane | Kawasaki | | | | | DNQ | DNQ | | | | | | | | | | | 0 |
| | (United States) Joshua Prior | Gas Gas | | | | | DNQ | DNQ | | | | | | | | | | | 0 |
| | (United States) Conner Lords | KTM | | | | | | | DNQ | DNQ | | | | | | | | | 0 |
| | (United States) Shane Kehoe | Yamaha | | | | | | | DNQ | DNQ | | | | | | | | | 0 |
| | (United States) Grant Eckardt | Yamaha | | | | | | | | | | | DNQ | DNQ | | | | | 0 |
| | (Canada) Dany Munger | Yamaha | | | | | | | | | | | | | DNQ | DNQ | | | 0 |
| | (United States) Randy Simpson | Yamaha | | | | | | | | | | | | | DNQ | DNQ | | | 0 |
| | (United States) James Hebert | Gas Gas | | | | | | | | | | | | | DNQ | DNQ | | | 0 |
| | (Canada) Guy Caron | Gas Gas | | | | | | | | | | | | | DNQ | DNQ | | | 0 |
| | (Canada) Zack Zager | Gas Gas | | | | | | | | | | | | | | | DNQ | DNQ | 0 |
| | (United States) Ty Newsome | Triumph | | | | | | | | | | | | | | | DNQ | DNQ | 0 |
| Pos | Rider | Bike | CAL (Alberta) | | PIL (Manitoba) | | STJ (Quebec) | | COU (Ontario) | | MON (New Brunswick) | | OTT (Ontario) | | DES (Quebec) | | WAL (Ontario) | | Points |

== 250 ==
=== Entry list ===
| Team | Constructor | No | Rider | Rounds |
|---|---|---|---|---|
| MX101 FXR Yamaha | Yamaha | 1 | (United States) Preston Kilroy | 1–2 |
| MX101 FXR Yamaha | Yamaha | 31 | (United States) Ryder Malinoski | All |
| MX101 FXR Yamaha | Yamaha | 555 | (Canada) Zach Phifer | 1–2, 8 |
| Brentwood Roofing | KTM | 16 | (Canada) Tanner Scott | All |
| VIP Academy MX/DW Performance | Yamaha | 17 | (United States) Carson Fields | 4 |
| Platto Energy Drink | KTM | 20 | (Canada) Jeremy McKie | 3–7 |
| Honda Canada GDR Fox Racing | Honda | 24 | (Canada) Dylan Rempel | All |
| Priority MX Thor Gas Gas Racing Team | Gas Gas | 25 | (Canada) Cole Pranger | All |
| AVL Husqvarna Racing Team | Husqvarna | 27 | (United States) Josh Boaz | All |
| AVL Husqvarna Racing Team | Husqvarna | 126 | (Canada) Ayrton Pomeroy | All |
| AVL Husqvarna Racing Team | Husqvarna | 158 | (Canada) Nathan Snelgrove | All |
| | Gas Gas | 28 | (Canada) Sam Gaynor | 5 |
| Central Mass Powersports | Kawasaki | 29 | (United States) Kyle Murdoch | 3–5 |
| Kawasaki SSR Team | Kawasaki | 29 | (United States) Kyle Murdoch | 6–8 |
| Kawasaki SSR Team | Kawasaki | 227 | (United States) Vincent Wey | 1–3 |
| Dusty Rocks Yamaha | Yamaha | 32 | (Canada) Liam Dodds | 3–8 |
| Dusty Rocks Yamaha | Yamaha | 188 | (Canada) Chase Nemeth | 8 |
| Smokin Joes Speed and Style | Gas Gas | 33 | (United States) Joe Tait | 3–4, 6 |
| Motosport Saint-Césaire | Yamaha | 35 | (Canada) Nathan Germain | 3–8 |
| Motosport Saint-Césaire | Yamaha | 43 | (Canada) Corentin Dietz | 3–8 |
| Motosport Saint-Césaire | Yamaha | 199 | (Canada) Lucas Rhéaume | 6–7 |
| JC Powersports/Mr. Lube + Tires | Yamaha | 38 | (Canada) Zach Ufimzeff | All |
| Long Live The King Racing | Husqvarna | 41 | (Canada) Jayden Riley | All |
| Long Live The King Racing | Husqvarna | 54 | (Canada) Jacob Frederickson | All |
| Coffrage Évolution/JPF KTM | KTM | 42 | (Canada) Danik Paradis | All |
| Fortin Racing | Gas Gas | 45 | (United States) Lawrence Fortin | 3–4, 6–8 |
| | Yamaha | 51 | (United States) Josh Clark | 1–4 |
| Mathias Sports/KTM Canada | KTM | 55 | (Canada) Alex Guadagno | 1, 3 |
| BFD Moto/CJR Suspension | Gas Gas | 63 | (Canada) Mars Millar | All |
| Guaranteed Comfort Racing | Honda | 64 | (Canada) Wyatt Kerr | 1–2 |
| Guaranteed Comfort Racing | Honda | 273 | (United States) Carson Fields | 6–8 |
| | Husqvarna | 68 | (United States) Nick McDonnell | 3–4, 6–8 |
| Grégoire Sport | Yamaha | 71 | (Canada) Xavier Beaulieu | 3 |
| KTM Canada Red Bull Racing Team | KTM | 73 | (Canada) Crayden Dillon | 4–8 |
| | Kawasaki | 82 | (Canada) Alex Tremblay | 3 |
| Harrington Racing | KTM | 87 | (United States) James Harrington | 7 |
| | Yamaha | 88 | (United States) James Henshaw | 7 |
| | Suzuki | 92 | (United States) Cameron Dufault | 3, 8 |
| | KTM | 93 | (Canada) Kaes Knights | All |
| Peeweecycle.com/Epic Powersports/SC3 Designs | KTM | 100 | (United States) Cale Kuchnicki | All |
| Team Balboa | Kawasaki | 101 | (Canada) Ludovik Rivard | 5, 7 |
| | Gas Gas | 103 | (United States) Lehi Dummar | 1 |
| Lloydminster Honda Powersports | Honda | 112 | (Canada) Bentley Tondu | 1 |
| | Husqvarna | 118 | (Canada) Garret Banman | 2 |
| | Yamaha | 119 | (Canada) Cristopher Da Silva | 3–7 |
| Shake N Bake/Ken Bland MX Schools | Husqvarna | 132 | (Canada) Matthew Doan | 6 |
| Team Extreme MX | Yamaha | 133 | (Canada) Ethan Douglas | 2 |
| | Honda | 149 | (Canada) Jared Petruska | 1 |
| Blackfoot Motosports/KTM Canada | KTM | 150 | (Canada) Dexter Seitz | 1–2 |
| | Yamaha | 150 | (Canada) Brett Young | 5 |
| | Husqvarna | 151 | (United States) Michael Williams | 3, 6 |
| | Gas Gas | 152 | (Canada) Brody Craig | 3–4, 6, 8 |
| Ringia Farms Race Team | Yamaha | 154 | (Canada) Thor Giesbrecht | 3–4, 6–8 |
| Team Extreme MX | Yamaha | 157 | (Canada) Cole Dekoninck | 1–2 |
| | Kawasaki | 160 | (Canada) Blake Bransfield | 5 |
| | Yamaha | 167 | (Canada) Dylan Hansen | 1 |
| Northside Motorsports Edson | Yamaha | 168 | (Canada) Chaz Collins | 1 |
| | Husqvarna | 171 | (Canada) Nathan Fraser | 5 |
| Monster Energy Team Green Kawasaki | Kawasaki | 177 | (United States) Kade Johnson | 1–5 |
| | Honda | 178 | (Canada) Jaxon Wiebe | 2 |
| | Husqvarna | 185 | (Canada) Kadin Hall | 4, 6 |
| | Honda | 195 | (Canada) Drake Plotts | 1–2 |
| McGinley Clinic Privateer Support Program | KTM | 197 | (United States) Brian Saunier | 7 |
| | Triumph | 198 | (Canada) Antoine Poirier | 3 |
| | Husqvarna | 210 | (Canada) Zavier Pitre | 3 |
| | KTM | 212 | (Canada) Niko Holmes | 2–8 |
| Yamaha Canada/GA Checkpoint Yamaha | Yamaha | 214 | (Canada) Tyler Gibbs | 1 |
| | KTM | 214 | (Canada) Ryan Mott | 3–8 |
| | Husqvarna | 221 | (Canada) Mason Litwin | 2 |
| Troy Lee Designs/Foothills Motorsports | Husqvarna | 223 | (United States) Logan Riggins | 6–7 |
| | Yamaha | 224 | (Canada) Theo Lavoie | 2 |
| | KTM | 225 | (Canada) Tristan Dares | 4, 7 |
| Riverside Motosports | Yamaha | 228 | (Canada) Ryden Safron | 1–2, 6–8 |
| | Stark | 234 | (Canada) Bryton Gammon | 5 |
| | KTM | 236 | (United States) Austin Schafer | 8 |
| | KTM | 240 | (Canada) Kyle Gonzalez | 4 |
| Riderz/KTM Canada | KTM | 247 | (Canada) Tegan Kortenbach | All |
| Lahman Racing | Yamaha | 252 | (United States) Zachary Lahman | 3, 6 |
| | Suzuki | 252 | (Canada) Tyler Herkert | 5 |
| | Kawasaki | 271 | (Canada) Jagger Wall | 2 |
| | Yamaha | 277 | (Canada) Seth Unrau | 1–2 |
| ASV | Husqvarna | 330 | (United States) Dane Morales | 6–7 |
| Biese Brothers Racing | Kawasaki | 343 | (United States) Carter Biese | 2, 4 |
| | Yamaha | 354 | (Canada) Riley Pilsner | 1 |
| | Husqvarna | 368 | (United States) Maxwell Mayer | 6 |
| Sc Racewear/Illusive Gloves/ODI Grips | Husqvarna | 387 | (Canada) Landon Hunt | 3–4, 6 |
| Maslak Racing | Yamaha | 392 | (United States) Pawel Maslak | 6–8 |
| BFR Moto Crew | KTM | 394 | (Australia) Xavier Peterson | 1 |
| | Yamaha | 400 | (United States) Samuel Greenawalt | 3 |
| | KTM | 411 | (Canada) Duncan Macleod | 1 |
| | Yamaha | 415 | (Canada) Matthew Thompson | 2 |
| Quad Expert/Yamaha Canada | Yamaha | 423 | (Canada) Russell Morin | 3, 6 |
| | Yamaha | 445 | (Canada) Campbell Searle | 4 |
| | Yamaha | 448 | (Canada) Jordan Potvin | 6 |
| Midwest MX Academy/Team Green Kawasaki | Kawasaki | 457 | (United States) Jayden Wolf | 8 |
| Peccarelli Racing | Kawasaki | 505 | (United States) Nick Peccarelli | 6–7 |
| | KTM | 510 | (Canada) Zakary Corriveau | 3–4, 6–7 |
| | Honda | 517 | (Canada) Nate Cormier | 3, 5 |
| Goulet Moto | KTM | 558 | (Canada) Maxim Levert | 3, 7 |
| Dirt Care USA | KTM | 575 | (United States) TJ Lanphear | 6–7 |
| | KTM | 605 | (United States) Blake Broderick | 1 |
| | Kawasaki | 611 | (Canada) Jake Drysdale | 5 |
| Mistelbacher Construction | KTM | 617 | (Canada) Benjamin Mistelbacher | 3, 5–8 |
| Loud Racing | KTM | 655 | (United States) Tyler Loud | 3–4, 6 |
| Alex White Racing | KTM | 659 | (United States) Alex White | 3, 5, 7 |
| | Suzuki | 703 | (United States) Jay Olsen | 1 |
| Firstbike Motorsports/ASL Systems | Kawasaki | 714 | (United States) Angelo Mazza | 8 |
| | KTM | 715 | (Canada) Hunter Cranston | 1–2, 5–7 |
| | KTM | 726 | (Canada) Antony Viger | 7 |
| Mosites Motorsports | Kawasaki | 734 | (United States) Reece Wheaton | 3 |
| HVR Powersports | KTM | 736 | (United States) Jace Allred | 8 |
| Gaudins Honda/Otoole Autobody | Honda | 745 | (Canada) Jayden Ostazewski | 1–2, 8 |
| | Yamaha | 751 | (Canada) Reid Westfall | 2 |
| Builder's Capital | KTM | 761 | (Canada) Cass Loutitt | 1–4, 6 |
| | Stark | 762 | (United States) Kelana Humphrey | 3 |
| Titan Racing/Clare's Cycle | KTM | 767 | (Canada) Justin Barnhart | 6–7 |
| | Gas Gas | 781 | (Canada) Zack Zager | 4 |
| | Yamaha | 864 | (Canada) Chris Holland | 8 |
| Merge Racing/Troy Lee Designs | Yamaha | 866 | (Canada) Drew Roberts | 4–6, 8 |
| | KTM | 878 | (Canada) Sam Blouin | 7 |
| Callus Moto | Husqvarna | 880 | (Canada) Johnson Boyd | 3–5, 7 |
| | KTM | 881 | (Canada) Kobi Cox | 5, 8 |
| Whelen Engineering/Canvas MX | KTM | 884 | (United States) Jason White | 3, 5 |
| | Gas Gas | 888 | (Canada) Graham Klassen | 2 |
| | Yamaha | 900 | (Canada) Christian Sparks | 7 |
| Scott Macneil Motors & RV | Yamaha | 909 | (Canada) Aston Vickers | 5 |
| | Stark | 946 | (Canada) Austin King | 5 |
| Neff Racing | Suzuki | 959 | (United States) Axel Neff | 3–5, 7–8 |
| Platinum Recreation/Phase Moto/ADV | Yamaha | 976 | (Canada) Joseph Pilsner | 1–2 |
| | KTM | 990 | (Canada) Lane Kretzel | 6–8 |

=== Riders Championship ===
| Pos | Rider | Bike | CAL (Alberta) | | PIL (Manitoba) | | STJ (Quebec) | | COU (Ontario) | | MON (New Brunswick) | | OTT (Ontario) | | DES (Quebec) | | WAL (Ontario) | | Points |
|---|---|---|---|---|---|---|---|---|---|---|---|---|---|---|---|---|---|---|---|
| 1 | (Canada) Dylan Rempel | Honda | 2 | 2 | 6 | 6 | 8 | 2 | 1 | 2 | 2 | 1 | 2 | 1 | 2 | 2 | 1 | 2 | 341 |
| 2 | (United States) Ryder Malinoski | Yamaha | 9 | 3 | 1 | 1 | 1 | 3 | 2 | 1 | 4 | 2 | 1 | 19 | 1 | 1 | 2 | 1 | 338 |
| 3 | (United States) Josh Boaz | Husqvarna | 6 | 5 | 12 | 7 | 6 | 4 | 7 | 11 | 5 | 3 | 3 | 3 | 3 | 4 | 3 | 4 | 263 |
| 4 | (Canada) Zach Ufimzeff | Yamaha | 11 | 8 | 11 | 10 | 12 | 7 | 12 | 12 | 10 | 9 | 14 | 4 | 7 | 12 | 14 | 9 | 175 |
| 5 | (Canada) Tanner Scott | KTM | 5 | 29 | 10 | 15 | 9 | 9 | 6 | 8 | 11 | 6 | 9 | 15 | 9 | 11 | 10 | 8 | 174 |
| 6 | (Canada) Tegan Kortenbach | KTM | 10 | 7 | 9 | 9 | 13 | 5 | 9 | 9 | 3 | 10 | Ret | DNS | DNS | DNS | 5 | 7 | 158 |
| 7 | (Canada) Crayden Dillon | KTM | | | | | | | 4 | Ret | 1 | 4 | 4 | 8 | 6 | 5 | 4 | 5 | 157 |
| 8 | (United States) Kade Johnson | Kawasaki | 4 | 4 | 4 | 4 | 3 | 1 | 3 | 3 | Ret | DNS | | | | | | | 157 |
| 9 | (Canada) Jayden Riley | Husqvarna | Ret | 9 | 8 | 11 | 10 | 8 | 11 | 7 | Ret | 35 | 10 | 6 | 10 | 14 | 8 | 11 | 150 |
| 10 | (Canada) Nathan Germain | Yamaha | | | | | 4 | 6 | 8 | 16 | 9 | 5 | 13 | 10 | 5 | 6 | 12 | 17 | 142 |
| 11 | (United States) Kyle Murdoch | Kawasaki | | | | | 15 | 11 | 10 | 4 | 8 | 7 | 6 | 2 | 4 | 7 | DNS | DNS | 141 |
| 12 | (Canada) Cole Pranger | Gas Gas | Ret | 11 | 7 | 8 | 5 | 15 | 15 | 13 | DNS | DNS | 7 | 18 | 24 | 16 | 13 | 6 | 118 |
| 13 | (United States) Vincent Wey | Kawasaki | 3 | 12 | 2 | 2 | 2 | Ret | | | | | | | | | | | 95 |
| 14 | (Canada) Liam Dodds | Yamaha | | | | | 26 | 22 | 17 | 20 | 6 | 13 | 11 | 11 | 12 | 8 | 9 | 12 | 91 |
| 15 | (United States) Preston Kilroy | Yamaha | 1 | 1 | 3 | 3 | | | | | | | | | | | | | 90 |
| 16 | (Canada) Danik Paradis | KTM | 13 | 14 | 20 | 18 | 20 | 14 | 19 | 14 | 12 | 12 | 16 | 14 | 14 | 10 | 19 | 24 | 86 |
| 17 | (United States) Lawrence Fortin | Gas Gas | | | | | Ret | 17 | 16 | 15 | | | 12 | 7 | 8 | 9 | 15 | 10 | 80 |
| 18 | (Canada) Jeremy McKie | KTM | | | | | 14 | 10 | Ret | 10 | 7 | 8 | Ret | 5 | 16 | DNS | | | 77 |
| 19 | (United States) Joe Tait | Gas Gas | | | | | 11 | 13 | 5 | 5 | | | 5 | Ret | | | | | 66 |
| 20 | (Canada) Wyatt Kerr | Honda | 7 | 6 | 5 | 5 | | | | | | | | | | | | | 61 |
| 21 | (United States) Carson Fields | Yamaha | | | | | | | 14 | 6 | | | | | | | | | 57 |
| 21 | (United States) Carson Fields | Honda | | | | | | | | | | | 8 | 9 | Ret | DNS | 11 | Ret | 57 |
| 22 | (Canada) Ayton Pomeroy | Husqvarna | 16 | 16 | 26 | 17 | 17 | 18 | 26 | 25 | 18 | 17 | 20 | 16 | 17 | 22 | DNQ | 15 | 44 |
| 23 | (Canada) Mars Millar | Gas Gas | 14 | Ret | 18 | 21 | 16 | 23 | 18 | 19 | 13 | 14 | Ret | 24 | 22 | 23 | Ret | 13 | 43 |
| 24 | (Canada) Drew Roberts | Yamaha | | | | | | | 13 | 18 | 15 | 11 | 19 | 12 | | | Ret | 19 | 40 |
| 25 | (United States) Josh Clark | Yamaha | 12 | 13 | 19 | 13 | 19 | 16 | DNQ | DNQ | | | | | | | | | 34 |
| 26 | (United States) Jace Allred | KTM | | | | | | | | | | | | | | | 7 | 3 | 34 |
| 27 | (Canada) Jacob Frederickson | Husqvarna | 21 | 15 | Ret | 19 | Ret | 20 | 25 | 23 | 14 | 15 | 25 | 29 | 20 | 19 | 18 | 16 | 33 |
| 28 | (United States) James Harrington | KTM | | | | | | | | | | | | | 11 | 3 | | | 30 |
| 29 | (Canada) Zach Phifer | Yamaha | 23 | 21 | 14 | 14 | | | | | | | | | | | 16 | 14 | 26 |
| 30 | (United States) Logan Riggins | Husqvarna | | | | | | | | | | | 15 | 13 | 18 | 13 | | | 25 |
| 31 | (Canada) Tyler Gibbs | Yamaha | 8 | 10 | | | | | | | | | | | | | | | 24 |
| 32 | (United States) Reece Wheaton | Kawasaki | | | | | 7 | 12 | | | | | | | | | | | 23 |
| 33 | (Canada) Johnson Boyd | Husqvarna | | | | | Ret | DNS | 28 | 17 | 16 | Ret | | | 15 | 15 | | | 21 |
| 34 | (United States) Carter Biese | Kawasaki | | | 13 | 12 | | | DNQ | DNQ | | | | | | | | | 17 |
| 35 | (Canada) Corentin Dietz | Yamaha | | | | | 22 | 28 | Ret | Ret | 22 | 18 | 21 | 21 | 13 | 18 | 20 | 31 | 15 |
| 36 | (Canada) Kaes Knights | KTM | Ret | Ret | 17 | 20 | 25 | 24 | 23 | 30 | 17 | 16 | 28 | 23 | 28 | 20 | 21 | 23 | 15 |
| 37 | (United States) Austin Schafer | KTM | | | | | | | | | | | | | | | 6 | Ret | 15 |
| 38 | (United States) Cale Kuchnicki | Gas Gas | 20 | 17 | 16 | 22 | 28 | 29 | 21 | 22 | 19 | 19 | 30 | 32 | 30 | 27 | 31 | 29 | 14 |
| 39 | (Canada) Cole Dekoninck | Yamaha | 18 | 23 | 15 | 16 | | | | | | | | | | | | | 14 |
| 40 | (Canada) Niko Holmes | KTM | | | 24 | 24 | 30 | Ret | 22 | 21 | 26 | 24 | 18 | 27 | 25 | 31 | 17 | 20 | 8 |
| 41 | (United States) Dane Morales | Husqvarna | | | | | | | | | | | 17 | 17 | DNQ | DNQ | | | 8 |
| 42 | (Canada) Dexter Seitz | KTM | 15 | 20 | Ret | DNS | | | | | | | | | | | | | 7 |
| 43 | (Canada) Duncan Macleod | KTM | 17 | 19 | | | | | | | | | | | | | | | 6 |
| 44 | (United States) Blake Broderick | KTM | 19 | 18 | | | | | | | | | | | | | | | 5 |
| 45 | (Canada) Maxim Levert | KTM | | | | | 23 | 21 | | | | | | | Ret | 17 | | | 4 |
| 46 | (Canada) Jayden Ostazewski | Honda | 30 | 26 | 25 | 23 | | | | | | | | | | | 24 | 18 | 3 |
| 47 | (Canada) Benjamin Mistelbacher | KTM | | | | | 18 | Ret | | | 23 | 22 | 33 | 26 | 35 | 25 | 22 | 26 | 3 |
| 48 | (United States) Nick McDonnell | Husqvarna | | | | | DNQ | 27 | 20 | Ret | | | 24 | 25 | 19 | 24 | 25 | Ret | 3 |
| 49 | (Canada) Christopher Da Silva | Yamaha | | | | | Ret | 26 | 32 | 29 | 20 | 20 | 29 | 28 | 26 | 29 | | | 2 |
| 50 | (Canada) Alex Tremblay | Kawasaki | | | | | 21 | 19 | | | | | | | | | | | 2 |
| 51 | (United States) TJ Lanphear | KTM | | | | | | | | | | | 23 | 20 | 27 | 28 | | | 1 |
| | (Canada) Thor Giesbrecht | Yamaha | | | | | 33 | 32 | 27 | 28 | | | 22 | 22 | 21 | 21 | Ret | 27 | 0 |
| | (Canada) Sam Gaynor | Gas Gas | | | | | | | | | 21 | 21 | | | | | | | 0 |
| | (United States) Axel Neff | Suzuki | | | | | 24 | 25 | 24 | 24 | 24 | DNS | | | Ret | 32 | 28 | 21 | 0 |
| | (Canada) Nathan Snelgrove | Husqvarna | 25 | 28 | 21 | 29 | 32 | 31 | 33 | 31 | 28 | 27 | 35 | 37 | Ret | DNS | 32 | 35 | 0 |
| | (Canada) Chaz Collins | Yamaha | 22 | 22 | | | | | | | | | | | | | | | 0 |
| | (Canada) Chase Nemeth | Yamaha | | | | | | | | | | | | | | | 23 | 22 | 0 |
| | (Canada) Ryden Safron | Yamaha | 24 | 25 | 22 | 25 | | | | | | | DNQ | DNQ | DNQ | DNQ | 33 | 36 | 0 |
| | (Canada) Ryan Mott | KTM | | | | | DNQ | 30 | 29 | 35 | 25 | 23 | 27 | 30 | 29 | Ret | 26 | 30 | 0 |
| | (Canada) Seth Unrau | Yamaha | 27 | 27 | 23 | 26 | | | | | | | | | | | | | 0 |
| | (Canada) Lucas Rhéaume | Yamaha | | | | | | | | | | | 31 | Ret | 23 | 34 | | | 0 |
| | (Canada) Cass Loutitt | KTM | 28 | 24 | 29 | 27 | DNQ | DNQ | Ret | DNS | | | DNQ | DNQ | | | | | 0 |
| | (Canada) Brody Craig | Gas Gas | | | | | 31 | 35 | 31 | 26 | | | DNQ | DNQ | | | 27 | 25 | 0 |
| | (Canada) Brett Young | Yamaha | | | | | | | | | 29 | 25 | | | | | | | 0 |
| | (United States) Alex White | KTM | | | | | DNQ | DNQ | | | 27 | 26 | | | DNQ | 33 | | | 0 |
| | (Canada) Lane Kretzel | KTM | | | | | | | | | | | 34 | 34 | 32 | 26 | 30 | 28 | 0 |
| | (Canada) Kadin Hall | Husqvarna | | | | | | | 30 | Ret | | | 26 | 33 | | | | | 0 |
| | (Canada) Drake Plotts | Honda | 26 | 33 | 36 | 35 | | | | | | | | | | | | | 0 |
| | (Canada) Garret Banman | Husqvarna | | | 27 | 30 | | | | | | | | | | | | | 0 |
| | (Canada) Landon Hunt | Husqvarna | | | | | DNQ | DNQ | 34 | 27 | | | 37 | 35 | | | | | 0 |
| | (United States) Kelana Humphrey | Stark | | | | | 27 | Ret | | | | | | | | | | | 0 |
| | (Canada) Nate Cormier | Honda | | | | | DNQ | DNQ | | | 31 | 28 | | | | | | | 0 |
| | (Canada) Matthew Thompson | Yamaha | | | 28 | 32 | | | | | | | | | | | | | 0 |
| | (Canada) Ethan Douglas | Yamaha | | | 37 | 28 | | | | | | | | | | | | | 0 |
| | (Australia) Xavier Peterson | KTM | 29 | 31 | | | | | | | | | | | | | | | 0 |
| | (United States) Cameron Dufault | Suzuki | | | | | Ret | DNS | | | | | | | | | 29 | 33 | 0 |
| | (United States) Samuel Greenawalt | Yamaha | | | | | 29 | 33 | | | | | | | | | | | 0 |
| | (Canada) Ludovik Rivard | Kawasaki | | | | | | | | | 34 | 29 | | | DNQ | DNQ | | | 0 |
| | (Canada) Antony Viger | KTM | | | | | | | | | | | | | 31 | 30 | | | 0 |
| | (Canada) Blake Bransfield | Kawasaki | | | | | | | | | 32 | 30 | | | | | | | 0 |
| | (Canada) Nathan Fraser | Husqvarna | | | | | | | | | 30 | 32 | | | | | | | 0 |
| | (United States) Lehi Dummar | Gas Gas | Ret | 30 | | | | | | | | | | | | | | | 0 |
| | (Canada) Jaxon Wiebe | Honda | | | 30 | Ret | | | | | | | | | | | | | 0 |
| | (Canada) Joseph Pilsner | Yamaha | 31 | Ret | 32 | 31 | | | | | | | | | | | | | 0 |
| | (United States) Pawel Maslak | Yamaha | | | | | | | | | | | 32 | 31 | 33 | Ret | 35 | 32 | 0 |
| | (Canada) Reid Westfall | Yamaha | | | 31 | 33 | | | | | | | | | | | | | 0 |
| | (Canada) Bryton Gammon | Stark | | | | | | | | | 33 | 31 | | | | | | | 0 |
| | (Canada) Bentley Tondu | Honda | 32 | 32 | | | | | | | | | | | | | | | 0 |
| | (Canada) Zakary Corriveau | KTM | | | | | DNQ | 34 | DNQ | 32 | | | DNQ | DNQ | DNQ | DNQ | | | 0 |
| | (United States) Jay Olsen | Suzuki | 33 | 34 | | | | | | | | | | | | | | | 0 |
| | (Canada) Mason Litwin | Husqvarna | | | 33 | Ret | | | | | | | | | | | | | 0 |
| | (United States) Jason White | KTM | | | | | DNQ | DNQ | | | DNQ | 33 | | | | | | | 0 |
| | (Canada) Zack Zager | Gas Gas | | | | | | | DNQ | 33 | | | | | | | | | 0 |
| | (Canada) Kobi Cox | KTM | | | | | | | | | Ret | 36 | | | | | 34 | 34 | 0 |
| | (Canada) Theo Lavoie | Yamaha | | | 34 | 34 | | | | | | | | | | | | | 0 |
| | (Canada) Tristan Dares | KTM | | | | | | | 35 | DNS | | | | | 34 | DNS | | | 0 |
| | (United States) Tyler Loud | KTM | | | | | DNQ | DNQ | 36 | 34 | | | DNQ | 38 | | | | | 0 |
| | (Canada) Austin King | Stark | | | | | | | | | Ret | 34 | | | | | | | 0 |
| | (Canada) Jagger Wall | Kawasaki | | | 35 | 36 | | | | | | | | | | | | | 0 |
| | (Canada) Hunter Cranston | KTM | Ret | DNS | DNS | DNS | | | | | 35 | Ret | DNQ | DNQ | DNQ | DNQ | | | 0 |
| | (Canada) Jordan Potvin | Yamaha | | | | | | | | | | | 36 | 36 | | | | | 0 |
| | (Canada) Jake Drysdale | Kawasaki | | | | | | | | | 36 | 37 | | | | | | | 0 |
| | (Canada) Alex Guadagno | KTM | DNQ | DNQ | | | Ret | DNS | | | | | | | | | | | 0 |
| | (United States) Jayden Wolf | Kawasaki | | | | | | | | | | | | | | | Ret | DNS | 0 |
| | (Canada) Sam Blouin | KTM | | | | | | | | | | | | | Ret | DNS | | | 0 |
| | (Canada) Campbell Searle | Yamaha | | | | | | | Ret | DNS | | | | | | | | | 0 |
| | (Canada) Zavier Pitre | Husqvarna | | | | | Ret | DNS | | | | | | | | | | | 0 |
| | (Canada) Dylan Hansen | Yamaha | Ret | DNS | | | | | | | | | | | | | | | 0 |
| | (Canada) Chris Holland | Yamaha | | | | | | | | | | | | | | | DNQ | Ret | 0 |
| | (Canada) Jared Petruska | Honda | DNS | DNS | | | | | | | | | | | | | | | 0 |
| | (Canada) Russell Morin | Yamaha | | | | | DNQ | DNQ | | | | | DNQ | DNQ | | | | | 0 |
| | (United States) Michael Williams | Husqvarna | | | | | DNQ | DNQ | | | | | DNQ | DNQ | | | | | 0 |
| | (United States) Zachary Lahman | Yamaha | | | | | DNQ | DNQ | | | | | DNQ | DNQ | | | | | 0 |
| | (Canada) Justin Barnhart | KTM | | | | | | | | | | | DNQ | DNQ | DNQ | DNQ | | | 0 |
| | (United States) Nick Peccarelli | Kawasaki | | | | | | | | | | | DNQ | DNQ | DNQ | DNQ | | | 0 |
| | (Canada) Riley Pilsner | Yamaha | DNQ | DNQ | | | | | | | | | | | | | | | 0 |
| | (Canada) Graham Klassen | Gas Gas | | | DNQ | DNQ | | | | | | | | | | | | | 0 |
| | (Canada) Xavier Beaulieu | Yamaha | | | | | DNQ | DNQ | | | | | | | | | | | 0 |
| | (Canada) Antoine Poirier | Triumph | | | | | DNQ | DNQ | | | | | | | | | | | 0 |
| | (Canada) Kyle Gonzalez | KTM | | | | | | | DNQ | DNQ | | | | | | | | | 0 |
| | (Canada) Ashton Vickers | Yamaha | | | | | | | | | DNQ | DNQ | | | | | | | 0 |
| | (Canada) Tyler Herkert | Suzuki | | | | | | | | | DNQ | DNQ | | | | | | | 0 |
| | (Canada) Matthew Doan | Husqvarna | | | | | | | | | | | DNQ | DNQ | | | | | 0 |
| | (United States) Maxwell Mayer | Husqvarna | | | | | | | | | | | DNQ | DNQ | | | | | 0 |
| | (United States) James Henshaw | Yamaha | | | | | | | | | | | | | DNQ | DNQ | | | 0 |
| | (United States) Brian Saunier | KTM | | | | | | | | | | | | | DNQ | DNQ | | | 0 |
| | (Canada) Christian Sparks | Yamaha | | | | | | | | | | | | | DNQ | DNQ | | | 0 |
| | (United States) Angelo Mazza | Kawasaki | | | | | | | | | | | | | | | DNQ | DNQ | 0 |
| Pos | Rider | Bike | CAL (Alberta) | | PIL (Manitoba) | | STJ (Quebec) | | COU (Ontario) | | MON (New Brunswick) | | OTT (Ontario) | | DES (Quebec) | | WAL (Ontario) | | Points |
