= 2021 FIM Motocross World Championship =

Motocross championship season

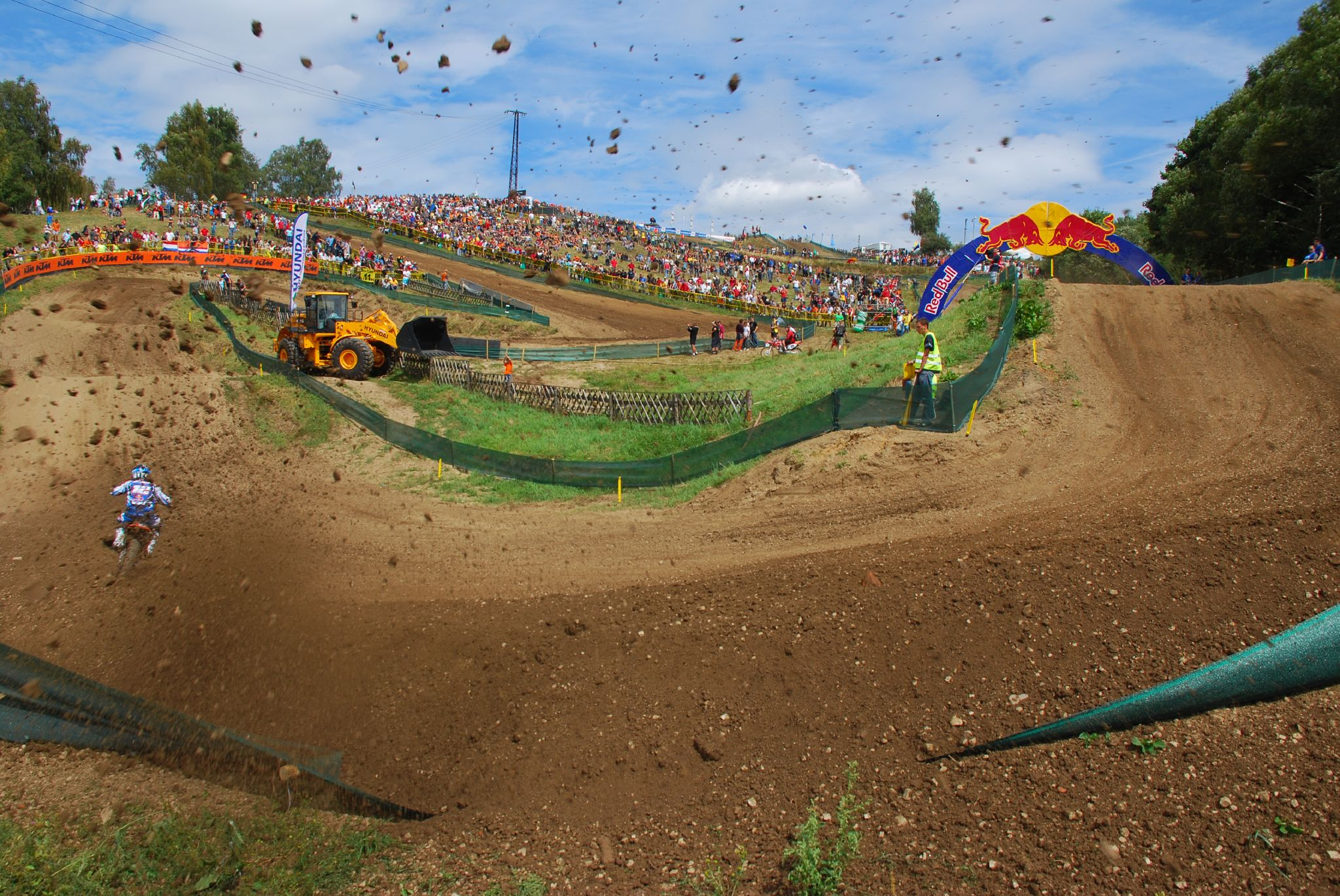
- Loket circuit venue of GP of the Czech Republic.
- Organizer: FIM
- Duration: 13 June/5 December
- Races: 18
- Manufacturers: 7 (MXGP)
- Teams: 23 (MXGP)
- Drivers: 56 (MXGP)

Champions
- MXGP: (Netherlands) Jeffrey Herlings
- MX2: (France) Maxime Renaux
- Women: (New Zealand) Courtney Duncan

FIM Motocross World Championship
- ← 2020 2022 →

The 2021 FIM Motocross World Championship was the 65th FIM Motocross World Championship season.

In the MXGP class, Tim Gajser started the season as the reigning champion after picking up his fourth world title in 2020. In MX2, Tom Vialle was the defending champion as he picked up his maiden world title in the previous year. The 2021 season saw the debut of Beta as a manufacturer in the MXGP class.

== Race calendar and results ==
The championship was contested over eighteen rounds.

Russian athletes competed as a neutral competitors using the designation MFR (Motorcycle Federation of Russia), as the Court of Arbitration for Sport upheld a ban on Russia competing at World Championships. The ban was implemented by the World Anti-Doping Agency in response to state-sponsored doping program of Russian athletes.

=== MXGP ===
Round	Date	Grand Prix	Location	Race 1 Winner	Race 2 Winner	Round Winner	Report
1	13 June	MXGP of Russia	Orlyonok	(Slovenia) Tim Gajser	(Slovenia) Tim Gajser	(Slovenia) Tim Gajser	
2	27 June	(United Kingdom) MXGP of Great Britain	Matterley Basin	(Italy) Tony Cairoli	(Slovenia) Tim Gajser	(Italy) Tony Cairoli	
3	4 July	MXGP of Italy	Maggiora	(France) Romain Febvre	(Netherlands) Jeffrey Herlings	(Netherlands) Jeffrey Herlings	
4	18 July	MXGP of Netherlands	Oss	(Netherlands) Jeffrey Herlings	(Italy) Tony Cairoli	(Slovenia) Tim Gajser	
5	25 July	MXGP of Czech Republic	Loket	(Spain) Jorge Prado	(Italy) Tony Cairoli	(Spain) Jorge Prado	
6	1 August	MXGP of Flanders	Lommel	(Netherlands) Jeffrey Herlings	(France) Romain Febvre	(France) Romain Febvre	
7	8 August	MXGP of Latvia	Ķegums	(Netherlands) Jeffrey Herlings	(Spain) Jorge Prado	(Slovenia) Tim Gajser	
8	5 September	MXGP of Turkey	Afyonkarahisar	(Netherlands) Jeffrey Herlings	(Slovenia) Tim Gajser	(Netherlands) Jeffrey Herlings	
9	8 September	(Turkey) MXGP of Afyon	Afyonkarahisar	(Netherlands) Jeffrey Herlings	(Slovenia) Tim Gajser	(Netherlands) Jeffrey Herlings	
10	19 September	(Sardinia) MXGP of Sardegna	Riola Sardo	(Netherlands) Jeffrey Herlings	(Netherlands) Jeffrey Herlings	(Netherlands) Jeffrey Herlings	
11	3 October	MXGP of Germany	Teutschenthal	(Spain) Jorge Prado	(Slovenia) Tim Gajser	(Slovenia) Tim Gajser	
12	10 October	MXGP of France	Lacapelle-Marival	(France) Romain Febvre	(Netherlands) Jeffrey Herlings	(Netherlands) Jeffrey Herlings	
13	17 October	MXGP of Spain	intu Xanadú	(France) Romain Febvre	(Netherlands) Jeffrey Herlings	(Netherlands) Jeffrey Herlings	
14	24 October	MXGP of Trentino	Pietramurata	(Netherlands) Jeffrey Herlings	(Netherlands) Jeffrey Herlings	(Netherlands) Jeffrey Herlings	
15	27 October	(Italy) MXGP of Pietramurata	Pietramurata	(France) Romain Febvre	(Italy) Tony Cairoli	(Italy) Tony Cairoli	
16	31 October	(Italy) MXGP of Garda	Pietramurata	(Switzerland) Jeremy Seewer	(Slovenia) Tim Gajser	(Switzerland) Jeremy Seewer	
17	7 November	(Lombardy) MXGP of Lombardia	Mantova	(France) Romain Febvre	(Netherlands) Jeffrey Herlings	(Netherlands) Jeffrey Herlings	
18	10 November	(Italy) MXGP of Città di Mantova	Mantova	(Netherlands) Jeffrey Herlings	(Netherlands) Jeffrey Herlings	(Netherlands) Jeffrey Herlings	

=== MX2 ===
Round	Date	Grand Prix	Location	Race 1 Winner	Race 2 Winner	Round Winner	Report
1	13 June	MXGP of Russia	Orlyonok	(France) Tom Vialle	(France) Tom Vialle	(France) Tom Vialle	
2	27 June	(United Kingdom) MXGP of Great Britain	Matterley Basin	(France) Maxime Renaux	(Italy) Mattia Guadagnini	(France) Maxime Renaux	
3	4 July	MXGP of Italy	Maggiora	(France) Thibault Benistant	(Italy) Mattia Guadagnini	(Italy) Mattia Guadagnini	
4	18 July	MXGP of Netherlands	Oss	(Belgium) Jago Geerts	(Belgium) Jago Geerts	(Belgium) Jago Geerts	
5	25 July	MXGP of Czech Republic	Loket	(Italy) Mattia Guadagnini	(France) Thibault Benistant	(Italy) Mattia Guadagnini	
6	1 August	MXGP of Flanders	Lommel	(Belgium) Jago Geerts	(Netherlands) Kay de Wolf	(Belgium) Jago Geerts	
7	8 August	MXGP of Latvia	Ķegums	(France) Maxime Renaux	(France) Maxime Renaux	(France) Maxime Renaux	
8	5 September	MXGP of Turkey	Afyonkarahisar	(France) Tom Vialle	(France) Maxime Renaux	(France) Tom Vialle	
9	8 September	(Turkey) MXGP of Afyon	Afyonkarahisar	(France) Maxime Renaux	(France) Tom Vialle	(France) Tom Vialle	
10	19 September	(Sardinia) MXGP of Sardegna	Riola Sardo	(France) Tom Vialle	(France) Tom Vialle	(France) Tom Vialle	
11	3 October	MXGP of Germany	Teutschenthal	(France) Tom Vialle	(France) Maxime Renaux	(France) Maxime Renaux	
12	10 October	MXGP of France	Lacapelle-Marival	(France) Tom Vialle	(France) Tom Vialle	(France) Tom Vialle	
13	17 October	MXGP of Spain	intu Xanadú	(France) Tom Vialle	(France) Maxime Renaux	(France) Maxime Renaux	
14	24 October	MXGP of Trentino	Pietramurata	(France) Tom Vialle	(France) Tom Vialle	(France) Tom Vialle	
15	27 October	(Italy) MXGP of Pietramurata	Pietramurata	(France) Tom Vialle	(Austria) Rene Hofer	(Austria) Rene Hofer	
16	31 October	(Italy) MXGP of Garda	Pietramurata	(Austria) Rene Hofer	(France) Maxime Renaux	(France) Maxime Renaux	
17	7 November	(Lombardy) MXGP of Lombardia	Mantova	(France) Maxime Renaux	(Belgium) Jago Geerts	(Belgium) Jago Geerts	
18	10 November	(Italy) MXGP of Città di Mantova	Mantova	(Belgium) Jago Geerts	(France) Maxime Renaux	(Belgium) Jago Geerts	

== MXGP ==
=== Entry list ===
Officially Approved Teams & Riders
Team	Constructor	No	Rider	Rounds
Monster Energy Kawasaki Racing Team	Kawasaki	3	(France) Romain Febvre	All
Monster Energy Kawasaki Racing Team	Kawasaki	128	(Italy) Ivo Monticelli	1–8
Monster Energy Kawasaki Racing Team	Kawasaki	172	(France) Mathys Boisramé	14–18
Hostettler Yamaha Racing	Yamaha	4	(Switzerland) Arnaud Tonus	1–3, 8–16
Hostettler Yamaha Racing	Yamaha	92	(Switzerland) Valentin Guillod	2, 5–7, 9–10, 12–18
Hostettler Yamaha Racing	Yamaha	998	(United Kingdom) Todd Kellett	6
Rockstar Energy Husqvarna Factory Racing Team	Husqvarna	7	(Lithuania) Arminas Jasikonis	2–13, 17–18
Rockstar Energy Husqvarna Factory Racing Team	Husqvarna	19	(Denmark) Thomas Kjær Olsen	All
Team Gebben Van Venrooy Yamaha Racing	Yamaha	10	(Netherlands) Calvin Vlaanderen	1–13
Team Gebben Van Venrooy Yamaha Racing	Yamaha	22	(Belgium) Kevin Strijbos	All
Team Gebben Van Venrooy Yamaha Racing	Yamaha	32	(Belgium) Brent Van Doninck	All
Honda SR Motoblouz	Honda	16	(France) Benoît Paturel	8–18
Honda SR Motoblouz	Honda	107	(Netherlands) Lars van Berkel	6–7
Honda SR Motoblouz	Honda	991	(United Kingdom) Nathan Watson	1–4
JD Gunnex KTM Racing Team	KTM	17	(Spain) José Butrón	5, 13–17
JD Gunnex KTM Racing Team	KTM	183	(Venezuela) Lorenzo Locurcio	1–9, 13–17
JD Gunnex KTM Racing Team	KTM	881	(Czech Republic) Dušan Drdaj	8–9
JWR Honda Racing	Honda	18	Vsevolod Brylyakov	1, 3–9, 11–18
JWR Honda Racing	Honda	147	(Finland) Miro Sihvonen	1, 4, 11–18
SS24 KTM MXGP	KTM	24	(United Kingdom) Shaun Simpson	1–6, 10–18
JM Honda Racing	Honda	29	(Germany) Henry Jacobi	All
JM Honda Racing	Honda	202	(Belgium) Yentel Martens	4
JM Honda Racing	Honda	747	(Italy) Michele Cervellin	6–7
KMP Honda Racing	Honda	37	(Estonia) Gert Krestinov	11
KMP Honda Racing	Honda	152	(Bulgaria) Petar Petrov	2, 11
KMP Honda Racing	Honda	926	(Belgium) Jérémy Delincé	6
Standing Construct GasGas Factory Racing	Gas Gas	41	(Latvia) Pauls Jonass	1–17
Standing Construct GasGas Factory Racing	Gas Gas	189	(Netherlands) Brian Bogers	2–15, 17–18
Team HRC	Honda	43	(Australia) Mitchell Evans	
Team HRC	Honda	70	(Spain) Rubén Fernández	17–18
Team HRC	Honda	243	(Slovenia) Tim Gajser	All
Red Bull KTM De Carli Factory Racing	KTM	61	(Spain) Jorge Prado	All
Red Bull KTM De Carli Factory Racing	KTM	222	(Italy) Tony Cairoli	All
Marchetti Racing Team KTM	KTM	77	(Italy) Alessandro Lupino	All
Red Bull KTM Factory Racing	KTM	84	(Netherlands) Jeffrey Herlings	1–4, 6–18
Beta SDM Corse MX Team	Beta	89	(Belgium) Jeremy Van Horebeek	All
Beta SDM Corse MX Team	Beta	520	(France) Jimmy Clochet	2–7, 11
Monster Energy Yamaha Factory MXGP Team	Yamaha	91	(Switzerland) Jeremy Seewer	All
Monster Energy Yamaha Factory MXGP Team	Yamaha	259	(Netherlands) Glenn Coldenhoff	All
Monster Energy Yamaha Factory MXGP Team	Yamaha	919	(United Kingdom) Ben Watson	All
JK Racing	Yamaha	161	(Sweden) Alvin Östlund	1–10
JK Racing	Yamaha	667	(Sweden) Anton Nordström Graaf	11–13, 15–18
KTM Kosak Team	KTM	226	(Germany) Tom Koch	2, 5–7, 10–18
Motostar.se	Husqvarna	297	(Sweden) Anton Gole	2–5, 7
SM Action GasGas Racing Team Yuasa Battery	Gas Gas	303	(Italy) Alberto Forato	2–18
Hitachi KTM fuelled by Milwaukee	KTM	811	(United Kingdom) Adam Sterry	1–6, 10–11
JT911 KTM Racing Team	KTM	911	(France) Jordi Tixier	1–2, 5–7
Wild Card Teams & Riders
Team	Constructor	No	Rider	Rounds
Ghidinelli Racing Yamaha	Yamaha	15	(Italy) David Philippaerts	14–17
Team GSM Dafy Michelin Yamaha	Yamaha	21	(France) Maxime Desprey	12
MB Team	Honda	44	(Italy) Morgan Lesiardo	3, 10–12
Gabriel Motocross KTM	KTM	49	(United Kingdom) John Adamson	2
REVO Seven Kawasaki	Kawasaki	53	(New Zealand) Dylan Walsh	6
Team AB Racing	Husqvarna	66	(Germany) Tim Koch	11
Sahkar Racing	KTM	75	(Estonia) Hardi Roosiorg	6–7, 11, 17–18
	Kawasaki	79	(France) Timothée Hoarau	14–18
AIT Racing Team	Husqvarna	97	(Bulgaria) Michael Ivanov	10
KTM Sarholz Racing Team	KTM	105	(Belgium) Cyril Genot	6
Team CKK	Honda	107	(Netherlands) Lars van Berkel	4
Team Bauerschmidt MB33	Husqvarna	108	(Germany) Stefan Ekerold	11
GDR Honda	Honda	109	(Canada) Dylan Wright	14–18
	Husqvarna	123	Georgy Valyakin	1
De Jong Racing Team Andre Motors KTM	KTM	130	(Netherlands) Rene de Jong	4–6
Cab Screens Crescent Yamaha Racing	Yamaha	151	(Estonia) Harri Kullas	2
JH MX Service	Gas Gas	194	(Netherlands) Sven van der Mierden	4, 6
Renter Racing	KTM	197	(Slovakia) Denis Poláš	17–18
SHR Motorsports	Yamaha	262	(Germany) Mike Stender	11
Team 3C Racing	Yamaha	267	(Italy) Edoardo Bersanelli	3, 5, 16
PAR Homes RFX Husqvarna	Husqvarna	326	(United Kingdom) Josh Gilbert	2, 4, 11–12, 14–16
PAR Homes RFX Husqvarna	Husqvarna	777	Evgeny Bobryshev	6
Team Borz MX School	Honda	333	(Italy) Luca Borz	16
Goby Racing	Gas Gas	338	(France) David Herbreteau	12
	Husqvarna	425	Alexander Shershnev	1
Gabrielli Moto Racing Team	Husqvarna	644	(Italy) Ismaele Guarise	16
SVR Motorsport	Husqvarna	701	Svyatoslav Pronenko	1
FB Factory Motorsport	Husqvarna	831	(France) Brice Maylin	12
Team JCR	Kawasaki	848	(Spain) Joan Cros	13
AL860 Motorsport	KTM	860	(Italy) Andrea La Scala	18
Zatika AV92 Husqvarna	Husqvarna	920	(Spain) Ander Valentín	17–18

==== Riders Championship ====
Pos	Nr	Rider	Bike	RUS (Russia)		GBR (United Kingdom)		ITA (Italy)		NED (Netherlands)		CZE (Czech Republic)		FLA (Flanders)		LAT (Latvia)		TUR (Turkey)		AFY (Turkey)		SAR (Sardinia)		GER (Germany)		FRA (France)		ESP (Spain)		TRE		PIE (Italy)		GAR (Italy)		LOM		CDM (Italy)		Points
1	84	(Netherlands) Jeffrey Herlings	KTM	4	2	3	4	6	1	1	DNS			1	5	1	4	1	2	1	2	1	1	2	3	2	1	3	1	1	1	Ret	4	3	4	2	1	1	1	708
2	3	(France) Romain Febvre	Kawasaki	2	6	7	2	1	12	4	4	3	10	2	1	5	3	4	4	4	5	3	3	4	2	1	2	1	7	3	4	1	5	2	3	1	2	2	3	703
3	243	(Slovenia) Tim Gajser	Honda	1	1	4	1	5	6	3	2	2	15	7	4	2	2	6	1	3	1	19	8	3	1	6	3	4	2	4	3	2	3	4	1	8	3	3	2	688
4	91	(Switzerland) Jeremy Seewer	Yamaha	6	5	8	5	8	8	5	10	5	2	5	8	9	7	7	7	14	13	6	5	8	5	3	6	5	8	2	5	4	2	1	2	5	5	4	4	566
5	61	(Spain) Jorge Prado	KTM	9	8	2	7	2	7	6	3	1	3	6	3	4	1	2	3	21	4	2	2	1	DNS	16	12	2	3	8	17	5	Ret	7	6	6	6	5	7	562
6	222	(Italy) Tony Cairoli	KTM	3	Ret	1	3	3	3	8	1	6	1	3	7	3	6	5	5	2	3	DNS	DNS	5	10	5	4	7	4	Ret	Ret	3	1	5	5	3	4	Ret	5	545
7	259	(Netherlands) Glenn Coldenhoff	Yamaha	10	18	5	9	4	2	2	22	4	4	9	13	7	Ret	8	11	8	19	10	10	7	6	13	8	10	14	5	2	7	6	6	8	11	12	8	8	442
8	41	(Latvia) Pauls Jonass	Gas Gas	Ret	3	6	6	7	4	7	13	Ret	6	4	2	6	15	3	Ret	5	6	13	6	6	4	4	5	6	5	6	12	17	10	Ret	DNS	DNS	DNS			391
9	19	(Denmark) Thomas Kjær Olsen	Husqvarna	8	7	14	12	22	19	13	12	Ret	11	8	18	Ret	8	10	15	12	9	8	13	12	13	8	10	11	12	7	16	8	7	12	12	7	10	6	13	332
10	77	(Italy) Alessandro Lupino	KTM	5	4	9	13	18	9	14	14	8	8	30	23	8	9	13	6	9	8	Ret	18	Ret	11	9	13	14	10	10	15	13	13	8	13	10	9	23	12	319
11	919	(United Kingdom) Ben Watson	Yamaha	20	21	11	10	9	11	9	6	11	12	12	9	13	10	20	19	11	21	7	7	13	8	19	20	19	DNS	15	7	6	9	10	7	17	13	9	14	300
12	189	(Netherlands) Brian Bogers	Gas Gas			13	17	27	18	12	5	18	Ret	11	11	10	5	11	12	17	10	5	9	9	7	20	14	13	6	20	13	11	8			12	8	10	5	290
13	89	(Belgium) Jeremy Van Horebeek	Beta	11	11	15	8	11	10	17	Ret	7	9	16	Ret	18	Ret	15	16	20	Ret	Ret	Ret	10	9	Ret	9	16	15	12	22	10	12	11	14	Ret	11	13	9	232
14	10	(Netherlands) Calvin Vlaanderen	Yamaha	12	15	17	11	14	Ret	10	7	9	Ret	10	10	Ret	11	18	8	13	Ret	4	4	11	Ret	Ret	7	12	16											203
15	29	(Germany) Henry Jacobi	Honda	Ret	Ret	Ret	14	17	5	20	16	10	16	Ret	Ret	11	14	9	14	7	11	14	14	20	Ret	Ret	18	26	13	Ret	11	9	11	16	Ret	Ret	15	11	Ret	188
16	32	(Belgium) Brent Van Doninck	Yamaha	7	17	24	18	10	24	Ret	9	Ret	DNS	18	16	15	19	14	10	10	15	18	11	24	15	15	Ret	22	21	Ret	Ret	Ret	18	17	15	14	17	17	17	152
17	24	(United Kingdom) Shaun Simpson	KTM	17	16	16	25	15	14	16	17	17	7	13	Ret							12	12	18	19	Ret	25	15	22	19	14	Ret	20	14	16	16	23	16	18	126
18	303	(Italy) Alberto Forato	Gas Gas			31	31	25	21	21	24	23	14	14	14	19	12	17	18	6	7	Ret	16	14	14	10	11	21	23	Ret	DNS	18	24	22	Ret	15	19	DNS	DNS	119
19	4	(Switzerland) Arnaud Tonus	Yamaha	15	9	10	19	21	16									12	13	16	12	16	19	19	Ret	7	Ret	9	11	17	18	23	Ret	DNS	DNS					119
20	16	(France) Benoît Paturel	Honda															23	23	24	17	11	Ret	16	16	12	15	8	9	14	6	Ret	14	Ret	9	Ret	16	DNS	DNS	110
21	22	(Belgium) Kevin Strijbos	Yamaha	16	12	12	16	19	13	15	18	Ret	Ret	Ret	Ret	14	16	Ret	9	15	23	15	21	15	12	Ret	23	27	DNS	16	23	19	23	Ret	Ret	28	Ret	Ret	20	106
22	7	(Lithuania) Arminas Jasikonis	Husqvarna			Ret	24	23	26	11	8	13	Ret	19	6	DNS	DNS	22	17	19	18	9	Ret	21	18	11	16	24	25							18	Ret	14	15	103
23	226	(Germany) Tom Koch	KTM			29	32					15	20	Ret	19	17	13					17	17	22	Ret	22	22	23	20	11	8	15	15	19	20	21	21	18	16	76
24	109	(Canada) Dylan Wright	Honda																											13	21	12	17	9	10	13	14	15	11	75
25	172	(France) Mathys Boisramé	Kawasaki																											9	9	Ret	19	24	11	9	Ret	7	Ret	62
26	70	(Spain) Rubén Fernández	Honda																																	4	7	12	6	56
27	128	(Italy) Ivo Monticelli	Kawasaki	Ret	DNS	22	23	12	20	18	11	14	5	26	Ret	16	18	DNS	DNS																					54
28	161	(Sweden) Alvin Östlund	Yamaha	14	14	19	28	13	15	Ret	15	16	23	23	Ret	20	24	16	Ret	22	20	20	20																	50
29	92	(Switzerland) Valentin Guillod	Yamaha			20	22					24	21	22	24	24	22			18	16	22	22			21	21	17	24	Ret	10	16	16	13	18	29	20	20	19	49
30	183	(Venezuela) Lorenzo Locurcio	KTM	19	22	23	20	24	25	19	Ret	12	17	31	Ret	21	17	21	21	Ret	14							18	18	Ret	20	21	21	15	17	20	24			47
31	18	Vsevolod Brylyakov	Honda	23	19			28	23	23	19	21	18	28	25	Ret	Ret	19	20	Ret	22			17	21	14	17	20	17	Ret	Ret	14	26	20	Ret	19	18	19	Ret	45
32	811	(United Kingdom) Adam Sterry	KTM	21	13	18	15	16	Ret	26	20	19	13	21	22							21	15	Ret	DNS															39
33	911	(France) Jordi Tixier	KTM	13	10	21	21					20	22	17	Ret	12	21																							33
34	105	(Belgium) Cyril Genot	KTM											15	12																									15
35	326	(United Kingdom) Josh Gilbert	Husqvarna			30	30			Ret	Ret													23	17	17	19			Ret	24	20	Ret	21	21					11
36	17	(Spain) José Butrón	KTM									22	19															25	19	18	19	Ret	22	23	19	22	22			11
37	777	Evgeny Bobryshev	Husqvarna											Ret	15																									6
38	107	(Netherlands) Lars van Berkel	Honda							22	23			20	17	22	23																							5
39	520	(France) Jimmy Clochet	Beta			Ret	Ret	30	17	Ret	26	25	24	Ret	Ret	27	Ret							Ret	26															4
40	991	(United Kingdom) Nathan Watson	Honda	18	20	25	29	26	Ret	24	21																													4
41	15	(Italy) David Philippaerts	Yamaha																											Ret	Ret	22	Ret	18	Ret	27	Ret			3
42	21	(France) Maxime Desprey	Yamaha																							18	Ret													3
43	75	(Estonia) Hardi Roosiorg	KTM											27	21	23	20							27	Ret											26	26	21	21	1
44	297	(Sweden) Anton Gole	Husqvarna			28	27	20	22	Ret	Ret	DNS	DNS			25	Ret																							1
45	44	(Italy) Morgan Lesiardo	Honda					Ret	Ret													23	Ret	25	20	23	Ret													1
46	998	(United Kingdom) Todd Kellett	Yamaha											24	20																									1
	147	(Finland) Miro Sihvonen	Honda	22	Ret					27	Ret													Ret	25	DNS	DNS	29	26	Ret	Ret	24	25	26	22	24	25	Ret	DNS	0
	881	(Czech Republic) Dušan Drdaj	KTM															24	22	23	Ret																			0
	920	(Spain) Ander Valentin	Husqvarna																																	25	Ret	22	Ret	0
	197	(Slovakia) Denis Poláš	KTM																																	30	28	Ret	22	0
	108	(Germany) Stefan Ekerold	Husqvarna																					Ret	22															0
	667	(Sweden) Anton Nordström Graaf	Yamaha																					Ret	DNS	24	Ret	28	27			Ret	27	25	23	23	27	Ret	DNS	0
	97	(Bulgaria) Michael Ivanov	Husqvarna																			24	23																	0
	860	(Italy) Andrea La Scala	KTM																																			24	23	0
	123	Georgy Valyakin	Husqvarna	25	23																																			0
	37	(Estonia) Gert Krestinov	Honda																					28	23															0
	79	(France) Timothée Hoarau	Kawasaki																											Ret	25	25	28	30	27	31	29	25	24	0
	267	(Italy) Edoardo Bersanelli	Yamaha					29	27			27	26																					27	24					0
	66	(Germany) Tim Koch	Husqvarna																					26	24															0
	701	Svyatoslav Pronenko	Husqvarna	24	Ret																																			0
	338	(France) David Herbreteau	Gas Gas																							Ret	24													0
	194	(Netherlands) Sven van der Mierden	Gas Gas							25	25			29	26																									0
	130	(Netherlands) Rene de Jong	KTM							Ret	Ret	26	25	32	Ret																									0
	831	(France) Brice Maylin	Husqvarna																							25	26													0
	333	(Italy) Luca Borz	Honda																															28	25					0
	926	(Belgium) Jérémy Delincé	Honda											25	Ret																									0
	747	(Italy) Michele Cervellin	Honda											Ret	27	26	Ret																							0
	151	(Estonia) Harri Kullas	Yamaha			27	26																																	0
	644	(Italy) Ismaele Guarise	Husqvarna																															29	26					0
	152	(Bulgaria) Petar Petrov	Honda			26	Ret																	Ret	DNS															0
	425	Alexander Shershnev	Husqvarna	26	Ret																																			0
	848	(Spain) Joan Cros	Kawasaki																									30	28											0
	202	(Belgium) Yentel Martens	Honda							28	Ret																													0
	49	(United Kingdom) John Adamson	KTM			Ret	33																																	0
	53	(New Zealand) Dylan Walsh	Kawasaki											Ret	Ret																									0
	262	(Germany) Mike Stender	Yamaha																					Ret	DNS															0
Pos	Nr	Rider	bike	RUS (Russia)		GBR (United Kingdom)		ITA (Italy)		NED (Netherlands)		CZE (Czech Republic)		FLA (Flanders)		LAT (Latvia)		TUR (Turkey)		AFY (Turkey)		SAR (Sardinia)		GER (Germany)		FRA (France)		ESP (Spain)		TRE		PIE (Italy)		GAR (Italy)		LOM		CDM (Italy)		Points

==== Manufacturers Championship ====
Pos	Bike	RUS (Russia)		GBR (United Kingdom)		ITA (Italy)		NED (Netherlands)		CZE (Czech Republic)		FLA (Flanders)		LAT (Latvia)		TUR (Turkey)		AFY (Turkey)		SAR (Sardinia)		GER (Germany)		FRA (France)		ESP (Spain)		TRE		PIE (Italy)		GAR (Italy)		LOM		CDM (Italy)		Points
1	KTM	3	2	1	3	2	1	1	1	1	1	1	3	1	1	1	2	1	2	1	1	1	3	2	1	2	1	1	1	3	1	3	4	2	1	1	1	842
2	Kawasaki	2	6	7	2	1	12	4	4	3	5	2	1	5	3	4	4	4	5	3	3	4	2	1	2	1	7	3	4	1	5	2	3	1	2	2	3	708
3	Honda	1	1	4	1	5	5	3	2	2	15	7	4	2	2	6	1	3	1	11	8	3	1	6	3	4	2	4	3	2	3	4	1	4	3	3	2	702
4	Yamaha	6	5	5	5	4	2	2	6	4	2	5	8	7	7	7	7	8	12	4	4	7	5	3	6	5	8	2	2	4	2	1	2	5	5	4	4	616
5	Gas Gas	Ret	3	6	6	7	4	7	5	18	6	4	2	6	5	3	12	5	6	5	6	6	4	4	5	6	5	6	12	11	8	22	Ret	12	8	10	5	486
6	Husqvarna	8	7	14	12	20	19	11	8	13	11	8	6	25	8	10	15	12	9	8	13	12	13	8	10	11	12	7	16	8	7	12	12	7	10	6	13	359
7	Beta	11	11	15	8	11	10	17	26	7	9	16	Ret	18	Ret	15	16	20	Ret	Ret	Ret	10	9	Ret	9	16	15	12	22	10	12	11	14	Ret	11	13	9	232
Pos	Bike	RUS (Russia)		GBR (United Kingdom)		ITA (Italy)		NED (Netherlands)		CZE (Czech Republic)		FLA (Flanders)		LAT (Latvia)		TUR (Turkey)		AFY (Turkey)		SAR (Sardinia)		GER (Germany)		FRA (France)		ESP (Spain)		TRE		PIE (Italy)		GAR (Italy)		LOM		CDM (Italy)		Points

== MX2 ==
=== Entry list ===
Officially Approved Teams & Riders
Team	Constructor	No	Rider	Rounds
F&H Racing Team	Kawasaki	11	(Denmark) Mikkel Haarup	All
F&H Racing Team	Kawasaki	39	(Netherlands) Roan van de Moosdijk	1–5, 10–13
F&H Racing Team	Kawasaki	172	(France) Mathys Boisramé	1–10
Rockstar Energy Husqvarna Factory Racing	Husqvarna	14	(Australia) Jed Beaton	All
Rockstar Energy Husqvarna Factory Racing	Husqvarna	74	(Netherlands) Kay de Wolf	All
Bike It MTX Kawasaki	Kawasaki	20	(Australia) Wilson Todd	All
Bike It MTX Kawasaki	Kawasaki	575	(United Kingdom) Taylor Hammal	2–4
Red Bull KTM Factory Racing	KTM	28	(France) Tom Vialle	1–3, 5–18
Red Bull KTM Factory Racing	KTM	711	(Austria) Rene Hofer	All
JK Racing	Yamaha	45	(Spain) Gerard Congost	2, 4–6, 8–9, 12–18
JK Racing	Yamaha	667	(Sweden) Anton Nordström Graaf	10
F&H Racing Shop	Kawasaki	46	(Netherlands) Davy Pootjes	
WZ Racing	KTM	51	(Spain) Oriol Oliver	13
WZ Racing	KTM	239	(Germany) Lion Florian	1–8
WZ Racing	KTM	403	(Denmark) Bastian Bøgh Damm	1–7, 10–18
WZ Racing	KTM	696	(Switzerland) Mike Gwerder	3, 14
Honda 114 Motorsports	Honda	70	(Spain) Rubén Fernández	1–10, 12–16
Honda 114 Motorsports	Honda	912	(United Kingdom) Joel Rizzi	1–7, 10–14, 17–18
SM Action GasGas Racing Team Yuasa Battery	Gas Gas	80	(Italy) Andrea Adamo	All
SM Action GasGas Racing Team Yuasa Battery	Gas Gas	240	(Norway) Kevin Horgmo	3, 5, 13
NR83 Team	KTM	83	(Belgium) Nathan Renkens	2, 5–6
NR83 Team	KTM	199	(Belgium) Florent Lambillon	11, 14–18
iXS MXGP Team	Yamaha	87	(Switzerland) Kevin Brumann	1–2, 4, 10–13
Jezyk Racing	KTM	88	(Spain) Sergi Notario	
Monster Energy Yamaha Factory MX2 Team	Yamaha	93	(Belgium) Jago Geerts	All
Monster Energy Yamaha Factory MX2 Team	Yamaha	198	(France) Thibault Benistant	1–16
Monster Energy Yamaha Factory MX2 Team	Yamaha	959	(France) Maxime Renaux	All
Team Beddini Racing KTM	KTM	94	(Italy) Gianluca Facchetti	8–16
Team Honda Racing Assomotor	Honda	94	(Italy) Gianluca Facchetti	2–6
Team Honda Racing Assomotor	Honda	118	(France) Stephen Rubini	1–6, 8–15
Team Honda Racing Assomotor	Honda	125	(Finland) Emil Weckman	3, 8–10
Team Honda Racing Assomotor	Honda	200	(Italy) Filippo Zonta	11–18
Hitachi KTM fuelled by Milwaukee	KTM	98	(Netherlands) Bas Vaessen	
Hitachi KTM fuelled by Milwaukee	KTM	115	(United Kingdom) Ashton Dickinson	2–5
Hitachi KTM fuelled by Milwaukee	KTM	426	(United Kingdom) Conrad Mewse	1–6, 10–18
JD Gunnex KTM Racing Team	KTM	99	(Czech Republic) Petr Rathouský	17–18
JD Gunnex KTM Racing Team	KTM	224	(Czech Republic) Jakub Terešák	1–3, 5–7
JD Gunnex KTM Racing Team	KTM	717	(Czech Republic) Jan Wagenknecht	8–9, 14–16
Red Bull KTM De Carli Factory Racing	KTM	101	(Italy) Mattia Guadagnini	All
Everest Racing	Husqvarna	181	(Belgium) Julian Vander Auwera	2–6, 8–9, 11–18
KTM Racestore MX2	KTM	253	(Slovenia) Jan Pancar	All
Hostettler Yamaha Racing	Yamaha	313	(Czech Republic) Petr Polák	All
Raths Motorsports	KTM	440	(Germany) Marnique Appelt	2–6, 10–12, 14, 16
Raths Motorsports	KTM	766	(Austria) Michael Sandner	1–5, 10–11, 14–16
KMP Honda Racing	Honda	491	(Germany) Paul Haberland	2, 4–6, 11, 14–18
DIGA-Procross Gas Gas Factory Racing	Gas Gas	516	(Germany) Simon Längenfelder	All
DIGA-Procross Gas Gas Factory Racing	Gas Gas	517	(Sweden) Isak Gifting	All
Wild Card Teams & Riders
Team	Constructor	No	Rider	Rounds
Marchetti Racing Team KTM	KTM	23	(Italy) Valerio Lata	8–9
Team VHR KTM Racing	KTM	27	(France) Tom Guyon	14
Moto-Cycle/Vega Solutions	KTM	48	(United Kingdom) Adam Collings	4, 6
KRTZ Motorsport	KTM	55	(Czech Republic) Adam Dušek	5
Team WID Motorsport	KTM	57	(France) Pierre Goupillon	3, 12, 15–16
Sixty-Two Motorsport	Husqvarna	69	(Sweden) Filip Olsson	10, 17–18
Team SE72 Yoko KTM	KTM	72	(Belgium) Liam Everts	10
MCV Motorsport ABF Italia Team	KTM	81	(Germany) Brian Hsu	14–18
Orion Racing Team	KTM	99	(Czech Republic) Petr Rathouský	5
MotorMix Racing Team	Gas Gas	111	(Italy) Alessandro Manucci	3
Team JCR	Yamaha	126	(Spain) Gonzalo Vargas	13
AIT Racing Team	KTM	164	(Bulgaria) Nikolay Malinov	10
Team EasyMX Racing	KTM	192	(Denmark) Glen Meier	4–6, 11–12, 14
Millionaire Racing Team	Husqvarna	223	(Italy) Giuseppe Tropepe	3, 5, 14–16
Steels Dr Jack Fly Over TM	TM	229	(Italy) Emilio Scuteri	10, 14–18
Becker Racing/Team Theiner	KTM	300	(Germany) Noah Ludwig	2, 4–6, 11
F4E Gas Gas Racing Team	Gas Gas	309	(Spain) Guillem Farrés	13
Tech32 Racing Team	Husqvarna	324	(France) Maxime Charlier	3
Nilsson Training Namura KTM	KTM	368	(Spain) Samuel Nilsson	13
Brouwer Motorsports GasGas	Gas Gas	411	(Netherlands) Kjeld Stuurman	10
Riley Racing Yamaha	Yamaha	427	(Norway) Håkon Fredriksen	14
Team AB Racing	Husqvarna	436	(Germany) Nico Greutmann	11
FRT Motorsport	Husqvarna	499	(Italy) Emanuele Alberio	15
	KTM	655	Daniil Balandin	1
	KTM	730	Timur Petrashin	1, 4–7, 11

==== Riders Championship ====
Pos	Nr	Rider	bike	RUS (Russia)		GBR (United Kingdom)		ITA (Italy)		NED (Netherlands)		CZE (Czech Republic)		FLA (Flanders)		LAT (Latvia)		TUR (Turkey)		AFY (Turkey)		SAR (Sardinia)		GER (Germany)		FRA (France)		ESP (Spain)		TRE		PIE (Italy)		GAR (Italy)		LOM		CDM (Italy)		Points
1	959	(France) Maxime Renaux	Yamaha	6	9	1	2	6	2	9	4	5	2	2	3	1	1	4	1	1	2	2	3	3	1	4	2	2	1	6	8	7	4	2	1	1	2	3	1	734
2	93	(Belgium) Jago Geerts	Yamaha	17	6	7	22	4	5	1	1	12	3	1	2	3	2	9	6	4	11	8	2	5	2	5	4	13	2	2	2	2	6	13	Ret	2	1	1	2	610
3	28	(France) Tom Vialle	KTM	1	1	DNS	DNS	Ret	DNS			2	Ret	4	11	6	4	1	2	2	1	1	1	1	3	1	1	1	3	1	1	1	Ret	4	2	3	4	Ret	DNS	570
4	101	(Italy) Mattia Guadagnini	KTM	9	10	4	1	2	1	14	5	1	5	14	11	2	3	2	4	3	6	3	Ret	13	10	2	3	3	8	18	7	11	2	Ret	9	12	5	5	3	548
5	14	(Australia) Jed Beaton	Husqvarna	7	11	Ret	8	5	7	2	3	3	8	8	5	4	13	3	3	12	3	13	5	4	5	3	6	4	4	7	3	16	3	5	14	5	3	7	8	540
6	711	(Austria) Rene Hofer	KTM	5	4	30	3	11	6	4	10	10	4	11	12	8	6	5	5	9	5	9	14	2	4	7	5	5	6	8	5	4	1	1	8	6	9	13	4	527
7	74	(Netherlands) Kay de Wolf	Husqvarna	10	21	15	15	7	9	5	2	6	9	3	1	9	8	7	9	7	8	4	4	8	6	19	11	6	18	5	6	8	12	8	6	4	10	2	6	478
8	198	(France) Thibault Benistant	Yamaha	15	7	5	9	1	14	13	6	9	1	5	4	5	7	8	10	6	4	5	8	16	9	6	7	9	7	Ret	17	15	9	6	7					413
9	70	(Spain) Rubén Fernández	Honda	2	3	2	6	3	12	10	7	4	7	6	7	17	5	6	DSQ	8	12	Ret	DNS			Ret	10	7	5	4	4	3	5	3	3					404
10	516	(Germany) Simon Längenfelder	Gas Gas	12	8	6	5	17	8	11	Ret	14	15	10	9	10	11	19	15	10	14	11	Ret	6	11	17	14	10	11	14	13	9	7	11	11	11	6	11	11	336
11	11	(Denmark) Mikkel Haarup	Kawasaki	13	17	9	31	20	11	8	9	16	16	9	14	7	9	17	8	15	18	15	Ret	12	8	12	8	15	9	12	14	10	10	14	5	10	8	4	7	326
12	20	(Australia) Wilson Todd	Kawasaki	16	14	10	11	15	18	6	12	7	11	Ret	23	19	12	11	7	5	9	7	15	29	7	8	15	11	10	17	Ret	6	11	7	4	8	17	10	Ret	316
13	517	(Sweden) Isak Gifting	Gas Gas	20	Ret	21	10	Ret	31	7	8	15	13	16	15	14	10	13	11	21	7	6	6	11	15	11	Ret	8	Ret	3	9	5	Ret	Ret	13	7	7	21	9	279
14	80	(Italy) Andrea Adamo	Gas Gas	14	13	18	13	13	10	15	18	13	Ret	18	18	12	14	15	14	11	10	20	13	14	14	13	12	16	Ret	11	12	Ret	8	10	10	9	14	9	10	259
15	172	(France) Mathys Boisramé	Kawasaki	4	2	3	7	8	4	12	11	11	6	7	8	11	15	10	20	13	17	14	Ret																	223
16	426	(United Kingdom) Conrad Mewse	KTM	DNS	DNS	17	14	10	15	19	13	Ret	10	Ret	6							10	9	7	12	21	19	12	13	10	18	Ret	20	9	17	14	16	6	5	203
17	39	(Netherlands) Roan van de Moosdijk	Kawasaki	3	5	8	4	9	3	3	Ret	8	Ret									12	7	10	Ret	9	9	29	DNS											190
18	118	(France) Stephen Rubini	Honda	11	Ret	Ret	12	12	19	20	DNS	29	20	20	Ret			12	13	14	13	Ret	DNS	9	13	10	13	14	12	9	11	Ret	DNS							142
19	403	(Denmark) Bastian Bøgh Damm	KTM	18	19	11	16	23	28	16	14	18	17	12	13	13	Ret					Ret	10	17	17	14	Ret	18	17	22	Ret	12	21	22	15	17	13	12	12	142
20	253	(Slovenia) Jan Pancar	KTM	8	12	20	18	16	13	25	Ret	20	22	22	19	18	17	16	12	16	16	17	12	23	18	18	Ret	20	15	30	26	18	22	20	16	16	11	15	14	136
21	313	(Czech Republic) Petr Polák	Yamaha	25	23	19	Ret	26	17	22	15	24	23	15	16	15	18	20	Ret	18	15	19	Ret	19	19	20	17	22	20	26	Ret	26	16	24	19	Ret	15	16	15	78
22	94	(Italy) Gianluca Facchetti	Honda			26	17	Ret	Ret	28	Ret	35	18	Ret	26																									63
22	94	(Italy) Gianluca Facchetti	KTM															14	16	17	Ret	25	Ret	20	16	15	20	19	14	19	Ret	13	13	DNS	DNS					63
23	81	(Germany) Brian Hsu	KTM																											21	16	22	17	12	12	13	12	8	16	62
24	229	(Italy) Emilio Scuteri	TM																			22	17							25	Ret	17	15	19	22	15	19	14	13	39
25	766	(Austria) Michael Sandner	KTM	24	25	13	DNS	Ret	22	26	Ret	17	Ret									Ret	21	18	22					24	19	23	14	15	18					33
26	192	(Denmark) Glen Meier	KTM							18	16	23	Ret	13	17									15	21	22	21			16	23									31
27	239	(Germany) Lion Florian	KTM	19	15	16	23	25	27	17	17	19	Ret	17	Ret	22	19	Ret	DNS																					29
28	240	(Norway) Kevin Horgmo	KTM					14	16			22	12															21	16											26
29	27	(France) Tom Guyon	KTM																											13	10									19
30	224	(Czech Republic) Jakub Terešák	KTM	22	16	22	21	21	20			21	19	21	21	16	16																							18
31	57	(France) Pierre Goupillon	KTM					19	21																	16	18					Ret	18	16	21					18
32	200	(Italy) Filippo Zonta	Honda																					21	23	Ret	22	24	23	29	27	20	26	17	23	18	18	17	20	16
33	72	(Belgium) Liam Everts	KTM																			16	11																	15
34	223	(Italy) Giuseppe Tropepe	Husqvarna					29	23			25	14																	Ret	Ret	14	Ret	Ret	DNS					14
35	87	(Switzerland) Kevin Brumann	Yamaha	Ret	18	Ret	DNS			DNS	DNS											21	16	24	20	25	16	DNS	DNS											14
36	427	(Norway) Håkon Fredriksen	Yamaha																											15	15									12
37	717	(Czech Republic) Jan Wagenknecht	KTM															22	18	19	19									23	21	19	19	23	20					12
38	115	(United Kingdom) Ashton Dickinson	KTM			14	19	Ret	24	23	19	27	Ret																											11
39	575	(United Kingdom) Taylor Hammal	Kawasaki			12	20	28	Ret	Ret	DNS																													10
40	69	(Sweden) Filip Olsson	Husqvarna																			18	18													19	24	Ret	DNS	8
41	45	(Spain) Gerard Congost	Yamaha			25	26			Ret	DSQ	36	21	27	28			23	19	Ret	DNS					23	23	25	25	28	22	21	25	18	24	23	23	22	19	7
42	912	(United Kingdom) Joel Rizzi	Honda	23	22	24	24	24	29	30	21	28	27	24	Ret	21	DNS					24	19	Ret	DNS	24	24	28	24	27	Ret					20	20	18	22	7
43	491	(Germany) Paul Haberland	Honda			29	28			31	23	33	Ret	28	Ret									27	Ret					Ret	28	Ret	23	21	25	22	21	19	17	6
44	309	(Spain) Guillem Farrés	Gas Gas																									17	19											6
45	23	(Italy) Valerio Lata	KTM															21	17	20	20																			6
46	125	(Finland) Emil Weckman	Honda					18	Ret									18	Ret	22	Ret	Ret	DNS																	6
47	99	(Czech Republic) Petr Rathouský	KTM									31	24																							21	22	20	18	4
48	730	Timur Petrashin	KTM	21	20					21	Ret	32	Ret	23	20	20	20							26	25															4
49	83	(Belgium) Nathan Renkens	KTM			23	30					26	Ret	19	22																									2
50	696	(Switzerland) Mike Gwerder	KTM					27	30																					20	20									2
51	300	(Germany) Noah Ludwig	KTM			27	27			24	20	30	25	25	25									Ret	DNS															1
52	667	(Sweden) Anton Nordström Graaf	Yamaha																			DNS	20																	1
	181	(Belgium) Julian Vander Auwera	Husqvarna			31	29	Ret	33	32	25	38	29	29	29			24	21	24	21			Ret	DNS	26	26	27	26	31	24	27	27	Ret	DNS	24	26	Ret	DNS	0
	199	(Belgium) Florent Lambillon	KTM																					28	27					32	25	25	28	26	27	25	25	23	21	0
	368	(Spain) Samuel Nilsson	KTM																									26	21											0
	440	(Germany) Marnique Appelt	KTM			28	25	30	32	27	22	37	28	Ret	24							23	Ret	22	26	Ret	25			Ret	Ret			25	26					0
	51	(Spain) Oriol Oliver	KTM																									23	22											0
	324	(France) Maxime Charlier	Husqvarna					22	26																															0
	164	(Bulgaria) Nikolay Malinov	KTM																			26	22																	0
	411	(Netherlands) Kjeld Stuurman	Gas Gas																			Ret	23																	0
	499	(Italy) Emanuele Alberio	Husqvarna																													24	24							0
	436	(Germany) Nico Greutmann	Husqvarna																					25	24															0
	48	(United Kingdom) Adam Collings	KTM							29	24			26	27																									0
	655	Daniil Balandin	KTM	26	24																																			0
	111	(Italy) Alessandro Manucci	Gas Gas					DSQ	25																															0
	55	(Czech Republic) Adam Dušek	KTM									34	26																											0
	126	(Spain) Gonzalo Vargas	Yamaha																									30	Ret											0
Pos	Nr	Rider	bike	RUS (Russia)		GBR (United Kingdom)		ITA (Italy)		NED (Netherlands)		CZE (Czech Republic)		FLA (Flanders)		LAT (Latvia)		TUR (Turkey)		AFY (Turkey)		SAR (Sardinia)		GER (Germany)		FRA (France)		ESP (Spain)		TRE		PIE (Italy)		GAR (Italy)		LOM		CDM (Italy)		Points

==== Manufacturers Championship ====
Pos	Bike	RUS (Russia)		GBR (United Kingdom)		ITA (Italy)		NED (Netherlands)		CZE (Czech Republic)		FLA (Flanders)		LAT (Latvia)		TUR (Turkey)		AFY (Turkey)		SAR (Sardinia)		GER (Germany)		FRA (France)		ESP (Spain)		TRE		PIE (Italy)		GAR (Italy)		LOM		CDM (Italy)		Points
1	Yamaha	6	6	1	2	1	2	1	1	5	1	1	2	1	1	4	1	1	2	2	2	3	1	4	2	2	1	2	2	2	4	2	1	1	1	1	1	809
2	KTM	1	1	4	1	2	1	4	5	1	4	4	6	2	3	1	2	2	1	1	1	1	3	1	1	1	3	1	1	1	1	1	2	3	4	5	3	797
3	Husqvarna	7	11	15	8	5	7	2	2	3	8	3	1	4	8	3	3	7	3	4	4	4	5	3	6	4	4	5	3	8	3	5	6	4	3	2	6	616
4	Kawasaki	3	2	3	4	8	3	3	9	7	6	7	8	7	9	10	7	5	9	7	7	10	7	8	8	11	9	12	14	6	10	7	4	8	8	4	7	513
5	Honda	2	3	2	6	3	12	10	7	4	7	6	7	17	5	6	13	8	12	24	19	9	13	10	10	7	5	4	4	3	5	3	3	18	18	17	17	459
6	Gas Gas	12	8	6	5	13	8	7	8	13	12	10	9	10	10	13	11	10	7	6	6	6	11	11	12	8	11	3	9	5	7	10	10	7	6	9	9	440
7	TM																			22	17							25	Ret	17	15	19	22	15	19	14	13	39
Pos	Bike	RUS (Russia)		GBR (United Kingdom)		ITA (Italy)		NED (Netherlands)		CZE (Czech Republic)		FLA (Flanders)		LAT (Latvia)		TUR (Turkey)		AFY (Turkey)		SAR (Sardinia)		GER (Germany)		FRA (France)		ESP (Spain)		TRE		PIE (Italy)		GAR (Italy)		LOM		CDM (Italy)		Points

== See also ==
- 2021 FIM Women's Motocross World Championship
- 2021 Motocross des Nations
- 2021 European Motocross Championship
