= Triple Crown Series =

Canadian Motocross Championship

- Triple Crown Series logo
- Category: Motocross
- Country: Canada
- Inaugural season: 2018

The Triple Crown Series is the premier domestic Canadian off-road motorcycle racing series, sanctioned by Motorsport Racing Canada.

The series currently runs annually throughout the summer months each year although has previously spanned a wider duration when Supercross and Arenacross rounds were included. The premier classes are the 450 Pro and 250 Pro but there are also classes for women riders and two-stroke motorcycles.

From the 2025 season, the overall Triple Crown Series title switched from being for individual riders to teams, in a new format. Taking place across the motocross season only, teams pick two riders to score points for them, with the championship split into three stages.

The Triple Crown Series took over as the premier off-road series in Canada in 2018, when promoter Jetwerx acquired the Canadian Motorsport Racing Club and renamed it Motorsport Racing Canada (MRC). Prior to this, the highest level of motocross racing in Canada had gone through several guises from its inception in the 1950s and had been known as the Canadian Motocross Nationals in the period prior to Jetwerx's acquisition.

== History ==
The sport of motocross has a long history in Canada, with the first organised national championship happening in 1958. In the 1960s and 70's, European, American and Japanese riders competed in the national championships in Canada, raising the level of the series and the profile of the sport nationally.

By the 1990s the Continental Motosport Club begun sanctioning events in competition with the Canadian Motorcycle Association. Renamed to be the Canadian Motosport Racing Club, the company became the promoter of the Canadian Motocross Nationals up until the end of the 2017 season.

Following Jetwerx's acquisition and renaming of the CMRC to Motorsport Racing Canada, the series was transformed into the Triple Crown Series for 2018 onwards. This saw the creation of a 'Grand National' style overall Triple Crown championship, encompassing points totalled from the separate national Motocross, Supercross & Arenacross championships in the country. Within this, the winner of each of the three separate championships became the national champion in that discipline.

The 2020 and 2021 season saw no Arenacross rounds held and from 2022 onwards there have been no Supercross rounds held. Arenacross returned in 2022 and 2023 but the 2024 season saw the Triple Crown Series contested over the Motocross rounds only.

Dylan Wright is the most successful rider in the championship since 2018, winning 4 overall Triple Crown titles across the two main classes.

== Event Format ==
All rounds of the Triple Crown Series typically have a single day format, whether that be a motocross, supercross or arenacross event.

At an MX Tour event, the two main classes have a 12-minute free practice session, followed by a 15-minute qualifying session. The 250 Pro class then has two 25 minute + 2 lap main races whilst the 450 class has two 30 minute + 2 lap races.

Points are awarded to finishers of the main races in the MX Tour, in the following format:

Position	1st	2nd	3rd	4th	5th	6th	7th	8th	9th	10th	11th	12th	13th	14th	15th	16th	17th	18th	19th	20th
Points	25	22	20	18	16	15	14	13	12	11	10	9	8	7	6	5	4	3	2	1

Both the AX Tour and SX Tour start with a 7-8 minute practice and qualifying session, followed by 8 lap Heat Races. Both tours then hold A Mains followed by a Superfinal.

Points are awarded to finishers of the A Mains in the AX Tour, in the following format:

Position	1st	2nd	3rd	4th	5th	6th	7th	8th	9th	10th
Points	25	22	20	18	16	15	14	13	12	11

Points are awarded to finishers of the A Mains in the SX Tour, in the following format:

Position	1st	2nd	3rd	4th	5th	6th	7th	8th	9th	10th	11th	12th	13th	14th	15th
Points	25	22	20	18	16	15	14	13	12	11	10	9	8	7	6

== Broadcast ==
Each round of the Triple Crown Series is streamed on RydeTV and broadcast on the Fox Sports Racing cable network.

== List of Champions ==
=== Overall Champions ===
Season	Team Champions	
2026	Honda Canada GDR Fox Racing	
2025	MX101 FXR Yamaha	
	450 Pro Champion	250 Pro Champion
2024	(Canada) Jess Pettis (KTM)	(Canada) Kaven Benoit (KTM)
2023	(Canada) Dylan Wright (Honda)	(Canada) Ryder McNabb (KTM)
2022	(Canada) Dylan Wright (Honda)	(United States) Mitchell Harrison (Gas Gas)
2021	(Canada) Cole Thompson (KTM)	(United States) Darian Sanayei (Kawasaki)
2020	(Canada) Dylan Wright (Honda)	(United States) Marshal Weltin (Kawasaki)
2019	(United States) Phil Nicoletti (Yamaha)	(Canada) Dylan Wright (Honda)
2018	(Canada) Cole Thompson (KTM)	(Canada) Jess Pettis (Yamaha)

=== MX Tour Champions ===
Season	450 Pro Champion	250 Pro Champion
2026	(Canada) Dylan Wright (Honda)	(Canada) Dylan Rempel (Honda)
2025	(United States) Phil Nicoletti (Kawasaki)	(United States) Preston Kilroy (Yamaha)
2024	(Canada) Jess Pettis (KTM)	(Canada) Kaven Benoit (KTM)
2023	(Canada) Dylan Wright (Honda)	(Canada) Ryder McNabb (KTM)
2022	(Canada) Dylan Wright (Honda)	(Canada) Ryder McNabb (Honda)
2021	(Canada) Dylan Wright (Honda)	(Canada) Jake Piccolo (KTM)
2020	(Canada) Dylan Wright (Honda)	(Canada) Jess Pettis (KTM)
2019	(Canada) Colton Facciotti (Honda)	(Canada) Dylan Wright (Honda)
2018	(Canada) Colton Facciotti (Honda)	(Canada) Jess Pettis (Yamaha)

=== AX Tour Champions ===
Season	450 Pro Champion	250 Pro Champion
2023	(United States) Mitchell Harrison (Gas Gas)	(United States) Mitchell Harrison (Gas Gas)
2022	(United States) Mitchell Harrison (Gas Gas)	(United States) Mitchell Harrison (Gas Gas)
2019	(Canada) Cole Thompson (KTM)	(Canada) Dylan Wright (Honda)
2018	(Canada) Cole Thompson (KTM)	(Canada) Shawn Maffenbeier (Kawasaki)

=== SX Tour Champions ===
Season	450 Pro Champion	250 Pro Champion
2021	(Canada) Cole Thompson (KTM)	(United States) Darian Sanayei (Kawasaki)
2020	(Canada) Cole Thompson (KTM)	(United States) Marshal Weltin (Kawasaki)
2019	(United States) Phil Nicoletti (Yamaha)	(United States) Luke Renzland (Yamaha)
2018	(Canada) Cole Thompson (KTM)	(Canada) Jess Pettis (Yamaha)
