= Tom Vialle =

French motorcycle racer

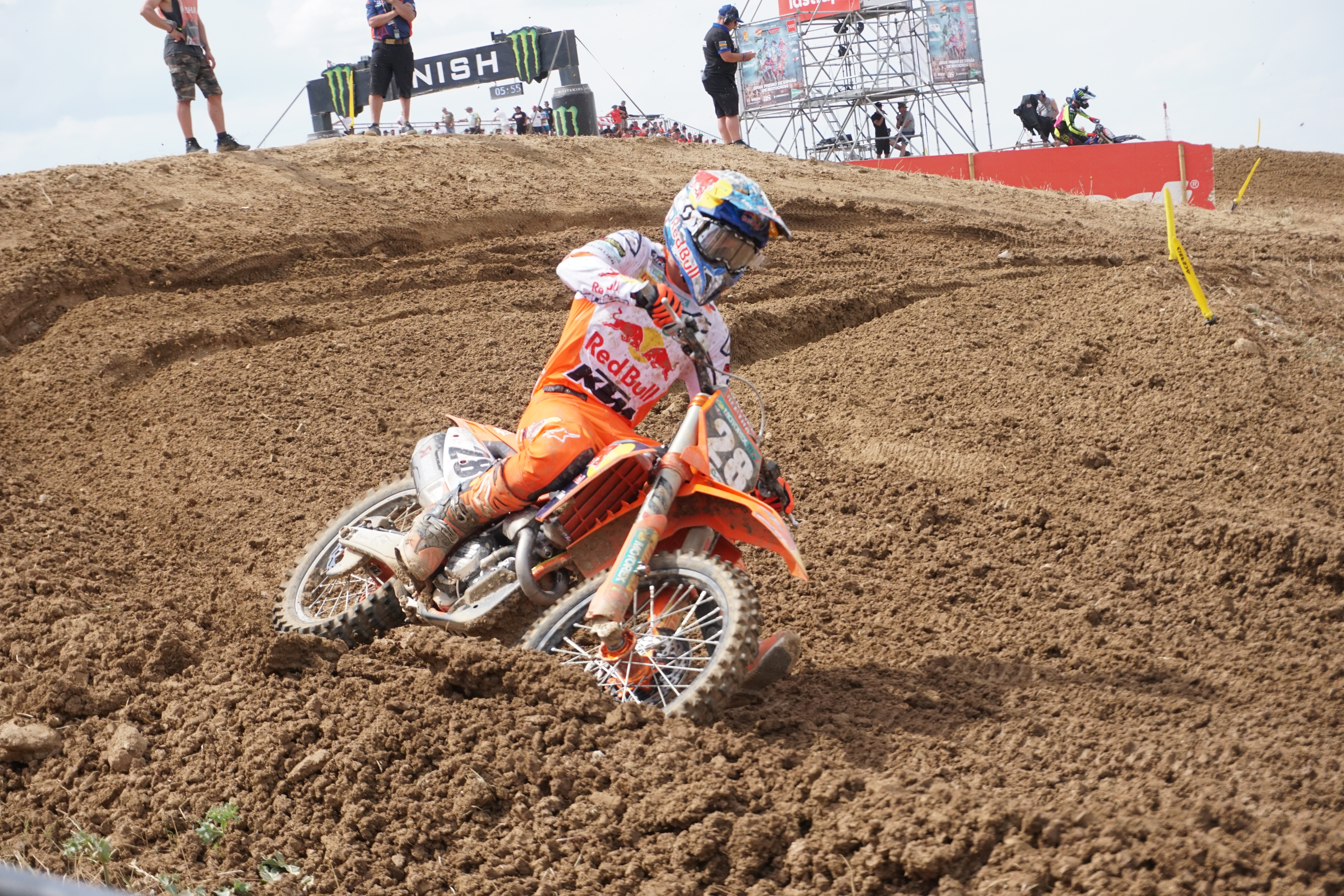
- Vialle in 2022
- Nationality: French
- Born: 28 October 2000 (age 26) Avignon, France

Motocross career
- Years active: 2019-Present
- Teams: •Red Bull Factory KTM Racing Team (2019-2025); •HRC Honda (2025-Present)
- Championships: •2020 MX2; •2022 MX2; •2024 AMA Supercross 250cc East; •2025 AMA Supercross 250cc East
- Wins: •AMA 250cc Motocross: 2; •AMA 250cc Supercross: 3; •MX2: 24; •MXGP: 1

Tom Vialle (born 28 October 2000) is a French professional motocross racer. He competed in the Motocross World Championships from 2019 to 2022 and again from 2026, & the AMA Supercross/Motocross Championships from 2023 to 2025. He is a two-time MX2 Motocross World Champion & a two-time AMA Supercross 250cc East Champion, and in 2026 he was awarded the MXGP Fox Holeshot Award.

== Motocross Career ==
=== 2020 ===
Vialle won his first MX2 World Championship with seven Grand Prix wins as well as 14 out of 18 podium finishes.

=== 2022 ===
In 2022, Vialle would capture his second MX2 World Championship at the very last round in Turkey, Afyonkarahisar, by four points against championship rival Jago Geerts.

Vialle also won ten Grand Prix’s as well as finishing on the podium 15 out of 18 times.

=== 2023 ===
For the 2023 season and beyond, Vialle has transitioned into racing the AMA Supercross and AMA Motocross championships, in the 250cc (4 stroke) category.

Supercross

In Supercross, Vialle finished eighth in the final point standings for the East series, with a best result of fourth.

Motocross

In his AMA Motocross 250cc debut at Fox raceway, Vialle placed 7-3 for a fourth overall. His first win would arise at the Southwick national, with a 1-3 overall score for first. He ended the nationals with a third place finish at Ironman and a sixth place finish in the championship standings.

SuperMotocross

Vialle placed second in the inaugural 250cc SMX opening round.

=== 2024 ===
Supercross

In his second year, Vialle captured the 2024 250SX East Championship. After a rough first round, he podiumed his first race then claimed consecutive wins at Daytona & Birmingham. He ended the season with seven podiums & a four point lead over his adversary.

=== 2025 ===
Supercross

Vialle successfully defended his 250SX East Championship by three points at Round 17.

== AMA Supercross/Motocross Results ==
Year	Rnd 1	Rnd 2	Rnd 3	Rnd 4	Rnd 5	Rnd 6	Rnd 7	Rnd 8	Rnd 9	Rnd 10	Rnd 11	Rnd 12	Rnd 13	Rnd 14	Rnd 15	Rnd 16	Rnd 17	Average Finish	Podium Percent	Place
2023 250 SX-E	-	-	-	-	7	6	4	DNF	8	6	-	-	DNF	14	7	-	14	9.42	-	8th
2023 250 MX	4	4	DNF	5	4	1	6	DNF	6	5	3	-	-	-	-	-	-	4.22	22%	6th
2024 250 SX-E	-	-	-	-	18	-	3	1	1	2	-	-	3	3	2	-	8	4.56	78%	1st
2024 250 MX	3	2	3	5	2	4	7	2	11	2	1	-	-	-	-	-	-	3.82	64%	2nd
2025 250 SX-E	-	-	-	-	5	4	-	2	2	3	-	22	6	3	1	-	3	5.10	60%	1st
2025 250 MX	3	17	5	2	2	13	14	OUT	3	3	17	-	-	-	-	-	-	7.90	50%	5th

== MXGP Career Results ==
Year	Rnd 1	Rnd 2	Rnd 3	Rnd 4	Rnd 5	Rnd 6	Rnd 7	Rnd 8	Rnd 9	Rnd 10	Rnd 11	Rnd 12	Rnd 13	Rnd 14	Rnd 15	Rnd 16	Rnd 17	Rnd 18	Rnd 19	Rnd 20	Average Finish	Podium Percent	Place
2019 MX2	7	3	10	3	7	10	9	4	7	2	2	2	15	4	OUT	1	5	2	-	-	5.47	41%	4th
2020 MX2	2	1	1	4	2	3	1	1	6	2	2	1	1	1	6	3	8	2	-	-	2.61	78%	1st
2021 MX2	1	OUT	DNF	OUT	11	7	4	1	1	1	2	1	2	1	9	2	3	DNF	-	-	3.29	71%	3rd
2022 MX2	2	11	1	1	1	3	2	1	1	1	9	1	5	3	2	1	1	1	-	-	2.61	83%	1st
2026 MXGP	3 ARG (Argentina)	6 AND (Andalusia)	1 SUI (Switzerland)	7 SAR (Sardinia)	3 TRE	16 FRA (France)	OUT GER (Germany)	OUT LAT (Latvia)	7 ITA (Italy)	12 POR (Portugal)	12 RSA (South Africa)	10 GBR (United Kingdom)	2 CZE (Czech Republic)	4 FLA (Flanders)	3 SWE (Sweden)	3 NED (Netherlands)	2 TUR (Turkey)	3 CHN (China)	3 AUS (Australia)	-	5.64	53%	4th
