= 2022 FIM Motocross World Championship =

Champions of the world motocross 2022

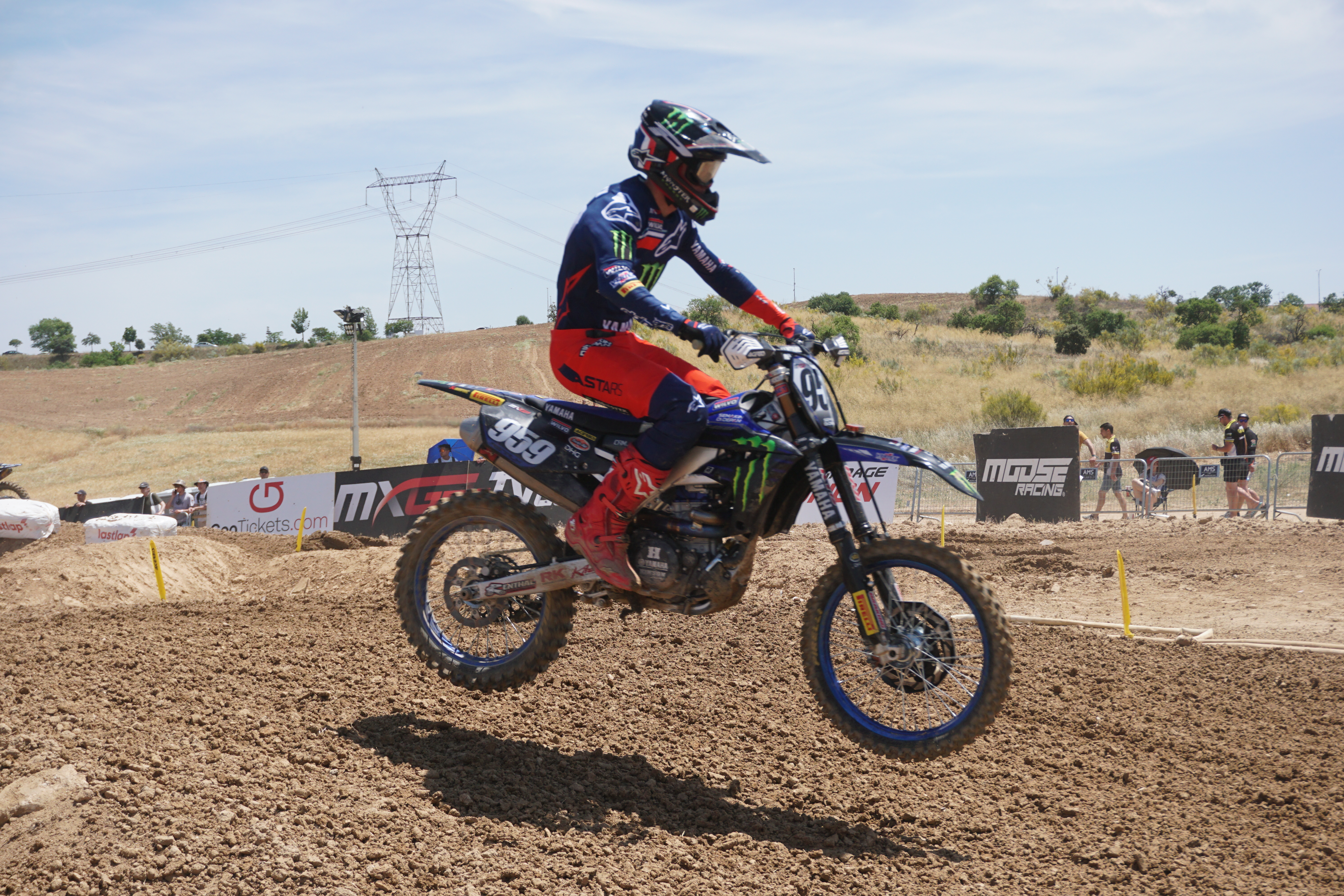
Maxime Renaux in 2022

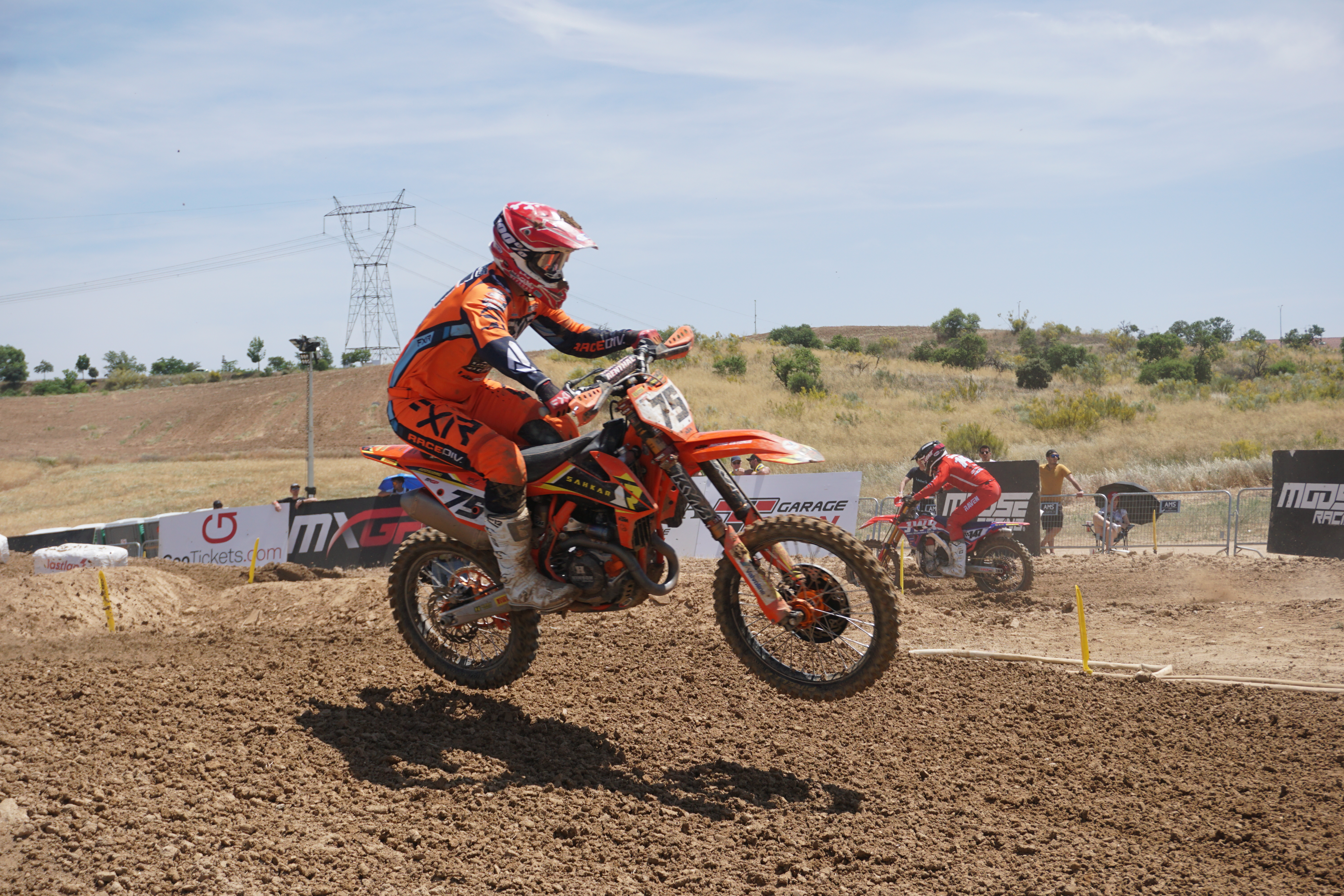
Hardi Roosiorg in 2022

The 2022 FIM Motocross World Championship was the 66th FIM Motocross World Championship season.

In the MXGP class, Jeffrey Herlings started the season as the reigning champion after picking up his fifth world title in 2021. The reigning MX2 world champion, Maxime Renaux did not defend his title as he moved into the MXGP category after he picked up his maiden world title in the previous year.

== Race calendar and results ==
The championship was contested over eighteen rounds in Europe, Asia and South America.

=== MXGP ===
Round	Date	Grand Prix	Location	Race 1 Winner	Race 2 Winner	Round Winner	Report
1	27 February	(United Kingdom) MXGP of Great Britain	Matterley Basin	(Slovenia) Tim Gajser	(Spain) Jorge Prado	(Slovenia) Tim Gajser	
2	6 March	(Lombardy) MXGP of Lombardia	Mantova	(Spain) Jorge Prado	(Slovenia) Tim Gajser	(Slovenia) Tim Gajser	
3	20 March	MXGP of Argentina	Villa La Angostura	(France) Maxime Renaux	(Slovenia) Tim Gajser	(Slovenia) Tim Gajser	
4	3 April	MXGP of Portugal	Águeda	(Spain) Jorge Prado	(Slovenia) Tim Gajser	(Spain) Jorge Prado	
5	10 April	MXGP of Trentino	Pietramurata	(Slovenia) Tim Gajser	(Slovenia) Tim Gajser	(Slovenia) Tim Gajser	
6	24 April	MXGP of Latvia	Ķegums	(Slovenia) Tim Gajser	(Slovenia) Tim Gajser	(Slovenia) Tim Gajser	
7	8 May	MXGP of Italy	Maggiora	(Slovenia) Tim Gajser	(Slovenia) Tim Gajser	(Slovenia) Tim Gajser	
8	15 May	(Sardinia) MXGP of Sardegna	Riola Sardo	(Netherlands) Calvin Vlaanderen	(Netherlands) Calvin Vlaanderen	(Netherlands) Calvin Vlaanderen	
9	29 May	MXGP of Spain	intu Xanadú	(France) Maxime Renaux	(France) Maxime Renaux	(France) Maxime Renaux	
10	5 June	MXGP of France	Ernée	(Switzerland) Jeremy Seewer	(Netherlands) Glenn Coldenhoff	(Switzerland) Jeremy Seewer	
11	12 June	MXGP of Germany	Teutschenthal	(Slovenia) Tim Gajser	(Switzerland) Jeremy Seewer	(Slovenia) Tim Gajser	
12	26 June	MXGP of Indonesia	Samota-Sumbawa	(Slovenia) Tim Gajser	(Slovenia) Tim Gajser	(Slovenia) Tim Gajser	
13	17 July	MXGP of Czech Republic	Loket	(Switzerland) Jeremy Seewer	(France) Maxime Renaux	(Switzerland) Jeremy Seewer	
14	24 July	MXGP of Flanders	Lommel	(Netherlands) Brian Bogers	(Netherlands) Glenn Coldenhoff	(Netherlands) Brian Bogers	
15	7 August	MXGP of Sweden	Uddevalla	(France) Maxime Renaux	(Switzerland) Jeremy Seewer	(Switzerland) Jeremy Seewer	
16	14 August	MXGP of Finland	Hyvinkää	(Netherlands) Brian Bogers	(Netherlands) Glenn Coldenhoff	(Netherlands) Glenn Coldenhoff	
17	21 August	MXGP of Charente-Maritime	Saint-Jean-d'Angély	(Switzerland) Jeremy Seewer	(Slovenia) Tim Gajser	(Slovenia) Tim Gajser	
18	4 September	MXGP of Turkey	Afyonkarahisar	(France) Maxime Renaux	(France) Romain Febvre	(Slovenia) Tim Gajser	

=== MX2 ===
Round	Date	Grand Prix	Location	Race 1 Winner	Race 2 Winner	Round Winner	Report
1	27 February	(United Kingdom) MXGP of Great Britain	Matterley Basin	(Germany) Simon Längenfelder	(Germany) Simon Längenfelder	(Germany) Simon Längenfelder	
2	6 March	(Lombardy) MXGP of Lombardia	Mantova	(Belgium) Jago Geerts	(Belgium) Jago Geerts	(Belgium) Jago Geerts	
3	20 March	MXGP of Argentina	Villa La Angostura	(Belgium) Jago Geerts	(France) Tom Vialle	(France) Tom Vialle	
4	3 April	MXGP of Portugal	Águeda	(France) Tom Vialle	(Belgium) Jago Geerts	(France) Tom Vialle	
5	10 April	MXGP of Trentino	Pietramurata	(France) Tom Vialle	(France) Tom Vialle	(France) Tom Vialle	
6	24 April	MXGP of Latvia	Ķegums	(Belgium) Jago Geerts	(Belgium) Jago Geerts	(Belgium) Jago Geerts	
7	8 May	MXGP of Italy	Maggiora	(Belgium) Jago Geerts	(France) Tom Vialle	(Belgium) Jago Geerts	
8	15 May	(Sardinia) MXGP of Sardegna	Riola Sardo	(Belgium) Jago Geerts	(France) Tom Vialle	(France) Tom Vialle	
9	29 May	MXGP of Spain	intu Xanadú	(France) Tom Vialle	(France) Tom Vialle	(France) Tom Vialle	
10	5 June	MXGP of France	Ernée	(France) Tom Vialle	(France) Thibault Benistant	(France) Tom Vialle	
11	12 June	MXGP of Germany	Teutschenthal	(France) Tom Vialle	(France) Thibault Benistant	(France) Thibault Benistant	
12	26 June	MXGP of Indonesia	Samota-Sumbawa	(France) Tom Vialle	(France) Tom Vialle	(France) Tom Vialle	
13	17 July	MXGP of Czech Republic	Loket	(France) Thibault Benistant	(Belgium) Jago Geerts	(Belgium) Jago Geerts	
14	24 July	MXGP of Flanders	Lommel	(Netherlands) Kay de Wolf	(Belgium) Jago Geerts	(Belgium) Jago Geerts	
15	7 August	MXGP of Sweden	Uddevalla	(France) Tom Vialle	(Belgium) Jago Geerts	(Belgium) Jago Geerts	
16	14 August	MXGP of Finland	Hyvinkää	(Belgium) Jago Geerts	(France) Tom Vialle	(France) Tom Vialle	
17	21 August	MXGP of Charente-Maritime	Saint-Jean-d'Angély	(France) Thibault Benistant	(France) Tom Vialle	(France) Tom Vialle	
18	4 September	MXGP of Turkey	Afyonkarahisar	(France) Tom Vialle	(France) Tom Vialle	(France) Tom Vialle	

=== Grand Prix locations ===
Location of non-European Grands Prix in 2022.
Location of European Grands Prix in 2022.

== MXGP ==
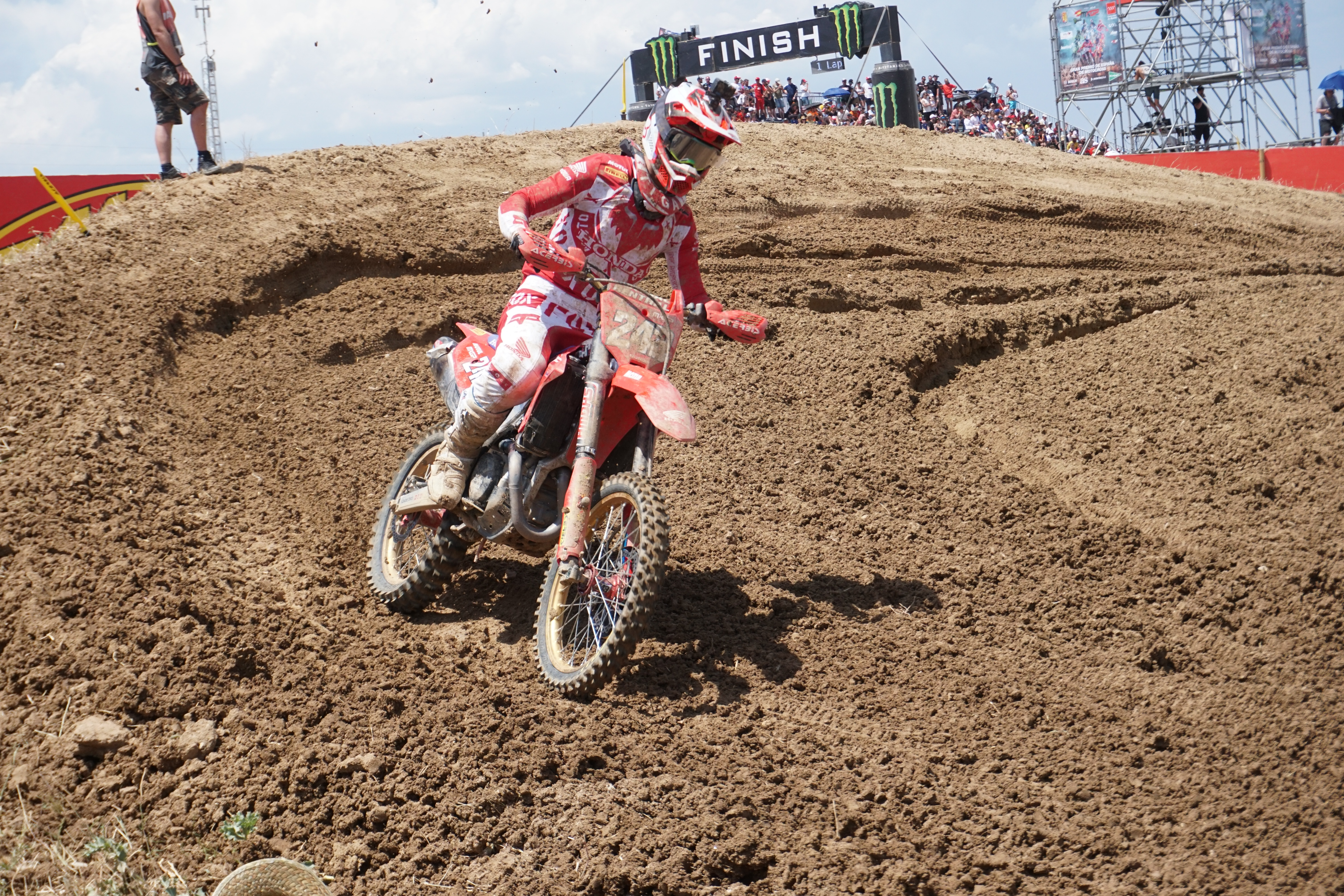
Tim Gajser Spain 2022

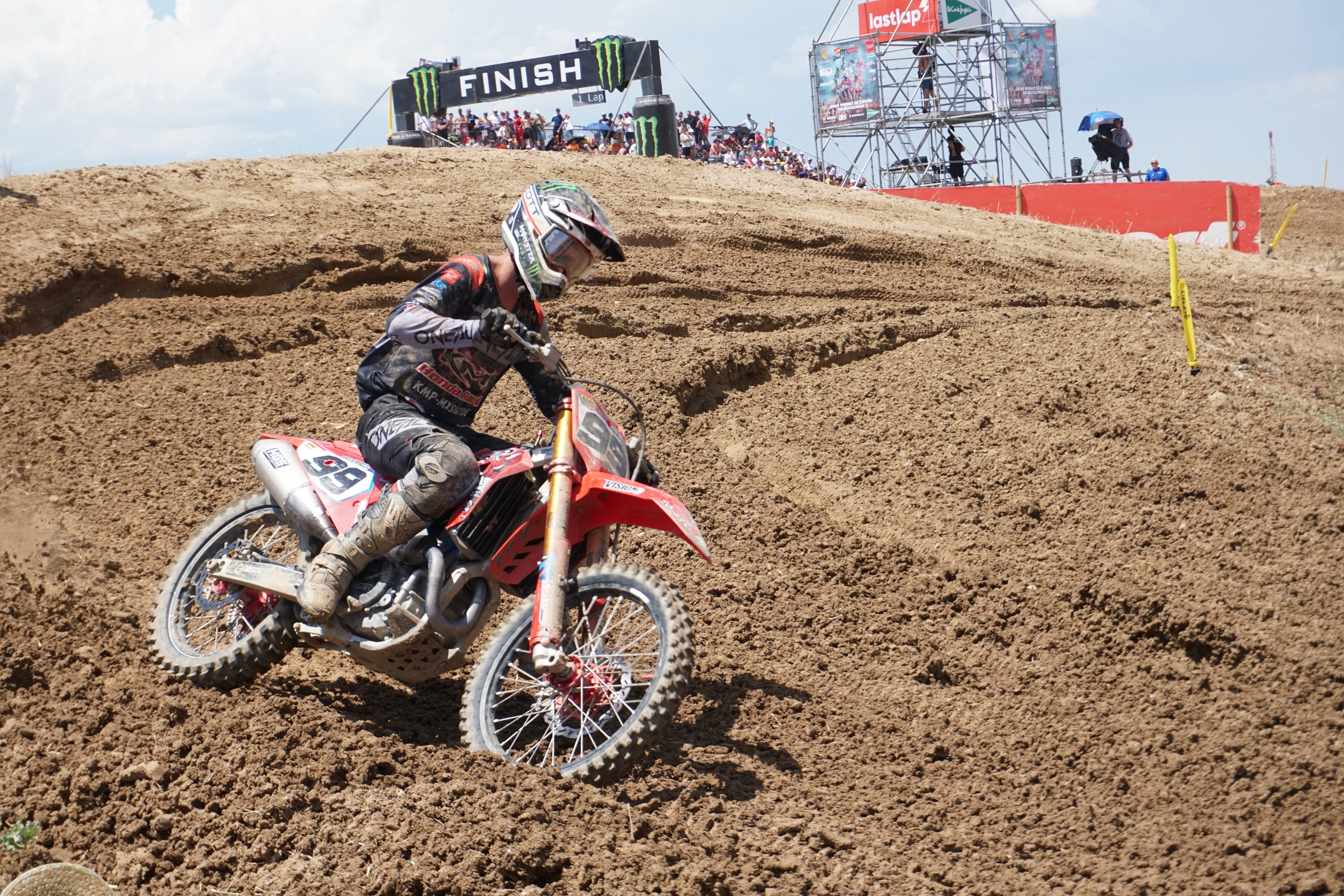
Jorge Zaragoza Spain 2022

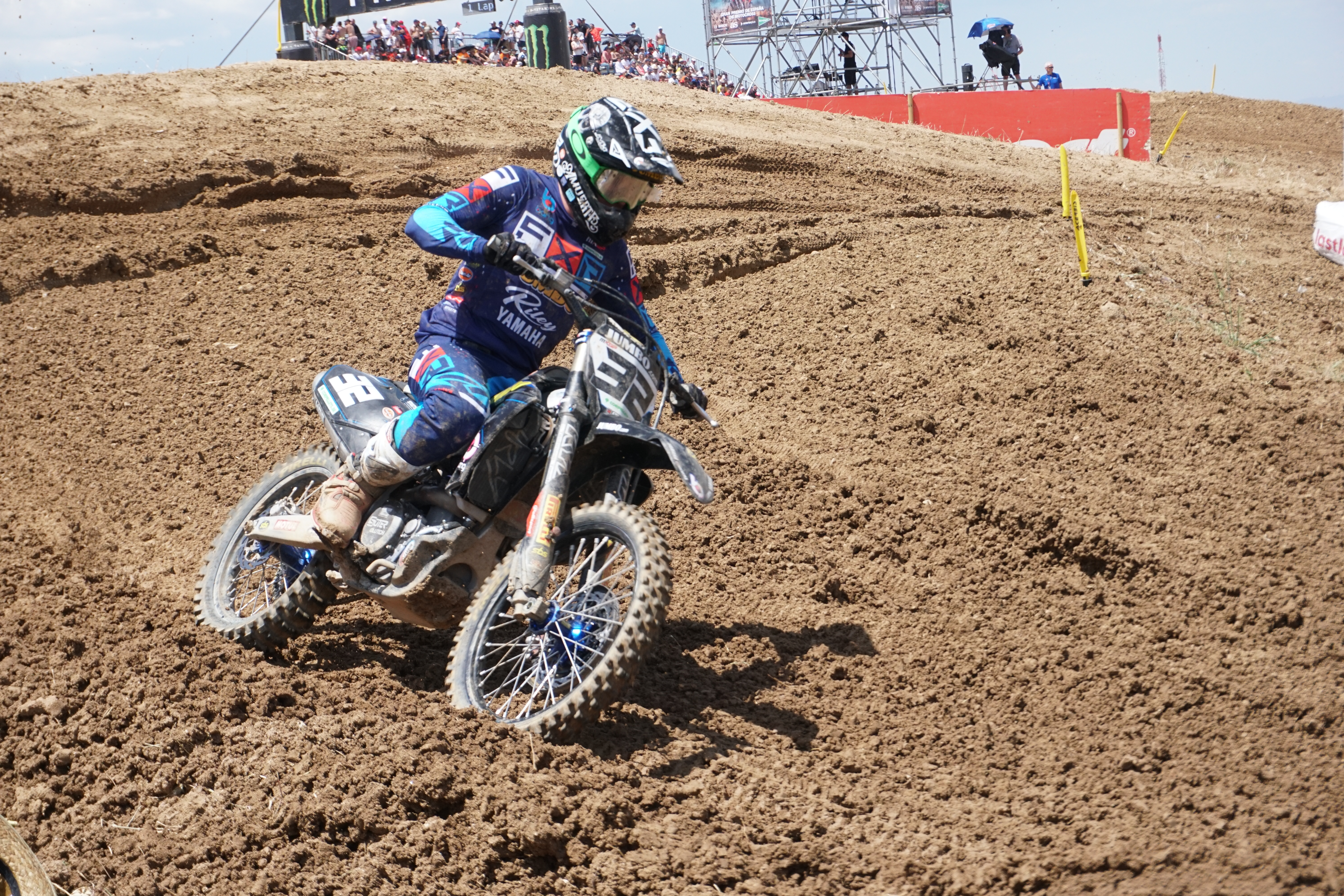
Brent Van Doninck Spain 2022

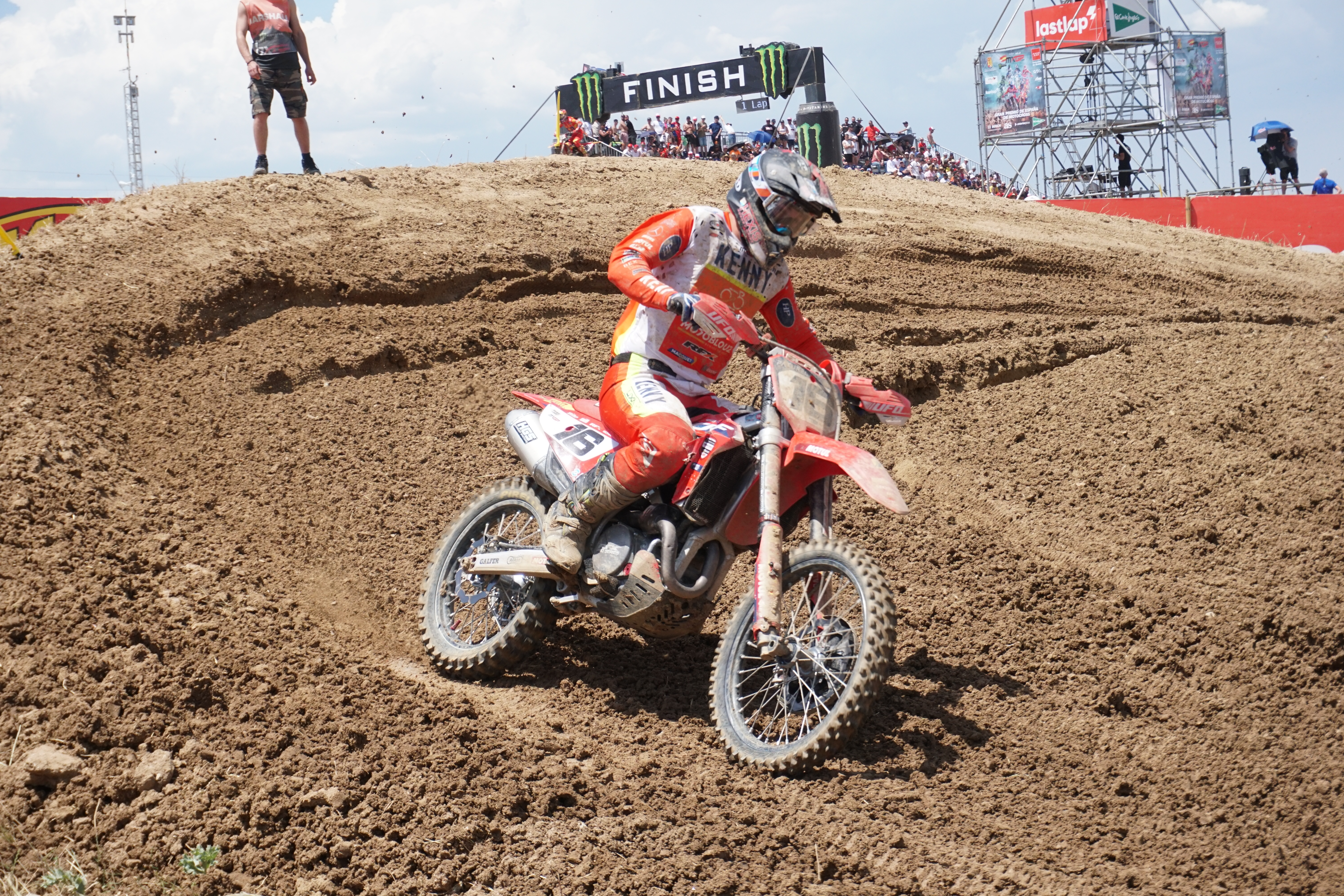
Benoît Paturel Spain 2022

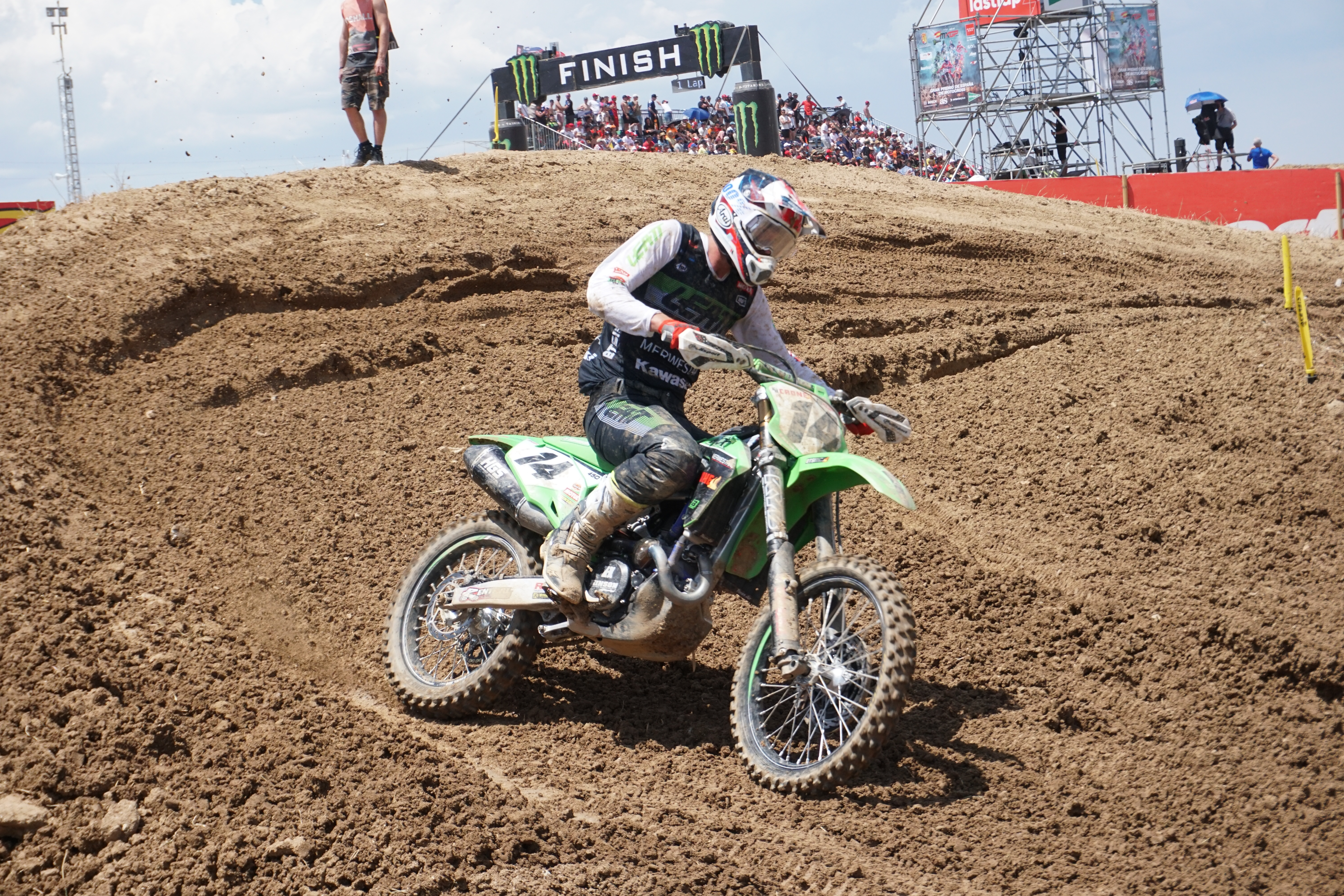
Jed Beaton Spain 2022

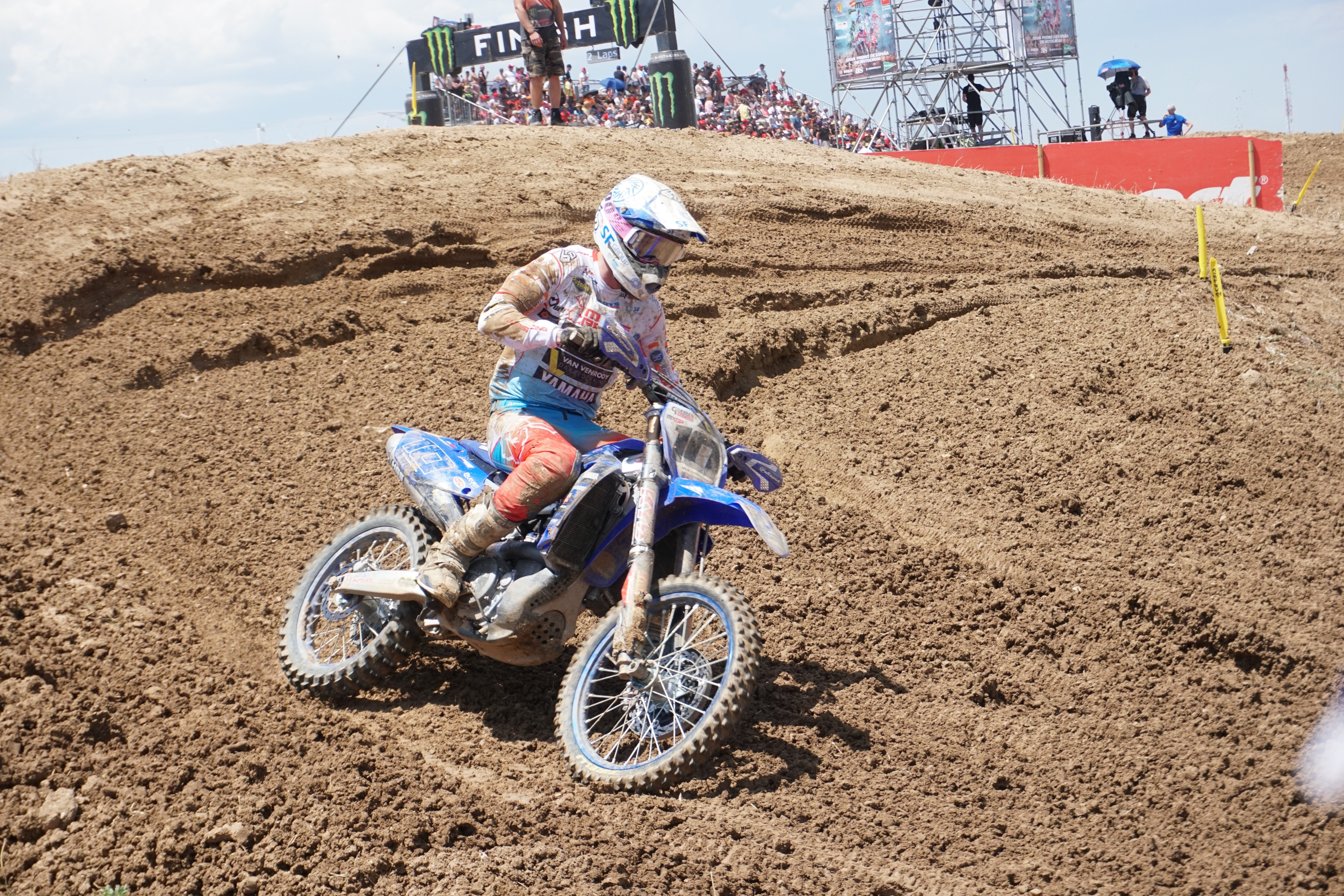
Calvin Vlaanderen Spain 2022

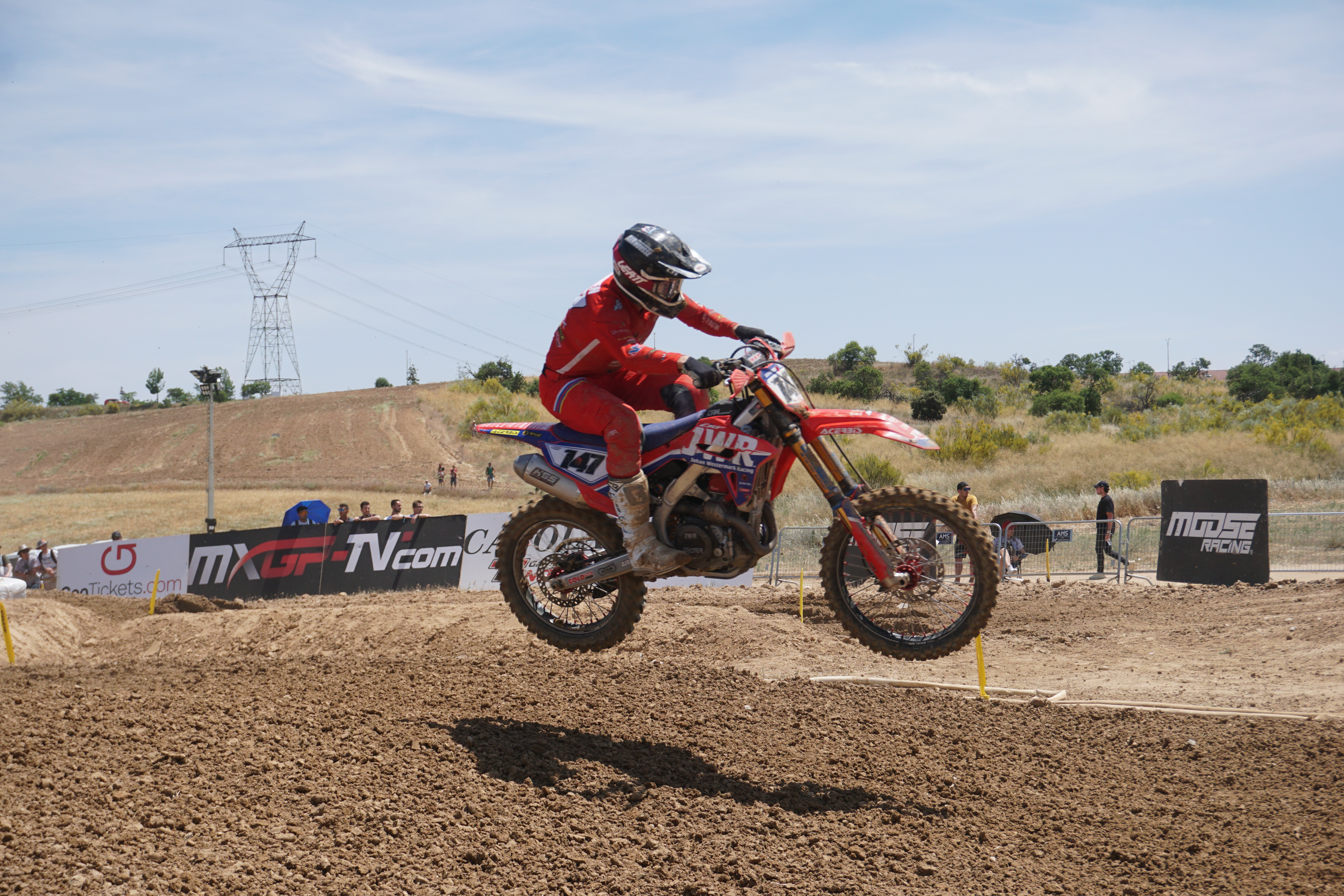
Miro Sihvonen Spain 2022

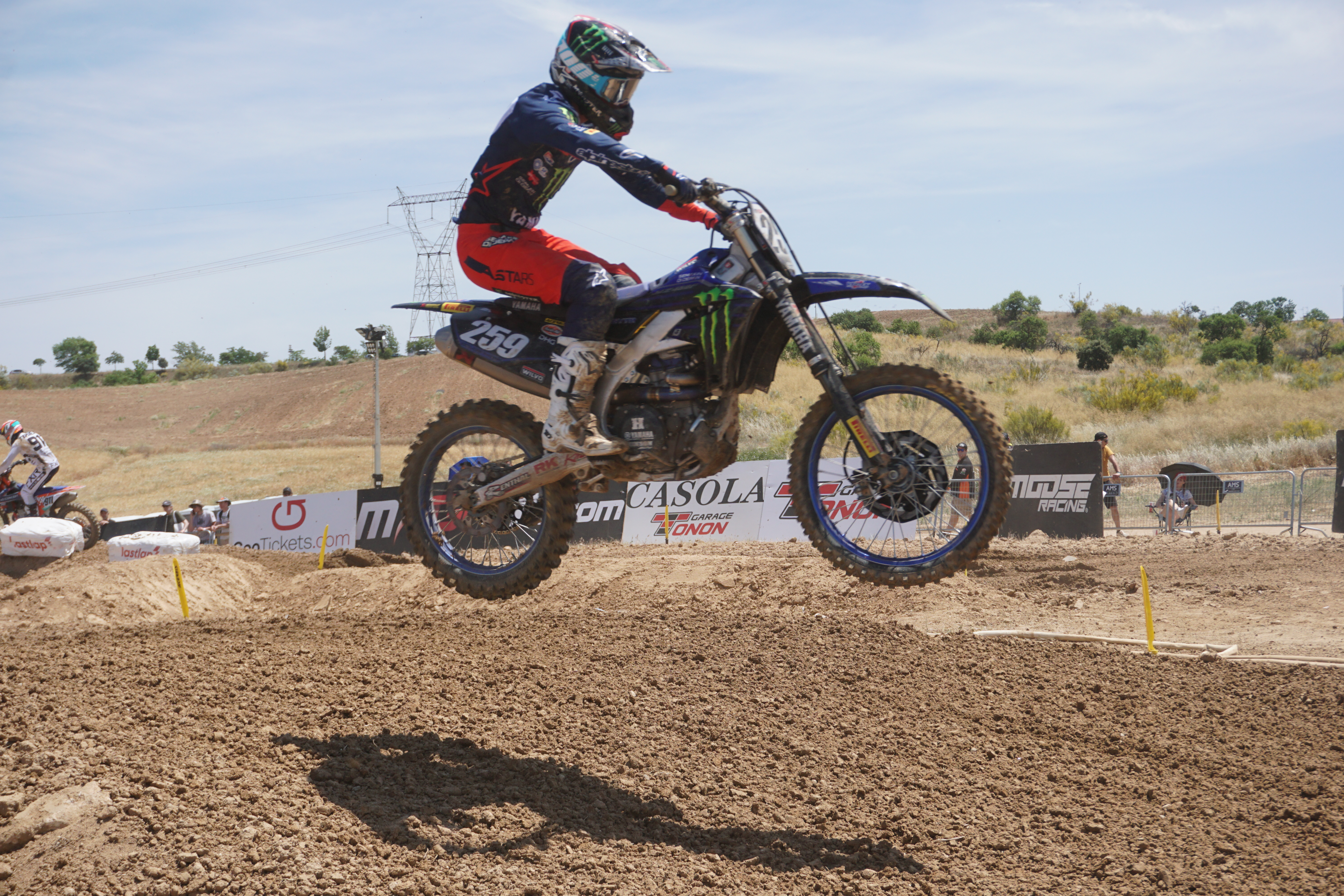
Glenn Coldenhoff Spain 2022

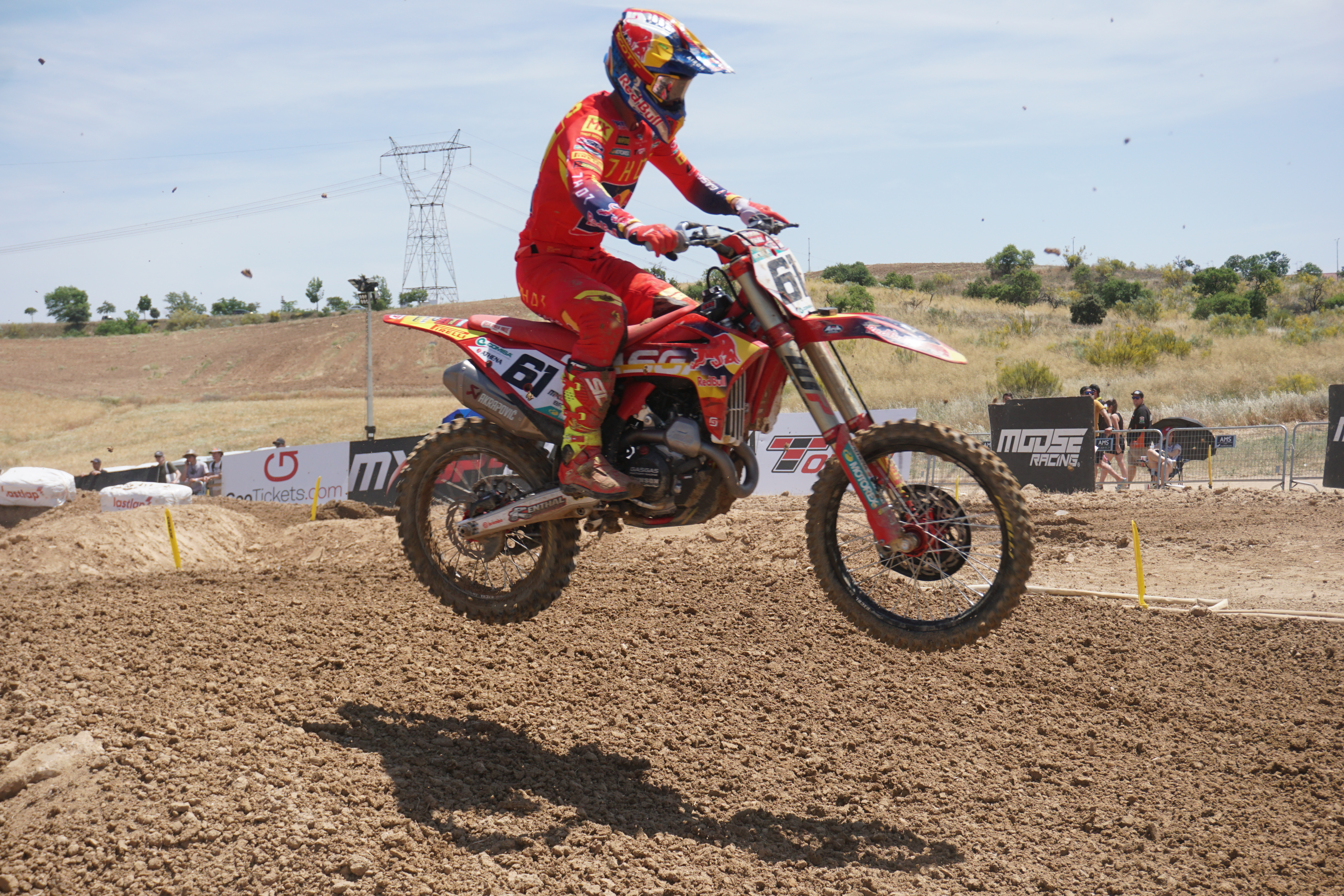
Jorge Prado Spain 2022

=== Entry list ===
Officially Approved Teams & Riders
Team	Constructor	No	Rider	Rounds
Red Bull KTM Factory Racing	KTM	1	(Netherlands) Jeffrey Herlings	
Red Bull KTM Factory Racing	KTM	172	(France) Mathys Boisramé	1
Kawasaki Racing Team MXGP	Kawasaki	3	(France) Romain Febvre	11–18
Kawasaki Racing Team MXGP	Kawasaki	919	(United Kingdom) Ben Watson	All
Gebben Van Venrooy Yamaha Racing	Yamaha	7	(Lithuania) Arminas Jasikonis	1–2, 8–9
Gebben Van Venrooy Yamaha Racing	Yamaha	10	(Netherlands) Calvin Vlaanderen	1–2, 4–18
Gebben Van Venrooy Yamaha Racing	Yamaha	151	(Estonia) Harri Kullas	13–14, 16–17
F&H Kawasaki Racing Team	Kawasaki	14	(Australia) Jed Beaton	1–5, 9–17
Team Ship to Cycle Honda SR Motoblouz	Honda	16	(France) Benoît Paturel	4–6, 9–11, 13–16
Team Ship to Cycle Honda SR Motoblouz	Honda	105	(Belgium) Cyril Genot	14
JWR Honda Racing	Honda	18	Vsevolod Brylyakov	2
JWR Honda Racing	Honda	46	(Netherlands) Davy Pootjes	1, 10–11, 13–15
JWR Honda Racing	Honda	147	(Finland) Miro Sihvonen	4–11, 14, 16
JWR Honda Racing	Honda	474	(Netherlands) Twan van Essen	13–14
Diga Procross KTM Racing	KTM	19	(Denmark) Thomas Kjær Olsen	1–3, 6
Diga Procross KTM Racing	KTM	426	(United Kingdom) Conrad Mewse	13–15
Riley Racing	Yamaha	23	(France) Christophe Charlier	7–10
Riley Racing	Yamaha	32	(Belgium) Brent Van Doninck	1–2, 4–11, 13–17
JM Honda Racing	Honda	29	(Germany) Henry Jacobi	1–11, 13–18
JM Honda Racing	Honda	128	(Italy) Ivo Monticelli	4–6, 9–11, 13–18
Standing Construct Husqvarna Factory Racing Team	Husqvarna	41	(Latvia) Pauls Jonass	2–13, 15–18
Standing Construct Husqvarna Factory Racing Team	Husqvarna	189	(Netherlands) Brian Bogers	All
Team HRC	Honda	43	(Australia) Mitchell Evans	All
Team HRC	Honda	243	(Slovenia) Tim Gajser	All
Red Bull GasGas Factory Racing	Gas Gas	61	(Spain) Jorge Prado	1–6, 8–18
Red Bull GasGas Factory Racing	Gas Gas	101	(Italy) Mattia Guadagnini	8–18
Honda 114 Motorsports	Honda	70	(Spain) Rubén Fernández	1–13, 15–18
Honda 114 Motorsports	Honda	427	(Norway) Håkon Fredriksen	13
Sahkar Racing	KTM	75	(Estonia) Hardi Roosiorg	1–2, 4–11, 14–16
Beta SDM Corse MX Team	Beta	77	(Italy) Alessandro Lupino	1–2, 4, 7, 9
Beta SDM Corse MX Team	Beta	89	(Belgium) Jeremy Van Horebeek	1–11, 13–17
iXS MXGP Team	Yamaha	87	(Switzerland) Kevin Brumann	13–17
iXS MXGP Team	Yamaha	92	(Switzerland) Valentin Guillod	1, 9–10, 13, 15, 18
Monster Energy Yamaha Factory MXGP Team	Yamaha	91	(Switzerland) Jeremy Seewer	All
Monster Energy Yamaha Factory MXGP Team	Yamaha	259	(Netherlands) Glenn Coldenhoff	All
Monster Energy Yamaha Factory MXGP Team	Yamaha	959	(France) Maxime Renaux	1–11, 13–18
KMP Honda Racing	Honda	99	(Spain) Jorge Zaragoza	2, 5, 7, 9
JK Racing Yamaha	Yamaha	161	(Sweden) Alvin Östlund	1–2, 4–18
JD Gunnex KTM Racing Team	KTM	183	(Venezuela) Lorenzo Locurcio	2, 11, 13
JD Gunnex KTM Racing Team	KTM	831	(Poland) Tomasz Wysocki	13
Fantic Factory Team Maddii	Fantic	211	(Italy) Nicholas Lapucci	2, 4–5, 9–13, 18
KTM Kosak Team	KTM	226	(Germany) Tom Koch	1–2, 4–5, 10–11, 13–17
SM Action Racing Team Yuasa Battery	Gas Gas	303	(Italy) Alberto Forato	1–10, 13–18
MRT Racing Team KTM	KTM	747	(Italy) Michele Cervellin	
JT911 KTM Racing Team	KTM	911	(France) Jordi Tixier	1–13, 15–16
Wild Card Teams & Riders
Team	Constructor	No	Rider	Rounds
Osička MX Team	KTM	12	(Slovakia) Šimon Jošt	13
Osička MX Team	KTM	377	(Czech Republic) Martin Krč	11, 13
Scoccia Racing Team	Kawasaki	15	(Italy) David Philippaerts	7
Scandinavian Racing Sports	KTM	30	(Sweden) Eddie Hjortmarker	15
Team Wenger Bike	Gas Gas	31	(Switzerland) Loris Freidig	7
	Husqvarna	40	(Estonia) Tanel Leok	6, 16
Motos VR Yamaha Team	Yamaha	47	(Portugal) Luís Outeiro	4
Team AB Racing by Zweiradsport Schmitz	Husqvarna	66	(Germany) Tim Koch	11
Agroservimotos Honda Chile	Honda	76	(Chile) Sergio Villaronga	3
	Yamaha	85	(Argentina) Agustín Carrasco	3
Rentor Racing	KTM	97	(Slovakia) Denis Poláš	11, 13
BM Racing AXO Argentina	Kawasaki	102	(Argentina) Iván Galván	3
KTM Scandinavia/CEC Racing	KTM	107	(Sweden) Emil Jönrup	15
	Suzuki	112	(Argentina) Francisco Cabarcos	3
	Yamaha	117	(Argentina) Pablo Galletta	3
KTM Zauner Racing Team	KTM	118	(Austria) Markus Rammel	13
	Yamaha	120	(Argentina) Marcos Trossero	3
KTM Eesti/Adrenalin Arena	KTM	132	(Estonia) Karel Kutsar	16
JB Racing Team	Gas Gas	138	(France) David Herbreteau	17
Silve Racing	KTM	142	(Finland) Jere Haavisto	14–16
Castrol Axion Sport MX Team	Suzuki	144	(Uruguay) Nicolás Rolando	3
Castrol Axion Sport MX Team	Suzuki	707	(Argentina) Víctor Dario Arco	3
Phoenix Evenstrokes Kawasaki	Kawasaki	152	(Bulgaria) Petar Petrov	10, 14
DC Racing Parts / Lelli Competición	Kawasaki	157	(Argentina) Diego Soria	3
RMS MX Team	KTM	162	(Indonesia) Farhan Hendro	12
Phoenix Lining Services/Sixty7	Husqvarna	167	(Australia) Nicholas Murray	12
P&P Racing	Gas Gas	188	(Czech Republic) Dušan Drdaj	13
JH-MX Service	Gas Gas	194	(Netherlands) Sven van der Mierden	14
FZ Motorsport	Gas Gas	200	(Italy) Filippo Zonta	2, 7
Millionaire Racing Team	Husqvarna	223	(Italy) Giuseppe Tropepe	10–11
MB Team	Honda	225	(France) Charles Lefrançois	2, 5
Holeshot2ROO	Honda	238	(France) Pierre Moine	10
Husqvarna Scandinavia	Husqvarna	248	(Sweden) Emil Berggren	15
Schmicker Racing	KTM	260	(Germany) Nico Koch	11
Motostar.se	Husqvarna	297	(Sweden) Anton Gole	11
Orion Racing Team	KTM	322	(Slovakia) Pavol Repčák	13
SC Sporthomes Husqvarna	Husqvarna	326	(United Kingdom) Josh Gilbert	14
Team Rizqy Motor Boss Mild	KTM	336	(Australia) Lewis Stewart	12
	Gas Gas	388	(Greece) Panagiotis Kouzis	18
	Kawasaki	494	(Argentina) Flavio Nicolás Sastre	3
Dreams Racing	KTM	644	(Italy) Ismaele Guarise	2, 5, 7
Ronnangsgard Racing	Yamaha	667	(Sweden) Anton Nordström Graaf	15
Biffens MC	Husqvarna	692	(Sweden) Danne Karlsson	15
Team Husqvarna Mezher	Husqvarna	701	(Venezuela) Humberto Martín	3
Gabriel KTM Motocross Team	KTM	714	(United Kingdom) Brad Todd	10
KTM Sarholz Racing Team	KTM	811	(United Kingdom) Adam Sterry	13
Radikal Racing / Ukko Moto Parts	KTM	833	(Argentina) Lautaro Toro	3
Insubria Team Motocross	Yamaha	888	(Italy) Gianluca Deghi	7
	Yamaha	988	(France) Lionel Kerhoas	12

==== Riders Championship ====
Pos	Nr	Rider	Bike	GBR (United Kingdom)		LOM		ARG (Argentina)		POR (Portugal)		TRE		LAT (Latvia)		ITA (Italy)		SAR (Sardinia)		ESP (Spain)		FRA (France)		GER (Germany)		IDN (Indonesia)		CZE (Czech Republic)		FLA (Flanders)		SWE (Sweden)		FIN (Finland)		CHA		TUR (Turkey)		Points
1	243	(Slovenia) Tim Gajser	Honda	1	2	2	1	2	1	3	1	1	1	1	1	1	1	2	12	2	6	5	4	1	2	1	1	2	3	7	7	4	2	6	7	2	1	3	2	763
2	91	(Switzerland) Jeremy Seewer	Yamaha	2	4	4	5	3	Ret	5	7	5	3	7	8	2	2	4	6	11	4	1	2	3	1	12	9	1	2	6	5	2	1	4	2	1	3	2	3	657
3	61	(Spain) Jorge Prado	Gas Gas	4	1	1	7	4	4	1	2	3	4	12	13			3	3	3	11	2	3	7	3	2	2	5	5	9	10	5	6	9	12	4	2	7	4	589
4	959	(France) Maxime Renaux	Yamaha	3	6	3	2	1	2	11	11	4	2	6	5	3	3	6	4	1	1	9	6	DNS	DNS			3	1	5	6	1	Ret	3	3	5	4	1	8	578
5	259	(Netherlands) Glenn Coldenhoff	Yamaha	9	3	17	14	8	6	4	3	2	11	5	3	8	12	8	2	5	2	12	1	10	8	4	6	4	4	4	1	3	5	2	1	6	8	14	6	575
6	189	(Netherlands) Brian Bogers	Husqvarna	7	12	7	3	DNS	DNS	2	4	8	5	8	6	9	14	5	5	4	3	DNS	DNS	17	16	15	16	10	8	1	3	15	8	1	6	13	14	10	10	428
7	10	(Netherlands) Calvin Vlaanderen	Yamaha	12	11	12	17			8	6	6	Ret	14	7	4	7	1	1	13	13	15	Ret	12	4	20	10	7	6	2	2	Ret	7	11	5	8	7	9	17	395
8	70	(Spain) Rubén Fernández	Honda	20	5	5	6	15	3	6	9	11	7	3	4	6	5	16	7	6	7	7	5	5	5	3	4	DNS	DNS			17	13	16	Ret	12	9	19	DNS	382
9	41	(Latvia) Pauls Jonass	Husqvarna			10	DNS	6	5	7	5	17	Ret	2	2	5	8	9	10	9	9	11	7	2	13	7	7	12	Ret			7	16	13	10	11	6	DNS	DNS	350
10	43	(Australia) Mitchell Evans	Honda	17	22	13	15	10	8	15	12	10	9	19	12	13	6	22	Ret	12	8	22	10	8	6	6	5	6	7	Ret	DNS	10	4	14	20	7	11	12	18	308
11	303	(Italy) Alberto Forato	Gas Gas	6	8	8	Ret	12	13	10	8	9	Ret	4	9	Ret	13	14	11	7	12	Ret	DNS					24	16	18	18	11	10	8	11	9	10	5	7	280
12	919	(United Kingdom) Ben Watson	Kawasaki	11	13	16	11	14	10	12	17	18	6	13	10	10	4	17	18	DNS	DNS	8	9	13	17	14	13	9	13	10	13	13	14	15	18	17	17	15	12	275
13	89	(Belgium) Jeremy Van Horebeek	Beta	10	9	9	8	7	7	9	10	7	8	9	19	7	9	10	9	Ret	Ret	6	8	Ret	9			11	DNS	Ret	Ret	16	11	10	Ret	Ret	DNS			265
14	3	(France) Romain Febvre	Kawasaki																					4	7	5	3	15	DNS	3	4	6	3	5	8	3	5	8	1	250
15	32	(Belgium) Brent Van Doninck	Yamaha	14	15	14	13			Ret	15	16	13	11	17	12	11	7	20	18	20	3	12	15	12			14	12	12	8	8	9	7	4	10	Ret			249
16	29	(Germany) Henry Jacobi	Honda	13	14	19	12	11	12	14	Ret	14	Ret	10	14	11	15	13	19	16	15	4	22	9	11			16	15	11	9	Ret	Ret	12	9	16	18	11	11	236
17	101	(Italy) Mattia Guadagnini	Gas Gas															11	8	8	5	DNS	DNS	6	19	8	8	8	11	8	16	12	21	20	13	14	12	4	5	204
18	911	(France) Jordi Tixier	KTM	Ret	16	15	9	9	9	13	Ret	12	10	16	11	17	10	15	14	Ret	16	10	11	11	10	9	12	Ret	DNS			14	17	DNS	DNS					197
19	14	(Australia) Jed Beaton	Kawasaki	5	7	11	Ret	13	11	18	13	15	14							14	17	13	13	14	14	10	14	Ret	10	17	15	19	18	19	14	15	13			190
20	161	(Sweden) Alvin Östlund	Yamaha	16	19	18	18			17	16	19	15	21	18	19	17	12	13	20	19	16	14	Ret	20	13	15	Ret	22	15	12	Ret	20	18	19	DNS	DNS	13	14	122
21	92	(Switzerland) Valentin Guillod	Yamaha	15	17															10	10	DNS	DNS					13	9			9	12					6	9	100
22	226	(Germany) Tom Koch	KTM	18	18	20	16			16	14	13	12									21	18	18	15			21	17	16	14	23	15	21	16	19	16			87
23	19	(Denmark) Thomas Kjær Olsen	KTM	8	10	6	4	5	Ret					DNS	DNS																									73
24	128	(Italy) Ivo Monticelli	Honda							23	18	DNS	DNS	17	Ret					17	14	18	15	20	18			25	14	21	11	22	19	Ret	Ret	18	Ret	16	15	64
25	211	(Italy) Nicholas Lapucci	Fantic			23	24			19	20	DNS	DNS							19	Ret	20	16	DNS	DNS	11	11	DNS	DNS									17	13	43
26	16	(France) Benoît Paturel	Honda							24	19	DNS	DNS	Ret	DNS					15	18	14	Ret	16	Ret			17	18	13	Ret	26	23	Ret	DNS					38
27	75	(Estonia) Hardi Roosiorg	KTM	19	21	22	22			20	21	Ret	16	15	15	21	18	21	16	22	21	19	19	DNS	DNS					Ret	Ret	27	Ret	24	Ret					32
28	151	(Estonia) Harri Kullas	Yamaha																									20	21	23	17			17	15	Ret	15			21
29	77	(Italy) Alessandro Lupino	Beta	Ret	Ret	26	10			DNS	DNS					14	Ret			Ret	DNS																			18
30	147	(Finland) Miro Sihvonen	Honda							22	22	20	18	18	20	22	20	20	17	23	22	17	DNS	DNS	DNS					DNS	DNS			Ret	DNS					18
31	23	(France) Christophe Charlier	Yamaha													16	Ret	19	15	Ret	Ret	Ret	17																	17
32	99	(Spain) Jorge Zaragoza	Honda			24	21					21	17			18	16			21	Ret																			12
33	144	(Uruguay) Nicolás Rolando	Suzuki					18	14																															10
34	105	(Belgium) Cyril Genot	Honda																											14	19									9
35	336	(Australia) Lewis Stewart	KTM																							16	17													9
36	142	(Finland) Jere Haavisto	KTM																											19	Ret	18	Ret	Ret	17					9
37	388	(Greece) Panagiotis Kouzis	Gas Gas																																			18	16	8
38	87	(Switzerland) Kevin Brumann	Yamaha																									19	19	20	21	20	Ret	DNS	DNS	20	20			8
39	167	(Australia) Nicholas Murray	Husqvarna																							17	18													7
40	76	(Chile) Sergio Villaronga	Honda					21	15																															6
41	15	(Italy) David Philippaerts	Kawasaki													15	Ret																							6
42	40	(Estonia) Tanel Leok	Husqvarna											20	16																			22	21					6
43	707	(Argentina) Víctor Dario Arco	Suzuki					20	16																															6
44	7	(Lithuania) Arminas Jasikonis	Yamaha	Ret	20	Ret	19											18	Ret	Ret	DNS																			6
45	701	(Venezuela) Humberto Martín	Husqvarna					16	Ret																															5
46	162	(Indonesia) Farhan Hendro	KTM																							18	19													5
47	120	(Argentina) Marcos Trossero	Yamaha					22	17																															4
48	833	(Argentina) Lautaro Toro	KTM					17	Ret																															4
49	85	(Argentina) Agustín Carrasco	Yamaha					19	19																															4
50	200	(Italy) Filippo Zonta	Gas Gas			25	20									20	19																							4
51	117	(Argentina) Pablo Galletta	Yamaha					25	18																															3
52	811	(United Kingdom) Adam Sterry	KTM																									18	Ret											3
53	988	(France) Lionel Kerhoas	Yamaha																							19	20													3
54	183	(Venezuela) Lorenzo Locurcio	KTM			21	23																	19	Ret			DNS	DNS											2
55	138	(France) David Herbreteau	Gas Gas																																	21	19			2
56	644	(Italy) Ismaele Guarise	KTM			27	25					22	19			23	DNS																							2
57	223	(Italy) Giuseppe Tropepe	Husqvarna																			Ret	20	22	Ret															1
58	194	(Netherlands) Sven van der Mierden	Gas Gas																											22	20									1
59	225	(France) Charles Lefrançois	Honda			28	26					23	20																											1
60	188	(Czech Republic) Dušan Drdaj	Gas Gas																									23	20											1
61	112	(Argentina) Francisco Cabarcos	Suzuki					24	20																															1
	297	(Sweden) Anton Gole	Husqvarna																					21	21															0
	47	(Portugal) Luís Outeiro	Yamaha							21	23																													0
	714	(United Kingdom) Brad Todd	KTM																			23	21																	0
	31	(Switzerland) Loris Freidig	Gas Gas													24	21																							0
	667	(Sweden) Anton Nordström Graaf	Yamaha																													21	25							0
	157	(Argentina) Diego Soria	Kawasaki					27	21																															0
	377	(Czech Republic) Martin Krč	KTM																					25	23			22	23											0
	66	(Germany) Tim Koch	Husqvarna																					24	22															0
	326	(United Kingdom) Josh Gilbert	Husqvarna																											25	22									0
	30	(Sweden) Eddie Hjortmarker	KTM																													25	22							0
	102	(Argentina) Iván Galván	Kawasaki					26	22																															0
	888	(Italy) Gianluca Deghi	Yamaha													Ret	22																							0
	238	(France) Pierre Moine	Honda																			24	23																	0
	494	(Argentina) Flavio Nicolás Sastre	Kawasaki					23	Ret																															0
	260	(Germany) Nico Koch	KTM																					23	Ret															0
	132	(Estonia) Karel Kutsar	KTM																															23	Ret					0
	426	(United Kingdom) Conrad Mewse	KTM																									27	24	24	Ret	24	24							0
	97	(Slovakia) Denis Poláš	KTM																					27	24			DNS	DNS											0
	322	(Slovakia) Pavol Repčák	KTM																									29	25											0
	107	(Sweden) Emil Jönrup	KTM																													28	26							0
	46	(Netherlands) Davy Pootjes	Honda	DNS	DNS																	DNS	DNS	26	Ret			Ret	Ret	DNS	DNS	DNS	DNS							0
	152	(Bulgaria) Petar Petrov	Kawasaki																			Ret	Ret							26	Ret									0
	831	(Poland) Tomasz Wysocki	KTM																									26	Ret											0
	474	(Netherlands) Twan van Essen	Honda																									DNS	DNS	27	Ret									0
	248	(Sweden) Emil Berggren	Husqvarna																													Ret	27							0
	118	(Austria) Markus Rammel	KTM																									28	Ret											0
	427	(Norway) Håkon Fredriksen	Honda																									Ret	Ret											0
	692	(Sweden) Danne Karlsson	Husqvarna																													Ret	Ret							0
	172	(France) Mathys Boisramé	KTM	DNS	DNS																																			0
	18	Vsevolod Brylyakov	Honda			DNS	DNS																																	0
	12	(Slovakia) Šimon Jošt	KTM																									DNS	DNS											0
Pos	Nr	Rider	Bike	GBR (United Kingdom)		LOM		ARG (Argentina)		POR (Portugal)		TRE		LAT (Latvia)		ITA (Italy)		SAR (Sardinia)		ESP (Spain)		FRA (France)		GER (Germany)		IDN (Indonesia)		CZE (Czech Republic)		FLA (Flanders)		SWE (Sweden)		FIN (Finland)		CHA		TUR (Turkey)		Points

==== Manufacturers Championship ====
Pos	Bike	GBR (United Kingdom)		LOM		ARG (Argentina)		POR (Portugal)		TRE		LAT (Latvia)		ITA (Italy)		SAR (Sardinia)		ESP (Spain)		FRA (France)		GER (Germany)		IDN (Indonesia)		CZE (Czech Republic)		FLA (Flanders)		SWE (Sweden)		FIN (Finland)		CHA		TUR (Turkey)		Points
1	Yamaha	2	3	3	2	1	2	4	3	2	2	5	3	2	2	1	1	1	1	1	1	3	1	4	6	1	1	2	1	1	1	2	1	1	3	1	3	805
2	Honda	1	2	2	1	2	1	3	1	1	1	1	1	1	1	2	7	2	6	4	4	1	2	1	1	2	3	7	7	4	2	6	7	2	1	3	2	770
3	Gas Gas	4	1	1	7	4	4	1	2	3	4	4	9	20	13	3	3	3	5	2	3	6	3	2	2	5	5	8	10	5	6	8	11	4	2	4	4	625
4	Husqvarna	7	12	7	3	6	5	2	4	8	5	2	2	5	8	5	5	4	3	11	7	2	13	7	7	10	8	1	3	7	8	1	6	11	6	10	10	565
5	Kawasaki	5	7	11	11	13	10	12	13	15	6	13	10	10	4	17	18	14	17	8	9	4	7	5	3	9	10	3	4	6	3	5	8	3	5	8	1	465
6	KTM	8	10	6	4	5	9	13	14	12	10	15	11	17	10	15	14	22	16	10	11	11	10	9	12	18	17	16	14	14	15	21	16	19	16			276
7	Beta	10	9	9	8	7	7	9	10	7	8	9	19	7	9	10	9	Ret	Ret	6	8	Ret	9			11	DNS	Ret	Ret	16	11	10	Ret	Ret	DNS			265
8	Fantic			23	24			19	20	DNS	DNS							19	Ret	20	16	DNS	DNS	11	11	DNS	DNS									17	13	43
9	Suzuki					18	14																															10
Pos	Bike	GBR (United Kingdom)		LOM		ARG (Argentina)		POR (Portugal)		TRE		LAT (Latvia)		ITA (Italy)		SAR (Sardinia)		ESP (Spain)		FRA (France)		GER (Germany)		IDN (Indonesia)		CZE (Czech Republic)		FLA (Flanders)		SWE (Sweden)		FIN (Finland)		CHA		TUR (Turkey)		Points

Vsevolod Brylyakov was a neutral competitor using the designation MFR (Motorcycle Federation of Russia), as the World Anti-Doping Agency implemented a ban on Russia competing at World Championships.

== MX2 ==
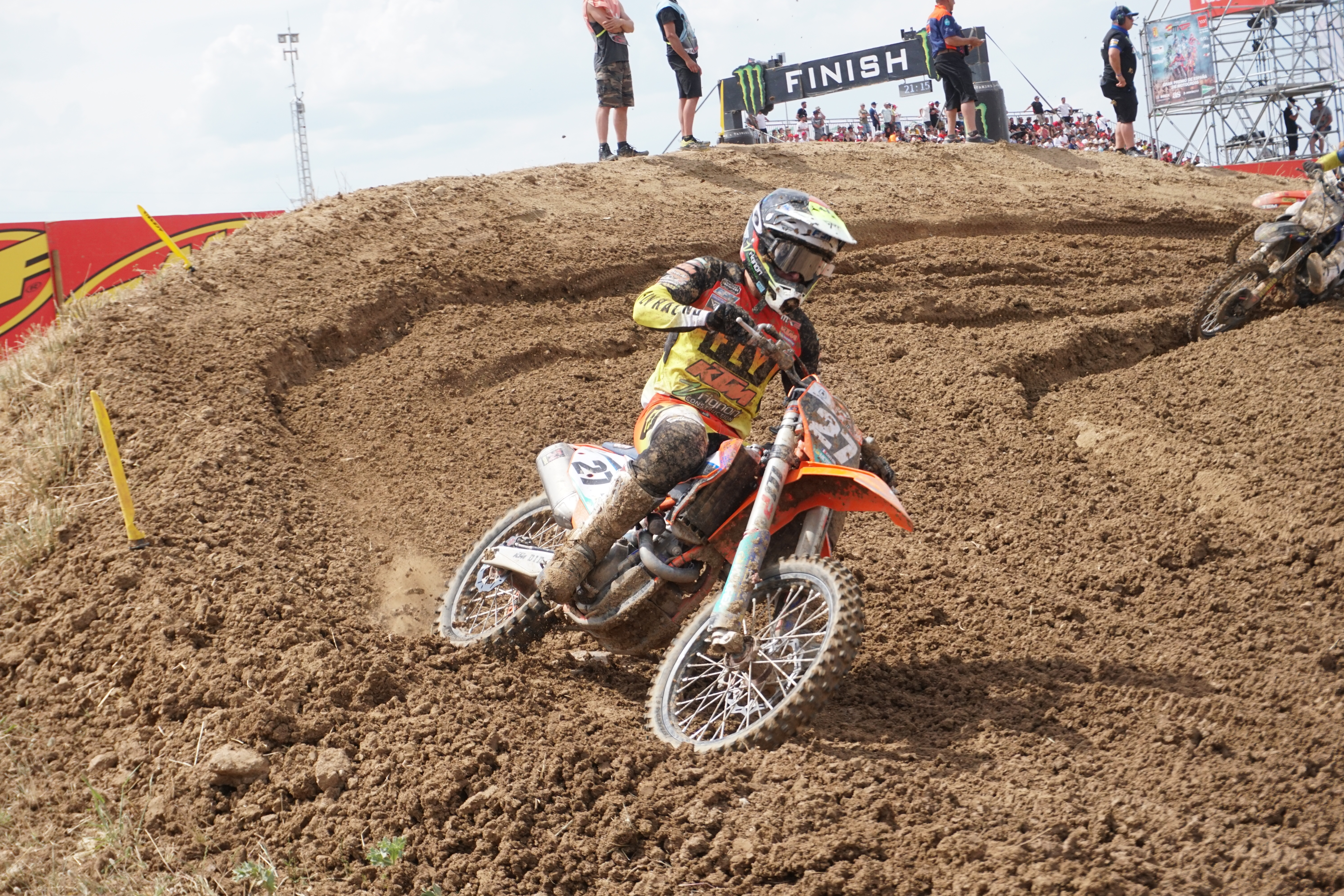
Tom Guyon in Spain 2022

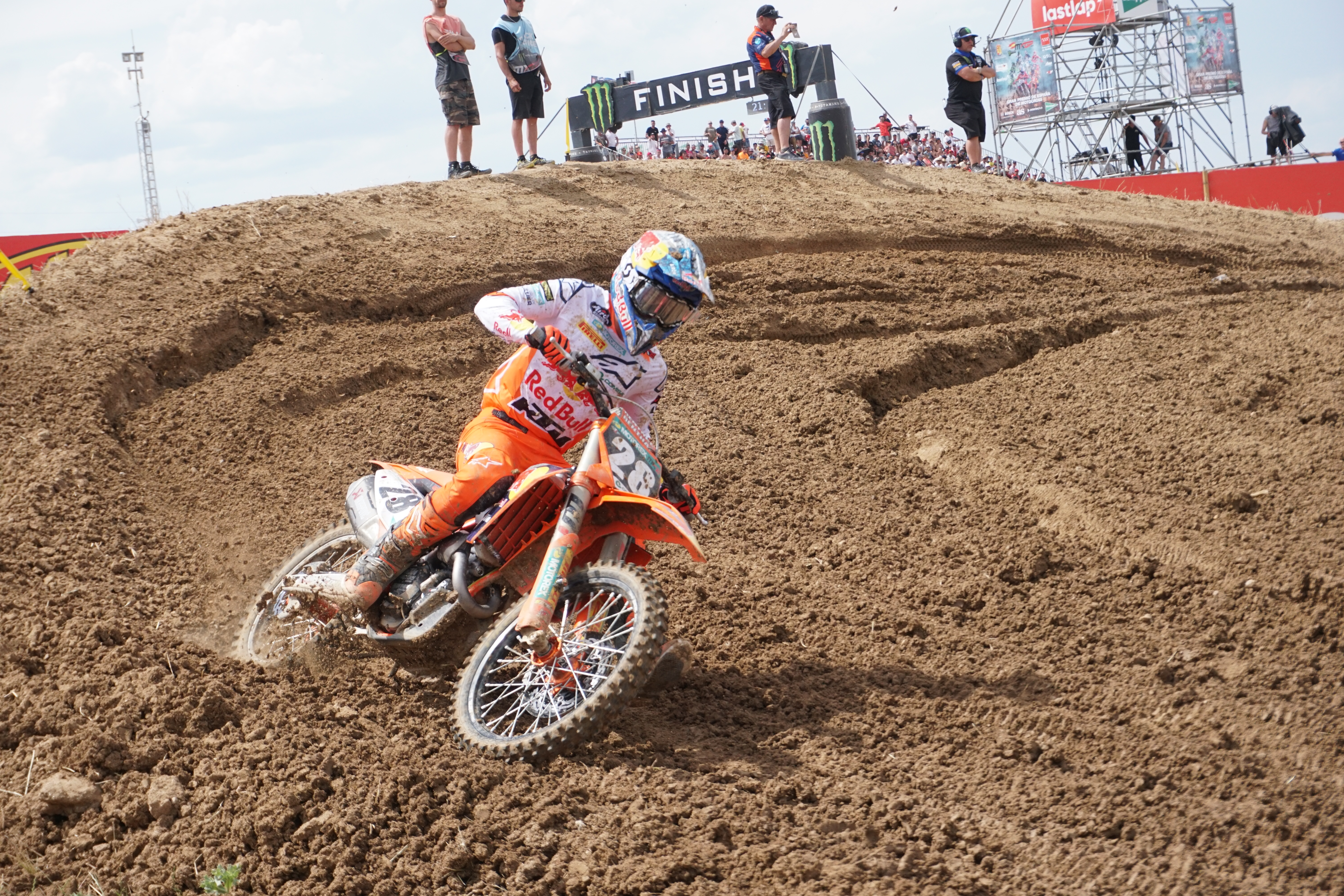
Tom Vialle in Spain 2022

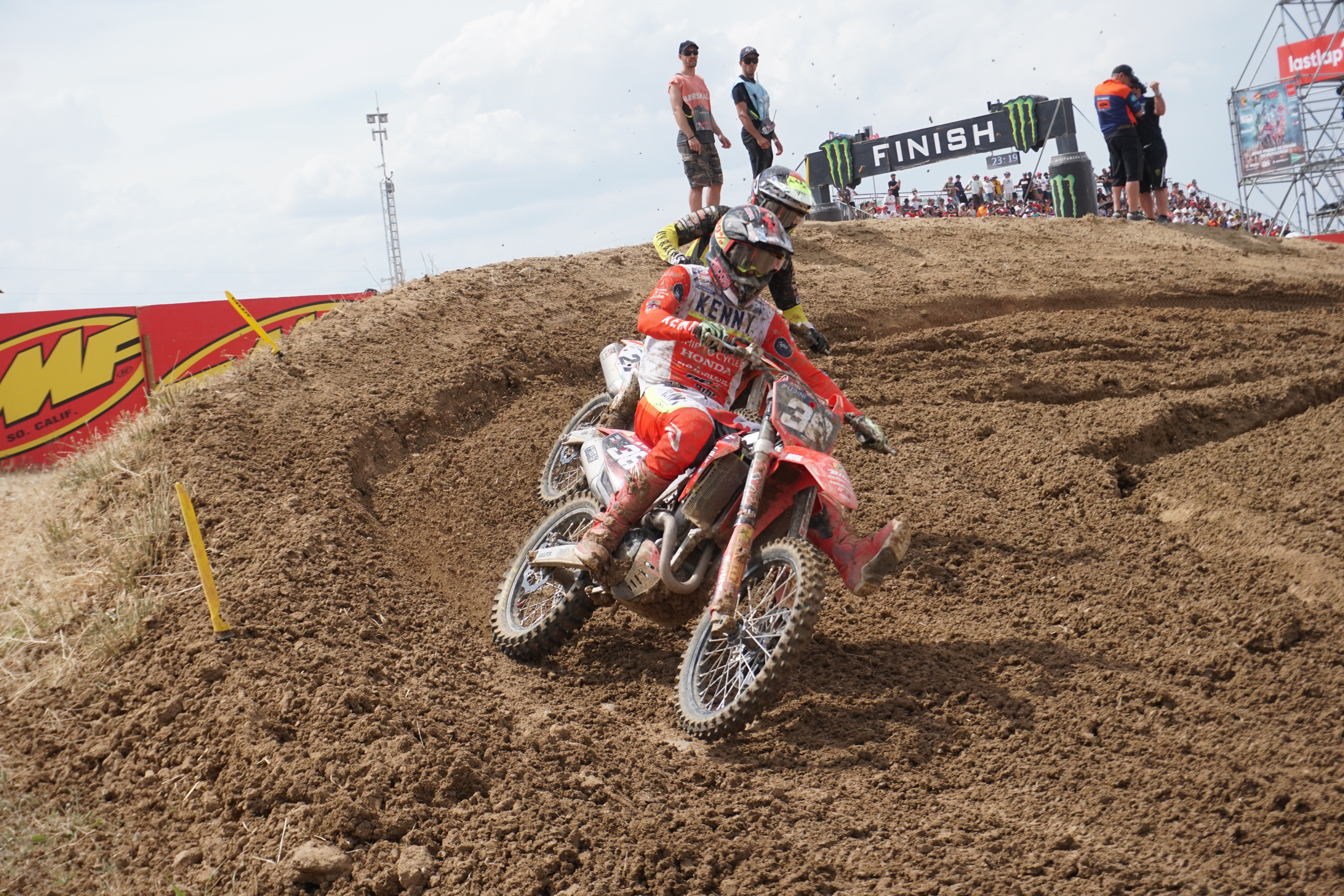
Stephen Rubini in Spain 2022

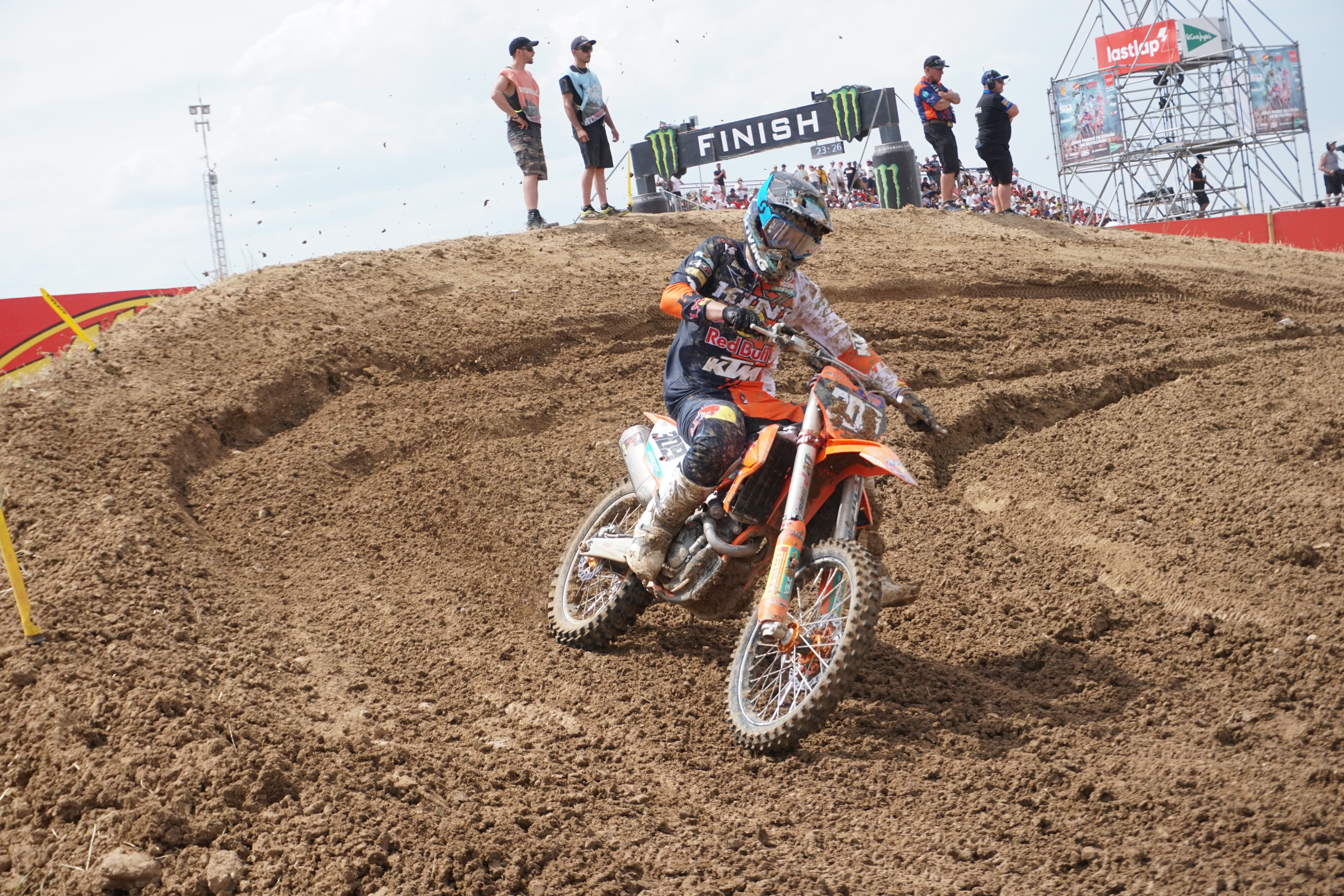
Guillem Farrés in Spain 2022

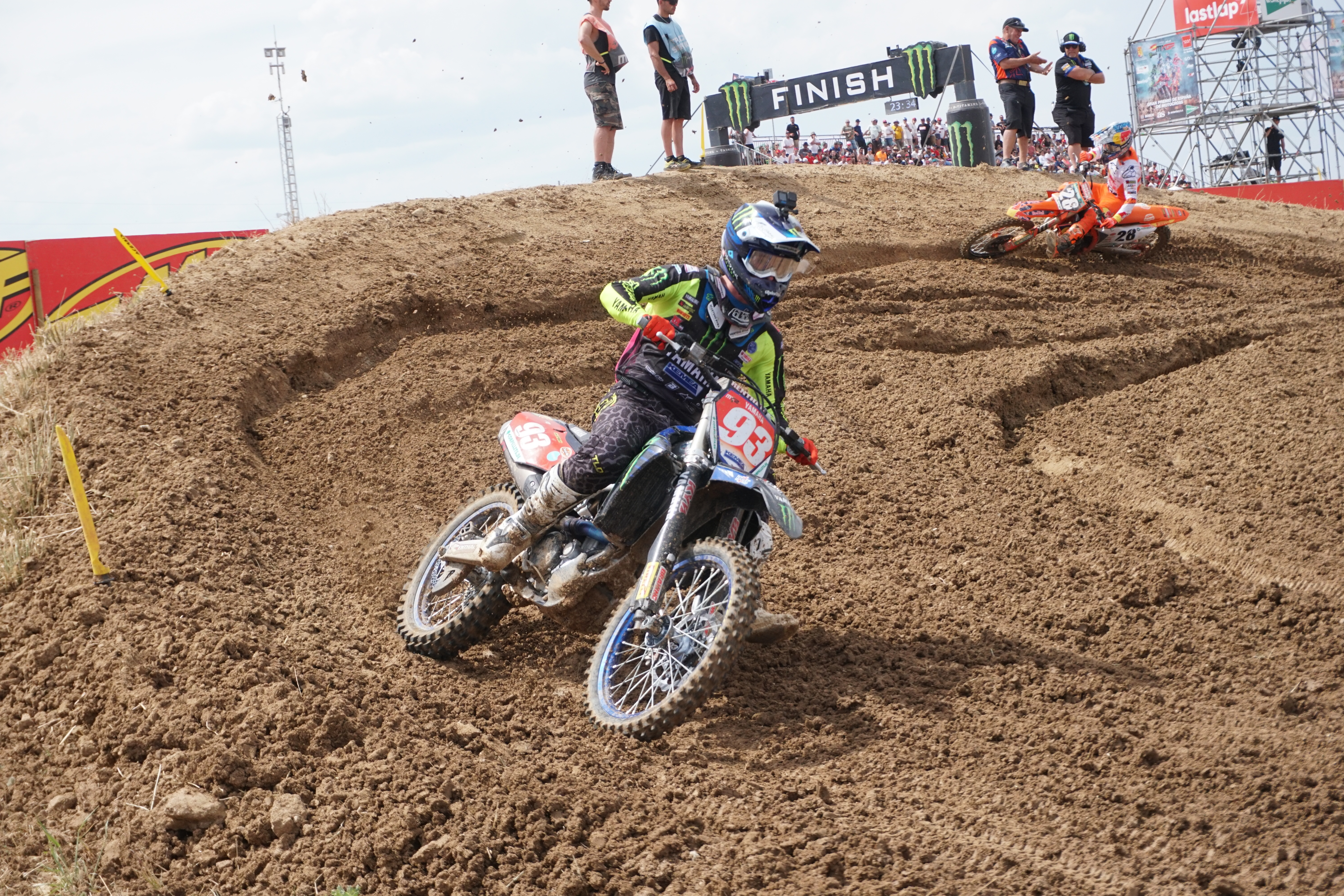
Jago Geerts in Spain 2022

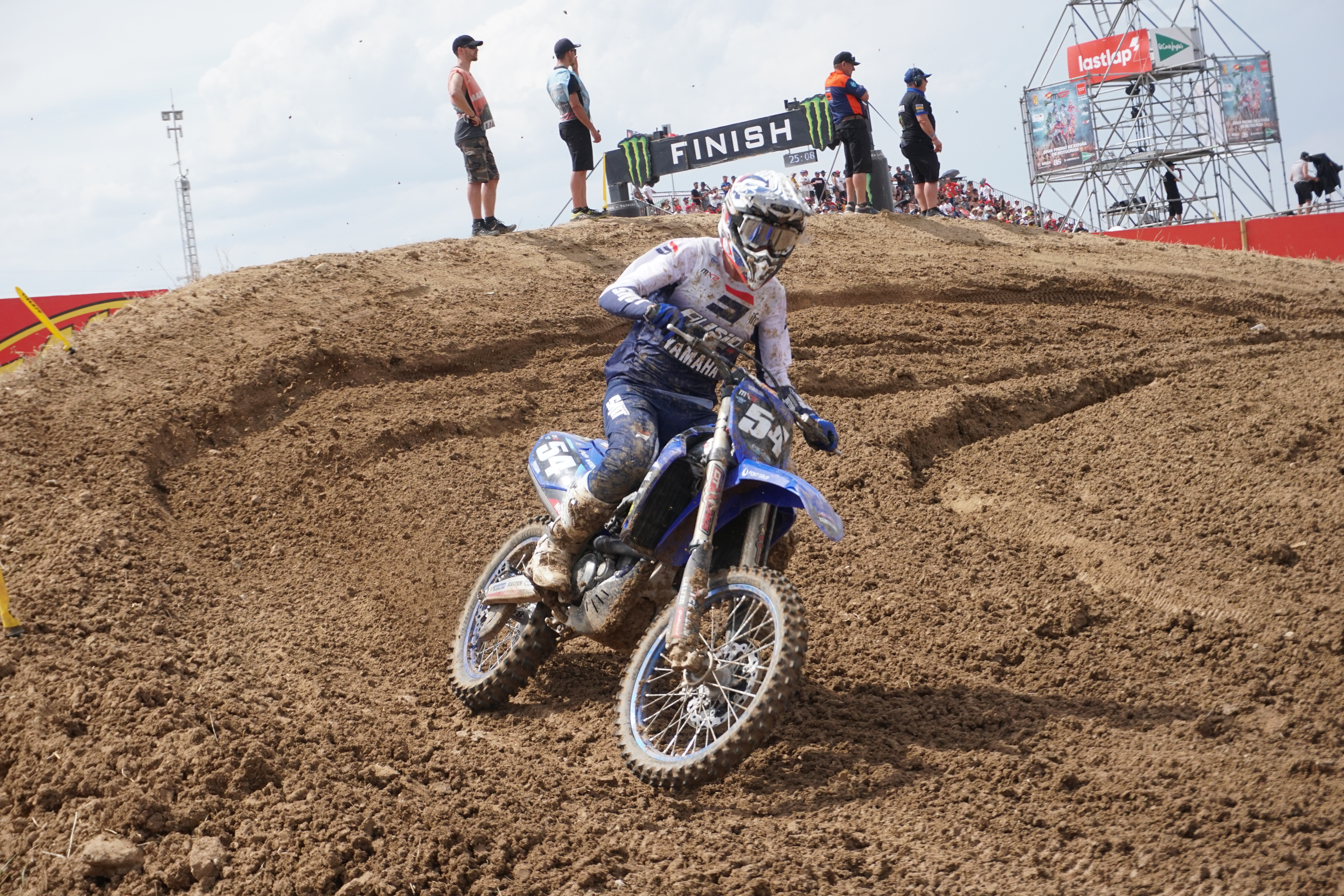
Eric Tomás in Spain 2022

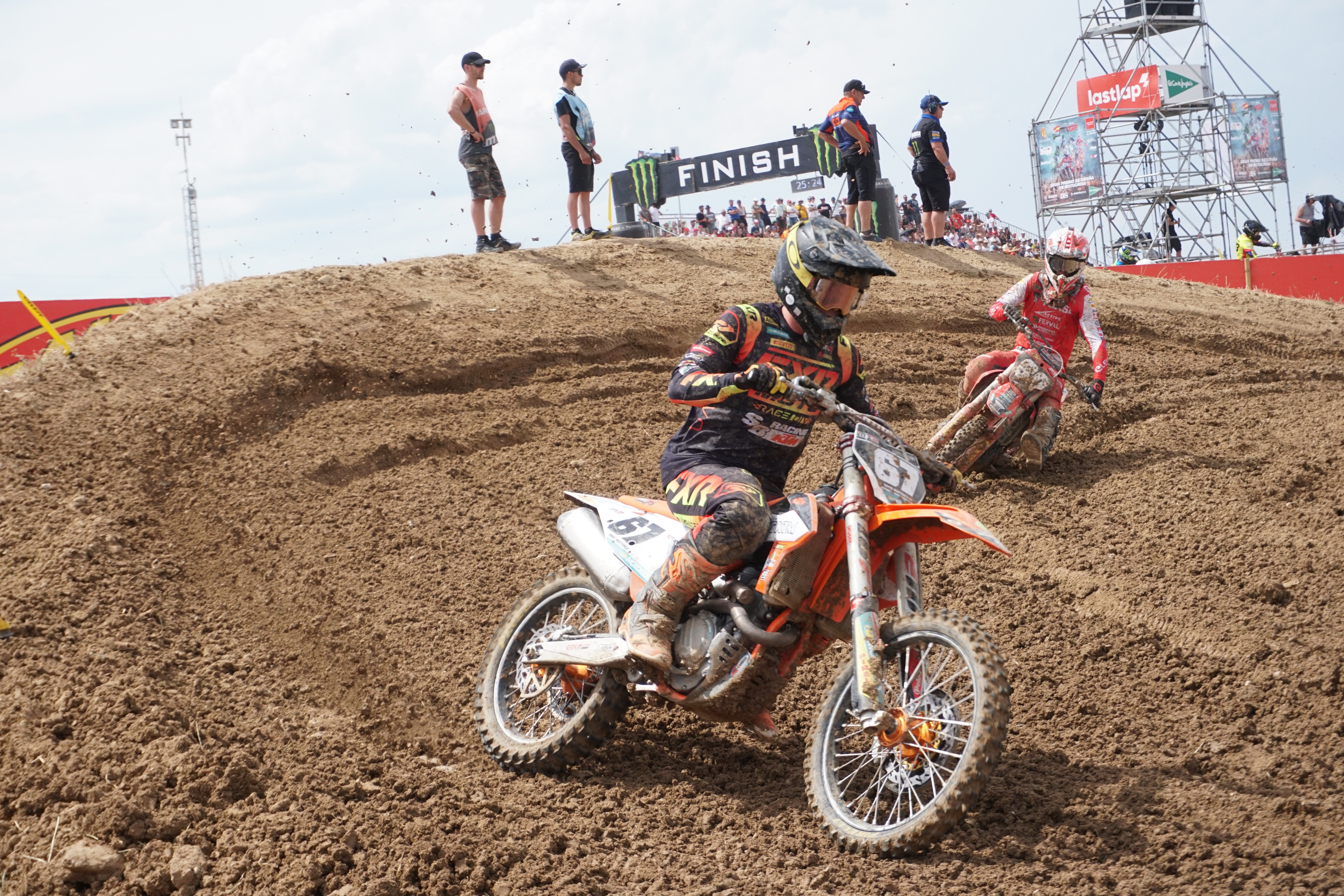
Yago Martínez.jpg in Spain 2022

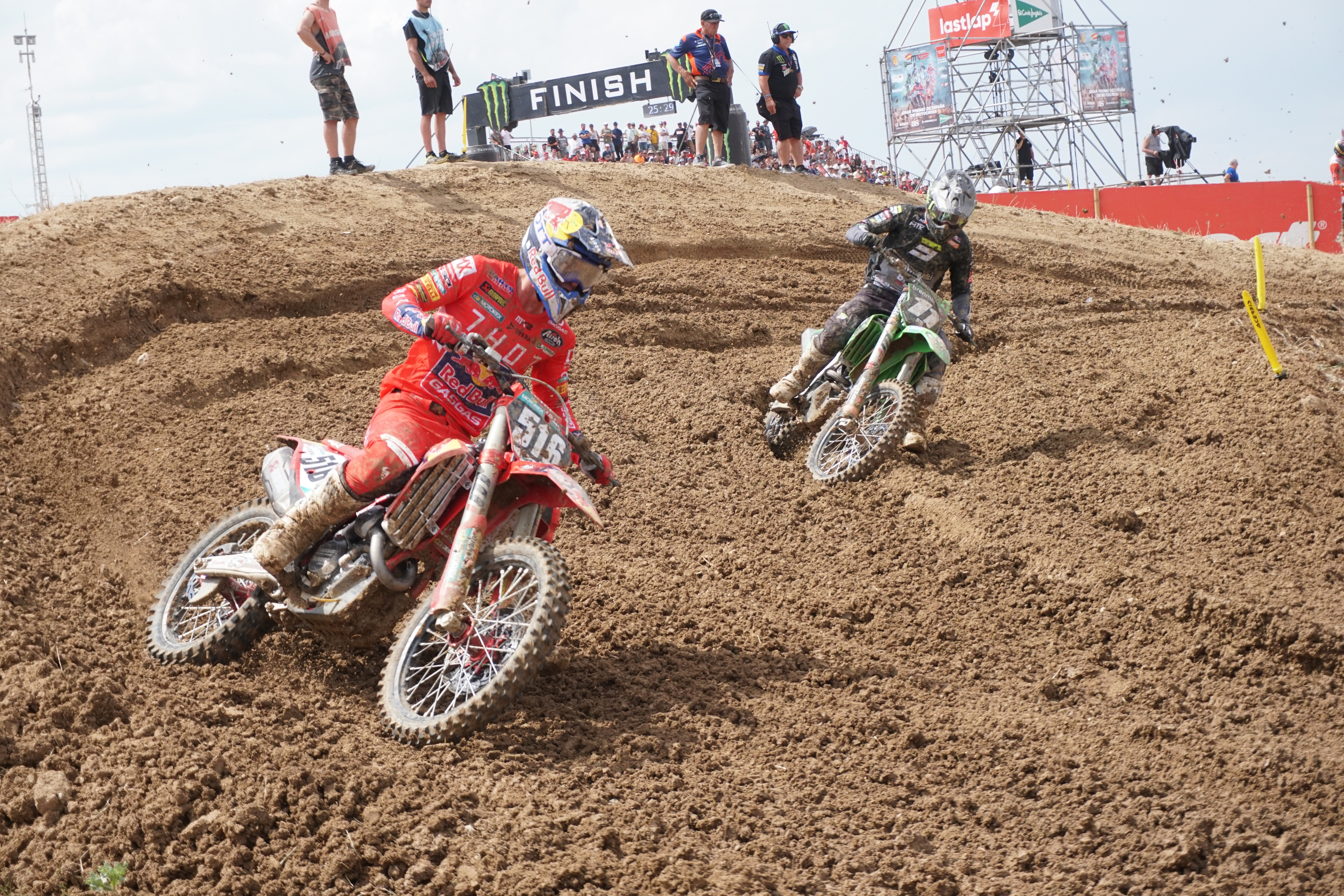
Simon Längenfelder in Spain 2022

=== Entry list ===
Officially Approved Teams & Riders
Team	Constructor	No	Rider	Rounds
Big Van World MTX Kawasaki	Kawasaki	11	(Denmark) Mikkel Haarup	All
Big Van World MTX Kawasaki	Kawasaki	20	(United Kingdom) Taylor Hammal	
KTM Beddini MX2	KTM	22	(Italy) Gianluca Facchetti	1–3, 13
F&H Kawasaki Racing Team	Kawasaki	24	(Norway) Kevin Horgmo	All
Riley Racing	Yamaha	26	(Sweden) Tim Edberg	1–2, 6
Riley Racing	Yamaha	912	(United Kingdom) Joel Rizzi	7–8, 13–17
Team VRT KTM Veritise	KTM	27	(France) Tom Guyon	4–7, 9–11, 13–17
Team VRT KTM Veritise	KTM	98	(Spain) David Braceras	9
Red Bull KTM Factory Racing	KTM	28	(France) Tom Vialle	All
Hitachi KTM fuelled by Milwaukee	KTM	33	(Netherlands) Kay Karssemakers	1–2, 6–18
Hitachi KTM fuelled by Milwaukee	KTM	517	(Sweden) Isak Gifting	1–11
Monster Energy Yamaha Factory MX2 Team	Yamaha	35	(Italy) Andrea Bonacorsi	1
Monster Energy Yamaha Factory MX2 Team	Yamaha	93	(Belgium) Jago Geerts	All
Monster Energy Yamaha Factory MX2 Team	Yamaha	198	(France) Thibault Benistant	4–18
Team Ship to Cycle Honda SR Motoblouz	Honda	38	(France) Stephen Rubini	All
Team Ship to Cycle Honda SR Motoblouz	Honda	125	(Finland) Emil Weckman	1, 17–18
Nestaan Husqvarna Factory Racing	Husqvarna	39	(Netherlands) Roan van de Moosdijk	1–3, 14–18
Nestaan Husqvarna Factory Racing	Husqvarna	74	(Netherlands) Kay de Wolf	1–7, 11–18
Nestaan Husqvarna Factory Racing	Husqvarna	104	(Germany) Jeremy Sydow	6
Nestaan Husqvarna Factory Racing	Husqvarna	359	(France) Maxime Grau	13
Diga Procross KTM Racing	KTM	72	(Belgium) Liam Everts	1, 5–11, 13–18
Diga Procross KTM Racing	KTM	104	(Germany) Jeremy Sydow	2–4
SM Action Racing Team Yuasa Battery	Gas Gas	80	(Italy) Andrea Adamo	All
iXS Hostettler MXGP Team	Yamaha	87	(Switzerland) Kevin Brumann	1–2, 4–11
Red Bull GasGas Factory Racing	Gas Gas	101	(Italy) Mattia Guadagnini	1–7
Red Bull GasGas Factory Racing	Gas Gas	516	(Germany) Simon Längenfelder	All
Raths Motorsports	KTM	104	(Germany) Jeremy Sydow	1, 5, 13–14
Raths Motorsports	KTM	309	(Spain) Guillem Farrés	9–11
Everest Racing Team	Kawasaki	181	(Belgium) Julian Vander Auwera	2
Everest Racing Team	Suzuki	632	(Belgium) Florent Lambillon	5, 7, 10–11, 13, 17
JD Gunnex KTM Racing Team	KTM	224	(Czech Republic) Jakub Terešák	4–11, 13–18
JD Gunnex KTM Racing Team	KTM	299	(Slovakia) Jaroslav Katriňák	13
Tem JP253	KTM	253	(Slovenia) Jan Pancar	1–2, 4–11, 13–18
JM Honda Racing	Honda	313	(Czech Republic) Petr Polák	1–2, 4–11, 13–14
PowerbyJJ Racing Team	Husqvarna	338	(Sweden) Filip Olsson	1–2, 4–6, 8, 10–11, 13–16
KTM Racestore MX2	KTM	368	(Spain) Samuel Nilsson	1–2, 4–5, 7
WZ Racing Team	KTM	401	(Austria) Marcel Stauffer	6, 10–11, 13–16
WZ Racing Team	KTM	403	(Denmark) Bastian Bøgh Damm	6, 8
WZ Racing Team	KTM	696	(Switzerland) Mike Gwerder	9
Honda 114 Motorsports	Honda	427	(Norway) Håkon Fredriksen	1–8, 10
KMP Honda Racing	Honda	491	(Germany) Paul Haberland	1–2, 5, 13–14
Wild Card Teams & Riders
Team	Constructor	No	Rider	Rounds
Hutten Metaal Yamaha	Yamaha	35	(Italy) Andrea Bonacorsi	5–6, 9, 18
Hutten Metaal Yamaha	Yamaha	44	(Netherlands) Rick Elzinga	5–6, 9, 18
Team AB Racing by Zweiradsport Schmitz	Husqvarna	36	(Germany) Nico Greutmann	11
Osička MX Team	KTM	45	(Slovakia) Tomáš Kohút	10–11, 13
SealMotomx / MotoCycle	KTM	48	(United Kingdom) Adam Collings	1, 14
Maggiora Park Racing Team	KTM	50	(Italy) Paolo Lugana	5
Marin & Fritid Husqvarna Scandinavia	Husqvarna	52	(Sweden) Albin Gerhardsson	14–16
MRT Racing Team KTM	KTM	53	(Italy) Valerio Lata	5, 7–8, 10–11
Ausio Racing Team	Yamaha	54	(Spain) Eric Tomás	9
KRTZ Motorsport	Gas Gas	55	(Czech Republic) Adam Dušek	13
Team WID Motorsport	KTM	57	(France) Pierre Goupillon	5, 10
Team WID Motorsport	KTM	320	(France) Dorian Werlé	10
ALS Motorsports	KTM	63	(Malaysia) Phattiphat Theerapongs Rattanap	12
ALS Motorsports	Kawasaki	65	(Malaysia) Dharwin Lingam	12
ALS Motorsports	Kawasaki	68	(Malaysia) Muhammad Hakimi Iroly	12
BaliMX Kawasaki GreenTech	Kawasaki	64	(Indonesia) Diva Ismayana	12
KTM SB Racing	KTM	67	(Spain) Yago Martínez	9
Schmicker Racing	KTM	71	(Germany) Maximilian Spies	5–6, 13
RPM Cross / ARRS Racing / D&A Cycles	Yamaha	81	(Argentina) Fermín Ciccimarra	3
Team VHR KTM Racing	KTM	100	(France) Scotty Verhaeghe	18
TBS Conversions Racing Team	KTM	122	(South Africa) Camden McLellan	6, 13
Córdoba Motos / WStandard Group	KTM	124	(Argentina) Jeremías Pascual	3
Mills Racing	KTM	127	(United Kingdom) Christopher Mills	14
Team Husqvarna Mezher	Husqvarna	133	(Argentina) Luciano Righi	3
	KTM	150	(Bulgaria) Hakan Halmi	18
Fantic Factory Team Maddii	Fantic	172	(Netherlands) Cas Valk	18
Fantic Factory Team Maddii	Fantic	302	(Norway) Cornelius Tøndel	18
BlomsMX Husqvarna	Husqvarna	180	(Sweden) Leopold Ambjörnsson	4–7, 14–17
GRT Impact KTM	KTM	184	(United Kingdom) James Carpenter	14
EasyMX powered by Young Motion	KTM	192	(Denmark) Glen Meier	2, 5–6, 10
Jumbo Husqvarna BT Racing Team	Husqvarna	193	(Belgium) Lucas Coenen	13
Jumbo Husqvarna BT Racing Team	Husqvarna	419	(Belgium) Sacha Coenen	13
Starling Cross Team	KTM	202	(Czech Republic) Adam Máj	13
RMS MX Team	Husqvarna	216	(Indonesia) Ananda Rigi Aditya	12
Laurense Motors	Kawasaki	242	(Netherlands) Kjell Verbruggen	14–16
Sahkar Racing	KTM	261	(Estonia) Jörgen-Matthias Talviku	6, 9
SC Sporthomes Husqvarna	Husqvarna	261	(Estonia) Jörgen-Matthias Talviku	14
Yamaha Speedcity BRC Acquamonte	Yamaha	272	(Portugal) André Sérgio	4
Becker Racing / Team Theiner	KTM	300	(Germany) Noah Ludwig	1–2, 5, 11, 13–14
Astra Honda Racing Team	Honda	325	(Indonesia) Delvintor Alfarizi	12
Team JMS Junior Motorsport	Honda	330	(Italy) Daniel Gimm	7
EastMX Gas Gas	Gas Gas	422	(Finland) Kimi Koskinen	16
426 Motorsports	KTM	426	(United Kingdom) Conrad Mewse	1–6, 8
New2 Project	KTM	431	(Czech Republic) Tomáš Pikart	13
Lelli Competición	KTM	432	(Argentina) Thomas Rivarola	3
Q Racing Team	Husqvarna	437	(Czech Republic) Martin Venhoda	13
JWR Honda Racing	Honda	474	(Netherlands) Twan Van Essen	15
	Gas Gas	522	(Bulgaria) Dimitar Grozdanov	18
Team Rizqy Motor Boss Mild	KTM	529	(Indonesia) Nakami Vidi Makarim	12
DAM Racing	KTM	563	(Belgium) Wesly Dieudonné	5
EB57	Husqvarna	570	(Latvia) Edvards Bidzāns	6
ASA United Gas Gas	Gas Gas	579	(United Kingdom) Bobby Bruce	15–16
MX Moduls	Yamaha	601	(Latvia) Mairis Pumpurs	6
	Yamaha	611	(Belgium) Pako Destercq	11, 13
HT Group Racing Team	Husqvarna	717	(Czech Republic) Jan Wagenknecht	13
MX-Handel Racing	Husqvarna	771	(Hungary) Kristóf Jakob	2, 5

==== Riders Championship ====
Pos	Nr	Rider	Bike	GBR (United Kingdom)		LOM		ARG (Argentina)		POR (Portugal)		TRE		LAT (Latvia)		ITA (Italy)		SAR (Sardinia)		ESP (Spain)		FRA (France)		GER (Germany)		IDN (Indonesia)		CZE (Czech Republic)		FLA (Flanders)		SWE (Sweden)		FIN (Finland)		CHA		TUR (Turkey)		Points
1	28	(France) Tom Vialle	KTM	2	3	2	21	2	1	1	2	1	1	5	3	5	1	2	1	1	1	1	3	1	Ret	1	1	10	2	7	4	1	2	2	1	2	1	1	1	758
2	93	(Belgium) Jago Geerts	Yamaha	4	2	1	1	1	2	9	1	3	Ret	1	1	1	2	1	2	9	2	2	2	2	2	2	5	3	1	2	1	2	1	1	7	3	7	2	2	754
3	516	(Germany) Simon Längenfelder	Gas Gas	1	1	7	2	13	5	13	9	8	10	4	12	6	3	6	7	2	3	3	5	9	4	3	2	2	3	3	9	4	3	9	5	4	10	5	5	596
4	24	(Norway) Kevin Horgmo	Kawasaki	7	9	6	8	5	13	8	3	12	5	2	4	12	7	5	4	4	13	4	4	6	5	5	7	4	5	Ret	3	3	5	6	6	10	5	9	9	527
5	198	(France) Thibault Benistant	Yamaha							7	8	5	3	3	10	15	8	3	3	5	7	8	1	3	1	4	3	1	4	4	8	6	9	5	8	1	2	10	4	510
6	74	(Netherlands) Kay de Wolf	Husqvarna	3	5	3	4	17	DNS	3	6	6	2	12	2	9	4							11	11	8	DNS	6	7	1	2	7	7	3	2	14	8	3	6	445
7	11	(Denmark) Mikkel Haarup	Kawasaki	8	7	8	7	4	3	2	4	2	6	Ret	9	7	5	4	11	10	5	7	20	4	3	15	14	8	8	Ret	Ret	5	8	8	11	5	12	13	Ret	443
8	80	(Italy) Andrea Adamo	Gas Gas	9	11	4	3	11	6	5	7	4	Ret	6	16	10	16	7	6	7	6	10	6	7	6	7	4	9	10	8	6	Ret	DNS	10	14	6	9	8	7	437
9	38	(France) Stephen Rubini	Honda	5	10	16	10	8	8	6	13	9	9	16	Ret	2	6	13	12	3	9	5	Ret	8	8	6	8	5	12	9	14	9	12	14	12	8	19	Ret	10	384
10	72	(Belgium) Liam Everts	KTM	DNS	DNS							14	13	9	15	4	13	10	8	6	4	6	7	DNS	DNS			7	9	5	7	8	10	7	4	7	6	6	12	310
11	253	(Slovenia) Jan Pancar	KTM	16	19	19	11			16	12	16	14	13	11	19	11	17	13	12	8	11	8	5	7			16	6	13	11	12	6	12	10	11	18	7	8	284
12	517	(Sweden) Isak Gifting	KTM	14	6	12	5	7	15	11	11	10	8	10	7	3	12	9	5	11	14	9	11	10	9															255
13	39	(Netherlands) Roan van de Moosdijk	Husqvarna	6	4	5	15	DNS	DNS																					6	5	13	4	4	3	13	4	4	3	214
14	33	(Netherlands) Kay Karssemakers	KTM	17	15	DNS	DNS							23	23	11	9	14	16	14	12	14	10	14	14	9	6	20	18	Ret	10	10	13	11	20	19	11	12	11	195
15	27	(France) Tom Guyon	KTM							17	15	21	16	18	14	8	Ret			Ret	11	12	9	12	12			11	11	Ret	DNS	11	11	13	9	9	3			179
16	101	(Italy) Mattia Guadagnini	Gas Gas	13	8	11	9	3	4	12	5	7	4	14	5	Ret	10																							172
17	427	(Norway) Håkon Fredriksen	Honda	10	20	9	6	12	10	Ret	10	20	15	8	8	18	15	8	Ret			Ret	Ret																	125
18	224	(Czech Republic) Jakub Terešák	KTM							18	17	29	26	25	Ret	13	17	15	15	18	Ret	17	16	18	16			17	22	10	15	18	16	16	16	12	13	16	14	119
19	426	(United Kingdom) Conrad Mewse	KTM	11	13	10	12	6	9	4	14	17	19	Ret	6			20	20																					113
20	104	(Germany) Jeremy Sydow	KTM	12	14	13	19	10	7	10	Ret	13	11															12	14	Ret	DNS									104
20	104	(Germany) Jeremy Sydow	Husqvarna											27	13																									104
21	313	(Czech Republic) Petr Polák	Honda	18	18	15	13			14	16	27	18	21	19	21	Ret	16	19	16	16	Ret	12	16	13			18	26	Ret	16									84
22	87	(Switzerland) Kevin Brumann	Yamaha	15	16	14	16			21	Ret	15	17	15	22	16	14	11	10	Ret	17	15	DNS	Ret	DNS															82
23	44	(Netherlands) Rick Elzinga	Yamaha									11	7	7	18					13	DNS																	Ret	DNS	49
24	912	(United Kingdom) Joel Rizzi	Yamaha													22	18	19	17									28	25	11	22	17	15	19	15	16	14			49
25	338	(Sweden) Filip Olsson	Husqvarna	Ret	Ret	18	Ret			15	19	28	Ret	Ret	Ret			Ret	14			Ret	17	Ret	19			26	24	12	Ret	15	17	Ret	DNS					43
26	309	(Spain) Guillem Farrés	KTM																	Ret	10	13	Ret	13	10															38
27	45	(Slovakia) Tomáš Kohút	KTM																			16	14	17	15			13	13											38
28	35	(Italy) Andrea Bonacorsi	Yamaha	DNS	DNS							18	22	17	25					8	20																	11	18	34
29	180	(Sweden) Leopold Ambjörnsson	Husqvarna							19	18	30	24	24	26	20	20													20	18	16	18	20	18	17	15			33
30	22	(Italy) Gianluca Facchetti	KTM	23	12	17	14	9	DNS																			21	Ret											32
31	52	(Sweden) Albin Gerhardsson	Husqvarna																											Ret	13	14	14	Ret	13					30
32	401	(Austria) Marcel Stauffer	KTM											Ret	Ret							Ret	DNS	15	17			27	20	14	Ret	Ret	21	15	19					26
33	53	(Italy) Valerio Lata	KTM									23	25			14	19	18	18			18	15	19	21															26
34	325	(Indonesia) Delvintor Alfarizi	Honda																							10	9													23
35	261	(Estonia) Jörgen-Matthias Talviku	KTM											Ret	17					17	15																			23
35	261	(Estonia) Jörgen-Matthias Talviku	Husqvarna																											Ret	12									23
36	403	(Denmark) Bastian Bøgh Damm	KTM											Ret	DNS			12	9																					21
37	125	(Finland) Emil Weckman	Honda	DNS	DNS																															15	16	15	17	21
38	216	(Indonesia) Ananda Rigi Aditya	Husqvarna																							13	10													19
39	57	(France) Pierre Goupillon	KTM									19	12									Ret	13																	19
40	242	(Netherlands) Kjell Verbruggen	Kawasaki																											15	19	19	19	18	17					19
41	300	(Germany) Noah Ludwig	KTM	19	17	21	20					DNS	DNS											20	20			Ret	17	16	20									19
42	64	(Indonesia) Diva Ismayana	Kawasaki																							11	13													18
43	529	(Indonesia) Nakami Vidi Makarim	Husqvarna																							12	12													18
44	65	(Malaysia) Dharwin Lingam	Kawasaki																							14	11													17
45	124	(Argentina) Jeremías Pascual	KTM					15	11																															16
46	133	(Argentina) Luciano Righi	Husqvarna					14	12																															16
47	302	(Norway) Cornelius Tøndel	Fantic																																			14	13	15
48	26	(Sweden) Tim Edberg	Yamaha	Ret	Ret	Ret	17							11	Ret																									14
49	122	(South Africa) Camden McLellan	KTM											Ret	24													14	15											13
50	81	(Argentina) Fermín Ciccimarra	Yamaha					16	14																															12
51	359	(France) Maxime Grau	Husqvarna																									15	16											11
52	632	(Belgium) Florent Lambillon	Suzuki									Ret	27			Ret	DNS					20	18	22	23			33	30							18	17			11
53	100	(France) Scotty Verhaeghe	KTM																																			18	15	9
54	98	(Spain) David Braceras	KTM																	15	18																			9
55	172	(Netherlands) Cas Valk	Fantic																																			17	16	9
56	184	(United Kingdom) James Carpenter	KTM																											18	17									7
57	368	(Spain) Samuel Nilsson	KTM	20	21	23	Ret			20	20	25	23			17	Ret																							7
58	192	(Denmark) Glen Meier	KTM			20	18					24	20	19	28							Ret	DNS																	7
59	422	(Finland) Kimi Koskinen	Gas Gas																															17	Ret					4
60	127	(United Kingdom) Christopher Mills	KTM																											17	23									4
61	150	(Bulgaria) Hakan Halmi	KTM																																			19	19	4
62	320	(France) Dorian Werlé	KTM																			19	19																	4
63	696	(Switzerland) Mike Gwerder	KTM																	19	19																			4
64	71	(Germany) Maximilian Spies	KTM									22	21	20	20													19	21											4
65	36	(Germany) Nico Greutmann	Husqvarna																					Ret	18															3
66	48	(United Kingdom) Adam Collings	KTM	22	23																									19	21									2
67	193	(Belgium) Lucas Coenen	Husqvarna																									22	19											2
68	522	(Bulgaria) Dimitar Grozdanov	Gas Gas																																			20	20	2
69	579	(United Kingdom) Bobby Bruce	Gas Gas																													20	20	DNS	DNS					2
70	54	(Spain) Eric Tomás	Yamaha																	20	21																			1
	491	(Germany) Paul Haberland	Honda	21	22	Ret	22					31	Ret															Ret	Ret	DNS	DNS									0
	611	(Belgium) Pako Destercq	Yamaha																					21	22			Ret	29											0
	272	(Portugal) André Sérgio	Yamaha							22	21																													0
	601	(Latvia) Mairis Pumpurs	Yamaha											22	21																									0
	330	(Italy) Daniel Gimm	Honda													Ret	21																							0
	771	(Hungary) Kristóf Jakob	Husqvarna			22	23					DNS	DNS																											0
	717	(Czech Republic) Jan Wagenknecht	Husqvarna																									25	23											0
	419	(Belgium) Sacha Coenen	Husqvarna																									23	Ret											0
	55	(Czech Republic) Adam Dušek	Gas Gas																									24	Ret											0
	570	(Latvia) Edvards Bidzāns	Husqvarna											26	27																									0
	50	(Italy) Paolo Lugana	KTM									26	Ret																											0
	202	(Czech Republic) Adam Máj	KTM																									31	27											0
	299	(Slovakia) Jaroslav Katriňák	KTM																									32	28											0
	437	(Czech Republic) Martin Venhoda	Husqvarna																									29	Ret											0
	431	(Czech Republic) Tomáš Pikart	KTM																									30	Ret											0
	563	(Belgium) Wesly Dieudonné	KTM									32	Ret																											0
	67	(Spain) Yago Martínez	KTM																	Ret	Ret																			0
	474	(Netherlands) Twan van Essen	Honda																													Ret	DNS							0
	181	(Belgium) Julian Vander Auwera	Kawasaki			DNS	DNS																																	0
	432	(Argentina) Thomas Rivarola	KTM					DNS	DNS																															0
	68	(Malaysia) Muhammad Hakimi Iroly	Kawasaki																							DNS	DNS													0
	63	(Malaysia) Phattiphat Theerapongs Rattanap	KTM																							DNS	DNS													0
Pos	Nr	Rider	Bike	GBR (United Kingdom)		LOM		ARG (Argentina)		POR (Portugal)		TRE		LAT (Latvia)		ITA (Italy)		SAR (Sardinia)		ESP (Spain)		FRA (France)		GER (Germany)		IDN (Indonesia)		CZE (Czech Republic)		FLA (Flanders)		SWE (Sweden)		FIN (Finland)		CHA		TUR (Turkey)		Points

==== Manufacturers Championship ====
Pos	Bike	GBR (United Kingdom)		LOM		ARG (Argentina)		POR (Portugal)		TRE		LAT (Latvia)		ITA (Italy)		SAR (Sardinia)		ESP (Spain)		FRA (France)		GER (Germany)		IDN (Indonesia)		CZE (Czech Republic)		FLA (Flanders)		SWE (Sweden)		FIN (Finland)		CHA		TUR (Turkey)		Points
1	Yamaha	4	2	1	1	1	2	7	1	3	3	1	1	1	2	1	2	5	2	2	1	2	1	2	3	1	1	2	1	2	1	1	7	1	2	2	2	808
2	KTM	2	3	2	5	2	1	1	2	1	1	5	3	3	1	2	1	1	1	1	3	1	7	1	1	7	2	5	4	1	2	2	1	2	1	1	1	797
3	Gas Gas	1	1	4	2	3	4	5	5	4	4	4	5	6	3	6	6	2	3	3	5	7	4	3	2	2	3	3	6	4	3	9	5	4	9	5	5	652
4	Kawasaki	7	7	6	7	4	3	2	3	2	5	2	4	7	5	4	4	4	5	4	4	4	3	5	7	4	5	15	3	3	5	6	6	5	5	9	9	601
5	Husqvarna	3	4	3	4	14	12	3	6	6	2	12	2	9	4	Ret	14			Ret	17	11	11	8	10	6	7	1	2	7	4	3	2	13	4	3	3	496
6	Honda	5	10	9	6	8	8	6	10	9	9	8	8	2	6	8	12	3	9	5	12	8	8	6	8	5	12	9	14	9	12	14	12	8	16	15	10	442
7	Fantic																																			14	13	15
8	Suzuki									Ret	27			Ret	DNS					20	18	22	23			33	30							18	17			11
Pos	Bike	GBR (United Kingdom)		LOM		ARG (Argentina)		POR (Portugal)		TRE		LAT (Latvia)		ITA (Italy)		SAR (Sardinia)		ESP (Spain)		FRA (France)		GER (Germany)		IDN (Indonesia)		CZE (Czech Republic)		FLA (Flanders)		SWE (Sweden)		FIN (Finland)		CHA		TUR (Turkey)		Points

== See also ==
- 2022 FIM Women's Motocross World Championship
- 2022 Motocross des Nations
- 2022 European Motocross Championship
