= 2024 Motocross des Nations =

2024 motocross race

The 2024 Motocross des Nations was a motocross race held on 5 and 6 October 2024 at Matterley Basin, United Kingdom. This was the third time that the event was held at this track.

France went into the event as the defending champions after winning their seventh title in 2023. Australia took their first title in the history of the event with the team of Hunter Lawrence, Kyle Webster and Jett Lawrence.

== Entry list ==
Start numbers were allocated based on the team finishes from the 2023 competition. This allocated number plates 1, 2 & 3 to France (1st), 4, 5 & 6 to Australia (2nd) and 7, 8 & 9 to Italy (3rd).

The final entry list was published on 3 October.

	Country	Nr	Rider	Class	Motorcycle
1	France	1	Romain Febvre	MXGP	Kawasaki
1	France	2	Tom Vialle	MX2	KTM
1	France	3	Maxime Renaux	Open	Yamaha
2	Australia	4	Hunter Lawrence	MXGP	Honda
2	Australia	5	Kyle Webster	MX2	Honda
2	Australia	6	Jett Lawrence	Open	Honda
3	Italy	7	Alberto Forato	MXGP	Honda
3	Italy	8	Andrea Adamo	MX2	KTM
3	Italy	9	Andrea Bonacorsi	Open	Yamaha
4	Germany	10	Ken Roczen	MXGP	Suzuki
4	Germany	11	Simon Längenfelder	MX2	Gas Gas
4	Germany	12	Max Nagl	Open	Honda
5	Belgium	13	Brent Van Doninck	MXGP	Honda
5	Belgium	14	Lucas Coenen	MX2	Husqvarna
5	Belgium	15	Jago Geerts	Open	Yamaha
6	Switzerland	16	Jeremy Seewer	MXGP	Kawasaki
6	Switzerland	17	Arnaud Tonus	MX2	Yamaha
6	Switzerland	18	Valentin Guillod	Open	Honda
7	Spain	19	Jorge Prado	MXGP	Gas Gas
7	Spain	20	Oriol Oliver	MX2	KTM
7	Spain	21	Rubén Fernández	Open	Honda
8	United States	22	Eli Tomac	MXGP	Yamaha
8	United States	23	Cooper Webb	MX2	Yamaha
8	United States	24	Aaron Plessinger	Open	KTM
9	Slovenia	25	Tim Gajser	MXGP	Honda
9	Slovenia	26	Jaka Peklaj	MX2	Husqvarna
9	Slovenia	27	Jan Pancar	Open	KTM
10	United Kingdom	28	Tommy Searle	MXGP	Kawasaki
10	United Kingdom	29	Max Anstie	MX2	Yamaha
10	United Kingdom	30	Conrad Mewse	Open	Honda
11	Estonia	31	Gert Krestinov	MXGP	Honda
11	Estonia	32	Tanel Leok	MX2	Husqvarna
11	Estonia	33	Harri Kullas	Open	KTM
12	Latvia	34	Mairis Pumpurs	MXGP	Husqvarna
12	Latvia	35	Kārlis Reišulis	MX2	Yamaha
12	Latvia	36	Edvards Bidzāns	Open	Honda
13	South Africa	37	Cameron Durow	MXGP	KTM
13	South Africa	38	Camden McLellan	MX2	Triumph
13	South Africa	39	Tristan Purdon	Open	Husqvarna
14	New Zealand	40	Hamish Harwood	MXGP	KTM
14	New Zealand	41	Brodie Connolly	MX2	Honda
14	New Zealand	42	Josiah Natzke	Open	KTM
15	Czech Republic	43	Petr Polák	MXGP	Yamaha
15	Czech Republic	44	Julius Mikula	MX2	KTM
15	Czech Republic	45	Jakub Terešák	Open	Husqvarna
16	Brazil	46	Enzo Lopes	MXGP	Yamaha
16	Brazil	47	Bernardo Tibúrcio	MX2	Honda
16	Brazil	48	Fábio Santos	Open	Yamaha
17	Finland	49	Emil Weckman	MXGP	KTM
17	Finland	50	Sampo Rainio	MX2	KTM
17	Finland	51	Miro Varjonen	Open	KTM
18	Netherlands	52	Jeffrey Herlings	MXGP	KTM
18	Netherlands	53	Kay de Wolf	MX2	Husqvarna
18	Netherlands	54	Glenn Coldenhoff	Open	Fantic
19	Sweden	55	Isak Gifting	MXGP	Yamaha
19	Sweden	56	Arvid Lüning	MX2	Gas Gas
19	Sweden	57	Alvin Östlund	Open	Honda
20	Portugal	58	Luís Outeiro	MXGP	Yamaha
20	Portugal	59	Sandro Lobo	MX2	Yamaha
20	Portugal	60	Paulo Alberto	Open	Yamaha
21	Slovakia	61	Tomáš Kohút	MXGP	KTM
21	Slovakia	62	Jaroslav Katriňák	MX2	Gas Gas
21	Slovakia	63	Pavol Repčák	Open	KTM
22	Lithuania	64	Domantas Jazdauskas	MXGP	KTM
22	Lithuania	65	Grantas Lengvinas	MX2	Yamaha
22	Lithuania	66	Erlandas Mackonis	Open	KTM
23	FIM Latin America	67	(Argentina) Joaquín Poli	MXGP	Kawasaki
23	FIM Latin America	68	(Dominican Republic) Franklin Noguera	MX2	Gas Gas
23	FIM Latin America	69	(Bolivia) Marco Antezana	Open	KTM
24	Canada	70	Jess Pettis	MXGP	KTM
24	Canada	71	Kaven Benoit	MX2	KTM
24	Canada	72	Dylan Wright	Open	Honda
25	Chile	73	Sergio Villaronga	MXGP	Honda
25	Chile	74	Benjamin Garíb	MX2	Kawasaki
25	Chile	75	Diego Rojas	Open	Yamaha
26	(Republic of Ireland) Ireland	76	Martin Barr	MXGP	Honda
26	(Republic of Ireland) Ireland	77	Cole McCullough	MX2	Fantic
26	(Republic of Ireland) Ireland	78	Jason Meara	Open	Gas Gas
27	Croatia	85	Matija Kelava	MXGP	Yamaha
27	Croatia	86	Matija Šterpin	MX2	Yamaha
27	Croatia	87	David Petanjek	Open	Husqvarna
28	Iceland	88	Máni Freyr Pétursson	MXGP	Fantic
28	Iceland	89	Eiður Orri Pálmarsson	MX2	Yamaha
28	Iceland	90	Alexander Adam Kuc	Open	Gas Gas
29	Poland	94	Jakub Barczewski	MXGP	Gas Gas
29	Poland	95	Olaf Włodarczak	MX2	KTM
29	Poland	96	Jakub Kowalski	Open	Gas Gas
30	Greece	106	Panagiotis Kouzis	MXGP	TM
30	Greece	107	Dimitrios Bakas	MX2	Yamaha
30	Greece	108	Christos Kotoulas	Open	KTM
31	Norway	109	Kevin Horgmo	MXGP	Honda
31	Norway	110	Sander Agard-Michelsen	MX2	Yamaha
31	Norway	111	Cornelius Tøndel	Open	KTM
32	Japan	112	Yusuke Watanabe	MXGP	Yamaha
32	Japan	113	Haruki Yokoyama	MX2	Honda
32	Japan	114	Yuki Okura	Open	Honda
33	Denmark	115	Mads Fredsøe	MXGP	Gas Gas
33	Denmark	116	Mikkel Haarup	MX2	Triumph
33	Denmark	117	Nicolai Skovbjerg	Open	Yamaha
34	Romania	118	Krisztian Tompa	MXGP	Yamaha
34	Romania	119	Zoltan Ördög	MX2	KTM
34	Romania	120	George Căbăl	Open	KTM
35	Austria	124	Marcel Stauffer	MXGP	KTM
35	Austria	125	Michael Sandner	MX2	KTM
35	Austria	126	Michael Kratzer	Open	Honda
36	Venezuela	127	Lorenzo Locurcio	MXGP	Husqvarna
36	Venezuela	128	Daniel Bortolin	MX2	Husqvarna
36	Venezuela	129	Anthony Rodríguez	Open	Husqvarna

== Qualifying Races ==
Qualifying was run on a class by class basis. Top 19 countries after qualifying went directly to the main Motocross des Nations races. The remaining countries went to a smaller final. Best 2 scores counted.

=== MXGP ===
Place	Nr	Rider	Motorcycle	Laps	Gap
1	19	(Spain) Jorge Prado	Gas Gas	11	
2	25	(Slovenia) Tim Gajser	Honda	11	+5.630
3	1	(France) Romain Febvre	Kawasaki	11	+21.471
4	4	(Australia) Hunter Lawrence	Honda	11	+23.964
5	52	(Netherlands) Jeffrey Herlings	KTM	11	+25.547
6	10	(Germany) Ken Roczen	Suzuki	11	+31.869
7	22	(United States) Eli Tomac	Yamaha	11	+38.105
8	7	(Italy) Alberto Forato	Honda	11	+46.176
9	55	(Sweden) Isak Gifting	Yamaha	11	+1:04.284
10	16	(Switzerland) Jeremy Seewer	Kawasaki	11	+1:05.276
11	109	(Norway) Kevin Horgmo	Honda	11	+1:14.831
12	124	(Austria) Marcel Stauffer	KTM	11	+1:29.397
13	70	(Canada) Jess Pettis	KTM	11	+1:35.700
14	40	(New Zealand) Hamish Harwood	KTM	11	+1:37.884
15	28	(United Kingdom) Tommy Searle	Kawasaki	11	+1:46.651
16	115	(Denmark) Mads Fredsøe	Gas Gas	11	+1:51.432
17	49	(Finland) Emil Weckman	KTM	11	+1:54.596
18	43	(Czech Republic) Petr Polák	Yamaha	11	+1:56.055
19	13	(Belgium) Brent Van Doninck	Honda	11	+2:15.100
20	76	(Republic of Ireland) Martin Barr	Honda	10	+1 Lap
21	61	(Slovakia) Tomáš Kohút	KTM	10	+1 Lap
22	46	(Brazil) Enzo Lopes	Yamaha	10	+1 Lap
23	127	(Venezuela) Lorenzo Locurcio	Husqvarna	10	+1 Lap
24	31	(Estonia) Gert Krestinov	Honda	10	+1 Lap
25	34	(Latvia) Mairis Pumpurs	Husqvarna	10	+1 Lap
26	58	(Portugal) Luís Outeiro	Yamaha	10	+1 Lap
27	67	(Argentina) Joaquín Poli	Kawasaki	10	+1 Lap
28	118	(Romania) Krisztian Tompa	Yamaha	10	+1 Lap
29	85	(Croatia) Matija Kelava	Yamaha	10	+1 Lap
30	73	(Chile) Sergio Villaronga	Honda	10	+1 Lap
31	112	(Japan) Yusuke Watanabe	Yamaha	10	+1 Lap
32	106	(Greece) Panagiotis Kouzis	TM	9	+2 Laps
33	64	(Lithuania) Domantas Jazdauskas	KTM	9	+2 Laps
34	94	(Poland) Jakub Barczewski	Gas Gas	6	Did Not Finish
35	88	(Iceland) Máni Freyr Pétursson	Fantic	3	Did Not Finish
36	37	(South Africa) Cameron Durow	KTM	0	Did Not Finish

=== MX2 ===
Place	Nr	Rider	Motorcycle	Laps	Gap
1	2	(France) Tom Vialle	KTM	11	
2	14	(Belgium) Lucas Coenen	Husqvarna	11	+9.653
3	11	(Germany) Simon Längenfelder	Gas Gas	11	+16.742
4	29	(United Kingdom) Max Anstie	Yamaha	11	+22.311
5	53	(Netherlands) Kay de Wolf	Husqvarna	11	+26.730
6	38	(South Africa) Camden McLellan	Triumph	11	+42.113
7	23	(United States) Cooper Webb	Yamaha	11	+47.414
8	116	(Denmark) Mikkel Haarup	Triumph	11	+47.931
9	20	(Spain) Oriol Oliver	KTM	11	+58.805
10	8	(Italy) Andrea Adamo	KTM	11	+58.966
11	44	(Czech Republic) Julius Mikula	KTM	11	+1:22.269
12	17	(Switzerland) Arnaud Tonus	Yamaha	11	+1:33.467
13	5	(Australia) Kyle Webster	Honda	11	+1:37.115
14	113	(Japan) Haruki Yokoyama	Honda	11	+1:40.600
15	74	(Chile) Benjamin Garíb	Kawasaki	11	+1:42.950
16	47	(Brazil) Bernardo Tibúrcio	Honda	11	+1:44.012
17	32	(Estonia) Tanel Leok	Husqvarna	11	+1:44.551
18	41	(New Zealand) Brodie Connolly	Honda	11	+1:52.492
19	35	(Latvia) Kārlis Reišulis	Yamaha	11	+2:01.199
20	110	(Norway) Sander Agard-Michelsen	Yamaha	11	+2:04.713
21	125	(Austria) Michael Sandner	KTM	11	+2:06.700
22	50	(Finland) Sampo Rainio	KTM	10	+1 Lap
23	71	(Canada) Kaven Benoit	KTM	10	+1 Lap
24	77	(Republic of Ireland) Cole McCullough	Fantic	10	+1 Lap
25	62	(Slovakia) Jaroslav Katriňák	Gas Gas	10	+1 Lap
26	128	(Venezuela) Daniel Bortolin	Husqvarna	10	+1 Lap
27	56	(Sweden) Arvid Lüning	Gas Gas	10	+1 Lap
28	26	(Slovenia) Jaka Peklaj	Husqvarna	10	+1 Lap
29	68	(Dominican Republic) Franklin Noguera	Gas Gas	10	+1 Lap
30	59	(Portugal) Sandro Lobo	Yamaha	10	+1 Lap
31	119	(Romania) Zoltan Ördög	KTM	10	+1 Lap
32	86	(Croatia) Matija Šterpin	Yamaha	10	+1 Lap
33	95	(Poland) Olaf Włodarczak	KTM	9	+2 Laps
34	107	(Greece) Dimitrios Bakas	KTM	9	+2 Laps
35	89	(Iceland) Eiður Orri Pálmarsson	Yamaha	7	Did Not Finish
	65	(Lithuania) Grantas Lengvinas	Yamaha	0	Did Not Start

=== Open ===
Place	Nr	Rider	Motorcycle	Laps	Gap
1	6	(Australia) Jett Lawrence	Honda	11	
2	21	(Spain) Rubén Fernández	Honda	11	+6.145
3	3	(France) Maxime Renaux	Yamaha	11	+24.348
4	30	(United Kingdom) Conrad Mewse	Honda	11	+38.368
5	9	(Italy) Andrea Bonacorsi	Yamaha	11	+45.036
6	24	(United States) Aaron Plessinger	KTM	11	+46.068
7	111	(Norway) Cornelius Tøndel	KTM	11	+56.545
8	27	(Slovenia) Jan Pancar	KTM	11	+58.669
9	15	(Belgium) Jago Geerts	Yamaha	11	+1:00.169
10	48	(Brazil) Fábio Santos	Yamaha	11	+1:04.762
11	12	(Germany) Max Nagl	Honda	11	+1:06.752
12	18	(Switzerland) Valentin Guillod	Honda	11	+1:14.353
13	72	(Canada) Dylan Wright	Honda	11	+1:15.911
14	33	(Estonia) Harri Kullas	KTM	11	+1:18.097
15	45	(Czech Republic) Jakub Terešák	Husqvarna	11	+1:22.678
16	126	(Austria) Michael Kratzer	Honda	11	+1:34.317
17	114	(Japan) Yuki Okura	Honda	11	+1:41.853
18	36	(Latvia) Edvards Bidzāns	Honda	11	+1:44.818
19	39	(South Africa) Tristan Purdon	Husqvarna	11	+1:45.124
20	63	(Slovakia) Pavol Repčák	KTM	11	+2:03.711
21	78	(Republic of Ireland) Jason Meara	Gas Gas	11	+2:05.062
22	129	(Venezuela) Anthony Rodríguez	Husqvarna	11	+2:10.202
23	60	(Portugal) Paulo Alberto	Yamaha	11	+2:11.807
24	54	(Netherlands) Glenn Coldenhoff	Fantic	10	Did Not Finish
25	42	(New Zealand) Josiah Natzke	KTM	10	+1 Lap
26	117	(Denmark) Nicolai Skovbjerg	Yamaha	10	+1 Lap
27	120	(Romania) George Căbăl	KTM	10	+1 Lap
28	69	(Bolivia) Marco Antezana	KTM	10	+1 Lap
29	51	(Finland) Miro Varjonen	KTM	10	+1 Lap
30	66	(Lithuania) Erlandas Mackonis	KTM	10	+1 Lap
31	75	(Chile) Diego Rojas	Yamaha	10	+1 Lap
32	96	(Poland) Jakub Kowalski	Gas Gas	10	+1 Lap
33	87	(Croatia) David Petanjek	Husqvarna	9	+2 Laps
34	90	(Iceland) Alexander Adam Kuc	Gas Gas	9	+2 Laps
35	57	(Sweden) Alvin Östlund	Honda	3	Did Not Finish
36	108	(Greece) Christos Kotoulas	KTM	0	Did Not Finish

=== Qualification Standings ===
- Qualified Nations

Place	Nation	Points
1	Spain	3
2	France	4
3	Australia	5
4	United Kingdom	8
5	Germany	9
6	Netherlands	10
7	Slovenia	10
8	Belgium	11
9	United States	13
10	Italy	13
11	Norway	18
12	Switzerland	22
13	Denmark	24
14	South Africa	25
15	Czech Republic	26
16	Brazil	26
17	Canada	26
18	Austria	28
19	Estonia	31

- Nations admitted to the B-Final

Place	Nation	Points
20	Japan	31
21	New Zealand	32
22	Sweden	36
23	Latvia	37
24	Finland	39
25	Ireland	41
26	Slovakia	41
27	Venezuela	45
28	Chile	45
29	Portugal	49
30	FIM Latin America	55
31	Romania	55
32	Croatia	61

- Non-Qualified Nations

Place	Nation	Points
33	Lithuania	63
34	Poland	65
35	Greece	66
36	Iceland	69

== B-Final ==
The B-Final is for the nations who finished 20th-32nd in qualifying. The top nation from the B-Final qualify for the main Motocross des Nations races, the remaining are eliminated. Best 2 scores for each nation counts.

=== Race ===
Place	Nr	Rider	Motorcycle	Laps	Gap
1	35	(Latvia) Kārlis Reišulis	Yamaha	11	
2	55	(Sweden) Isak Gifting	Yamaha	11	+8.602
3	40	(New Zealand) Hamish Harwood	KTM	11	+24.458
4	61	(Slovakia) Tomáš Kohút	KTM	11	+28.880
5	129	(Venezuela) Anthony Rodríguez	Husqvarna	11	+31.052
6	113	(Japan) Haruki Yokoyama	Honda	11	+36.213
7	78	(Republic of Ireland) Jason Meara	Gas Gas	11	+36.861
8	49	(Finland) Emil Weckman	KTM	11	+37.352
9	34	(Latvia) Mairis Pumpurs	Husqvarna	11	+39.278
10	57	(Sweden) Alvin Östlund	Honda	11	+40.945
11	36	(Latvia) Edvards Bidzāns	Honda	11	+42.062
12	76	(Republic of Ireland) Martin Barr	Honda	11	+52.986
13	42	(New Zealand) Josiah Natzke	KTM	11	+54.040
14	58	(Portugal) Luís Outeiro	Yamaha	11	+54.752
15	41	(New Zealand) Brodie Connolly	Honda	11	+1:07.729
16	127	(Venezuela) Lorenzo Locurcio	Husqvarna	11	+1:08.864
17	67	(Argentina) Joaquín Poli	Kawasaki	11	+1:09.176
18	62	(Slovakia) Jaroslav Katriňák	Gas Gas	11	+1:19.325
19	118	(Romania) Krisztian Tompa	Yamaha	11	+1:29.988
20	60	(Portugal) Paulo Alberto	Yamaha	11	+1:35.136
21	51	(Finland) Miro Varjonen	KTM	11	+1:39.534
22	75	(Chile) Diego Rojas	Yamaha	11	+1:49.335
23	50	(Finland) Sampo Rainio	KTM	11	+1:52.584
24	77	(Republic of Ireland) Cole McCullough	Fantic	11	+1:54.174
25	85	(Croatia) Matija Kelava	Yamaha	11	+2:00.482
26	73	(Chile) Sergio Villaronga	Honda	10	+1 Lap
27	112	(Japan) Yusuke Watanabe	Yamaha	10	+1 Lap
28	87	(Croatia) David Petanjek	Husqvarna	10	+1 Lap
29	119	(Romania) Zoltan Ördög	KTM	10	+1 Lap
30	59	(Portugal) Sandro Lobo	Yamaha	10	+1 Lap
31	86	(Croatia) Matija Šterpin	Yamaha	10	+1 Lap
32	69	(Bolivia) Marco Antezana	KTM	10	+1 Lap
33	56	(Sweden) Arvid Lüning	Gas Gas	8	Did Not Finish
34	68	(Dominican Republic) Franklin Noguera	Gas Gas	4	Did Not Finish
35	74	(Chile) Benjamin Garíb	Kawasaki	3	Did Not Finish
36	120	(Romania) George Căbăl	KTM	2	Did Not Finish
37	63	(Slovakia) Pavol Repčák	KTM	0	Did Not Finish
38	114	(Japan) Yuki Okura	Honda	0	Did Not Finish
39	128	(Venezuela) Daniel Bortolin	Husqvarna	0	Did Not Finish

=== B-Final Standings ===
- Latvia qualify for the main races.

Place	Nation	Points
1	Latvia	10
2	Sweden	12
3	New Zealand	16
4	Ireland	19
5	Venezuela	21
6	Slovakia	22
7	Finland	29
8	Japan	33
9	Portugal	34
10	Chile	48
11	Romania	48
12	FIM Latin America	49
13	Croatia	53

== Motocross des Nations races ==
The main Motocross des Nations races consist of 3 races which combine two classes together in each. Lowest score wins with each nation allowed to drop their worst score after the final race.

=== MXGP+MX2 ===
Place	Nr	Rider	Motorcycle	Laps	Gap
1	25	(Slovenia) Tim Gajser	Honda	16	
2	22	(United States) Eli Tomac	Yamaha	16	+6.810
3	1	(France) Romain Febvre	Kawasaki	16	+8.978
4	19	(Spain) Jorge Prado	Gas Gas	16	+18.038
5	52	(Netherlands) Jeffrey Herlings	KTM	16	+28.371
6	53	(Netherlands) Kay de Wolf	Husqvarna	16	+30.159
7	16	(Switzerland) Jeremy Seewer	Kawasaki	16	+31.445
8	4	(Australia) Hunter Lawrence	Honda	16	+42.032
9	7	(Italy) Alberto Forato	Honda	16	+51.153
10	10	(Germany) Ken Roczen	Suzuki	16	+58.580
11	5	(Australia) Kyle Webster	Honda	16	+1:06.146
12	35	(Latvia) Kārlis Reišulis	Yamaha	16	+1:16.083
13	116	(Denmark) Mikkel Haarup	Triumph	16	+1:17.726
14	13	(Belgium) Brent Van Doninck	Honda	16	+1:21.562
15	46	(Brazil) Enzo Lopes	Yamaha	16	+1:28.345
16	38	(South Africa) Camden McLellan	Triumph	16	+1:36.277
17	23	(United States) Cooper Webb	Yamaha	16	+1:36.655
18	11	(Germany) Simon Längenfelder	Gas Gas	16	+1:41.980
19	124	(Austria) Marcel Stauffer	KTM	16	+1:42.465
20	109	(Norway) Kevin Horgmo	Honda	16	+1:49.020
21	8	(Italy) Andrea Adamo	KTM	16	+1:58.294
22	2	(France) Tom Vialle	KTM	16	+2:05.056
23	28	(United Kingdom) Tommy Searle	Kawasaki	16	+2:10.338
24	70	(Canada) Jess Pettis	KTM	16	+2:12.586
25	44	(Czech Republic) Julius Mikula	KTM	15	+1 Lap
26	20	(Spain) Oriol Oliver	KTM	15	+1 Lap
27	17	(Switzerland) Arnaud Tonus	Yamaha	15	+1 Lap
28	115	(Denmark) Mads Fredsøe	Gas Gas	15	+1 Lap
29	43	(Czech Republic) Petr Polák	Yamaha	15	+1 Lap
30	34	(Latvia) Mairis Pumpurs	Husqvarna	15	+1 Lap
31	32	(Estonia) Tanel Leok	Husqvarna	15	+1 Lap
32	47	(Brazil) Bernardo Tibúrcio	Honda	15	+1 Lap
33	31	(Estonia) Gert Krestinov	Honda	15	+1 Lap
34	26	(Slovenia) Jaka Peklaj	Husqvarna	15	+1 Lap
35	110	(Norway) Sander Agard-Michelsen	Yamaha	15	+1 Lap
36	71	(Canada) Kaven Benoit	KTM	15	+1 Lap
37	37	(South Africa) Cameron Durow	KTM	15	+1 Lap
38	125	(Austria) Michael Sandner	KTM	15	+1 Lap
39	14	(Belgium) Lucas Coenen	Husqvarna	11	Did Not Finish
40	29	(United Kingdom) Max Anstie	Yamaha	7	Did Not Finish

=== Nations standings after Race 1 ===
Place	Nation	Points
1	Netherlands	11
2	United States	19
3	Australia	19
4	France	25
5	Germany	28
6	Spain	30
7	Italy	30
8	Switzerland	34
9	Slovenia	35
10	Denmark	41
11	Latvia	42
12	Brazil	47
13	Belgium	53
14	South Africa	53
15	Czech Republic	54
16	Norway	55
17	Austria	57
18	Canada	60
19	United Kingdom	63
20	Estonia	64

=== MX2+Open ===
Place	Nr	Rider	Motorcycle	Laps	Gap
1	6	(Australia) Jett Lawrence	Honda	16	
2	21	(Spain) Rubén Fernández	Honda	16	+7.919
3	11	(Germany) Simon Längenfelder	Gas Gas	16	+10.438
4	3	(France) Maxime Renaux	Yamaha	16	+12.162
5	53	(Netherlands) Kay de Wolf	Husqvarna	16	+29.029
6	30	(United Kingdom) Conrad Mewse	Honda	16	+35.536
7	24	(United States) Aaron Plessinger	KTM	16	+37.007
8	35	(Latvia) Kārlis Reišulis	Yamaha	16	+41.572
9	23	(United States) Cooper Webb	Yamaha	16	+43.286
10	116	(Denmark) Mikkel Haarup	Triumph	16	+43.325
11	15	(Belgium) Jago Geerts	Yamaha	16	+50.883
12	2	(France) Tom Vialle	KTM	16	+57.772
13	20	(Spain) Oriol Oliver	KTM	16	+59.648
14	111	(Norway) Cornelius Tøndel	KTM	16	+1:01.482
15	27	(Slovenia) Jan Pancar	KTM	16	+1:08.892
16	9	(Italy) Andrea Bonacorsi	Yamaha	16	+1:11.630
17	44	(Czech Republic) Julius Mikula	KTM	16	+1:13.314
18	54	(Netherlands) Glenn Coldenhoff	Fantic	16	+1:21.266
19	5	(Australia) Kyle Webster	Honda	16	+1:23.654
20	8	(Italy) Andrea Adamo	KTM	16	+1:29.473
21	45	(Czech Republic) Jakub Terešák	Husqvarna	16	+1:42.813
22	33	(Estonia) Harri Kullas	KTM	16	+1:52.049
23	72	(Canada) Dylan Wright	Honda	16	+1:54.639
24	39	(South Africa) Tristan Purdon	Husqvarna	16	+2:13.027
25	12	(Germany) Max Nagl	Honda	15	+1 Lap
26	48	(Brazil) Fábio Santos	Yamaha	15	+1 Lap
27	126	(Austria) Michael Kratzer	Honda	15	+1 Lap
28	36	(Latvia) Edvards Bidzāns	Honda	15	+1 Lap
29	17	(Switzerland) Arnaud Tonus	Yamaha	15	+1 Lap
30	32	(Estonia) Tanel Leok	Husqvarna	15	+1 Lap
31	110	(Norway) Sander Agard-Michelsen	Yamaha	15	+1 Lap
32	117	(Denmark) Nicolai Skovbjerg	Yamaha	15	+1 Lap
33	47	(Brazil) Bernardo Tibúrcio	Honda	15	+1 Lap
34	125	(Austria) Michael Sandner	KTM	15	+1 Lap
35	71	(Canada) Kaven Benoit	KTM	15	+1 Lap
36	26	(Slovenia) Jaka Peklaj	Husqvarna	15	+1 Lap
37	38	(South Africa) Camden McLellan	Triumph	7	Did Not Finish
38	18	(Switzerland) Valentin Guillod	Honda	0	Did Not Finish
	14	(Belgium) Lucas Coenen	Husqvarna	0	Did Not Start
	29	(United Kingdom) Max Anstie	Yamaha	0	Did Not Start

=== Nations standings after Race 2 ===
Place	Nation	Points
1	Netherlands	34
2	United States	35
3	Australia	39
4	France	41
5	Spain	45
6	Germany	56
7	Italy	66
8	Latvia	78
9	Denmark	83
10	Slovenia	86
11	Czech Republic	92
12	Norway	100
13	Switzerland	101
14	Brazil	106
15	South Africa	114
16	Estonia	116
17	Austria	118
18	Canada	118
19	Belgium	64
20	United Kingdom	69

=== MXGP+Open ===
Place	Nr	Rider	Motorcycle	Laps	Gap
1	25	(Slovenia) Tim Gajser	Honda	16	
2	6	(Australia) Jett Lawrence	Honda	16	+0.459
3	22	(United States) Eli Tomac	Yamaha	16	+17.172
4	4	(Australia) Hunter Lawrence	Honda	16	+18.129
5	52	(Netherlands) Jeffrey Herlings	KTM	16	+20.434
6	16	(Switzerland) Jeremy Seewer	Kawasaki	16	+1:00.988
7	7	(Italy) Alberto Forato	Honda	16	+1:09.220
8	24	(United States) Aaron Plessinger	KTM	16	+1:12.390
9	3	(France) Maxime Renaux	Yamaha	16	+1:17.022
10	10	(Germany) Ken Roczen	Suzuki	16	+1:20.261
11	46	(Brazil) Enzo Lopes	Yamaha	16	+1:31.002
12	21	(Spain) Rubén Fernández	Honda	16	+1:31.229
13	72	(Canada) Dylan Wright	Honda	16	+1:51.336
14	19	(Spain) Jorge Prado	Gas Gas	16	+1:53.651
15	54	(Netherlands) Glenn Coldenhoff	Fantic	16	+1:55.118
16	27	(Slovenia) Jan Pancar	KTM	16	+1:58.867
17	18	(Switzerland) Valentin Guillod	Honda	16	+2:01.225
18	9	(Italy) Andrea Bonacorsi	Yamaha	16	+2:07.510
19	30	(United Kingdom) Conrad Mewse	Honda	16	+2:12.589
20	15	(Belgium) Jago Geerts	Yamaha	16	+2:23.206
21	12	(Germany) Max Nagl	Honda	15	+1 Lap
22	70	(Canada) Jess Pettis	KTM	15	+1 Lap
23	45	(Czech Republic) Jakub Terešák	Husqvarna	15	+1 Lap
24	33	(Estonia) Harri Kullas	KTM	15	+1 Lap
25	28	(United Kingdom) Tommy Searle	Kawasaki	15	+1 Lap
26	36	(Latvia) Edvards Bidzāns	Honda	15	+1 Lap
27	115	(Denmark) Mads Fredsøe	Gas Gas	15	+1 Lap
28	39	(South Africa) Tristan Purdon	Husqvarna	15	+1 Lap
29	34	(Latvia) Mairis Pumpurs	Husqvarna	15	+1 Lap
30	48	(Brazil) Fábio Santos	Yamaha	15	+1 Lap
31	117	(Denmark) Nicolai Skovbjerg	Yamaha	15	+1 Lap
32	37	(South Africa) Cameron Durow	Yamaha	15	+1 Lap
33	43	(Czech Republic) Petr Polák	Yamaha	14	+2 Laps
34	1	(France) Romain Febvre	Kawasaki	13	Did Not Finish
35	31	(Estonia) Gert Krestinov	Honda	13	+3 Laps
36	111	(Norway) Cornelius Tøndel	KTM	8	Did Not Finish
37	126	(Austria) Michael Kratzer	Honda	7	Did Not Finish
38	109	(Norway) Kevin Horgmo	Honda	4	Did Not Finish
39	13	(Belgium) Brent Van Doninck	Honda	3	Did Not Finish
40	124	(Austria) Marcel Stauffer	KTM	1	Did Not Finish

=== Nations standings after Race 3 ===
Place	Nation	Points
1	Australia	26
2	United States	29
3	Netherlands	36
4	Spain	45
5	France	50
6	Germany	62
7	Slovenia	67
8	Italy	70
9	Switzerland	86
10	Latvia	103
11	Denmark	109
12	United Kingdom	113
13	Brazil	114
14	Czech Republic	115
15	Canada	117
16	Belgium	123
17	Norway	136
18	South Africa	137
19	Estonia	140
20	Austria	155

== Final standings ==
Place	Nation	Points	Total	Change
1	Australia	1 + 2 + 4 + 8 + 11	26	+1
2	United States	2 + 3 + 7 + 8 + 9	29	+6
3	Netherlands	5 + 5 + 5 + 6 + 15	36	+16
4	Spain	2 + 4 + 12 + 13 + 14	45	+3
5	France	3 + 4 + 9 + 12 + 22	50	-4
6	Germany	3 + 10 + 10 + 18 + 21	62	-2
7	Slovenia	1 + 1 + 15 + 16 + 34	67	+2
8	Italy	7 + 9 + 16 + 18 + 20	70	-5
9	Switzerland	6 + 7 + 17 + 27 + 29	86	-3
10	Latvia	8 + 12 + 26 + 28 + 29	103	+2
11	Denmark	10 + 13 + 27 + 28 + 31	109	*
12	United Kingdom	6 + 19 + 23 + 25 + 40	113	-2
13	Brazil	11 + 15 + 26 + 30 + 32	114	+4
14	Czech Republic	17 + 21 + 23 + 25 + 29	115	+1
15	Canada	13 + 22 + 23 + 24 + 35	117	+10
16	Belgium	11 + 14 + 20 + 39 + 39	123	-11
17	Norway	14 + 20 + 31 + 35 + 36	136	-1
18	South Africa	16 + 24 + 28 + 32 + 37	137	-5
19	Estonia	22 + 24 + 30 + 31 + 33	140	-8
20	Austria	19 + 27 + 34 + 37 + 38	155	*
21	Sweden			-1
22	New Zealand			-8
23	Ireland			+4
24	Venezuela			*
25	Slovakia			-3
26	Finland			-8
27	Japan			*
28	Portugal			-7
29	Chile			-3
30	Romania			*
31	FIM Latin America			-7
32	Croatia			-2
33	Lithuania			-10
34	Poland			-1
35	Greece			+2
36	Iceland			-5
