= Jan Pancar =

Slovenian motocross racer

- Nationality: Slovenian
- Born: 18 May 2000 (age 26); Čatež, Slovenia
- Current team: TEM JP253 KTM Racing Team
- Bike number: 253

Jan Pancar (born 18 May 2000) is a Slovenian professional Motocross racer. Pancar has competed in the MXGP class of the Motocross World Championship since the 2024 season, having previously competed in the MX2 class full-time from 2018 onwards.

Throughout most of his world championship career, Pancar has competed as a privateer for his small, family-run team. Despite this, he has regularly been competitive against his better funded competitors, recording several top-ten overall finishes in the MXGP class.

Pancar has represented Slovenia at the Motocross des Nations eight times, including during the 2025 edition, where the team recorded its highest overall result to date.

Alongside competing in the world championship, Pancar has been a prominent competitor in the Italian Prestige Motocross Championship, becoming the MX2 class champion in 2022 and MX1 class champion in 2026.

Pancar is the son of Igor Pancar, a Slovenian former national-level motocross racer.

== Career ==
=== Junior career ===
Growing up in a family with a background in motocross, Pancar progressed through the ranks of sport in Slovenia and across Europe. In 2014, he won the south west qualifying zone for the EMX85 class of the European Motocross Championship. Pancar finished twelfth in the EMX85 final and competed in the FIM Motocross Junior World Championship, scoring six points.

Moving up to compete on a 125cc motorcycle in 2015, Pancar competed in the EMX125 class of the European Championship, finishing ninth overall at the Italian round. In addition, he finished seventeenth at the FIM Junior World Championship, formed part of the Slovenian team that finished sixth at the Motocross of European Nations and became Slovenian national champion in the MX2 class. Pancar competed in the full EMX125 season in 2016, finishing twentieth in the final standings. In the FIM Junior World Championship, held in Russia, the Slovenian finished sixth overall. Pancar successfully defending his Slovenian MX2 title and at the end of the year competed in the 2016 Motocross des Nations for his country, forming part of the team that finished twenty-third overall after not qualifying for the main races.

=== 250 Career ===
Due to his ties with Yamaha, Pancar was given the opportunity to compete for the ASTES4-TESAR Yamaha team in the EMX250 class of the 2017 European Motocross Championship, when the teams riders picked up injuries pre-season. After not qualifying for a number of rounds in the early part of the championship, he would finish thirty-second in the final standings and later in the year represented his country for the second time at the 2017 Motocross des Nations. In addition to this, Pancar won his third straight Slovenian Championship in the MX2 class and competed at the Motocross of European Nations for the Slovenian team. Competing with the help of his own personal sponsors, Pancar competed in the second half of the 2018 European Motocross Championship, scoring thirteen points. Additionally, he made his Grand Prix debut in the MX2 class at the Turkish round of the 2018 FIM Motocross World Championship, scoring eleven points across the two races.

Instead of continuing to compete in the EMX class, Pancar opted to move into the MX2 class of the 2019 FIM Motocross World Championship. In the second half of the season, he became a regular points scorer and managed to finish tenth in the first race at the round held in Maggiora as his best result. Pancar took his fourth national MX2 title alongside his World Championship campaign and competed in the 2019 Motocross des Nations, where the Slovenian team finished thirteenth. From these results, he was able to gain the support of the KTM Racestore team to compete in the full 2020 FIM Motocross World Championship, achieving two top-ten finishes and becoming a consistent points scorer throughout the season. Pancar was retained by the Racestore team for a second season during the 2021 FIM Motocross World Championship, repeating his twentieth in the final standings in MX2, only finishing outside the points in a handful of races. As part of the team he finished fourth in the MX2 class of the Italian Prestige Motocross Championship and represented his country at the 2021 Motocross des Nations, where the team failed to qualify for the main races.

Ahead of the 2022 FIM Motocross World Championship, Pancar formed his own team to compete in the MX2 class. This move saw a clear improvement in his results, progressing to be a regular top-ten finisher on his privateer programme, ending the championship in eleventh overall. In addition, Pancar became Elite MX2 champion in the Italian Prestige Motocross Championship, winning three of the six rounds held. He had similar success in the 2023 FIM Motocross World Championship, finishing eleventh again in the final standings of the MX2 class and recording ten top-ten overall finishes. At the 2023 Motocross des Nations, Pancar was part of the Slovenian team that finished ninth in the final standings, with his fourteenth in the second main race being key to that result. In the Italian Prestige championship, Pancar was unable to defend his MX2 title, finishing runner-up to Cas Valk after taking two overall wins.

=== 450 Career ===
Pancar moved up to the MXGP class for the 2024 FIM Motocross World Championship, continuing with the same privateer family-run setup of the previous seasons. Despite the difference in resources between his own team and many of his competitors, Pancar was able to adapt to the class quickly, ending the season in thirteenth in the final standings. He achieved several notable results, including finishing fifth overall at the Chinese round, his highest overall position to that point. In addition, Pancar finished as runner-up in the MX1 class of the 2024 Italian Prestige Motocross Championship, taking one race win at the second round. Riding for Slovenia in the Open class at the 2024 Motocross des Nations, he finished eighth in his qualifying race, before finishing fifteenth and sixteenth in the main races. The Slovenian team ended the event with a new high of seventh overall.

Pancar put in a similarly consistent performance during the 2025 FIM Motocross World Championship, this time finishing eleventh in the final standings and recording his first ever top-three race finish at the Czech round. Pancar was also strong at the 2025 Motocross des Nations, where he recorded a third place finish in the second main race, as the Slovenian team improved on their best ever finish by coming home in fifth. In the 2025 Italian Prestige Motocross Championship, Pancar again finished second in the series, taking two overall wins and four race wins. Pancar was similarly consistent in the 2026 FIM Motocross World Championship, this time finishing twelfth in the final standings, with his best results coming in the final three flyaway rounds. He made his eighth appearance for Slovenia at the 2026 Motocross des Nations and captained the team in the absence of Tim Gajser. Pancar put him some of his strongest performances of the season, finishing third in his qualifying race before finishing fifth and seventh in his two main races. With the team finishing thirteenth overall, Pancar recorded his highest finish in the individual classes to date, with fourth in MXGP. Outside of the world championship paddock, Pancar won the 2026 Italian Prestige Motocross Championship in the MX1 class, adding a first premier class title to the MX2 title he won in 2022.

== Honours ==
Italian Prestige Motocross Championship

- MX1 Elite: 2026 (gold) 2024 & 2025 (silver)
- MX2 Elite: 2022 (gold) , 2023 (silver)

Slovenian Motocross Championship

- Open: 2022 (silver)
- MX2: 2015, 2016, 2017 & 2019 (gold) , 2018 (silver)

== Career statistics ==
=== Motocross des Nations ===
Year	Location	Nation	Class	Teammates	Team Overall	Individual Overall
2016	(Italy) Maggiora	SLO	MX2	Peter Irt; Jernej Irt	23rd	n/a
2017	(United Kingdom) Matterley Basin	SLO	MX2	Tim Gajser; Peter Irt	12th	18th
2019	(Netherlands) Assen	SLO	MX2	Tim Gajser; Peter Irt	13th	17th
2021	(Italy) Mantova	SLO	MX2	Luka Kutnar; Peter Irt	24th	n/a
2023	(France) Ernée	SLO	MX2	Tim Gajser; Miha Bubnic	9th	11th
2024	(United Kingdom) Matterley Basin	SLO	Open	Tim Gajser; Jaka Peklaj	7th	6th
2025	(United States) Ironman	SLO	Open	Tim Gajser; Jaka Peklaj	5th	5th
2026	(France) Ernée	SLO	MXGP	Jaka Peklaj; Lukas Osek	13th	4th

=== FIM Motocross World Championship ===
==== By season ====
Season	Class	Number	Motorcycle	Team	Race	Race Wins	Overall Wins	Race Top-3	Overall Podium	Pts	Plcd
2018	MX2	253	Yamaha	Delta Yamaha	2	0	0	0	0	11	46th
2019	MX2	253	Yamaha	Yamaha Delta Team Krško JP 253	22	0	0	0	0	47	28th
2020	MX2	253	KTM	KTM Racestore MX2	36	0	0	0	0	115	20th
2021	MX2	253	KTM	KTM Racestore MX2	36	0	0	0	0	136	20th
2022	MX2	253	KTM	TEM JP253	32	0	0	0	0	284	11th
2023	MX2	253	KTM	TEM JP253 KTM Racing Team	38	0	0	0	0	348	11th
2024	MXGP	253	KTM	TEM JP253 KTM Racing Team	40	0	0	0	0	287	13th
2025	MXGP	253	KTM	TEM JP253 KTM Racing Team	38	0	0	1	0	321	11th
2026	MXGP	253	KTM	TEM JP253 KTM Racing Team	38	0	0	0	0	338	12th
Total					282	0	0	1	0	1888	
