= Julius Mikula =

Czech motocross racer

- Nationality: Czech
- Born: 12 August 2006 (age 20) Most, Czech Republic

Motocross career
- Years active: 2021–present
- Teams: Team Yamaha Europe MJC (2023); TM Moto CRD Motosport (2025); Osička MX Team (2024, 2026–)

Julius Mikula (born 12 August 2006) is a Czech professional motocross racer. Mikula has competed in the Motocross World Championship since the 2024 season.

Mikula has twice represented his country at the Motocross des Nations, most recently at the 2024 event. Additionally, Mikula competed for an FIM Europe combined team at the 2022 event.

After three seasons competing in the EMX125 class of the European Motocross Championship, Mikula moved up to the MX2 class of the Motocross World Championship from the 2024 season, skipping the EMX250 class entirely.

In 2024 Mikula competed for the Osička MX Team before moving to TM's official MX2 team for 2025. Mikula returned to the Osička team after one season way for the 2026 season.

== Career ==
=== Junior career ===
After starting in the sport at a young age, Mikula progressed through the junior ranks in Czech Republic and around Europe. He led the 50cc national championship in 2015 but missed out on the title due to a broken leg prior to the last round. Mikula began competing on a 65cc motorcycle in 2016, debuting in the EMX65 class of the 2016 European Motocross Championsip, held in front of his home crowd. In 2017, Mikula was able to win his first national title, by winning the 65cc class of the Czech Junior Motocross Championship. In the EMX65 class of the 2017 European Motocross Championship, Mikula put on an eye catching performance in front of his home fans, finishing second in the second race and ending the event in fourth overall. He also debuted in the FIM Motocross Junior World Championship, finishing nineteenth in the 65 class and won the 65cc class at the International Dutch Supercross in Zuidbroek.

Mikula moved up to compete on an 85cc motorcycle for 2018, competing for the JD Gunnex team in the Czech Republic and finishing third in the national championship. For 2019, Mikula focussed on the Junior Cup 85 class of the ADAC MX Masters in Germany, where he finished fifth in the final standings. He finished tenth on his debut in the EMX85 class of the 2019 European Motocross Championship but had a more challenging time at the Junior World Championship, where he only scored four points. Additionally, Mikula was part of the Czech team that took the bronze medal at the Motocross of European Nations in Poland. Mikula's third and final year on an 85 came in the COVID-19 pandemic-impacted 2020 season, where he took the Czech Junior title in the 85cc class and won the opening two rounds of the ADAC Junior Cup 85 championship in Germany.

Mikula moved up to competed on a 125cc motorcycle for 2021, competing in the EMX125 class of the 2021 European Motocross Championship from the third rounds onwards. He scored five top-ten race finishes across the remaining seven rounds, with his best overall result being ninth at the Spanish round. Mikula continued to progress in the 2022 European Motocross Championship, narrowly missing his first podium at the second EMX125 round in Italy. Keeping up the strong form, Mikula took a surprise race win at the seventh round in the deep sand of Lommel, also securing a podium following his ride to fourth in the second race. In a mostly privateer setup, Mikula was able to finish sixth in the championship. In the FIM Junior World Championship, he was able to finish fifth overall, whilst outside the MXGP paddock he finished third in the Junior Cup 125 class of the ADAC MX Masters with four race wins. Despite missing two rounds of the Czech Junior Championship, his eight race wins were enough to ensure he still finished as runner-up in the 125cc class. At the end of the year, Mikula took part in the 2022 Motocross des Nations, representing an FIM Europe combined team for rider from nations who could not afford to send their own team to America. The team would not qualify for the main races.

After his impressive results in the previous season, Mikula was signed by Yamaha's official EMX125 team for the 2023 European Motocross Championship. However, he would miss the first three rounds of championship due to a fractured left foot at a pre-season race. Mikula faced the challenge of racing himself back into fitness upon his return but did record a sixth overall in Latvia and a fifth overall in the final round, to end the season in twelfth. Additionally, he finished seventh in the FIM Junior Worlds held in Romania and made his debut representing his country at the 2023 Motocross des Nations. The 2023 Motocross des Nations was his first event on a 250cc motorcycle and his results contributed to the team finishing fifteenth.

=== 250 Career ===
==== 2024 ====
After losing his spot with Yamaha following a single season, Mikula signed a deal with the Osička MX Team to compete at the European rounds of the 2024 FIM Motocross World Championship, in the MX2 class. The ambitious move would see him skip the EMX250 class entirely and move straight into world championship competition. Across the eight rounds contested, Mikula showed his potential by scoring eight top-fifteen race finishes, with twelfth overall at the Latvian round being the highlight. A hip injury at his home round brought his first world championship campaign to a premature end. Mikula returned to represent his country at the 2024 Motocross des Nations, where he finished eleventh in his qualifying race before finishing twenty-fifth and seventeenth in the main races, with the team ending fourteenth overall.

==== 2025 ====
Following on from his partial campaign in the previous year, Mikula was signed a deal with TM's official team to compete in the MX2 class of the 2025 FIM Motocross World Championship. Mikula scored a handful of top-ten race finishes across the rounds contested, with ninth overall in the deep mud at the second round and seventh in the qualifying race at his home round being the highlights. After missing the final three rounds, Mikula ended the championship in seventeenth. Being part of the Italian team meant that Mikula also contested the 2025 Italian Prestige Motocross Championship, where he finished third in the final standings, with several podiums to his name.

==== 2026 ====
After a single season away, Mikula returned to the Osička MX Team for the 2026 FIM Motocross World Championship. The move saw Mikula take a significant step forward in comparison to the previous seasons, finishing regularly inside the top-ten and pushing forward into the top-five on several occasions. At the fifth round in Trentino, Mikula finished fourth overall after a fourth in the second race, whilst across the rest of the season he recorded eight further top-eight overall results. His consistency meant that he ended the championship in ninth, despite missing the last round due to an injury picked up in China. The shoulder injury picked up ultimately meant Mikula had to withdraw from the 2026 Motocross des Nations.

== Honours ==
Motocross of European Nations

- Team Overall: 2019 (Czech Republic) (bronze)

ADAC MX Masters

- Junior Cup 125: 2022 (bronze)

Italian Prestige Motocross Championship

- MX2 Elite: 2025 (bronze)

Czech Junior Motocross Championship

- 125cc: 2022 (silver)
- 85cc: 2020 (gold) , 2018 (bronze)
- 65cc: 2017 (gold)

== Career statistics ==
=== Motocross des Nations ===
Year	Location	Nation	Class	Teammates	Team Overall	Individual Overall
2022	(United States) Red Bud	FIM Europe	MX2	Noel Zanócz	27th	N/A
2023	(France) Ernée	CZE	MX2	Václav Kovář; Jakub Terešák	15th	14th
2024	(United Kingdom) Matterley Basin	CZE	MX2	Petr Polák; Jakub Terešák	14th	10th

=== FIM Motocross World Championship ===
==== By season ====
Season	Class	Number	Motorcycle	Team	Race	Race Wins	Overall Wins	Race Top-3	Overall Podium	Pts	Plcd
2024	MX2	451	KTM	Osička MX Team	15	0	0	0	0	75	22nd
2025	MX2	20	TM	TM Moto CRD Motosport	31	0	0	0	0	205	17th
2026	MX2	20	KTM	Osička MX Team	33	0	0	0	0	401	9th
Total					79	0	0	0	0	681	
