= 2023 Motocross des Nations =

2023 edition of Motocross des Nations

The 2023 Motocross des Nations is a motocross race to be held on 7 and 8 October 2023 in Ernée, France. This is the third time that the event is held at this track. The event was due to take place here in 2020, but got cancelled due to the COVID-19 pandemic. USA goes into the event as the defending champions after winning their twentythird title in 2022.

== Entry list ==
Start numbers were allocated based on the team finishes from the 2022 competition. This allocated number plates 1, 2 & 3 to USA (1st), 4, 5 & 6 to France (2nd) and 7, 8 & 9 to Australia (3rd).

The official entry list was published on 16 September.

	Country	Nr	Rider	Class	Motorcycle
1	United States	1	Aaron Plessinger	MXGP	KTM
1	United States	2	RJ Hampshire	MX2	Husqvarna
1	United States	3	Christian Craig	Open	Husqvarna
2	France	4	Romain Febvre	MXGP	Kawasaki
2	France	5	Tom Vialle	MX2	KTM
2	France	6	Maxime Renaux	Open	Yamaha
3	Australia	7	Jett Lawrence	MXGP	Honda
3	Australia	8	Hunter Lawrence	MX2	Honda
3	Australia	9	Dean Ferris	Open	Yamaha
4	Italy	10	Alberto Forato	MXGP	KTM
4	Italy	11	Andrea Adamo	MX2	KTM
4	Italy	12	Andrea Bonacorsi	Open	Yamaha
5	Belgium	13	Jago Geerts	MXGP	Yamaha
5	Belgium	14	Lucas Coenen	MX2	Husqvarna
5	Belgium	15	Liam Everts	Open	KTM
6	Spain	16	Jorge Prado	MXGP	Honda
6	Spain	17	Oriol Oliver	MX2	KTM
6	Spain	18	Rubén Fernández	Open	Gas Gas
7	Netherlands	19	Calvin Vlaanderen	MXGP	Yamaha
7	Netherlands	20	Kay de Wolf	MX2	Husqvarna
7	Netherlands	21	Glenn Coldenhoff	Open	Yamaha
8	Germany	22	Ken Roczen	MXGP	Suzuki
8	Germany	23	Simon Längenfelder	MX2	Gas Gas
8	Germany	24	Tom Koch	Open	KTM
9	Switzerland	25	Jeremy Seewer	MXGP	Yamaha
9	Switzerland	26	Arnaud Tonus	MX2	Yamaha
9	Switzerland	27	Valentin Guillod	Open	Honda
10	(United Kingdom) Great Britain	28	Ben Watson	MXGP	Beta
10	(United Kingdom) Great Britain	29	Josh Gilbert	MX2	Honda
10	(United Kingdom) Great Britain	30	Conrad Mewse	Open	Honda
11	Latvia	31	Pauls Jonass	MXGP	Honda
11	Latvia	32	Jānis Reišulis	MX2	Yamaha
11	Latvia	33	Kārlis Reišulis	Open	Yamaha
12	Sweden	34	Alvin Östlund	MXGP	Honda
12	Sweden	35	Filip Bengtsson	MX2	KTM
12	Sweden	36	Isak Gifting	Open	Gas Gas
13	Norway	37	Cornelius Tøndel	MXGP	Honda
13	Norway	38	Kevin Horgmo	MX2	Kawasaki
13	Norway	39	Håkon Fredriksen	Open	Yamaha
14	Finland	40	Miro Sihvonen	MXGP	Husqvarna
14	Finland	41	Emil Weckman	MX2	Honda
14	Finland	42	Jere Haavisto	Open	KTM
15	Canada	43	Dylan Wright	MXGP	Honda
15	Canada	44	Ryder McNabb	MX2	KTM
15	Canada	45	Jess Pettis	Open	KTM
16	Chile	46	Matías Pavez	MXGP	Gas Gas
16	Chile	47	Benjamín Garib	MX2	Kawasaki
16	Chile	48	Nicolás Israel	Open	Gas Gas
17	Guam	49	Grant Harlan	MXGP	Yamaha
17	Guam	50	Joshua Varize	MX2	KTM
17	Guam	51	Sean Lipanovich	Open	KTM
18	South Africa	52	Cameron Durow	MXGP	KTM
18	South Africa	53	Camden McLellan	MX2	Honda
18	South Africa	54	Jesse Wright	Open	Yamaha
19	Estonia	55	Tanel Leok	MXGP	Husqvarna
19	Estonia	56	Jörgen-Matthias Talviku	MX2	Husqvarna
19	Estonia	57	Harri Kullas	Open	Yamaha
20	New Zealand	61	Cody Cooper	MXGP	Gas Gas
20	New Zealand	62	James Scott	MX2	Yamaha
20	New Zealand	63	Hamish Harwood	Open	KTM
21	Lithuania	64	Domantas Jazdauskas	MXGP	KTM
21	Lithuania	65	Erlandas Mackonis	MX2	KTM
21	Lithuania	66	Dovydas Karka	Open	Yamaha
22	(Republic of Ireland) Ireland	67	Martin Barr	MXGP	Husqvarna
22	(Republic of Ireland) Ireland	68	Glenn McCormick	MX2	Gas Gas
22	(Republic of Ireland) Ireland	69	Jason Meara	Open	Gas Gas
23	Brazil	73	Eduardo Lima	MXGP	Husqvarna
23	Brazil	74	Guilherme Bresolin	MX2	Yamaha
23	Brazil	75	Fábio Santos	Open	Yamaha
24	Mexico	76	Arturo Humberto Fierro	MXGP	Kawasaki
24	Mexico	77	Víctor García Hernández	MX2	KTM
24	Mexico	78	Jorge Rubalcava	Open	Husqvarna
25	Iceland	82	Máni Freyr Pétursson	MXGP	Fantic
25	Iceland	83	Eiður Orri Pálmarsson	MX2	Yamaha
25	Iceland	84	Alexander Adam Kuc	Open	Gas Gas
26	FIM Latin America	88	(Ecuador) Miguel Cordovez	MXGP	KTM
26	FIM Latin America	89	(Bolivia) Marco Antezana	MX2	KTM
26	FIM Latin America	90	(Argentina) Joaquín Poli	Open	Kawasaki
27	Morocco	94	Saad Soulimani	MXGP	Kawasaki
27	Morocco	95	Noam Jayal	MX2	Kawasaki
27	Morocco	96	Maxime Simon	Open	Honda
28	Portugal	103	Luís Outeiro	MXGP	Yamaha
28	Portugal	104	Afonso Gomes	MX2	Yamaha
28	Portugal	105	Paulo Alberto	Open	Yamaha
29	Croatia	106	Matija Kelava	MXGP	Honda
29	Croatia	107	Luka Kunić	MX2	Yamaha
29	Croatia	108	Matija Šterpin	Open	Yamaha
30	Luxembourg	109	Damien De Muyser	MXGP	Honda
30	Luxembourg	110	Jamie Heinen	MX2	KTM
30	Luxembourg	111	Joé Stark	Open	Honda
31	Slovakia	112	Pavol Repčák	MXGP	KTM
31	Slovakia	113	Jaroslav Katriňák	MX2	KTM
31	Slovakia	114	Šimon Jošt	Open	KTM
32	Czech Republic	115	Václav Kovář	MXGP	KTM
32	Czech Republic	116	Julius Mikula	MX2	Yamaha
32	Czech Republic	117	Jakub Terešák	Open	Husqvarna
33	Slovenia	118	Tim Gajser	MXGP	Honda
33	Slovenia	119	Jan Pancar	MX2	KTM
33	Slovenia	120	Miha Bubnič	Open	KTM
34	Austria	124	Michael Kratzer	MXGP	Honda
34	Austria	125	Marcel Stauffer	MX2	KTM
34	Austria	126	Johannes Klein	Open	KTM
35	Greece	127	Andreas Andreou	MXGP	Yamaha
35	Greece	128	Dimitrios Bakas	MX2	Yamaha
35	Greece	129	Athanasios Avgeris	Open	Yamaha
36	Ukraine	130	Pavlo Kizlyak	MXGP	KTM
36	Ukraine	131	Dmytro Marchuk	MX2	Gas Gas
36	Ukraine	132	Vasyl Kurosh	Open	KTM
37	Poland	133	Jakub Barczewski	MXGP	KTM
37	Poland	134	Damian Zdunek	MX2	Honda
37	Poland	135	Jakub Kowalski	Open	Gas Gas
38	Puerto Rico	136	Rodny González	MXGP	Kawasaki
38	Puerto Rico	137	Jack Chambers	MX2	Kawasaki
38	Puerto Rico	138	Edwardo Morales	Open	Kawasaki

== Qualifying Races ==
Qualifying is run on a class by class basis. Top 19 countries after qualifying go directly to the main Motocross des Nations races. The remaining countries go to a smaller final. Best 2 scores count.

=== MXGP ===
Place	Nr	Rider	Motorcycle	Laps	Gap
1	16	(Spain) Jorge Prado	Gas Gas	12	
2	7	(Australia) Jett Lawrence	Honda	12	+4.376
3	25	(Switzerland) Jeremy Seewer	Yamaha	12	+6.438
4	22	(Germany) Ken Roczen	Suzuki	12	+8.476
5	4	(France) Romain Febvre	Kawasaki	12	+15.670
6	118	(Slovenia) Tim Gajser	Honda	12	+23.761
7	13	(Belgium) Jago Geerts	Yamaha	12	+32.181
8	1	(United States) Aaron Plessinger	KTM	12	+45.364
9	31	(Latvia) Pauls Jonass	Honda	12	+46.219
10	28	(United Kingdom) Ben Watson	Beta	12	+49.578
11	19	(Netherlands) Calvin Vlaanderen	Yamaha	12	+1:04.191
12	40	(Finland) Miro Sihvonen	Husqvarna	12	+1:16.973
13	34	(Sweden) Alvin Östlund	Honda	12	+1:25.463
14	61	(New Zealand) Cody Cooper	Gas Gas	12	+1:31.310
15	37	(Norway) Cornelius Tøndel	Honda	12	+1:41.369
16	10	(Italy) Alberto Forato	KTM	12	+1:46.010
17	67	(Republic of Ireland) Martin Barr	Husqvarna	12	+2:00.501
18	64	(Lithuania) Domantas Jazdauskas	KTM	11	+1 Lap
19	55	(Estonia) Tanel Leok	Husqvarna	11	+1 Lap
20	88	(Ecuador) Miguel Cordovez	KTM	11	+1 Lap
21	112	(Slovakia) Pavol Repčák	KTM	11	+1 Lap
22	52	(South Africa) Cameron Durow	KTM	11	+1 Lap
23	106	(Croatia) Matija Kelava	Honda	11	+1 Lap
24	103	(Portugal) Luís Outeiro	Yamaha	11	+1 Lap
25	94	(Morocco) Saad Soulimani	Kawasaki	11	+1 Lap
26	76	(Mexico) Tre Fierro	Kawasaki	11	+1 Lap
27	133	(Poland) Jakub Barczewski	KTM	11	+1 Lap
28	73	(Brazil) Eduardo Lima	Husqvarna	11	+1 Lap
29	82	(Iceland) Máni Freyr Pétursson	Fantic	11	+1 Lap
30	127	(Greece) Andreas Andreou	Yamaha	10	+2 Laps
31	130	(Ukraine) Pavlo Kizlyak	KTM	10	+2 Laps
32	109	(Luxembourg) Damien De Muyser	Honda	9	+3 Laps
33	43	(Canada) Dylan Wright	Honda	4	Did Not Finish
34	46	(Chile) Matías Pavez	Honda	1	Did Not Finish
35	49	(Guam) Grant Harlan	Yamaha	0	Did Not Finish
DSQ	115	(Czech Republic) Václav Kovář	KTM	-	Disqualified
DNS	136	(Puerto Rico) Rodny González	Kawasaki	-	Did Not Start

=== MX2 ===
Place	Nr	Rider	Motorcycle	Laps	Gap
1	5	(France) Tom Vialle	KTM	12	
2	23	(Germany) Simon Längenfelder	Gas Gas	12	+1.856
3	8	(Australia) Hunter Lawrence	Honda	12	+5.737
4	20	(Netherlands) Kay de Wolf	Husqvarna	12	+13.429
5	2	(United States) RJ Hampshire	Husqvarna	12	+14.139
6	53	(South Africa) Camden McLellan	Honda	12	+44.115
7	119	(Slovenia) Jan Pancar	KTM	12	+58.045
8	17	(Spain) Oriol Oliver	KTM	12	+58.564
9	137	(Puerto Rico) Jack Chambers	Kawasaki	12	+1:02.945
10	11	(Italy) Andrea Adamo	KTM	12	+1:04.701
11	38	(Norway) Kevin Horgmo	Kawasaki	12	+1:08.169
12	47	(Chile) Benjamín Garib	Kawasaki	12	+1:12.686
13	26	(Switzerland) Arnaud Tonus	Yamaha	12	+1:20.588
14	56	(Estonia) Jörgen-Matthias Talviku	Husqvarna	12	+1:23.573
15	32	(Latvia) Jānis Reišulis	Yamaha	12	+1:26.986
16	50	(Guam) Joshua Varize	KTM	12	+1:28.201
17	29	(United Kingdom) Josh Gilbert	Husqvarna	12	+1:33.049
18	41	(Finland) Emil Weckman	Honda	12	+1:39.984
19	116	(Czech Republic) Julius Mikula	Yamaha	12	+1:41.980
20	62	(New Zealand) James Scott	Yamaha	12	+1:43.807
21	14	(Belgium) Lucas Coenen	Husqvarna	12	+1:45.344
22	74	(Brazil) Guilherme Bresolin	Yamaha	12	+1:59.038
23	113	(Slovakia) Jaroslav Katriňák	Gas Gas	11	+1 Lap
24	44	(Canada) Ryder McNabb	KTM	11	+1 Lap
25	65	(Lithuania) Erlandas Mackonis	KTM	11	+1 Lap
26	35	(Sweden) Filip Bengtsson	KTM	11	+1 Lap
27	104	(Portugal) Afonso Gomes	Yamaha	11	+1 Lap
28	68	(Republic of Ireland) Glenn McCormick	Gas Gas	11	+1 Lap
29	110	(Luxembourg) Jamie Heinen	KTM	11	+1 Lap
30	89	(Bolivia) Marco Antezana	KTM	11	+1 Lap
31	134	(Poland) Damian Zdunek	Honda	11	+1 Lap
32	95	(Morocco) Noam Jayal	Kawasaki	11	+1 Lap
33	107	(Croatia) Luka Kunić	Yamaha	11	+1 Lap
34	83	(Iceland) Eiður Orri Pálmarsson	Yamaha	11	+1 Lap
35	77	(Mexico) Víctor Francisco García	KTM	10	+2 Laps
36	128	(Greece) Dimitrios Bakas	Yamaha	10	+2 Laps
37	131	(Ukraine) Dmytro Marchuk	Gas Gas	10	+2 Laps

=== Open ===
Place	Nr	Rider	Motorcycle	Laps	Gap
1	6	(France) Maxime Renaux	Yamaha	12	
2	18	(Spain) Rubén Fernández	Honda	12	+11.139
3	15	(Belgium) Liam Everts	KTM	12	+14.659
4	57	(Estonia) Harri Kullas	Yamaha	12	+21.036
5	3	(United States) Christian Craig	Husqvarna	12	+29.938
6	27	(Switzerland) Valentin Guillod	Honda	12	+34.351
7	12	(Italy) Andrea Bonacorsi	Yamaha	12	+36.304
8	24	(Germany) Tom Koch	KTM	12	+50.560
9	75	(Brazil) Fábio Santos	Yamaha	12	+55.992
10	63	(New Zealand) Hamish Harwood	KTM	12	+57.441
11	117	(Czech Republic) Jakub Terešák	Husqvarna	12	+58.691
12	39	(Norway) Håkon Fredriksen	Husqvarna	12	+1:05.392
13	114	(Slovakia) Šimon Jošt	KTM	12	+1:22.022
14	45	(Canada) Jess Pettis	KTM	12	+1:04.724
15	90	(Argentina) Joaquín Poli	Kawasaki	12	+1:28.475
16	33	(Latvia) Kārlis Reišulis	Yamaha	12	+1:35.472
17	69	(Republic of Ireland) Jason Meara	Gas Gas	12	+1:38.596
18	42	(Finland) Jere Haavisto	KTM	12	+1:56.356
19	51	(Guam) Sean Lipanovich	KTM	12	+2:00.208
20	48	(Chile) Nicolás Israel	KTM	11	+1 Lap
21	66	(Lithuania) Dovydas Karka	Yamaha	11	+1 Lap
22	30	(United Kingdom) Conrad Mewse	Honda	11	+1 Lap
23	78	(Mexico) Jorge Rubalcava	Husqvarna	11	+1 Lap
24	120	(Slovenia) Miha Bubnič	KTM	11	+1 Lap
25	135	(Poland) Jakub Kowalski	Gas Gas	11	+1 Lap
26	84	(Iceland) Alexander Adam Kuc	Gas Gas	11	+1 Lap
27	108	(Croatia) Matija Šterpin	Yamaha	10	+2 Laps
28	54	(South Africa) Jesse Wright	Yamaha	10	+2 Laps
29	96	(Morocco) Maxime Simon	Honda	10	+2 Laps
30	129	(Greece) Athanasios Avgeris	Yamaha	9	+3 Laps
31	111	(Luxembourg) Joé Stark	Honda	9	+3 Laps
32	132	(Ukraine) Vasyl Kurosh	KTM	9	+3 Laps
33	9	(Australia) Dean Ferris	Yamaha	3	Did Not Finish
34	105	(Portugal) Paulo Alberto	Yamaha	2	Did Not Finish
35	36	(Sweden) Isak Gifting	Gas Gas	1	Did Not Finish
36	138	(Puerto Rico) Edwardo Morales	Kawasaki	1	Did Not Finish
37	21	(Netherlands) Glenn Coldenhoff	Yamaha	1	Did Not Finish

=== Qualification Standings ===
- Qualified Nations

Place	Nation	Points
1	France	2
2	Spain	3
3	Australia	5
4	Germany	6
5	Switzerland	9
6	United States	10
7	Belgium	10
8	Slovenia	13
9	Netherlands	15
10	Italy	17
11	Estonia	18
12	Norway	23
13	Latvia	24
14	New Zealand	24
15	United Kingdom	27
16	South Africa	28
17	Finland	30
18	Czech Republic	30
19	Brazil	31

- Nations admitted to the B-Final

Place	Nation	Points
20	Chile	32
21	Slovakia	34
22	Ireland	34
23	FIM Latin America	35
24	Guam	35
25	Canada	38
26	Lithuania	39
27	Sweden	39
28	Puerto Rico	45
29	Mexico	49
30	Croatia	50
31	Portugal	51

- Nations admitted to the C-Final

Place	Nation	Points
32	Poland	52
33	Morocco	54
34	Iceland	55
35	Luxembourg	60
36	Greece	60
37	Ukraine	63

== C-Final ==
The C-Final is for the nations who finished 31st-37th in qualifying. The top nation from the C-Final qualify for the B-Final, the remaining are eliminated. Best 2 scores for each nation counts.

=== Race ===
Place	Nr	Rider	Motorcycle	Laps	Gap
1	94	(Morocco) Saad Soulimani	Kawasaki	12	
2	82	(Iceland) Máni Freyr Pétursson	Fantic	12	+14.224
3	133	(Poland) Jakub Barczewski	KTM	12	+14.645
4	135	(Poland) Jakub Kowalski	Gas Gas	12	+50.447
5	83	(Iceland) Eiður Orri Pálmarsson	Yamaha	12	+59.432
6	84	(Iceland) Alexander Adam Kuc	Gas Gas	12	+1:18.687
7	110	(Luxembourg) Jamie Heinen	KTM	12	+1:24.886
8	95	(Morocco) Noam Jayal	Kawasaki	12	+1:30.816
9	134	(Poland) Damian Zdunek	Honda	12	+1:33.179
10	96	(Morocco) Maxime Simon	Honda	12	+1:47.970
11	132	(Ukraine) Vasyl Kurosh	KTM	11	+1 Lap
12	131	(Ukraine) Dmytro Marchuk	Gas Gas	11	+1 Lap
13	128	(Greece) Dimitrios Bakas	Yamaha	11	+1 Lap
14	130	(Ukraine) Pavlo Kizlyak	KTM	11	+1 Lap
15	109	(Luxembourg) Damien De Muyser	Honda	11	+1 Lap
16	129	(Greece) Athanasios Avgeris	Yamaha	11	+1 Lap
17	111	(Luxembourg) Joé Stark	Honda	11	+1 Lap
DNS	127	(Greece) Andreas Andreou	Yamaha	-	Did Not Start

=== C-Final Standings ===
- Iceland qualify for the B-Final.

Place	Nation	Points
1	Iceland	7
2	Poland	7
3	Morocco	9
4	Luxembourg	22
5	Ukraine	23
6	Greece	29

== B-Final ==
The B-Final is for the nations who finished 20th-31st in qualifying. The top nation from the B-Final qualify for the main Motocross des Nations races, the remaining are eliminated. Best 2 scores for each nation counts.

=== Race ===
Place	Nr	Rider	Motorcycle	Laps	Gap
1	105	(Portugal) Paulo Alberto	Yamaha	12	
2	34	(Sweden) Alvin Östlund	Honda	12	+15.185
3	112	(Slovakia) Pavol Repčák	KTM	12	+24.495
4	50	(Guam) Joshua Varize	KTM	12	+26.102
5	35	(Sweden) Filip Bengtsson	KTM	12	+23.799
6	69	(Republic of Ireland) Jason Meara	Gas Gas	12	+27.491
7	103	(Portugal) Luís Outeiro	Yamaha	12	+25.703
8	114	(Slovakia) Šimon Jošt	KTM	12	+39.610
9	44	(Canada) Ryder McNabb	KTM	12	+49.909
10	113	(Slovakia) Jaroslav Katriňák	Gas Gas	12	+59.009
11	64	(Lithuania) Domantas Jazdauskas	KTM	12	+1:03.537
12	90	(Argentina) Joaquín Poli	Kawasaki	12	+40.360
13	46	(Chile) Matías Pavez	Honda	12	+1:04.323
14	65	(Lithuania) Erlandas Mackonis	KTM	12	+1:05.528
15	89	(Bolivia) Marco Antezana	KTM	12	+1:25.786
16	48	(Chile) Nicolás Israel	KTM	12	+1:30.934
17	66	(Lithuania) Dovydas Karka	Yamaha	12	+1:36.391
18	45	(Canada) Jess Pettis	KTM	12	+28.474
19	76	(Mexico) Tre Fierro	Kawasaki	12	+1:39.264
20	104	(Portugal) Afonso Gomes	Yamaha	12	+1:39.561
21	88	(Ecuador) Miguel Cordovez	KTM	12	+1:59.718
22	78	(Mexico) Jorge Rubalcava	Husqvarna	12	+2:00.229
23	107	(Croatia) Luka Kunić	Yamaha	11	+1 Lap
24	106	(Croatia) Matija Kelava	Honda	11	+1 Lap
25	84	(Iceland) Alexander Adam Kuc	Gas Gas	11	+1 Lap
26	77	(Mexico) Víctor Francisco García	KTM	11	+1 Lap
27	67	(Republic of Ireland) Martin Barr	Husqvarna	10	+2 Laps
28	108	(Croatia) Matija Šterpin	Yamaha	11	+1 Lap
29	43	(Canada) Dylan Wright	Honda	7	Did Not Finish
30	47	(Chile) Benjamín Garib	Kawasaki	4	Did Not Finish
31	137	(Puerto Rico) Jack Chambers	Kawasaki	3	Did Not Finish
32	68	(Republic of Ireland) Glenn McCormick	Gas Gas	3	Did Not Finish
33	83	(Iceland) Eiður Orri Pálmarsson	Yamaha	2	Did Not Finish
34	51	(Guam) Sean Lipanovich	KTM	0	Did Not Finish
35	82	(Iceland) Máni Freyr Pétursson	Fantic	0	Did Not Finish
DNS	36	(Sweden) Isak Gifting	Gas Gas	0	Did Not Start
DNS	49	(Guam) Grant Harlan	Yamaha	0	Did Not Start
DNS	136	(Puerto Rico) Rodny González	Kawasaki	0	Did Not Start
DNS	138	(Puerto Rico) Edwardo Morales	Kawasaki	0	Did Not Start

=== B-Final Standings ===
- Sweden qualify for the main races.

Place	Nation	Points
1	Sweden	7
2	Portugal	8
3	Slovakia	11
4	Lithuania	25
5	FIM Latin America	27
6	Canada	27
7	Chile	29
8	Ireland	33
9	Guam	38
10	Mexico	41
11	Croatia	47
12	Iceland	58
13	Puerto Rico	31

== Motocross des Nations races ==
The main Motocross des Nations races consist of 3 races which combine two classes together in each. Lowest score wins with each nation allowed to drop their worst score after the final race.

=== MXGP+MX2 ===
Place	Nr	Rider	Motorcycle	Laps	Gap
1	4	(France) Romain Febvre	Kawasaki	18	
2	16	(Spain) Jorge Prado	Gas Gas	18	+2.320
3	22	(Germany) Ken Roczen	Suzuki	18	+26.166
4	25	(Switzerland) Jeremy Seewer	Yamaha	18	+28.846
5	1	(United States) Aaron Plessinger	KTM	18	+30.267
6	7	(Australia) Jett Lawrence	Honda	18	+33.837
7	118	(Slovenia) Tim Gajser	Honda	18	+33.940
8	5	(France) Tom Vialle	KTM	18	+41.304
9	13	(Belgium) Jago Geerts	Yamaha	18	+43.080
10	8	(Australia) Hunter Lawrence	Honda	18	+43.887
11	20	(Netherlands) Kay de Wolf	Husqvarna	18	+54.864
12	10	(Italy) Alberto Forato	KTM	18	+56.145
13	31	(Latvia) Pauls Jonass	Honda	18	+1:01.039
14	23	(Germany) Simon Längenfelder	Gas Gas	18	+1:02.144
15	19	(Netherlands) Calvin Vlaanderen	Yamaha	18	+1:09.490
16	2	(United States) RJ Hampshire	Husqvarna	18	+1:22.933
17	28	(United Kingdom) Ben Watson	Beta	18	+1:24.816
18	11	(Italy) Andrea Adamo	KTM	18	+1:25.465
19	14	(Belgium) Lucas Coenen	Husqvarna	18	+1:29.947
20	56	(Estonia) Jörgen-Matthias Talviku	Husqvarna	18	+1:55.591
21	29	(United Kingdom) Josh Gilbert	Honda	17	+1 Lap
22	53	(South Africa) Camden McLellan	Honda	17	+1 Lap
23	34	(Sweden) Alvin Östlund	Honda	17	+1 Lap
24	17	(Spain) Oriol Oliver	KTM	17	+1 Lap
25	119	(Slovenia) Jan Pancar	KTM	17	+1 Lap
26	61	(New Zealand) Cody Cooper	Gas Gas	17	+1 Lap
27	26	(Switzerland) Arnaud Tonus	Yamaha	17	+1 Lap
28	41	(Finland) Emil Weckman	Honda	17	+1 Lap
29	55	(Estonia) Tanel Leok	Husqvarna	17	+1 Lap
30	116	(Czech Republic) Julius Mikula	Yamaha	17	+1 Lap
31	52	(South Africa) Cameron Durow	KTM	17	+1 Lap
32	73	(Brazil) Eduardo Lima	Husqvarna	17	+1 Lap
33	35	(Sweden) Filip Bengtsson	KTM	17	+1 Lap
34	62	(New Zealand) James Scott	Yamaha	17	+1 Lap
35	74	(Brazil) Guilherme Bresolin	Yamaha	17	+1 Lap
36	40	(Finland) Miro Sihvonen	Husqvarna	17	+1 Lap
37	115	(Czech Republic) Václav Kovář	KTM	16	+2 Laps
38	37	(Norway) Cornelius Tøndel	KTM	14	+4 Laps
39	32	(Latvia) Jānis Reišulis	Yamaha	4	Did Not Finish
40	38	(Norway) Kevin Horgmo	Kawasaki	0	Did Not Finish

=== Nations standings after Race 1 ===
Place	Nation	Points
1	France	9
2	Australia	16
3	Germany	17
4	United States	21
5	Spain	26
6	Netherlands	26
7	Belgium	28
8	Italy	30
9	Switzerland	31
10	Slovenia	32
11	(United Kingdom) Great Britain	38
12	Estonia	49
13	Latvia	52
14	South Africa	53
15	Sweden	56
16	New Zealand	60
17	Finland	64
18	Czech Republic	67
19	Brazil	67
20	Norway	78

=== MX2+Open ===
Place	Nr	Rider	Motorcycle	Laps	Gap
1	6	(France) Maxime Renaux	Yamaha	17	
2	5	(France) Tom Vialle	KTM	17	+0.882
3	15	(Belgium) Liam Everts	KTM	17	+17.342
4	11	(Italy) Andrea Adamo	KTM	17	+20.937
5	8	(Australia) Hunter Lawrence	Honda	17	+30.599
6	27	(Switzerland) Valentin Guillod	Honda	17	+38.812
7	18	(Spain) Rubén Fernández	Honda	17	+43.751
8	12	(Italy) Andrea Bonacorsi	Yamaha	17	+46.180
9	20	(Netherlands) Kay de Wolf	Husqvarna	17	+46.878
10	2	(United States) RJ Hampshire	Husqvarna	17	+49.211
11	23	(Germany) Simon Längenfelder	Gas Gas	17	+1:00.484
12	9	(Australia) Dean Ferris	Yamaha	17	+1:21.091
13	53	(South Africa) Camden McLellan	Honda	17	+1:33.118
14	119	(Slovenia) Jan Pancar	KTM	17	+1:36.573
15	29	(United Kingdom) Josh Gilbert	Honda	17	+1:39.265
16	3	(United States) Christian Craig	Husqvarna	17	+1:41.602
17	24	(Germany) Tom Koch	KTM	17	+1:42.488
18	56	(Estonia) Jörgen-Matthias Talviku	Husqvarna	17	+1:43.806
19	14	(Belgium) Lucas Coenen	Husqvarna	17	+1:44.089
20	57	(Estonia) Harri Kullas	Yamaha	17	+1:45.640
21	38	(Norway) Kevin Horgmo	Kawasaki	17	+1:54.820
22	17	(Spain) Oriol Oliver	KTM	17	+1:56.834
23	63	(New Zealand) Hamish Harwood	KTM	17	+2:00.733
24	26	(Switzerland) Arnaud Tonus	Yamaha	17	+2:12.730
25	30	(United Kingdom) Conrad Mewse	Honda	16	+1 Lap
26	116	(Czech Republic) Julius Mikula	Yamaha	16	+1 Lap
27	74	(Brazil) Guilherme Bresolin	Yamaha	16	+1 Lap
28	32	(Latvia) Jānis Reišulis	Yamaha	16	+1 Lap
29	33	(Latvia) Kārlis Reišulis	Yamaha	16	+1 Lap
30	62	(New Zealand) James Scott	Yamaha	16	+1 Lap
31	35	(Sweden) Filip Bengtsson	KTM	16	+1 Lap
32	117	(Czech Republic) Jakub Terešák	Husqvarna	16	+1 Lap
33	54	(South Africa) Jesse Wright	Yamaha	16	+1 Lap
34	39	(Norway) Håkon Fredriksen	Yamaha	15	Did Not Finish
35	120	(Slovenia) Miha Bubnič	KTM	15	+2 Laps
36	42	(Finland) Jere Haavisto	KTM	7	Did Not Finish
37	75	(Brazil) Fábio Santos	Yamaha	7	Did Not Finish
38	41	(Finland) Emil Weckman	Honda	5	Did Not Finish
DNS	21	(Netherlands) Glenn Coldenhoff	Yamaha	-	Did Not Start
DNS	36	(Sweden) Isak Gifting	Gas Gas	-	Did Not Start

=== Nations standings after Race 2 ===
Place	Nation	Points
1	France	12
2	Australia	33
3	Italy	42
4	Germany	45
5	United States	47
6	Belgium	50
7	Spain	55
8	Switzerland	61
9	(United Kingdom) Great Britain	78
10	Slovenia	81
11	Estonia	87
12	South Africa	99
13	Latvia	109
14	New Zealand	113
15	Czech Republic	125
16	Brazil	131
17	Norway	133
18	Finland	138
19	Netherlands	35
20	Sweden	87

=== MXGP+Open ===
Place	Nr	Rider	Motorcycle	Laps	Gap
1	7	(Australia) Jett Lawrence	Honda	18	
2	22	(Germany) Ken Roczen	Suzuki	18	+7.295
3	6	(France) Maxime Renaux	Yamaha	18	+11.349
4	16	(Spain) Jorge Prado	Gas Gas	18	+12.854
5	118	(Slovenia) Tim Gajser	Honda	18	+21.737
6	25	(Switzerland) Jeremy Seewer	Yamaha	18	+23.245
7	4	(France) Romain Febvre	Kawasaki	18	+1:01.929
8	10	(Italy) Alberto Forato	KTM	18	+1:05.270
9	19	(Netherlands) Calvin Vlaanderen	Yamaha	18	+1:13.321
10	15	(Belgium) Liam Everts	KTM	18	+1:19.073
11	12	(Italy) Andrea Bonacorsi	Yamaha	18	+1:35.141
12	57	(Estonia) Harri Kullas	Yamaha	18	+1:38.632
13	28	(United Kingdom) Ben Watson	Beta	18	+1:39.967
14	13	(Belgium) Jago Geerts	Yamaha	18	+1:50.556
15	27	(Switzerland) Valentin Guillod	Honda	18	+1:56.893
16	9	(Australia) Dean Ferris	Yamaha	18	+1:59.967
17	31	(Latvia) Pauls Jonass	Honda	17	+1 Lap
18	1	(United States) Aaron Plessinger	KTM	17	+1 Lap
19	34	(Sweden) Alvin Östlund	Honda	17	+1 Lap
20	3	(United States) Christian Craig	Husqvarna	17	+1 Lap
21	55	(Estonia) Tanel Leok	Husqvarna	17	+1 Lap
22	33	(Latvia) Kārlis Reišulis	Yamaha	17	+1 Lap
23	30	(United Kingdom) Conrad Mewse	Honda	17	+1 Lap
24	37	(Norway) Cornelius Tøndel	Honda	17	+1 Lap
25	24	(Germany) Tom Koch	KTM	17	+1 Lap
26	63	(New Zealand) Hamish Harwood	KTM	17	+1 Lap
27	115	(Czech Republic) Václav Kovář	KTM	17	+1 Lap
28	18	(Spain) Rubén Fernández	Honda	17	+1 Lap
29	73	(Brazil) Eduardo Lima	Husqvarna	17	+1 Lap
30	54	(South Africa) Jesse Wright	Yamaha	17	+1 Lap
31	52	(South Africa) Cameron Durow	KTM	16	+2 Laps
32	61	(New Zealand) Cody Cooper	Gas Gas	16	+2 Laps
33	40	(Finland) Miro Sihvonen	Husqvarna	16	+2 Laps
34	120	(Slovenia) Miha Bubnič	KTM	15	+3 Laps
35	117	(Czech Republic) Jakub Terešák	Husqvarna	3	Did Not Finish
36	75	(Brazil) Fábio Santos	Yamaha	0	Did Not Finish
DNS	39	(Norway) Håkon Fredriksen	Yamaha	-	Did Not Start
DNS	42	(Finland) Jere Haavisto	KTM	-	Did Not Start
DNS	21	(Netherlands) Glenn Coldenhoff	Yamaha	-	Did Not Start
DNS	36	(Sweden) Isak Gifting	Gas Gas	-	Did Not Start

== Final standings ==
Place	Nation	Points	Total	Change
1	France	1 + 1 + 2 + 3 + 7	14	+1
2	Australia	1 + 5 + 6 + 10 + 12	34	+1
3	Italy	4 + 8 + 8 + 11 + 12	43	+1
4	Germany	2 + 3 + 11 + 14 + 17	47	+4
5	Belgium	3 + 9 + 10 + 14 + 19	55	-
6	Switzerland	4 + 6 + 6 + 15 + 24	55	+3
7	Spain	2 + 4 + 7 + 22 + 24	59	-1
8	United States	5 + 10 + 16 + 16 + 18	65	-7
9	Slovenia	5 + 7 + 14 + 25 + 34	85	*
10	United Kingdom	13 + 15 + 17 + 21 + 23	89	-
11	Estonia	12 + 18 + 20 + 20 + 21	91	+8
12	Latvia	13 + 17 + 22 + 28 + 29	109	-1
13	South Africa	13 + 22 + 30 + 31 + 31	127	+5
14	New Zealand	23 + 26 + 26 + 30 + 32	137	+7
15	Czech Republic	26 + 27 + 30 + 32 + 35	150	*
16	Norway	21 + 24 + 34 + 38 + 40	157	-3
17	Brazil	27 + 29 + 32 + 35 + 36	159	+8
18	Finland	28 + 33 + 36 + 36 + 38	171	-4
19	Netherlands	9 + 9 + 11 + 15	44	-12
20	Sweden	19 + 23 + 31 + 33	106	-8
21	Portugal			*
22	Slovakia			*
23	Lithuania			-1
24	FIM Latin America			+6
25	Canada			-10
26	Chile			-10
27	Ireland			-4
28	Guam			-11
29	Mexico			-3
30	Croatia			*
31	Iceland			-3
32	Puerto Rico			*
33	Poland			*
34	Morocco			-2
35	Luxembourg			*
36	Ukraine			*
37	Greece			*
