= Kārlis Reišulis =

Latvian motocross racer

- Nationality: Latvian
- Born: 2 November 2005 (age 20) Gulbene, Latvia

Motocross career
- Years active: 2020–present
- Teams: Hamstra Racing Team (2020); Yamaha Europe EMX125 MJC (2021-2022); Hutten Metaal Yamaha Official Team (2023); Team VRT Yamaha Racing (2024); Monster Energy Yamaha Factory MX2 (2024–2026)

Kārlis Alberts Reišulis (born 2 November 2005) is a Latvian professional Motocross racer. Reišulis has competed full-time in the Motocross World Championship since midway through the 2024 season.

Reišulis has represented his country at the Motocross des Nations on five occasions, most recently at the 2026 event. During the 2026 event, the Latvian team recorded its highest overall position to date of fourth place. At the 2024 Motocross des Nations, he was awarded the Ricky Carmichael Award for the best young rider at the event.

He is the older brother of Jānis Reišulis, who is also a world-championship level motocross racer and two-time European champion. The pair have spent several years as teammates whilst racing in the MXGP paddock.

From 2021 to 2026, Reišulis was part of Yamaha's official teams. This saw him transition through EMX125, EMX250 and into MX2 with the manufacturer.

== Career ==
=== Junior career ===
After starting in the sport at a young age, Reišulis progressed through the junior ranks in Latvia and around Europe. After becoming MX50 Latvian champion in 2013, he got his first taste of international competition in 2015 when he scored five points in the EMX65 class 2015 European Motocross Championship. In 2016, he was able to improve to sixth in the EMX65 championship and take home the silver medal in the 65 class of the FIM Motocross Junior World Championship, held in Russia. Reišulis competed for a final time in EMX65 in 2017 but dropped to twelfth in the overall standings. A week later he returned to the FIM Junior Worlds but after a strong qualifying performance, did not finish the first race and was not able to start the second.

After competing in the MX85 class domestically in 2017, Reišulis made his full-time move to an 85cc motorcycle in 2018. On his debut in the EMX85 class of the 2018 European Motocross Championship, he scored three points. Reišulis also represented his country at the Motocross of European Nations, where the Latvian team finised seventh overall. In his second and final year on an 85 in 2019, Reišulis finished fourth overall in the EMX85 class of the 2019 European Motocross Championship and then fifth overall in the FIM Junior World Championship. He again travelled to the Motocross of European Nations with the Latvian team where, after winning his qualifying race, he finished third and sixth in the two 85 races. Additionally, Reišulis was crowned MX85 Senior Latvian champion in 2019. Reišulis also raced in the 85cc class of the Dutch Masters of Motocross, where he won three of the four rounds but still ended up as runner-up in the championship by a single point behind Cas Valk.

For his first season in the EMX125 class, Reišulis joined the Dutch-based Hamstra Racing Team. The COVID-19 pandemic-impacted season saw him miss several rounds but seventh overall at the fifth round demonstrated his potential. In addition to ending the season in fifteenth, Reišulis won the MX125 title in the Latvian Motocross Championship, where he rode for the Latvian-based Motofavorīts team. His potential was recognised by Yamaha during this season and for the 2021 European Motocross Championship, he was brought into the manufacturer's officially supported team in the EMX125 class. After missing the opening round of the EMX125 series, Reišulis pulled himself closer to the front as the season progressed, culminating in finishing second overall at the final two rounds. He combined a final position of seventh in the standings with finishing fifth overall in the FIM Junior World Championship in Greece and successfully defending his Latvian national title in the MX125 class.

Reišulis remained part of Yamaha's official EMX125 team for the 2022 European Motocross Championship, in what would be his last year in the class. He returned to the overall podium at the second and third rounds, with second overall at both, before taking his first race wins in the class at the French and German rounds. This, combined with two further podiums put him second in the final championship standings, just shy of fifty points behind eventual champion Cas Valk. Despite his second in the standings, some of his performances were overshadowed by his younger brother who took an overall win and three race wins to finish just behind him in third. Reišulis finished twelfth in his final FIM Junior World Championship, with a sixteenth in the second race harming his overall position. At just sixteen years of age, Reišulis made his debut representing his country at the 2022 Motocross des Nations. Competing in the MX2 class, his results contributed to the team ending the event eleventh overall.

=== 250 Career ===
==== 2023 ====
Staying within Yamaha's official structure, Reišulis made the move up to compete on a 250cc motorcycle for the 2023 European Motocross Championship. He had a consistent rookie campaign in the class, scoring eight top-five race finishes and scoring his maiden EMX250 podium at the final round in Great Britain. After ending the championship in eighth, Reišulis raced in his second Motocross des Nations, competing on a 450cc motorcycle in the Open class for the first time. The team finished twelfth in the final standings, with Reišulis not cracking the top-tenty in either main race.

==== 2024 ====
Reišulis had an inconsistent start to the 2024 European Motocross Championship, finishing in second in the first race at the opening round coupled with two non-finishes and another non-score across the first three rounds. He was able to finish second overall at his home round in Latvia, but by that stage, he was nearly one hundred points off the championship lead. Following this, Reišulis made his world championship debut, riding in the MX2 class at the Italian round where he scored three points. For the rest of the season, he was promoted to a full-time ride for the Monster Energy Yamaha Factory Team in MX2, after Andrea Bonacorsi had been moved up to MXGP earlier in the year. After finding his feet over the first few rounds, Reišulis became a consistent top-ten finisher from the Czech grand prix onwards. A fourth overall in Swizerland, where he finished second in the second race, was the standout result. The 2024 Motocross des Nations was the culmination of his season, where he guaranteed qualification to the main races for Latvia by winning the B-Final on a 250cc motorcycle, ahead of many riders on 450cc motorcycles. His finishes of twelfth and eighth in the main races not only contributed to the team finishing tenth overall, but also meant that he was awarded the Ricky Carmichael Award for the best young rider at the event.

==== 2025 ====
After his part campaign the previous year, Reišulis tackled his first full-time world championship campaign with Yamaha in the 2025 FIM Motocross World Championship. He was never able to quite match his form of the previous season, recording eight top-ten overall finishes and ending the season in eleventh. Reišulis made his fourth appearance for Latvia at the 2025 Motocross des Nations, stepping back up to ride on a 450cc motorcycle in the MXGP class. The team finished ninth overall, with his best performance in the main races being a nineteenth place.

==== 2026 ====
For his third year in the factory Yamaha MX2 team, Reišulis was joined by his younger brother, to spearhead a two rider effort. He had a significant step forward in form from the previous season, finishing consistently in the top-eight overall throughout the year. Reišulis recorded two third place race finishes, the first in front of his home crowd in Latvia and the second coming at the Czech round, where he also stood on the overall podium at world championship level for the first time. After finishing seventh in the final standings, one place behind his brother, Reišulis made his fifth appearance for Latvia at the 2026 Motocross des Nations. Again riding in the MXGP class, he finished eighth in his qualifying race, before finishing thirteenth and sixteenth in his two main races. This, along with the performances of his teammates, resulted in Latvia recording their highest ever overall finish at the event with fourth place. Alongside his world championship campaign, Reišulis competed in the 250cc class of the 2026 Dutch Masters of Motocross. After winning the opening round, he was consistent enough across the remaining rounds to take the title, six points ahead of his brother.

==== 2027 ====
Following the end of the 2026 season, it was announced that Yamaha would withdraw its MX2 factory team from 2027, meaning Reišulis and his brother would end their association with the manufacturer.

== Honours ==
Motocross des Nations

- Ricky Carmichael Motocross of Nations Youngest Rider Award: 2024 (gold)

FIM Motocross Junior World Championship

- 65: 2016 (silver)

European Motocross Championship

- EMX125: 2022 (silver)

Dutch Masters of Motocross

- 250cc: 2026 (gold)
- 85cc: 2019 (silver)

Latvian Motocross Championship

- MX125: 2020 & 2021 (gold)
- MX85 Senior: 2019 (gold) , 2018 (bronze)
- MX85: 2017 (bronze)
- MX65: 2016 (silver) , 2015 (bronze)
- MX50: 2013 (gold) 2014 (silver)

== Career statistics ==
=== Motocross des Nations ===
Year	Location	Nation	Class	Teammates	Team Overall	Individual Overall
2022	(United States) Red Bud	LAT	MX2	Kārlis Sabulis; Toms Macuks	11th	11th
2023	(France) Ernée	LAT	Open	Pauls Jonass; Jānis Reišulis	12th	12th
2024	(United Kingdom) Matterley Basin	LAT	MX2	Mairis Pumpurs; Edvards Bidzāns	10th	2nd
2025	(United States) Ironman	LAT	MXGP	Jānis Reišulis; Pauls Jonass	9th	13th
2026	(France) Ernée	LAT	MXGP	Jānis Reišulis; Pauls Jonass	4th	9th

=== FIM Motocross World Championship ===
==== By season ====
Season	Class	Number	Motorcycle	Team	Race	Race Wins	Overall Wins	Race Top-3	Overall Podium	Pts	Plcd
2024	MX2	47	Yamaha	Team VRT Yamaha Racing	2	0	0	0	0	259	14th
2024	MX2	47	Yamaha	Monster Energy Yamaha Factory MX2	20	0	0	1	0	259	14th
2025	MX2	47	Yamaha	Monster Energy Yamaha Factory MX2	38	0	0	0	0	356	11th
2026	MX2	47	Yamaha	Monster Energy Yamaha Factory MX2	38	0	0	2	1	555	7th
Total					98	0	0	3	1	1170	
