= Oriol Oliver =

Spanish motocross racer

- Nationality: Spanish
- Born: 4 June 2002 (age 24) Girona, Spain

Motocross career
- Years active: 2020–present
- Teams: Jezyk Racing Team (2020); Ghidinelli Racing Yamaha (2021); WZ Racing KTM (2021–2024); KTM BTS Racing Team (2025); Gabriel SS24 KTM (2025–present)

Oriol Oliver Vilar (born 4 June 2002) is a Spanish professional Motocross racer. He has competed in the Motocross World Championships full-time since the 2023 season, after making two wildcard appearances in 2020 and 2021.

Alongside his World Championship experience, Oliver has represented Spain at the Motocross des Nations on two occasions, in 2023 and 2024.

Oliver spent much of his European Championship and MX2 career competing for the German WZ Racing Team, where he also raced the ADAC MX Masters series, winning the Youngster Cup class in 2023. Additionally, he was Spanish champion in his younger years in the MX85 class and has finished second twice in the Elite-MX2 class as an adult.

Oliver is the younger brother of Roger Oliver, who has competed in the Spanish and European motocross championships.

== Career ==
=== Junior career ===
After starting in the sport at a young age, Oliver progressed through the junior ranks in Spain and around Europe. In 2013, he became Spanish champion in the Alevín 65cc class, finished eighth in the EMX65 class of the European Motocross Championship and competed at the FIM Motocross Junior World Championship. He moved up to compete on an 85cc motorcycle in 2014, where he finished eighth in the Spanish championship, with one race win. Staying on an 85 for 2015, Oliver began competing on a Kawasaki, which saw him finish runner-up in the Spanish Championship and compete again at both the European and Junior World Championships. In 2016, he became Spanish champion in the MX85 class and achieved a breakthrough result internationally by finishing as runner-up in the EMX85 class of the 2016 European Motocross Championship, behind Rene Hofer.

Staying with the same Kawasaki team, Oliver moved up to compete on a 125cc motorcycle in 2017, finishing third in the MX125 class of the Spanish championship. He also entered three rounds of the EMX125 European Championship, qualifying and scoring ten points in Portugal before fracturing his humerus in the second race. Oliver began his association with the KTM brand in 2018, signing for the Jezyk Racing Team, where he finished twenty-fifth in the EMX125 standings and fifth in the Spanish Championship. For the 2019 European Motocross Championship, the Spanish federation formed its own team, with Oliver's seventh in the final standings being their highest place individual rider. He finished fourth in the Spanish MX125 Championship, with a zero point score at the third round dropping him down the standings after taking maximum points at the first two rounds. Oliver also returned to the FIM Junior World Championship, finishing nineteenth in the 125 class and was part of the Spanish team that finished second at the Motocross of European Nations.

=== MX2 ===
==== 2020 ====
Oliver moved up to compete on a 250cc motorcycle for the 2020 European Motocross Championship. Once again riding for the Jezyk Racing Team, Oliver finished the COVID-19 pandemic impacted EMX250 championship in sixteenth, with two top-six race finishes being his best results. In addition, Oliver competed as a wildcard at the sixteenth round of the 2020 FIM Motocross World Championship, making his grand prix debut. He also proved his strong adaption to the larger capacity motorcycle in Spain, where he finished runner-up behind a dominant Rubén Fernández in the MX2 class.

==== 2021 ====
Oliver changed both team and motorcycle for 2021, starting the season under the awning of the Italian Ghidinelli Racing Yamaha team. After competing for the team at the pre-season Italian International Championship, Oliver would then leave the team after the first two rounds of the 2021 European Motocross Championship, stating that he needed a stronger bike than the squad could provide. He found a home at the German WZ KTM Racing team, ending the EMX250 season in eleventh, after picking up his first podium with second overall at the penultimate round. Oliver also rode at his home round of the 2021 FIM Motocross World Championship in the MX2 class, missing out on points in both races. Through his German team's connection, Oliver also competed in the final two rounds of the ADAC MX Masters Youngster Cup class.

==== 2022 ====
Staying at the WZ team for a second season, Oliver had a strong start to the 2022 European Motocross Championship, finishing fifth overall at the first two rounds. These results put him third in the standings ahead of the third round, however, an injury would see the rest of Oliver's campaign curtailed. After only riding in one further round he ended the season eighteenth. Returning towards the end of the year, Oliver was able to take a race win in the Youngster Cup at the final round of the ADAC MX Masters.

==== 2023 ====
In his third season racing for the WZ Racing Team, Oliver moved up to compete in all the European rounds of the 2023 FIM Motocross World Championship, in the MX2 class. Coming back from a season disturbed by injury, Oliver adapted to World Championship-level racing quickly, scoring ten top-ten race finishes. His best results came on the sand tracks, with a sixth in the opening race at the Finnish round being his high. Once again being entered into the Youngster Cup, Oliver came away as a dominant champion in the class at the ADAC MX Masters, winning the title by over a hundred points and clean sweeping all three races at three of the rounds. Winning the championship with one round to go, Oliver moved up to the Masters category for the season finale, finishing fifth overall on debut in the class. At the end of the season, after originally not being selected, Oliver was called up to represent Spain at the 2023 Motocross des Nations following an injury for the original MX2 rider David Braceras. After finishing eighth in his qualifying race, Oliver finished outside the top-twenty in both of his main races, as the team finished seventh overall.

==== 2024 ====
Oliver again lined up for the WZ KTM team for the 2024 FIM Motocross World Championship, this time also competing in all rounds except the penultimate event in China. Oliver has a strong pre-season, finishing second in the MX2 class of the two round Italian International Championship. He was again able to put in a consistent grand prix season following this, finishing twelfth in the final standings of the MX2 class and scoring thirteen top-ten race finishes. Oliver was again strong on sand tracks, scoring a sixth place in the opening race at the Latvian round. For the second year in a row, Oliver was selected to represent his country as the MX2 rider at the 2024 Motocross des Nations. With the event taking place in Great Britain, Oliver finished ninth in his qualifying race. After finishing outside the top-twenty in the first main race, his thirteenth in the second race was a key result that contributed to the team's fourth place in the final standings.

==== 2025 ====
With the WZ team disappearing from the MXGP paddock for 2025, Oliver found a home at the KTM BTS Racing Team. However, after three rounds of the 2025 FIM Motocross World Championship, he parted ways with the team due to financial issues. Oliver was able to find a place at Shaun Simpson's Gabriel SS24 KTM team for the remainder of the season, competing in both MX2 grand prix and the 2025 British Motocross Championship. It was as part of this team that Oliver posted some of his best results in MX2, including his only World Championship-level top three race finish to date. Coming at the first race at the British round, Oliver was actually leading before a crash dropped him back to third. He ended his final MX2 season in fourteenth in the final standings. Oliver was also able to finish third in the British Championship, despite missing two rounds, with six race wins and three overall wins.

Additionally, Oliver competed for KTM Spain in the 2025 Spanish Motocross Championship. Winning five of the seven rounds and taking ten race wins, he ultimately finished second in the standings by five points due to having to miss the main races at the fifth round. His British Championship commitments saw him compete in the qualifying race on the Saturday in Spain, before flying to the UK to race on the Sunday.

=== MXGP ===
==== 2026 ====
Due to his age, Oliver had to move up to compete on a 450cc motorcycle for 2026, staying with the same SS24 team to take on the full MXGP season. His season started strongly, with a third overall at the opening round of the pre-season Italian International Championship. Oliver settled into the MXGP class by scoring seven top-ten race finishes across the first twelve rounds. A crash at the twelfth round in Great Britain ended his rookie season in the class due to injury. Outside of world championship action, Oliver competed in the MX1 class of the 2026 British Motocross Championship, where he won the opening race of the year at the first round and took the overall win at the sixth round. Despite missing the final round due to his injury, Oliver finished the standings in third.

== Honours ==
ADAC MX Masters

- Youngster Cup: 2023 (gold)

British Motocross Championship

- MX1: 2026 (bronze)
- MX2: 2025 (bronze)

Spanish Motocross Championship

- Elite-MX2: 2020 & 2025 (silver)
- MX125: 2017 (bronze)
- MX85: 2016 (gold) , 2015 (silver)
- Alevín 65cc: 2013 (gold)

Italian International Championship

- MX2: 2024 (silver)

Motocross of European Nations

- Team Overall: 2019 Spain (silver)

== Career statistics ==
=== Motocross des Nations ===
Year	Location	Nation	Class	Teammates	Team Overall	Individual Overall
2023	(France) Ernée	ESP	MX2	Jorge Prado; Rubén Fernández	7th	12th
2024	(United Kingdom) Matterley Basin	ESP	MX2	Jorge Prado; Rubén Fernández	4th	8th

=== FIM Motocross World Championship ===
==== By season ====
Season	Class	Number	Motorcycle	Team	Race	Race Wins	Overall Wins	Race Top-3	Overall Podium	Pts	Plcd
2020	MX2	50	KTM	Jezyk Racing Team	2	0	0	0	0	0	N/A
2021	MX2	51	KTM	WZ Racing	2	0	0	0	0	0	N/A
2023	MX2	51	KTM	WZ Racing KTM	32	0	0	0	0	303	12th
2024	MX2	51	KTM	WZ Racing KTM	38	0	0	0	0	323	12th
2025	MX2	51	KTM	KTM BTS Racing Team	6	0	0	0	0	290	14th
2025	MX2	51	KTM	Gabriel SS24 KTM Factory Juniors	23	0	0	1	0	290	14th
2026	MXGP	83	KTM	Gabriel SS24 KTM	24	0	0	0	0	187	16th
Total					127	0	0	1	0	1103	
