= Zuidbroek =

Zuidbroek may refer to places in the Netherlands:

- Zuidbroek, Groningen, a village in Menterwolde
- Zuidbroek, South Holland, a hamlet in Bergambacht
