= Aaron Plessinger =

American motocross racer

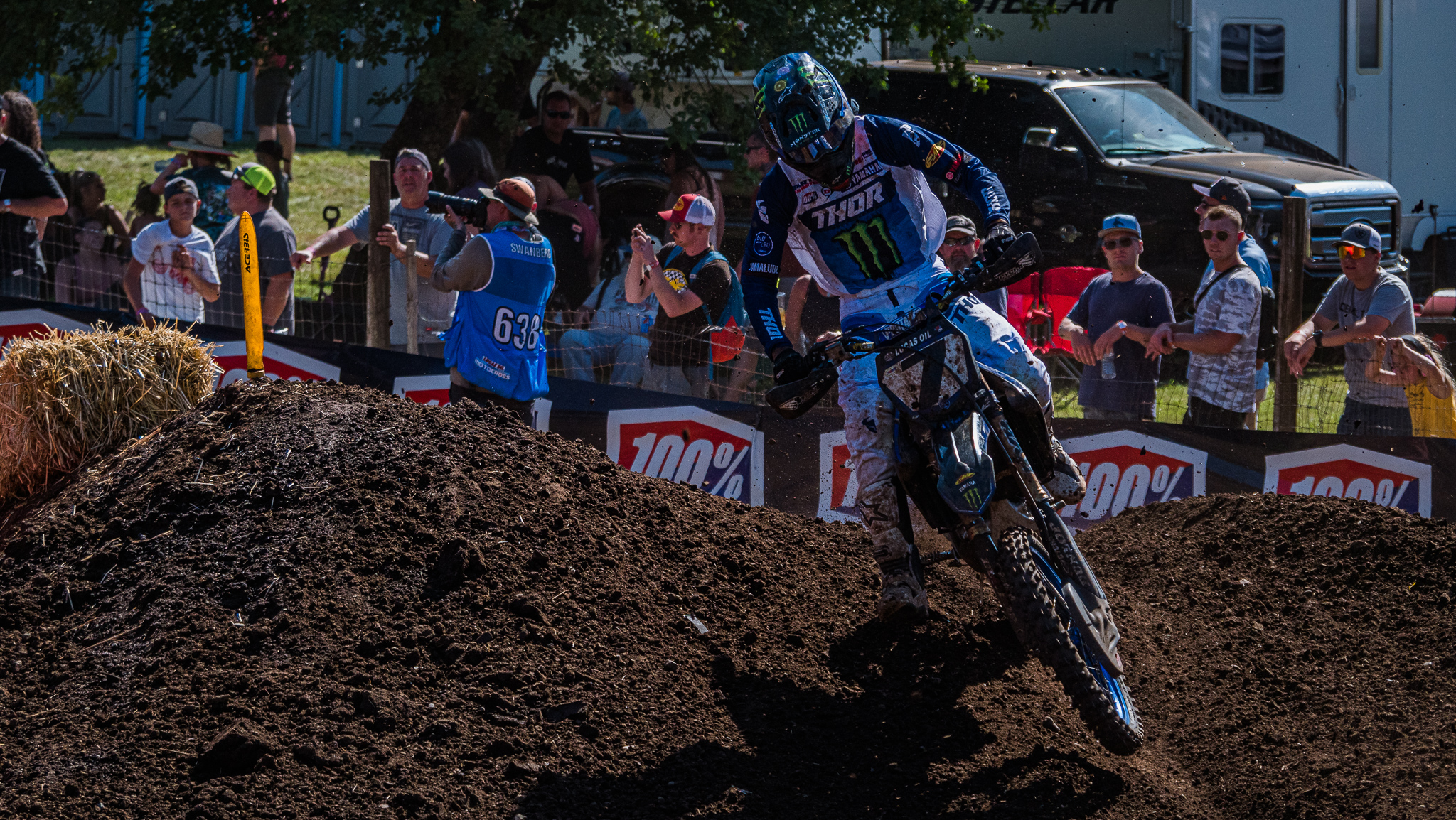
- Plessinger in 2021
- Nationality: American
- Born: January 25, 1996 (age 30) Hamilton, Ohio

Motocross career
- Years active: 2015–present
- Teams: •Monster Energy Yamaha Star Racing (2015-2021); •Red Bull KTM Factory Racing (2022-2026); •5.11 Triumph Factory Racing Team (2026–present)
- Championships: •2018 AMA Supercross 250cc West; •2018 AMA Motocross 250cc
- Wins: •AMA 250cc Supercross: 6; •AMA 250cc Motocross: 8; •AMA 450cc Supercross: 2; Total: 16

Aaron Plessinger (born January 25, 1996) is an American professional motocross and supercross racer. Plessinger has ridden professionally in the AMA Supercross Championship and the AMA Motocross Championship since 2015. He is a AMA Supercross 250cc West & AMA Motocross 250cc Champion.

In 2018, Plessinger became AMA Supercross Champion in the 250SX West class and the AMA Motocross Champion in the 250 class. Plessinger also represented his country in that season's Motocross des Nations.

Plessinger currently rides for the 5.11 Triumph Factory Racing Team, having signed for them at the end of the 2026 season. Previously, he has ridden for the Red Bull KTM Factory Racing and Monster Energy Yamaha Star Racing.

He has represented team USA three times at the Motocross des Nations, most recently at the 2024 edition.

== Career ==
=== 250 career ===
Plessinger began his professional career with the Yamalube Star Racing Yamaha team in 2015. Starting in the 250SX West category, Plessinger was able to finish in fifth place on his AMA Supercross Championship debut, a result he would repeat at the following round. He would go on to grab his first professional supercross podium a few rounds later in Anaheim, with a third behind Cooper Webb and Jessy Nelson. The 2015 AMA National Motocross Championship would continue Plessinger's impressive debut professional season, placing consistently in the top-ten before getting his first overall podium with third at Washougal. At the final round, Plessinger was able to record a second in the first race and won the second race to record his first overall victory in AMA Motocross.

The 2016 AMA Supercross Championship would see Plessinger move to the 250SX East class and eventually finish runner-up to champion Malcolm Stewart. As part of this he took his first professional supercross win in Indianapolis, alongside three other podiums. In the AMA motocross season, Plessinger would have a final championship position of fifth, including a race win at the final round. Plessinger swapped back to the 250SX West class for 2017, where he would finish third – picking up a win in Seattle and five other podiums. This would be backed up by his best motocross season yet, finishing fourth in the final 250 standings, picking up hid second overall win in Tennessee.

For Plessinger, 2018 would be his most successful season to date. He would clinch the 250SX West title, picking up four wins during a tight championship battle with Adam Cianciarulo. In the summer, Plessinger would win the 250 class in the 2018 AMA National Motocross Championship by 110 points over his nearest rival and with six overall wins to his name. Plessinger received his first call up to ride for his country at the 2018 Motocross des Nations, on home turf at Red Bud.

=== 450 career ===
Staying with Yamaha, Plessinger would move up to the 450 class for both supercross and motocross in 2019. He would have a consistent start to his maiden 450 class supercross campaign, with a best place of fifth in Atlanta. However, a broken heel sustained at the Daytona International Speedway round meant he missed the second half of the season, as well as the first half of his debut 450 motocross season. In the COVID-19 impacted 2020 supercross season, Plessinger 11th in the final standings with a best finish of sixth in Daytona. A wrist injury sustained training ahead of the outdoor season ruled him out for the entire 2020 AMA National Motocross Championship. 2021 would be Plessinger's last season on a Yamaha. He significantly improved in the 450 class in supercross, finishing fifth in the final standings and a podium at Daytona. He had a strong start to the 2021 AMA National Motocross Championship, with a third overall at the opening round. This result was repeated at round four, however he missed the final part of the season due to injury.

For 2022, Plessinger signed a two-year deal with the Red Bull KTM Factory Racing team. He made a strong start to the 2022 AMA Supercross Championship, with a second place at round two. However, a practice crash before round eight ruled him out of the rest of the supercross season with a broken arm. He managed to return to fitness for the AMA motocross season, where he picked up two podiums on the way to seventh overall in the final standings. Plessinger began his 2023 by finishing in seventh in the final standings of the 2023 AMA Supercross Championship. This included two podiums and leading the majority of the Detroit round before crashing out. He had his best 450 class motocross season during the 2023 AMA National Motocross Championship, finishing in third in the final standings. In a depleted field, Plessinger was able to pick up three overall podiums and following the end-of-season playoffs, finished fifth in the inaugural 2023 SuperMotocross World Championship. On the back of this, he earned his second call-up to represent the USA at the Motocross des Nations. He started with the number one plate due to the team being defending champions, and posted the best individual result of the weekend by placing fifth in Sunday's opening race. The team eventually finished eighth overall.

Plessinger started off 2024 strong, with multiple top five finishes and taking his first 450 supercross win at the third round in San Diego. For the first time in his career, this made him the championship leader in the 450SX class. He held the lead after finishing third at the fourth round but would lose it after the fifth round in Detroit. A further third would follow at the seventh round in Arlington, before a crash in the first qualifying session at round thirteen in Foxborough, Massachusetts resulted in a fractured elbow. This ruled him out for the remainder of the supercross season. Returning for the 2024 AMA National Motocross Championship, Plessinger carried on his good form, picking up six overall podium finishes and finishing third in the 450 standings for the second year running. This performance was enough to see him be picked to represent his country at the 2024 Motocross des Nations, marking his third appearance at the event. Finishing seventh and eighth in his two races, Plessinger was part of the team that finished in the runner-up spot behind Australia.

After a tough start to the 2025 AMA Supercross Championship, with two non-finishes across the first three rounds, Plessinger was able to record four third places and a win in the mud in Foxborough. These results saw him finish sixth in the final standings. He followed this up with a strong start to the 2025 AMA National Motocross Championship, finished second overall at the second round and third overall at the third round. Ongoing health issues revolving around low cortisol levels resulted in Plessinger missing the final four rounds of the championship and the three SuperMotocross playoff rounds. Returning for the 2026 AMA Supercross Championship, Plessinger recorded several finishes in the lower-half of the top-ten during the opening rounds of the season. A crash at the round in Birmingham, Alabama caused a labral tear in his hip, ruling him out for the rest of the supercross season. Returning for the 2026 AMA National Motocross Championship, Plessinger again suffered a mid-season injury, picking up a laceration on his tailbone which required stitching. He returned for the final three rounds and ended the series in twelfth in the final standings. This was coupled with tenth in the 2026 SuperMotocross World Championship playoff rounds standings but his time at the factory KTM was to come to an end. Following the playoffs, Plessinger signed for 5.11 Triumph Factory Racing Team, for the manufacturers second season racing in the 450 class in America.

== Honors ==
Motocross des Nations

- Team Overall: 2024 (United States) (silver)

AMA Supercross Championship

- 250SX West: 2018 (gold) , 2017 (bronze)
- 250SX East: 2016 (silver)

AMA Motocross Championship

- 450: 2023 & 2024 (bronze)
- 250: 2018 (gold)

== AMA Supercross/Motocross results ==
Year	Rnd 1	Rnd 2	Rnd 3	Rnd 4	Rnd 5	Rnd 6	Rnd 7	Rnd 8	Rnd 9	Rnd 10	Rnd 11	Rnd 12	Rnd 13	Rnd 14	Rnd 15	Rnd 16	Rnd 17	Average Finish	Podium Percent	Place
2016 250 SX-E	-	-	-	-	-	-	-	3	5	12	2	-	1	2	5	5	4	4.33	44%	2nd
2017 SX-W	2	3	2	4	6	3	-	-	-	-	-	-	-	1	DNF	-	3	3.00	75%	3rd
2018 SX-W	2	1	6	1	1	8	-	-	-	-	-	5	1	-	-	4	8	3.70	50%	1st
2018 250 MX	3	1	6	1	7	5	1	1	1	2	3	1	-	-	-	-	-	2.67	75%	1st
2023 450 MX	4	4	2	8	4	4	4	5	5	2	3	-	-	-	-	-	-	4.09	27%	3rd
2024 450 SX	4	5	1	3	6	10	3	18	8	6	4	4	OUT	OUT	OUT	OUT	OUT	6.00	25%	11th
2024 450 MX	8	3	6	4	6	2	4	2	3	3	2	-	-	-	-	-	-	3.91	55%	3rd
2025 450 SX	9	DNF	DNF	9	8	9	7	3	5	3	3	1	8	3	4	5	6	5.53	33%	6th
2025 450 MX	4	2	3	4	7	12	DNF	OUT	OUT	OUT	OUT	-	-	-	-	-	-	5.33	33%	8th
2026 450 SX	10 ANA (California)	7 SDI (California)	DNF ANA (California)	13 HOU (Texas)	8 GLE (Arizona)	7 SEA (Washington (state))	8 ARL (Texas)	6 DAY (Florida)	DNF IND (Indiana)	OUT BIR (Alabama)	OUT DET (Michigan)	OUT STL (Missouri)	OUT NAS (Tennessee)	OUT CLE (Ohio)	OUT PHI (Pennsylvania)	OUT DEN (Colorado)	OUT SLC (Utah)	8.42	-	16th
2026 450 MX	8 FOX (California)	16 HAN (California)	7 THU (Colorado)	5 HIG (Pennsylvania)	DNF RED (Michigan)	OUT SOU (Massachusetts)	OUT SPR (Minnesota)	OUT WAS (Washington (state))	DNF UNA (New York (state))	7 BUD (Maryland)	8 IRN (Indiana)	-	-	-	-	-	-	8.50	-	12th

== SMX Results ==
Year	Rnd 1	Rnd 2	Rnd 3	Average Finish	Podium Percent	Place
2023 450 SMX	6 CON (North Carolina)	4 CHI (Illinois)	12 LAC (California)	7.33	-	5th
2024 450 SMX	8 CON (North Carolina)	7 FOR (Texas)	4 LVE (Nevada)	6.33	-	4th
2025 450 SMX	OUT CON (North Carolina)	OUT STL (Missouri)	OUT LVE (Nevada)	-	-	-
2026 450 SMX	7 COL (Ohio)	11 LOS (California)	10 RID (Missouri)	9.33	-	10th
