= Romain Febvre =

French motorcycle racer

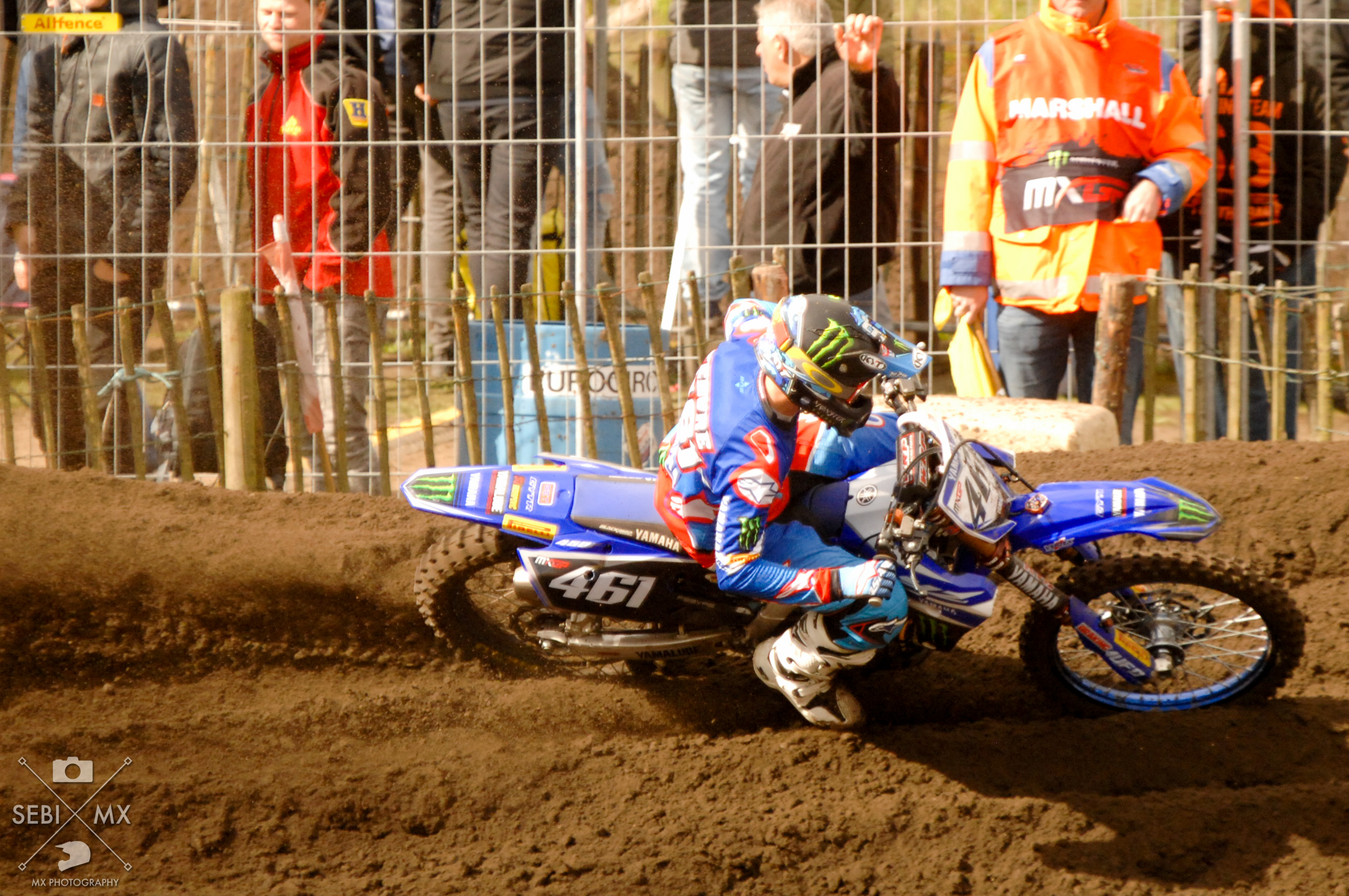
- Febvre in 2017
- Nationality: French
- Born: 31 December 1991 (age 34) Epinal, France

Motocross career
- Years active: 2012-Present
- Teams: •Bodo Smchidt KTM (2011-2012); •Wilvo Nestaan JM Racing KTM (2013); •Wilvo Nestaan Husqvarna Factory Racing (2014); •Monster Energy Yamaha MXGP (2014-2019); •MXGP Kawasaki Racing Team (2019-2026); •Red Bull Ducati Factory MXGP Team (2027)
- Championships: •2011 EMX 250cc; •2015 MXGP; •2025 MXGP
- Wins: •MX2: 1; •MXGP: 25
- GP debut: 2012, GP of Netherlands, MX2
- First GP win: 2014, GP of State of Goias, MX2

Romain Febvre (born 31 December 1991) is a French professional motocross racer.He has competed in the FIM Motocross World Championships since 2012 and is a two-time MXGP World Champion. He was a member of the winning French team at the Motocross des Nations in 2015, 2016, 2017 & 2023.

== Motocross career ==
Born in Epinal, France, Febvre competed in motocross and supermoto as a youth, winning the 2007 French 125cc Supermoto national championship. In 2011, he won the 2011 European Motocross Championship. He then progressed to the MX2 class of the world championship with his best result being a third-place finish in the 2014 MX2 championship while riding for the Wilvo Nestaan Husqvarna Factory Racing team.

=== 2015 ===
In his debut MXGP season, Febvre clinched the world title with two rounds to spare. Riding for Yamaha Factory Racing Yamalube, he secured 15 moto wins and eight overall GP victories including the MXGP of France. He was the first rookie to win the premier class championship since 2007.

=== 2016 ===
Febvre finished fourth in the championship standings, and contributed to Team France's victory at the Motocross of Nations.

=== 2017 ===
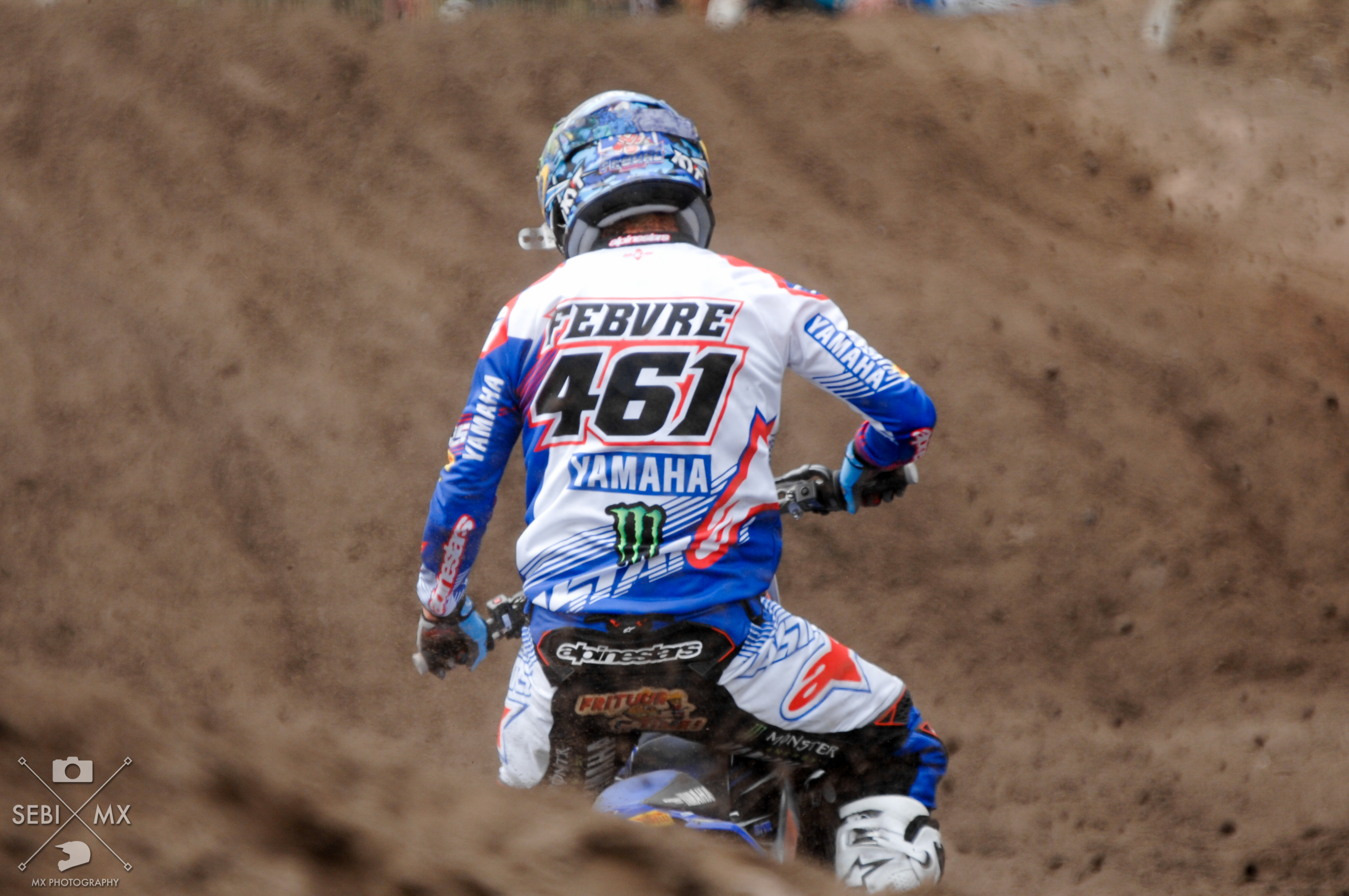
Febvre in 2017

Febvre finished sixth overall and contributed to France's win at the Motocross of Nations.

=== 2018 ===
Continuing with Yamaha, Febvre secured another sixth place finish in the championship. While not reaching the podium as frequently, he remained a competitive force within the series.

=== 2019 ===
Febvre's 2019 season was marred by injuries, including a broken ankle at the season opener in Argentina, causing him to miss several rounds. Despite these challenges, Febvre won at the Czech Republic GP. Post-season, he parted ways with Yamaha after five years.

=== 2020 ===
Joining the Kawasaki Racing Team, Febvre adapted quickly, securing his first GP win with the team at the MXGP of Città di Mantova. His performance throughout the season earned him a commendable fourth place in the championship standings.

=== 2021 ===
Febvre had a standout season, engaging in a fierce title battle that went down to the final round in Mantova. He narrowly missed clinching the championship, finishing as runner-up, but his efforts solidified his reputation as a top contender in the series.

=== 2022 ===
Injuries significantly impacted Febvre's season, limiting his participation and performance. Consequently, he concluded the year 14th in the overall standings, a setback in an otherwise illustrious career.

=== 2023 ===
Bouncing back impressively, Febvre secured six GP victories and stood on the podium in 13 rounds. His consistent high-level performance earned him the silver medal in the championship. Additionally, he played a pivotal role in Team France's triumph at the Motocross of Nations.

=== 2024 ===
Febvre started the season strongly, achieving six podiums in the first seven rounds. However, a thumb injury during the French GP forced him to miss several rounds, affecting his championship bid. Despite this, he managed to finish fifth overall and contributed to Team France's fourth place at the Motocross of Nations.

=== 2025 ===
In 2025, Febvre became Kawasaki’s first rider to win the premier class MXGP World Championship and their first title since Christophe Pourcel winning MX2 in 2006. He opened the season with a moto win and a podium in Argentina. After championship leader Tim Gajser crashed out at round 6 in Switzerland, Febvre took the points lead the following Grand Prix and a 43-point lead over his nearest rival, MXGP class rookie Lucas Coenen. For the next eight rounds, Febvre and Coenen engaged in a tight points battle with Coenen gaining small advantages across these races. Going into round 16 in Sweden, Coenen closed the gap to a mere nine points, but after that Febvre gained all 60 points with 1–1-1 scores and rebuilt his championship lead to 41 points. By the final round in Darwin, Australia, Febvre had a 47-point lead over his closest rival, and when adverse weather led to the cancellation of the second moto, his position was secure enough to clinch the title with the first moto.

== MXGP Results ==
Year	Rnd 1	Rnd 2	Rnd 3	Rnd 4	Rnd 5	Rnd 6	Rnd 7	Rnd 8	Rnd 9	Rnd 10	Rnd 11	Rnd 12	Rnd 13	Rnd 14	Rnd 15	Rnd 16	Rnd 17	Rnd 18	Rnd 19	Rnd 20	Average Finish	Podium Percent	Place
2012 MX2	20	18	DNF	OUT	OUT	10	8	13	11	9	16	5	15	17	6	7	-	-	-	-	11.92	-	13th
2013 MX2	3	2	10	OUT	OUT	OUT	OUT	OUT	DNF	21	11	5	13	14	10	5	4	5	-	-	7.92	17%	12th
2014 MX2	3	5	7	5	5	2	4	5	4	6	5	5	6	4	4	1	4	-	-	-	4.41	18%	3rd
2015 MXGP	6	4	7	4	7	3	3	1	1	1	1	3	1	3	1	2	1	1	-	-	2.77	72%	1st
2016 MXGP	2	1	1	4	2	3	5	2	6	1	OUT	OUT	3	13	3	9	7	15	-	-	4.81	56%	4th
2017 MXGP	5	18	5	9	13	8	13	5	6	6	4	4	6	8	4	2	DNF	2	4	-	7.00	11%	6th
2018 MXGP	5	5	4	4	4	4	11	5	3	5	5	3	16	4	4	2	5	OUT	OUT	OUT	5.11	18%	6th
2019 MXGP	12	OUT	OUT	OUT	8	3	OUT	5	2	8	2	13	1	2	7	10	OUT	OUT	-	-	6.08	42%	9th
2020 MXGP	OUT	OUT	3	5	5	4	5	5	6	1	6	3	4	4	2	9	3	2	-	-	4.01	38%	4th
2021 MXGP	3	4	5	3	5	1	4	4	4	3	3	2	4	4	3	3	2	3	-	-	3.33	56%	2nd
2022 MXGP	OUT	OUT	OUT	OUT	OUT	OUT	OUT	OUT	OUT	OUT	5	4	19	4	4	7	4	3	-	-	6.25	13%	14th
2023 MXGP	4	7	3	7	2	OUT	2	3	5	1	1	1	1	1	2	1	2	9	3	-	3.06	72%	2nd
2024 MXGP	2	3	5	2	2	3	2	OUT	OUT	OUT	OUT	OUT	6	3	4	5	5	4	2	4	3.47	53%	5th
2025 MXGP	2	5	2	1	2	2	2	1	1	3	3	1	2	2	2	1	5	3	4	4	2.40	80%	1st
2026 MXGP	2 ARG	8 AND	5 SUI	4 SAR	6 TRE	3 FRA	10 GER	3 LAT	5 ITA	3 POR	3 RSA	2 GBR	3 CZE	9 FLA	2 SWE	7 NED	3 TUR	2 CHN	2 AUS	-	4.31	58%	2nd

Preceded by Tony Cairoli	Motocross World Championship; MXGP Champion; 2015	Succeeded by Tim Gajser
