= Tim Gajser =

Slovenian motocross racer

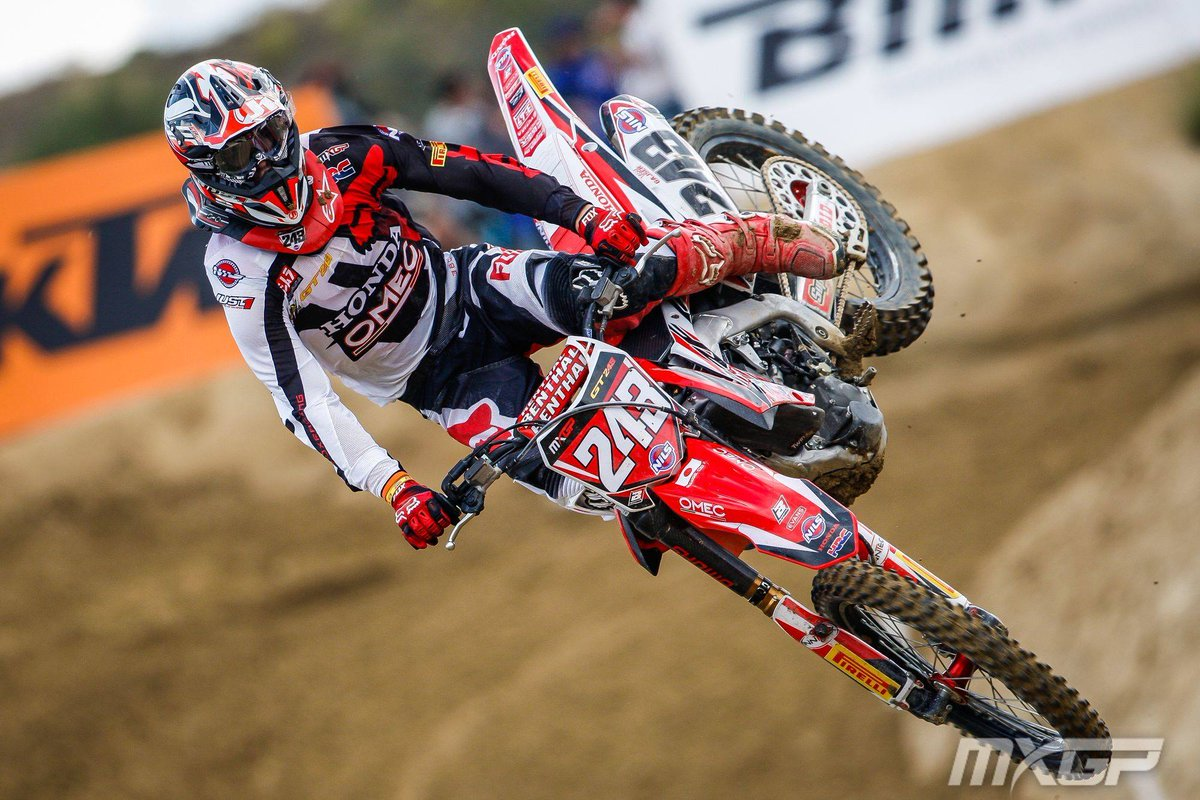
- Gajser in 2019
- Nationality: Slovenian
- Born: 8 September 1996 (age 30) Makole, Slovenia

Motocross career
- Years active: 2012–present
- Teams: •KTM (2009–2013); •HRC Honda (2014–2025); •Monster Energy Yamaha Factory MXGP Team (2026-Present)
- Championships: •2007 EMX 65cc; •2009 EMX 85cc; •2012 EMX 125cc; •2012 FIM 125cc; •2015 MX2; •2016 MXGP; •2019 MXGP; •2020 MXGP; •2022 MXGP
- Wins: •MXGP: 47; •MX2: 5; •Total: 52
- GP debut: 2012, GP of Europe, Faenza, MX2
- First GP win: 2015, MXGP of Trentino, Pietramurata, MX2

Tim Gajser (born 8 September 1996) is a Slovenian professional motocross racer. He has competed in the FIM Motocross World Championships since 2012. Gajser is a four-time MXGP & a MX2 World Champion. Gajser ranks fifth on the all-time list of FIM Motocross World Championship Grand Prix wins.

Gajser signed and raced for Honda from 2014 to 2025. A relationship lasting 11 years included 4 MXGP & 1 MX2 Motocross World Championships.

== Motocross career ==
Gajser previously competed for the Gariboldi Honda motocross racing team managed by Giacomo Gariboldi.

=== 2015 ===
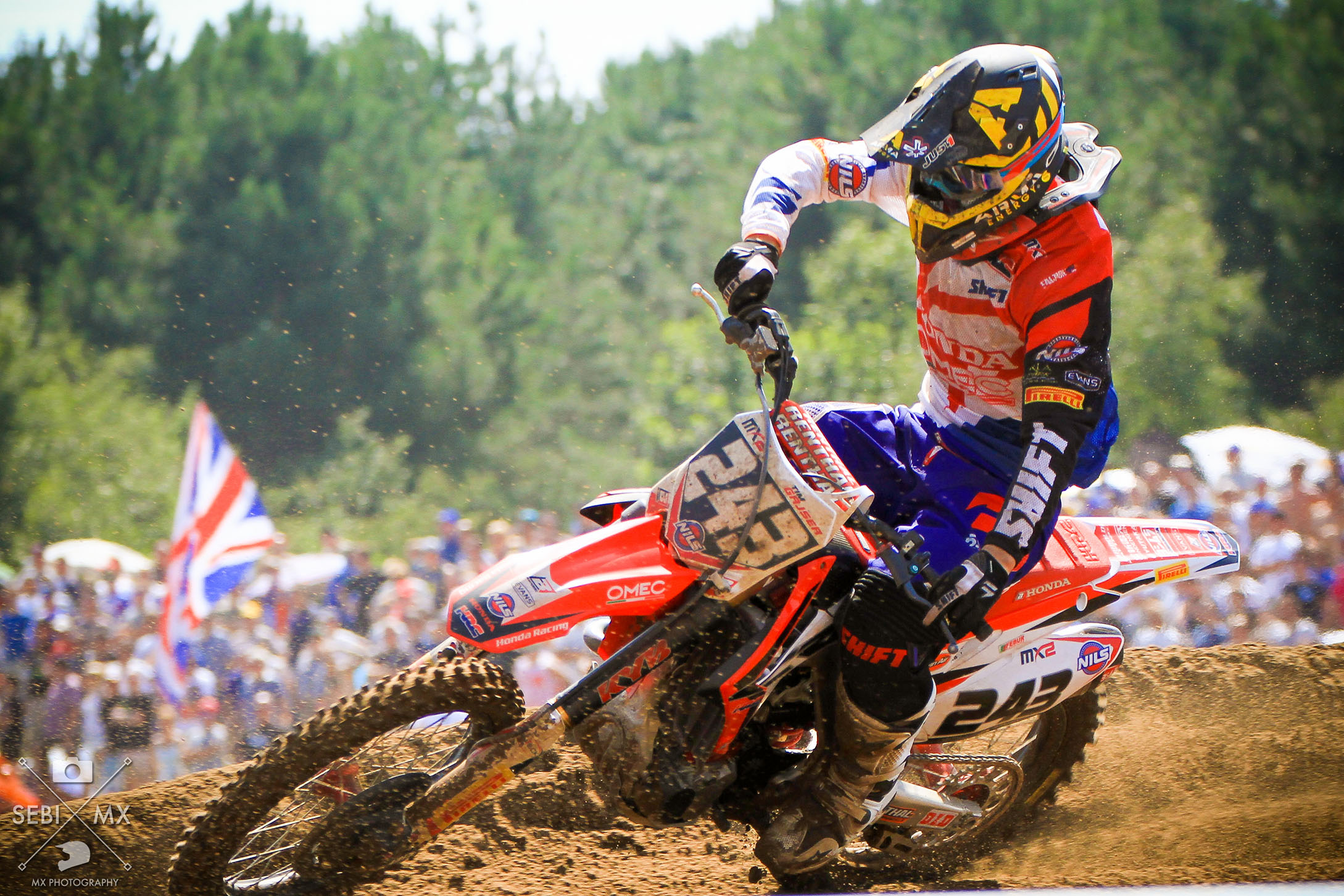
Gajser in 2015 at the MXGP of Lommel, Belgium

In 2015, Gajser won his first World Championship in the MX2 class. He won five Grand Prix's that year and finished on the podium eight out of 18 rounds.

=== 2016 ===
2016 was Gajser's rookie year in the MXGP class. He won the opening round in Qatar & from then onward, would rack up six more wins as well as ten podium finishes on his way to the 2016 MXGP World Championship.

=== 2019 ===
In 2019, Gajser won his second MXGP World Championship. 18 rounds were contested, and Gajser won nine of those and finished on the podium 15 times.

=== 2020 ===
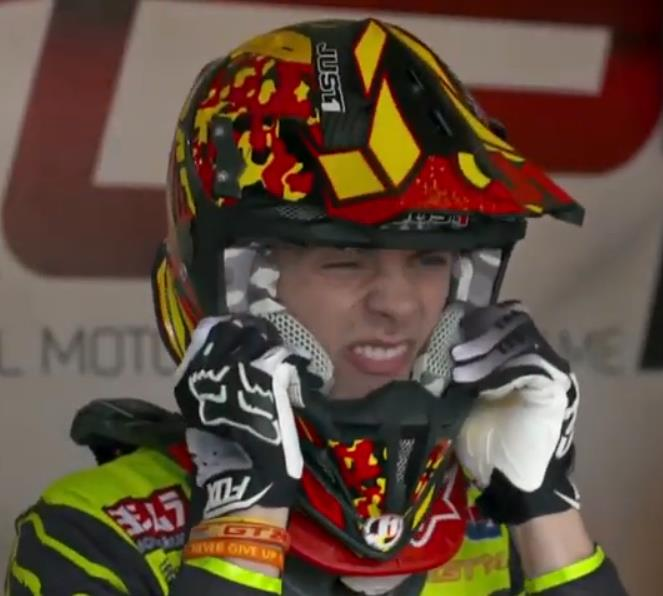
Gajser in 2020.

In 2020, Gajser became the first rider since Antonio Cairoli in 2014, to defend the MXGP World Championship. He won five GP's and finished on the podium 14 out of 18 rounds.

=== 2022 ===
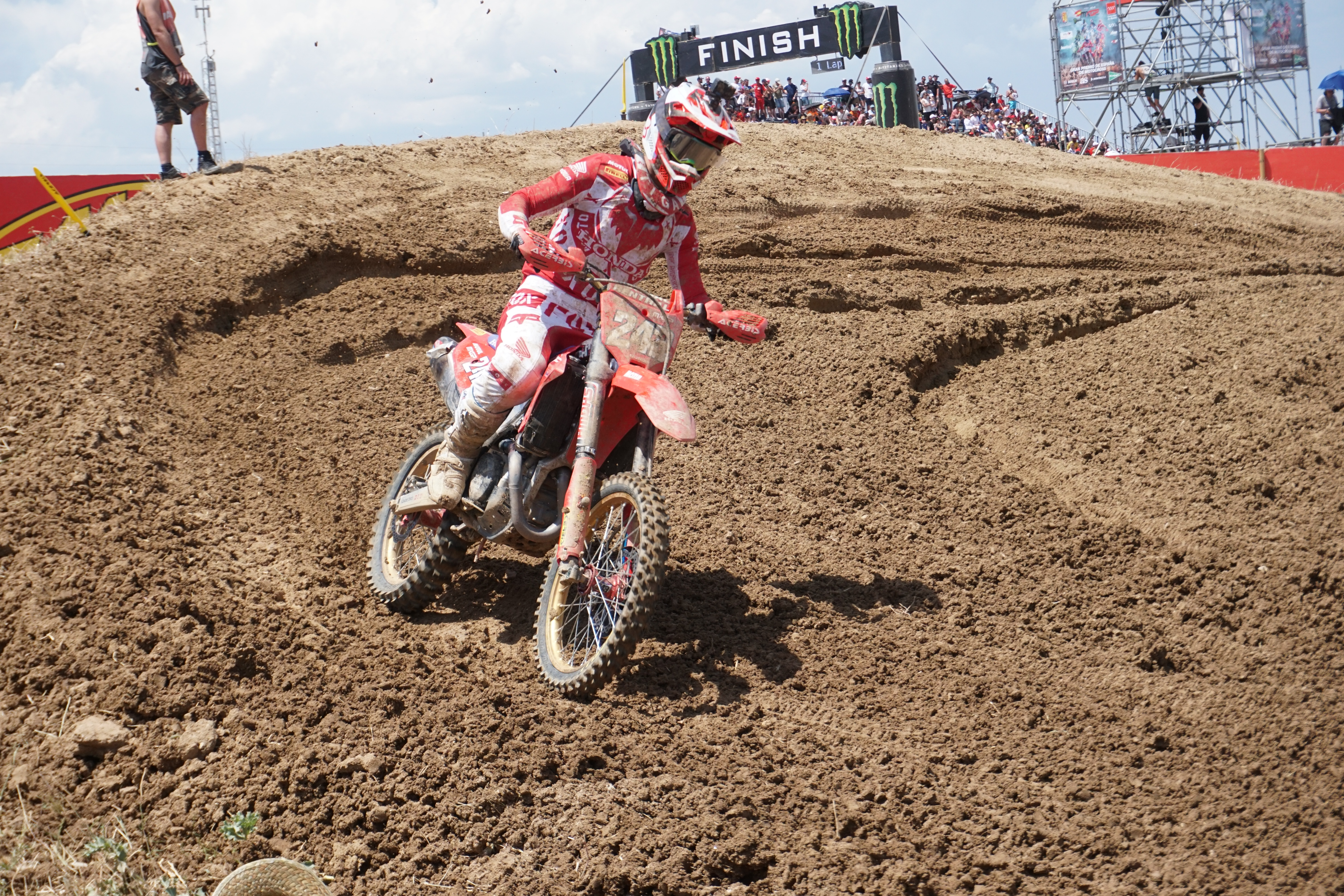
Gajser in 2022.

In 2022, Gajser won his fourth MXGP World Championship at round 16 in Hyvinkää, Finland. He won ten Grand Prix's and finished on the podium 13 times out of 18 rounds.

=== 2023 ===
Gajser suffered a broken right femur during a round of the Italian Championship in Trentino. This sidelined him for the majority of the 2023 FIM Motocross World Championship. He returned at round 12 and would finish the season 11th with two wins.

=== 2024 ===
Throughout the 2024 MXGP World Championship, Gajser showcased his speed and consistency, leading the points for a majority of the season. Going into the first moto of round 19/20, Gajser held a 14 point lead over Jorge Prado. After a first turn crash, Gajser broke a footpeg which relegated him to 17th, whereas Prado took a second place. Gajser would finish second in race two, Prado took the overall victory & a seven point lead for the final round. Gajser fell short of the 2024 MXGP Championship by ten points. He ended the season second in the championship, with four GP wins, 16 podiums & one finish outside the top-four which was the result of his broken footpeg at round 19.

== Personal life ==
Gajser was born in Ptuj, Slovenia, and is a native of Makole, a small settlement roughly 20 kilometers to the southwest. His father Bogomir was also a motocross rider and introduced his son to the sport at a young age. He remains his coach to this day.

Gajser has one older brother Nejc, and two younger sisters Alja and Neja. In 1995, ĭhis family went through a tragedy when his three-year-old brother Žan was killed in a racing accident. During a race, the young boy wandered on a track below one of the jumps and was hit in the temple by his father's motorcycle during landing and killed instantly. Gajser rides with the number 243 in honor of his deceased brother, who was born on 24 March.

Gajser maintains a close friendship with MotoGP world champion Marc Marquez, having met the Spaniard through their mutual relationship with Honda Racing Corporation. Despite having ridden motorcycles since he was three years old, Gajser does not have a motorcycle license and has never ridden a motorcycle on public roads.

== MXGP Results ==
Year	Rnd 1	Rnd 2	Rnd 3	Rnd 4	Rnd 5	Rnd 6	Rnd 7	Rnd 8	Rnd 9	Rnd 10	Rnd 11	Rnd 12	Rnd 13	Rnd 14	Rnd 15	Rnd 16	Rnd 17	Rnd 18	Rnd 19	Rnd 20	Average Finish	Podium Percent	Place
2014 MX2	9	18	5	7	8	10	7	3	7	5	2	3	2	6	5	3	2	-	-	-	6.00	35%	5th
2015 MX2	4	11	5	1	17	5	OUT	2	1	1	1	5	10	6	2	1	2	4	-	-	4.58	47%	1st
2016 MXGP	1	3	2	3	1	1	1	2	3	1	2	1	1	2	5	2	DNF	2	3	-	2.00	94%	1st
2017 MXGP	2	7	1	1	2	5	17	11	OUT	OUT	10	6	3	11	6	1	4	29	2	-	6.94	41%	5th
2018 MXGP	OUT	9	6	7	3	5	5	2	5	3	4	4	2	3	7	6	2	2	5	2	4.31	42%	4th
2019 MXGP	2	2	3	1	1	1	6	1	1	1	1	1	2	1	3	2	4	4	-	-	2.05	83%	1st
2020 MXGP	2	2	2	13	8	6	2	2	4	3	1	2	1	2	1	2	1	1	-	-	3.05	78%	1st
2021 MXGP	1	2	7	1	6	6	1	3	2	12	1	3	3	3	2	2	4	2	-	-	3.39	72%	3rd
2022 MXGP	1	1	1	2	1	1	1	7	4	4	1	1	3	7	2	6	1	1	-	-	2.50	72%	1st
2023 MXGP	OUT	OUT	OUT	OUT	OUT	OUT	OUT	OUT	OUT	OUT	OUT	7	15	6	10	5	1	5	1	-	6.25	25%	11th
2024 MXGP	3	2	2	3	3	4	1	2	2	1	4	2	1	4	2	3	1	2	7	2	2.55	80%	2nd
2025 MXGP	3	1	1	3	1	9	OUT	OUT	OUT	OUT	OUT	OUT	OUT	OUT	OUT	12	4	4	2	3	3.91	64%	9th
2026 MXGP	4 ARG (Argentina)	3 AND (Andalusia)	3 SUI (Switzerland)	8 SAR (Sardinia)	2 TRE	9 FRA (France)	7 GER (Germany)	4 LAT (Latvia)	9 ITA (Italy)	4 POR (Portugal)	5 RSA (South Africa)	3 GBR (United Kingdom)	5 CZE (Czech Republic)	3 FLA (Flanders)	5 SWE (Sweden)	4 NED (Netherlands)	4 TUR (Turkey)	OUT CHN (China)	OUT AUS (Australia)	-	4.82	29%	3rd

Preceded by Romain Febvre	Motocross World Championship; MXGP Champion; 2016	Succeeded by Tony Cairoli
