= Italian Prestige Motocross Championship =

Italian Motocross Championship

- Category: Motocross
- Country: Italy
- Inaugural season: 2009

The Italian Prestige Motocross Championship (Italian: Campionato Italiano Motocross Prestige) is the premier domestic Italian Motocross series, sanctioned by the Federazione Motociclistica Italiana.

The series runs annually throughout the spring and summer months. The premier classes are the Elite MX1 and Elite MX2 but there is also a secondary 'Fast' classes for riders of a lower level.

== History ==
Motocross has a long history in Italy and national championships for the sport have been staged every year since 1950. The structure and classes evolved over time in line with what has been seen in the sport around the world.

The 'prestige' moniker was first adopted ahead of the 2009 season, with the 'Elite' and 'Fast' classifications first being contested in the 2018 season. Alessandro Lupino is the most successful rider in the championship since it adopted the 'prestige' moniker with six titles to his name.

== Event Format ==
Rounds of the Italian Prestige Motocross Championship typically have a two-day format. The MX1 and MX2 classes hold their qualifying sessions on the Saturday, with the field in both classes split into two groups each. The top-20 riders in each group are then qualified for the 'Group A' races, whilst the remaining riders go into the 'Group B' races. Each groups get two races each, with Group B having their first race on the Saturday.

Points are awarded to finishers of both Group A and Group B races:

Place	1	2	3	4	5	6	7	8	9	10	11	12	13	14	15	16	17	18	19	20	21	22	23	24	25	26	27	28	29	30	31	32	33	34	35	36	37	38	39	40
Group A	250	210	170	140	120	110	100	90	85	80	77	74	72	70	68	66	64	63	62	61	60	59	58	57	56	55	54	53	52	51	50	49	48	47	46	45	44	43	42	41
Group B	40	39	38	37	36	35	34	33	32	31	30	29	28	27	26	25	24	23	22	21	20	19	18	17	16	15	14	13	12	11	10	9	8	7	6	5	4	3	2	1

Riders within both classes are given the designation of being either an 'Elite' category rider or a 'Fast' category rider. Although riding in the same race as each other, the points obtained by a rider contributes to their score within their respective category. All non-Italian riders are automatically classified in the Elite category.

== Broadcast ==
The comprehensive broadcast of each round of the Italian Prestige Motocross Championship is currently via a live stream on the FXAction YouTube channel. From the 2024 season, the second race of each class will be broadcast on the RAI network.

== List of Champions ==
Season	MX1 Elite Champion	MX2 Elite Champion
2026	(Slovenia) Jan Pancar (KTM)	(Italy) Valerio Lata (Honda)
2025	(Sweden) Isak Gifting (Yamaha)	(Italy) Valerio Lata (Honda)
2024	(Italy) Alessandro Lupino (Ducati)	(Italy) Valerio Lata (Gas Gas)
2023	(Italy) Alberto Forato (KTM)	(Netherlands) Cas Valk (Fantic)
2022	(Italy) Alberto Forato (Gas Gas)	(Slovenia) Jan Pancar (KTM)
2021	(Italy) Alessandro Lupino (KTM)	(Italy) Nicholas Lapucci (Fantic)
2020	(Italy) Nicholas Lapucci (KTM)	(Italy) Mattia Guadagnini (Husqvarna)
2019	(Italy) Samuele Bernardini (Yamaha)	(Italy) Mattia Guadagnini (Husqvarna)
2018	(Italy) Alessandro Lupino (Kawasaki)	(Italy) Michele Cervellin (Yamaha)
2017	(Italy) Alessandro Lupino (Honda)	(Italy) Michele Cervellin (Honda)
2016	(Italy) Alessandro Lupino (Honda)	(Italy) Michele Cervellin (Honda)
2015	(Italy) Alessandro Lupino (Honda)	(Italy) Ivo Monticelli (KTM)
2014	(Italy) Cristian Beggi (Honda)	(Italy) Michele Cervellin (Honda)
2013	(Italy) Pier Filippo Bertuzzo (Yamaha)	(Italy) Samuel Zeni (Yamaha)
2012	(Italy) Felice Compagnone (Honda)	(Italy) Alessandro Battig (Yamaha)
2011	(Italy) Cristian Beggi (TM)	(Italy) Matteo Aperio (Honda)
2010	(Italy) Felice Compagnone (Honda)	(Italy) Andrea Cervellin (Husqvarna)
2009	(Italy) Felice Compagnone (Honda)	(Italy) Matteo Aperio (Honda)
