= 2025 Italian Prestige Motocross Championship =

Italian National Motocross Competition in 2025

The 2025 Italian Prestige Motocross Championship season was the 17th edition of the Italian Motocross Championship carrying the 'Prestige' moniker.

The series consisted of six rounds, running from March to late September. Alessandro Lupino was the reigning champion in the MX1 Elite class, after winning sixth prestige title in 2024. He did not defend his title however, as he moved into the MX2 Elite class to debut Ducati's new 250cc motocross bike. Swedish rider Isak Gifting was able to take the title with a round to spare.

Valerio Lata was the reigning champion in the MX2 Elite class, after winning his first title in the previous season. Lata put in another dominant performance, to successfully defend his title.

All sessions of the third round in Montevarchi were held on the Sunday in respect of the mourning for the passing of Pope Francis.

== Race calendar and results ==
The full calendar with both dates and venues was released on 22 January.

=== MX1 ===
Round	Date	Location	Race 1 Winner	Race 2 Winner	Round Winner
1	8–9 March	(Lombardy) Ottobiano	(Sweden) Isak Gifting	(Slovenia) Jan Pancar	(Slovenia) Jan Pancar
2	29–30 March	(Lombardy) Mantua	(Italy) Nicholas Lapucci	(Sweden) Isak Gifting	(Sweden) Isak Gifting
3	26–27 April	(Tuscany) Montevarchi	(Slovenia) Jan Pancar	(Slovenia) Jan Pancar	(Slovenia) Jan Pancar
4	17–18 May	(Marche) Cingoli	(Sweden) Isak Gifting	(Sweden) Isak Gifting	(Sweden) Isak Gifting
5	30–31 August	(Umbria) Castiglione del Lago	(Sweden) Isak Gifting	(Sweden) Isak Gifting	(Sweden) Isak Gifting
6	27–28 September	(Trentino-Alto Adige/Südtirol) Pietramurata	(Italy) Valerio Lata	(Slovenia) Jan Pancar	(Italy) Valerio Lata

=== MX2 ===
Round	Date	Location	Race 1 Winner	Race 2 Winner	Round Winner
1	8–9 March	(Lombardy) Ottobiano	(Italy) Valerio Lata	(Italy) Valerio Lata	(Italy) Valerio Lata
2	29–30 March	(Lombardy) Mantua	(Italy) Valerio Lata	(Italy) Valerio Lata	(Italy) Valerio Lata
3	26–27 April	(Tuscany) Montevarchi	(Italy) Ferruccio Zanchi	(Italy) Ferruccio Zanchi	(Italy) Ferruccio Zanchi
4	17–18 May	(Marche) Cingoli	(Italy) Valerio Lata	(Italy) Valerio Lata	(Italy) Valerio Lata
5	30–31 August	(Umbria) Castiglione del Lago	(Italy) Valerio Lata	(Italy) Valerio Lata	(Italy) Valerio Lata
6	27–28 September	(Trentino-Alto Adige/Südtirol) Pietramurata	(San Marino) Andrea Zanotti	(Italy) Alessandro Lupino	(Italy) Alessandro Lupino

=== Circuit locations ===
2025 Italian Prestige Motocross Championship locations

== MX1 ==
=== Participants ===
Elite Riders
Team	Constructor	No	Rider	Rounds
FM CAMI Racing Team	Honda	3	(Italy) Federico Tuani	All
FM CAMI Racing Team	Honda	37	(Italy) Yuri Quarti	All
MB Team	Honda	17	(France) Brice Maylin	All
Bloms MX Racing Team	Husqvarna	18	(Sweden) Jakob Zetterholm	1–2
Honda HRC	Honda	18	(Italy) Valerio Lata	6
DP19 Racing	Yamaha	19	(Italy) David Philippaerts	5
	Honda	49	(Italy) Mattia Dusi	4–6
	Yamaha	54	(Sweden) Hugo Johansson	1
Yamaha Motor Schweiz	Yamaha	58	(Switzerland) Flavio Wolf	1–2, 4, 6
	Yamaha	60	(Sweden) Anton Nagy	2
KTM Team Pro Racing Sport	KTM	84	(Italy) Giulio Nava	1–2
Scoccia Racing Team	Kawasaki	85	(France) Cédric Soubeyras	All
Scoccia Racing Team	Kawasaki	128	(Italy) Ivo Monticelli	All
A-Team Honda	Honda	110	(Italy) Matteo Puccinelli	All
JWR Honda Racing	Honda	171	(Norway) Cornelius Tøndel	3–4
Millionaire Racing Team	Honda	197	(Italy) Gabriele Arbini	1–2
Millionaire Racing Team	Honda	223	(Italy) Giuseppe Tropepe	1–2
Extreme Motorsport	Yamaha	199	(Czech Republic) Rudolf Plch	1–2, 4
Amsil Racing FZ Motorsport KTM	KTM	200	(Italy) Filippo Zonta	All
FRT Motorsport	Kawasaki	211	(Italy) Nicholas Lapucci	All
MRT Racing Team Beta	Beta	226	(Germany) Tom Koch	1
MRT Racing Team Beta	Beta	919	(United Kingdom) Ben Watson	1
Caparvi Racing Team	Yamaha	227	(Italy) Vincenzo Giarrizzo	All
Caparvi Racing Team	Yamaha	311	(Italy) Mirko Dal Bosco	1–3, 5–6
TEM JP253 KTM Racing Team	KTM	253	(Slovenia) Jan Pancar	All
	Honda	276	(France) Jeremy Bonneau	1
AK MDR Motocross Team	Gas Gas	499	(Italy) Emanuele Alberio	All
	Kawasaki	504	(Sweden) Lucas Holgersson	1
	KTM	531	(Austria) Florian Hellrigl	2
JK Racing Yamaha	Yamaha	577	(Sweden) Isak Gifting	All
	Fantic	644	(Italy) Ismaele Guarise	4–6
Tecno B Racing	KTM	771	(Italy) Simone Croci	All
	Husqvarna	779	(Switzerland) Cyril Zurbrügg	1–4
Modale Motorsport	Honda	878	(Italy) Stefano Pezzuto	3–6
Beta Factory Enduro Team	Beta	918	(United Kingdom) Nathan Watson	1
Fast Riders
Team	Constructor	No	Rider	Rounds
Team Castellari	Gas Gas	11	(Italy) Giacomo Bosi	5–6
Team Alba Racing Kawasaki	Kawasaki	15	(Italy) Nicola Recchia	2–3
	KTM	22	(Italy) Raffaele Giuzio	2
55 R.S. Racing Team	Yamaha	23	(Italy) Tommaso Sarasso	All
Tognetti Racing Department	KTM	24	(Italy) Leonardo Angeli	1–2
Beta Motorcycles	Beta	31	(Italy) Francesco Bassi	All
MCR Racing Team	Husqvarna	35	(Italy) Alessandro Lentini	2–6
Triumph Italia Racing	Triumph	40	(Italy) Morgan Lesiardo	2
PMS Racing	KTM	46	(Italy) Antonio Schiochet	1–4
Racing Team Padovano Moto	Yamaha	68	(Italy) Luca Cardaccia	All
Pardi Racing KTM	KTM	86	(Italy) Matteo Del Coco	2–4
	Kawasaki	89	(Italy) Thomas Berto	5
	Kawasaki	93	(Italy) Giacomo Redondi	2
Team 505 Racing	Gas Gas	109	(Italy) Riccardo Cencioni	3–5
T&P MX Training	KTM	113	(Italy) Filippo Beltramo	2
GPX Motocross Team	Husqvarna	117	(Italy) Nicola Cariolato	1–2, 4
GPX Motocross Team	Husqvarna	838	(Italy) Paolo Ermini	All
	Honda	151	(Italy) Giacomo Bosi	All
	KTM	153	(Italy) Riccardo Bindi	3–6
	Honda	173	(Italy) Georg Falser	2, 6
DS214 Motosport	Gas Gas	214	(Italy) Daniele Salone	1
	Honda	224	(Italy) Alessandro Brugnoni	3–5
	Husqvarna	231	(Italy) Jacopo Pasqualotto	1–4
	Honda	232	(Italy) Andrea Testella	4, 6
	Beta	263	(Italy) Alfredo Memoli	4
FM CAMI Racing Team	Honda	308	(Italy) Lorenzo Albieri	All
	Gas Gas	374	(Italy) Gabriele Oteri	4
Martin Racing Technology	Honda	397	(Italy) Yuri Pasqualini	All
MB Team	Honda	399	(Italy) Pietro Trinchieri	All
Tecno B Racing	Husqvarna	421	(Italy) Eugenio Barbaglia	1
	Yamaha	450	(Italy) Andrea Fossi	1–4
	KTM	484	(Italy) Marco Stella	3–4, 6
	KTM	510	(Italy) Nicola Matteucci	3
AB15 Motorsport	Yamaha	515	(Italy) Adriano Bazzucchi	4–5
Planet Racing	Honda	551	(Italy) Jacopo Traini	2
	Honda	566	(Italy) Gianluca Nebbia	1–2, 4–5
	Honda	599	(Italy) Manuel Ciarlo	1–5
	KTM	601	(Italy) Gregory Scandiani	5
	Yamaha	702	(Italy) Pablo d'Aniello	1–2, 4–6
	Kawasaki	711	(Switzerland) Lukas Elmer	1
LC Racing Team	Yamaha	714	(Italy) Nicholas Gipponi	1–3
	KTM	724	(Italy) Cristian Cantergiani	1–5
	KTM	773	(Italy) Alessio Croci	All
MRC Racing	Honda	821	(Italy) Nathan Mariani	All
	Suzuki	885	(Italy) Alex Masoner	2
A-Team Honda	Honda	937	(Italy) Francesco Ranieri	2–6
	Kawasaki	949	(Italy) Alessandro Contessi	4, 6
AB Racing Team	Gas Gas	974	(Italy) Mario Tamai	6

=== Riders Championship ===
Points are awarded to riders in both the A and B group races, in the following format:

Place	1	2	3	4	5	6	7	8	9	10	11	12	13	14	15	16	17	18	19	20	21	22	23	24	25	26	27	28	29	30	31	32	33	34	35	36	37	38	39	40
Group A	250	210	170	140	120	110	100	90	85	80	77	74	72	70	68	66	64	63	62	61	60	59	58	57	56	55	54	53	52	51	50	49	48	47	46	45	44	43	42	41
Group B	40	39	38	37	36	35	34	33	32	31	30	29	28	27	26	25	24	23	22	21	20	19	18	17	16	15	14	13	12	11	10	9	8	7	6	5	4	3	2	1

Pos	Rider	Bike	OTT (Lombardy)		MAN (Lombardy)		MON (Tuscany)		CIN (Marche)		CDL (Umbria)		PIE (Trentino-Alto Adige/Südtirol)		Points
Elite Riders
1	(Sweden) Isak Gifting	Yamaha	1	2	2	1	4	3	1	1	1	1	2	3	2610
2	(Slovenia) Jan Pancar	KTM	2	1	5	2	1	1	5	2	DSQ	DNS	4	1	2010
3	(Italy) Ivo Monticelli	Kawasaki	3	3	16	3	2	2	2	3	6	4	6	5	1856
4	(Italy) Nicholas Lapucci	Kawasaki	5	5	1	4	3	Ret	4	8	3	2	3	4	1720
5	(France) Cédric Soubeyras	Kawasaki	11	12	4	7	5	4	3	4	2	3	5	7	1561
6	(Italy) Filippo Zonta	KTM	8	13	10	5	7	5	6	7	12	13	7	6	1148
7	(Italy) Yuri Quarti	Honda	6	11	15	10	6	6	18	6	4	15	9	9	1106
8	(Italy) Simone Croci	KTM	10	9	12	15	13	11	8	5	5	33	8	11	1001
9	(Italy) Emanuele Alberio	Gas Gas	13	17	7	12	11	7	10	17	14	7	13	13	945
10	(Italy) Matteo Puccinelli	Honda	18	22	14	20	9	9	22	13	9	5	12	8	923
11	(Italy) Federico Tuani	Honda	15	15	11	8	8	37	7	9	8	6	Ret	10	902
12	(France) Brice Maylin	Honda	16	14	9	14	21	10	9	10	7	Ret	22	16	821
13	(Italy) Vincenzo Giarrizzo	Yamaha	14	38	18	35	10	8	Ret	DNS	13	8	14	33	672
14	(Italy) Mirko Dal Bosco	Yamaha	23	21	24	19	DNS	DNS			18	11	19	34	486
15	(Italy) Valerio Lata	Honda											1	2	460
16	(Italy) Stefano Pezzuto	Honda					12	12	Ret	12	16	10	11	Ret	445
17	(Italy) Giuseppe Tropepe	Honda	19	8	3	6									432
18	(Switzerland) Flavio Wolf	Yamaha	34	31	33	27			29	24			28	22	420
19	(Italy) Giulio Nava	KTM	9	7	8	11									352
20	(Switzerland) Cyril Zurbrügg	Husqvarna	4 (B)	4 (B)	4 (B)	6 (B)	26	25	36	31					352
21	(Italy) Ismaele Guarise	Fantic							12	Ret	24	17	10	12	349
22	(Czech Republic) Rudolf Plch	Yamaha	36	25	26	18			19	16					347
23	(Italy) Mattia Dusi	Honda							27	Ret	27	24	20	19	288
24	(United Kingdom) Ben Watson	Beta	4	4											280
25	(Germany) Tom Koch	Beta	7	6											210
26	(Italy) Gabriele Arbini	Yamaha	26	DNS	23	21									173
27	(United Kingdom) Nathan Watson	Beta	12	10											154
28	(Austria) Florian Hellrigl	KTM			19	16									128
29	(Norway) Cornelius Tøndel	Honda					DNS	DNS	35	14					116
30	(France) Jeremy Bonneau	Honda	31	36											95
31	(Sweden) Anton Nagy	Yamaha			39	29									94
32	(Sweden) Jakob Zetterholm	Husqvarna	37	37	DNS (B)	DNS (B)									88
33	(Italy) David Philippaerts	Yamaha									11	DNS			77
34	(Sweden) Hugo Johansson	Yamaha	40	DNS											41
35	(Sweden) Lucas Holgersson	Kawasaki	2 (B)	DNS (B)											39
Fast Riders
1	(Italy) Yuri Pasqualini	Honda	20	23	13	17	14	14	14	19	32	12	25	29	758
2	(Italy) Tommaso Sarasso	Yamaha	17	16	22	23	18	20	24	20	37	25	17	21	713
3	(Italy) Giacomo Bosi	Honda	22	20	1 (B)	1 (B)	30	13	13	36	17	16	15	14	708
4	(Italy) Luca Cardaccia	Yamaha	1 (B)	1 (B)	27	26	23	24	20	27	23	21	26	27	646
5	(Italy) Alessio Croci	KTM	35	32	32	33	27	21	31	35	29	32	29	24	612
6	(Italy) Francesco Bassi	Beta	28	30	34	37	17	18	15	Ret	10	9	Ret	26	610
7	(Italy) Nathan Mariani	Honda	33	29	3 (B)	2 (B)	36	23	23	30	19	22	34	35	603
8	(Italy) Pietro Trinchieri	Honda	32	28	28	30	24	27	30	25	20	23	23	Ret	601
9	(Italy) Manuel Ciarlo	Honda	30	26	25	22	16	15	34	34	21	19			571
10	(Italy) Alessandro Lentini	Husqvarna			31	24	31	22	17	23	30	27	21	18	566
11	(Italy) Paolo Ermini	Husqvarna	24	18	37	28	29	19	37	21	22	18	DNS	DNS	557
12	(Italy) Pablo d'Aniello	Yamaha	27	33	36	Ret			11	18	15	14	18	17	552
13	(Italy) Antonio Schiochet	KTM	21	19	20	32	15	17	16	15					498
14	(Italy) Lorenzo Albieri	Honda	DNS (B)	DNS (B)	30	25	25	33	33	28	25	Ret	24	23	483
15	(Italy) Gianluca Nebbia	Honda	29	24	35	34			21	26	31	28			420
16	(Italy) Riccardo Bindi	KTM					28	32	28	33	26	29	31	28	413
17	(Italy) Francesco Ranieri	Honda			7 (B)	4 (B)	33	28	DNS (B)	DNS (B)	35	31	33	30	367
18	(Italy) Cristian Cantergiani	KTM	6 (B)	6 (B)	9 (B)	7 (B)	1 (B)	1 (B)	4 (B)	1 (B)	33	Ret			341
19	(Italy) Alessandro Brugnoni	Honda					20	36	25	22	28	20			335
20	(Italy) Jacopo Pasqualotto	Husqvarna	5 (B)	3 (B)	5 (B)	10 (B)	32	29	6 (B)	6 (B)					312
21	(Italy) Matteo Del Coco	KTM			21	Ret	19	26	26	11					309
22	(Italy) Andrea Fossi	Yamaha	7 (B)	5 (B)	10 (B)	9 (B)	37	31	1 (B)	2 (B)					306
23	(Italy) Riccardo Cencioni	Gas Gas					34	35	8 (B)	8 (B)	36	30			255
24	(Italy) Nicholas Gipponi	Yamaha	3 (B)	2 (B)	2 (B)	3 (B)	35	30							251
25	(Italy) Alessandro Contessi	Kawasaki							32	29			16	15	235
26	(Italy) Nicola Recchia	Kawasaki			29	36	22	16							222
27	(Italy) Nicola Cariolato	Husqvarna	39	34	11 (B)	11 (B)			7 (B)	7 (B)					217
28	(Italy) Marco Stella	KTM					38	34	5 (B)	5 (B)			32	Ret	211
29	(Italy) Giacomo Bosi	Gas Gas									34	26	30	25	209
30	(Italy) Morgan Lesiardo	Triumph			6	9									195
31	(Italy) Leonardo Angeli	KTM	38	35	38	31									182
32	(Italy) Andrea Testella	Honda							3 (B)	3 (B)			36	31	171
33	(Italy) Adriano Bazzucchi	Yamaha							2 (B)	4 (B)	38	34			166
34	(Italy) Georg Falser	Honda			12 (B)	12 (B)							35	32	153
35	(Italy) Giacomo Redondi	Kawasaki			17	13									136
36	(Italy) Mario Tamai	Gas Gas											27	20	115
37	(Italy) Eugenio Barbaglia	Husqvarna	25	27											110
38	(Italy) Alfredo Memoli	Beta							38	32					92
39	(Italy) Gregory Scandiani	KTM									39	35			80
40	(Italy) Jacopo Traini	Honda			8 (B)	5 (B)									69
41	(Italy) Filippo Beltramo	KTM			6 (B)	8 (B)									68
42	(Switzerland) Lukas Elmer	Kawasaki	9 (B)	7 (B)											66
43	(Italy) Thomas Berto	Kawasaki									40	DNS			42
44	(Italy) Daniele Salone	Gas Gas	8 (B)	DNS (B)											33
	(Italy) Raffaele Giuzio	KTM			Ret	DNS									0
	(Italy) Alex Masoner	Suzuki			DNS (B)	DNS (B)									0
	(Italy) Nicola Matteucci	KTM					DNS (B)	DNS (B)							0
	(Italy) Gabriele Oteri	Gas Gas							DNS (B)	DNS (B)					0
Pos	Rider	Bike	OTT (Lombardy)		MAN (Lombardy)		MON (Tuscany)		CIN (Marche)		CDL (Umbria)		PIE (Trentino-Alto Adige/Südtirol)		Points

== MX2 ==
=== Participants ===
Elite Riders
Team	Constructor	No	Rider	Rounds
Honda HRC	Honda	1	(Italy) Valerio Lata	1–5
Honda HRC	Honda	73	(Italy) Ferruccio Zanchi	3
JK Racing Yamaha	Yamaha	2	(Latvia) Jēkabs Kubuliņš	6
Ghidinelli Racing	KTM	5	(Italy) Brando Rispoli	1–5
Ghidinelli Racing	KTM	217	(France) Alexis Fueri	1–4, 6
TM Moto CRD Motosport	TM	7	(Italy) Niccolò Mannini	1–2
TM Moto CRD Motosport	TM	20	(Czech Republic) Julius Mikula	All
Alix Racing Team - ABF Italia	Honda	7	(Italy) Niccolò Mannini	5–6
Alix Racing Team - ABF Italia	Honda	81	(Germany) Brian Hsu	All
	KTM	13	(Italy) Alessandro Facca	1
MX-Handel Husqvarna Racing	Husqvarna	14	(Estonia) Sebastian Leok	1
Racestore KTM Factory Rookies	KTM	29	(Italy) Nicolò Alvisi	1
F4E Gas Gas Racing Team	Gas Gas	61	(Spain) Elias Escandell	6
Peklaj Husqvarna Racing Team	Husqvarna	63	(Slovenia) Jaka Peklaj	1, 4–5
MaxBart Motorsport	Husqvarna	71	(Italy) Morgan Bennati	3–6
Aruba.it Ducati Factory MX Team	Ducati	77	(Italy) Alessandro Lupino	All
Fantic Factory Racing EMX250	Fantic	97	(Italy) Simone Mancini	1–2, 4
Motormix Racing Team	Gas Gas	111	(Italy) Alessandro Manucci	All
Extreme Motorsport	KTM	116	(Czech Republic) Vít Kachlík	1
Bardahl Junior Racing Team	KTM	146	(Italy) Davide Brandini	1, 3, 5–6
	Husqvarna	212	(Italy) Alfio Pulvirenti	4
	Kawasaki	212	(Italy) Alfio Pulvirenti	6
MotoXGeneration	Husqvarna	270	(Israel) Ofir Casey Tzemach	2–3
Honda Racing RedMoto	Honda	321	(Italy) Samuele Bernardini	1
Diana MX Team	Husqvarna	329	(Italy) Maurizio Scollo	1–4
Diana MX Team	Husqvarna	669	(Italy) Luca Ruffini	1–4, 6
	Husqvarna	334	(Sweden) Martin Larsson	1
FlyOver Competition	Kawasaki	420	(Italy) Andrea Rossi	1–5
M.V. 532 Racing	Gas Gas	532	(Italy) Mirko Valsecchi	1–3, 5–6
KTM Suomi	KTM	595	(Finland) Eliel Lehtinen	2
MCR Racing Team	Husqvarna	931	(San Marino) Andrea Zanotti	All
MotoXgeneration Husqvarna	Husqvarna	963	(Slovenia) Mark Müller	All
Fast Riders
Team	Constructor	No	Rider	Rounds
DigiMX Off Road Team	KTM	9	(Italy) Francesco Bartalucci	All
AK MDR Motocross Team	Gas Gas	10	(Italy) Giorgio Macrì	All
Team Castellari	Gas Gas	11	(Italy) Giacomo Bosi	1–4
Team Castellari	Gas Gas	62	(Italy) Davide Zampino	All
Team Castellari	Gas Gas	651	(Italy) Giovanni Meneghello	1, 5–6
	TM	12	(Italy) Luca Rosati	2–6
3MX Team	Gas Gas	16	(Italy) Lorenzo Quartini	1–2
3MX Team	Gas Gas	213	(Italy) Federico Salvi	1
	TM	21	(Italy) Marco Lolli	4
	KTM	22	(Italy) Gianluca Facchetti	6
MaxBart Motorsport	Husqvarna	25	(Italy) Alessandro Sadovschi	1, 4–5
MaxBart Motorsport	Husqvarna	336	(Italy) Lorenzo Aglietti	All
GI Cross Racing Team	Husqvarna	28	(Italy) Simone d'Agata	1–3
GI Cross Racing Team	Husqvarna	938	(Brazil) Rodolfo Bicalho	2–4
Meca Motor	KTM	938	(Brazil) Rodolfo Bicalho	6
	KTM	33	(Italy) Samuele Casadei	1–4
	KTM	34	(Italy) Iacopo Fabbri	All
	Honda	45	(Italy) Federico Marion	1–2, 4, 6
	Kawasaki	66	(Italy) Andrea Davoli	2
Team Borz MX School	Yamaha	67	(Italy) Luca Borz	2
Team Borz MX School	Yamaha	98	(Italy) Nicola Borz	2
	Honda	69	(Italy) Sebastiano Romano	1–2, 5–6
	Honda	70	(Italy) Daniel Bartolini	4, 6
Pedica Racing Team	Honda	74	(Italy) Alessandro Valeri	All
Pedica Racing Team	Honda	522	(Slovenia) Miha Vrh	1, 3, 5–6
	Kawasaki	89	(Italy) Thomas Berto	4
	KTM	92	(Italy) Andrea Cipriani	All
Martin Racing Technology	Honda	99	(Italy) Alessandro Gaspari	All
MTA MX Racing	KTM	102	(Italy) Filippo Mantovani	6
	Husqvarna	127	(Italy) Ciro Tramontano	3–4
	KTM	130	(Italy) Thomas Masciadri	All
	Honda	134	(Italy) Emanuel Paglialunga	1, 4
Best Matic Team	Kawasaki	140	(Italy) Tommaso Lodi	All
SRS Racing Team	Honda	142	(Italy) Denny Bastianon	1, 4–6
	KTM	153	(Italy) Riccardo Bindi	1–2
	Yamaha	181	(Italy) Riccardo Perrone	All
ICM Motorsport	KTM	191	(Italy) Davide Della Valle	1–4, 6
	Husqvarna	204	(Italy) Edoardo Volpicelli	All
Lancini Racing Team	Kawasaki	218	(Italy) Bryan Besacchi	2
	Husqvarna	225	(Italy) Alessandro Lucchini	1, 5–6
Team Seven Motorsport	Husqvarna	240	(Chile) César Paine	5–6
MCR Racing Team	Husqvarna	246	(Italy) Giorgio Verderosa	1
	KTM	251	(Italy) Simone Pavan	1–2, 4–6
McDonald's Racing Team	KTM	259	(Italy) Manuel Cavina	2
FlyOver Competition	Kawasaki	269	(Italy) Pietro Dal Fitto	All
JK Racing Yamaha	Yamaha	284	(Italy) Giorgio Orlando	1–3, 5–6
JK Racing Yamaha	Yamaha	371	(Italy) Manuel Iacopi	All
Gabrielli Moto	Husqvarna	292	(Italy) Alex Trento	3–4, 6
	Honda	296	(Italy) Davide Paglialunga	1, 4
A-Team Honda	Honda	313	(Italy) Tommaso Isdraele	All
MCV Motorsport ABF Italia	TM	322	(Italy) Filippo Gervasio	2, 4–6
MCV Motorsport ABF Italia	TM	611	(Italy) Riccardo Pini	1–2
MCV Motorsport ABF Italia	TM	911	(Italy) Gennaro Utech	1–3
	Honda	323	(Italy) Tommaso Cape	3–5
	KTM	343	(Italy) Nicolo Paolucci	2
	KTM	351	(Italy) Giacomo Ciani	3
A.B. Racing Team	Gas Gas	364	(Italy) Mattia Nardo	1–2, 4, 6
A.B. Racing Team	Gas Gas	928	(Italy) Vincenzo Bove	2–6
	Beta	392	(Italy) Davide Zanone	1, 3–4
	KTM	411	(Italy) Samuele Mecchi	3
	Yamaha	424	(Italy) Davide Giustacchini	1–2
	Fantic	425	(Italy) Francesco Poeta	3, 5
Veris Italia	Husqvarna	440	(Italy) Andrea Brilli	All
	KTM	452	(Italy) Alex Gruber	2
	Honda	467	(Italy) Alessio Righetti	2
	Husqvarna	482	(Italy) Alessio Martone	All
Cava Motor	KTM	491	(Italy) Davide Nardi	6
Team Factory Paolucci Racing	Gas Gas	500	(Italy) Francesco Zoriaco	All
Modale Motorsport	Honda	511	(Italy) Simone Manfredini	1
55 R.S. Racing Team	Yamaha	519	(Italy) Giacomo Marchisio	3–4
	Honda	523	(Italy) Manolo D'ettorre	4–5
MJC Team	Yamaha	528	(Italy) Michael Conte	2
	Husqvarna	538	(Italy) Roberto Ciannavei	5
TM Zagreb	Yamaha	549	(Croatia) Šimun Ivandić	1–2, 5
	Yamaha	558	(Italy) Pablo Zonta	2
	Gas Gas	567	(Italy) Brando Polato	2–6
	Gas Gas	601	(Italy) Gregory Scandiani	1
Jackie Race Mode	KTM	634	(Italy) Juri Bortolazzo	2
	Gas Gas	660	(Italy) Andrea Squizzato	1
	Husqvarna	666	(Italy) Riccardo Oldani	1–2, 4–6
Kros Team Honda	Honda	701	(Italy) Riccardo Marchini	1–5
	Gas Gas	710	(Italy) Jeremi Scandiani	1–5
JRT MX Team	Honda	752	(Italy) Matteo Borghi	6
JRT MX Team	Honda	880	(Italy) Matteo Luigi Russi	5–6
Team Alba Racing Kawasaki	Kawasaki	880	(Italy) Matteo Luigi Russi	1–2
Dirtbike MX Racing Team	KTM	753	(Italy) Patrick Busatto	1–4
	KTM	784	(Italy) Michael Tocchio	2
	Gas Gas	797	(Italy) Luca Ghirelli	1–4
	KTM	831	(Italy) Paolo Martorano	1–2, 4–5
	Gas Gas	870	(Italy) Sebastiano Casamenti	2, 5–6
Bartolini Racing Team	Honda	920	(Italy) Luca Moro	All
	Husqvarna	933	(Italy) Giacomo Pigozzo	2

=== Riders Championship ===
Points are awarded to riders in both the A and B group races, in the following format:

Place	1	2	3	4	5	6	7	8	9	10	11	12	13	14	15	16	17	18	19	20	21	22	23	24	25	26	27	28	29	30	31	32	33	34	35	36	37	38	39	40
Group A	250	210	170	140	120	110	100	90	85	80	77	74	72	70	68	66	64	63	62	61	60	59	58	57	56	55	54	53	52	51	50	49	48	47	46	45	44	43	42	41
Group B	40	39	38	37	36	35	34	33	32	31	30	29	28	27	26	25	24	23	22	21	20	19	18	17	16	15	14	13	12	11	10	9	8	7	6	5	4	3	2	1

Pos	Rider	Bike	OTT (Lombardy)		MAN (Lombardy)		MON (Tuscany)		CIN (Marche)		CDL (Umbria)		PIE (Trentino-Alto Adige/Südtirol)		Points
Elite Riders
1	(Italy) Valerio Lata	Honda	1	1	1	1	2	2	1	1	1	1			2420
2	(Italy) Alessandro Lupino	Ducati	10	2	3	2	Ret	3	3	2	2	2	2	1	2100
3	(Czech Republic) Julius Mikula	TM	2	3	4	23	9	4	4	3	3	3	5	6	1683
4	(San Marino) Andrea Zanotti	Husqvarna	5	7	2	3	10	11	5	7	15	11	1	2	1582
5	(Germany) Brian Hsu	Honda	4	15	12	5	3	5	6	14	4	7	3	3	1452
6	(Italy) Alessandro Manucci	Gas Gas	15	12	10	4	12	13	Ret	5	5	4	7	12	1062
7	(France) Alexis Fueri	KTM	9	36	6	6	7	6	7	6			22	10	909
8	(Italy) Luca Ruffini	Husqvarna	21	10	5	17	5	7	8	19			8	19	848
9	(Italy) Andrea Rossi	Kawasaki	11	9	11	7	6	9	Ret	15	22	13			733
10	(Italy) Simone Mancini	Fantic	25	4	7	11			2	4					723
11	(Italy) Morgan Bennati	Husqvarna					15	19	9	10	8	5	11	9	667
12	(Italy) Mirko Valsecchi	Gas Gas	3	11	13	24	DNS	DNS			14	9	9	Ret	616
13	(Italy) Brando Rispoli	KTM	29	8	25	8	16	12	15	13	Ret	DNS			568
14	(Italy) Maurizio Scollo	Husqvarna	16	13	16	35	18	15	13	12					527
15	(Italy) Ferruccio Zanchi	Honda					1	1							500
16	(Italy) Niccolò Mannini	TM	Ret	23	18	Ret									485
16	(Italy) Niccolò Mannini	Honda									6	6	12	14	485
17	(Italy) Davide Brandini	KTM	37	Ret			27	27			9	22	33	31	394
18	(Slovenia) Mark Müller	Husqvarna	15 (B)	20 (B)	23 (B)	20 (B)	9 (B)	14 (B)	9 (B)	9 (B)	10 (B)	9 (B)	10 (B)	10 (B)	334
19	(Israel) Ofir Casey Tzemach	Husqvarna			27	25	17	17							238
20	(Latvia) Jēkabs Kubuliņš	Yamaha											4	8	230
21	(Italy) Samuele Bernardini	Honda	6	5											230
22	(Slovenia) Jaka Peklaj	Husqvarna	22	Ret					32	30	5 (B)	11 (B)			225
23	(Italy) Alfio Pulvirenti	Husqvarna							18	11					201
23	(Italy) Alfio Pulvirenti	Kawasaki											20	Ret	201
24	(Estonia) Sebastian Leok	Husqvarna	8	6											200
25	(Italy) Alessandro Facca	KTM	13	19											134
26	(Italy) Nicolò Alvisi	KTM	19	18											125
27	(Finland) Eliel Lehtinen	KTM			30	26									106
28	(Sweden) Martin Larsson	Husqvarna	5 (B)	2 (B)											75
29	(Spain) Elias Escandell	Gas Gas											Ret	16	66
30	(Czech Republic) Vít Kachlík	KTM	28 (B)	30 (B)											24
Fast Riders
1	(Italy) Manuel Iacopi	Yamaha	23	21	14	10	4	10	23	21	7	8	14	7	966
2	(Italy) Alessandro Valeri	Honda	18	20	17	20	20	20	14	9	16	19	27	18	771
3	(Italy) Alessandro Gaspari	Honda	12	25	9	18	14	16	Ret	20	12	14	13	15	759
4	(Italy) Tommaso Isdraele	Honda	7	Ret	20	15	8	8	11	18	11	10	Ret	DNS	706
5	(Italy) Iacopo Fabbri	KTM	26	33	DNS (B)	DNS (B)	13	21	12	8	21	15	17	20	652
6	(Italy) Andrea Brilli	Husqvarna	27	26	22	22	34	34	25	26	27	29	32	25	643
7	(Italy) Luca Rosati	TM			26	19	22	22	17	16	13	20	15	13	638
8	(Italy) Francesco Zoriaco	Gas Gas	33	34	34	28	29	31	26	25	1 (B)	1 (B)	21	23	606
9	(Italy) Lorenzo Aglietti	Husqvarna	3 (B)	7 (B)	19	14	37	18	19	38	Ret	17	16	28	599
10	(Italy) Luca Moro	Honda	4 (B)	9 (B)	21	16	23	24	2 (B)	2 (B)	23	27	18	Ret	563
11	(Italy) Pietro Dal Fitto	Kawasaki	28	28	24	29	21	Ret	20	23	25	21	34	Ret	557
12	(Italy) Vincenzo Bove	Gas Gas			33	32	33	25	21	31	18	18	28	21	550
13	(Italy) Giorgio Orlando	Yamaha	17	16	15	9	38	DNS			28	25	36	27	534
14	(Italy) Davide Zampino	Gas Gas	13 (B)	8 (B)	5 (B)	7 (B)	3 (B)	12 (B)	27	27	24	24	29	26	527
15	(Italy) Andrea Cipriani	KTM	12 (B)	10 (B)	2 (B)	27 (B)	26	29	22	37	19	23	1 (B)	1 (B)	523
16	(Italy) Riccardo Perrone	Yamaha	30 (B)	4 (B)	11 (B)	6 (B)	31	28	30	22	32	35	25	Ret	477
17	(Italy) Francesco Bartalucci	KTM	7 (B)	15 (B)	31 (B)	10 (B)	10 (B)	7 (B)	29	36	30	28	31	30	468
18	(Italy) Patrick Busatto	KTM	36	31	8	12	11	Ret	10	32					465
19	(Italy) Edoardo Volpicelli	Husqvarna	14	35	23	30	25	Ret	24	24	DNS (B)	DNS (B)	30	DNS	446
20	(Italy) Davide Della Valle	KTM	35	30	38	DNS	35	32	33	28			DNS (B)	2 (B)	375
21	(Italy) Simone Pavan	KTM	39	32	29	27			4 (B)	19 (B)	DNS (B)	DNS (B)	24	24	370
22	(Italy) Paolo Martorano	KTM	31	22	28	Ret			1 (B)	1 (B)	17	26			361
23	(Italy) Riccardo Marchini	Honda	9 (B)	22 (B)	35	34	8 (B)	4 (B)	35	34	2 (B)	Ret (B)			346
24	(Italy) Riccardo Oldani	Husqvarna	Ret (B)	5 (B)	22 (B)	14 (B)			7 (B)	5 (B)	26	33	15 (B)	7 (B)	315
25	(Italy) Giovanni Meneghello	Gas Gas	38	24							37	34	23	22	308
26	(Italy) Thomas Masciadri	KTM	6 (B)	32 (B)	7 (B)	4 (B)	13 (B)	5 (B)	16 (B)	6 (B)	DNS (B)	DNS (B)	7 (B)	6 (B)	308
27	(Italy) Filippo Gervasio	TM			3 (B)	3 (B)			10 (B)	3 (B)	31	32	Ret	29	296
28	(Chile) César Paine	Husqvarna									10	12	19	11	293
29	(Italy) Mattia Nardo	Gas Gas	24	Ret	Ret	21			16	17			35	DNS	293
30	(Italy) Matteo Luigi Russi	Kawasaki	30	14	32	13									291
30	(Italy) Matteo Luigi Russi	Honda									Ret	DNS	Ret	32	291
31	(Italy) Davide Zanone	Beta	34	29			36	35	34	29					289
32	(Italy) Alessio Martone	Husqvarna	23 (B)	25 (B)	26 (B)	15 (B)	16 (B)	16 (B)	18 (B)	21 (B)	11 (B)	7 (B)	13 (B)	17 (B)	284
33	(Italy) Denny Bastianon	Honda	DNS (B)	DNS (B)					3 (B)	4 (B)	20	16	3 (B)	3 (B)	278
34	(Italy) Jeremi Scandiani	Gas Gas	31 (B)	17 (B)	16 (B)	Ret (B)	1 (B)	2 (B)	8 (B)	15 (B)	4 (B)	4 (B)			271
35	(Italy) Tommaso Lodi	Kawasaki	26 (B)	12 (B)	25 (B)	Ret (B)	15 (B)	17 (B)	20 (B)	16 (B)	DNS (B)	6 (B)	5 (B)	5 (B)	263
36	(Slovenia) Miha Vrh	Honda	8 (B)	11 (B)			11 (B)	8 (B)			7 (B)	3 (B)	4 (B)	16 (B)	260
37	(Italy) Gennaro Utech	TM	20	17	DNS (B)	DNS (B)	19	14							257
38	(Croatia) Šimun Ivandić	Yamaha	32	27	29 (B)	2 (B)					33	31			252
39	(Italy) Filippo Mantovani	KTM											6	4	250
40	(Italy) Giorgio Macrì	Gas Gas	Ret (B)	DNS (B)	31	33	DNS (B)	DNS (B)	28	33	34	Ret	DNS (B)	DNS (B)	246
41	(Brazil) Rodolfo Bicalho	Husqvarna			36	31	32	26	36	DNS					244
41	(Brazil) Rodolfo Bicalho	KTM											DNS (B)	DNS (B)	244
42	(Italy) Alex Trento	Husqvarna					24	23	Ret	Ret			26	17	234
43	(Italy) Luca Ghirelli	Gas Gas	17 (B)	14 (B)	19 (B)	13 (B)	2 (B)	18 (B)	6 (B)	7 (B)					232
44	(Italy) Giacomo Bosi	Gas Gas	14 (B)	26 (B)	10 (B)	11 (B)	6 (B)	1 (B)	24 (B)	22 (B)					214
45	(Italy) Sebastiano Romano	Honda	29 (B)	23 (B)	14 (B)	21 (B)					3 (B)	5 (B)	8 (B)	14 (B)	211
46	(Italy) Federico Marion	Honda	21 (B)	13 (B)	21 (B)	18 (B)			15 (B)	14 (B)			11 (B)	8 (B)	207
47	(Italy) Gianluca Facchetti	KTM											10	5	200
48	(Italy) Alessandro Sadovschi	Husqvarna	19 (B)	27 (B)					12 (B)	11 (B)	29	30			198
49	(Italy) Simone d'Agata	Husqvarna	2 (B)	3 (B)	13 (B)	17 (B)	4 (B)	9 (B)							198
50	(Italy) Sebastiano Casamenti	Gas Gas			9 (B)	8 (B)					6 (B)	2 (B)	12 (B)	15 (B)	194
51	(Italy) Samuele Casadei	KTM	16 (B)	24 (B)	15 (B)	12 (B)	Ret	11 (B)	17 (B)	10 (B)					182
52	(Italy) Alessandro Lucchini	Husqvarna	10 (B)	29 (B)							8 (B)	8 (B)	14 (B)	12 (B)	165
53	(Italy) Daniel Bartolini	Honda							31	35			9 (B)	9 (B)	160
54	(Italy) Riccardo Pini	TM	1 (B)	1 (B)	1 (B)	1 (B)									160
55	(Italy) Tommaso Cape	Honda					12 (B)	13 (B)	13 (B)	13 (B)	35	Ret			159
56	(Italy) Francesco Poeta	Fantic					7 (B)	6 (B)			36	36			159
57	(Italy) Brando Polato	Gas Gas			DNS (B)	DNS (B)	5 (B)	3 (B)	23 (B)	Ret (B)	DNS (B)	DNS (B)	Ret (B)	11 (B)	122
58	(Italy) Riccardo Bindi	KTM	11 (B)	6 (B)	37	Ret									109
59	(Italy) Samuele Mecchi	KTM					28	30							104
60	(Italy) Ciro Tramontano	Husqvarna					30	33	DNS (B)	DNS (B)					99
61	(Italy) Emanuel Paglialunga	Honda	22 (B)	21 (B)					14 (B)	8 (B)					99
62	(Italy) Giacomo Marchisio	Yamaha					17 (B)	10 (B)	21 (B)	18 (B)					98
63	(Italy) Matteo Borghi	Honda											2 (B)	4 (B)	76
64	(Italy) Davide Paglialunga	Honda	25 (B)	31 (B)					19 (B)	17 (B)					72
65	(Italy) Pablo Zonta	Yamaha			8 (B)	5 (B)									69
66	(Italy) Manolo D'ettorre	Honda							22 (B)	20 (B)	12 (B)	Ret (B)			69
67	(Italy) Davide Giustacchini	Yamaha	20 (B)	16 (B)	20 (B)	DNS (B)									67
68	(Italy) Lorenzo Quartini	Gas Gas	24 (B)	28 (B)	17 (B)	28 (B)									67
69	(Italy) Marco Lolli	TM							5 (B)	12 (B)					65
70	(Italy) Davide Nardi	KTM											6 (B)	13 (B)	63
71	(Italy) Roberto Ciannavei	Husqvarna									9 (B)	10 (B)			63
72	(Italy) Alessio Righetti	Honda			4 (B)	19 (B)									59
73	(Italy) Giacomo Ciani	KTM					14 (B)	15 (B)							53
74	(Italy) Bryan Besacchi	Kawasaki			24 (B)	9 (B)									49
75	(Italy) Michael Tocchio	KTM			12 (B)	22 (B)									48
76	(Italy) Andrea Davoli	Kawasaki			18 (B)	16 (B)									48
77	(Italy) Giorgio Verderosa	Husqvarna	18 (B)	19 (B)											45
78	(Italy) Gregory Scandiani	Gas Gas	27 (B)	18 (B)											37
79	(Italy) Michael Conte	Yamaha			6 (B)	DSQ (B)									35
80	(Italy) Thomas Berto	Kawasaki							11 (B)	Ret (B)					30
81	(Italy) Giacomo Pigozzo	Husqvarna			28 (B)	24 (B)									30
82	(Italy) Juri Bortolazzo	KTM			27 (B)	25 (B)									30
83	(Italy) Manuel Cavina	KTM			32 (B)	23 (B)									27
84	(Italy) Nicolo Paolucci	KTM			30 (B)	26 (B)									26
85	(Italy) Andrea Squizzato	Gas Gas	32 (B)	DNS (B)											9
86	(Italy) Federico Salvi	Gas Gas	Ret (B)	33 (B)											8
87	(Italy) Alex Gruber	KTM			33 (B)	Ret (B)									8
	(Italy) Luca Borz	Yamaha			DNS	DNS									0
	(Italy) Simone Manfredini	Honda	DNS (B)	DNS (B)											0
	(Italy) Nicola Borz	Yamaha			DNS (B)	DNS (B)									0
Pos	Rider	Bike	OTT (Lombardy)		MAN (Lombardy)		MON (Tuscany)		CIN (Marche)		CDL (Umbria)		PIE (Trentino-Alto Adige/Südtirol)		Points
