= 2026 Italian Prestige Motocross Championship =

Italian National Motocross Competition in 2026

The 2026 Italian Prestige Motocross Championship season was the 18th edition of the Italian Motocross Championship carrying the 'Prestige' moniker.

The series consisted of six rounds, running from March to late August. Isak Gifting was the reigning champion in the MX1 Elite class, after winning his first prestige title in 2025. Due to a pre-season injury, Gifing was not able to successfully defend his title. Slovenian Jan Pancar won three of the six rounds contested to take his first MX1 Elite title, to add to his MX2 Elite title that he won in 2022.

Valerio Lata was the reigning champion in the MX2 Elite class, after winning his second consecutive title with a round to spare in the previous season. Lata was once again the dominant force in the class, winning four of the six rounds overall to take his third consecutive MX2 Elite title.

The second race at the opening round was cancelled for both classes due to poor weather conditions and the condition of the track.

The second race in the MX1 class at the final round was stopped and then cancelled during the first lap, due to a crash involving several riders and low sun causing visibility issues.

== Race calendar and results ==
The full calendar with both dates and venues was released on 9 February.

=== MX1 ===
Round	Date	Location	Race 1 Winner	Race 2 Winner	Round Winner
1	14–15 March	(Lombardy) Ottobiano	(Italy) Alessandro Lupino	Race Cancelled	(Italy) Alessandro Lupino
2	2–3 May	(Piedmont) Maggiora	(Italy) Andrea Adamo	(Slovenia) Jan Pancar	(Slovenia) Jan Pancar
3	16–17 May	(Marche) Fermo	(Slovenia) Tim Gajser	(Slovenia) Tim Gajser	(Slovenia) Tim Gajser
4	13–14 June	(Trentino-Alto Adige/Südtirol) Pietramurata	(Italy) Ivo Monticelli	(Slovenia) Jan Pancar	(Italy) Ivo Monticelli
5	10–11 July	(Emilia-Romagna) Faenza	(Slovenia) Jan Pancar	(Slovenia) Jan Pancar	(Slovenia) Jan Pancar
6	29–30 August	(Umbria) Castiglione del Lago	(Slovenia) Jan Pancar	Race Cancelled	(Slovenia) Jan Pancar

=== MX2 ===
Round	Date	Location	Race 1 Winner	Race 2 Winner	Round Winner
1	14–15 March	(Lombardy) Ottobiano	(Italy) Valerio Lata	Race Cancelled	(Italy) Valerio Lata
2	2–3 May	(Piedmont) Maggiora	(Italy) Valerio Lata	(Italy) Ferruccio Zanchi	(Italy) Valerio Lata
3	16–17 May	(Marche) Fermo	(Italy) Valerio Lata	(Italy) Valerio Lata	(Italy) Valerio Lata
4	13–14 June	(Trentino-Alto Adige/Südtirol) Pietramurata	(Italy) Valerio Lata	(France) Maxime Grau	(France) Maxime Grau
5	10–11 July	(Emilia-Romagna) Faenza	(France) Maxime Grau	(Italy) Valerio Lata	(France) Maxime Grau
6	29–30 August	(Umbria) Castiglione del Lago	(Italy) Valerio Lata	(Italy) Valerio Lata	(Italy) Valerio Lata

=== Circuit locations ===
2026 Italian Prestige Motocross Championship locations

== MX1 ==
=== Participants ===
Elite Riders
Team	Constructor	No	Rider	Rounds
JK Racing Yamaha	Yamaha	1	(Sweden) Isak Gifting	5–6
JK Racing Yamaha	Yamaha	42	(France) Benoît Paturel	3
FM CAMI Racing Team	Honda	3	(Italy) Federico Tuani	All
FM CAMI Racing Team	Honda	81	(Germany) Brian Hsu	All
MRT Racing Team Beta	Beta	4	(Netherlands) Rick Elzinga	1
DP19 Racing	Yamaha	19	(Italy) David Philippaerts	5
MCR Racing Team	Husqvarna	37	(Italy) Yuri Quarti	All
Triumph Italia Racing	Triumph	41	(Italy) Morgan Lesiardo	1
Yamaha Motor Schweiz	Yamaha	53	(Switzerland) Flavio Wolf	1–2, 4
Pedica Racing Team	Honda	74	(Italy) Alessandro Valeri	All
Red Bull Ducati Factory Team	Ducati	77	(Italy) Alessandro Lupino	All
Red Bull KTM Factory Racing	KTM	80	(Italy) Andrea Adamo	2
MB Team	Honda	85	(France) Cédric Soubeyras	All
Van Venrooy KTM Racing	KTM	101	(Italy) Mattia Guadagnini	1
A-Team Honda	Honda	110	(Italy) Matteo Puccinelli	1–4, 6
Motormix Racing Team	Gas Gas	111	(Italy) Alessandro Manucci	1, 6
GCC Swiss Racing Team	Husqvarna	119	(Switzerland) Nicolas Bender	2–4
Scoccia Racing Team	Kawasaki	128	(Italy) Ivo Monticelli	All
Team Honda Gariboldi Racing	Honda	163	(Japan) Yuki Okura	2
FZ Motorsport	KTM	200	(Italy) Filippo Zonta	All
Millionaire Racing Team	Honda	211	(Italy) Nicholas Lapucci	1, 3–6
Monster Energy Yamaha Factory MXGP Team	Yamaha	243	(Slovenia) Tim Gajser	3
TEM JP253 KTM Racing Team	KTM	253	(Slovenia) Jan Pancar	All
Honda Racing RedMoto Enduro	Honda	321	(Italy) Samuele Bernardini	6
Fantic Switzerland	Fantic	331	(Switzerland) Loris Freidig	4
377 Racing Team	Ducati	377	(Czech Republic) Martin Krč	3
Yamaha Center Västerås	Yamaha	403	(Sweden) Neo Svensson	1
AK MDR Motocross Team	Husqvarna	499	(Italy) Emanuele Alberio	1–5
Caparvi Racing Team	Yamaha	771	(Italy) Simone Croci	1–5
Fast Riders
Team	Constructor	No	Rider	Rounds
	Gas Gas	11	(Italy) Giacomo Bosi	2, 4–6
55 R.S. Racing Team	Yamaha	23	(Italy) Tommaso Sarasso	All
MCR Racing Team	Husqvarna	35	(Italy) Alessandro Lentini	1–3, 5–6
	Beta	43	(Italy) Alex Trento	2–6
Triumph Padova	Triumph	46	(Italy) Antonio Schiochet	All
3MX Team Motorsport	Gas Gas	61	(Italy) Matteo Pessina	4
Racing Team Padovano Moto	Yamaha	68	(Italy) Luca Cardaccia	All
Modale Motorsport	Honda	82	(Italy) Dennis Gentile	2
Modale Motorsport	Honda	226	(Italy) Alessandro Taricco	2–3
Modale Motorsport	Honda	375	(Italy) Edoardo Cagno	4–5
GI Cross Racing Team	Husqvarna	86	(Italy) Matteo Del Coco	1–5
	Honda	98	(Italy) Michele Pierantozzi	3
	Gas Gas	113	(Italy) Manuel Monni	5–6
Caparvi Racing Team	Ducati	122	(Italy) Mirko Dal Bosco	All
Caparvi Racing Team	Yamaha	221	(Italy) Vincenzo Giarrizzo	6
Best Matic Team	Kawasaki	140	(Italy) Tommaso Lodi	2–5
DKB Racing Team	Honda	142	(Italy) Denny Bastianon	6
	Honda	151	(Italy) Giacomo Bosi	1
	Honda	153	(Italy) Riccardo Bindi	3–5
Millionaire Racing Team	Honda	197	(Italy) Gabriele Arbini	All
SRS Racing Team	Honda	202	(Italy) Leobruno di Biase	3, 6
SRS Racing Team	Honda	224	(Italy) Alessandro Brugnoni	3, 6
	KTM	203	(Italy) Cosimo Bellocci	1–2
21.5 Motosport	Yamaha	215	(Italy) Mattia Lolli	5
	Triumph	263	(Italy) Alfredo Memoli	1–5
3zero8 Motorsport	Husqvarna	308	(Italy) Lorenzo Albieri	All
	KTM	382	(Italy) Gabriele Bonifazio	2, 4–6
Gabrielli Moto	Husqvarna	397	(Italy) Yuri Pasqualini	2–4
Cabutti Team	Ducati	399	(Italy) Pietro Trinchieri	All
Tecno B Racing	KTM	421	(Italy) Eugenio Barbaglia	2
	Husqvarna	440	(Italy) Andrea Brilli	All
F.E. Racing Team	Yamaha	450	(Italy) Andrea Fossi	All
	KTM	491	(Italy) Davide Nardi	1–4
Bluemaza Motocross Team	Honda	566	(Italy) Gianluca Nebbia	1–5
	Aprilia	599	(Italy) Manuel Ciarlo	1
Triumph Verona	Triumph	644	(Italy) Ismaele Guarise	All
Triumph Savona	Triumph	702	(Italy) Pablo D'Aniello	1–4
	Gas Gas	711	(Italy) Pietro Landolfi	4–5
	KTM	724	(Italy) Cristian Cantergiani	All
	KTM	773	(Italy) Alessio Croci	2–6
MB Team	Honda	791	(Italy) Marco Valsangiacomo	2
Bartolini Racing Team	Honda	821	(Italy) Nathan Mariani	1, 5–6
Turci Racing Team	KTM	831	(Italy) Paolo Martorano	5–6
	Honda	898	(Italy) Stefano Sonego	5
A-Team Honda	Honda	937	(Italy) Francesco Ranieri	All
	Kawasaki	949	(Switzerland) Alessandro Contessi	2–4
AB Racing Team	Gas Gas	974	(Italy) Mario Tamai	All

=== Riders Championship ===
Points are awarded to riders in both the A and B group races, in the following format:

Place	1	2	3	4	5	6	7	8	9	10	11	12	13	14	15	16	17	18	19	20	21	22	23	24	25	26	27	28	29	30	31	32	33	34	35	36	37	38	39	40
Group A	250	220	200	180	160	150	140	130	120	110	100	90	80	70	68	66	64	63	62	61	60	59	58	57	56	55	54	53	52	51	50	49	48	47	46	45	44	43	42	41
Group B	40	39	38	37	36	35	34	33	32	31	30	29	28	27	26	25	24	23	22	21	20	19	18	17	16	15	14	13	12	11	10	9	8	7	6	5	4	3	2	1

Pos	Rider	Bike	OTT (Lombardy)		MAG (Piedmont)		FER (Marche)		PIE (Trentino-Alto Adige/Südtirol)		FAE (Emilia-Romagna)		CDL (Umbria)		Points
Elite Riders
1	(Slovenia) Jan Pancar	KTM	36	C	2	1	2	2	7	1	1	1	1	C	2095
2	(Italy) Alessandro Lupino	Ducati	1	C	3	Ret	3	5	2	4	4	4	3	C	1770
3	(Italy) Ivo Monticelli	Kawasaki	4	C	7	3	9	4	1	2	5	5	6	C	1760
4	(France) Cédric Soubeyras	Honda	9	C	8	6	6	6	4	6	7	9	5	C	1450
5	(Italy) Yuri Quarti	Husqvarna	10	C	5	5	4	7	6	5	11	7	7	C	1440
6	(Italy) Nicholas Lapucci	Honda	3	C			8	38	5	3	2	3	4	C	1333
7	(Germany) Brian Hsu	Honda	31	C	4	4	5	3	Ret	28	6	6	10	C	1233
8	(Italy) Federico Tuani	Honda	5	C	6	7	7	8	8	8	12	18	15	C	1201
9	(Italy) Filippo Zonta	KTM	30	C	Ret	10	10	11	3	7	8	8	8	C	1101
10	(Italy) Alessandro Valeri	Honda	12	C	9	8	35	9	10	9	13	11	9	C	1036
11	(Sweden) Isak Gifting	Yamaha									3	2	2	C	640
12	(Italy) Simone Croci	Yamaha	Ret	C	10	12	39	13	14	16	18	16			587
13	(Italy) Matteo Puccinelli	Honda	11	C	14	11	20	10	Ret	DNS			14	C	511
14	(Italy) Emanuele Alberio	Husqvarna	14	C	11	18	17	39	11	15	DNS	DNS			507
15	(Slovenia) Tim Gajser	Yamaha					1	1							500
16	(Italy) Andrea Adamo	KTM			1	2									470
17	(Switzerland) Nicolas Bender	Husqvarna			20	17	21	19	13	19					389
18	(Switzerland) Flavio Wolf	Yamaha	26	C	35	32			31	26					255
19	(Italy) Morgan Lesiardo	Triumph	2	C											220
20	(Italy) Alessandro Manucci	Gas Gas	8	C									16	C	196
21	(Italy) David Philippaerts	Yamaha									9	17			184
22	(Czech Republic) Martin Krč	Ducati					12	24							147
23	(Japan) Yuki Okura	Honda			16	13									146
24	(France) Benoît Paturel	Yamaha					40	12							131
25	(Switzerland) Loris Freidig	Fantic							23	35					104
26	(Italy) Samuele Bernardini	Honda											12	C	90
27	(Netherlands) Rick Elzinga	Beta	13	C											80
28	(Italy) Mattia Guadagnini	KTM	32	C											49
29	(Sweden) Neo Svensson	Yamaha	4 (B)	C											37
Fast Riders
1	(Italy) Ismaele Guarise	Triumph	17	C	13	15	11	14	9	10	10	10	11	C	932
2	(Italy) Pietro Trinchieri	Ducati	15	C	18	21	18	18	20	12	16	12	21	C	684
3	(Italy) Mario Tamai	Gas Gas	18	C	15	16	15	17	16	17	15	13	18	C	670
4	(Italy) Mirko Dal Bosco	Ducati	16	C	22	14	14	16	18	13	20	19	17	C	661
5	(Italy) Antonio Schiochet	Triumph	6	C	27	29	26	25	19	25	22	22	26	C	658
6	(Italy) Gabriele Arbini	Honda	7	C	19	19	1 (B)	1 (B)	22	29	21	26	19	C	632
7	(Italy) Tommaso Sarasso	Yamaha	33	C	38	23	16	22	15	18	19	15	20	C	596
8	(Italy) Andrea Brilli	Husqvarna	22	C	32	31	34	36	29	31	26	25	30	C	514
9	(Italy) Lorenzo Albieri	Husqvarna	21	C	Ret	30	23	27	32	32	17	14	25	C	511
10	(Italy) Gianluca Nebbia	Honda	20	C	24	26	31	28	26	21	24	27			502
11	(Italy) Luca Cardaccia	Yamaha	27	C	28	Ret	37	34	25	24	23	20	23	C	488
12	(Italy) Alfredo Memoli	Triumph	19	C	25	24	28	40	30	20	31	30			482
13	(Italy) Andrea Fossi	Yamaha	25	C	1 (B)	1 (B)	2 (B)	2 (B)	33	30	30	21	35	C	470
14	(Italy) Alex Trento	Beta			29	34	29	23	24	23	37	32	28	C	470
15	(Italy) Matteo Del Coco	Husqvarna	29	C	17	22	32	29	12	11	DNS (B)	DNS (B)			466
16	(Italy) Alessio Croci	KTM			30	33	33	31	27	27	28	33	29	C	458
17	(Italy) Alessandro Lentini	Husqvarna	34	C	21	25	24	20			29	23	33	C	439
18	(Italy) Cristian Cantergiani	KTM	3 (B)	C	7 (B)	6 (B)	30	37	35	34	32	35	32	C	439
19	(Italy) Yuri Pasqualini	Husqvarna			12	9	13	15	21	Ret					418
20	(Switzerland) Alessandro Contessi	Kawasaki			26	20	19	21	17	14					372
21	(Italy) Francesco Ranieri	Honda	2 (B)	C	5 (B)	5 (B)	3 (B)	4 (B)	2 (B)	3 (B)	35	Ret	34	C	356
22	(Italy) Pablo D'Aniello	Triumph	23	C	23	27	27	30	Ret	DNS					275
23	(Italy) Gabriele Bonifazio	KTM			4 (B)	7 (B)			5 (B)	5 (B)	2 (B)	1 (B)	38	C	265
24	(Italy) Tommaso Lodi	Kawasaki			2 (B)	4 (B)	4 (B)	3 (B)	34	33	DNS (B)	DNS (B)			246
25	(Italy) Riccardo Bindi	Honda					38	33	37	DNS	34	24			239
26	(Italy) Giacomo Bosi	Gas Gas			33	Ret			1 (B)	1 (B)	25	Ret	36	C	229
27	(Italy) Davide Nardi	KTM	Ret	C	34	35	36	35	36	Ret					229
28	(Italy) Alessandro Brugnoni	Honda					22	26					24	C	171
29	(Italy) Paolo Martorano	KTM									27	29	22	C	165
30	(Italy) Edoardo Cagno	Honda							28	22	Ret	28			165
31	(Italy) Nathan Mariani	Honda	24	C							Ret	34	27	C	158
32	(Italy) Pietro Landolfi	Gas Gas							4 (B)	2 (B)	1 (B)	2 (B)			155
33	(Italy) Manuel Monni	Gas Gas									14	Ret	13	C	150
34	(Italy) Leobruno di Biase	Honda					25	32					37	C	149
35	(Italy) Alessandro Taricco	Honda			37	36	5 (B)	DNS (B)							125
36	(Italy) Cosimo Bellocci	KTM	35	C	6 (B)	2 (B)									120
37	(Italy) Eugenio Barbaglia	KTM			31	28									103
38	(Italy) Stefano Sonego	Honda									33	31			98
39	(Italy) Mattia Lolli	Yamaha									36	36			90
40	(Italy) Marco Valsangiacomo	Honda			36	37									89
41	(Italy) Dennis Gentile	Honda			3 (B)	3 (B)									76
42	(Italy) Matteo Pessina	Gas Gas							3 (B)	4 (B)					75
43	(Italy) Giacomo Bosi	Honda	28	C											53
44	(Italy) Denny Bastianon	Honda											31	C	50
45	(Italy) Manuel Ciarlo	Aprilia	1 (B)	C											40
	(Italy) Vincenzo Giarrizzo	Yamaha											Ret	C	0
	(Italy) Michele Pierantozzi	Honda					Ret (B)	DNS (B)							0
Pos	Rider	Bike	OTT (Lombardy)		MAG (Piedmont)		FER (Marche)		PIE (Trentino-Alto Adige/Südtirol)		FAE (Emilia-Romagna)		CDL (Umbria)		Points

== MX2 ==
=== Participants ===
Elite Riders
Team	Constructor	No	Rider	Rounds
Honda HRC Petronas	Honda	1	(Italy) Valerio Lata	All
Maddii Racing Honda – ABF Italia	Honda	2	(Italy) Nicolò Alvisi	All
Maddii Racing Honda – ABF Italia	Honda	6	(Spain) Elias Escandell	2, 4–5
Team Beta MRT Racing	Beta	5	(Italy) Brando Rispoli	1–5
Team Beta MRT Racing	Beta	717	(France) Alexis Fueri	1
FlyOver Competition	Triumph	7	(Italy) Niccolò Mannini	3–6
Team Seven Motorsport	TM	16	(Belgium) Douwe Van Mechgelen	1, 3
DP19 Racing	Yamaha	19	(Italy) David Philippaerts	1–2, 4
JK Racing Yamaha	Yamaha	24	(Latvia) Jēkabs Kubuliņš	1–2
JK Racing Yamaha	Yamaha	371	(Italy) Manuel Iacopi	1–5
Peklaj Husqvarna Racing Team	Husqvarna	63	(Slovenia) Jaka Peklaj	3
FlyOver Competition	Triumph	71	(Italy) Morgan Bennati	All
Beddini Racing Ducati Corse Factory MX2 Team	Ducati	73	(Italy) Ferruccio Zanchi	2–3
Beddini Racing Ducati Corse Factory MX2 Team	Ducati	97	(Italy) Simone Mancini	2–6
Maddii Racing Honda – ABF Italia	Honda	83	(France) Maxime Grau	All
GRT Motorsport AG99 Racing Team	KTM	99	(Italy) Alessandro Gaspari	2–6
MTA MX Racing	KTM	102	(Italy) Filippo Mantovani	4
JPV Racing	KTM	194	(Finland) Vilho Vehviläinen	1
Hostettler Moto Sion	Yamaha	205	(Switzerland) Anthony Franc	2, 4
Auctor MX Team	Honda	223	(Czech Republic) Přemysl Zimek	2–3, 5–6
	Kawasaki	261	(Switzerland) Marc Rütsche	2–3
	Beta	313	(Italy) Tommaso Isdraele	1–4
MX Academy Honda Schweiz	Honda	316	(Italy) Alberto Brida	2
Ghidinelli Racing Team	KTM	329	(Italy) Maurizio Scollo	All
Team Reds 420 Performance	KTM	420	(Italy) Andrea Rossi	1–3
Team Honda Gariboldi Racing	Honda	461	(Japan) Lukumo Yoshida	2
M.V. 532 Racing	TM	532	(Italy) Mirko Valsecchi	1–3, 5–6
Diana Mx Team	Husqvarna	669	(Italy) Luca Ruffini	5–6
	Yamaha	737	(Spain) Matvei Lankin	1–2, 4
MCR Racing Team	Husqvarna	931	(San Marino) Andrea Zanotti	All
MotoXgeneration Husqvarna	Husqvarna	963	(Slovenia) Mark Müller	1, 4–5
Fast Riders
Team	Constructor	No	Rider	Rounds
DigiMX Off Road Team	KTM	9	(Italy) Francesco Bartalucci	All
	Honda	10	(Italy) Giorgio Macri	All
TM Moto/MCV Motorsport	TM	12	(Italy) Luca Rosati	All
TM Moto/MCV Motorsport	TM	611	(Italy) Riccardo Pini	All
TM Moto/MCV Motorsport	TM	777	(Italy) Cristian Amali	1, 3
	KTM	13	(Italy) Alessandro Facca	1
SRS Racing Team	Honda	20	(Italy) Domenico Iezzi	6
Team Fix Racing	TM	21	(Italy) Marco Lolli	6
MaxBart Motorsport	Husqvarna	25	(Italy) Alessandro Sadovschi	1–4
MaxBart Motorsport	Husqvarna	240	(Chile) César Paine Díaz	1–4
MaxBart Motorsport	Husqvarna	306	(Italy) Lapo Aglietti	2
MaxBart Motorsport	Husqvarna	336	(Italy) Lorenzo Aglietti	All
Pardi Racing KTM	KTM	26	(Italy) Leonardo Valenti	5
Pardi Racing KTM	KTM	47	(Italy) Angelo Fabbri	3
MB Team	Honda	27	(Italy) Simone Manfredini	5–6
Beta Motorcycles	Beta	31	(Italy) Francesco Bassi	1–3, 5
	KTM	32	(Italy) Alessandro Traversini	2–4
Pedica Racing Team	Honda	34	(Italy) Iacopo Fabbri	2–6
Pedica Racing Team	Honda	522	(Slovenia) Miha Vrh	1–2
	Honda	48	(Italy) Lorenzo Bonino	1, 4–6
Corsini Corse Racing Team	Honda	55	(Italy) Daniel Bartolini	All
Corsini Corse Racing Team	Honda	335	(Italy) Luca Gerlini	5
Racestore KTM	KTM	58	(Italy) Andrea Roberti	All
Mandrile Racing Team	Yamaha	65	(Italy) Francesco Assini	2
Endurance MX	Gas Gas	79	(Italy) Luca Ghirelli	All
Team MJC Yamaha	Yamaha	87	(Italy) Michael Conte	2, 4–6
RSR KTM	KTM	88	(Italy) Ramon Savioli	6
	Yamaha	90	(Italy) Gabriele Rossi	2
	Honda	91	(Italy) Nicolo Paolucci	2–6
	Honda	92	(Italy) Andrea Cipriani	2, 6
Cazzaniga Racing Team	KTM	107	(Italy) Giorgio Bruno	5
	TM	115	(Italy) Giovanni Ciampi	All
Triumph Salerno	Triumph	120	(Italy) Ciro Tramontano	1–5
Loreno Race	KTM	130	(Italy) Thomas Masciadri	1–3
	Honda	134	(Italy) Emanuel Paglialunga	3
Best Matic Team	Kawasaki	140	(Italy) Tommaso Lodi	6
	Honda	145	(Italy) Michele Piccoli	3–4, 6
Bardahl Junior Racing Team	Gas Gas	146	(Italy) Davide Brandini	2
	Honda	172	(Italy) Luigi Gerlini	5–6
	Honda	179	(Italy) Gabriele Vannelli	3, 6
Careglio Moto	Beta	181	(Italy) Riccardo Perrone	2
ICM Motorsport	KTM	191	(Italy) Davide Della Valle	All
GI Cross Racing Team	Husqvarna	212	(Italy) Alfio Pulvirenti	1–2
3MX Team	Gas Gas	216	(Italy) Lorenzo Quartini	2–3
	KTM	217	(Italy) Matteo Sanna	6
Caparvi Racing Team	Yamaha	221	(Italy) Vincenzo Giarrizzo	1–2
	Husqvarna	225	(Italy) Alessandro Lucchini	2–6
DP19 Racing	TM	246	(Italy) Giorgio Verderosa	1–2, 4
	KTM	251	(Italy) Simone Pavan	2–4
FZ Motorsport	KTM	269	(Italy) Pietro Dal Fitto	All
Otto Racing Technology	Husqvarna	278	(Italy) Alessandro Di Pietro	1, 3
MGR Kawasaki	Kawasaki	284	(Italy) Giorgio Orlando	1–2, 4–6
	KTM	288	(Italy) Marco Campoduni	3
Academy Racestore Team	KTM	291	(Italy) Riccardo Burrini	3
	KTM	294	(Italy) Marcello Inverardi	2–3
	Honda	323	(Italy) Tommaso Cape	2, 5–6
TM Moto CRD Motosport Factory Racing	TM	353	(Italy) Andrea Uccellini	2–3
	Beta	364	(Italy) Mattia Nardo	1–4
	Kawasaki	384	(Italy) Lorenzo Camporese	2
	Beta	392	(Italy) Davide Zanone	5–6
	Fantic	425	(Italy) Francesco Poeta	1
	KTM	482	(Italy) Alessio Martone	3–4
Team Factory Paolucci Racing	Gas Gas	500	(Italy) Francesco Zoriaco	4, 6
	KTM	511	(Italy) Samuele Mecchi	3
	Gas Gas	567	(Italy) Brando Polato	2–6
	Gas Gas	601	(Italy) Gregory Scandiani	5
Team Castellari	KTM	651	(Italy) Giovanni Meneghello	2–4, 6
	Husqvarna	666	(Italy) Riccardo Oldani	1–4, 6
	KTM	701	(Italy) Riccardo Marchini	All
	KTM	710	(Italy) Jeremi Scandiani	All
Pensini Moto	Beta	725	(Italy) Matteo Borghi	2
	Honda	784	(Italy) Michael Tocchio	1–3
	Honda	794	(Italy) Luca Assali	3
	Husqvarna	811	(Italy) Leonardo Calandra	2
	KTM	818	(Italy) Mattia Piredda	5
Turci Racing Team	KTM	831	(Italy) Paolo Martorano	1–3
Millionaire Racing Team	Honda	878	(Italy) Stefano Pezzuto	All
MCM Motocross Team	Kawasaki	884	(Italy) Valerio Mannaioli	6
Fantic Factory Racing EMX125	Fantic	911	(Italy) Gennaro Utech	1–2
Bartolini Racing Team	Honda	920	(Italy) Luca Moro	1–5
	Gas Gas	928	(Italy) Vincenzo Bove	All
Meca Motor	KTM	938	(Brazil) Rodolfo Bicalho	2, 4
3MX Team Motorsport	Husqvarna	978	(Italy) Gabriele Biffi	4

=== Riders Championship ===
Points are awarded to riders in both the A and B group races, in the following format:

Place	1	2	3	4	5	6	7	8	9	10	11	12	13	14	15	16	17	18	19	20	21	22	23	24	25	26	27	28	29	30	31	32	33	34	35	36	37	38	39	40
Group A	250	220	200	180	160	150	140	130	120	110	100	90	80	70	68	66	64	63	62	61	60	59	58	57	56	55	54	53	52	51	50	49	48	47	46	45	44	43	42	41
Group B	40	39	38	37	36	35	34	33	32	31	30	29	28	27	26	25	24	23	22	21	20	19	18	17	16	15	14	13	12	11	10	9	8	7	6	5	4	3	2	1

Pos	Rider	Bike	OTT (Lombardy)		MAG (Piedmont)		FER (Marche)		PIE (Trentino-Alto Adige/Südtirol)		FAE (Emilia-Romagna)		CDL (Umbria)		Points
Elite Riders
1	(Italy) Valerio Lata	Honda	1	C	1	2	1	1	1	3	Ret	1	1	1	2420
2	(France) Maxime Grau	Honda	4	C	6	3	3	3	2	1	1	2	2	2	2310
3	(Italy) Nicolò Alvisi	Honda	11	C	4	4	6	5	7	2	3	7	4	4	1830
4	(Italy) Simone Mancini	Ducati			2	5	2	10	6	9	2	3	10	3	1710
5	(Italy) Alessandro Gaspari	KTM			5	6	4	12	5	6	8	5	7	7	1460
6	(Italy) Morgan Bennati	Triumph	9	C	30	9	9	14	15	10	6	4	6	8	1269
7	(San Marino) Andrea Zanotti	Husqvarna	6	C	10	7	13	4	8	4	5	8	Ret	DNS	1260
8	(Italy) Niccolò Mannini	Triumph					5	6	Ret	7	7	6	3	Ret	940
9	(Italy) Brando Rispoli	Beta	Ret	C	9	10	8	11	10	5	16	11			896
10	(Italy) Maurizio Scollo	KTM	5	C	14	34	15	17	11	12	10	32	35	19	866
11	(Italy) Ferruccio Zanchi	Ducati			3	1	18	2							733
12	(Italy) Manuel Iacopi	Yamaha	2	C	7	12	16	7	DNS	DNS	DNS	DNS			656
13	(Italy) Mirko Valsecchi	TM	20	C	DNS	16	10	20			Ret	16	21	10	534
14	(Italy) Andrea Rossi	KTM	12	C	11	11	11	8							520
15	(Latvia) Jēkabs Kubuliņš	Yamaha	3	C	17	17									328
16	(Italy) David Philippaerts	Yamaha	14	C	15	22			16	21					323
17	(Spain) Elias Escandell	Honda			DNS	DNS			12	11	19	14			322
18	(Italy) Luca Ruffini	Husqvarna									9	19	15	38	293
19	(Italy) Tommaso Isdraele	Beta	15	C	DNS	DNS	14	38	Ret	13					261
20	(Belgium) Douwe Van Mechgelen	TM	10	C			22	13							249
21	(Czech Republic) Přemysl Zimek	Honda			DNS (B)	17 (B)	20 (B)	12 (B)			1 (B)	2 (B)	5 (B)	2 (B)	228
22	(Italy) Filippo Mantovani	KTM							9	23					178
23	(France) Alexis Fueri	Beta	7	C											140
24	(Slovenia) Mark Müller	Husqvarna	Ret (B)	C					10 (B)	10 (B)	3 (B)	4 (B)			137
25	(Spain) Matvei Lankin	Yamaha	4 (B)	C	27 (B)	27 (B)			12 (B)	12 (B)					123
26	(Slovenia) Jaka Peklaj	Husqvarna					36	28							98
27	(Switzerland) Anthony Franc	Yamaha			24 (B)	19 (B)			DNS (B)	13 (B)					67
28	(Switzerland) Marc Rütsche	Kawasaki			19 (B)	24 (B)	Ret (B)	20 (B)							60
29	(Japan) Lukumo Yoshida	Honda			DNS	23									58
30	(Finland) Vilho Vehviläinen	KTM	26	C											55
	(Italy) Alberto Brida	Honda			Ret (B)	DNS (B)									0
Fast Riders
1	(Italy) Riccardo Pini	TM	8	C	8	13	12	24	3	16	4	10	22	6	1252
2	(Italy) Andrea Roberti	KTM	34	C	16	18	19	15	4	8	Ret	13	5	5	1016
3	(Italy) Stefano Pezzuto	Honda	13	C	12	8	21	16	13	14	11	12	11	9	986
4	(Italy) Luca Rosati	TM	22	C	Ret	14	17	18	14	20	14	9	8	13	787
5	(Italy) Pietro Dal Fitto	KTM	36	C	7 (B)	10 (B)	20	22	22	15	12	20	26	14	633
6	(Italy) Vincenzo Bove	Gas Gas	DNS (B)	C	13	26	39	23	20	17	15	15	23	18	617
7	(Italy) Iacopo Fabbri	Honda			19	27	27	21	Ret	36	18	18	9	12	611
8	(Italy) Lorenzo Aglietti	Husqvarna	19	C	23	29	24	37	17	32	17	Ret	12	34	587
9	(Italy) Francesco Bartalucci	KTM	28	C	24	30	34	33	32	33	30	26	24	21	576
10	(Italy) Jeremi Scandiani	KTM	8 (B)	C	29	Ret	11 (B)	8 (B)	25	29	24	21	18	20	497
11	(Italy) Alessandro Lucchini	Husqvarna			27	32	35	32	26	30	20	28	2 (B)	3 (B)	495
12	(Italy) Riccardo Marchini	KTM	31	C	5 (B)	13 (B)	4 (B)	15 (B)	28	28	35	31	36	30	475
13	(Italy) Giovanni Meneghello	KTM			28	28	29	26	21	24			16	16	462
14	(Italy) Luca Ghirelli	Gas Gas	6 (B)	C	9 (B)	9 (B)	6 (B)	4 (B)	3 (B)	3 (B)	25	27	33	33	453
15	(Italy) Giorgio Macri	Honda	DNS (B)	C	22 (B)	29 (B)	7 (B)	11 (B)	30	26	29	17	29	25	425
16	(Italy) Michael Conte	Yamaha			1 (B)	2 (B)			24	35	23	22	20	22	419
17	(Italy) Giovanni Ciampi	TM	5 (B)	C	10 (B)	14 (B)	10 (B)	19 (B)	7 (B)	7 (B)	27	23	1 (B)	4 (B)	404
18	(Italy) Luca Moro	Honda	24	C	14 (B)	4 (B)	32	31	4 (B)	2 (B)	22	34			402
19	(Chile) César Paine Díaz	Husqvarna	35	C	12	33	23	19	19	19					398
20	(Italy) Andrea Uccellini	TM			20	15	7	9							389
21	(Italy) Davide Della Valle	KTM	7 (B)	C	13 (B)	7 (B)	38	Ret	31	27	28	24	DNS (B)	DNS (B)	353
22	(Italy) Brando Polato	Gas Gas			15 (B)	20 (B)	5 (B)	18 (B)	5 (B)	8 (B)	32	33	4 (B)	1 (B)	349
23	(Italy) Daniel Bartolini	Honda	DNS (B)	C	12 (B)	DNS (B)	12 (B)	17 (B)	9 (B)	11 (B)	31	25	34	32	346
24	(Italy) Giorgio Orlando	Kawasaki	Ret	C	Ret	35			23	18	Ret	DNS	17	11	331
25	(Italy) Lorenzo Bonino	Honda	30	C					6 (B)	9 (B)	33	30	28	24	327
26	(Italy) Mattia Nardo	Beta	17	C	33	24	25	27	Ret	37					323
27	(Italy) Riccardo Oldani	Husqvarna	27	C	26 (B)	12 (B)	19 (B)	2 (B)	8 (B)	1 (B)			38	35	321
28	(Italy) Ciro Tramontano	Triumph	1 (B)	C	Ret	31	33	25	DNS	22	26	Ret			308
29	(Italy) Francesco Bassi	Beta	16	C	26	36	Ret	Ret			13	36			291
30	(Italy) Nicolo Paolucci	Honda			23 (B)	28 (B)	15 (B)	22 (B)	14 (B)	14 (B)	9 (B)	8 (B)	9 (B)	9 (B)	259
31	(Italy) Tommaso Cape	Honda			28 (B)	6 (B)					34	29	39	37	233
32	(Italy) Alessandro Traversini	KTM			25	Ret	26	29	18	Ret					226
33	(Italy) Paolo Martorano	KTM	18	C	6 (B)	11 (B)	30	35							225
34	(Italy) Andrea Cipriani	Honda			3 (B)	1 (B)							13	27	212
35	(Italy) Davide Zanone	Beta									2 (B)	1 (B)	30	26	185
36	(Italy) Michele Piccoli	Honda					DNS (B)	DNS (B)	2 (B)	6 (B)			25	28	183
37	(Italy) Michael Tocchio	Honda	25	C	20 (B)	26 (B)	37	36							181
38	(Italy) Simone Pavan	KTM			4 (B)	3 (B)	DNS (B)	DNS (B)	29	31					177
39	(Brazil) Rodolfo Bicalho	KTM			22	20			Ret	25					176
40	(Italy) Gennaro Utech	Fantic	23	C	31	25									164
41	(Italy) Alessandro Sadovschi	Husqvarna	Ret (B)	C	Ret (B)	DNS (B)	31	34	13 (B)	4 (B)					162
42	(Italy) Cristian Amali	TM	29	C			28	30							156
43	(Italy) Francesco Zoriaco	Gas Gas							33	DNS			37	23	150
44	(Italy) Giorgio Verderosa	TM	2 (B)	C	8 (B)	Ret (B)			1 (B)	5 (B)					148
45	(Italy) Simone Manfredini	Honda									5 (B)	7 (B)	7 (B)	6 (B)	139
46	(Italy) Gabriele Vannelli	Honda					21 (B)	23 (B)					27	36	137
47	(Italy) Ramon Savioli	KTM											14	17	134
48	(Italy) Marco Lolli	TM											19	15	130
49	(Italy) Thomas Masciadri	KTM	9 (B)	C	18 (B)	16 (B)	18 (B)	16 (B)							128
50	(Italy) Lorenzo Camporese	Kawasaki			18	21									123
51	(Slovenia) Miha Vrh	Honda	32	C	2 (B)	8 (B)									121
52	(Italy) Davide Brandini	Gas Gas			32	19									111
53	(Italy) Alessandro Di Pietro	Husqvarna	3 (B)	C			2 (B)	7 (B)							111
54	(Italy) Luca Gerlini	Honda									21	35			106
55	(Italy) Marcello Inverardi	KTM			11 (B)	22 (B)	13 (B)	14 (B)							104
56	(Italy) Gabriele Biffi	Husqvarna							27	34					101
57	(Italy) Luigi Gerlini	Honda									DNS (B)	DNS (B)	32	29	101
58	(Italy) Valerio Mannaioli	Kawasaki											31	31	100
59	(Italy) Alessio Martone	KTM					8 (B)	6 (B)	11 (B)	Ret (B)					98
60	(Italy) Lorenzo Quartini	Gas Gas			29 (B)	18 (B)	14 (B)	13 (B)							90
61	(Italy) Samuele Mecchi	KTM					1 (B)	1 (B)							80
62	(Italy) Emanuel Paglialunga	Honda					3 (B)	3 (B)							76
63	(Italy) Domenico Iezzi	Honda											3 (B)	5 (B)	74
64	(Italy) Gregory Scandiani	Gas Gas									6 (B)	3 (B)			73
65	(Italy) Giorgio Bruno	KTM									4 (B)	6 (B)			72
66	(Italy) Leonardo Valenti	KTM									7 (B)	5 (B)			70
67	(Italy) Angelo Fabbri	KTM					9 (B)	5 (B)							68
68	(Italy) Matteo Sanna	KTM											6 (B)	8 (B)	68
69	(Italy) Tommaso Lodi	Kawasaki											8 (B)	7 (B)	67
70	(Italy) Vincenzo Giarrizzo	Yamaha	21	C	DNS (B)	DNS (B)									60
71	(Italy) Matteo Borghi	Beta			17 (B)	5 (B)									60
72	(Italy) Riccardo Burrini	KTM					16 (B)	10 (B)							56
73	(Italy) Marco Campoduni	KTM					22 (B)	9 (B)							51
74	(Italy) Francesco Assini	Yamaha			16 (B)	15 (B)									51
75	(Italy) Francesco Poeta	Fantic	33	C											48
76	(Italy) Alessandro Facca	KTM	37	C											44
77	(Italy) Luca Assali	Honda					17 (B)	21 (B)							44
78	(Italy) Gabriele Rossi	Yamaha			21 (B)	21 (B)									40
79	(Italy) Mattia Piredda	KTM									8 (B)	DNS (B)			33
80	(Italy) Lapo Aglietti	Husqvarna			25 (B)	25 (B)									32
81	(Italy) Leonardo Calandra	Husqvarna			Ret (B)	23 (B)									18
	(Italy) Alfio Pulvirenti	Husqvarna	Ret	C	DNS (B)	DNS (B)									0
	(Italy) Riccardo Perrone	Beta			DNS (B)	DNS (B)									0
Pos	Rider	Bike	OTT (Lombardy)		MAG (Piedmont)		FER (Marche)		PIE (Trentino-Alto Adige/Südtirol)		FAE (Emilia-Romagna)		CDL (Umbria)		Points
