= Valerio Lata =

Italian motocross racer

- Nationality: Italian
- Born: 6 July 2005 (age 21); Rome, Italy
- Bike number: 18

Valerio Lata (born 6 July 2005) is an Italian professional Motocross racer. Lata has raced full-time in the MX2 class of the Motocross World Championship since the 2025 season, following several wildcard appearances over the preceding three seasons.

From 2025-2026 Lata competed for Honda's factory HRC team.

Prior to his world championship tenure, Lata had a successful junior career, becoming the 85cc FIM World Champion in 2019 and winning the EMX125 class of the 2021 European Motocross Championship.

Domestically, Lata is a three-time champion of the Italian Prestige Motocross Championship in the Elite MX2 class.

Lata was part of the winning Italian teams at the 2018 and 2019 at the Motocross of European Nations events.

== Career ==
=== Junior career ===
Lata became Italian Junior champion in the 65 Cadetti class in 2016, moving from third to first in the standings at the final round after taking double race win. In the same season, he made his debut in the European Motocross Championship, finishing twelfth in the EMX65 class. Moving up to compete on an 85cc machine for 2017, Lata finished runner-up in the 85 Junior class of the Italian Junior Championship.

In his second season on an 85, Lata was crowned Italian Junior champion in the 85 Senior class. He qualified in third in the EMX85 class of the 2018 European Motocross Championship, before finishing tenth overall in the event. At the end of the season, Lata represented Italy at the Motocross of European Nations event, where he formed part of the team that took the overall win. 2019 would be Lata's final season on an 85 and his most successful in the junior classes. Winning every race in the Italian Junior Championship, he defended his national title and won the 85 class of the FIM Motocross Junior World Championship. His world championship in the 85 class came on home soil in Italy and was achieved in comprehensive style by winning both races. Adding to his palmares for the season, Lata finished runner-up in the EMX85 class of the 2019 European Motocross Championship and was a part of the Italian team that successfully defended their title at the Motocross of European Nations.

EMX125

Lata moved up to compete aboard a 125cc motorcycle during the COVID-19 pandemic-impacted 2020 season. Staying with the Marchetti KTM team, Lata embarked on a campaign in the EMX125 class of the 2020 European Motocross Championship. After not scoring at the opening round, Lata progressed rapidly following the pandemic-enforced break in the season, taking the overall win at the fifth round and finishing the season in ninth overall. In the 2021 European Motocross Championship, Lata took two overall wins and three individual race wins, proving to be the most consistent frontrunner throughout the season to take the EMX125 championship title. The junior world championship, held in Greece that year, saw Lata finish as runner-up in the 125 class behind early season EMX125 pacesetter Håkon Østerhagen. He was able to win the 125 class of the Italian Junior Championship in dominant style, winning all but two races throughout. Lata also made his debut in the MX2 class of the 2021 FIM Motocross World Championship, riding as a wildcard at the back-to-back rounds in Turkey and scoring six points.

=== 250 Career ===
EMX250

Following his MX2 debut at the end of 2021, Lata moved up to race a 250 full-time in 2022. He was only able to compete in four rounds of the 2022 European Motocross Championship in the EMX250 class and made five more MX2 appearances in the 2022 FIM Motocross World Championship, scoring 26 points. Making his debut in the Elite MX2 class of the Italian Prestige Motocross Championship, Lata finished fourth in the final standings, winning the opening race at the final round. He moved to the Beddini KTM squad ahead of the start of the 2023 season, for a full assault on the EMX250 class. Lata took his first race win and overall win at the second round in front of his home crowd but did not finish on the overall podium again, to end the series fifth in the standings. He made one MX2 appearance, at the MXGP of Italy, where he finished tenth overall. Lata finished third in Elite MX2 class of the Italian Prestige championship, taking four race wins and two overall wins.

With the Beddini team becoming the Gas Gas Factory Junior team for the 2024 European Motocross Championship, Lata had his best season in EMX250. After winning the two opening rounds, he led the championship for the first time, until a tough fourth round in France saw him lose it to eventual champion Mathis Valin. Lata battled with Valin throughout the rest of the championship, taking four overall wins and seven individual race wins in total, to finish the season as runner-up. He made two wildcard appearances in the MX2 class of the 2024 FIM Motocross World Championship, putting in a landmark performance in wet conditions in front of his home crowd in the second of these, to finish third overall and bag his first world championship podium. In addition, Lata dominated the 2024 Italian Prestige Motocross Championship, taking the overall win at every round in the Elite MX2 class and winning all but two races.

MX2

Lata made his full-time move to the MX2 class for the 2025 FIM Motocross World Championship season, signing for Honda's factory HRC team. In the two round pre-season Italian International Championship, Lata finished third in the final standings after podiuming at the opening round. He had a consistent start to the World Championship season, before scoring a third-place finish in the first race at the ninth round in France. A week later, Lata won qualifying race in Germany, to record his first pole position in the World Championship. After finishing fourth overall in that event, Lata was involved in a big crash with Kay de Wolf at the British round, with his results dropping off following this. At the final round in Australia, Lata finished second in the last race of the year (held in torrential rain) and landed on the bottom step of the podium. He defended his Elite MX2 class title successfully in the 2025 Italian Prestige Motocross Championship, winning all but one of the first five rounds, to wrap the title up with a round to spare. Taking advantage of this, he moved up to the Elite MX1 class at the final round, racing a 450 for the first time and taking the overall win.

Lata had a strong start to the 2026 FIM Motocross World Championship, recording two top six overall finishes in the first three rounds. As the season progressed though, his results dipped, more often than not fighting on the edge of the top-ten. After the Dutch grand prix, Lata and Honda parted ways with immediate effect, meaning he did not compete in the final three rounds of the year. As well as finishing eighth in the final standings, Lata would again successfully defend his national title in the 2026 Italian Prestige Motocross Championship, winning four of the six rounds held.

== Honours ==
FIM Motocross Junior World Championship

- 125cc: 2021 (silver)
- 85cc: 2019 (gold)

Motocross of European Nations

- Team Overall: 2018 & 2019 (Italy) (gold)

European Motocross Championship

- EMX250: 2024 (silver)
- EMX125: 2021 (gold)
- EMX85: 2019 (silver)

Italian Prestige Motocross Championship

- MX2 Elite: 2024, 2025 & 2026 (gold) , 2023 (bronze)

Italian International Motocross Championship

- MX2: 2025 (bronze)

Italian Junior Motocross Championship

- 125 Junior: 2021 (gold)
- 85 Senior: 2018 & 2019 (gold)
- 85 Junior: 2017 (silver)
- 65 Cadetti: 2016 (gold)

== Career statistics ==
=== FIM Motocross World Championship ===
==== By season ====
Season	Class	Number	Motorcycle	Team	Race	Race Wins	Overall Wins	Race Top-3	Overall Podium	Pts	Plcd
2021	MX2	23	KTM	Marchetti Racing Team KTM	4	0	0	0	0	6	45th
2022	MX2	53	KTM	MRT Racing Team KTM	10	0	0	0	0	26	33rd
2023	MX2	533	KTM	KTM Beddini	2	0	0	0	0	20	39th
2024	MX2	53	Gas Gas	Beddini Gas Gas Factory Juniors	4	0	0	1	1	55	26th
2025	MX2	18	Honda	Honda HRC	40	0	0	2	1	481	9th
2026	MX2	18	Honda	Honda HRC Petronas	32	0	0	0	0	414	8th
Total					92	0	0	3	2	1002	
