= Ferruccio Zanchi =

Italian motocross racer (born 2006)

- Nationality: Italian
- Born: 6 September 2006 (age 20); Florence, Italy
- Current team: Beddini Racing Ducati Corse Factory MX2 Team
- Bike number: 73

Ferruccio Zanchi (born 6 September 2006) is an Italian professional Motocross racer. Zanchi has competed in the FIM Motocross World Championship since making three wildcard appearances in the 2023 season.

From 2024 to 2025, Zanchi was part of Honda's factory Team HRC squad. In his second season with the team, he won his first race in the MX2 class, securing his first podium at the same event.

From the 2026 season, Zanchi joined Ducati's first factory team in the MX2 class of the Motocross World Championship, debuting the manufacturer's first 250cc motocross bike.

Zanchi represented his country at the 2026 Motocross des Nations.

Prior to racing at World Championship-level full-time, Zanchi scored six race wins in the European Motocross Championship, spread across the EMX125 and EMX250 classes.

== Career ==
=== Junior career ===
Zanchi won the 65 class of the Italian Junior Motocross Championship in 2017, winning all but one race on the way to the title. In the same year, he made his debut in the FIM Motocross Junior World Championship and competed in the EMX65 category of the 2017 European Motocross Championship, where he finished eighth overall. Moving up to race an 85cc motorcycle in 2018, Zanchi won the Junior 85 class in the Italian International Supercross Championship and finished second in the 85 Junior class of the Italian Junior Motocross Championship. Zanchi finished third in the 85 Senior class of the Italian Junior Championship in 2019. He also raced in the FIM Motocross Junior World Championship, which was staged in his native Italy, where he finished eighth in the opening race. In the EMX85 class of the 2019 European Motocross Championship, he finished sixteenth overall - again finishing eighth in the opening race.

For the 2020 season, he joined the Husqvarna Junior Racing Maddii team. Zanchi was involved in a controversial ending to the 2020 Italian Junior Motocross Championship. After initially being crowned champion in the 85 Senior class due to rival Alfio Pulvirenti jumping on a red-cross flag, an appeal lodged in January 2021 found Zanchi had also jumped on the red-cross flag. This resulted in Zanchi being docked positions that left him third in the final standings. He made his debut in the EMX125 class of the 2020 European Motocross Championship at the fifth round where he scored a point.

Zanchi was signed by MJC Yamaha for 2021, Yamaha's official team in the EMX125 class of the 2021 European Motocross Championship. He made an immediate impact on the class, being classified as the race winner in the second race at the opening round, after the race was red-flagged due to a crash he had. Zanchi missed the second round due to the injuries sustained in this crash but would take a second race at the fourth round in France, while he finished the season ninth in the final standings.

Staying with the MJC Yamaha team for 2022, Zanchi started the season by finishing second in the 125 class of the Italian International Motocross Championship. This good form was carried through to the start of the 2022 European Motocross Championship, where he won the opening race. He was able to pick up one overall podium throughout the year and finished seventh in the final standings. Zanchi represented Italy at the FIM Junior World Championship where he finished sixth and the Motocross of European Nations, where he was part of the team that finished second overall. Domestically, Zanchi enjoyed a dominant season in the Italian Junior Championship, winning all but one race to take the 125 Junior crown.

=== 250 Career ===
Zanchi moved up to compete in the EMX250 class of the 2023 European Motocross Championship, being signed by KTM's factory team in the championship. He adapted quickly to the new class, scoring two consecutive podiums at the second and third rounds. Zanchi took his first race win in the class in the opening race at the sixth round in Germany, a feat he followed up two rounds later in The Netherlands. A third race win came at the final round and he finished the season in fourth in the standings. Alongside this, he made three wildcard appearances in the MX2 class of the 2023 FIM Motocross World Championship. On each occasion he showed speed that saw him race inside the top-ten, with an eighth in the second race at the French round being a noticeable result. Domestically, Zanchi competed in the Elite MX2 class of the Italian Prestige Motocross Championship, finishing fifth in the final standings with two race wins.

Zanchi was signed by the Honda's factory Team HRC squad for the MX2 class of the 2024 FIM Motocross World Championship. He took the overall win at his first pre-season race on the factory Honda in Riola Sardo. The World Championship season started with a strong sixth overall at the opening round but injuries sustained in a practice crash saw him miss rounds three, four and five. His return saw him qualify in fourth place at the sixth round and throughout the rest of the season he placed regularly within the top-ten to finish tenth in the final standings. At the conclusion of the season, Zanchi travelled to Japan to race a Japanese championship round on a 450, winning both races. In deep mud at the second round of the 2025 FIM Motocross World Championship, Zanchi took his first MX2 world championship race win and overall podium. After not being able to match this form over the next seven rounds, Zanchi sustain a season-ending knee injury at the MXGP of Germany.

Zanchi left Honda at the end of the 2025 season, becoming Ducati's first rider in the MX2 class, piloting the manufacturers new 250cc motorcycle for the 2026 season. It would turn out to be an injury hit first season aboard the Ducati however, as Zanchi firstly missed the opening three world championship rounds due to an injury picked up pre-season. Upon his return, he had to ride himself back into form at grand prix level, but by halfway through the season, he had begun to feature in the top ten more regularly. A big crash at the British round derailed this, as a back injury then ruled him out until the penultimate event. After riding the final two grand prix, Zanchi made his debut representing his country at the 2026 Motocross des Nations. Zanchi's only race win of the season came at the second round of the 2026 Italian Prestige Motocross Championship, where he won the opening race.

== Honours ==
Motocross of European Nations

- Team Overall: 2022 (silver)

Italian International Motocross Championship

- 125: 2022 (silver)

Italian Junior Motocross Championship

- 125 Junior: 2022 (gold)
- 85 Senior: 2019 & 2020 (bronze)
- 85 Junior: 2018 (silver)
- 65 Cadetti: 2017 (gold)

Italian International Supercross Championship

- Junior 85: 2018 (gold)

== MXGP Results ==
Year	Rnd 1	Rnd 2	Rnd 3	Rnd 4	Rnd 5	Rnd 6	Rnd 7	Rnd 8	Rnd 9	Rnd 10	Rnd 11	Rnd 12	Rnd 13	Rnd 14	Rnd 15	Rnd 16	Rnd 17	Rnd 18	Rnd 19	Rnd 20	Average Finish	Podium Percent	Place
2025 MX2	16	3	10	11	9	13	6	7	12	OUT	OUT	OUT	OUT	OUT	OUT	OUT	OUT	OUT	OUT	OUT	9.56	11%	15th
2026 MX2	OUT ARG (Argentina)	OUT AND (Andalusia)	OUT SUI (Switzerland)	18 SAR (Sardinia)	18 TRE	13 FRA (France)	13 GER (Germany)	12 LAT (Latvia)	12 ITA (Italy)	11 POR (Portugal)	13 RSA (South Africa)	DNF GBR (United Kingdom)	OUT CZE (Czech Republic)	OUT FLA (Flanders)	OUT SWE (Sweden)	OUT NED (Netherlands)	OUT TUR (Turkey)	9 CHN (China)	10 AUS (Australia)	-	12.90	-	14th
