= Alessandro Lupino =

Italian motorcycle racer (born 1991)

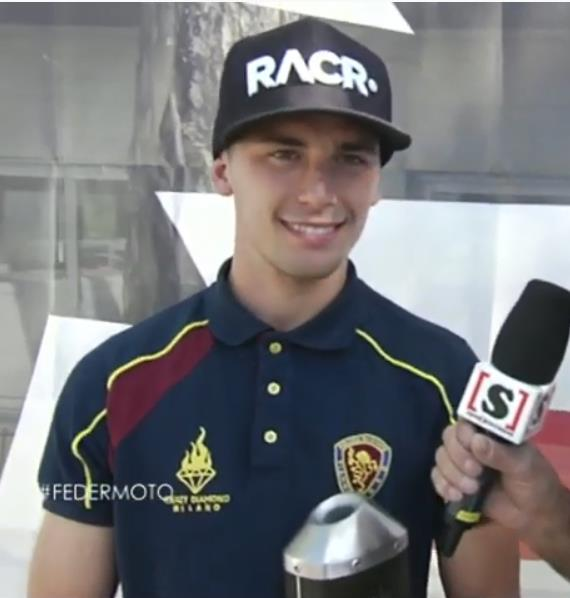
- Alessandro Lupino in 2017.
- Nationality: Italian
- Born: 15 January 1991 (age 35) Viterbo, Italy

Motocross career
- Years active: 2006–present
- Teams: Yamaha, Ducati
- Championships: 8

Alessandro Lupino (born 15 January 1991) is an Italian professional motocross racer.

Along with Tony Cairoli, Lupino helped develop the Ducati Desmo450.

== Honours ==
Motocross of Nations

- Team Overall: 2021 (gold)

Italian Prestige Motocross Championship

- MX1: 2015, 2016, 2017, 2018, 2021, 2024 (gold)

European Motocross Championship

- 85cc: 2006 (gold)

Italian Junior Motocross Championship

- 85cc: 2006 (gold)
