= 2024 Italian Prestige Motocross Championship =

Italian National Motocross Competition in 2024

The 2024 Italian Prestige Motocross Championship season was the 16th edition of the Italian Motocross Championship carrying the 'Prestige' moniker.

The series had six rounds across the country, running from March to late September. Alberto Forato was the reigning champion in the MX1 Elite class, after winning his second title in 2023. Due to injuries and switching teams, Forato was only able to ride a single round of the season.

The season was notable as it saw the competitive international debut of Ducati's 450cc motocross bike in the MX1 Elite class, ridden by former champion Alessandro Lupino. After taking three race wins and two overall round victories, Lupino was able to take his sixth national title. This meant that Ducati were able to win a title in their first season competing with the new 450cc bike.

Cas Valk was the reigning champion in the MX2 Elite class, but he did not defend his title due to moving to a team not based in Italy. Former European Champion Valerio Lata dominated the class, winning every round and all but two races to take his first senior national title.

== Race calendar and results ==
The full calendar with both dates and venues was released on 28 November.

=== MX1 ===
Round	Date	Location	Race 1 Winner	Race 2 Winner	Round Winner
1	16–17 March	(Lombardy) Mantova	(Italy) Alessandro Lupino	(Sweden) Isak Gifting	(Sweden) Isak Gifting
2	20–21 April	(Marche) Cingoli	(Italy) Giuseppe Tropepe	(Slovenia) Jan Pancar	(Sweden) Isak Gifting
3	25–26 May	(Tuscany) Montevarchi	(Italy) Andrea Bonacorsi	(Italy) Andrea Bonacorsi	(Italy) Andrea Bonacorsi
4	22–23 June	(Tuscany) Ponte a Egola	(Italy) Tony Cairoli	(Italy) Alessandro Lupino	(Italy) Alessandro Lupino
5	31 August–1 September	(Umbria) Castiglione del Lago	(Italy) Alessandro Lupino	(Italy) Andrea Bonacorsi	(Italy) Alessandro Lupino
6	12–13 October	(Trentino-Alto Adige/Südtirol) Pietramurata	(Italy) Andrea Bonacorsi	(Italy) Andrea Bonacorsi	(Italy) Andrea Bonacorsi

=== MX2 ===
Round	Date	Location	Race 1 Winner	Race 2 Winner	Round Winner
1	16–17 March	(Lombardy) Mantova	(Italy) Valerio Lata	(Italy) Valerio Lata	(Italy) Valerio Lata
2	20–21 April	(Marche) Cingoli	(Italy) Valerio Lata	(Italy) Valerio Lata	(Italy) Valerio Lata
3	25–26 May	(Tuscany) Montevarchi	(Italy) Valerio Lata	(Italy) Valerio Lata	(Italy) Valerio Lata
4	22–23 June	(Tuscany) Ponte a Egola	(Italy) Valerio Lata	(Spain) Yago Martínez	(Italy) Valerio Lata
5	31 August–1 September	(Umbria) Castiglione del Lago	(Italy) Valerio Lata	(Italy) Valerio Lata	(Italy) Valerio Lata
6	12–13 October	(Trentino-Alto Adige/Südtirol) Pietramurata	(Denmark) Mads Fredsøe	(Italy) Valerio Lata	(Italy) Valerio Lata

=== Circuit locations ===
2024 Italian Prestige Motocross Championship locations

== MX1 ==
=== Participants ===
Elite Riders
Team	Constructor	No	Rider	Rounds
Standing Construct Honda MXGP	Honda	1	(Italy) Alberto Forato	4
FM CAMI Racing Team	Honda	3	(Italy) Federico Tuani	6
FM CAMI Racing Team	Honda	37	(Italy) Yuri Quarti	2–5
FM CAMI Racing Team	Honda	771	(Italy) Simone Croci	1–4, 6
Scoccia Racing Team	Kawasaki	19	(Italy) David Philippaerts	3–6
Scoccia Racing Team	Kawasaki	85	(France) Cédric Soubeyras	1–4, 6
Beta Motorcycles	Beta	31	(Italy) Francesco Bassi	1–5
Kros Team Lunardi Racing	Honda	43	(Italy) Davide De Bortoli	1–3
JK Racing Yamaha	Yamaha	60	(Sweden) Anton Nagy	1–3
JK Racing Yamaha	Yamaha	577	(Sweden) Isak Gifting	All
PB Racing	Suzuki	61	(Slovakia) Jakub Hruška	2
Ducati Corse R&D Factory MX Team	Ducati	77	(Italy) Alessandro Lupino	All
Ducati Corse R&D Factory MX Team	Ducati	222	(Italy) Tony Cairoli	4
A-Team Honda	Honda	110	(Italy) Matteo Puccinelli	5–6
A-Team Honda	Honda	313	(Italy) Tommaso Isdraele	1–4
MRT Racing Team Beta	Beta	128	(Italy) Ivo Monticelli	1–2, 5
Monster Energy Yamaha Factory MXGP Team	Yamaha	132	(Italy) Andrea Bonacorsi	3, 5–6
Martin Racing Technology	Honda	161	(Sweden) Alvin Östlund	All
Martin Racing Technology	Honda	397	(Italy) Yuri Pasqualini	1–3
Husqvarna Promoto Racing Team	Husqvarna	199	(Czech Republic) Rudolf Plch	6
Amsil Racing FZ Motorsport KTM	KTM	200	(Italy) Filippo Zonta	All
Mňuk Racing Team	Yamaha	210	(Czech Republic) Roman Mňuk	1
FRT Motorsport	Kawasaki	211	(Italy) Nicholas Lapucci	6
FRT Motorsport	Kawasaki	499	(Italy) Emanuele Alberio	1–3
Millionaire Racing Team - ABF Italia	Honda	223	(Italy) Giuseppe Tropepe	All
TEM JP253 KTM Racing Team	KTM	253	(Slovenia) Jan Pancar	All
MB Team	Honda	430	(France) Christophe Charlier	1–2
MB Team	Honda	878	(Italy) Stefano Pezzuto	3–6
Tecno B Racing	Honda	878	(Italy) Stefano Pezzuto	2
LC Racing Team	Yamaha	878	(Italy) Stefano Pezzuto	1
Yamaha Motor Schweiz	Yamaha	453	(Switzerland) Flavio Wolf	All
KTM Zauner Racing	KTM	537	(Austria) Florian Hellrigl	1
Mqworld Factory Racing Team	KTM	644	(Italy) Ismaele Guarise	All
	Yamaha	750	(Sweden) Samuel Flink	1
GCC Swiss Racing Team	Husqvarna	760	(Switzerland) Nicolas Bender	1
	Husqvarna	779	(Switzerland) Cyril Zurbrügg	1–3, 5–6
	Yamaha	956	(Sweden) Pontus Lindblad	1
Team Giunta Factory	Honda	974	(Italy) Mario Tamai	All
Fast Riders
Team	Constructor	No	Rider	Rounds
Team Borz	Honda	2	(Italy) Luca Borz	1
Action Shop	Husqvarna	14	(Italy) Pietro Salina	5
	Honda	21	(Italy) Marco Lolli	1
MCR Racing Team	Husqvarna	35	(Italy) Alessandro Lentini	All
Dreams Racing	KTM	41	(Italy) Antonio Schiochet	1–3
Salucci Racing Service	KTM	42	(Italy) Andrea Cicogni	3
Scoccia Racing Team	Kawasaki	46	(Italy) Nicola Recchia	1–5
	KTM	57	(Italy) Francesco Antoniazzi	1–3
Team Castellari	Gas Gas	62	(Italy) Davide Zampino	All
Team Castellari	Honda	151	(Italy) Giacomo Bosi	6
Racing Team Padovano Moto	Yamaha	68	(Italy) Luca Cardaccia	All
Brunetti Motors/Pardi Royal Pat	KTM	86	(Italy) Matteo Del Coco	3–4
52 Racing Team	Yamaha	89	(Italy) Thomas Berto	3
	Honda	92	(Italy) Denni Del Federico	2
	Honda	102	(Italy) Tomas Ragadini	3
Team 505 Racing	KTM	109	(Italy) Riccardo Cencioni	All
GPX Motocross Team	Husqvarna	117	(Italy) Nicola Cariolato	1–5
GPX Motocross Team	Husqvarna	385	(Italy) Sebastian Zenato	1–2, 4, 6
GPX Motocross Team	Husqvarna	838	(Italy) Paolo Ermini	1–3, 5–6
	Honda	143	(Italy) Mirco Munari	4, 6
	Fantic	156	(Italy) Leonardo Tanganelli	4–5
A.B. Racing Team	Gas Gas	160	(Italy) Riccardo Savoi	3–4
	Honda	173	(Italy) Georg Falser	1, 3, 6
Fantic Racing	Fantic	188	(Italy) Marco Roncaglia	1, 3
Team Giunta Factory	Honda	197	(Italy) Gabriele Arbini	All
	Honda	198	(Italy) Erison Lagaren	1–4
	Honda	202	(Italy) Leobruno Di Biase	1, 4
DS214 Motosport	KTM	214	(Italy) Daniele Salone	2–3
DMU Technology Team	Honda	221	(Italy) Matteo Ungaro	1, 3
	Honda	224	(Italy) Alessandro Brugnoni	All
Millionaire Racing Team - ABF Italia	Honda	228	(Italy) Emilio Scuteri	1–4, 6
	Honda	232	(Italy) Andrea Testella	2
	Fantic	250	(Italy) Manfredi Caruso	3–4
	Beta	263	(Italy) Alfredo Memoli	All
	KTM	270	(Italy) Matteo Apolloni	All
MDR Racing Team	Yamaha	308	(Italy) Lorenzo Albieri	1, 3–6
Pardi Racing Team	KTM	311	(Italy) Mirko Dal Bosco	All
Fuorigiri Caserta	Gas Gas	333	(Italy) Nicola Di Luccia	2
	Fantic	338	(Italy) Carlo Coda	1–2
	Husqvarna	343	(Italy) Marcello Pierfederici	1
	Yamaha	370	(Italy) Giacomo Ragazzini	3–4
Jump Racing Team	Fantic	373	(Italy) Alessio Bonetta	1–2
	Gas Gas	374	(Italy) Gabriele Oteri	1–3, 6
A.B. Gas Gas Racing Team	Gas Gas	375	(Italy) Edoardo Cagno	6
FRT Motorsport	Kawasaki	384	(Italy) Lorenzo Camporese	1–2
360 Race Team	Gas Gas	394	(Italy) Christian Bisogni	5
MB Team	Honda	399	(Italy) Pietro Trinchieri	1
MB Team	Honda	791	(Italy) Marco Valsangiacomo	All
	Yamaha	424	(Italy) Davide Giustacchini	1–3, 5
F.E. Racing Team	Yamaha	450	(Italy) Andrea Fossi	All
Megan Racing	KTM	510	(Italy) Nicola Matteucci	3
AB15 Motorsport	Yamaha	515	(Italy) Adriano Bazzucchi	3–4
Bocadillo Racing	Yamaha	517	(Italy) Pablo Caspani	2
	Honda	566	(Italy) Gianluca Nebbia	1–2, 4–6
JRT MX Team	Honda	599	(Italy) Manuel Ciarlo	1–2, 4–5
	Beta	609	(Italy) Fabiomassimo Palombini	1–2
	Suzuki	702	(Italy) Michele d'Aniello	2–3, 5–6
	Kawasaki	715	(Italy) Leonardo Lazzeri	3
	Yamaha	717	(Italy) Stefano Monti	2–6
	KTM	724	(Italy) Cristian Cantergiani	All
	Husqvarna	737	(Italy) Lorenzo Fondelli	4
Asel Project MX Racing Team	Yamaha	756	(Italy) Elder Firino	6
	KTM	773	(Italy) Alessio Croci	1, 3, 6
	Kawasaki	828	(Italy) Davide Pavan	1
AL860 Motorsport	Honda	860	(Italy) Andrea La Scala	1–2
	Kawasaki	949	(Italy) Alessandro Contessi	1–5
Motostyle Racing Team	Fantic	977	(Italy) Simone Tabone	1, 3
Caparvi Racing Team	Yamaha	999	(Italy) Elia Alamanni	3–5

=== Riders Championship ===
Points are awarded to riders in both the A and B group races, in the following format:

Place	1	2	3	4	5	6	7	8	9	10	11	12	13	14	15	16	17	18	19	20	21	22	23	24	25	26	27	28	29	30	31	32	33	34	35	36	37	38	39	40
Group A	250	210	170	140	120	110	100	90	85	80	77	74	72	70	68	66	64	63	62	61	60	59	58	57	56	55	54	53	52	51	50	49	48	47	46	45	44	43	42	41
Group B	40	39	38	37	36	35	34	33	32	31	30	29	28	27	26	25	24	23	22	21	20	19	18	17	16	15	14	13	12	11	10	9	8	7	6	5	4	3	2	1

Pos	Rider	Bike	MAN (Lombardy)		CIN (Marche)		MON (Tuscany)		PAE (Tuscany)		CDL (Umbria)		PIE (Trentino-Alto Adige/Südtirol)		Points
Elite Riders
1	(Italy) Alessandro Lupino	Ducati	1	7	3	3	37	2	2	1	1	2	4	3	2174
2	(Slovenia) Jan Pancar	KTM	8	25	6	1	2	3	5	4	2	3	2	2	1946
3	(Italy) Giuseppe Tropepe	Honda	2	5	1	4	3	6	3	3	36	35	Ret	DNS	1431
4	(Sweden) Alvin Östlund	Honda	3	4	7	Ret	8	5	4	5	4	5	5	4	1400
5	(Italy) Andrea Bonacorsi	Yamaha					1	1			5	1	1	1	1370
6	(Sweden) Isak Gifting	Yamaha	6	1	2	2	7	4	18	9	DNS	DNS	DNS	DNS	1168
7	(France) Cédric Soubeyras	Kawasaki	5	3	5	5	4	8	9	Ret			3	5	1135
8	(Italy) Filippo Zonta	KTM	16	19	15	31	10	11	Ret	10	9	7	8	7	858
9	(Italy) Simone Croci	Honda	13	13	9	8	9	14	Ret	8			6	6	784
10	(Italy) Stefano Pezzuto	Yamaha	11	9											771
10	(Italy) Stefano Pezzuto	Honda			10	33	11	10	Ret	Ret	10	10	12	8	771
11	(Italy) Ismaele Guarise	KTM	12	11	19	14	17	19	DNS	DNS	12	8	11	12	724
12	(Italy) Yuri Quarti	Honda			11	9	12	7	8	11	6	6			723
13	(Italy) Mario Tamai	Honda	25	36	24	21	22	20	20	21	18	21	25	18	701
14	(Italy) David Philippaerts	Kawasaki					6	9	7	7	7	9	13	34	699
15	(Italy) Ivo Monticelli	Beta	4	12	DNS	DNS					3	4			524
16	(Italy) Francesco Bassi	Beta	1 (B)	1 (B)	Ret	16	16	15	Ret	12	8	13			516
17	(Switzerland) Flavio Wolf	Yamaha	12 (B)	6 (B)	29	25	25	26	DNS	23	37	DNS	26	23	498
18	(Italy) Tony Cairoli	Ducati							1	2					460
19	(Italy) Davide De Bortoli	Honda	10	8	13	7	15	36							455
20	(Switzerland) Cyril Zurbrügg	Husqvarna	Ret (B)	4 (B)	9 (B)	6 (B)	28	29			26	36	21	26	424
21	(Italy) Tommaso Isdraele	Honda	Ret	22	12	10	13	13	Ret	DNS					357
22	(Italy) Emanuele Alberio	Kawasaki	14	10	8	11	DNS (B)	DNS (B)							317
23	(Italy) Yuri Pasqualini	Honda	17	14	14	12	DNS	DNS							278
24	(Italy) Matteo Puccinelli	Honda									20	16	17	13	263
25	(France) Christophe Charlier	Honda	9	6	36	DNS									240
26	(Sweden) Anton Nagy	Yamaha	15	21	23	35	DNS	DNS							232
27	(Italy) Alberto Forato	Honda							6	6					220
28	(Italy) Nicholas Lapucci	Kawasaki											7	10	180
29	(Italy) Federico Tuani	Honda											9	9	170
30	(Czech Republic) Rudolf Plch	Husqvarna											14	14	140
31	(Austria) Florian Hellrigl	KTM	18	15											131
32	(Switzerland) Nicolas Bender	Husqvarna	24	16											123
33	(Czech Republic) Roman Mňuk	Yamaha	32	29											101
34	(Sweden) Samuel Flink	Yamaha	4 (B)	11 (B)											67
35	(Sweden) Pontus Lindblad	Yamaha	14 (B)	18 (B)											50
36	(Slovakia) Jakub Hruška	Suzuki			DNS (B)	10 (B)									31
Fast Riders
1	(Italy) Emilio Scuteri	Honda	7	2	4	6	5	12	Ret	DNS			10	11	911
2	(Italy) Mirko Dal Bosco	KTM	23	20	21	15	32	24	14	15	17	14	20	20	747
3	(Italy) Alessandro Brugnoni	Honda	39	23	26	18	18	23	11	20	14	15	18	19	740
4	(Italy) Gabriele Arbini	Honda	20	18	25	20	21	21	12	22	13	12	34	35	733
5	(Italy) Alessandro Lentini	Husqvarna	34	32	17	19	24	27	DNS	19	16	19	19	28	638
6	(Italy) Alessandro Contessi	Kawasaki	21	17	20	17	19	25	16	18	19	18			621
7	(Italy) Alfredo Memoli	Beta	Ret (B)	14 (B)	22	24	31	31	10	13	21	20	35	24	619
8	(Italy) Nicola Recchia	Kawasaki	19	24	30	23	36	17	19	17	11	11			617
9	(Italy) Luca Cardaccia	Yamaha	3 (B)	3 (B)	28	26	35	30	Ret	14	22	22	28	22	581
10	(Italy) Gianluca Nebbia	Honda	30	26	32	30			21	24	27	25	23	25	547
11	(Italy) Matteo Apolloni	KTM	37	33	3 (B)	7 (B)	34	34	22	DNS	25	26	24	30	536
12	(Italy) Riccardo Cencioni	KTM	22 (B)	23 (B)	35	34	6 (B)	7 (B)	15	28	28	33	33	33	517
13	(Italy) Marco Valsangiacomo	Honda	8 (B)	7 (B)	34	32	2 (B)	1 (B)	Ret	27	30	30	32	31	497
14	(Italy) Michele d'Aniello	Suzuki			18	29	20	22			35	34	15	16	462
15	(Italy) Paolo Ermini	Husqvarna	36	28	27	22	DNS	Ret			15	17	36	15	456
16	(Italy) Andrea Fossi	Yamaha	17 (B)	22 (B)	12 (B)	4 (B)	11 (B)	12 (B)	Ret	26	31	23	1 (B)	1 (B)	411
17	(Italy) Stefano Monti	Yamaha			11 (B)	3 (B)	14 (B)	5 (B)	1 (B)	2 (B)	33	28	30	32	411
18	(Italy) Davide Zampino	Gas Gas	15 (B)	19 (B)	1 (B)	2 (B)	9 (B)	8 (B)	2 (B)	1 (B)	24	24	DSQ	DSQ	385
19	(Italy) Antonio Schiochet	KTM	28	31	16	13	26	35							342
20	(Italy) Lorenzo Albieri	Yamaha	7 (B)	10 (B)			30	32	DNS	DNS	23	32	Ret	17	336
21	(Italy) Nicola Cariolato	Husqvarna	20 (B)	21 (B)	13 (B)	9 (B)	15 (B)	14 (B)	6 (B)	3 (B)	32	31			326
22	(Italy) Sebastian Zenato	Husqvarna	9 (B)	9 (B)	2 (B)	1 (B)			13	DNS			29	27	321
23	(Italy) Cristian Cantergiani	KTM	21 (B)	25 (B)	DNS (B)	DNS (B)	16 (B)	16 (B)	3 (B)	5 (B)	DSQ	29	5 (B)	5 (B)	284
24	(Italy) Erison Lagaren	Honda	26	38	37	Ret	23	18	DNS	DNS					263
25	(Italy) Gabriele Oteri	Gas Gas	31	27	31	27	DNS (B)	DNS (B)					31	Ret	258
26	(Italy) Elia Alamanni	Yamaha					8 (B)	3 (B)	7 (B)	7 (B)	34	27			240
27	(Italy) Davide Giustacchini	Yamaha	11 (B)	15 (B)	6 (B)	DNS (B)	5 (B)	2 (B)			29	Ret			218
28	(Italy) Alessio Croci	KTM	6 (B)	26 (B)			4 (B)	18 (B)					27	29	216
29	(Italy) Manuel Ciarlo	Honda	5 (B)	2 (B)	Ret (B)	DNS (B)			17	16	DNS (B)	DNS (B)			205
30	(Italy) Leonardo Tanganelli	Fantic							8 (B)	4 (B)	2 (B)	2 (B)			148
31	(Italy) Francesco Antoniazzi	KTM	2 (B)	5 (B)	4 (B)	8 (B)	Ret (B)	DNS (B)							145
32	(Italy) Riccardo Savoi	Gas Gas					10 (B)	6 (B)	4 (B)	6 (B)					138
33	(Italy) Matteo Del Coco	KTM					14	16	Ret	DNS					136
34	(Italy) Georg Falser	Honda	23 (B)	24 (B)			18 (B)	Ret (B)					4 (B)	3 (B)	133
35	(Italy) Giacomo Ragazzini	Yamaha					3 (B)	4 (B)	Ret	25					131
36	(Italy) Fabiomassimo Palombini	Beta	10 (B)	13 (B)	7 (B)	11 (B)									123
37	(Italy) Giacomo Bosi	Honda											22	21	119
38	(Italy) Mirco Munari	Honda							5 (B)	Ret (B)			2 (B)	2 (B)	114
39	(Italy) Edoardo Cagno	Gas Gas											16	36	111
40	(Italy) Matteo Ungaro	Honda	19 (B)	17 (B)			13 (B)	9 (B)							106
41	(Italy) Pietro Trinchieri	Honda	22	35											105
42	(Italy) Tomas Ragadini	Honda					29	28							105
43	(Italy) Carlo Coda	Fantic	29	30	DNS	DNS									103
44	(Italy) Lorenzo Camporese	Kawasaki	DNS (B)	DNS (B)	33	28									101
45	(Italy) Simone Tabone	Fantic	DNS (B)	DNS (B)			27	37							98
46	(Italy) Luca Borz	Honda	27	39											96
47	(Italy) Manfredi Caruso	Fantic					33	33	Ret	DNS					96
48	(Italy) Marcello Pierfederici	Husqvarna	38	34											90
49	(Italy) Leobruno Di Biase	Honda	35	37					Ret	Ret					90
50	(Italy) Pietro Salina	Husqvarna									38	37			87
51	(Italy) Christian Bisogni	Gas Gas									1 (B)	1 (B)			80
52	(Italy) Andrea La Scala	Honda	18 (B)	16 (B)	10 (B)	DNS (B)									79
53	(Italy) Elder Firino	Yamaha											3 (B)	4 (B)	75
54	(Italy) Denni Del Federico	Honda			5 (B)	5 (B)									72
55	(Italy) Nicola Matteucci	KTM					1 (B)	11 (B)							70
56	(Italy) Thomas Berto	Yamaha					12 (B)	10 (B)							60
57	(Italy) Andrea Cicogni	KTM					7 (B)	17 (B)							58
58	(Italy) Alessio Bonetta	Fantic	16 (B)	12 (B)	DNS (B)	DNS (B)									54
59	(Italy) Leonardo Lazzeri	Kawasaki					17 (B)	13 (B)							52
60	(Italy) Marco Lolli	Honda	24 (B)	8 (B)											50
61	(Italy) Davide Pavan	Kawasaki	13 (B)	20 (B)											49
62	(Italy) Marco Roncaglia	Fantic	33	Ret			DNS (B)	DNS (B)							48
63	(Italy) Adriano Bazzucchi	Yamaha					19 (B)	15 (B)	DNS (B)	DNS (B)					48
64	(Italy) Daniele Salone	KTM			DNS (B)	DNS (B)	20 (B)	19 (B)							43
65	(Italy) Andrea Testella	Honda			8 (B)	Ret (B)									33
66	(Italy) Pablo Caspani	Yamaha			Ret (B)	12 (B)									29
67	(Italy) Nicola Di Luccia	Gas Gas			14 (B)	DNS (B)									27
	(Italy) Lorenzo Fondelli	Husqvarna							Ret (B)	DNS (B)					0
Pos	Rider	Bike	MAN (Lombardy)		CIN (Marche)		MON (Tuscany)		PAE (Tuscany)		CDL (Umbria)		PIE (Trentino-Alto Adige/Südtirol)		Points

== MX2 ==
=== Participants ===
Elite Riders
Team	Constructor	No	Rider	Rounds
Beddini Gas Gas Factory Juniors	Gas Gas	1	(Italy) Valerio Lata	All
Beddini Gas Gas Factory Juniors	Gas Gas	51	(Denmark) Mads Fredsøe	All
Maggiora Park Racing Team	KTM	49	(Italy) Mattia Dusi	All
Diana MX Team	Husqvarna	56	(Italy) Lorenzo Corti	5–6
Steels Dr. Jack TM Racing	TM	67	(Spain) Yago Martínez	All
LB Racing Team	KTM	74	(Italy) Alessandro Valeri	1–3
SDM Corse Fantic Racing	Fantic	97	(Italy) Simone Mancini	6
A-Team Honda	Honda	110	(Italy) Matteo Puccinelli	1–4
A-Team Honda	Honda	313	(Italy) Tommaso Isdraele	6
Motormix Racing Team	Gas Gas	111	(Italy) Alessandro Manucci	All
Fantic Factory Racing MX2	Fantic	133	(Netherlands) Kay Karssemakers	1
	KTM	165	(Latvia) Ralfs Vindigs	1
MotoXGeneration Husqvarna Slovenia	Husqvarna	183	(Slovenia) Jaka Peklaj	1
GCC Swiss Racing Team	KTM	205	(Switzerland) Anthony Franc	1, 4
	KTM	211	(Italy) Nicholas Lapucci	3
MaxBart Motorsport	Husqvarna	211	(Italy) Nicholas Lapucci	1–2
MaxBart Motorsport	Husqvarna	669	(Italy) Luca Ruffini	1–4, 6
SM Action Fantic Racing Team	Fantic	217	(France) Alexis Fueri	1
Honda RedMoto World Enduro Team	Honda	321	(Italy) Samuele Bernardini	1–3, 5
Team Castellari	Gas Gas	241	(Italy) Giovanni Meneghello	1, 5–6
Yamaha Motor Slovenija	Yamaha	342	(Slovenia) Žan Oven	1
JK Racing Yamaha	Yamaha	371	(Italy) Manuel Iacopi	1–3, 5
Team REDS420	KTM	420	(Italy) Andrea Rossi	1, 3–4
	Gas Gas	743	(Latvia) Roberts Lūsis	1
Ghidinelli Racing	Yamaha	744	(France) Saad Soulimani	All
JRT MX Team	Honda	880	(Italy) Matteo Luigi Russi	3–6
MCR Racing Team	Husqvarna	931	(San Marino) Andrea Zanotti	All
Mecamotor KTM	KTM	938	(Brazil) Rodolfo Bicalho	1, 5
Fast Riders
Team	Constructor	No	Rider	Rounds
04 Park Monte Coralli	Yamaha	4	(Italy) Andrea Dovizioso	
	Gas Gas	7	(Italy) Eros Arico	3, 6
	Fantic	10	(Italy) Giorgio Macrì	All
Team Castellari	Gas Gas	11	(Italy) Giacomo Bosi	All
Team Castellari	Honda	295	(Italy) Federico Biserni	2–3
	TM	12	(Italy) Luca Rosati	All
	KTM	13	(Italy) Alessandro Facca	All
Tognetti Racing Department	KTM	22	(Italy) Raffaele Giuzio	1, 3–4
KTM Cavamotor Team	KTM	23	(Italy) Tommaso Sarasso	All
Pardi Racing Team	KTM	25	(Italy) Alessandro Sadovschi	2–3, 5–6
Pardi Racing Team	KTM	59	(Italy) Andrea Roberti	All
Team Fix Racing	TM	33	(Italy) Samuele Casadei	2, 4–6
	Honda	45	(Italy) Federico Marion	1
	KTM	54	(Italy) Simone D'Agata	1
	KTM	66	(Italy) Andrea Davoli	1, 3, 6
	Honda	69	(Italy) Sebastiano Romano	3–6
Steels Dr. Jack TM Racing	TM	70	(Italy) Brando Rispoli	2–6
FlyOver Competition Gaerne	Kawasaki	71	(Italy) Morgan Bennati	All
Team Seven Motorsport	KTM	79	(Italy) Nicola Salvini	2–4
Team Seven Motorsport	KTM	240	(Chile) César Paine	1–2
Team Seven Motorsport	KTM	212	(Italy) Alfio Pulvirenti	1–2
	Yamaha	212	(Italy) Alfio Pulvirenti	3
MaxBart Motorsport	Husqvarna	212	(Italy) Alfio Pulvirenti	4–6
LB Racing	Yamaha	82	(Italy) Mattia Giampieri	2
Team Alba Racing	Kawasaki	88	(Italy) Ramon Savioli	All
	KTM	91	(Italy) Davide Nardi	1
	Yamaha	100	(Italy) Tiziano Peverieri	2
	KTM	124	(Italy) Riccardo Cavina	1, 4–5
Dream Team	Fantic	125	(Italy) Mattia Barbieri	4–6
	Honda	130	(Italy) Thomas Masciadri	3, 5
	Fantic	131	(Italy) Mattia Roncaglia	1, 3
	Honda	134	(Italy) Emanuel Paglialunga	1–3
Best Matic Team	Kawasaki	140	(Italy) Tommaso Lodi	All
SRS Racing Team	Honda	142	(Italy) Denny Bastianon	All
Dreams Racing	KTM	144	(Italy) Francesco Bellei	All
Dreams Racing	KTM	920	(Italy) Luca Moro	All
Bardahl Junior Racing Team	KTM	146	(Italy) Davide Brandini	All
Bardahl Junior Racing Team	KTM	336	(Italy) Lorenzo Aglietti	All
	KTM	153	(Italy) Riccardo Bindi	3–6
	Husqvarna	203	(Italy) Cosimo Bellocci	3
	Husqvarna	204	(Italy) Edoardo Volpicelli	1–3
MCV Motorsport ABF Italia	Fantic	211	(Italy) Riccardo Pini	6
	Honda	227	(Italy) Vincenzo Giarrizzo	1–5
	Husqvarna	231	(Italy) Jacopo Pasqualotto	1, 4–6
Motormix Racing Team	Husqvarna	234	(Italy) Samuele Ghetti	1
	Husqvarna	237	(Italy) Gabriele Barbieri	4
	KTM	251	(Italy) Simone Pavan	1
McDonald's Racing Team	KTM	259	(Italy) Manuel Cavina	1–3
Marchetto Racing Team	KTM	269	(Italy) Pietro Dal Fitto	All
JK Racing Yamaha	Yamaha	284	(Italy) Giorgio Orlando	1
	Husqvarna	292	(Italy) Alex Trento	6
Insubria Team Motocross	Yamaha	317	(Italy) Niccolò Mannini	6
Diana MX Team	Husqvarna	319	(Italy) Giuseppe Zangari	1
	Fantic	322	(Italy) Filippo Gervasio	1–2
	Husqvarna	323	(Italy) Tommaso Cape	3–4
	KTM	327	(Italy) Alessandro Traversini	2
Ghidinelli Racing	Yamaha	329	(Italy) Maurizio Scollo	All
	Gas Gas	364	(Italy) Mattia Nardo	1–5
GB Racing Team	Husqvarna	382	(Italy) Gabriele Bonifazio	1–3
Tecno B Racing	Husqvarna	421	(Italy) Eugenio Barbaglia	1, 3
MCR Racing Team	Husqvarna	440	(Italy) Andrea Brilli	All
	Honda	467	(Italy) Alessio Righetti	1
	Honda	509	(Italy) Andrea Boriani	2
55 R.S. Racing Team	Yamaha	519	(Italy) Giacomo Marchisio	3–4
SRS Racing Team	Honda	523	(Italy) Manolo D'Ettorre	All
	Gas Gas	532	(Italy) Mirko Valsecchi	All
	Husqvarna	538	(Italy) Roberto Ciannavei	4–5
	Yamaha	558	(Italy) Pablo Zonta	6
	Gas Gas	567	(Italy) Brando Polato	1, 3–6
	Gas Gas	584	(Italy) Joele Faccio	1
	Gas Gas	660	(Italy) Andrea Squizzato	All
	Husqvarna	666	(Italy) Riccardo Oldani	1–2, 4–6
	KTM	701	(Italy) Riccardo Marchini	2
	Gas Gas	710	(Italy) Jeremi Scandiani	1–4
JRT MX Team	Honda	752	(Italy) Matteo Borghi	6
Mqworld Factory Racing Team	KTM	753	(Italy) Patrick Busatto	1, 3–5
	Beta	792	(Italy) Devid Tozzi	1–2
	KTM	814	(Italy) Filippo Falsetti	3
FlyOver Competition	Kawasaki	821	(Italy) Nathan Mariani	2–5
Turci Racing Team	KTM	831	(Italy) Paolo Martorano	2, 4–6
	Gas Gas	870	(Italy) Sebastiano Casamenti	1–4, 6
	Kawasaki	884	(Italy) Valerio Mannaioli	5
	TM	901	(Italy) Gennaro Utech	6
Team4Fun	KTM	921	(Italy) Andrea Cipriani	1–4
Maggiora Park Racing Team	KTM	928	(Italy) Vincenzo Bove	2–3, 5–6
A-Team Honda	Honda	937	(Italy) Francesco Ranieri	All
	Husqvarna	978	(Italy) Gabriele Biffi	1, 3

=== Riders Championship ===
Points are awarded to riders in both the A and B group races, in the following format:

Place	1	2	3	4	5	6	7	8	9	10	11	12	13	14	15	16	17	18	19	20	21	22	23	24	25	26	27	28	29	30	31	32	33	34	35	36	37	38	39	40
Group A	250	210	170	140	120	110	100	90	85	80	77	74	72	70	68	66	64	63	62	61	60	59	58	57	56	55	54	53	52	51	50	49	48	47	46	45	44	43	42	41
Group B	40	39	38	37	36	35	34	33	32	31	30	29	28	27	26	25	24	23	22	21	20	19	18	17	16	15	14	13	12	11	10	9	8	7	6	5	4	3	2	1

Pos	Rider	Bike	MAN (Lombardy)		CIN (Marche)		MON (Tuscany)		PAE (Tuscany)		CDL (Umbria)		PIE (Trentino-Alto Adige/Südtirol)		Points
Elite Riders
1	(Italy) Valerio Lata	KTM	1	1	1	1	1	1	1	2	1	1	2	1	2920
2	(Spain) Yago Martínez	TM	2	4	3	2	2	11	14	1	14	11	6	8	1684
3	(Italy) Alessandro Manucci	Gas Gas	5	2	2	DNS	7	10	4	5	2	2	12	10	1554
4	(Denmark) Mads Fredsøe	Gas Gas	10	34	5	3	5	6	7	7	5	6	1	2	1537
6	(San Marino) Andrea Zanotti	Husqvarna	9	7	4	6	17	33	16	3	9	5	9	5	1193
6	(France) Saad Soulimani	Yamaha	8	3	Ret	DNS	3	3	6	8	12	4	11	11	1168
7	(Italy) Samuele Bernardini	Honda	7	6	8	5	6	2			3	3			1080
8	(Italy) Andrea Rossi	KTM	4	5			9	5	3	4					775
9	(Italy) Mattia Dusi	KTM	23	22	Ret	17	19	20	13	22	21	18	15	21	686
10	(Italy) Luca Ruffini	Husqvarna	20	11	34	13	1 (B)	1 (B)	Ret	14			10	7	587
11	(Italy) Manuel Iacopi	Yamaha	6	17	7	11	DNS	DNS			15	36			464
12	(Italy) Matteo Puccinelli	Honda	18	12	23	16	11	32	DNS	Ret					387
13	(Italy) Matteo Luigi Russi	Honda					32	19	19	12	35	Ret	Ret	19	355
14	(Italy) Simone Mancini	Fantic											5	3	290
15	(Italy) Giovanni Meneghello	Gas Gas	32	DNS							24	34	20	13	286
16	(Italy) Nicholas Lapucci	Husqvarna	13	13	Ret	DNS									284
16	(Italy) Nicholas Lapucci	KTM					4	Ret							284
17	(Italy) Alessandro Valeri	KTM	16	19	19	35	DNS	DNS							236
18	(Italy) Lorenzo Corti	Husqvarna									40	23	30	24	207
19	(Brazil) Rodolfo Bicalho	KTM	17	18							12 (B)	7 (B)			190
20	(Netherlands) Kay Karssemakers	Fantic	14	8											160
21	(France) Alexis Fueri	Fantic	22	37											103
22	(Latvia) Roberts Lūsis	Gas Gas	36	33											93
23	(Slovenia) Jaka Peklaj	Husqvarna	5 (B)	6 (B)											71
24	(Slovenia) Žan Oven	Yamaha	8 (B)	13 (B)											61
25	(Italy) Tommaso Isdraele	Honda											23	Ret	58
26	(Latvia) Ralfs Vindigs	KTM	20 (B)	24 (B)											38
27	(Switzerland) Anthony Franc	KTM	Ret (B)	DNS (B)					16 (B)	Ret (B)					25
Fast Riders
1	(Italy) Francesco Bellei	KTM	3	9	Ret	DNS	8	4	5	18	4	10	3	9	1143
2	(Italy) Maurizio Scollo	Yamaha	11	26	11	12	13	8	2	11	39	15	8	34	979
3	(Italy) Mirko Valsecchi	Gas Gas	12	10	18	15	10	7	9	25	10	7	13	Ret	858
4	(Italy) Brando Rispoli	TM			6	4	Ret	12	8	6	6	9	14	29	841
5	(Italy) Andrea Roberti	KTM	34	24	14	10	16	18	24	9	13	17	22	14	790
6	(Italy) Alessandro Facca	KTM	15	27	27	20	20	15	11	15	17	14	17	15	777
7	(Italy) Morgan Bennati	Kawasaki	21	20	15	8	15	9	12	16	7	8	Ret	Ret	762
8	(Italy) Alfio Pulvirenti	KTM	25	36	13	7									709
8	(Italy) Alfio Pulvirenti	Yamaha					DNS (B)	DNS (B)							709
8	(Italy) Alfio Pulvirenti	Husqvarna							Ret	Ret	8	16	4	4	709
9	(Italy) Ramon Savioli	Kawasaki	27	21	12	19	14	14	29	10	19	Ret	16	26	705
10	(Italy) Davide Brandini	KTM	31	31	20	27	21	16	25	20	16	12	32	28	700
11	(Italy) Denny Bastianon	Honda	2 (B)	2 (B)	16	32	27	25	20	24	37	20	33	12	648
12	(Italy) Andrea Brilli	Husqvarna	29	29	3 (B)	9 (B)	26	28	15	23	33	30	1 (B)	2 (B)	586
13	(Italy) Luca Moro	KTM	30	23	28	22	6 (B)	4 (B)	26	28	31	33	2 (B)	1 (B)	578
14	(Italy) Luca Rosati	TM	9 (B)	4 (B)	24	28	4 (B)	2 (B)	22	13	29	21	Ret	22	557
15	(Italy) Vincenzo Giarrizzo	Honda	Ret	15	9	9	30	24	18	Ret	18	25			528
16	(Italy) Tommaso Sarasso	KTM	26	14	21	18	Ret (B)	3 (B)	DNS	DNS	23	22	29	25	511
17	(Italy) Pietro Dal Fitto	KTM	10 (B)	3 (B)	DNS (B)	DNS (B)	28	27	21	27	25	31	37	23	498
18	(Italy) Lorenzo Aglietti	KTM	35	32	Ret	DNS	22	30	27	Ret	22	35	21	18	487
19	(Italy) Mattia Nardo	Gas Gas	37	35	31	24	33	Ret	31	19	38	26			455
20	(Italy) Vincenzo Bove	KTM			29	23	25	23			26	13	28	36	449
21	(Italy) Paolo Martorano	KTM			1 (B)	2 (B)			1 (B)	1 (B)	27	28	19	32	377
22	(Italy) Alessandro Sadovschi	KTM			22	34	3 (B)	22 (B)			30	24	27	30	376
23	(Italy) Sebastiano Casamenti	Gas Gas	28 (B)	7 (B)	32	30	7 (B)	16 (B)	10	Ret			3 (B)	3 (B)	362
24	(Italy) Giacomo Bosi	Gas Gas	32 (B)	22 (B)	17 (B)	Ret (B)	15 (B)	8 (B)	5 (B)	3 (B)	1 (B)	4 (B)	31	31	362
25	(Italy) Nicola Salvini	KTM			10	14	12	13	17	Ret					360
26	(Italy) Patrick Busatto	KTM	24	30			24	17	28	DNS	11	Ret			359
27	(Italy) Riccardo Bindi	KTM					Ret	29	30	26	36	29	35	33	349
28	(Italy) Riccardo Oldani	Husqvarna	DNS (B)	31 (B)	2 (B)	3 (B)			2 (B)	10 (B)	5 (B)	1 (B)	24	35	336
29	(Italy) Nathan Mariani	Kawasaki			33	29	2 (B)	13 (B)	DNS	21	32	32			325
30	(Italy) Brando Polato	Gas Gas	15 (B)	20 (B)			12 (B)	6 (B)	6 (B)	7 (B)	3 (B)	2 (B)	9 (B)	9 (B)	321
31	(Italy) Tommaso Lodi	Kawasaki	19 (B)	15 (B)	14 (B)	DNS (B)	16 (B)	19 (B)	9 (B)	5 (B)	6 (B)	8 (B)	10 (B)	10 (B)	320
32	(Italy) Andrea Cipriani	KTM	12 (B)	1 (B)	26	21	23	21	DNS	Ret					302
33	(Italy) Raffaele Giuzio	KTM	19	25			18	22	23	Ret					298
34	(Italy) Francesco Ranieri	Honda	29 (B)	26 (B)	DNS (B)	DNS (B)	10 (B)	25 (B)	4 (B)	2 (B)	2 (B)	5 (B)	6 (B)	5 (B)	296
35	(Italy) Manolo D'Ettorre	Honda	31 (B)	30 (B)	12 (B)	11 (B)	24 (B)	20 (B)	15 (B)	6 (B)	11 (B)	12 (B)	12 (B)	14 (B)	294
36	(Italy) Giorgio Macri	Fantic	1 (B)	Ret (B)	DNS (B)	DNS (B)	11 (B)	23 (B)	3 (B)	Ret (B)	28	27	36	Ret	278
37	(Italy) Andrea Squizzato	Gas Gas	21 (B)	27 (B)	Ret (B)	DNS (B)	22 (B)	18 (B)	12 (B)	8 (B)	8 (B)	10 (B)	17 (B)	11 (B)	256
38	(Italy) Jacopo Pasqualotto	Husqvarna	16 (B)	21 (B)					10 (B)	9 (B)	4 (B)	3 (B)	8 (B)	7 (B)	250
39	(Italy) Mattia Barbieri	Fantic							DNS	DNS	20	19	18	20	247
40	(Italy) Edoardo Volpicelli	Husqvarna	28	28	25	25	DNS	DNS							218
41	(Italy) Jeremi Scandiani	Gas Gas	18 (B)	5 (B)	9 (B)	6 (B)	20 (B)	10 (B)	8 (B)	DNS (B)					211
42	(Italy) Niccolò Mannini	Yamaha											7	6	210
43	(Italy) Andrea Davoli	KTM	4 (B)	29 (B)			14 (B)	14 (B)					5 (B)	6 (B)	174
44	(Italy) Sebastiano Romano	Honda					23 (B)	21 (B)	7 (B)	Ret (B)	9 (B)	9 (B)	Ret (B)	4 (B)	173
45	(Italy) Emanuel Paglialunga	KTM	23 (B)	17 (B)	7 (B)	5 (B)	19 (B)	7 (B)							168
46	(Italy) Manuel Cavina	KTM	14 (B)	11 (B)	4 (B)	14 (B)	21 (B)	15 (B)							167
47	(Italy) Tommaso Cape	Husqvarna					29	31	Ret	17					166
48	(Italy) Federico Biserni	Honda			15 (B)	8 (B)	31	26							164
49	(Chile) César Paine	KTM	13 (B)	12 (B)	30	26									163
50	(Italy) Riccardo Cavina	KTM	26 (B)	28 (B)					11 (B)	Ret (B)	34	37			149
51	(Italy) Gabriele Bonifazio	Husqvarna	27 (B)	19 (B)	8 (B)	12 (B)	8 (B)	Ret (B)							131
52	(Italy) Giacomo Marchisio	Yamaha					9 (B)	11 (B)	13 (B)	4 (B)					127
53	(Italy) Alex Trento	Husqvarna											25	16	122
54	(Italy) Gennaro Utech	TM											26	17	119
55	(Italy) Eros Arico	Gas Gas					17 (B)	9 (B)					11 (B)	12 (B)	115
56	(Italy) Giorgio Orlando	Yamaha	33	16											114
57	(Italy) Alessandro Traversini	KTM			17	33									112
58	(Italy) Samuele Casadei	TM			Ret	31			17 (B)	DNS (B)	7 (B)	Ret (B)	Ret (B)	DNS (B)	108
59	(Italy) Devid Tozzi	Beta	24 (B)	25 (B)	6 (B)	7 (B)									102
60	(Italy) Riccardo Pini	Fantic											34	27	101
61	(Italy) Filippo Gervasio	Fantic	30 (B)	14 (B)	10 (B)	10 (B)									100
62	(Italy) Roberto Ciannavei	Husqvarna							14 (B)	Ret (B)	10 (B)	11 (B)			88
63	(Italy) Thomas Masciadri	Honda					18 (B)	17 (B)			Ret (B)	6 (B)			82
64	(Italy) Mattia Giampieri	Yamaha			5 (B)	1 (B)									76
65	(Italy) Andrea Boriani	Honda			11 (B)	4 (B)									67
66	(Italy) Matteo Borghi	Honda											7 (B)	8 (B)	67
67	(Italy) Pablo Zonta	Yamaha											4 (B)	13 (B)	65
68	(Italy) Gabriele Biffi	Husqvarna	Ret (B)	DNS (B)			5 (B)	12 (B)							65
69	(Italy) Cosimo Bellocci	Husqvarna					13 (B)	5 (B)							64
70	(Italy) Alessio Righetti	Honda	11 (B)	8 (B)											63
71	(Italy) Joele Faccio	Gas Gas	6 (B)	16 (B)											60
72	(Italy) Riccardo Marchini	KTM			16 (B)	13 (B)									53
73	(Italy) Samuele Ghetti	Husqvarna	7 (B)	23 (B)											52
74	(Italy) Davide Nardi	KTM	22 (B)	9 (B)											51
75	(Italy) Eugenio Barbaglia	Husqarna	DNS (B)	DNS (B)			34	DNS							47
76	(Italy) Giuseppe Zangari	Husqvarna	3 (B)	32 (B)											47
77	(Italy) Simone D'Agata	KTM	25 (B)	10 (B)											47
78	(Italy) Federico Marion	Honda	17 (B)	18 (B)											47
79	(Italy) Filippo Falsetti	KTM					25 (B)	24 (B)							33
80	(Italy) Tiziano Peverieri	Yamaha			13 (B)	DNS (B)									28
	(Italy) Gabriele Barbieri	Husqvarna							Ret	Ret					0
	(Italy) Mattia Roncaglia	Fantic					Ret	DNS							0
	(Italy) Valerio Mannaioli	Kawasaki									DNS (B)	DNS (B)			0
Pos	Rider	Bike	MAN (Lombardy)		CIN (Marche)		MON (Tuscany)		PAE (Tuscany)		CDL (Umbria)		PIE (Trentino-Alto Adige/Südtirol)		Points
