= 2020 European Motocross Championship =

The 2020 European Motocross Championship was the 32nd European Motocross Championship season since it was revived in 1988. It included 16 events and 6 different classes. It started at Matterley Basin in Great Britain on 1 March, and ended at Imola in Italy on 20 September. All rounds acted as support classes at the European rounds of the 2020 MXGP. In 2020, the EMX Open class formed part of the series for the first time.

== EMX250 ==
A 9-round calendar for the 2020 season was announced on 16 October 2019. EMX250 is for riders competing on 2-stroke and 4-stroke motorcycles between 175cc-250cc. Only riders under the age of 23 are allowed to compete.

=== Calendar ===
Completed EMX250 Grand Prix
Round	Date	Grand Prix	Location	Race 1 Winner	Race 2 Winner	Round Winner	Report
1	8 March	Netherlands	Valkenswaard	(Denmark) Bastian Bøgh Damm	(Denmark) Bastian Bøgh Damm	(Denmark) Bastian Bøgh Damm	
2	9 August	Latvia	Ķegums	(France) Thibault Benistant	(Italy) Mattia Guadagnini	(France) Thibault Benistant	
3	12 August	Riga	Ķegums	(France) Thibault Benistant	(France) Thibault Benistant	(France) Thibault Benistant	
4	16 August	Ķegums	Ķegums	(France) Thibault Benistant	(Italy) Mattia Guadagnini	(France) Thibault Benistant	
5	26 September	Lombardia	Mantua	(Norway) Håkon Fredriksen	(France) Thibault Benistant	(France) Thibault Benistant	
6	29 September	(Italy) Citta Di Mantova	Mantua	(Italy) Mattia Guadagnini	(Italy) Mattia Guadagnini	(Italy) Mattia Guadagnini	
7	3 October	(European Union) Europe	Mantua	(Italy) Mattia Guadagnini	(Italy) Mattia Guadagnini	(Italy) Mattia Guadagnini	
8	11 October	Spain	intu Xanadu	(Italy) Mattia Guadagnini	(Italy) Mattia Guadagnini	(Italy) Mattia Guadagnini	
9	18 October	Flanders	Lommel	(France) Thibault Benistant	(France) Thibault Benistant	(France) Thibault Benistant	
10	21 October	(Limburg (Belgium)) Limburg	Lommel	(Italy) Mattia Guadagnini	(France) Thibault Benistant	(France) Thibault Benistant	

EMX250 Grand Prix cancelled due to the COVID-19 pandemic
Original Date	Grand Prix	Location
5 April	Italy	Pietramurata
26 April	Portugal	Agueda
24 May	Germany	Teutschenthal
7 June	Russia	Orlyonok
2 August	Belgium	Lommel
16 August	Sweden	Uddevalla
23 August	Finland	Kymi Ring

=== Entry list ===
EMX250 entry list
Team	Constructor	No	Rider	Rounds
Husqvarna Junior Racing Maddii	Husqvarna	3	(Italy) Federico Tuani	5–7
Husqvarna Junior Racing Maddii	Husqvarna	7	(Germany) Maximilian Spies	1–6, 8–10
Husqvarna Junior Racing Maddii	Husqvarna	101	(Italy) Mattia Guadagnini	All
Husqvarna Junior Racing Maddii	Husqvarna	278	(Italy) Eugenio Barbaglia	5–7
KTM Sarholz Racing Team	KTM	4	(Austria) Marcel Stauffer	1
Kawasaki Team Green	Kawasaki	9	(United Kingdom) Lewis Hall	1
Jezyk Racing Team	KTM	10	(Spain) Oriol Oliver	1–3, 5–10
Jezyk Racing Team	KTM	88	(Spain) Sergi Notario	5–6
A1M Husqvarna	Husqvarna	12	(Estonia) Henry Vesilind	1
CreyMert Racing	KTM	13	(Switzerland) Maurice Chanton	1–4
Rockstar Energy Husqvarna Factory Racing Team	Husqvarna	14	(Netherlands) Kay de Wolf	All
Chambers Racing	Husqvarna	16	(United Kingdom) Tom Grimshaw	9–10
Team Steels Dr. Jack	KTM	18	(Italy) Leonardo Angeli	5–7
Yamaha Europe MJC	Yamaha	19	(Latvia) Mairis Pumpurs	2
Hutten Metaal Yamaha Racing Official EMX250 Team	Yamaha	22	(Italy) Gianluca Facchetti	All
Hutten Metaal Yamaha Racing Official EMX250 Team	Yamaha	198	(France) Thibault Benistant	All
Hutten Metaal Yamaha Racing Official EMX250 Team	Yamaha	484	(Netherlands) Dave Kooiker	10
Riley Racing	Yamaha	26	(Sweden) Tim Edberg	2–10
JK Racing Yamaha	Yamaha	27	(United Kingdom) Christopher Mills	1–7, 9–10
JK Racing Yamaha	Yamaha	192	(Denmark) Glen Meier	1–4
JK Racing Yamaha	Yamaha	371	(Italy) Manuel Iacopi	1
	Yamaha	29	(Norway) Sander Agard-Michelsen	1
Team Raths Motorsports	KTM	30	(Germany) Jakob Scheulen	1
Team Raths Motorsports	KTM	440	(Germany) Marnique Appelt	2–4, 9–10
Team Raths Motorsports	KTM	637	(Latvia) Tomass Šileika	2–7, 9–10
Mulders Motoren KTM	KTM	32	(Netherlands) Marcel Conijn	1–7, 9–10
Team AB Racing by Zweiradsport Schmitz	Husqvarna	36	(Germany) Nico Greutmann	1
Husqvarna Maurer GEP Racing	Husqvarna	38	(Hungary) Ádám Kovács	1–4
No Fear Jumbo BT Racing	Husqvarna	38	(Hungary) Adam Kovacs	5, 9
No Fear Jumbo BT Racing	Husqvarna	422	(South Africa) Camden McLellan	All
No Fear Jumbo BT Racing	Husqvarna	817	(Netherlands) Raf Meuwissen	1
BUD Racing Kawasaki	Kawasaki	39	(France) Quentin Prugnieres	5–6
BUD Racing Kawasaki	Kawasaki	183	(Venezuela) Lorenzo Locurcio	2–10
BUD Racing Kawasaki	Kawasaki	720	(France) Pierre Goupillon	1–3, 5–9
	KTM	40	(Estonia) Martin Michelis	2, 4, 10
Team VRT Nordpesca Holland	KTM	41	(France) Saad Soulimani	5–6
Team VRT Nordpesca Holland	KTM	268	(France) Thibault Maupin	1, 5–7
Team VRT Nordpesca Holland	KTM	270	(France) Tom Guyon	All
Team VRT Nordpesca Holland	KTM	696	(Switzerland) Mike Gwerder	2–5
137 Motorsport	KTM	42	(Finland) Kimi Koskinen	2–4
MGR Motocross Team	KTM	43	(Finland) Matias Vesterinen	1, 6–10
MGR Motocross Team	KTM	974	(Italy) Mario Tamai	1
Motor Centrum Eibergen	Husqvarna	44	(Netherlands) Rick Elzinga	1
TBS Conversions KTM Racing Team	KTM	44	(Netherlands) Rick Elzinga	5–6, 9–10
TBS Conversions KTM Racing Team	KTM	65	(Belgium) Wannes Van de Voorde	9–10
TBS Conversions KTM Racing Team	KTM	73	(Belgium) Romain Delbrassine	1, 9–10
TBS Conversions KTM Racing Team	KTM	214	(Netherlands) Kevin Simons	1
TBS Conversions KTM Racing Team	KTM	407	(Portugal) Afonso Gaidão	5–7, 9–10
TBS Conversions KTM Racing Team	KTM	772	(Belgium) Jarni Kooij	1, 5–6
F4E Racing Team	KTM	48	(United Kingdom) Adam Collings	1–2, 5–7, 9–10
F4E Racing Team	KTM	771	(Spain) Mario Lucas	1, 5–10
Maggiora Park Racing Team	KTM	50	(Italy) Paolo Lugana	5–7
Maggiora Park Racing Team	KTM	56	(Italy) Lorenzo Corti	1–7
	Husqvarna	51	(Belgium) Adrien Wagener	1–4, 9–10
Husqvarna Motorcycles Scandinavia	Husqvarna	52	(Sweden) Albin Gerhardsson	1, 5–7, 9–10
RT973 Racing Division	Suzuki	60	(Australia) Caleb Grothues	1–2
Yamaha Ausio Racing Team	Yamaha	67	(Spain) Yago Martinez	5–7
Yamaha Ausio Racing Team	Yamaha	784	(Spain) Eric Tomas	5–8
Sixty Two Motosport Husqvarna Team	Husqvarna	69	(Sweden) Filip Olsson	1–2
Team SE72 Yoko KTM	KTM	72	(Belgium) Liam Everts	1–4
Buitenhuis Racing	Yamaha	77	(Netherlands) Kevin Buitenhuis	1
Honda 114 Motorsports	Honda	78	(France) Axel Louis	All
	Husqvarna	79	(Switzerland) Cyril Zurbrügg	1
Yamaha SM Action - M.C. Migliori	Yamaha	80	(Italy) Andrea Adamo	1
Yamaha SM Action - M.C. Migliori	Yamaha	427	(Norway) Håkon Fredriksen	2–10
SKS Husqvarna Racing Team	Husqvarna	84	(Netherlands) Boyd van der Voorn	1
Brunetti Motors	KTM	86	(Italy) Matteo Del Coco	1–7
iXS MXGP Team	Yamaha	90	(Germany) Justin Trache	1
KTM Racing Center	KTM	96	(Belgium) Marnick Lagrou	1
Team VHR KTM Racing	KTM	100	(France) Scotty Verhaeghe	1
Team VHR KTM Racing	KTM	207	(France) Xavier Cazal	5–6
KTM Diga Junior Racing Team	KTM	107	(Sweden) Emil Jonrup	1–4, 9–10
KTM Diga Junior Racing Team	KTM	637	(Latvia) Tomass Šileika	1
Ghidinelli Racing s.s.d s.r.l	Yamaha	110	(Italy) Matteo Puccinelli	1–6
Ghidinelli Racing s.s.d s.r.l	Yamaha	223	(Italy) Giuseppe Tropepe	1
	KTM	112	(Switzerland) Xylian Ramella	6–7
Honda Racing Assomotor	Honda	125	(Finland) Emil Weckman	5, 7, 9–10
Honda Racing Assomotor	Honda	200	(Switzerland) Luca Diserens	1
Sõmerpalu MK	KTM	132	(Estonia) Karel Kutsar	1
Husqvarna MCR Racing Team	Husqvarna	137	(Italy) Yuri Quarti	2–5
	KTM	141	(Netherlands) Dani Hoitink	1
	KTM	144	(Latvia) Kristiāns Freimanis	2–4
Maritza Racing Team	KTM	164	(Bulgaria) Nikolay Malinov	2–4
BvZ Racing Team	KTM	171	(Germany) Fynn-Niklas Tornau	9–10
	Husqvarna	176	(France) Jean-Loup Lepan	1
	Husqvarna	180	(Sweden) Leopold Ambjörnsson	1–3
Anquety Motorsport	Husqvarna	181	(Belgium) Julian Vander Auwera	1
JC184 Racing Team	Husqvarna	184	(United Kingdom) James Carpenter	9–10
	Husqvarna	191	(Lithuania) Erlandas Mackonis	2–4
DJR Andre Motors	KTM	195	(Netherlands) Davey Nieuwenhuizen	1
LEF Racing Team	Suzuki	199	(Belgium) Florent Lambillon	9–10
S11 Motorsport	Husqvarna	209	(Italy) Gianmarco Cenerelli	2–6, 9–10
Hitachi KTM fuelled by Milwaukee	KTM	217	(United Kingdom) Eddie Wade	2
SDM Corse Yamaha Racing	Yamaha	220	(Italy) Raffaele Giuzio	2–6, 8
Celestini Racing KTM	KTM	228	(Italy) Emilio Scuteri	1, 5–7
MX Academy Suzuki Sverige	Suzuki	238	(Sweden) Viktor Andersson	9
WZ Racing	KTM	239	(Germany) Lion Florian	1–6, 9–10
WZ Racing	KTM	403	(Denmark) Bastian Bøgh Damm	1–7, 9–10
KTM Youth MX Team	KTM	242	(Netherlands) Kjell Verbruggen	5–6
Tech32 Racing MX Team	KTM	249	(France) Mathéo Miot	1
Wozniak Racing	Yamaha	255	(Denmark) Magnus Smith	5–6, 9–10
SHR Motorsports	Yamaha	260	(Germany) Nico Koch	1, 5–6
ASA United Husqvarna	Husqvarna	261	(Estonia) Jörgen-Matthias Talviku	All
NR83	KTM	271	(Czech Republic) Stanislav Vasicek	9–10
Team Tolmoto	Husqvarna	292	(Spain) Alex Gamboa	8
KTM Team Theiner	KTM	300	(Germany) Noah Ludwig	1
Absolut MX Kawasaki Sverige Team Green	Kawasaki	354	(Sweden) Viking Lindström	1
RHR Yamaha Racing	Yamaha	365	(United Kingdom) Sam Nunn	1
Nilsson Training Yamaha Bermudez	Yamaha	368	(Spain) Samuel Nilsson	1, 5–8
Gouwenberg B.V.	Husqvarna	392	(Netherlands) Koen Gouwenberg	2–4
Team Brouwer Motors	KTM	411	(Netherlands) Kjeld Stuurman	1–4, 9–10
Team Brouwer Motors	KTM	629	(Netherlands) Twan Wagenaar	1–4
NDMX	KTM	432	(Sweden) Elix Ruth	1
	KTM	440	(Germany) Marnique Appelt	1
Marchetti Racing Team KTM	KTM	474	(Netherlands) Twan van Essen	All
Motor2000 KTM	KTM	489	(Netherlands) Jens Walvoort	6–7, 9–10
Motor2000 KTM	KTM	601	(United Kingdom) Kelton Gwyther	6–7, 9–10
Motorrad Waldmann	Honda	491	(Germany) Paul Haberland	1
Team KTM Scandinavia	KTM	505	(Sweden) Arvid Lüning	9–10
Team KTM Scandinavia	KTM	517	(Sweden) Isak Gifting	1–4
Speedequipment Racing Sports	KTM	521	(Sweden) Edvin Hagman	1
	KTM	537	(Netherlands) Damian Wedage	1, 9–10
	KTM	563	(Belgium) Wesly Dieudonne	2–7
	Husqvarna	592	(Sweden) Axel Gustafsson	1
Martin Racing Technology	Honda	644	(Italy) Ismaele Guarise	5–7
	KTM	651	(Estonia) Meico Vettik	2–6
	KTM	717	(Belgium) Greg Demeulemeester	1
	KTM	730	(Russia) Timur Petrashin	1
	Husqvarna	733	(Estonia) Kaarel Tilk	2–4
	Husqvarna	757	(Latvia) Rainers Žuks	2–4
KD Donckers MX Team	Kawasaki	801	(Belgium) Jordi Van Mieghem	5–7, 9–10
E2T Racing Team	Husqvarna	810	(France) Yann Crnjanski	1
Motos Arribas Racing Team	Husqvarna	812	(Spain) Angel Arribas	5–8
Lakerveld Racing	KTM	822	(Netherlands) Mike Bolink	1
	KTM	911	(Netherlands) Henk Pater	1
PAR Homes RFX Husqvarna	Husqvarna	912	(United Kingdom) Joel Rizzi	2–6
	Husqvarna	921	(Sweden) Jesper Gangfors	1
CBO Group	Husqvarna	945	(France) Anthony Bourdon	9–10
Pablo MX Team	Husqvarna	981	(Belgium) Tim Louis	1

=== Riders Championship ===
EMX250 riders championship
Pos	Rider	Bike	NED (Netherlands)		LAT (Latvia)		RIG		KEG		LOM		CDM (Italy)		EUR (European Union)		ESP (Spain)		FLA (Flanders)		LIM (Limburg (Belgium))		Points
1	(France) Thibault Benistant	Yamaha	11	2	1	2	1	1	1	3	5	1	2	7	8	2	3	3	1	1	2	1	423
2	(Italy) Mattia Guadagnini	Husqvarna	12	4	5	1	4	14	4	1	2	Ret	1	1	1	1	1	1	2	2	1	Ret	377
3	(Norway) Håkon Fredriksen	Yamaha			8	Ret	10	3	6	8	1	8	3	2	3	5	8	7	3	4	4	2	293
4	(Netherlands) Kay de Wolf	Husqvarna	4	11	7	5	14	4	2	2	12	2	9	10	16	9	2	5	5	3	DNS	DNS	272
5	(Estonia) Jörgen-Matthias Talviku	Husqvarna	3	18	4	3	19	7	9	21	8	11	7	4	4	4	7	14	4	5	3	7	269
6	(Sweden) Tim Edberg	Yamaha			3	8	9	5	3	11	6	3	8	8	9	11	5	10	Ret	10	Ret	3	232
7	(Venezuela) Lorenzo Locurcio	Kawasaki			12	11	5	30	8	19	9	5	5	3	14	3	6	2	12	15	14	10	211
8	(France) Tom Guyon	KTM	19	12	11	6	2	Ret	Ret	DNS	Ret	4	4	9	5	6	10	12	17	9	Ret	16	178
9	(Denmark) Bastian Bøgh Damm	KTM	1	1	32	Ret	Ret	8	Ret	5	Ret	Ret	17	13	15	8			6	13	12	4	160
10	(Italy) Gianluca Facchetti	Yamaha	6	31	19	7	Ret	12	Ret	Ret	3	7	22	11	Ret	7	4	4	Ret	Ret	6	13	157
11	(Netherlands) Marcel Conijn	KTM	13	8	24	13	Ret	16	19	15	22	19	11	14	2	10			7	6	5	5	155
12	(Estonia) Meico Vettik	KTM			6	26	3	6	5	4	4	9	14	5									137
13	(Germany) Maximilian Spies	Husqvarna	DNQ	DNQ	20	10	6	9	17	10	17	6	10	Ret			11	9	21	16	13	9	131
14	(Sweden) Isak Gifting	KTM	2	9	2	4	12	2	10	9													128
15	(Germany) Lion Florian	KTM	5	7	10	Ret	15	Ret	7	14	11	12	Ret	15					16	14	8	11	128
16	(Spain) Oriol Oliver	KTM	29	22	31	9	DNS	DNS			7	18	6	Ret	Ret	16	9	6	11	7	10	12	120
17	(South Africa) Camden McLellan	Husqvarna	30	20	21	12	8	22	DSQ	6	15	30	13	12	12	19	12	13	14	11	11	Ret	116
18	(Latvia) Tomass Šileika	KTM	Ret	10	13	14	13	10	14	Ret	16	16	15	18	11	Ret			18	20	18	14	95
19	(Belgium) Liam Everts	KTM	7	6	16	16	7	11	11	7													87
20	(Sweden) Albin Gerhardsson	KTM	DNQ	DNQ							26	17	12	19	Ret	14			9	12	7	6	72
21	(France) Pierre Goupillon	Kawasaki	20	Ret	Ret	Ret	Ret	DNS			19	13	16	6	6	Ret	20	11	10	Ret			68
22	(Denmark) Glen Meier	Yamaha	10	13	14	15	21	13	15	13													54
23	(Netherlands) Twan Van Essen	KTM	DNQ	DNQ	25	20	16	Ret	21	24	DNQ	DNQ	23	Ret	19	18	13	17	13	18	17	15	44
24	(Netherlands) Rick Elzinga	KTM	23	34							14	23	Ret	Ret					8	17	Ret	8	37
25	(United Kingdom) Joel Rizzi	Husqvarna			18	17	11	18	13	12	21	25	Ret	21									37
26	(Italy) Andrea Adamo	Yamaha	8	3																			33
27	(Switzerland) Mike Gwerder	KTM			17	19	17	15	12	31	13	Ret											33
28	(Estonia) Karel Kutsar	KTM	9	5																			28
29	(Finland) Emil Weckman	Honda									DNQ	DNQ			7	Ret			Ret	8	Ret	DNS	27
30	(Italy) Paolo Lugana	KTM									18	14	19	16	13	Ret							25
31	(Finland) Matias Vesterinen	KTM	27	30									21	17	17	Ret	15	15	Ret	31	16	Ret	25
32	(Italy) Lorenzo Corti	KTM	DNQ	DNQ	23	25	Ret	17	Ret	Ret	DNQ	DNQ	25	22	10	12							24
33	(France) Axel Louis	Honda	DNQ	DNQ	DNQ	DNQ	29	28	Ret	27	Ret	26	DNQ	DNQ	18	21	14	8	Ret	32	30	25	23
34	(Spain) Mario Lucas	KTM	37	37							33	Ret	Ret	24	25	15	18	16	26	22	15	20	21
35	(France) Anthony Bourdon	Husqvarna																	15	37	9	Ret	18
36	(Italy) Emilio Scuteri	KTM	18	Ret							10	Ret	18	25	DNS	Ret							17
37	(Sweden) Filip Olsson	Husqvarna	17	26	9	Ret																	16
38	(Italy) Gianmarco Cenerelli	Husqvarna			33	Ret	Ret	DNS	16	Ret	Ret	10	DNQ	DNQ					31	38	32	31	16
39	(Netherlands) Raf Meuwissen	Husqvarna	14	15																			13
40	(Italy) Raffaele Giuzio	Yamaha			26	18	18	27	23	Ret	32	21	20	Ret			19	18					12
41	(Hungary) Adam Kovacs	Husqvarna	16	Ret	Ret	Ret	Ret	Ret	Ret	16	DNS	DNS							Ret	30			10
42	(Italy) Federico Tuani	Husqvarna									25	22	24	20	24	13							9
43	(Norway) Sander Agard-Michelsen	Yamaha	32	14																			7
44	(Denmark) Magnus Smith	Yamaha									20	15	Ret	DNS					Ret	DNS	22	23	7
45	(Spain) Eric Tomas	Yamaha									DNQ	DNQ	DNQ	DNQ	Ret	30	16	19					7
46	(Russia) Timur Petrashin	KTM	15	21																			6
47	(Latvia) Mairis Pumpurs	Yamaha			15	22																	6
48	(Austria) Marcel Stauffer	KTM	28	16																			5
49	(Italy) Matteo Del Coco	KTM	21	32	30	28	22	23	30	32	24	28	30	Ret	20	17							5
50	(Italy) Matteo Puccinelli	Yamaha	DNQ	DNQ	Ret	30	20	21	Ret	17	31	Ret	Ret	DNS									5
51	(Spain) Alex Gamboa	Husqvarna															17	20					5
52	(Finland) Kimi Koskinen	KTM			22	Ret	Ret	19	18	22													5
53	(United Kingdom) Adam Collings	KTM	DNQ	DNQ	DNQ	DNQ					DNQ	DNQ	DNQ	DNQ	29	24			23	23	26	17	4
54	(Italy) Giuseppe Tropepe	Yamaha	Ret	17																			4
55	(Netherlands) Kjeld Stuurman	KTM	31	29	DNQ	DNQ	24	Ret	24	20									20	25	19	Ret	4
56	(Estonia) Martin Michelis	KTM			28	27			22	18											28	28	3
57	(Sweden) Arvid Lüning	KTM																	27	29	23	18	3
58	(United Kingdom) James Carpenter	Husqvarna																	Ret	21	20	19	3
59	(Germany) Marnique Appelt	KTM	25	23	29	23	31	20	Ret	DNS									28	19	29	22	3
60	(Netherlands) Jens Walvoort	KTM											31	29	30	27			19	33	25	30	2
61	(Italy) Manuel Iacopi	Yamaha	26	19																			2
62	(Spain) Yago Martinez	Yamaha									Ret	20	Ret	23	21	20							2
63	(Italy) Yuri Quarti	Husqvarna			Ret	Ret	26	Ret	20	23	23	Ret											1
	(Sweden) Emil Jonrup	KTM	35	24	Ret	24	23	26	DNQ	DNQ									29	27	21	26	0
	(United Kingdom) Tom Grimshaw	Husqvarna																	24	28	24	21	0
	(Latvia) Rainers Žuks	Husqvarna			27	21	27	24	28	25													0
	(Sweden) Viking Lindström	Kawasaki	22	25																			0
	(United Kingdom) Christopher Mills	Yamaha	DNQ	DNQ	DNQ	DNQ	DNQ	DNQ	26	Ret	DNQ	DNQ	DNQ	DNQ	31	26			22	26	Ret	Ret	0
	(Italy) Leonardo Angeli	KTM									35	27	DNQ	DNQ	22	Ret							0
	(Belgium) Jordi Van Mieghem	Kawasaki									DNQ	DNQ	DNQ	DNQ	Ret	22			Ret	35	Ret	27	0
	(Italy) Ismaele Guarise	Honda									30	29	28	26	28	23							0
	(France) Thibault Maupin	KTM	DNQ	DNQ							DNQ	DNQ	DNQ	31	23	Ret							0
	(Netherlands) Damian Wedage	KTM	DNQ	DNQ															25	24	27	24	0
	(Spain) Samuel Nilsson	Yamaha	DNQ	DNQ							34	24	26	27	Ret	Ret	Ret	DNS					0
	(Germany) Nico Koch	Yamaha	24	33							28	Ret	27	Ret									0
	(Bulgaria) Nikolay Malinov	KTM			DNQ	DNQ	25	25	DNQ	DNQ													0
	(Belgium) Wesly Dieudonne	KTM			DNQ	DNQ	DNQ	DNQ	DNQ	DNQ	DNQ	DNQ	DNQ	DNQ	26	25							0
	(Estonia) Kaarel Tilk	Husqvarna			DNQ	DNQ	32	Ret	25	Ret													0
	(Netherlands) Koen Gouwenberg	Husqvarna			Ret	29	30	29	Ret	26													0
	(Spain) Sergi Notario	KTM									27	Ret	29	28									0
	(Netherlands) Twan Wagenaar	KTM	DNQ	DNQ	DNQ	DNQ	DNQ	DNQ	27	28													0
	(Italy) Eugenio Barbaglia	Husqvarna									DNQ	DNQ	Ret	Ret	27	29							0
	(Sweden) Axel Gustafsson	Husqvarna	36	27																			0
	(Spain) Angel Arribas	Husqvarna									DNQ	DNQ	DNQ	DNQ	32	28	DNS	DNS					0
	(Belgium) Jarni Kooij	KTM	34	28							DNQ	DNQ	DNQ	DNQ									0
	(Switzerland) Maurice Chanton	KTM	DNQ	DNQ	Ret	Ret	28	Ret	DNS	DNS													0
	(Lithuania) Erlandas Mackonis	Husqvarna			DNQ	DNQ	DNQ	DNQ	29	29													0
	(Germany) Fynn-Niklas Tornau	KTM																	DNQ	36	31	29	0
	(Netherlands) Kjell Verbruggen	KTM									29	Ret	Ret	DNS									0
	(Belgium) Romain Delbrassinne	KTM	DNQ	DNQ															30	34	33	33	0
	(Switzerland) Xylian Ramella	KTM											DNQ	30	33	DNS							0
	(Latvia) Kristiāns Freimanis	KTM			DNQ	DNQ	DNQ	DNQ	DNQ	30													0
	(Portugal) Afonso Gaidão	KTM									DNQ	DNQ	DNQ	DNQ	Ret	31			DNQ	DNQ	DNQ	DNQ	0
	(Sweden) Leopold Ambjörnsson	Husqvarna	DNQ	DNQ	DNQ	DNQ	DNQ	31															0
	(Belgium) Wannes Van de Voorde	KTM																	DNQ	DNQ	DNQ	32	0
	(Estonia) Henry Vesilind	Husqvarna	33	36																			0
	(France) Mathéo Miot	KTM	Ret	35																			0
	(Netherlands) Dave Kooiker	Yamaha																			Ret	DNS	0
	(Belgium) Adrien Wagener	Husqvarna	DNQ	DNQ	DNQ	DNQ	DNQ	DNQ	DNQ	DNQ									DNQ	DNQ	DNQ	DNQ	0
	(United Kingdom) Kelton Gwyther	KTM											DNQ	DNQ	DNQ	DNQ			DNQ	DNQ	DNQ	DNQ	0
	(Australia) Caleb Grothues	Suzuki	DNQ	DNQ	DNQ	DNQ																	0
	(France) Quentin Prugnieres	Kawasaki									DNQ	DNQ	DNQ	DNQ									0
	(France) Saad Soulimani	KTM									DNQ	DNQ	DNQ	DNQ									0
	(France) Xavier Cazal	KTM									DNQ	DNQ	DNQ	DNQ									0
	(Belgium) Florent Lambillon	Suzuki																	DNQ	DNQ	DNQ	DNQ	0
	(Czech Republic) Stanislav Vasicek	KTM																	DNQ	DNQ	DNQ	DNQ	0
	(Netherlands) Mike Bolink	KTM	DNQ	DNQ																			0
	(France) Scotty Verhaeghe	KTM	DNQ	DNQ																			0
	(Sweden) Edvin Hagman	KTM	DNQ	DNQ																			0
	(Germany) Nico Greutmann	Husqvarna	DNQ	DNQ																			0
	(United Kingdom) Sam Nunn	Yamaha	DNQ	DNQ																			0
	(Sweden) Jesper Gangfors	Husqvarna	DNQ	DNQ																			0
	(France) Yann Crnjanski	Husqvarna	DNQ	DNQ																			0
	(Germany) Noah Ludwig	KTM	DNQ	DNQ																			0
	(Sweden) Elix Ruth	KTM	DNQ	DNQ																			0
	(Netherlands) Davey Nieuwenhuizen	KTM	DNQ	DNQ																			0
	(France) Jean Loup Lepan	Husqvarna	DNQ	DNQ																			0
	(Belgium) Greg Demeulemeester	KTM	DNQ	DNQ																			0
	(Netherlands) Henk Pater	KTM	DNQ	DNQ																			0
	(Netherlands) Boyd van der Voorn	Husqvarna	DNQ	DNQ																			0
	(Germany) Paul Haberland	Honda	DNQ	DNQ																			0
	(United Kingdom) Lewis Hall	Kawasaki	DNQ	DNQ																			0
	(Belgium) Tim Louis	Husqvarna	DNQ	DNQ																			0
	(Italy) Mario Tamai	KTM	DNQ	DNQ																			0
	(Belgium) Marnick Lagrou	KTM	DNQ	DNQ																			0
	(Switzerland) Luca Diserens	Honda	DNQ	DNQ																			0
	(Germany) Jakob Scheulen	KTM	DNQ	DNQ																			0
	(Germany) Justin Trache	Yamaha	DNQ	DNQ																			0
	(Belgium) Julian Vander Auwera	KTM	DNQ	DNQ																			0
	(Netherlands) Kevin Simons	KTM	DNQ	DNQ																			0
	(Netherlands) Dani Hoitink	KTM	DNQ	DNQ																			0
	(Netherlands) Kevin Buitenhuis	Yamaha	DNQ	DNQ																			0
	(Switzerland) Cyril Zurbrügg	Husqvarna	DNQ	DNQ																			0
	(United Kingdom) Eddie Wade	KTM			DNQ	DNQ																	0
	(Sweden) Viktor Andersson	Suzuki																	DNQ	DNQ			0
Pos	Rider	Bike	NED (Netherlands)		LAT (Latvia)		RIG		KEG		LOM		CDM (Italy)		EUR (European Union)		ESP (Spain)		FLA (Flanders)		LIM (Limburg (Belgium))		Points

=== Manufacturers Championship ===
EMX250 manufacturers championship
Pos	Bike	NED (Netherlands)		LAT (Latvia)		RIG		KEG		LOM		CDM (Italy)		EUR (European Union)		ESP (Spain)		FLA (Flanders)		LIM (Limburg (Belgium))		Points
1	Yamaha	6	2	1	2	1	1	1	3	1	1	2	2	3	2	3	3	1	1	2	1	452
2	Husqvarna	3	4	4	1	4	4	2	1	2	2	1	1	1	1	1	1	2	2	1	6	442
3	KTM	1	1	2	4	2	2	5	4	4	4	4	5	2	6	9	6	6	6	5	4	366
4	Kawasaki	20	25	12	11	5	30	8	19	9	5	5	3	6	3	6	2	10	15	14	10	222
5	Honda	DNQ	DNQ	DNQ	DNQ	29	28	Ret	27	30	29	28	26	7	21	14	8	Ret	8	30	25	47
	Suzuki	DNQ	DNQ	DNQ	DNQ													DNQ	DNQ	DNQ	DNQ	0
Pos	Bike	NED (Netherlands)		LAT (Latvia)		RIG		KEG		LOM		CDM (Italy)		EUR (European Union)		ESP (Spain)		FLA (Flanders)		LIM (Limburg (Belgium))		Points

== EMX125 ==
A 9-round calendar for the 2020 season was announced on 16 October 2019. EMX125 is for riders competing on 2-stroke motorcycles of 125cc.

=== Calendar ===
EMX125 Grand Prix completed
Round	Date	Grand Prix	Location	Race 1 Winner	Race 2 Winner	Round Winner	Report
1	1 March	Great Britain	Matterley Basin	(Belgium) Liam Everts	(Belgium) Liam Everts	(Belgium) Liam Everts	
2	6 September	Italy	Faenza	(Italy) Andrea Bonacorsi	(Italy) Andrea Bonacorsi	(Italy) Andrea Bonacorsi	
3	9 September	(Italy) Citta di Faenza	Faenza	(Italy) Andrea Bonacorsi	(Italy) Andrea Bonacorsi	(Italy) Andrea Bonacorsi	
4	13 September	Emilia-Romagna	Faenza	(Italy) Andrea Bonacorsi	(Italy) Andrea Bonacorsi	(Italy) Andrea Bonacorsi	
5	3 October	(European Union) Europe	Mantua	(Estonia) Meico Vettik	(Italy) Valerio Lata	(Italy) Valerio Lata	
6	11 October	Spain	intu Xanadu	(Estonia) Meico Vettik	(Italy) Andrea Roncoli	(Italy) Andrea Bonacorsi	
7	18 October	Flanders	Lommel	(Spain) David Braceras	(Spain) Guillem Farrés	(Spain) Guillem Farrés	
8	21 October	(Limburg (Belgium)) Limburg	Lommel	(Italy) Andrea Bonacorsi	(Spain) David Braceras	(Spain) David Braceras	
9	25 October	Lommel	Lommel	(Sweden) Max Pålsson	(Sweden) Max Pålsson	(Sweden) Max Pålsson	

EMX125 Grand Prix cancelled due to the COVID-19 pandemic
Original Date	Grand Prix	Location
26 April	Portugal	Agueda
10 May	France	St Jean d'Angely
2 August	Belgium	Lommel
16 August	Sweden	Uddevalla
23 August	Finland	Kymi Ring

=== Entry list ===
EMX125 entry list
Team	Constructor	No	Rider	Rounds
Marchetti Racing Team KTM	KTM	3	(Italy) Valerio Lata	All
RFME Gas Gas MX Junior Team	Gas Gas	4	(Spain) Gerard Congost	2–7
RFME Gas Gas MX Junior Team	Gas Gas	24	(Spain) David Braceras	All
RFME Gas Gas MX Junior Team	Gas Gas	309	(Spain) Guillem Farrés	All
RFME Gas Gas MX Junior Team	Gas Gas	315	(Spain) David Beltran	1
	Yamaha	7	(Belgium) Hugo Richard	9
	KTM	8	(Italy) Andrea Viano	5
CI Sport	KTM	10	(United Kingdom) Harvey Cashmore	1, 7–9
Red Bull KTM Factory Racing	KTM	11	(United States) Max Vohland	1
CreyMert Racing	KTM	12	(Norway) Håkon Østerhagen	All
Mefo Sport	Husqvarna	15	(Estonia) Romeo Karu	1, 7–9
	TM	16	(Italy) Alberto Brida	2–4
Deschacht-Ballini Team	Husqvarna	17	(Belgium) Junior Bal	1–4, 7–9
Yamaha Europe EMX125 MJC	Yamaha	19	(Latvia) Mairis Pumpurs	1–2
Yamaha Europe EMX125 MJC	Yamaha	33	(Netherlands) Kay Karssemakers	5–9
Yamaha Europe EMX125 MJC	Yamaha	432	(Netherlands) Ivano Van Erp	All
	Husqvarna	27	(Belgium) Lucas Roulet	1
Fantic Racing Team	Fantic	32	(Italy) Andrea Bonacorsi	All
	KTM	35	(Netherlands) Boaz Bijtjes	7–9
	KTM	40	(Estonia) Martin Michelis	1
A1M Husqvarna	Husqvarna	42	(Finland) Sampo Rainio	1, 7–9
Moto Kurzeme	KTM	43	(Latvia) Roberts Lūsis	7–9
Team VRT Nordpesca Holland	KTM	44	(France) Saad Soulimani	All
Team Dragon Moto	KTM	47	(Israel) Suff Sella	1, 3–5
KTM Kosak Racing	KTM	70	(Germany) Valentin Kees	1–2
KTM Kosak Racing	KTM	532	(Germany) Constantin Piller	1–4
Team SE72 Yoko KTM	KTM	72	(Belgium) Liam Everts	1–2
	Husqvarna	75	(Italy) Matteo De Sanctis	5
	KTM	79	(Russia) Artemy Rausov	2–5, 7–9
	KTM	82	(Russia) Ilya Pavliv	6
Hitachi KTM fuelled by Milwaukee	KTM	83	(United Kingdom) Ethan Lane	6–9
Hitachi KTM fuelled by Milwaukee	KTM	217	(United Kingdom) Eddie Wade	1
	KTM	88	(Belgium) Lennert Verhoeven	1, 7–9
Apex KTM	KTM	89	(United Kingdom) Jacob Randall	1, 7
CJT Racing KTM	KTM	93	(Belgium) Lucas Coenen	1
Team Yamaha Ausio	Yamaha	96	(Spain) Victor Alonso	2–9
Team Yamaha Ausio	Yamaha	252	(Spain) Raul Sanchez	All
FXR Europe	Husqvarna	101	(United Kingdom) Jude Morris	1
Oragno114 Husqvarna Racing	Husqvarna	115	(Italy) Andrea Roncoli	All
Oragno114 Husqvarna Racing	Husqvarna	129	(Italy) Niccolo Maggiora	1–2, 7–8
Team JCR	Yamaha	116	(Spain) Gonzalo Vargas	6
Motoport Den Bosch	Husqvarna	124	(Netherlands) Didier van Kasteren	7–9
Passion Racing powered by Midwest Husqvarna	Husqvarna	128	(United Kingdom) Charlie Palmer	1
WZ-Racing	KTM	131	(Germany) Cato Nickel	1–4
WZ-Racing	KTM	568	(Sweden) Max Pålsson	All
WZ-Racing	KTM	572	(Denmark) Rasmus Pedersen	1–2, 7–9
	KTM	138	(Netherlands) Bryan Nelis	7–9
Manchester MC	Husqvarna	171	(United Kingdom) Arai Elcock	1
TBS Conversions KTM	KTM	172	(Netherlands) Cas Valk	2–5, 7–9
TBS Conversions KTM	KTM	509	(Belgium) Yoran Moens	1–2, 5, 7
TBS Conversions KTM	KTM	651	(Estonia) Meico Vettik	8–9
Team VHR KTM Racing	KTM	207	(France) Xavier Cazal	1–5, 7–9
	KTM	212	(Italy) Davide Zampino	2–9
KTM Dermotor	KTM	223	(Spain) Diego Torrijo	1, 6
	Yamaha	240	(Belgium) Sam Jordant	7–9
737 Performance Team	Husqvarna	241	(France) Nicolas Duhamel	2–5, 7–9
ProGrip Racing/MX-United	KTM	242	(Russia) Nikita Kucherov	1–5, 7–9
Globe powered by Diga Racing	KTM	247	(France) Florian Miot	1–4, 7–9
Nilsson Training	KTM	249	(Spain) Alejandro Tertre	6, 8–9
iXS MXGP Team	Yamaha	253	(Switzerland) Kevin Brumann	1–5
	Yamaha	255	(France) Mathis Barthez	5–6
Wozniak Racing	Yamaha	256	(Denmark) Magnus Smith	1
Tech32 Racing	KTM	282	(France) Marc-Antoine Rossi	5
	KTM	284	(France) Leo Lefaure	1
KTM Racestore MX2	KTM	304	(Italy) Tiberio Mazzantini	1–2
Teamx Reina	KTM	315	(Spain) David Beltran	6
Bud Racing Kawasaki	KTM	319	(France) Quentin Prugnieres	All
AGM 814 Army	KTM	323	(Spain) Daniel Carcaboso	6, 8–9
Yamaha MX Junior Team	Yamaha	330	(Italy) Daniel Gimm	1–6, 8–9
Team Castellari	Husqvarna	344	(Italy) Pietro Razzini	All
Tech32Racing MX	KTM	359	(France) Maxime Grau	1
Jezyk Racing Team	KTM	373	(Spain) Edgar Canet	1–4, 6–9
Team Judd Racing MX	KTM	377	(United Kingdom) Preston Williams	1
Team Judd Racing MX	KTM	711	(United Kingdom) Louie Kessell	1
	KTM	394	(France) Johan Bourdieu	6
NR83	KTM	437	(Czech Republic) Martin Venhoda	1–4, 6–9
No Fear Jumbo BT Racing Team	Husqvarna	408	(Netherlands) Scott Smulders	1–5, 7–9
No Fear Jumbo BT Racing Team	Husqvarna	422	(South Africa) Camden McLellan	1
Falcon Motorsports	KTM	410	(Germany) Max Thunecke	1
Atxuri MX-Aginaga Sport	KTM	411	(Spain) Gilen Albisua	1
	KTM	417	(United Kingdom) Vinnie Guthrie	1
	KTM	420	(Italy) Andrea Rossi	2–5
Harry Nolte Racing	KTM	442	(Netherlands) Kjell Verbruggen	1
GRT Holeshot KTM	KTM	456	(United Kingdom) Ollie Colmer	7–9
F4E Racing Team	KTM	463	(Belgium) Baptiste Beernaert	7, 9
	Yamaha	472	(United Kingdom) Luke Hull	1
F&H Racing Shop	Husqvarna	475	(Netherlands) Bradley Mesters	9
Team Motopalvelu	KTM	480	(Finland) Kasimir Hindersson	7–9
Heinen Racing Team	KTM	481	(Luxembourg) Jamie Heinen	7, 9
Hutten Metaal Yamaha Racing	Yamaha	484	(Netherlands) Dave Kooiker	2–3, 7
Motor2000 KTM	KTM	489	(Netherlands) Jens Walvoort	1
	KTM	500	(Germany) Noel Schmitt	1
JD Gunnex KTM Racing Team	KTM	535	(Czech Republic) Radek Vetrovsky	1, 7, 9
ASA United Husqvarna	Husqvarna	579	(United Kingdom) Bobby Bruce	1, 5
KTM Pole Moto Passion Perpignan	KTM	589	(France) Kiliann Poll	5–6
R2A Junior Team	KTM	597	(France) Alan Harnois	1
R2A Junior Team	KTM	606	(France) Killian Vincent	1
Team EMX Racing	KTM	602	(Sweden) Felix Boberg	1, 7–9
	KTM	651	(Estonia) Meico Vettik	1–7
	Yamaha	657	(France) Alexis Fueri	2–4
	KTM	669	(Italy) Luca Ruffini	5
Vitols RT Metals	Husqvarna	684	(Latvia) Uldis Freibergs	7–9
Husqvarna Junior Racing Maddii	Husqvarna	696	(Italy) Ferruccio Zanchi	5
Motozip Yamaha	Yamaha	724	(Latvia) Jānis Kubuliņš	7–9
	KTM	731	(United Kingdom) Alfie Jones	1
KTM Diga Junior Racing	KTM	741	(Belarus) Daniel Volovich	1–5, 7–9
Hamstra Racing	KTM	772	(Latvia) Kārlis Reišulis	1, 5, 7–9
Team Bauerschmidt MB33	KTM	838	(Denmark) William Kleemann	1–4, 7–9
Pardi Racing Team	KTM	881	(Italy) Matteo Russi	2–4
PAR Homes RFX Husqvarna	Husqvarna	912	(United Kingdom) Joel Rizzi	1
	KTM	938	(Brazil) Rodolfo Bicalho	2–5

=== Riders Championship ===
EMX125 riders championship
Pos	Rider	Bike	GBR (United Kingdom)		ITA (Italy)		CDF (Italy)		EMR		EUR (European Union)		ESP (Spain)		FLA (Flanders)		LIM (Limburg (Belgium))		LOM		Points
1	(Italy) Andrea Bonacorsi	Fantic	34	5	1	1	1	1	1	1	12	10	2	2	7	4	1	5	3	11	333
2	(Spain) David Braceras	Gas Gas	24	13	4	3	7	6	7	3	8	6	3	3	1	5	2	1	16	9	282
3	(Estonia) Meico Vettik	KTM	5	6	18	6	3	14	6	8	1	4	1	5	4	22	28	4	2	2	268
4	(Sweden) Max Pålsson	KTM	19	23	7	15	11	3	13	5	3	3	4	7	3	3	3	16	1	1	263
5	(Italy) Pietro Razzini	Husqvarna	28	10	8	2	2	2	3	7	5	8	13	9	16	13	4	9	4	15	240
6	(Spain) Guillem Farrés	Gas Gas	16	12	2	4	5	4	2	2	23	Ret	Ret	DNS	5	1	18	21	6	3	211
7	(Italy) Andrea Roncoli	Husqvarna	27	9	16	12	9	7	8	11	9	2	9	1	13	11	5	7	22	DNS	194
8	(France) Quentin Prugnieres	KTM	DNQ	DNQ	11	5	18	8	9	4	10	9	6	4	Ret	8	14	8	14	4	186
9	(Italy) Valerio Lata	KTM	22	31	15	7	6	16	4	6	2	1	5	10	23	23	20	13	15	12	171
10	(Norway) Håkon Østerhagen	KTM	7	4	29	Ret	28	Ret	27	21	15	16	8	14	6	2	8	2	5	5	167
11	(France) Saad Soulimani	KTM	12	15	13	8	15	11	10	10	Ret	5	7	6	14	Ret	9	19	9	Ret	152
12	(France) Florian Miot	KTM	6	3	Ret	DNS	33	13	20	Ret					2	6	6	6	8	Ret	124
13	(Switzerland) Kevin Brumann	Yamaha	2	2	10	13	10	10	11	14	13	14									117
14	(Netherlands) Scott Smulders	Husqvarna	13	21	17	20	17	5	19	Ret	16	19			9	15	23	3	10	20	92
15	(Russia) Nikita Kucherov	KTM	14	28	25	23	20	12	17	17	19	15			20	12	11	10	13	7	86
16	(Latvia) Kārlis Reišulis	KTM	32	29							7	7			15	14	7	12	17	8	81
17	(Spain) Gerard Congost	Gas Gas			6	9	8	17	15	13	17	Ret	10	23	Ret	DNS					73
18	(Belgium) Liam Everts	KTM	1	1	5	Ret															66
19	(Netherlands) Cas Valk	KTM			31	24	27	26	24	18	4	26			12	7	15	15	19	13	66
20	(Germany) Constantin Piller	KTM	Ret	32	3	14	12	9	5	Ret											64
21	(Czech Republic) Martin Venhoda	KTM	21	19	19	18	13	18	14	25			12	18	8	Ret	10	18	Ret	Ret	64
22	(Netherlands) Ivano Van Erp	Yamaha	29	26	23	19	26	22	Ret	26	27	DNS	15	8	18	19	19	22	7	6	57
23	(Denmark) Rasmus Pedersen	KTM	3	20	9	Ret									11	17	21	14	28	19	56
24	(France) Xavier Cazal	KTM	30	17	12	16	23	15	18	19	14	Ret			21	20	17	20	Ret	10	53
25	(Italy) Andrea Rossi	KTM			22	10	4	25	12	12	24	17									51
26	(Netherlands) Kay Karssemakers	Yamaha									22	DNS	16	12	10	9	DNQ	DNQ	Ret	17	41
27	(Finland) Sampo Rainio	Husqvarna	DNQ	DNQ											22	10	24	11	11	16	36
28	(Italy) Matteo Russi	KTM			Ret	11	14	27	16	9											34
29	(Estonia) Romeo Karu	Husqvarna	DNQ	DNQ											17	16	13	38	12	14	33
30	(Spain) Raul Sanchez	Yamaha	DNQ	DNQ	24	22	Ret	29	DNS	Ret	11	Ret	11	11	27	Ret	Ret	26	26	22	30
31	(France) Maxime Grau	KTM	8	8																	26
32	(Germany) Cato Nickel	KTM	4	22	26	DSQ	19	Ret	22	16											25
33	(United Kingdom) Eddie Wade	KTM	10	7																	25
34	(United Kingdom) Bobby Bruce	Husqvarna	DNS	DNS							6	13									23
35	(Italy) Davide Zampino	KTM			20	17	22	20	21	20	26	12	22	17	32	34	36	33	DNQ	DNQ	20
36	(Italy) Daniel Gimm	Yamaha	36	38	14	21	Ret	21	26	15	Ret	22	17	Ret			27	Ret	29	21	17
37	(Denmark) William Kleemann	Husqvarna	15	34	21	27	24	Ret	23	22					19	21	16	23	18	Ret	16
38	(Spain) David Beltran	Gas Gas	Ret	36																	15
38	(Spain) David Beltran	KTM											14	13							15
39	(Italy) Andrea Viano	Husqvarna									18	11									13
40	(Finland) Kasimir Hindersson	KTM													24	25	12	17	DNQ	DNQ	13
41	(United Kingdom) Joel Rizzi	Husqvarna	9	24																	12
42	(United States) Max Vohland	KTM	17	14																	11
43	(Latvia) Mairis Pumpurs	Yamaha	11	25	DNS	DNS															10
44	(Netherlands) Kjell Verbruggen	KTM	35	11																	10
45	(Spain) Edgar Canet	KTM	33	33	27	Ret	21	19	33	DNS			20	15	DNQ	32	26	31	27	28	9
46	(Spain) Diego Torrijo	KTM	DNQ	DNQ									18	16							8
47	(Denmark) Magnus Smith	Yamaha	18	18																	6
48	(France) Alexis Fueri	Yamaha			Ret	28	16	Ret	Ret	29											5
49	(South Africa) Camden McLellan	Husqvarna	31	16																	5
50	(Israel) Suff Sella	KTM	23	39			25	24	25	23	20	18									4
51	(Czech Republic) Radek Vetrovsky	KTM	20	27											Ret	Ret			23	18	4
52	(Netherlands) Dave Kooiker	Yamaha			35	Ret	34	Ret							Ret	18					3
53	(France) Kiliann Poll	KTM									28	25	19	21							2
54	(France) Mathis Barthez	Yamaha									Ret	27	24	19							2
55	(United Kingdom) Ethan Lane	KTM											21	20	33	29	25	30	Ret	DNS	1
56	(Spain) Victor Alonso	Yamaha			Ret	Ret	29	28	Ret	DNS	29	23	Ret	DNS	DNQ	DNQ	29	35	20	29	1
57	(Italy) Ferruccio Zanchi	Husqvarna									25	20									1
	(France) Nicolas Duhamel	Husqvarna			32	25	31	Ret	28	24	21	Ret			34	Ret	39	29	21	31	0
	(Brazil) Rodolfo Bicalho	KTM			30	26	30	23	31	27	Ret	21									0
	(Latvia) Roberts Lūsis	KTM													26	27	22	24	Ret	23	0
	(Russia) Ilya Pavliv	KTM											23	22							0
	(Latvia) Uldis Freibergs	Husqvarna													30	24	30	28	25	24	0
	(Spain) Gonzalo Vargas	Yamaha											25	24							0
	(Sweden) Felix Boberg	KTM	DNQ	DNQ											DNQ	DNQ	33	27	24	30	0
	(France) Marc-Antoine Rossi	KTM									30	24									0
	(Belgium) Baptiste Beernaert	KTM													25	28			31	25	0
	(Belarus) Daniel Volovich	KTM	Ret	40	DNQ	DNQ	35	31	30	32	32	DNS			28	26	31	25	Ret	35	0
	(Spain) Daniel Carcaboso	KTM											26	25			38	36	DNQ	34	0
	(United Kingdom) Preston Williams	KTM	25	37																	0
	(France) Johan Bourdieu	Husqvarna											27	26							0
	(United Kingdom) Ollie Colmer	KTM													29	31	37	37	33	26	0
	(Germany) Valentin Kees	KTM	26	30	Ret	DNS															0
	(Belgium) Junior Bal	Husqvarna	DNQ	DNQ	DNQ	30	36	32	32	31					31	30	32	39	30	27	0
	(Italy) Alberto Brida	TM			33	29	32	33	29	28											0
	(Russia) Artemy Rausov	KTM			DNQ	DNQ	37	30	34	30	34	28			DNQ	DNQ	DNQ	DNQ	DNQ	DNQ	0
	(Italy) Tiberio Mazzantini	KTM	Ret	35	28	Ret															0
	(Italy) Luca Ruffini	KTM									31	Ret									0
	(Netherlands) Bryan Nelis	KTM													DNQ	DNQ	DNQ	DNQ	32	32	0
	(Netherlands) Boaz Bijtjes	KTM													35	33	35	32	Ret	36	0
	(Belgium) Yoran Moens	KTM	DNQ	DNQ	DNS	DNS					33	Ret			Ret	Ret					0
	(Netherlands) Bradley Mesters	Husqvarna																	DNQ	33	0
	(Latvia) Jānis Kubuliņš	Yamaha													DNQ	DNQ	34	34	DNQ	DNQ	0
	(Italy) Niccolo Maggiora	Husqvarna	DNQ	DNQ	34	Ret									DNQ	DNQ	DNQ	DNQ			0
	(Italy) Matteo De Sanctis	Husqvarna									35	Ret									0
	(Spain) Alejandro Tertre	KTM											DNS	DNS			DNQ	DNQ	DNQ	DNQ	0
	(United Kingdom) Harvey Cashmore	KTM	DNQ	DNQ											DNQ	DNQ	DNQ	DNQ	DNQ	DNQ	0
	(Belgium) Lennert Verhoeven	KTM	DNQ	DNQ											DNQ	DNQ	DNQ	DNQ	DNQ	DNQ	0
	(Netherlands) Didier van Kasteren	Husqvarna													DNQ	DNQ	DNQ	DNQ	DNQ	DNQ	0
	(Belgium) Sam Jordant	Yamaha													DNQ	DNQ	DNQ	DNQ	DNQ	DNQ	0
	(United Kingdom) Jacob Randall	KTM	DNQ	DNQ											DNQ	DNQ					0
	(Luxembourg) Jamie Heinen	KTM													DNQ	DNQ			DNQ	DNQ	0
	(France) Killian Vincent	KTM	DNQ	DNQ																	0
	(United Kingdom) Louie Kessell	KTM	DNQ	DNQ																	0
	(France) Alan Harnois	KTM	DNQ	DNQ																	0
	(Germany) Max Thunecke	KTM	DNQ	DNQ																	0
	(Estonia) Martin Michelis	KTM	DNQ	DNQ																	0
	(Spain) Gilen Albisua	KTM	DNQ	DNQ																	0
	(United Kingdom) Luke Hull	Yamaha	DNQ	DNQ																	0
	(United Kingdom) Alfie Jones	KTM	DNQ	DNQ																	0
	(Belgium) Lucas Coenen	KTM	DNQ	DNQ																	0
	(Netherlands) Jens Walvoort	KTM	DNQ	DNQ																	0
	(United Kingdom) Vinnie Guthrie	KTM	DNQ	DNQ																	0
	(United Kingdom) Charlie Palmer	Husqvarna	DNQ	DNQ																	0
	(France) Leo Lefaure	KTM	DNQ	DNQ																	0
	(Germany) Noel Schmitt	KTM	DNQ	DNQ																	0
	(United Kingdom) Jude Morris	Husqvarna	DNQ	DNQ																	0
	(Belgium) Lucas Roulet	Husqvarna	DNQ	DNQ																	0
	(United Kingdom) Arai Elcock	Husqvarna	DNQ	DNQ																	0
	(Belgium) Hugo Richard	Yamaha																	DNQ	DNQ	0
Pos	Rider	Bike	GBR (United Kingdom)		ITA (Italy)		CDF (Italy)		EMR		EUR (European Union)		ESP (Spain)		FLA (Flanders)		LIM (Limburg (Belgium))		LOM		Points

=== Manufacturers Championship ===
EMX125 manufacturers championship
Pos	Bike	GBR (United Kingdom)		ITA (Italy)		CDF (Italy)		EMR		EUR (European Union)		ESP (Spain)		FLA (Flanders)		LIM (Limburg (Belgium))		LOM		Points
1	KTM	1	1	3	5	3	3	4	4	1	1	1	4	2	2	3	2	1	1	391
2	Gas Gas	16	12	2	3	5	4	2	2	8	6	3	3	1	1	2	1	6	3	334
3	Fantic	Ret	5	1	1	1	1	1	1	12	10	2	2	7	4	1	5	3	10	333
4	Husqvarna	9	9	8	2	2	2	3	7	5	2	9	1	9	10	4	3	4	14	298
5	Yamaha	2	2	10	13	10	10	11	14	11	14	11	8	10	9	19	22	7	6	196
	TM			33	29	32	33	29	28											0
Pos	Bike	GBR (United Kingdom)		ITA (Italy)		CDF (Italy)		EMR		EUR (European Union)		ESP (Spain)		FLA (Flanders)		LIM (Limburg (Belgium))		LOM		Points

== EMX Open ==
A 6-round calendar for the 2020 season was announced on 16 October 2019. EMX Open is for riders competing on 2-stroke and 4-stroke motorcycles up to 450cc.

=== Calendar ===
EMX Open Completed Grand Prix
Round	Date	Grand Prix	Location	Race 1 Winner	Race 2 Winner	Round Winner	Report
1	9 August	Latvia	Ķegums	(Latvia) Toms Macuks	(Latvia) Toms Macuks	(Latvia) Toms Macuks	
2	12 August	Riga	Ķegums	(Finland) Kim Savaste	(Estonia) Karel Kutsar	(Estonia) Karel Kutsar	
3	16 August	Ķegums	Ķegums	(Finland) Kim Savaste	(Estonia) Karel Kutsar	(Finland) Kim Savaste	
4	31 October	Trentino	Pietramurata	(France) Jimmy Clochet	(France) Jimmy Clochet	(France) Jimmy Clochet	
5	3 November	(Italy) Pietramurata	Pietramurata	(Finland) Kim Savaste	(France) Jimmy Clochet	(Latvia) Toms Macuks	
6	7 November	(Italy) Garda Trentino	Pietramurata	(France) Jimmy Clochet	(Norway) Cornelius Tøndel	(France) Jimmy Clochet	

EMX Open Grand Prix cancelled due to the COVID-19 pandemic
Original Date	Grand Prix	Location
10 May	France	St Jean d'Angely
17 May	Italy	Maggiora
24 May	Germany	Teutschenthal
7 June	Russia	Orlyonok
6 September	Turkey	Afyonkarahisar

=== Entry list ===
EMX Open entry list
Team	Constructor	No	Rider	Rounds
Husqvarna Junior Racing Maddii	Husqvarna	3	(Italy) Federico Tuani	1–3
Husqvarna Junior Racing Maddii	Husqvarna	270	(Italy) Eugenio Barbaglia	1–3
A1M Motorsport/KHAR	Husqvarna	9	(Finland) Rene Rannikko	1–3
Zemaitija Racing	Husqvarna	18	(Lithuania) Domantas Jazdauskas	All
Kros Team Gaerne	Honda	43	(Italy) Davide De Bortoli	4–6
	Honda	46	(Italy) Vittorino Trivellato	6
Gabriel Insulation Racing	KTM	49	(United Kingdom) John Adamson	4–6
Denicol	KTM	53	(Belgium) Greg Smets	1–3
MX4 Dobele Yamaha	Yamaha	61	(Latvia) Arnolds Sniķers	1–3
BG Voima	Husqvarna	62	(Estonia) Andero Lusbo	1–3
Kytonen Motorsport	Husqvarna	65	(Finland) Juuso Matikainen	1–3
PuriCure Team	Honda	67	(Czech Republic) Petr Michalec	4–6
Rodeo MX Racing Team	KTM	92	(Latvia) Toms Macuks	All
Orion Racing Team	KTM	98	(Czech Republic) Petr Rathousky	4–6
Orion Racing Team	KTM	101	(Czech Republic) Petr Bartos	4–6
RT973 Racing Division	Suzuki	102	(Italy) Tomas Ragadini	1–3
Team Castrol Power1 Moto Base	Suzuki	108	(Germany) Stefan Ekerold	All
Husqvarna Motorcycles España	Husqvarna	124	(Spain) Simeo Ubach	1–5
Sõmerpalu MK	KTM	132	(Estonia) Karel Kutsar	All
SKS Husqvarna Racing Team	Husqvarna	147	(Finland) Miro Sihvonen	1–3
JD Gunnex KTM Racing Team	KTM	151	(Czech Republic) Libor Pletka	4–6
JD Gunnex KTM Racing Team	KTM	535	(Czech Republic) Radek Vetrovsky	5–6
BvZ Racing Team	KTM	171	(Germany) Fynn-Niklas Tornau	1, 4–6
BvZ Racing Team	KTM	610	(Denmark) Mads Sjøholm	1–2, 4–6
Cab SCreens/Deos Group Racing	Honda	195	(United Kingdom) Dan Thornhill	4–6
	KTM	199	(Estonia) Tanel Rauk	1–2
HT Group Racing Team	KTM	232	(Czech Republic) Martin Michek	4–6
NR83	KTM	271	(Czech Republic) Stanislav Vasicek	1–3
JWR Racing	Honda	302	(Norway) Cornelius Tøndel	All
Yamaha Store Roskilde	Yamaha	334	(Denmark) Mathias Gryning	4–6
PAR Homes RFX Husqvarna	Husqvarna	360	(United Kingdom) Nathan Dixon	1–3
	KTM	420	(Italy) Andrea Rossi	4
A1M Motorsport	Husqvarna	430	(Finland) Wiljam Malin	4–6
	Husqvarna	472	(Spain) Salvador Ubach	1–3
137 KTM Motorsport	KTM	485	(Finland) Kim Savaste	All
Motorrad Waldmann	Honda	491	(Germany) Paul Haberland	4–6
Rambas R	Husqvarna	511	(Latvia) Kārlis Kalējs	1–3
Kawasaki France	Kawasaki	520	(France) Jimmy Clochet	4–6
	KTM	537	(Netherlands) Damian Wedage	All
Mulders Motoren KTM	KTM	653	(Netherlands) Rob Windt	4–6
Motos Arribas Racing Team	Husqvarna	812	(Spain) Angel Arribas	1–3
WPM Motors	KTM	822	(Netherlands) Mike Bolink	All
Ride House Team Pastorello Competition	Kawasaki	831	(France) Brice Maylin	6
Indeka Group	KTM	991	(Poland) Szymon Staszkiewicz	1–3

=== Riders Championship ===
EMX Open riders championship
Pos	Rider	Bike	LAT (Latvia)		RIG		KEG		TRE		PIE (Italy)		GAR (Italy)		Points
1	(Estonia) Karel Kutsar	KTM	2	2	2	1	6	1	9	3	3	3	5	10	230
2	(Latvia) Toms Macuks	KTM	1	1	DSQ	Ret	2	2	4	4	2	2	2	3	216
3	(Finland) Kim Savaste	KTM	7	5	1	2	1	3	5	8	1	5	DNS	DNS	192
4	(Germany) Stefan Ekerold	Suzuki	3	6	4	3	9	13	10	7	12	14	8	7	161
5	(Norway) Cornelius Tøndel	Honda	Ret	DNS	17	21	4	5	3	6	4	4	Ret	1	134
6	(France) Jimmy Clochet	Kawasaki							1	1	13	1	1	2	130
7	(Lithuania) Domantas Jazdauskas	Husqvarna	6	7	10	11	10	15	Ret	15	11	11	14	8	113
8	(Italy) Davide De Bortoli	Honda							2	2	5	10	9	4	101
9	(Finland) Miro Sihvonen	Husqvarna	10	3	3	9	3	4							101
10	(Estonia) Andero Lusbo	Husqvarna	4	4	5	4	5	14							93
11	(Czech Republic) Martin Michek	KTM							11	5	9	6	4	5	87
12	(Finland) Juuso Matikainen	Husqvarna	5	9	8	8	7	6							83
13	(United Kingdom) Dan Thornhill	Honda							7	12	10	8	6	6	77
14	(Latvia) Kārlis Kalējs	Husqvarna	9	8	7	7	8	12							75
15	(Belgium) Greg Smets	KTM	11	10	13	6	11	8							67
16	(United Kingdom) John Adamson	KTM							6	Ret	6	7	3	Ret	64
17	(Spain) Simeo Ubach	Husqvarna	12	16	11	13	13	10	16	19	19	Ret			60
18	(Denmark) Mathias Gryning	Yamaha							8	11	7	12	Ret	9	58
19	(Netherlands) Mike Bolink	KTM	17	17	19	18	19	18	15	10	17	16	15	13	58
20	(Denmark) Mads Sjøholm	KTM	8	Ret	15	14			17	9	18	9	DNS	DNS	57
21	(United Kingdom) Nathan Dixon	Husqvarna	13	Ret	6	5	16	11							54
22	(Finland) Rene Rannikko	Husqvarna	16	14	Ret	10	14	7							44
23	(Italy) Eugenio Barbaglia	Husqvarna	14	12	9	19	12	19							41
24	(Czech Republic) Petr Michalec	Honda							18	16	15	15	10	11	41
25	(Czech Republic) Petr Rathousky	KTM							14	18	14	13	7	20	40
26	(Czech Republic) Petr Bartos	KTM							13	14	16	18	13	12	40
27	(Latvia) Arnolds Sniķers	Yamaha	15	11	12	15	17	17							39
28	(Poland) Szymon Staszkiewicz	KTM	18	15	16	17	18	9							33
29	(Germany) Paul Haberland	Honda							Ret	13	8	Ret	Ret	15	27
30	(Netherlands) Rob Windt	KTM							12	21	Ret	19	11	17	25
31	(Italy) Federico Tuani	Husqvarna	20	Ret	14	16	15	16							24
32	(Finland) Wiljam Malin	Husqvarna							19	17	20	17	17	16	20
33	(Italy) Tomas Ragadini	Suzuki	19	13	23	12	21	Ret							19
34	(France) Brice Maylin	Kawasaki											12	14	16
35	(Netherlands) Damian Wedage	KTM	25	DNS	18	20	20	20	21	20	Ret	21	18	19	12
36	(Germany) Fynn-Niklas Tornau	KTM	21	Ret					20	Ret	21	20	16	18	10
37	(Spain) Salvador Ubach	Husqvarna	23	18	21	22	22	21							3
38	(Czech Republic) Radek Vetrovsky	KTM									22	Ret	19	21	2
39	(Estonia) Tanel Rauk	KTM	22	19	22	Ret									2
40	(Spain) Angel Arribas	Husqvarna	24	21	20	23	Ret	23							1
41	(Czech Republic) Libor Pletka	KTM							22	Ret	23	22	20	22	1
42	(Czech Republic) Stanislav Vasicek	KTM	26	20	Ret	24	23	22							1
	(Italy) Vittorino Trivellato	Honda											21	23	0
	(Italy) Andrea Rossi	KTM							Ret	DNS					0
Pos	Rider	Bike	LAT (Latvia)		RIG		KEG		TRE		PIE (Italy)		GAR (Italy)		Points

=== Manufacturers Championship ===
EMX Open manufacturers championship
Pos	Bike	LAT (Latvia)		RIG		KEG		TRE		PIE (Italy)		GAR (Italy)		Points
1	KTM	1	1	1	1	1	1	4	3	1	2	2	3	277
2	Husqvarna	4	3	3	4	3	4	16	15	11	11	14	8	165
3	Suzuki	3	6	4	3	9	13	10	7	12	14	8	7	161
4	Honda	Ret	DNS	17	21	4	5	2	2	4	4	6	1	158
5	Kawasaki							1	1	13	1	1	2	130
6	Yamaha	15	11	12	15	17	17	8	11	7	12	Ret	9	97
Pos	Bike	LAT (Latvia)		RIG		KEG		TRE		PIE (Italy)		GAR (Italy)		Points

== EMX2T ==
A 5-round calendar for the 2020 season was announced on 16 October 2019. EMX2T is for riders competing on 2-stroke motorcycles of 250cc.

=== Calendar ===
EMX2T completed Grand Pix
Round	Date	Grand Prix	Location	Race 1 Winner	Race 2 Winner	Round Winner	Report
1	6 September	Italy	Faenza	(Switzerland) Loris Freidig	(United Kingdom) Brad Anderson	(United Kingdom) Brad Anderson	
2	9 September	(Italy) Citta di Faenza	Faenza	(United Kingdom) Brad Anderson	(United Kingdom) Brad Anderson	(United Kingdom) Brad Anderson	
3	13 September	Emilia-Romagna	Faenza	(United Kingdom) Brad Anderson	(United Kingdom) Brad Anderson	(United Kingdom) Brad Anderson	
4	3 November	(Italy) Pietramurata	Pietramurata	(Italy) Nicholas Lapucci	(Italy) Nicholas Lapucci	(Italy) Nicholas Lapucci	
5	7 November	(Italy) Garda Trentino	Pietramurata	(Italy) Nicholas Lapucci	(Italy) Nicholas Lapucci	(Italy) Nicholas Lapucci	

EMX2T Grand Prix cancelled due to the COVID-19 pandemic
Original Date	Grand Prix	Location
26 July	Czech Republic	Loket
25 August	Finland	Kymi Ring

=== Entry list ===
EMX2T entry list
Team	Constructor	No	Rider	Rounds
Husqvarna Junior Racing Maddii	Husqvarna	3	(Italy) Federico Tuani	All
Husqvarna Junior Racing Maddii	Husqvarna	14	(Italy) Pietro Salina	4–5
Husqvarna Junior Racing Maddii	Husqvarna	270	(Italy) Eugenio Barbaglia	All
3C Racing CM Team	Yamaha	21	(Italy) Marco Lolli	All
	KTM	40	(Estonia) Martin Michelis	All
Verde Substance KTM	KTM	60	(United Kingdom) Brad Anderson	All
BG Voima	Husqvarna	62	(Estonia) Andero Lusbo	1
	KTM	75	(United Kingdom) Aaron Ongley	4–5
PAR Homes RFX Husqvarna	Husqvarna	91	(United Kingdom) Charlie Putnam	4–5
	TM	101	(Czech Republic) Vaclav Kovar	4
RPM Racing Team	Husqvarna	158	(Italy) Gianmarco Maiolani	1–3
	KTM	161	(United Kingdom) Aidan Williams	All
	Husqvarna	197	(Germany) Thomas Haas	All
Orion Racing Team	KTM	202	(Czech Republic) Jonas Nedved	All
Fantic Racing Team	Fantic	211	(Italy) Nicholas Lapucci	4–5
Weber-Motos Racing	Husqvarna	254	(Portugal) Alexandre Marques	1
	Yamaha	446	(Denmark) Mikkel Aabroe	4–5
Moto Perfections Yamaha	Yamaha	331	(Switzerland) Loris Freidig	All
JTX Racing	KTM	365	(Denmark) Nikolaj Christensen	All
JK Racing Yamaha	Yamaha	371	(Italy) Manuel Iacopi	All
	Yamaha	373	(Italy) Alessio Bonetta	4
Piazza Race Team	KTM	380	(Italy) Massimiliano Piazza	1–2
MBT Racing Team	Husqvarna	385	(Italy) Sebastian Zenato	1–2, 4–5
MBT Racing Team	Husqvarna	838	(Italy) Paolo Ermini	1–2, 4–5
Team BBR Offroad	Husqvarna	499	(Italy) Emanuele Alberio	All
Motor2000 KTM	KTM	601	(United Kingdom) Kelton Gwyther	4–5
	Suzuki	651	(Canada) Kade Tinkler-Walker	All
MGR Motocross Team	KTM	885	(Italy) Jacopo Rampoldi	1–3
MGR Motocross Team	KTM	974	(Italy) Mario Tamai	All
Deghi Gomme	KTM	888	(Italy) Gianluca Deghi	1–3
	KTM	938	(Brazil) Rodolfo Bicalho	4–5

=== Riders Championship ===
EMX2T riders championship
Pos	Rider	Bike	ITA (Italy)		CDF (Italy)		EMR		PIE (Italy)		GAR (Italy)		Points
1	(United Kingdom) Brad Anderson	KTM	2	1	1	1	1	1	2	2	2	2	235
2	(Italy) Federico Tuani	Husqvarna	3	3	5	18	4	3	3	4	5	5	167
3	(Canada) Kade Tinkler-Walker	Suzuki	5	DNS	2	6	5	5	4	5	3	6	154
4	(Switzerland) Loris Freidig	Yamaha	1	7	8	2	7	15	6	6	6	13	147
5	(Italy) Eugenio Barbaglia	Husqvarna	7	4	3	7	3	9	9	20	7	4	143
6	(Italy) Manuel Iacopi	Yamaha	Ret	5	11	DNS	2	4	5	3	4	3	140
7	(Italy) Mario Tamai	KTM	6	2	4	5	17	8	11	10	11	9	131
8	(Italy) Emanuele Alberio	KTM	10	19	7	8	6	2	8	7	8	7	131
9	(Italy) Marco Lolli	Yamaha	8	6	9	3	8	6	15	12	14	14	117
10	(Estonia) Martin Michelis	KTM	14	10	10	10	10	10	13	9	9	10	105
11	(Italy) Nicholas Lapucci	Fantic							1	1	1	1	100
12	(Denmark) Nikolaj Christensen	KTM	12	14	14	12	11	11	12	8	15	11	90
13	(Czech Republic) Jonas Nedved	KTM	11	20	6	9	9	7	10	Ret	12	Ret	84
14	(Italy) Paolo Ermini	Husqvarna	13	12	13	11			7	Ret	10	8	73
15	(Italy) Sebastian Zenato	Husqvarna	9	9	12	15			14	11	13	15	70
16	(Italy) Gianluca Deghi	KTM	4	8	19	4	16	DNS					56
17	(Germany) Thomas Haas	Husqvarna	16	16	15	13	13	12	22	17	Ret	19	47
18	(United Kingdom) Aidan Williams	KTM	15	13	16	14	12	13	Ret	22	20	Ret	44
19	(Brazil) Rodolfo Bicalho	KTM							16	13	17	12	26
20	(Italy) Jacopo Rampoldi	KTM	19	18	18	17	14	14					26
21	(Italy) Gianmarco Maiolani	Husqvarna	17	15	20	DNS	15	DNS					17
22	(United Kingdom) Charlie Putnam	Husqvarna							18	15	18	16	17
23	(Italy) Pietro Salina	Husqvarna							17	18	16	17	16
24	(Italy) Massimiliano Piazza	KTM	18	17	17	16							16
25	(Portugal) Alexandre Marques	Husqvarna	20	11									11
26	(Italy) Alessio Bonetta	Yamaha							20	14			8
27	(United Kingdom) Kelton Gwyther	KTM							19	16	Ret	DNS	7
28	(United Kingdom) Aaron Ongley	KTM							21	19	19	18	7
29	(Denmark) Mikkel Aabroe	Yamaha							23	21	DNS	20	1
	(Estonia) Andero Lusbo	Husqvarna	Ret	DNS									0
	(Czech Republic) Vaclav Kovar	TM							DNS	DNS			0
Pos	Rider	Bike	ITA (Italy)		CDF (Italy)		EMR		PIE (Italy)		GAR (Italy)		Points

=== Manufacturers Championship ===
EMX2T manufacturers championship
Pos	Bike	ITA (Italy)		CDF (Italy)		EMR		PIE (Italy)		GAR (Italy)		Points
1	KTM	2	1	1	1	1	1	2	2	2	2	235
2	Yamaha	1	5	8	2	2	4	5	3	4	3	190
3	Husqvarna	3	3	3	7	3	3	3	4	5	4	186
4	Suzuki	5	DNS	2	6	5	5	4	5	3	6	154
5	Fantic							1	1	1	1	100
	TM							DNS	DNS			0
Pos	Bike	ITA (Italy)		CDF (Italy)		EMR		PIE (Italy)		GAR (Italy)		Points

== EMX85 ==
A 1-round calendar for the 2020 season was announced on 16 October 2019. EMX85 is for riders competing on 2-stroke motorcycles of 85cc. This was later canceled by the FIM in April 2020.

=== Calendar ===
EMX85 Grand Prix cancelled due to the COVID-19 pandemic
Original Date	Grand Prix	Location
26 July	Czech Republic	Loket

== EMX65 ==
A 1-round calendar for the 2020 season was announced on 16 October 2019. EMX65 is for riders competing on 2-stroke motorcycles of 65cc. This was later canceled by the FIM in April 2020.

=== Calendar ===
EMX65 Grand Prix cancelled due to the COVID-19 pandemic
Original Date	Grand Prix	Location
26 July	Czech Republic	Loket
