= Camden McLellan =

South African motocross racer

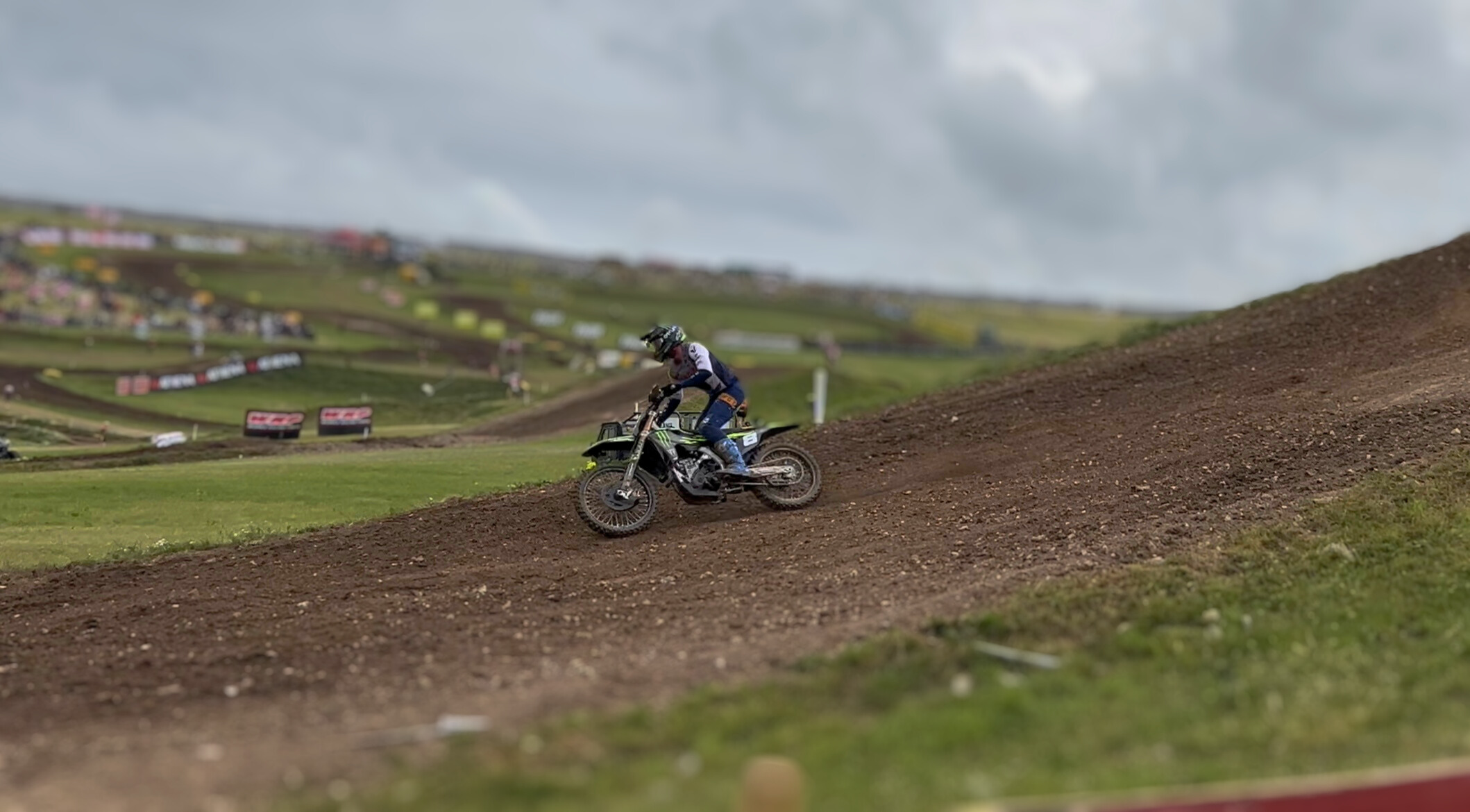
- McLellan in 2025
- Nationality: South African
- Born: 7 June 2004 (age 22) Johannesburg, South Africa

Motocross career
- Years active: 2022-Present
- Teams: •Triumph Racing Factory MX2 (2023-Present)
- Championships: •2018 EMX 85cc
- Wins: •MX2: 5
- GP debut: 2022 GP of Latvia, MX2
- First GP win: 2026 GP of Andalucia, Spain, MX2

Camden McLellan (born 7 June 2004) is a South African professional Motocross racer. McLellan has competed in the FIM Motocross World Championship since the 2022 season.

McLellan is currently signed to ride for the Monster Energy Triumph Racing team from the 2024 FIM Motocross World Championship onwards, making him part of Triumph's return to the sport of motocross.

At the 2025 MXGP of Trentino, McLellan won the first race in the MX2 class, marking Triumph's first world championship-level race win since their return to motocross. McLellan won his first overall grand prix at the Spanish round of the 2026 FIM Motocross World Championship. He won four further grand prix throughout the season and finished as runner-up in the MX2 class behind team mate Guillem Farrés.

In 2018, McLellan became the first South African rider to win a title in the European Motocross Championship, when he won the EMX85 class.

McLellan has represented his country at the Motocross of Nations on six occasions, with the most recent being at the 2026 edition.

== Career ==
=== Junior Career ===
McLellan grew up racing in the junior ranks throughout his native South Africa. This period saw him win several national championships and join the Red Bull KTM South Africa team. After winning his first title in the 85cc Pro Mini class in 2016, Mclellan travelled to the United States to compete in the Thor Mini O's event. He combined successfully defending the Pro Mini title in 2017 with a part-time racing schedule in Europe. Following this, McLellan competed in the 2017 FIM Motocross Junior World Championship, where he scored five points in the 85 class.

In 2018, McLellan made his full-time move to Europe, by signing for the German Kosak KTM team. This move saw him win the Junior Cup 85 class in Germany and win the EMX85 class of the 2018 European Motocross Championship. By doing this, he beat both Kay de Wolf and Liam Everts to become the first South African to win a European title. Following this, he finished fifth overall at the Junior World Championship in Australia. Staying with the Kosak team, McLellan moved up to compete on a 125cc KTM in the 2019 European Motocross Championship. In his first full season on the 125, he finished eighteenth in the final standings with four top-ten finishes. In Germany, McLellan finished third in the 125 Cup class of the ADAC MX Masters and in the 2019 FIM Motocross Junior World Championship he finished sixth overall with two ninth place finishes.

=== 250 Career ===
Following this, McLellan signed for the No Fear Jumbo BT Racing Team on a Husqvarna. After riding the opening round of the EMX125 class of the 2020 European Motocross Championship, Mclellan raced the rest of the season in the EMX250 class, where he finished seventeenth in the final standings.

==== 2021 ====
He remained with the team for the 2021 European Motocross Championship and after missing three rounds he finished sixteenth overall in the final EMX250 standings, with a fifth place in the opening race at the German round being his standout result. Following this he represented South Africa for the first time at the 2021 Motocross des Nations. A sixth place in the Saturday qualifying race saw him finish ahead of Simon Längenfelder, Mikkel Haarup & Roan van de Moosdijk.

==== 2022 ====
For the 2022 season, McLellan moved to the TBS Conversions Racing Team. This move saw the South African finish fourth in the final standings of the EMX250 class in the 2022 European Motocross Championship, picking up two podiums in the last three rounds. Alongside this, he raced in two rounds of the 2022 FIM Motocross World Championship in the MX2 class, picking up thirteen points at his second appearance in Czech Republic. These results saw McLellan picked to represent South Africa at the 2022 Motocross des Nations, his second consecutive appearance at the event.

==== 2023 ====
McLellan stepped up to the MX2 class in the 2023 FIM Motocross World Championship full-time with the JM Honda Racing team. A pre-season shoulder injury led to a dislocation in the practice session at the opening round. He returned at the seventh round and had several notable results in the latter half of the season, including fifth overall at the Swedish round. Following this, McLellan raced at the 2023 Motocross des Nations, where he was part of the South African team that finished thirteenth overall.

==== 2024 ====
For the 2024 season, he was signed alongside Mikkel Haarup to ride for the Monster Energy Triumph Racing Team, making him part of Triumph's return to the sport. This would see McLellan become a consistent front-runner in the MX2 class for the first time, picking up his first overall podium with third overall at the round in Sardinia. He missed five rounds in the middle of the season due to a fractured fibula sustained in Portugal and on his return picked up two more third place race finishes to finish ninth in the final standings. For the fourth consecutive year, McLellan represented South Africa by riding in the MX2 class at the 2024 Motocross des Nations.

==== 2025 ====
McLellan continued to improve in the MX2 class in the 2025 FIM Motocross World Championship. Consistent performances throughout the year were accompanied by two podium finishes, with second overall in Sardinia and Belgium. At the fifth round in Pietramurata, McLellan made history by winning the first race. This was not only his first MX2 race win but also the first win for Triumph since they returned to world championship motocross. After finishing fifth in the final standings, McLellan competed at the 2025 Motocross des Nations for South Africa, where the team finished fourteenth.

==== 2026 ====
McLellan continued to improve in the 2026 season, achieving a new career milestone by winning his first overall grand prix at the second round of the 2026 FIM Motocross World Championship, in Spain. As well as taking Triumph's first MX2 grand prix win, McLellan also took the championship leader's red plate for the first time. He would lose the lead at the following round but remained a consistent championship threat, having a run of four podiums in a row in France, Germany, Latvia and Italy. McLellan had a strong end to the season, taking the overall win in four of the last six grand prix and pulling himself into second in the final standings. As his team mate Farrés became world champion, this meant that it was a Triumph one-two at the top of the table. At the 2026 Motocross des Nations, McLellan had one of his strongest rides to date at the event, finishing second in his qualifying race and recording two top-ten finishes in the main races, with the team ending the event in fifteenth.

== Honours ==
Motocross World Championship

- MX2: 2026 (silver)

European Motocross Championship

- EMX85: 2018 (gold)

ADAC MX Masters

- Junior Cup 125: 2019 (bronze)
- Junior Cup 85: 2018 (gold)

South African Motocross Championship

- 85cc Pro Mini: 2016 & 2017 (gold)
- 65cc: 2015 (gold)

== MXGP Results ==
Year	Rnd 1	Rnd 2	Rnd 3	Rnd 4	Rnd 5	Rnd 6	Rnd 7	Rnd 8	Rnd 9	Rnd 10	Rnd 11	Rnd 12	Rnd 13	Rnd 14	Rnd 15	Rnd 16	Rnd 17	Rnd 18	Rnd 19	Rnd 20	Average Finish	Podium Percent	Place
2024 MX2	9	7	3	5	DNF	OUT	OUT	OUT	OUT	OUT	8	7	7	6	7	4	10	8	6	11	7.00	7%	7th
2025 MX2	5	15	8	2	6	5	14	8	10	7	6	7	6	8	2	7	4	7	5	13	7.25	10%	5th
2026 MX2	3 ARG (Argentina)	1 AND (Andalusia)	13 SUI (Switzerland)	4 SAR (Sardinia)	10 TRE	2 FRA (France)	3 GER (Germany)	2 LAT (Latvia)	3 ITA (Italy)	6 POR (Portugal)	5 RSA (South Africa)	3 GBR (United Kingdom)	2 CZE (Czech Republic)	1 FLA (Flanders)	3 SWE (Sweden)	1 NED (Netherlands)	4 TUR (Turkey)	1 CHN (China)	1 AUS (Australia)	-	3.57	68%	2nd
