= Sacha Coenen =

Belgian motocross racer

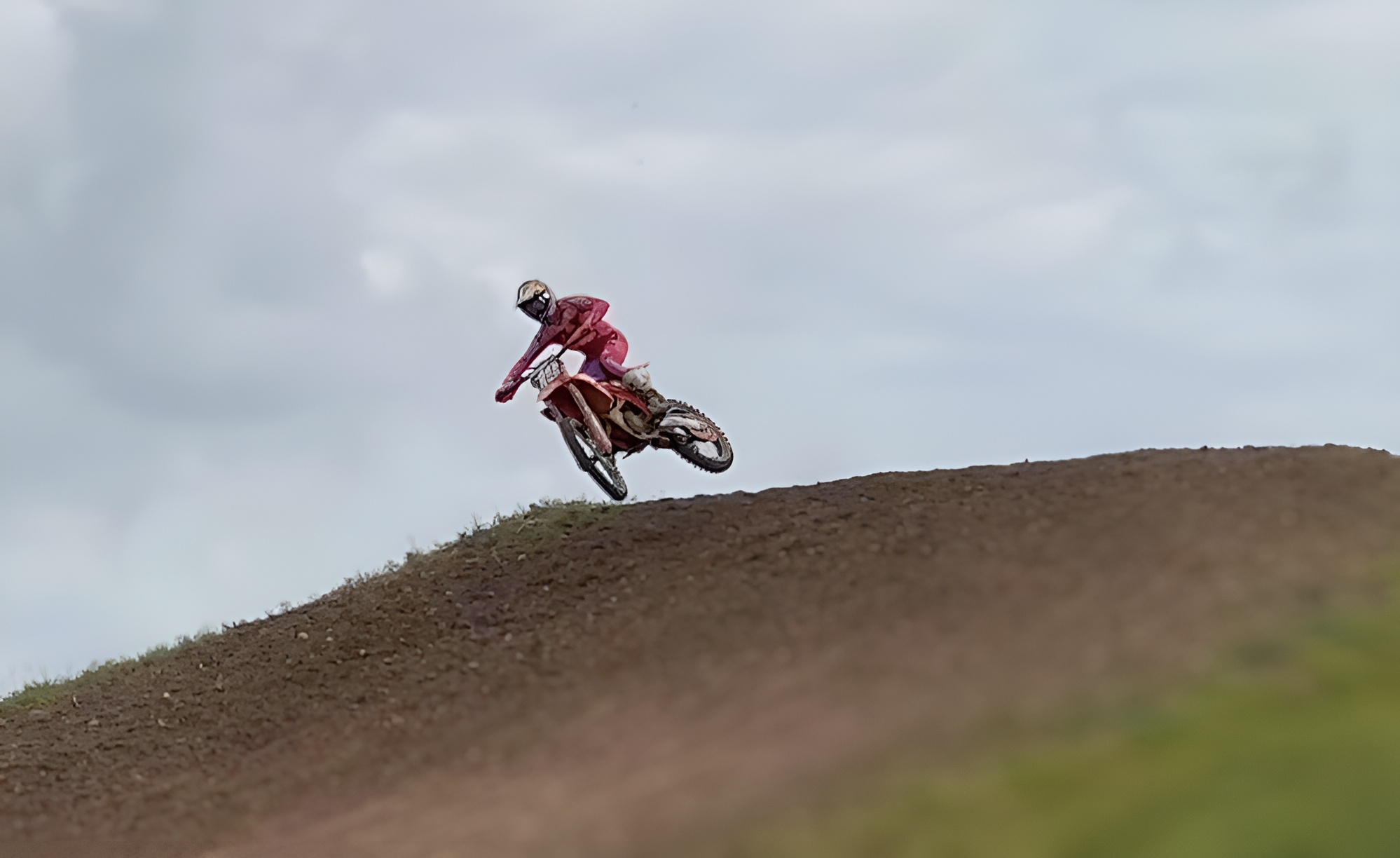
- Coenen in 2025
- Nationality: Belgian (Belgium)
- Born: 9 November 2006 (age 19) Belgium

Motocross career
- Years active: 2022–present
- Teams: •Red Bull KTM Factory Racing (2022–present)
- Wins: •AMA 250cc Motocross: 1; •MX2: 8
- GP debut: 2022, GP of Czech Republic, MX2
- First GP win: 2024, GP of Latvia, MX2

Sacha Coenen (born 9 November 2006) is a Belgian professional Motocross racer. Coenen has competed in the Motocross World Championship since 2022 in the MX2 class. He currently competes for the Red Bull KTM Factory Racing team.

Coenen took his first overall Grand Prix win during the 2024 FIM Motocross World Championship by winning the MX2 class at the Latvian round.

Coenen has twice represented his country at the Motocross des Nations and was part of the winning Belgian team at the 2026 event.

Coenen is the twin brother of Lucas Coenen, who is also a World Championship-level motocross racer.

== Career ==
=== Junior Career ===
Alongside his brother, Coenen debuted in the European Motocross Championship in 2016, in the 65cc class. Returning the following year, he was able to finish tenth overall in the same class. In his first season in the 85cc class in 2018, Coenen competed on a small wheel machine for most of the year due to his size. The Coenen brothers competed around Europe in 2019, joining the Grizzly Racing Yamaha team for their second season in the 85cc class. This resulted in him winning the 85cc class at the Coupe de l'Avenir event and scoring points in both the European Motocross Championship and the FIM Motocross Junior World Championship. 2020 was Coenen's final year racing an 85, this time on a KTM. This saw him win the Espoirs 85cc class as part of the French Elite Motocross Championship, winning all but one race on the way to this title.

Following his success on an 85, Coenen moved up to compete full-time in the EMX125 class of the 2021 European Motocross Championship for the Bud Racing team. At the first round of the season, Coenen immediately showed his potential, qualifying second and finishing third in the opening race. By the third round in Germany, he was able to take his first European Championship-level race win. A hand injury stopped him racing in the final four rounds of the season and he eventually finished fifteenth in the final standings. In addition, Coenen finished runner-up behind his brother in the Junior 125cc of the French Elite Motocross Championship, winning three races and two overall rounds.

=== 250 Career ===
Continuing his rapid rise through the ranks Coenen, alongside his brother, moved to the Jumbo Husqvarna BT Racing Team for the EMX250 class of the 2022 European Motocross Championship. The young Belgian rider showed race winning speed throughout the season, but crashes cost him notable results - such as in the second race at the German round when he was leading. This combined with two rounds missed due to injury saw him finish nineteenth in the standings. Alongside this he also made his FIM World Motocross Championship debut in the MX2 class at the Czech round.

After this single season in EMX250, Coenen was signed by the Red Bull KTM Factory Racing team to compete in the MX2 class of the 2023 FIM Motocross World Championship. At a pre-season race he picked up a dislocated shoulder which saw miss the first four rounds of the championship. Upon his return, Coenen quickly proved his competitiveness with several top-ten finishes throughout the rest of the season. Sixth overall at the Swedish round was his highest result on the way to 14th in the final standings. The 2024 season saw Coenen continue his rapid adaption to the MX2 class, as he scored regular holeshots to lead races and contend for finishing positions in the top-six places. This went alongside multiple crashes which saw him miss some notable results, such as at the sixth round in Galicia where he crashed on the last lap of the qualifying race whilst leading. By the ninth round in Latvia, he was able to transform his speed into taking his first race win and with it his first overall grand prix victory. A week later, Coenen was able to win his second grand prix overall at the Maggiora track in Italy. He missed the last three rounds of the season with a leg injury, which also ruled him out of the 2024 Motocross des Nations in what would have been his debut at the event.

With his brother moving to the MXGP class, Coenen started the 2025 FIM Motocross World Championship strongly in the MX2 class, finishing second overall at the opening round after winning the second race. Throughout the rest of the season, he was a constant figure at the front of the class, particularly at the start. Many small crashes led to him losing positions but despite this he ended the season with ten overall podiums, two of which were Grand Prix wins in Latvia and China. In addition to this, he took his first qualifying race wins in Turkey and China, before finishing the season in fourth in the final standings. Due to his results, Coenen was selected to represent Belgium at the 2025 Motocross des Nations, his debut in the event. After impressing by winning his qualifying race on the Saturday, Coenen crashed several times in Sunday's main races, as the team finished fourth overall.

Coenen, along with his brother, embarked on an ambitious year in 2026, combining his MXGP campaign with selected rounds of the 2026 AMA National Motocross Championship in America. He had a strong start to the year, winning the opening round of the pre-season Italian International Championship, before going on to win the qualifying races at the first five rounds of the 2026 FIM Motocross World Championship in the MX2 class. At the last of these he also recorded a double race win on the Sunday in Trentino, to take his first grand prix win of the season. Two rounds later in Germany he took the championship leaders red plate and extended his lead with wins at the following two rounds. At his first appearance in America, he would win the second race and when he returned at the round held in the sand of Southwick he would win both races in dominant fashion. On the way to winning the second race, however, he had a big crash that was revealed to have caused a broken collarbone after the race. After getting surgery soon after, Coenen competed again just one week later at the MXGP of Great Britain, where he lost the championship lead to eventual champion Guillem Farrés. Throughout the rest of the season, his championship ambitions further fell away, despite a dominant grand prix win in Sweden - as he finished with the bronze medal in the final standings. Following this, he represented his country for a second time at the 2026 Motocross des Nations, where his results were key in achieving Belgium's first win for thirteen years at the event. As well as the Coenen's becoming the first twins to win the event, he also picked up the Ricky Carmichael Award for the best young rider, something his brother had already won three years earlier.

== Honours ==
FIM Motocross World Championship

- Acerbis Best Lap Competition Award: 2026 (gold)
- Fox Holeshot Award: 2026 (gold)

Motocross des Nations

- Team Overall: 2026 (Belgium) (gold)
- Ricky Carmichael Motocross of Nations Youngest Rider Award: 2026 (gold)

French Elite Motocross Championship

- Juniors: 2021 (silver)
- Espoirs: 2020 (gold)

Coupe de l'Avenir

- 85cc: 2019 (gold)
- 65cc: 2017 (silver)

== MXGP Results ==
Year	Rnd 1	Rnd 2	Rnd 3	Rnd 4	Rnd 5	Rnd 6	Rnd 7	Rnd 8	Rnd 9	Rnd 10	Rnd 11	Rnd 12	Rnd 13	Rnd 14	Rnd 15	Rnd 16	Rnd 17	Rnd 18	Rnd 19	Rnd 20	Average Finish	Podium Percent	Place
2024 MX2	8	9	9	16	16	6	11	12	1	1	5	9	13	9	11	7	14	OUT	OUT	OUT	9.76	12%	8th
2025 MX2	2	13	7	5	7	11	7	3	3	8	1	3	3	4	3	4	3	3	1	4	4.75	50%	4th
2026 MX2	8 ARG (Argentina)	3 AND (Andalusia)	4 SUI (Switzerland)	2 SAR (Sardinia)	1 TRE	7 FRA (France)	2 GER (Germany)	1 LAT (Latvia)	1 ITA (Italy)	3 POR (Portugal)	4 RSA (South Africa)	8 GBR (United Kingdom)	7 CZE (Czech Republic)	6 FLA (Flanders)	1 SWE (Sweden)	4 NED (Netherlands)	15 TUR (Turkey)	11 CHN (China)	5 AUS (Australia)	-	4.89	42%	3rd
