= 2026 Motocross des Nations =

2026 edition of Motocross des Nations

The 2026 Motocross des Nations was a Motocross race held on 3 and 4 October 2026 at Ernée in Northern France.

This was the fourth time that the track in the Mayenne department had held the event and the eleventh time that the event had taken place in France.

Australia went into the event as the reigning champions, after taking their second victory at the 2025 edition. With the Lawrence brothers opting to not compete in the event, Australia was without its star riders and would subsequently finish ninth.

Belgium would take the overall win, their first since 2013 and their sixteenth overall, with a young team composed of Lucas Coenen, Sacha Coenen and Liam Everts. The Coenen's would become the first twins to win the event and Everts joined his father and grandfather as members of winning Belgian teams.

Spain, finishing second, would record their first ever podium finish in the events history. The Netherlands finished third, with Jeffrey Herlings winning both of his races to be the best individual rider.

== Entry list ==
Start numbers were allocated based on the team finishes from the 2025 competition. This allocated number plates 1, 2 & 3 to Australia (1st), 4, 5 & 6 to United States (2nd) and 7, 8 & 9 to France (3rd).

	Country	Nr	Rider	Class	Motorcycle
1	Australia	1	Jed Beaton	MXGP	Yamaha
1	Australia	2	Alex Larwood	MX2	Honda
1	Australia	3	Aaron Tanti	Open	Yamaha
2	United States	4	Julien Beaumer	MXGP	KTM
2	United States	5	Levi Kitchen	MX2	Kawasaki
2	United States	6	Cooper Webb	Open	Husqvarna
3	France	7	Romain Febvre	MXGP	Kawasaki
3	France	8	Mathis Valin	MX2	Kawasaki
3	France	9	Tom Vialle	Open	Honda
4	Belgium	10	Lucas Coenen	MXGP	KTM
4	Belgium	11	Sacha Coenen	MX2	KTM
4	Belgium	12	Liam Everts	Open	Husqvarna
5	Slovenia	13	Jan Pancar	MXGP	KTM
5	Slovenia	14	Jaka Peklaj	MX2	Husqvarna
5	Slovenia	15	Lukas Osek	Open	KTM
6	Italy	16	Alberto Forato	MXGP	Fantic
6	Italy	17	Ferruccio Zanchi	MX2	Ducati
6	Italy	18	Andrea Adamo	Open	KTM
7	Sweden	19	Isak Gifting	MXGP	Yamaha
7	Sweden	20	Alve Callemo	MX2	Husqvarna
7	Sweden	21	Alvin Östlund	Open	Triumph
8	Switzerland	22	Valentin Guillod	MXGP	Yamaha
8	Switzerland	23	Jeremy Seewer	MX2	KTM
8	Switzerland	24	Kevin Brumann	Open	Husqvarna
9	Latvia	25	Kārlis Reišulis	MXGP	Yamaha
9	Latvia	26	Jānis Reišulis	MX2	Yamaha
9	Latvia	27	Pauls Jonass	Open	Kawasaki
10	Spain	28	Jorge Prado	MXGP	KTM
10	Spain	29	Guillem Farrés	MX2	Triumph
10	Spain	30	Francisco García	Open	Kawasaki
11	Japan	31	Kainosuke Oshiro	MXGP	Yamaha
11	Japan	32	Haruki Yokoyama	MX2	Kawasaki
11	Japan	33	Yuki Okura	Open	Honda
12	Brazil	34	Fábio Santos	MXGP	Yamaha
12	Brazil	35	Guilherme Bresolín	MX2	Kawasaki
12	Brazil	36	Enzo Lopes	Open	Honda
13	Estonia	37	Jörgen-Matthias Talviku	MXGP	Fantic
13	Estonia	38	Sebastian Leok	MX2	Husqvarna
13	Estonia	39	Kaarel Tilk	Open	Husqvarna
14	South Africa	40	Slade Smith	MXGP	Yamaha
14	South Africa	41	Camden McLellan	MX2	Triumph
14	South Africa	42	Trey Cox	Open	KTM
15	Germany	43	Tom Koch	MXGP	KTM
15	Germany	44	Valentin Kees	MX2	KTM
15	Germany	45	Noah Ludwig	Open	KTM
16	United Kingdom	46	Taylor Hammal	MXGP	Kawasaki
16	United Kingdom	47	Ben Mustoe	MX2	Gas Gas
16	United Kingdom	48	Ben Watson	Open	Triumph
17	Norway	52	Leander Bech-Thunshelle	MXGP	Honda
17	Norway	53	Pelle Gundersen	MX2	Husqvarna
17	Norway	54	Sander Agard-Michelsen	Open	Yamaha
18	Netherlands	55	Roan van de Moosdijk	MXGP	KTM
18	Netherlands	56	Glenn Coldenhoff	MX2	Yamaha
18	Netherlands	57	Jeffrey Herlings	Open	Honda
19	Denmark	58	Mads Fredsøe	MXGP	KTM
19	Denmark	59	Nicolai Skovbjerg	MX2	Husqvarna
19	Denmark	60	Mikkel Haarup	Open	Triumph
20	Austria	61	Michael Kratzer	MXGP	Honda
20	Austria	62	Ricardo Bauer	MX2	KTM
20	Austria	63	Michael Sandner	Open	Husqvarna
21	Canada	64	Tanner Ward	MXGP	Gas Gas
21	Canada	65	Dylan Rempel	MX2	Honda
21	Canada	66	Dylan Wright	Open	Honda
22	Finland	67	Emil Weckman	MXGP	Triumph
22	Finland	68	Saku Mansikkamäki	MX2	KTM
22	Finland	69	Jere Haavisto	Open	KTM
23	(Republic of Ireland) Ireland	85	Lennox Dickinson	MXGP	Honda
23	(Republic of Ireland) Ireland	86	Glenn McCormick	MX2	KTM
23	(Republic of Ireland) Ireland	87	Jason Meara	Open	Yamaha
24	FIM Latin America	88	(Argentina) Joaquín Poli	MXGP	Kawasaki
24	FIM Latin America	89	(Venezuela) Carlos Badiali	MX2	Yamaha
24	FIM Latin America	90	(Costa Rica) Fabricio Chacón	Open	Yamaha
25	Morocco	91	Maxime Simon	MXGP	Honda
25	Morocco	92	Saad Soulimani	MX2	TM
25	Morocco	93	Noam Jayal	Open	Kawasaki
26	Mexico	97	Jorge Rubalcava	MXGP	KTM
26	Mexico	98	Fernando Velázquez	MX2	Triumph
26	Mexico	99	Erick Vázquez	Open	Ducati
27	Iceland	100	Ingvar Sverrir Einarsson	MXGP	Gas Gas
27	Iceland	101	Eric Máni Guðmundsson	MX2	KTM
27	Iceland	102	Tristan Berg Árason	Open	Yamaha
28	Ukraine	103	Roman Morozov	MXGP	Yamaha
28	Ukraine	104	Ostap Andrukh	MX2	Gas Gas
28	Ukraine	105	Mykhailo Vasko	Open	Husqvarna
29	Czech Republic	115	Petr Rathouský	MXGP	KTM
29	Czech Republic	116	David Widerwill	MX2	Gas Gas
29	Czech Republic	117	Václav Kovář	Open	KTM
30	Croatia	118	Matija Kelava	MXGP	Yamaha
30	Croatia	119	Šimun Ivandić	MX2	Yamaha
30	Croatia	120	Matej Jaroš	Open	Kawasaki
31	Slovakia	121	Tomáš Kohút	MXGP	KTM
31	Slovakia	122	Jaroslav Katriňák	MX2	Husqvarna
31	Slovakia	123	Pavol Repčák	Open	KTM
32	Lithuania	124	Domantas Jazdauskas	MXGP	KTM
32	Lithuania	125	Marius Adomaitis	MX2	Husqvarna
32	Lithuania	126	Erlandas Mackonis	Open	Yamaha

== Qualifying Races ==
Qualifying is run on a class by class basis. Top 19 countries after qualifying go directly to the main Motocross des Nations races. The remaining countries go to a smaller final. Best 2 scores count.

=== MXGP ===
Place	Nr	Rider	Motorcycle	Laps	Gap
1	28	(Spain) Jorge Prado	KTM	12	
2	7	(France) Romain Febvre	Kawasaki	12	+1.923
3	13	(Slovenia) Jan Pancar	KTM	12	+37.588
4	16	(Italy) Alberto Forato	Fantic	12	+40.359
5	10	(Belgium) Lucas Coenen	KTM	12	+45.248
6	1	(Australia) Jed Beaton	Yamaha	12	+50.039
7	37	(Estonia) Jörgen-Matthias Talviku	Fantic	12	+1:05.687
8	25	(Latvia) Kārlis Reišulis	Yamaha	12	+1:20.043
9	46	(United Kingdom) Taylor Hammal	Kawasaki	12	+1:22.858
10	55	(Netherlands) Roan van de Moosdijk	KTM	12	+1:27.086
11	22	(Switzerland) Valentin Guillod	Yamaha	12	+1:47.037
12	58	(Denmark) Mads Fredsøe	KTM	12	+1:52.215
13	19	(Sweden) Isak Gifting	Yamaha	12	+1:55.079
14	4	(United States) Julien Beaumer	KTM	12	+2:00.564
15	43	(Germany) Tom Koch	KTM	12	+2:03.003
16	64	(Canada) Tanner Ward	Husqvarna	11	+1 Lap
17	121	(Slovakia) Tomáš Kohút	KTM	11	+1 Lap
18	31	(Japan) Kainosuke Oshiro	Yamaha	11	+1 Lap
19	34	(Brazil) Fábio Santos	Yamaha	11	+1 Lap
20	67	(Finland) Emil Weckman	Triumph	11	+1 Lap
21	61	(Austria) Michael Kratzer	Honda	11	+1 Lap
22	115	(Czech Republic) Petr Rathouský	KTM	11	+1 Lap
23	85	(Republic of Ireland) Lennox Dickinson	Honda	11	+1 Lap
24	40	(South Africa) Slade Smith	Yamaha	11	+1 Lap
25	52	(Norway) Leander Thunshelle	Honda	11	+1 Lap
26	88	(Argentina) Joaquín Poli	Kawasaki	11	+1 Lap
27	124	(Lithuania) Domantas Jazdauskas	KTM	11	+1 Lap
28	118	(Croatia) Matija Kelava	Yamaha	11	+1 Lap
29	97	(Mexico) Jorge Rubalcava	KTM	10	+2 Laps
30	100	(Iceland) Ingvar Sverrir Einarsson	Gas Gas	10	+2 Laps
31	103	(Ukraine) Roman Morozov	Yamaha	6	Did Not Finish
32	91	(Morocco) Maxime Simon	Honda	2	Did Not Finish

=== MX2 ===
Place	Nr	Rider	Motorcycle	Laps	Gap
1	8	(France) Mathis Valin	Kawasaki	12	
2	41	(South Africa) Camden McLellan	Triumph	12	+6.159
3	5	(United States) Levi Kitchen	Kawasaki	12	+18.989
4	29	(Spain) Guillem Farrés	Triumph	12	+20.331
5	26	(Latvia) Jānis Reišulis	Yamaha	12	+33.764
6	23	(Switzerland) Jeremy Seewer	KTM	12	+40.550
7	11	(Belgium) Sacha Coenen	KTM	12	+45.439
8	17	(Italy) Ferruccio Zanchi	Ducati	12	+49.378
9	56	(Netherlands) Glenn Coldenhoff	Yamaha	12	+58.744
10	2	(Australia) Alex Larwood	Honda	12	+59.325
11	59	(Denmark) Nicolai Skovbjerg	Husqvarna	12	+1:11.228
12	20	(Sweden) Alve Callemo	Husqvarna	12	+1:29.165
13	62	(Austria) Ricardo Bauer	KTM	12	+1:41.431
14	38	(Estonia) Sebastian Leok	Husqvarna	12	+1:56.764
15	65	(Canada) Dylan Rempel	Honda	12	+1:41.013
16	47	(United Kingdom) Ben Mustoe	Gas Gas	12	+2:00.317
17	53	(Norway) Pelle Gundersen	Husqvarna	12	+2:08.991
18	35	(Brazil) Guilherme Bresolin	Kawasaki	11	+1 Lap
19	44	(Germany) Valentin Kees	KTM	11	+1 Lap
20	32	(Japan) Haruki Yokoyama	Kawasaki	11	+1 Lap
21	86	(Republic of Ireland) Glenn McCormick	KTM	11	+1 Lap
22	68	(Finland) Saku Mansikkamäki	KTM	11	+1 Lap
23	116	(Czech Republic) David Widerwill	Gas Gas	11	+1 Lap
24	125	(Lithuania) Marius Adomaitis	Husqvarna	11	+1 Lap
25	92	(Morocco) Saad Soulimani	TM	11	+1 Lap
26	14	(Slovenia) Jaka Peklaj	Husqvarna	11	+1 Lap
27	122	(Slovakia) Jaroslav Katriňák	Husqvarna	11	+1 Lap
28	89	(Venezuela) Carlos Badiali	Yamaha	11	+1 Lap
29	119	(Croatia) Šimun Ivandić	Yamaha	11	+1 Lap
30	101	(Iceland) Eric Máni Guðmundsson	KTM	10	+2 Laps
31	104	(Ukraine) Ostap Andrukh	Gas Gas	10	+2 Laps
32	98	(Mexico) Fernando Velázquez	Triumph	9	+3 Laps

=== Open ===
Place	Nr	Rider	Motorcycle	Laps	Gap
1	57	(Netherlands) Jeffrey Herlings	Honda	12	
2	12	(Belgium) Liam Everts	Husqvarna	12	+19.625
3	9	(France) Tom Vialle	Honda	12	+43.237
4	18	(Italy) Andrea Adamo	KTM	12	+49.072
5	27	(Latvia) Pauls Jonass	Kawasaki	12	+52.382
6	30	(Spain) Francisco García	Kawasaki	12	+57.044
7	6	(United States) Cooper Webb	Husqvarna	12	+58.140
8	45	(Germany) Noah Ludwig	KTM	12	+1:21.780
9	24	(Switzerland) Kevin Brumann	Husqvarna	12	1:29.576
10	48	(United Kingdom) Ben Watson	Triumph	12	+1:32.659
11	66	(Canada) Dylan Wright	Honda	12	+1:34.812
12	3	(Australia) Aaron Tanti	Yamaha	12	+1:37.574
13	21	(Sweden) Alvin Östlund	Triumph	12	+1:43.374
14	36	(Brazil) Enzo Lopes	Honda	11	+1 Lap
15	69	(Finland) Jere Haavisto	KTM	11	+1 Lap
16	117	(Czech Republic) Václav Kovář	KTM	11	+1 Lap
17	39	(Estonia) Kaarel Tilk	Husqvarna	11	+1 Lap
18	123	(Slovakia) Pavol Repčák	KTM	11	+1 Lap
19	54	(Norway) Sander Agard-Michelsen	Yamaha	11	+1 Lap
20	63	(Austria) Michael Sandner	Husqvarna	11	+1 Lap
21	87	(Republic of Ireland) Jason Meara	Yamaha	11	+1 Lap
22	126	(Lithuania) Erlandas Mackonis	Yamah	11	+1 Lap
23	42	(South Africa) Trey Cox	KTM	11	+1 Lap
24	15	(Slovenia) Lukas Osek	KTM	11	+1 Lap
25	90	(Costa Rica) Fabricio Chacón	Yamaha	11	+1 Lap
26	99	(Mexico) Erick Vázquez	Ducati	10	+2 Laps
27	93	(Morocco) Noam Jayal	Kawasaki	10	+2 Laps
28	102	(Iceland) Tristan Berg Árason	Yamaha	9	+3 Laps
29	105	(Ukraine) Mykhailo Vasko	Husqvarna	8	+4 Laps
30	120	(Croatia) Matej Jaroš	Kawasaki	4	Did Not Finish
31	33	(Japan) Yuki Okura	Honda	2	Did Not Finish
	60	(Denmark) Mikkel Haarup	Triumph	0	Did Not Start

=== Qualification Standings ===
- Qualified Nations

Place	Nation	Points
1	France	3
2	Spain	5
3	Belgium	7
4	Italy	8
5	Latvia	10
6	Netherlands	10
7	United States	10
8	Switzerland	15
9	Australia	16
10	United Kingdom	19
11	Estonia	21
12	Germany	23
13	Denmark	23
14	Sweden	25
15	South Africa	25
16	Canada	26
17	Slovenia	27
18	Brazil	32
19	Austria	33

- Nations admitted to the B-Final

Place	Nation	Points
20	Finland	35
21	Slovakia	35
22	Norway	36
23	Czech Republic	38
24	Japan	38
25	Ireland	42
26	Lithuania	46
27	FIM Latin America	51
28	Morocco	52
29	Mexico	55
30	Croatia	57
31	Iceland	58
32	Ukraine	60

== B-Final ==
The B-Final is for the nations who finished 20th-32nd in qualifying. The top nation from the B-Final qualify for the main Motocross des Nations races, the remaining are eliminated. Best 2 scores for each nation counts.

=== Race ===
Place	Nr	Rider	Motorcycle	Laps	Gap
1	69	(Finland) Jere Haavisto	KTM	12	
2	123	(Slovakia) Pavol Repčák	KTM	12	+16.040
3	31	(Japan) Kainosuke Oshiro	Yamaha	12	+22.594
4	117	(Czech Republic) Václav Kovář	KTM	12	+26.161
5	121	(Slovakia) Tomáš Kohút	KTM	12	+28.457
6	115	(Czech Republic) Petr Rathouský	KTM	12	+31.528
7	92	(Morocco) Saad Soulimani	TM	12	+33.231
8	32	(Japan) Haruki Yokoyama	Kawasaki	12	+38.558
9	54	(Norway) Sander Agard-Michelsen	Yamaha	12	+39.204
10	53	(Norway) Pelle Gundersen	Husqvarna	12	+45.202
11	85	(Republic of Ireland) Lennox Dickinson	Honda	12	+46.715
12	68	(Finland) Saku Mansikkamäki	KTM	12	+56.960
13	88	(Argentina) Joaquín Poli	Kawasaki	12	+1:02.194
14	86	(Republic of Ireland) Glenn McCormick	KTM	12	+1:04.682
15	86	(Republic of Ireland) Jason Meara	Yamaha	12	+1:08.208
16	125	(Lithuania) Marius Adomaitis	Husqvarna	12	+1:09.942
17	52	(Norway) Leander Thunshelle	Honda	12	+1:33.602
18	122	(Slovakia) Jaroslav Katriňák	Husqvarna	12	+1:35.982
19	118	(Croatia) Matija Kelava	Yamaha	12	+1:36.544
20	116	(Czech Republic) David Widerwill	Gas Gas	12	+1:45.556
21	126	(Lithuania) Erlandas Mackonis	Yamaha	12	+1:54.897
22	119	(Croatia) Šimun Ivandić	Yamaha	12	+2:09.721
23	90	(Costa Rica) Fabricio Chacón	Yamaha	11	+1 Lap
24	97	(Mexico) Jorge Rubalcava	KTM	11	+1 Lap
25	120	(Croatia) Matej Jaroš	Kawasaki	11	+1 Lap
26	93	(Morocco) Noam Jayal	Kawasaki	11	+1 Lap
27	103	(Ukraine) Roman Morozov	Yamaha	11	+1 Lap
28	102	(Iceland) Tristan Berg Árason	Yamaha	10	+2 Laps
29	100	(Iceland) Ingvar Sverrir Einarsson	Gas Gas	10	+2 Laps
30	104	(Ukraine) Ostap Andrukh	Gas Gas	10	+2 Laps
31	91	(Morocco) Maxime Simon	Honda	10	+2 Laps
32	99	(Mexico) Erick Vázquez	Ducati	10	+2 Laps
33	98	(Mexico) Fernando Velázquez	Triumph	10	+2 Laps
34	105	(Ukraine) Mykhailo Vasko	Husqvarna	9	+3 Laps
35	67	(Finland) Emil Weckman	Triumph	6	Did Not Finish
36	101	(Iceland) Eric Máni Guðmundsson	KTM	5	Did Not Finish
37	89	(Venezuela) Carlos Badiali	Yamaha	1	Did Not Finish
	33	(Japan) Yuki Okura	Honda	0	Did Not Start
	124	(Lithuania) Domantas Jazdauskas	KTM	0	Did Not Start

=== B-Final Standings ===
- Slovakia qualify for the main races.

Place	Nation	Points
1	Slovakia	7
2	Czech Republic	10
3	Japan	11
4	Finland	13
5	Norway	19
6	Ireland	25
7	Morocco	33
8	FIM Latin America	36
9	Lithuania	37
10	Croatia	41
11	Mexico	56
12	Ukraine	57
13	Iceland	57

== Motocross des Nations races ==
The main Motocross des Nations races consist of 3 races which combine two classes together in each. Lowest score wins with each nation allowed to drop their worst score after the final race.

=== MXGP+MX2 ===
Place	Nr	Rider	Motorcycle	Laps	Gap
1	7	(France) Romain Febvre	Kawasaki	18	
2	28	(Spain) Jorge Prado	KTM	18	+9.830
3	10	(Belgium) Lucas Coenen	KTM	18	+16.389
4	29	(Spain) Guillem Farrés	Triumph	18	+27.358
5	13	(Slovenia) Jan Pancar	KTM	18	+33.338
6	16	(Italy) Alberto Forato	Fantic	18	+35.212
7	41	(South Africa) Camden McLellan	Triumph	18	+42.267
8	37	(Estonia) Jörgen-Matthias Talviku	Fantic	18	+45.663
9	55	(Netherlands) Roan van de Moosdijk	KTM	18	+1:09.544
10	4	(United States) Julien Beaumer	KTM	18	+1:13.310
11	1	(Australia) Jed Beaton	Yamaha	18	+1:15.748
12	11	(Belgium) Sacha Coenen	KTM	18	+1:22.342
13	25	(Latvia) Kārlis Reišulis	Yamaha	18	+1:30.835
14	56	(Netherlands) Glenn Coldenhoff	Yamaha	18	+1:32.215
15	23	(Switzerland) Jeremy Seewer	KTM	18	+1:36.327
16	46	(United Kingdom) Taylor Hammal	Kawasaki	18	+1:45.490
17	58	(Denmark) Mads Fredsøe	KTM	18	+1:47.277
18	59	(Denmark) Nicolai Skovbjerg	Husqvarna	18	+1:49.644
19	43	(Germany) Tom Koch	KTM	18	+1:52.109
20	26	(Latvia) Jānis Reišulis	Yamaha	18	+1:54.236
21	2	(Australia) Alex Larwood	Honda	17	+1 Lap
22	22	(Switzerland) Valentin Guillod	Yamaha	17	+1 Lap
23	47	(United Kingdom) Ben Mustoe	Gas Gas	17	+1 Lap
24	20	(Sweden) Alve Callemo	Husqvarna	17	+1 Lap
25	5	(United States) Levi Kitchen	Kawasaki	17	+1 Lap
26	34	(Brazil) Fábio Santos	Yamaha	17	+1 Lap
27	121	(Slovakia) Tomáš Kohút	KTM	17	+1 Lap
28	44	(Germany) Valentin Kees	KTM	17	+1 Lap
29	35	(Brazil) Guilherme Bresolin	Kawasaki	17	+1 Lap
30	64	(Canada) Tanner Ward	Husqvarna	17	+1 Lap
31	62	(Austria) Ricardo Bauer	KTM	17	+1 Lap
32	17	(Italy) Ferruccio Zanchi	Ducati	17	+1 Lap
33	61	(Austria) Michael Kratzer	Honda	17	+1 Lap
34	40	(South Africa) Slade Smith	Yamaha	17	+1 Lap
35	122	(Slovakia) Jaroslav Katriňák	Husqvarna	17	+1 Lap
36	38	(Estonia) Sebastian Leok	Husqvarna	16	+2 Laps
37	14	(Slovenia) Jaka Peklaj	Husqvarna	16	+2 Laps
38	19	(Sweden) Isak Gifting	Yamaha	4	Did Not Finish
39	65	(Canada) Dylan Rempel	Honda	2	Did Not Finish
40	8	(France) Mathis Valin	Kawasaki	0	Did Not Finish

=== Nations standings after Race 1 ===
Place	Nation	Points
1	Spain	6
2	Belgium	15
3	Netherlands	23
4	Australia	32
5	Latvia	33
6	United States	35
7	Denmark	35
8	Switzerland	37
9	Italy	38
10	United Kingdom	39
11	France	41
12	South Africa	41
13	Slovenia	42
14	Estonia	44
15	Germany	47
16	Brazil	55
17	Sweden	62
18	Slovakia	62
19	Austria	64
20	Canada	69

=== MX2+Open ===
Place	Nr	Rider	Motorcycle	Laps	Gap
1	57	(Netherlands) Jeffrey Herlings	Honda	18	
2	18	(Italy) Andrea Adamo	KTM	18	+35.882
3	27	(Latvia) Pauls Jonass	Kawasaki	18	+37.080
4	12	(Belgium) Liam Everts	Husqvarna	18	+37.456
5	29	(Spain) Guillem Farrés	Triumph	18	+51.889
6	6	(United States) Cooper Webb	Husqvarna	18	+53.040
7	11	(Belgium) Sacha Coenen	KTM	18	+1:01.419
8	41	(South Africa) Camden McLellan	Triumph	18	+1:08.838
9	56	(Netherlands) Glenn Coldenhoff	Yamaha	18	+1:15.954
10	48	(United Kingdom) Ben Watson	Triumph	18	+1:17.630
11	8	(France) Mathis Valin	Kawasaki	18	+1:22.851
12	26	(Latvia) Jānis Reišulis	Yamaha	18	+1:26.142
13	23	(Switzerland) Jeremy Seewer	KTM	18	+1:28.064
14	5	(United States) Levi Kitchen	Kawasaki	18	+1:32.634
15	24	(Switzerland) Kevin Brumann	Husqvarna	18	+1:48.476
16	66	(Canada) Dylan Wright	Honda	18	+1:51.299
17	17	(Italy) Ferruccio Zanchi	Ducati	18	+1:51.791
18	36	(Brazil) Enzo Lopes	Honda	18	+2:11.518
19	21	(Sweden) Alvin Östlund	Triumph	17	+1 Lap
20	20	(Sweden) Alve Callemo	Husqvarna	17	+1 Lap
21	2	(Australia) Alex Larwood	Honda	17	+1 Lap
22	65	(Canada) Dylan Rempel	Honda	17	+1 Lap
23	38	(Estonia) Sebastian Leok	Husqvarna	17	+1 Lap
24	47	(United Kingdom) Ben Mustoe	Gas Gas	17	+1 Lap
25	35	(Brazil) Guilherme Bresolin	Kawasaki	17	+1 Lap
26	39	(Estonia) Kaarel Tilk	Husqvarna	17	+1 Lap
27	44	(Germany) Valentin Kees	KTM	17	+1 Lap
28	63	(Austria) Michael Sandner	Husqvarna	17	+1 Lap
29	62	(Austria) Ricardo Bauer	KTM	17	+1 Lap
30	122	(Slovakia) Jaroslav Katriňák	Husqvarna	16	+2 Laps
31	14	(Slovenia) Jaka Peklaj	Husqvarna	16	+2 Laps
32	42	(South Africa) Trey Cox	KTM	16	+2 Laps
33	15	(Slovenia) Lukas Osek	KTM	16	+2 Laps
34	59	(Denmark) Nicolai Skovbjerg	Husqvarna	13	Did Not Finish
35	123	(Slovakia) Pavol Repčák	KTM	11	Did Not Finish
36	30	(Spain) Francisco García	Kawasaki	1	Did Not Finish
37	3	(Australia) Aaron Tanti	Yamaha	0	Did Not Finish
38	9	(France) Tom Vialle	Honda	0	Did Not Finish
39	45	(Germany) Noah Ludwig	KTM	0	Did Not Finish
	60	(Denmark) Mikkel Haarup	Triumph	0	Did Not Start

=== Nations standings after Race 2 ===
Place	Nation	Points
1	Belgium	26
2	Netherlands	33
3	Spain	47
4	Latvia	48
5	United States	55
6	Italy	57
7	Switzerland	65
8	United Kingdom	73
9	South Africa	81
10	France	90
11	Australia	90
12	Estonia	93
13	Brazil	98
14	Sweden	101
15	Slovenia	106
16	Canada	107
17	Germany	113
18	Austria	121
19	Slovakia	127
20	Denmark	69

=== MXGP+Open ===
Place	Nr	Rider	Motorcycle	Laps	Gap
1	57	(Netherlands) Jeffrey Herlings	Honda	18	
2	28	(Spain) Jorge Prado	KTM	18	+12.035
3	7	(France) Romain Febvre	Kawasaki	18	+18.557
4	12	(Belgium) Liam Everts	Husqvarna	18	+24.337
5	10	(Belgium) Lucas Coenen	KTM	18	+31.256
6	6	(United States) Cooper Webb	Husqvarna	18	+35.428
7	13	(Slovenia) Jan Pancar	KTM	18	+47.080
8	27	(Latvia) Pauls Jonass	Kawasaki	18	+54.800
9	48	(United Kingdom) Ben Watson	Triumph	18	+1:05.836
10	1	(Australia) Jed Beaton	Yamaha	18	+1:11.065
11	19	(Sweden) Isak Gifting	Yamaha	18	+1:16.976
12	16	(Italy) Alberto Forato	Fantic	18	+1:18.540
13	30	(Spain) Francisco García	Kawasaki	18	+1:18.866
14	43	(Germany) Tom Koch	KTM	18	+1:32.565
15	66	(Canada) Dylan Wright	Honda	18	+1:43.627
16	25	(Latvia) Kārlis Reišulis	Yamaha	18	+1:48.323
17	4	(United States) Julien Beaumer	KTM	18	+1:50.098
18	55	(Netherlands) Roan van de Moosdijk	KTM	18	+1:51.863
19	24	(Switzerland) Kevin Brumann	Husqvarna	18	+1:52.657
20	22	(Switzerland) Valentin Guillod	Yamaha	18	+1:55.251
21	21	(Sweden) Alvin Östlund	Triumph	17	+1 Lap
22	123	(Slovakia) Pavol Repčák	KTM	17	+1 Lap
23	37	(Estonia) Jörgen-Matthias Talviku	Husqvarna	17	+1 Lap
24	3	(Australia) Aaron Tanti	Yamaha	17	+1 Lap
25	58	(Denmark) Mads Fredsøe	KTM	17	+1 Lap
26	63	(Austria) Michael Sandner	Husqvarna	17	+1 Lap
27	64	(Canada) Tanner Ward	Husqvarna	17	+1 Lap
28	121	(Slovakia) Tomáš Kohút	KTM	17	+1 Lap
29	39	(Estonia) Kaarel Tilk	Husqvarna	17	+1 Lap
30	46	(United Kingdom) Taylor Hammal	Kawasaki	17	+1 Lap
31	61	(Austria) Michael Kratzer	Honda	17	+1 Lap
32	40	(South Africa) Slade Smith	Yamaha	17	+1 Lap
33	42	(South Africa) Trey Cox	KTM	17	+1 Lap
34	15	(Slovenia) Lukas Osek	KTM	16	+2 Laps
35	34	(Brazil) Fábio Santos	Yamaha	15	+3 Laps
36	18	(Italy) Andrea Adamo	KTM	12	Did Not Finish
37	9	(France) Tom Vialle	Honda	6	Did Not Finish
38	36	(Brazil) Enzo Lopes	Honda	0	Did Not Finish
	45	(Germany) Noah Ludwig	KTM	0	Did Not Start
	60	(Denmark) Mikkel Haarup	Triumph	0	Did Not Start

=== Nations standings after Race 3 ===
Place	Nation	Points
1	Belgium	23
2	Spain	26
3	Netherlands	34
4	Latvia	52
5	United States	53
6	Italy	69
7	United Kingdom	82
8	Switzerland	82
9	Australia	87
10	France	90
11	Sweden	95
12	Estonia	109
13	Slovenia	110
14	Canada	110
15	South Africa	112
16	Germany	127
17	Brazil	133
18	Slovakia	142
19	Austria	145
20	Denmark	94

== Final standings ==
Place	Nation	Points	Total	Change
1	Belgium	3 + 4 + 4 + 5 + 7	23	+3
2	Spain	2 + 2 + 4 + 5 + 13	26	+8
3	Netherlands	1 + 1 + 9 + 9 + 14	34	+16
4	Latvia	3 + 8 + 12 + 13 + 16	52	+5
5	United States	6 + 6 + 10 + 14 + 17	53	-3
6	Italy	2 + 6 + 12 + 17 + 32	69	-
7	United Kingdom	9 + 10 + 16 + 23 + 24	82	+9
8	Switzerland	13 + 15 + 15 + 19 + 20	82	-
9	Australia	10 + 11 + 21 + 21 + 24	87	-8
10	France	1 + 3 + 11 + 37 + 38	90	-7
11	Sweden	11 + 19 + 20 + 21 + 24	95	-4
12	Estonia	8 + 23 + 23 + 26 + 29	109	+1
13	Slovenia	5 + 7 + 31 + 33 + 34	110	-8
14	Canada	15 + 16 + 22 + 27 + 30	110	+8
15	South Africa	7 + 8 + 32 + 32 + 33	112	-1
16	Germany	14 + 19 + 27 + 28 + 39	127	-1
17	Brazil	18 + 25 + 26 + 29 + 35	133	-5
18	Slovakia	22 + 27 + 28 + 30 + 35	142	*
19	Austria	26 + 28 + 29 + 31 + 31	145	+2
20	Denmark	17 + 18 + 25 + 34	94	-
21	Czech Republic			*
22	Japan			-11
23	Finland			-
24	Norway			-6
25	Ireland			+4
26	Morocco			+5
27	FIM Latin America			+3
28	Lithuania			*
29	Croatia			*
30	Mexico			+3
31	Ukraine			+4
32	Iceland			+2
