= Lucas Coenen =

Belgian motocross racer

- Nationality: (Belgium) Belgian
- Born: 9 November 2006 (age 19) Belgium

Motocross career
- Years active: 2022–present
- Teams: •Nestaan Husqvarna Factory Racing (2022–2024); •Red Bull KTM De Carli Racing Team (2024-Present)
- Wins: •MX2: 10; •MXGP: 11
- GP debut: 2022, GP of Czech Republic, MX2
- First GP win: 2023, GP of Sumbawa, MX2

Lucas Coenen (born 9 November 2006) is a Belgian professional Motocross racer. Coenen has competed in the Motocross World Championship since 2022 in the MX2 class and from 2025 has competed in the MXGP class.

In his debut season in the MXGP class, Coenen was able to finish as runner-up to eventual champion Romain Febvre, winning six Grand Prix in the process. In 2026, Coenen was leading the MXGP championship at the halfway stage but an injury at a round of the AMA Motocross Championship derailed his season.

After a season-long battle with his teammate Kay de Wolf, Coenen finished second in the MX2 class of the 2024 FIM Motocross World Championship. He won nine overall Grand Prix in the 2024 season, the highest of any rider in the MX2 class.

Coenen has represented his country at the Motocross des Nations on four occasions. He was part of the winning Belgian team at the 2026 event, taking the nations first win at the event for thirteen years.

Coenen is the twin brother of Sacha Coenen, who is also a World Championship-level motocross racer.

== Career ==
=== Junior career ===
Coenen made his debut in the European Motocross Championship in 2016 within the 65cc class where he scored a point in the first race. He returned to this class the following season, with a sixth in race once giving him thirteenth overall. By 2019, Coenen, along with his brother, had progressed to the 85 class. He scored points in both the European and World Championships for his class that season.

For the 2021 European Motocross Championship, Coenen made his full time move to the EMX125 class after being signed by BUD Racing Kawasaki. Despite his young age, Coenen was able to rapidly adapt to the class. By round three he was able to finish on the podium for the first time, repeating this at the following round in France. He would go on to win two of the final three rounds of the season and finish an eventual third in the championship. In addition to this, Coenen was crowned champion in the Junior class of the French Elite Motocross Championship.

=== 250 Career ===
Following his strong performance in 2021, Coenen was signed up by the Jumbo Husqvarna BT Racing Team to move straight up to the EMX250 class. Coenen was again able to make an instant impact on the class, finishing second overall at round two. As the season wore on, Coenen became a dominant force in the class, winning three of the last four rounds and seven out of the eight races within that. Coupled with these results, Coenen made his MX2 World Championship debut in the Czech Republic, scoring points in the second race.

Coenen was signed by the Nestaan Husqvarna Factory Racing Team for the 2023 FIM Motocross World Championship season in the MX2 class. He made an immediate impact on the class, recording multiple top-tens in the opening rounds. By round seven, he was able to take his first world championship-level race win at the French Grand Prix. Three rounds later, in Indonesia, Coenen would win both races to take his first overall Grand Prix win. Two more overall podiums followed, including a race win in The Netherlands and despite not starting either races in Sweden, he finished fifth in the final standings in his debut season. Following this, he made his debut at the Motocross des Nations, helping Belgium to fifth overall and picking up the Ricky Carmichael Youngest Rider award individually.

The 2024 FIM Motocross World Championship saw Coenen battle throughout the season with his teammate Kay de Wolf for the title in the MX2 class. The factory Husqvarna riders dominated the season, with Coenen taking nine overall Grand Prix wins, two more than de Wolf. However, greater consistency from de Wolf meant that Coenen finished runner-up in the class by 20 points. Following this, Coenen represented Belgium at the 2024 Motocross des Nations, his second appearance at the event. There was some controversy in the lead up to the event, as Coenen wanted to ride on a 450 in the MXGP class despite finishing runner-up in the MX2 class of the World Championship. With other riders being drafted into the remaining two spots due to injuries, Coenen was asked to ride in the MX2 class which he initially refused to do, causing the team to briefly withdraw from the event. This later changed and he rode in the MX2 class, where he finished second in his qualifying race. In the first main race, Coenen was the leading MX2 rider, battling with many of the MXGP class riders in the top-ten until he crashed and broke his collarbone.

=== 450 Career ===
Despite still being 17 years old, after the 2024 Motocross des Nations it was announced that Coenen would move up to the MXGP class for the 2025 season for the Red Bull KTM Factory team. He started the MXGP season wearing wrist braces and by the third round in France was already able to win his first qualifying race and earn his first overall podium. At the following round in Sardinia, he took his first race win in the MXGP category, before recording back-to-back Grand Prix overall wins in Switzerland and Portugal. With injuries impacting Tim Gajser and Jeffrey Herlings, Coenen was at this point a distant challenger to Romain Febvre. After winning three Grand Prix in a row in Finland, Czech Republic and Belgium, he was able to close the gap down to just nine points. Struggles at the Swedish and Chinese rounds in particular would see the points gap go back out in Febvre's favour, with Coenen eventually ending the season 39 points behind the Frenchman. At the 2025 Motocross des Nations, Coenen raced a 450cc motorcycle in the event for the first time, where Belgium finished fourth overall and he finished second in the first main race.

Coenen, along with his brother, embarked on an ambitious year in 2026, combining his MXGP campaign with selected rounds of the 2026 AMA National Motocross Championship in America. He had a strong start to the year, winning the opening round of the pre-season Italian International Championship, before winning the second round of MXGP in dominant fashion. Following this, Coenen would win four of the next nine overall rounds, with eleven race wins and three qualifying race wins putting him sixty-eight points clear at the top of the standings with eight rounds to go. At his first appearance in America, Coenen impressed by finishing second overall behind reigning champion Jett Lawrence in Colorado. However, at his second appearance in the sand of Southwick, Coenen crashed heavily in the first race and pulled out of the rest of the event. Riding just one week later at the British MXGP round, Coenen crashed again in the qualifying race, causing an injury to his left leg and hip. Following this and despite attempts at the following few rounds, Coenen was unable to line up at any rounds for the rest of the season, causing him to drop to an eventual sixth in the final standings. After months on the side lines, he returned for the 2026 Motocross des Nations, where a third in his qualifying race was followed by a third and fifth in his two main races. These results, combined with those of his brother and Liam Everts, resulted in Belgium winning their first Motocross des Nations crown since 2013.

== Honours ==
Motocross des Nations

- Team Overall: 2026 (Belgium) (gold)
- Ricky Carmichael Motocross of Nations Youngest Rider Award: 2023 (gold)

FIM Motocross World Championship

- MXGP: 2025 (silver)
- MX2: 2024 (silver)

European Motocross Championship

- EMX250: 2022 (silver)
- EMX125: 2021 (bronze)

French Elite Motocross Championship

- Junior: 2021 (gold)

== MXGP Results ==
Year	Rnd 1	Rnd 2	Rnd 3	Rnd 4	Rnd 5	Rnd 6	Rnd 7	Rnd 8	Rnd 9	Rnd 10	Rnd 11	Rnd 12	Rnd 13	Rnd 14	Rnd 15	Rnd 16	Rnd 17	Rnd 18	Rnd 19	Rnd 20	Average Finish	Podium Percent	Place
2023 MX2	14	5	12	8	6	14	4	10	7	1	7	8	2	4	OUT	2	DNF	7	11	-	7.17	18%	5th
2024 MX2	11	4	2	10	10	1	1	1	2	6	3	1	3	7	1	1	7	1	1	1	3.70	65%	2nd
2025 MXGP	6	9	3	7	4	1	1	2	2	2	2	2	1	1	1	8	2	2	12	1	3.45	70%	2nd
2026 MXGP	5	1	8	1	7	2	1	1	2	2	1	DNF	OUT	OUT	OUT	OUT	OUT	OUT	OUT	-	2.81	73%	6th
