= Liam Everts =

Belgian motocross racer (born 2004)

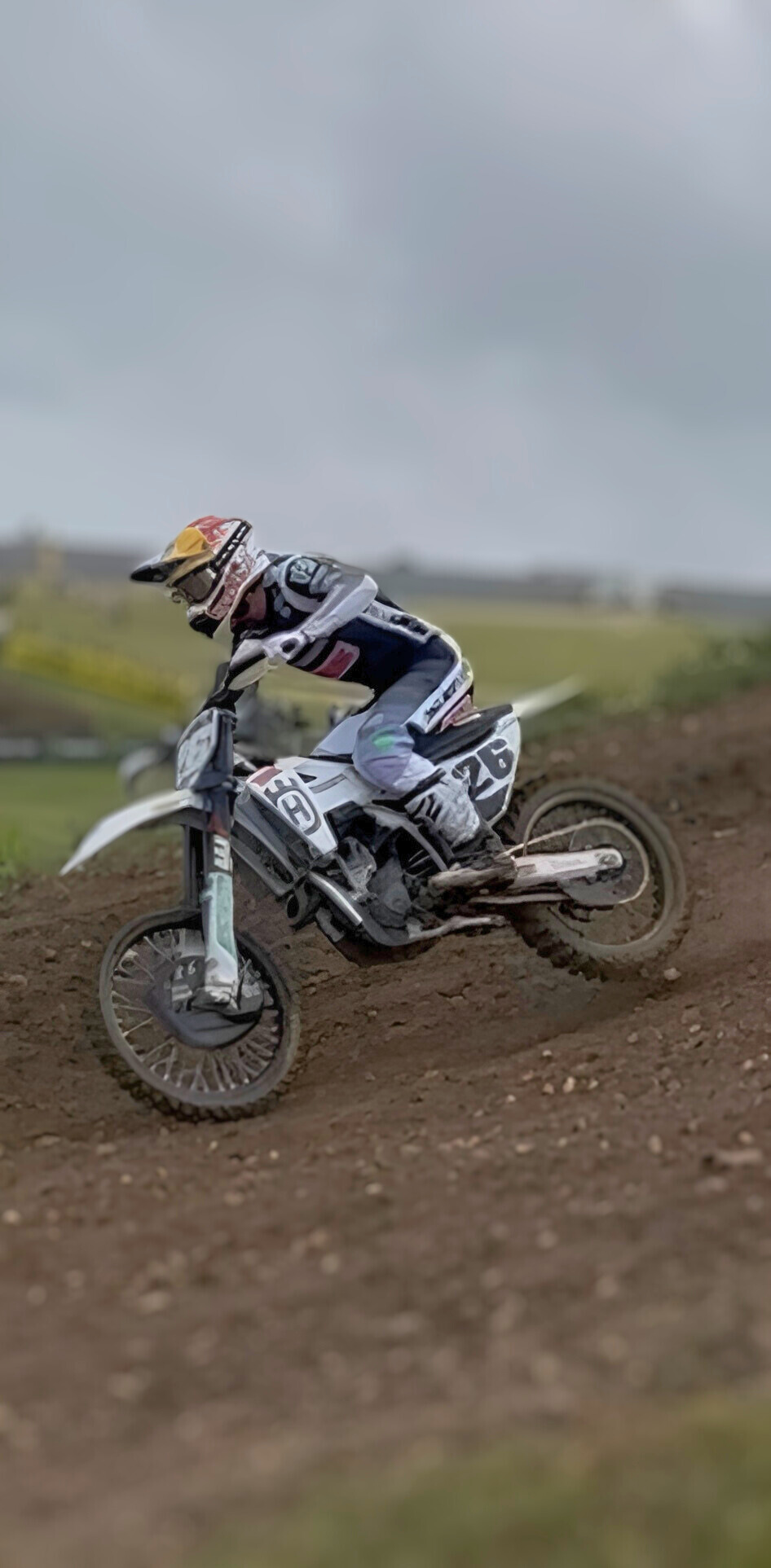
- Everts in 2025
- Nationality: (Belgium) Belgian
- Born: 6 August 2004 (age 22) Hasselt, Belgium

Motocross career
- Years active: 2021–present
- Teams: •Red Bull KTM Factory Racing Team (2022-2024); •Nestaan Husqvarna Factory Racing (2024-present)
- Wins: •MX2: 6
- GP debut: 2021 GP of Sardegna, MX2
- First GP win: 2023 GP of Germany, MX2

Liam Everts (born 6 August 2004) is a Belgian professional Motocross racer. Everts has competed in the Motocross World Championship since 2021 in the MX2 class. Everts was part of the Belgian team that won the 2026 Motocross des Nations.

Everts is the son of ten-time World Champion Stefan Everts and the grandson of four-time World Champion Harry Everts. During the 2023 FIM Motocross World Championship, Everts became the third generation of his family to win a Grand Prix.

Everts has finished fourth in the final standings of the MX2 class in the Motocross World Championship on three separate occasions.

Everts has represented his country at the Motocross des Nations on four occasions. Belgium's win at the 2026 edition meant that the Everts family have had three generations win the event.

== Career ==
=== Junior career ===
Everts raced extensively throughout the categories in his junior career, debuting in the European Motocross Championship in the 65cc class in 2014. In the following season, he was able to finish fifth overall in the same class, whilst he also competed in the FIM Motocross Junior World Championship, where he finished 12th overall.

By 2017, Everts had moved up to the 85cc class and in 2018, he was able to finish third overall in the European Motocross Championship. This good form was carried to the 2018 Junior World Championships in Horsham, Australia, where he was able to win the opening race. Everts' form in his last season on an 85 resulted in him being signed on a multi-year deal by KTM's Racing Division.

Everts operated out of his own family structure for the 2019 European Motocross Championship, competing in the EMX125 class. He had a consistent season, scoring in all but one race and finishing eighth in the final standings. In 2020, Everts was able to take a dominant double victory at the opening round of the series in Great Britain. The following weekend he made his debut in the EMX250 class, finishing in the top-ten overall on debut. Shortly following this, the COVID-19 pandemic disrupted the 2020 season. Upon its return, Everts again mixed the following rounds of the EMX250 class, where he had two more top-10 race finishes and the second round of the EMX125 series. Unfortunately, at the second round of EMX125, he crashed and dislocated wrist, ending his season in injury.

=== 250 career ===
Everts would ride full-time in the EMX250 class in 2021. He placed consistently in the top-ten throughout the season, which included a podium at the second round. In addition to this, he made his Grand Prix debut as a wildcard at the round in Riola Sardo. Everts was called up to represent Belgium at the 2021 Motocross des Nations for the first, helping his country finish sixth overall and fourth in the MX2 class as an individual.

Everts moved full time to the MX2 class during the 2022 FIM Motocross World Championship, signing for the Diga Procross KTM team. Everts crashed during qualifying for the opening round of the season, breaking his finger. After missing the first four rounds due to this injury, Everts rode consistently inside the top-ten during the rest of the season, including a best race finish of fourth in the second race in Spain. An eventual tenth overall in the final standings caused Everts to make his second appearance for Belgium in the 2022 Motocross des Nations. He was once again fourth individually in the MX2 class, with the team coming away fifth overall.

For the 2023 FIM Motocross World Championship, Everts signed his first factory contract with KTM. By the fourth round of the championship, Everts scored his first overall podium at World Championship level. By round ten in Germany, Everts was able to seize on a mechanical issue for Lucas Coenen to win the second race and by extension the Grand Prix. He continued to improved rapidly following this, picking up two more overall podiums before winning the Dutch and Turkish Grand Prix. This placed him second with two rounds to go, but, a heavy crash in the same race that his teammate Andrea Adamo became world champion meant Everts would ultimately drop to fourth in the final standings. Following his campaign, he stepped up to ride a 350 in the Open class in the 2023 Motocross des Nations for Belgium. Despite this being his first time racing that capacity of bike, Everts rode impressively, finishing third in the second race. This was the best individual result for a Belgian rider at the event and contributed to them finishing fifth overall.

Everts missed the opening round of the 2024 FIM Motocross World Championship due to a right thumb injury sustained pre-season. After returning at the second round, Everts was able to take back-to-back Grand Prix overall wins at round four and five - including a dominant performance in deep mud in Portugal. He scored three more podiums throughout the rest of the season but a crash with Lucas Coenen at the penultimate round in China saw him sustain a broken C5 vertebra which ended his campaign. In the off season, Everts moved to the Nestaan Husqvarna Factory Racing Team for the 2025 season and announced that hew would no longer run his fathers racing number of 72. He had a strong start to the season, winning the second Grand Prix of the season, conquering the deep mud in Spain. Everts went on to win the qualifying race at the fifth round in Italy, before finishing second overall in Switzerland and Great Britain. A big crash in the qualifying race at the next round in Finland resulted in a sacral fracture, which saw him miss the following two rounds. After a small spell on the sidelines, he rode the final five Grand Prix of the season, to finish sixth in the MX2 standings and be selected in the Open class for the Belgian team at the 2025 Motocross des Nations. Stepping up to ride a 450cc motorcycle, Everts was an integral part of the team's final position of fourth in the event.

Everts had a consistent start to the 2026 FIM Motocross World Championship, standing on the overall podium at the third and fourth rounds of the series. He would have to wait until the thirteenth round to score his first race win of the season, before finishing on the overall podium at all of the last five grand prix. His strong end to the season was coupled with a pole position and single race win at the Dutch round and winning the second race at the final round in Australia. Everts' strong form at the end of the campaign was carried into the 2026 Motocross des Nations. Stepping up to ride a 450 as in the previous edition, Everts finished second in his qualifying race before finishing fourth in his two main races. Strong rides from the Coenen brothers alongside this meant that Belgium won the event for the first time for thirteen years. Everts became the third member of his family to stand on the top step of the podium whilst representing their country.

== Honours ==
Motocross des Nations

- Team Overall: 2026 (Belgium) (gold)

European Motocross Championship

- EMX85: 2018 (bronze)

ADAC MX Masters

- Junior Cup 85: 2018 (silver)

== MXGP Results ==
Year	Rnd 1	Rnd 2	Rnd 3	Rnd 4	Rnd 5	Rnd 6	Rnd 7	Rnd 8	Rnd 9	Rnd 10	Rnd 11	Rnd 12	Rnd 13	Rnd 14	Rnd 15	Rnd 16	Rnd 17	Rnd 18	Rnd 19	Rnd 20	Average Finish	Podium Percent	Place
2023 MX2	9	9	7	2	15	6	3	6	1	2	5	11	4	3	2	1	1	12	6	-	5.52	42%	4th
2024 MX2	OUT	5	5	1	1	3	5	7	5	2	6	6	4	4	6	5	3	4	9	OUT	4.50	28%	4th
2025 MX2	4	1	4	6	13	2	18	4	7	6	4	2	OUT	OUT	OUT	8	5	6	6	8	6.11	18%	6th
2026 MX2	4 ARG (Argentina)	7 AND (Andalusia)	3 SUI (Switzerland)	3 SAR (Sardinia)	7 TRE	4 FRA (France)	8 GER (Germany)	6 LAT (Latvia)	4 ITA (Italy)	4 POR (Portugal)	6 RSA (South Africa)	4 GBR (United Kingdom)	5 CZE (Czech Republic)	12 FLA (Flanders)	2 SWE (Sweden)	2 NED (Netherlands)	3 TUR (Turkey)	3 CHN (China)	2 AUS (Australia)	-	4.68	37%	4th
