= 2021 European Motocross Championship =

The 2021 European Motocross Championship is the 33rd European Motocross Championship season since it was revived in 1988. It includes 15 events and 6 different classes. It will start in Italy on 25 April, and will end at a yet to be announced location on 31 October. All rounds will act as support classes at the European rounds of the 2021 MXGP.

== EMX250 ==
A 9-round calendar for the 2021 season was announced on 11 November 2020. EMX250 is for riders competing on 2-stroke and 4-stroke motorcycles between 175cc-250cc. Only riders under the age of 23 are allowed to compete.

=== Calendar ===
Round	Date	Grand Prix	Location	Race 1 Winner	Race 2 Winner	Round Winner	Report
1	26 June	Great Britain	Matterley Basin	(Italy) Nicholas Lapucci	(Italy) Nicholas Lapucci	(Italy) Nicholas Lapucci	
2	17 July	Netherlands	Oss	(Italy) Nicholas Lapucci	(Netherlands) Rick Elzinga	(Netherlands) Rick Elzinga	
3	31 July	Belgium	Lommel	(Italy) Nicholas Lapucci	(Netherlands) Rick Elzinga	(Italy) Nicholas Lapucci	
4	7 August	Latvia	Ķegums	(Norway) Kevin Horgmo	(Italy) Nicholas Lapucci	(Norway) Kevin Horgmo	
5	2 October	Germany	Teutschenthal	(Italy) Nicholas Lapucci	(Italy) Nicholas Lapucci	(Italy) Nicholas Lapucci	
6	9 October	France	Lacapelle-Marival	(Norway) Håkon Fredriksen	(Italy) Nicholas Lapucci	(Norway) Håkon Fredriksen	
7	26 October	(Italy) MXGP of Pietramurata	Pietramurata	(Italy) Nicholas Lapucci	(Italy) Andrea Bonacorsi	(Norway) Cornelius Tøndel	
8	30 October	(Italy) MXGP of Garda	Pietramurata	(Italy) Andrea Bonacorsi	(Norway) Kevin Horgmo	(Norway) Kevin Horgmo	
9	6 November	(Lombardy) MXGP of Lombardia	Mantova	(Italy) Nicholas Lapucci	(Italy) Nicholas Lapucci	(Italy) Nicholas Lapucci	
10	9 November	(Italy) MXGP of Città di Mantova	Mantova	(Norway) Kevin Horgmo	(Italy) Nicholas Lapucci	(Norway) Håkon Fredriksen	

=== Entry list ===
Team	Constructor	No	Rider	Rounds
Fantic Factory Team Maddii	Fantic	3	(Italy) Federico Tuani	1–2, 4–8, 10
Fantic Factory Team Maddii	Fantic	7	(Germany) Maximilian Spies	1–2, 4–8, 10
Fantic Factory Team Maddii	Fantic	21	(Italy) Nicholas Lapucci	All
Ghidinelli Racing Yamaha	Yamaha	10	(Spain) Oriol Oliver	1–2
Ghidinelli Racing Yamaha	Yamaha	26	(Sweden) Tim Edberg	
Ghidinelli Racing Yamaha	Yamaha	344	(Italy) Pietro Razzini	1
WZ KTM Racing	KTM	10	(Spain) Oriol Oliver	3–10
WZ KTM Racing	KTM	572	(Denmark) Rasmus Pedersen	1–2, 5–6
WZ KTM Racing	KTM	696	(Switzerland) Mike Gwerder	All
	Yamaha	11	(Netherlands) Henk Pater	3
Mills Racing	KTM	12	(United Kingdom) Christopher Mills	2–3, 5–6
Chambers Racing	Husqvarna	16	(United Kingdom) Tom Grimshaw	1–2
Steels Dr Jack Fly Over TM	TM	18	(Italy) Leonardo Angeli	3
Steels Dr Jack Fly Over TM	TM	228	(Italy) Emilio Scuteri	2–3
Kristera Serģa Motoklubs	Yamaha	19	(Latvia) Mairis Pumpurs	2–4
Rockstar Energy Husqvarna Factory Racing Team	Husqvarna	20	(France) Maxime Grau	All
Maggiora Park Racing Team	KTM	23	(Italy) Tommaso Sarasso	2–3, 7–8
Maggiora Park Racing Team	KTM	50	(Italy) Paolo Lugana	2–3, 5–10
SM Action - MC Migliori Gas Gas	Gas Gas	24	(Norway) Kevin Horgmo	All
TBS Conversions KTM	KTM	26	(Sweden) Tim Edberg	3–5
TBS Conversions KTM	KTM	44	(Netherlands) Rick Elzinga	All
TBS Conversions KTM	KTM	474	(Netherlands) Twan van Essen	
TBS Conversions KTM	KTM	651	(Estonia) Meico Vettik	All
TBS Conversions KTM	KTM	744	(France) Saad Soulimani	2–3, 7–10
Team VHR KTM Racing	KTM	27	(France) Tom Guyon	1, 4–7
Team VHR KTM Racing	KTM	100	(France) Scotty Verhaeghe	1–3
Team VHR KTM Racing	KTM	810	(France) Yann Crnjanski	6–8
GBO Motorsport	Gas Gas	28	(Italy) Alberto Elgari	7–10
Mulders Motoren	KTM	32	(Netherlands) Marcel Conijn	1–6
Mulders Motoren	KTM	653	(Netherlands) Rob Windt	5–10
SKS Husqvarna Racing Team	Husqvarna	33	(Netherlands) Kay Karssemakers	2
Hutten Metaal Yamaha Racing Official EMX250 Team	Yamaha	35	(Italy) Andrea Bonacorsi	All
Hutten Metaal Yamaha Racing Official EMX250 Team	Yamaha	104	(Germany) Jeremy Sydow	All
Hutten Metaal Yamaha Racing Official EMX250 Team	Yamaha	147	(Australia) Bailey Malkiewicz	2–4
Hutten Metaal Yamaha Racing Official EMX250 Team	Yamaha	484	(Netherlands) Dave Kooiker	All
Team Beddini KTM Racing	KTM	37	(Italy) Yuri Quarti	1–5, 7
Team Beddini KTM Racing	KTM	568	(Sweden) Max Pålsson	9–10
	KTM	40	(Estonia) Martin Michelis	3–4, 7–10
JPV Racing	Honda	42	(Finland) Sampo Rainio	5, 7–10
MGR Motocross Team	KTM	43	(Finland) Matias Vesterinen	4
	Husqvarna	51	(Belgium) Adrien Wagener	1–3
Marin & Fritid Husqvarna	Husqvarna	52	(Sweden) Albin Gerhardsson	7–10
	Husqvarna	53	(Italy) Giacomo Bosi	5, 7–9
Team S11 Motorsport - Diana MX	Husqvarna	56	(Italy) Lorenzo Corti	1–3, 5–8
Team S11 Motorsport - Diana MX	Husqvarna	344	(Italy) Pietro Razzini	2–3, 5–7
Max Bart Racing Team	KTM	64	(Italy) Lorenzo Ciabatti	5, 7–10
Hitachi KTM fuelled by Milwaukee	KTM	66	(Republic of Ireland) Conor Mullan	6–7
Team VRT KTM	KTM	67	(Spain) Yago Martínez	All
Team VRT KTM	KTM	78	(France) Axel Louis	1–4
Team VRT KTM	KTM	94	(Spain) David Braceras	1–9
Team VRT KTM	KTM	217	(United Kingdom) Eddie Jay Wade	5–9
Sixty Two Motorsport Husqvarna Team	Husqvarna	69	(Sweden) Filip Olsson	1–8
Nick Brouwer Trading	KTM	71	(Netherlands) Jaap Janssen	5
Team KTM Liamski	KTM	72	(Belgium) Liam Everts	1–9
LB Racing Team	Gas Gas	74	(Italy) Alessandro Valeri	7, 9
Buitenhuis Racing	Yamaha	77	(Netherlands) Kevin Buitenhuis	3
STC Racing Team	Yamaha	90	(Germany) Justin Trache	2–3, 5, 9–10
KTM Racing Center Antwerpen	KTM	95	(Belgium) Marnick Lagrou	3
Yamaha Ausio Racing Team	Yamaha	96	(Spain) Víctor Alonso	5–8, 10
KTM Scandinavia	KTM	107	(Sweden) Emil Jonrup	2
Honda Racing Assomotor	Honda	108	(New Zealand) James Scott	3
Honda Racing Assomotor	Honda	125	(Finland) Emil Weckman	1–2, 5–10
MotorMix Racing Team	Gas Gas	111	(Italy) Alessandro Manucci	2
Team Racestore Gas Gas	Gas Gas	115	(Italy) Andrea Roncoli	1–3, 5–10
Challenger Scaffolding/Hollamby	KTM	117	(United Kingdom) Ike Carter	1
No Fear Jumbo BT Racing	Husqvarna	122	(South Africa) Camden McLellan	1, 3–6, 9–10
No Fear Jumbo BT Racing	Husqvarna	261	(Estonia) Jörgen-Matthias Talviku	All
	Gas Gas	124	(Netherlands) Didier van Kasteren	3
Team Made Of	Gas Gas	127	(Italy) Manuel Ulivi	9–10
Team Made Of	Gas Gas	974	(Italy) Mario Tamai	9–10
PAR Homes Husqvarna	Husqvarna	132	(United Kingdom) Calum Mitchell	1–3
PAR Homes Husqvarna	Husqvarna	247	(France) Florian Miot	1–3
Maxi Rakennus/Jokopa.fi	Husqvarna	143	(Finland) Wiljam Malin	2
KMP Honda Racing	Honda	145	(Germany) Pascal Jungmann	2, 5–6
KMP Honda Racing	Honda	155	(Germany) Tom Schröder	3, 5
	KTM	164	(Bulgaria) Nikolay Malinov	3–4
HM Racing	KTM	171	(Germany) Fynn-Niklas Tornau	5
Bloms MX	Husqvarna	180	(Sweden) Leopold Ambjörnsson	1–6
Crescent Yamaha	Yamaha	184	(United Kingdom) James Carpenter	1
MBP Motocross Team	KTM	191	(Lithuania) Erlandas Mackonis	2, 4
Orion Racing Team	KTM	199	(Czech Republic) Petr Rathouský	7–8
Honda SR Motoblouz	Honda	200	(Switzerland) Luca Diserens	1–2
Honda SR Motoblouz	Honda	249	(France) Mathéo Miot	
Planet Moto	KTM	202	(United Kingdom) Tyler Westcott	1
VIP Lounge MX Team	KTM	211	(Netherlands) Romano Aspers	1–3, 5, 9–10
VIP Lounge MX Team	KTM	338	(Belgium) Tallon Verhelst	
	Yamaha	241	(Belgium) Sam Jordant	2–3
KTM Sarholz Racing Team	KTM	242	(Netherlands) Kjell Verbruggen	2–4
Raths KTM Motorsport	KTM	244	(Germany) Max Bülow	1–3
Team Martin Racing Technology	Honda	250	(Italy) Denny Bastianon	8
Wozniak Racing	Yamaha	256	(Denmark) Magnus Smith	1–5, 7–10
Gas Gas Farioli	Gas Gas	270	(Italy) Eugenio Barbaglia	2–3, 7–10
Motokrosovaskola Q Racing	Husqvarna	271	(Czech Republic) Stanislav Vašíček	1
Motokrosovaskola Q Racing	Husqvarna	437	(Czech Republic) Martin Venhoda	1–2
GripMesser Racing Team	Suzuki	272	(Germany) Niklas Schneider	2–3
Miljoexperten EasyMX Racing	KTM	298	(Denmark) Nicklas Haagensen	5
	KTM	301	(United Kingdom) Mark Bracegirdle	1
Riley Racing Yamaha	Yamaha	302	(Norway) Cornelius Tøndel	All
Riley Racing Yamaha	Yamaha	410	(Netherlands) Raivo Dankers	
Riley Racing Yamaha	Yamaha	427	(Norway) Håkon Fredriksen	5–10
Riley Racing Yamaha	Yamaha	817	(Netherlands) Raf Meuwissen	All
SHR Motorsports	Yamaha	306	(Germany) Julian Duvier	5
F4E Gas Gas Racing Team	Gas Gas	309	(Spain) Guillem Farrés	2–3, 5–10
F4E Gas Gas Racing Team	Gas Gas	771	(Spain) Mario Lucas	1–3
3MM Energy Drink BUD Racing Kawasaki	Kawasaki	319	(France) Quentin Prugnières	All
3MM Energy Drink BUD Racing Kawasaki	Kawasaki	427	(Norway) Håkon Fredriksen	1–4
Tech32 Racing Team	Husqvarna	324	(France) Maxime Charlier	5–9
	Husqvarna	333	(Netherlands) Sander Hofstede	9
	Yamaha	336	(Netherlands) Remco Ketels	3
	KTM	359	(Australia) Dale Doutch	1
Nilsson Training Namura KTM	KTM	368	(Spain) Samuel Nilsson	1–3, 5
KTM Motofavorits MX Team	KTM	377	(Lithuania) Nojus Gasiunas	4
Gaidão Motor Team	Gas Gas	407	(Portugal) Afonso Gaidão	
Brouwer Jumbo Gas Gas	Gas Gas	411	(Netherlands) Kjeld Stuurman	1–4, 9–10
	Gas Gas	418	(Netherlands) Jeremy de Jong	3
	KTM	419	(Netherlands) Jan Spliethof	1
ProGrip Racing/No Fear Energy Drink	KTM	424	(Russia) Nikita Kucherov	All
Team Ecomaxx Fuels	Husqvarna	444	(Netherlands) Jeremy Knuiman	1–3
PMC Honda Center Estonia	Honda	454	(Estonia) Mikk Martin Lõhmus	4
CEC Husqvarna Scandinavia	Husqvarna	464	(Sweden) Rasmus Håkansson	2–3
Jezyk Racing Team	KTM	469	(United States) Jamie Astudillo	5–6
ADAC Berlin-Brandenburg	Yamaha	470	(Germany) Peter König	2–3
Kaersgaard Motorservice	Kawasaki	475	(Denmark) Oliver Olsen	2–3
Otto Racing Team	Honda	485	(Finland) Kim Savaste	1, 5–8
Motor2000 KTM Racing Team	KTM	489	(Netherlands) Jens Walvoort	1–3
MAFI Yamaha Scandinavia	Yamaha	494	(Sweden) Andre Högberg	2
FF Racing Team	Gas Gas	505	(Sweden) Arvid Lüning	1
Zweiradsport Brunner	KTM	522	(Germany) Dominik Grau	7
KTM Kosak Racing Team	KTM	532	(Germany) Constantin Piller	1, 3, 5–10
Castrol Power1 Moto-Base MX Team	KTM	543	(Germany) Nick Domann	2–3, 5
DAM Racing	KTM	563	(Belgium) Wesly Dieudonné	1–3
	Yamaha	615	(Latvia) Rudolfs Aumeistars	4
Hostettler Yamaha Racing	Yamaha	626	(Switzerland) Joel Elsener	1–6, 9
Brouwer Motors	KTM	629	(Netherlands) Twan Wagenaar	2
JH MX Service	Gas Gas	664	(Netherlands) Rutger Baauw	2
	KTM	671	(Belgium) Brent Aerden	3
FFF Sporta Klubs	Husqvarna	684	(Latvia) Uldis Freibergs	4, 10
M.B.T. Racing Team	Husqvarna	710	(Italy) Morgan Bennati	7–8, 10
M.B.T. Racing Team	Husqvarna	838	(Italy) Paolo Ermini	7–8, 10
Gabriel Motocross KTM	KTM	712	(United Kingdom) Josh Peters	2–4
Motorrad Bauerschmidt	Gas Gas	716	(Germany) Leon Rehberg	5
Motorrad Bauerschmidt	Husqvarna	836	(Denmark) William Voxen Kleeman	2–10
Motorrad Bauerschmidt	Husqvarna	839	(Denmark) Victor Voxen Kleemann	1–4, 6–10
JD Gunnex KTM	KTM	717	(Czech Republic) Jan Wagenknecht	9–10
RedMoto Estonia	KTM	718	(Estonia) Kairo Katkosilt	4
HTS KTM	KTM	721	(Hungary) Kristóf Jakob	5, 7, 9–10
Freetime Motokeskus	Husqvarna	733	(Estonia) Kaarel Tilk	4, 9–10
Diga KTM	KTM	741	(Belarus) Daniel Volovich	3–4
MX Moduls	Husqvarna	765	(Latvia) Edvards Bidzāns	2, 4
MSC Imbach MX Racing Team	Husqvarna	818	(Austria) Markus Rammel	2–3
Ride and Race Husqvarna	Husqvarna	833	(Belgium) Ugo Moors	5
KTL Racing	KTM	841	(Estonia) Egert Pihlak	4
	Gas Gas	891	(Netherlands) Boris Blanken	1
Honda 114 Motorsports	Honda	912	(United Kingdom) Joel Rizzi	7–8
Vogelsang Powersports	Yamaha	944	(Switzerland) Nico Häusermann	7–8
Filten Racing Team	Yamaha	959	(Denmark) Mike Lauritsen	1

=== Riders Championship ===
Pos	Rider	Bike	GBR (United Kingdom)		NED (Netherlands)		BEL (Belgium)		LAT (Latvia)		GER (Germany)		FRA (France)		PIE (Italy)		GAR (Italy)		LOM		CDM (Italy)		Points
1	(Italy) Nicholas Lapucci	Fantic	1	1	1	3	1	2	3	1	1	1	12	1	1	12	3	3	1	1	4	1	438
2	(Norway) Kevin Horgmo	Gas Gas	3	2	3	5	4	3	1	2	3	2	6	6	2	6	2	1	6	5	1	11	385
3	(Netherlands) Rick Elzinga	KTM	11	Ret	2	1	3	1	2	3	2	6	7	8	6	10	11	8	8	6	3	3	325
4	(Italy) Andrea Bonacorsi	Yamaha	10	6	4	4	12	29	Ret	18	4	3	2	3	10	1	1	10	4	7	10	4	287
5	(Norway) Håkon Fredriksen	Kawasaki	9	4	12	Ret	Ret	Ret	28	19													252
5	(Norway) Håkon Fredriksen	Yamaha									6	Ret	1	2	5	8	5	2	5	2	2	2	252
6	(Norway) Cornelius Tøndel	Yamaha	2	5	7	16	6	Ret	Ret	5	12	24	3	10	3	3	4	5	16	4	7	15	245
7	(Belgium) Liam Everts	KTM	12	10	5	2	5	4	5	28	11	5	10	5	4	4	6	6	DNS	DNS			227
8	(Spain) Yago Martínez	KTM	5	8	8	8	29	31	4	4	15	7	9	16	15	13	13	9	2	8	6	6	227
9	(Finland) Emil Weckman	Honda	7	3	DNQ	DNQ					17	13	5	11	9	2	23	7	11	9	Ret	9	154
10	(Switzerland) Mike Gwerder	KTM	27	11	10	19	10	8	9	6	16	15	16	13	Ret	DNS	19	13	7	19	12	13	141
11	(Spain) Oriol Oliver	Yamaha	17	17	29	23																	137
11	(Spain) Oriol Oliver	KTM					23	15	13	15	18	16	22	12	16	16	9	DNS	3	3	5	7	137
12	(France) Maxime Grau	Husqvarna	4	31	30	14	DNQ	DNQ	26	8	10	11	Ret	9	8	5	8	27	Ret	11	17	12	136
13	(Germany) Maximilian Spies	Fantic	16	7	DNQ	DNQ			19	7	9	8	18	15	12	15	14	14			13	8	119
14	(Germany) Jeremy Sydow	Yamaha									7	9	14	20	Ret	7	7	4	12	Ret	9	5	117
15	(Spain) Guillem Farrés	Gas Gas			19	22	20	13			8	10	8	7	23	14	DNQ	DNQ	10	10	11	10	112
16	(South Africa) Camden McLellan	Husqvarna	13	21			8	9	16	Ret	5	12	DNQ	DNQ					15	18	8	18	88
17	(Netherlands) Dave Kooiker	Yamaha	25	30	6	6	13	7	7	10	Ret	23	34	28	DNQ	DNQ	26	32	25	15	Ret	19	85
18	(Spain) David Braceras	KTM	24	18	23	7	Ret	22	8	14	21	19	21	17	18	11	10	15	9	Ret			85
19	(Estonia) Jörgen-Matthias Talviku	Husqvarna	Ret	14	9	21	2	5	Ret	DNS	33	DNS	15	19	22	18	15	23	17	17	21	25	82
20	(Italy) Federico Tuani	Fantic	21	20	13	17			6	12	20	21	13	14	7	9	25	25			24	20	80
21	(France) Quentin Prugnières	Kawasaki	Ret	13	21	Ret	11	18	17	Ret	14	14	11	18	13	17	17	20	13	Ret	Ret	24	77
22	(France) Tom Guyon	KTM	DNQ	DNQ					Ret	DNS	13	4	4	4	Ret	DNS							62
23	(Netherlands) Marcel Conijn	KTM	34	36	Ret	12	7	6	11	Ret	DNQ	DNQ	Ret	DNS									48
24	(France) Saad Soulimani	KTM			DNQ	DNQ	15	21							11	22	12	16	19	13	20	14	48
25	(Italy) Yuri Quarti	KTM	8	24	15	13	Ret	Ret	12	Ret	19	18			Ret	27							41
26	(Sweden) Tim Edberg	KTM					9	19	10	11	27	DNS											35
27	(Sweden) Filip Olsson	Husqvarna	DNQ	DNQ	Ret	Ret	Ret	10	Ret	9	DNQ	DNQ	17	22	24	Ret	16	Ret					32
28	(Estonia) Meico Vettik	KTM	37	28	27	Ret	18	Ret	24	Ret	23	33	23	Ret	14	23	DNS	26	23	12	14	17	30
29	(Sweden) Rasmus Håkansson	Husqvarna			11	9	14	27															29
30	(France) Florian Miot	Husqvarna	6	12	DNQ	DNQ	Ret	17															28
31	(Italy) Paolo Lugana	KTM			25	11	26	28			25	35	20	21	19	19	24	Ret	14	20	16	33	28
32	(Sweden) Albin Gerhardsson	Husqvarna													Ret	24	18	11	22	16	18	16	26
33	(Netherlands) Kjell Verbruggen	KTM			14	10	28	Ret	15	24													24
34	(Netherlands) Raf Meuwissen	Yamaha	28	Ret	22	32	16	14	20	16	34	31	27	32	27	25	29	18	28	22	DNS	23	21
35	(Italy) Lorenzo Corti	Husqvarna	15	9	DNQ	DNQ	DNQ	DNQ			24	29	DNQ	DNQ	DNQ	DNQ	DNQ	DNQ					18
36	(Italy) Emilio Scuteri	TM			18	Ret	17	11															17
37	(Spain) Mario Lucas	KTM	18	15	Ret	18	22	16															17
38	(Russia) Nikita Kucherov	KTM	DNQ	DNQ	33	27	19	12	25	Ret	32	30	37	35	30	31	35	DNS	32	25	DNQ	37	11
39	(Netherlands) Kay Karssemakers	Husqvarna			16	15																	11
40	(Italy) Andrea Roncoli	Gas Gas	Ret	Ret	17	30	Ret	Ret			22	20	24	Ret	17	20	28	31	Ret	DNS	Ret	DNS	9
41	(Czech Republic) Petr Rathouský	KTM													Ret	21	21	12					9
42	(United Kingdom) Tom Grimshaw	Husqvarna	14	19	DNQ	29																	9
43	(Australia) Bailey Malkiewicz	Yamaha			32	24	Ret	26	Ret	13													8
44	(Czech Republic) Jan Wagenknecht	KTM																	21	14	23	27	7
45	(Latvia) Mairis Pumpurs	Yamaha			31	28	30	25	14	22													7
46	(Italy) Lorenzo Ciabatti	KTM									DNQ	DNQ			DNQ	DNQ	27	22	DNQ	DNQ	15	26	6
47	(United Kingdom) Eddie Wade	KTM									Ret	17	19	30	DNQ	DNQ	DNQ	DNQ	DNS	DNS			6
48	(United Kingdom) James Carpenter	Yamaha	23	16																			5
49	(Hungary) Kristóf Jakob	KTM									35	Ret			DNQ	DNQ			18	Ret	19	Ret	5
50	(France) Axel Louis	KTM	30	32	DNQ	DNQ	DNQ	DNQ	21	17													4
51	(Spain) Víctor Alonso	Yamaha									DNQ	DNQ	26	31	DNQ	DNQ	30	17			DNQ	DNQ	4
52	(Finland) Matias Vesterinen	KTM							18	20													4
53	(United Kingdom) Ike Carter	KTM	19	22																			2
54	(France) Yann Crnjanski	KTM											31	24	29	26	33	19					2
55	(Germany) Constantin Piller	KTM	33	33			DNQ	DNQ			36	22	28	26	20	Ret	20	Ret	24	33	32	21	2
56	(Italy) Manuel Ulivi	Gas Gas																	20	21	26	31	1
57	(Sweden) Leopold Ambjörnsson	Husqvarna	DNQ	DNQ	20	33	DNQ	DNQ	31	21	DNQ	Ret	DNQ	29									1
58	(Finland) Kim Savaste	Honda	20	Ret							26	26	33	23	26	Ret	Ret	DNS					1
59	(United Kingdom) Christopher Mills	Yamaha			DNQ	DNQ	24	20			30	28	32	34									1
60	(Belgium) Wesly Dieudonné	KTM	DNQ	DNQ	28	20	Ret	DNS															1
	(Italy) Pietro Razzini	Yamaha	DNQ	DNQ																			0
	(Italy) Pietro Razzini	Husqvarna			DNQ	DNQ	21	Ret			28	25	35	36	25	Ret							0
	(France) Maxime Charlier	Husqvarna									Ret	DNS	25	Ret	21	28	Ret	DNS	27	DNS			0
	(United Kingdom) Joel Rizzi	Honda													Ret	Ret	32	21					0
	(Denmark) William Voxen Kleemann	Husqvarna			DNQ	DNQ	25	32	22	25	DNQ	Ret	29	27	DNQ	DNQ	DNQ	28	31	23	22	22	0
	(Finland) Sampo Rainio	Honda									DNQ	DNQ			31	Ret	22	Ret	26	24	31	36	0
	(United Kingdom) Calum Mitchell	Husqvarna	22	27	DNQ	DNQ	DNQ	DNQ															0
	(Latvia) Edvards Bidzāns	Husqvarna			DNQ	DNQ			23	23													0
	(Spain) Samuel Nilsson	KTM	35	23	26	DNS	Ret	24			Ret	32											0
	(Italy) Eugenio Barbaglia	Gas Gas			DNQ	DNQ	DNQ	23							DNQ	30	DNQ	DNQ	29	31	Ret	DNS	0
	(Denmark) Magnus Smith	Yamaha	26	25	DNQ	DNQ	DNQ	DNQ	Ret	DNS	DNQ	DNQ			DNQ	DNQ	Ret	24	DNS	29	25	28	0
	(Netherlands) Jens Walvoort	KTM	36	34	24	26	27	30															0
	(Denmark) Rasmus Pedersen	KTM	29	26	DNQ	DNQ					29	27	30	25									0
	(Netherlands) Jeremy Knuiman	Husqvarna	DNQ	DNQ	34	25	DNQ	DNQ															0
	(Estonia) Kaarel Tilk	KTM							29	26									35	30	28	30	0
	(Italy) Mario Tamai	Gas Gas																	33	26	DNQ	DNQ	0
	(Sweden) Max Pålsson	KTM																	30	27	27	29	0
	(Switzerland) Joel Elsener	Yamaha	DNQ	DNQ	DNQ	DNQ	DNQ	DNQ	30	27	DNQ	DNQ	38	Ret					DNQ	DNQ			0
	(Lithuania) Erlandas Mackonis	KTM			DNQ	DNQ			27	32													0
	(Estonia) Martin Michelis	KTM					DNQ	DNQ	Ret	DNS					DNQ	Ret	31	29	Ret	28	30	Ret	0
	(Italy) Giacomo Bosi	Husqvarna									DNQ	DNQ			28	Ret	36	Ret	DNQ	DNQ			0
	(Netherlands) Kjeld Stuurman	Gas Gas	DNQ	DNQ	36	31	Ret	DNS	32	29									DNQ	DNQ	29	32	0
	(France) Scotty Verhaeghe	KTM	31	29	Ret	DNS	DNQ	DNQ															0
	(Switzerland) Nico Häusermann	Yamaha													32	29	DNQ	DNQ					0
	(Netherlands) Rob Windt	KTM									DNQ	DNQ	36	33	33	Ret	37	30	DNQ	DNQ	Ret	34	0
	(Bulgaria) Nikolay Malinov	KTM					DNQ	DNQ	DNQ	30													0
	(Denmark) Victor Voxen Kleemann	Husqvarna	DNQ	DNQ	DNQ	DNQ	DNQ	DNQ	DNQ	31			DNQ	DNQ	DNQ	DNQ	DNQ	DNQ	34	32	DNQ	DNQ	0
	(Germany) Tom Schröder	Honda					DNQ	DNQ			31	34											0
	(Switzerland) Luca Diserens	Honda	32	35	DNQ	DNQ																	0
	(Germany) Nick Domann	KTM			35	34	DNQ	DNQ			DNQ	DNQ											0
	(Italy) Tommaso Sarasso	KTM			DNQ	DNQ	DNQ	DNQ							DNQ	DNQ	34	Ret					0
	(Italy) Alberto Elgari	Gas Gas													DNQ	DNQ	DNQ	DNQ	Ret	Ret	Ret	35	0
	(Germany) Justin Trache	Yamaha			DNQ	DNQ	DNQ	DNQ			DNQ	DNQ							DNQ	DNQ	DNQ	Ret	0
	(Sweden) Emil Jönrup	KTM			DNQ	Ret																	0
	(Netherlands) Romano Aspers	KTM	DNQ	DNQ	DNQ	DNQ	DNQ	DNQ			DNQ	DNQ							DNQ	DNQ	DNQ	DNQ	0
	(Belgium) Adrien Wagener	Husqvarna	DNQ	DNQ	DNQ	DNQ	DNQ	DNQ															0
	(Germany) Max Bülow	KTM	DNQ	DNQ	DNQ	DNQ	DNQ	DNQ															0
	(United Kingdom) Josh Peters	KTM			DNQ	DNQ	DNQ	DNQ	DNQ	DNQ													0
	(Germany) Pascal Jungmann	Honda			DNQ	DNQ					DNQ	DNQ	DNQ	DNQ									0
	(Italy) Paolo Ermini	Husqvarna													DNQ	DNQ	DNQ	DNQ			DNQ	DNQ	0
	(Italy) Morgan Bennati	Husqvarna													DNQ	DNQ	DNQ	DNQ			DNQ	DNQ	0
	(Czech Republic) Martin Venhoda	Husqvarna	DNQ	DNQ	DNQ	DNQ																	0
	(Denmark) Oliver Olsen	Kawasaki			DNQ	DNQ	DNQ	DNQ															0
	(Germany) Niklas Schneider	Suzuki			DNQ	DNQ	DNQ	DNQ															0
	(Belgium) Sam Jordant	Yamaha			DNQ	DNQ	DNQ	DNQ															0
	(Germany) Peter König	Yamaha			DNQ	DNQ	DNQ	DNQ															0
	(Austria) Markus Rammel	Husqvarna			DNQ	DNQ	DNQ	DNQ															0
	(Belarus) Daniel Volovich	KTM					DNQ	DNQ	DNQ	DNQ													0
	(Latvia) Uldis Freibergs	Husqvarna							DNQ	DNQ											DNQ	DNQ	0
	(United States) Jamie Astudillo	KTM									DNQ	DNQ	DNQ	DNQ									0
	(Republic of Ireland) Conor Mullan	KTM											DNQ	DNQ	DNQ	DNQ							0
	(Italy) Alessandro Valeri	Gas Gas													DNQ	DNQ			DNQ	DNQ			0
	(Denmark) Mike Lauritsen	Yamaha	DNQ	DNQ																			0
	(United Kingdom) Mark Bracegirdle	KTM	DNQ	DNQ																			0
	(Australia) Dale Doutch	KTM	DNQ	DNQ																			0
	(Sweden) Arvid Lüning	Gas Gas	DNQ	DNQ																			0
	(United Kingdom) Tyler Westcott	KTM	DNQ	DNQ																			0
	(Netherlands) Jan Spliethof	KTM	DNQ	DNQ																			0
	(Czech Republic) Stanislav Vašíček	Husqvarna	DNQ	DNQ																			0
	(Netherlands) Boris Blanken	Gas Gas	DNQ	DNQ																			0
	(Netherlands) Twan Wagenaar	KTM			DNQ	DNQ																	0
	(Italy) Alessandro Manucci	Gas Gas			DNQ	DNQ																	0
	(Finland) Wiljam Malin	Husqvarna			DNQ	DNQ																	0
	(Sweden) Andre Högberg	Yamaha			DNQ	DNQ																	0
	(Netherlands) Rutger Baauw	Gas Gas			DNQ	DNQ																	0
	(Belgium) Marnick Lagrou	KTM					DNQ	DNQ															0
	(Belgium) Brent Aerden	KTM					DNQ	DNQ															0
	(Italy) Leonardo Angeli	TM					DNQ	DNQ															0
	(Netherlands) Remco Ketels	Yamaha					DNQ	DNQ															0
	(Netherlands) Didier van Kasteren	Gas Gas					DNQ	DNQ															0
	(Netherlands) Jeremy de Jong	Gas Gas					DNQ	DNQ															0
	(Netherlands) Henk Pater	Yamaha					DNQ	DNQ															0
	(New Zealand) James Scott	Honda					DNQ	DNQ															0
	(Netherlands) Kevin Buitenhuis	Yamaha					DNQ	DNQ															0
	(Estonia) Kairo Katkosilt	KTM							DNQ	DNQ													0
	(Lithuania) Nojus Gasiunas	KTM							DNQ	DNQ													0
	(Estonia) Egert Pihlak	KTM							DNQ	DNQ													0
	(Estonia) Mikk Martin Lõhmus	Honda							DNQ	DNQ													0
	(Latvia) Rudolfs Aumeistars	Yamaha							DNQ	DNQ													0
	(Germany) Leon Rehberg	Gas Gas									DNQ	DNQ											0
	(Netherlands) Jaap Janssen	KTM									DNQ	DNQ											0
	(Denmark) Nicklas Haagensen	KTM									DNQ	DNQ											0
	(Germany) Fynn-Niklas Tornau	KTM									DNQ	DNQ											0
	(Germany) Julian Duvier	Yamaha									DNQ	DNQ											0
	(Belgium) Ugo Moors	Husqvarna									DNQ	DNQ											0
	(Germany) Dominik Grau	KTM													DNQ	DNQ							0
	(Italy) Denny Bastianon	Honda															DNQ	DNQ					0
	(Netherlands) Sander Hofstede	Husqvarna																	DNQ	DNQ			0
Pos	Rider	Bike	GBR (United Kingdom)		NED (Netherlands)		BEL (Belgium)		LAT (Latvia)		GER (Germany)		FRA (France)		PIE (Italy)		GAR (Italy)		LOM		CDM (Italy)		Points

=== Manufacturers Championship ===
Pos	Bike	GBR (United Kingdom)		NED (Netherlands)		BEL (Belgium)		LAT (Latvia)		GER (Germany)		FRA (France)		PIE (Italy)		GAR (Italy)		LOM		CDM (Italy)		Points
1	Fantic	1	1	1	3	1	2	3	1	1	1	12	1	1	9	3	3	1	1	4	1	441
2	Yamaha	2	5	4	4	6	7	7	5	4	3	1	2	3	1	1	2	4	2	2	2	394
3	KTM	5	8	2	1	3	1	2	3	2	4	4	4	4	4	6	6	2	3	3	3	387
4	Gas Gas	3	2	3	5	4	3	1	2	3	2	6	6	2	6	2	1	6	5	1	10	386
5	Husqvarna	4	9	9	9	2	5	16	8	5	11	15	9	8	5	8	11	15	11	8	12	244
6	Honda	7	3	DNQ	DNQ	DNQ	DNQ	DNQ	DNQ	17	13	5	11	9	2	22	7	11	9	31	9	154
7	Kawasaki	9	4	12	Ret	11	18	17	19	14	14	11	18	13	17	17	20	13	Ret	Ret	24	110
8	TM			18	Ret	17	11															17
	Suzuki			DNQ	DNQ	DNQ	DNQ															0
Pos	Bike	GBR (United Kingdom)		NED (Netherlands)		BEL (Belgium)		LAT (Latvia)		GER (Germany)		FRA (France)		PIE (Italy)		GAR (Italy)		LOM		CDM (Italy)		Points

== EMX125 ==
A 9-round calendar for the 2021 season was announced on 11 November 2020. EMX125 is for riders competing on 2-stroke motorcycles of 125cc.

=== Calendar ===
Round	Date	Grand Prix	Location	Race 1 Winner	Race 2 Winner	Round Winner	Report
1	26 June	Great Britain	Matterley Basin	(Norway) Håkon Østerhagen	(Italy) Ferruccio Zanchi	(Norway) Håkon Østerhagen	
2	3 July	Italy	Maggiora	(Norway) Håkon Østerhagen	(Norway) Håkon Østerhagen	(Norway) Håkon Østerhagen	
3	2 October	Germany	Teutschenthal	(Netherlands) Ivano van Erp	(Belgium) Sacha Coenen	(Netherlands) Ivano van Erp	
4	9 October	France	Lacapelle-Marival	(France) Marc-Antoine Rossi	(Italy) Ferruccio Zanchi	(Italy) Valerio Lata	
5	16 October	Spain	intu Xanadu	(Netherlands) Ivano van Erp	(Italy) Valerio Lata	(Netherlands) Ivano van Erp	
6	23 October	MXGP of Trentino	Pietramurata	(Italy) Valerio Lata	(Netherlands) Ivano van Erp	(Netherlands) Ivano van Erp	
7	26 October	(Italy) MXGP of Pietramurata	Pietramurata	(Belgium) Lucas Coenen	(Italy) Valerio Lata	(Italy) Valerio Lata	
8	30 October	(Italy) MXGP of Garda	Pietramurata	(Belgium) Lucas Coenen	(Belgium) Lucas Coenen	(Belgium) Lucas Coenen	
9	6 November	(Italy) MXGP of Città di Mantova	Mantova	(Belgium) Lucas Coenen	(Belgium) Lucas Coenen	(Belgium) Lucas Coenen	

=== Entry list ===
Team	Constructor	No	Rider	Rounds
Marchetti Racing Team KTM	KTM	3	(Italy) Valerio Lata	All
	KTM	4	(Norway) Mathias Kjørstad	3–8
Pavo Rueda Team	Husqvarna	5	(Spain) Daniel Rodríguez	4–8
Pavo Rueda Team	Husqvarna	362	(Spain) Marco Alonso	5–8
RFME MX Junior Team	Gas Gas	6	(Spain) Elias Escandell	All
RFME MX Junior Team	Gas Gas	252	(Spain) Raúl Sánchez	All
RFME MX Junior Team	Gas Gas	305	(Spain) Antonio Gallego	6–9
RFME MX Junior Team	Gas Gas	365	(Spain) Adrià Monné Viles	1–3
RFME MX Junior Team	Gas Gas	373	(Spain) Edgar Canet	3–5
Oragno114 Husqvarna Racing	Husqvarna	8	(Italy) Andrea Viano	1–4, 6–9
Oragno114 Husqvarna Racing	Husqvarna	76	(Italy) Matteo De Sanctis	2
Oragno114 Husqvarna Racing	Husqvarna	129	(Italy) Niccoló Maggiora	1–2
MX Service Brodbeck	TM	9	(Germany) Alexander Hail	2–3
Hofstede MX Team	Husqvarna	10	(Netherlands) Roan Tolsma	6–8
	Yamaha	11	(Germany) Luke Schäfer	3
Fantic Factory Team Maddii	Fantic	12	(Norway) Håkon Østerhagen	1–2
Fantic Factory Team Maddii	Fantic	717	(France) Alexis Fueri	3–9
	Husqvarna	15	(Estonia) Romeo Karu	1, 6–8
RGS MX Team	Husqvarna	17	(Belgium) Junior Bal	2
3MM Energy Drink BUD Racing Junior Team	KTM	19	(Belgium) Sacha Coenen	1–5
3MM Energy Drink BUD Racing Junior Team	KTM	93	(Belgium) Lucas Coenen	All
Team MRC Racing	KTM	21	(Italy) Nathan Mariani	2, 6–9
Pardi Racing Team	KTM	25	(Italy) Alessandro Sadovschi	6–9
Pardi Racing Team	KTM	88	(Italy) Matteo Luigi Russi	6–9
	KTM	27	(Netherlands) Scott Verhoeven	3, 6–8
SKS Husqvarna Racing Team	Husqvarna	33	(Netherlands) Kay Karssemakers	All
SKS Husqvarna Racing Team	Husqvarna	172	(Netherlands) Cas Valk	1, 3–5, 7–9
Relax2Race	Gas Gas	36	(United Kingdom) Hudson Roper	1
Motokurzeme	KTM	43	(Latvia) Roberts Lusis	2–8
je68 KTM Scandinavia	KTM	46	(Sweden) Linus Persson	3
je68 KTM Scandinavia	KTM	961	(Sweden) August Frisk	3–4, 6–8
MJC Yamaha Official EMX125 Team	Yamaha	47	(Latvia) Kārlis Reišulis	2–9
MJC Yamaha Official EMX125 Team	Yamaha	73	(Italy) Ferruccio Zanchi	1, 3–9
MJC Yamaha Official EMX125 Team	Yamaha	432	(Netherlands) Ivano van Erp	All
Team New Bike Yamaha	Yamaha	55	(France) Mathis Barthez	4–9
VisuAlz Production by SAS Kawasaki	KTM	57	(Lithuania) Neilas Pečatauskas	3
MGR Motocross Team	KTM	66	(Italy) Jacopo Rampoldi	2
SHR Motorsports	Yamaha	67	(Germany) Lukas Hechtel	3
SHR Motorsports	Yamaha	576	(Germany) Joel Franz	3
KTM Kosak Racing Team	KTM	70	(Germany) Valentin Kees	3–4, 6–9
KTM Kosak Racing Team	KTM	473	(Germany) Collin Wohnhas	8
KTM Kosak Racing Team	KTM	494	(Germany) Maximilian Werner	1–4
KTM Kosak Racing Team	KTM	714	(Latvia) Markuss Ozolins	7
Motorstore Racing Team	Husqvarna	71	(Italy) Morgan Bennati	2–3
Motorstore Racing Team	Husqvarna	153	(Italy) Riccardo Bindi	2
Motorstore Racing Team	Husqvarna	336	(Italy) Lorenzo Aglietti	2, 6–9
F&H Racing Shop	Kawasaki	75	(Netherlands) Bradley Mesters	1–3, 9
	KTM	77	(Israel) Erez Melman	2–4, 9
F4E Gas Gas Racing Team	Gas Gas	78	(Mexico) Daniel Fragoso	2–9
F4E Gas Gas Racing Team	Gas Gas	463	(Belgium) Baptiste Beernaert	1–2, 4, 6–7
Rides2MX Shop	KTM	79	(Russia) Artemy Rausov	1, 3, 6–9
	Husqvarna	90	(Italy) Matteo Vantaggiato	2
Quality MX Team	KTM	94	(Netherlands) Finn Pullen	6–8
Yamaha Ausio Racing Team	Yamaha	96	(Spain) Mauro Osinalde	3–9
Yamaha Ausio Racing Team	Yamaha	310	(Spain) Víctor Puig	All
Motor2000 KTM Racing Team	KTM	100	(Netherlands) Danny van den Bosse	1–2
	KTM	101	(Netherlands) Mirco ten Kate	3, 6–9
Becker Racing	Husqvarna	105	(Denmark) Lucas Bruhn	3
Team Ecomaxx Fuels	Husqvarna	111	(Netherlands) Damian Knuiman	1
	KTM	113	(Italy) Nicolò Turaglio	1–6
Vemo Beton	KTM	114	(Belgium) Nicolas Vennekens	1–3
K Torino	KTM	115	(Italy) Edgardo Rubinetti	2
MotoXchange Gas Gas MX Team powered by DVS Racingworks	Gas Gas	119	(United Kingdom) Bailey Johnston	1–2
MotoXchange Gas Gas MX Team powered by DVS Racingworks	Gas Gas	480	(Finland) Kasimir Hindersson	3–8
W&M Tatchell	KTM	122	(United Kingdom) Jak Taylor	1, 6–8
Sixty Two Motorsport Husqvarna Team	Husqvarna	123	(Slovenia) Jaka Peklaj	3–4, 6–9
FM Racing Team	Gas Gas	125	(Italy) Giorgio Macri	6–9
WZ KTM Racing	KTM	131	(Germany) Cato Nickel	1–2
RPM Moteur	KTM	133	(France) Gianni Barbier	4
MB82 MX School	KTM	146	(Italy) Davide Brandini	2, 6–9
Kreator Racing	Husqvarna	197	(Croatia) Matija Šterpin	8
	Gas Gas	204	(Italy) Edoardo Volpicelli	2, 8
Team VHR KTM Racing	KTM	207	(France) Xavier Cazal	All
Team VHR KTM Racing	KTM	241	(France) Nicolas Duhamel	1–5
Jezyk Racing Team	KTM	209	(Chile) Nicolás Israel	3–8
HTS KTM	KTM	214	(Hungary) Bence Pergel	3, 6–7, 9
Team Giorgio CBO Group	Husqvarna	220	(France) Toni Giorgessi	2, 4–5, 7–8
Motocross Center/Pavo Rueda Team	Gas Gas	227	(Spain) Pablo Gutiérrez	5
Husqvarna Zambrana	Husqvarna	229	(Spain) Francisco García	5–9
Black Mamba Pro Team	KTM	232	(Spain) Unai Aguiló	2–5
Dream Team Moto	Husqvarna	242	(Italy) Alessandro Gaspari	8–9
	Fantic	243	(Finland) Eelis Viemero	1
Tech 32 Racing Team	Husqvarna	264	(France) Diego Haution	3–9
Tech 32 Racing Team	KTM	282	(France) Marc-Antoine Rossi	All
Team TMX Competition	Yamaha	272	(France) Andreas Carrico	4
Team TMX Competition	Yamaha	301	(France) Noah Vampa	1–4, 6–8
B&B Mallon Racing	Gas Gas	275	(Germany) Eric Rakow	3, 6–7
Momento TT/Jetmar	Gas Gas	291	(Portugal) Fábio Costa	5
MotoRace Yamaha Portugal	Yamaha	311	(Portugal) Sandro Lobo	5
Team MR Mandrile Racing	Yamaha	329	(Italy) Maurizio Scollo	6–8
JK Racing Yamaha	Yamaha	330	(Italy) Daniel Gimm	
JK Racing Yamaha	Yamaha	474	(Denmark) Magnus Gregersen	3–4, 6–7
JPV Team 2024	KTM	358	(Finland) Nico Stenberg	3–9
JPV Team 2024	KTM	595	(Finland) Eliel Lehtinen	1
Roizca	Gas Gas	382	(Spain) Manuel López	5
Beurspro KTM MX Team	KTM	401	(Netherlands) Lotte van Drunen	6, 9
Foxtech Racing	Husqvarna	404	(United Kingdom) Domonic Newbury	1
No Fear Jumbo BT Racing	Husqvarna	408	(Netherlands) Scott Smulders	All
Rest2Race James Watts Coaching	KTM	410	(United Kingdom) James Barker	1–2, 6–8
Cab Screens Crescent Yamaha	Yamaha	419	(United Kingdom) Joe Brookes	6–8
Bardahl Motocross Junior Team	KTM	420	(Italy) Andrea Rossi	1–2
Dragon'tek Yamaha France	Yamaha	446	(France) Adrien Petit	3–4
	KTM	451	(Czech Republic) Julius Mikula	3–9
GRT Holeshot KTM	KTM	456	(United Kingdom) Ollie Colmer	1–2, 6–8
PMS Racing Team	KTM	472	(Italy) Giovanni Meneghello	8–9
Yamaha Racing Center	Yamaha	478	(Norway) Adrian Bølviken	3, 6–8
Cermen Racing Team	KTM	479	(Czech Republic) Vítězslav Marek	3, 6–8
Next Level Professional Yamaha	Yamaha	487	(Norway) Elias Auclair	3, 6
Motors Academy	KTM	505	(France) Dorian Koch	4
Karlströms Motor Husqvarna Scandinavia	Husqvarna	566	(Sweden) Laban Alm	3
ASA United Gas Gas	Gas Gas	579	(United Kingdom) Bobby Bruce	All
UK Racing Motos	Husqvarna	586	(Spain) Daniel Castañondo	5
KTM Eesti Marmorest	KTM	612	(Estonia) Joosep Parn	2, 4, 6
KTM GST Berlin	KTM	645	(Germany) Richard Stephan	3
	Husqvarna	666	(Italy) Riccardo Oldani	2, 6
Team MTA Racing	KTM	669	(Italy) Luca Ruffini	1–2
Bodo Schmidt Motorsport	KTM	681	(Luxembourg) Jamie Heinen	3
FFF Sporta Klubs	Husqvarna	684	(Latvia) Uldis Freibergs	3
JB Racing Team	Gas Gas	703	(France) Kivers Lefebvre	2
Quaglio Racing Tech	KTM	709	(Italy) Pietro dal Fitto	8
ADAC Hessen-Thüringen MX Masters Rookie Team	Gas Gas	770	(Germany) Leon Rudolph	3
KTM Motofavorīts MX Team	KTM	772	(Latvia) Jānis Reišulis	6–8
Laimbacher KTM	KTM	777	(Switzerland) Fabio Artho	2–3, 6–9
Motosport Zingoni	Husqvarna	779	(Italy) Nicola Salvini	2–4
Brouwer Motors	KTM	812	(Netherlands) Sem de Lange	2, 4
	Yamaha	854	(France) Jules Rey	4
Motorrad Bauerschmidt	Husqvarna	905	(Germany) Colin Sarré	2
HSV Ried	Husqvarna	919	(Austria) Maximilian Ernecker	6, 8–9

=== Riders Championship ===
Pos	Rider	Bike	GBR (United Kingdom)		ITA (Italy)		GER (Germany)		FRA (France)		ESP (Spain)		TRE		PIE (Italy)		GAR (Italy)		CDM (Italy)		Points
1	(Italy) Valerio Lata	KTM	8	6	2	2	2	13	2	2	18	1	1	2	2	1	6	5	6	5	330
2	(United Kingdom) Bobby Bruce	Gas Gas	6	2	27	3	3	2	3	17	4	2	3	4	4	3	3	4	Ret	3	297
3	(Belgium) Lucas Coenen	Kawasaki	Ret	DNS	11	21	4	3	5	3	2	8	12	3	1	7	1	1	1	1	287
4	(Netherlands) Kay Karssemakers	Husqvarna	7	4	3	5	6	9	4	5	8	5	5	9	10	5	7	7	14	4	266
5	(Netherlands) Ivano van Erp	Yamaha	17	23	14	Ret	1	4	16	6	1	4	2	1	3	11	16	2	15	2	249
6	(Netherlands) Scott Smulders	Husqvarna	12	9	4	6	16	11	15	8	5	10	11	6	8	6	8	8	4	7	226
7	(Latvia) Kārlis Reišulis	Yamaha			13	Ret	14	17	7	10	10	7	7	10	5	4	2	3	3	6	205
8	(France) Marc-Antoine Rossi	KTM	2	7	Ret	DNS	Ret	8	1	7	13	11	13	5	19	8	9	16	9	11	184
9	(Italy) Ferruccio Zanchi	Yamaha	4	1			5	6	19	1	28	Ret	21	12	17	15	11	10	5	12	166
10	(France) Alexis Fueri	Fantic					7	5	20	9	11	Ret	8	7	6	Ret	5	6	8	Ret	139
11	(Italy) Andrea Viano	Husqvarna	22	12	15	7	10	18	9	14			6	17	14	12	13	11	10	Ret	126
12	(Spain) Raúl Sánchez	Gas Gas	10	11	7	11	12	7	12	4	Ret	Ret	22	Ret	Ret	DNS	17	21	7	10	124
13	(France) Xavier Cazal	KTM	9	19	9	14	Ret	16	10	15	9	6	18	15	11	22	14	18	17	16	120
14	(Netherlands) Cas Valk	Husqvarna	Ret	DNS			8	10	DNQ	DNQ	Ret	DNS			7	9	4	9	2	8	115
15	(Belgium) Sacha Coenen	Kawasaki	3	8	Ret	8	15	1	11	13	6	Ret									110
16	(Spain) Elias Escandell	Gas Gas	Ret	24	8	18	13	14	6	16	14	14	14	16	20	19	22	13	11	15	104
17	(Norway) Håkon Østerhagen	Fantic	1	3	1	1															95
18	(Spain) Víctor Puig	Yamaha	15	15	12	20	Ret	29	13	11	17	12	9	8	36	Ret	36	Ret	13	18	89
19	(Czech Republic) Julius Mikula	KTM					30	20	8	19	7	9	17	22	9	13	10	15	Ret	Ret	83
20	(Hungary) Bence Pergel	KTM					29	12					4	13	12	14			19	14	60
21	(Germany) Valentin Kees	KTM					22	15	21	18			16	14	16	10	15	14	18	20	54
22	(Latvia) Jānis Reišulis	KTM											20	11	Ret	2	12	12			51
23	(Italy) Andrea Rossi	KTM	11	13	6	4															51
24	(Spain) Adrià Monné Viles	Gas Gas	13	20	5	9	DNQ	DNQ													37
25	(Italy) Luca Ruffini	KTM	14	5	23	10															34
26	(Spain) Edgar Canet	Gas Gas					9	35	DNS	DNS	3	Ret									32
27	(France) Diego Haution	Husqvarna					17	24	25	26	15	13	23	18	13	20	19	24	21	24	32
28	(Spain) Antonio Gallego	Gas Gas											10	36	29	32	21	19	12	13	30
29	(Spain) Pablo Gutiérrez	Gas Gas									12	3									29
30	(France) Adrien Petit	Yamaha					11	21	14	12											26
31	(Spain) Francisco García	Husqvarna									16	Ret	15	20	15	24	Ret	22	16	19	25
32	(France) Nicolas Duhamel	KTM	32	10	16	17	Ret	DNS	17	23	Ret	DNS									24
33	(Germany) Cato Nickel	KTM	5	14	DNQ	DNQ															23
34	(Italy) Morgan Bennati	Husqvarna			10	12	28	Ret													20
35	(Netherlands) Bradley Mesters	Kawasaki	Ret	DNS	24	16	21	31											Ret	9	17
36	(Italy) Nicola Salvini	Husqvarna			18	13	18	19	DNQ	DNQ											16
37	(Germany) Maximilian Werner	KTM	16	18	22	15	19	25	DNS	DNS											16
38	(Italy) Nicolò Turaglio	KTM	24	21	19	22	23	28	29	25	31	15	19	Ret							10
39	(Czech Republic) Vítězslav Marek	KTM					32	30					25	21	18	16	Ret	28			8
40	(Estonia) Romeo Karu	Husqvarna	19	16									24	35	Ret	21	27	20			8
41	(Italy) Matteo Luigi Russi	KTM											26	34	30	Ret	29	17	23	17	8
42	(United Kingdom) Bailey Johnston	Gas Gas	18	17	31	26															7
43	(Finland) Kasimir Hindersson	KTM					20	26	18	31	19	Ret	DNQ	DNQ	24	Ret	20	Ret			7
44	(Spain) Unai Aguiló	KTM			33	23	27	Ret	22	Ret	20	16									6
45	(United Kingdom) Joe Brookes	Yamaha											28	25	21	18	18	Ret			6
46	(Norway) Adrian Bølviken	Yamaha					26	23					35	Ret	26	17	DNQ	DNQ			4
47	(Spain) Marco Alonso	Husqvarna									27	17	Ret	28	31	29	DNS	33			4
48	(Italy) Matteo Vantaggiato	Husqvarna			17	27															4
49	(Portugal) Fábio Costa	Gas Gas									21	18									3
50	(Latvia) Roberts Lusis	KTM			DNQ	DNQ	DNQ	DNQ	27	22	22	25	37	19	DNQ	23	25	27			2
51	(Italy) Edoardo Volpicelli	Gas Gas			25	19											DNQ	DNQ			2
52	(Portugal) Sandro Lobo	Yamaha									32	19									2
53	(Finland) Nico Stenberg	KTM					DNQ	DNQ	33	34	25	20	30	24	DNQ	DNQ	DNQ	DNQ	20	21	2
54	(Chile) Nicolás Israel	KTM					Ret	22	30	20	30	21	31	26	DNQ	DNQ	33	31			1
55	(Belgium) Baptiste Beernaert	Gas Gas	20	26	26	24			Ret	21			27	32	DNQ	DNQ					1
56	(France) Toni Giorgessi	Husqvarna			20	Ret			24	38	26	26			25	25	23	35			1
	(Netherlands) Danny van den Bosse	KTM	21	27	35	25															0
	(Netherlands) Sem de Lange	KTM			21	Ret			35	Ret											0
	(France) Mathis Barthez	Yamaha							26	27	23	Ret	Ret	Ret	22	30	DNQ	DNQ	Ret	26	0
	(Norway) Mathias Kjørstad	KTM					DNQ	DNQ	31	24	24	22	DNQ	DNQ	DNQ	DNQ	DNQ	DNQ			0
	(Netherlands) Mirco ten Kate	KTM					Ret	38					DNQ	DNQ	27	27	31	26	DNS	22	0
	(Italy) Alessandro Gaspari	Husqvarna															35	Ret	22	27	0
	(United Kingdom) Ollie Colmer	KTM	Ret	22	DNQ	DNQ							DNQ	DNQ	DNQ	DNQ	Ret	34			0
	(Sweden) August Frisk	KTM					33	33	Ret	30			29	23	23	26	30	25			0
	(Netherlands) Lotte van Drunen	KTM											DNQ	DNQ					24	23	0
	(United Kingdom) James Barker	KTM	23	25	36	32							DNQ	DNQ	DNQ	DNQ	DNQ	DNQ			0
	(Spain) Mauro Osinalde	Yamaha					DNQ	DNQ	32	28	29	23	DNQ	DNQ	DNQ	DNQ	DNQ	DNQ	Ret	DNS	0
	(Italy) Lorenzo Aglietti	Husqvarna			32	33							DNQ	DNQ	33	Ret	34	23	28	32	0
	(France) Gianni Barbier	KTM							23	29											0
	(Mexico) Daniel Fragoso	Gas Gas			DNQ	DNQ	DNQ	DNQ	DNQ	DNQ	33	24	DNQ	DNQ	DNQ	DNQ	DNQ	DNQ	25	25	0
	(Germany) Eric Rakow	Gas Gas					24	27					DNQ	DNQ	28	Ret					0
	(Italy) Davide Brandini	KTM			30	28							36	31	34	28	24	32	33	34	0
	(Norway) Elias Auclair	Yamaha					25	32					34	27							0
	(Finland) Eelis Viemero	Fantic	25	30																	0
	(United Kingdom) Jak Taylor	KTM	26	29									DNQ	DNQ	DNQ	DNQ	DNQ	DNQ			0
	(Germany) Collin Wohnhas	KTM															26	29			0
	(Austria) Maximilian Ernecker	Husqvarna											33	33			32	30	26	30	0
	(Italy) Niccolò Maggiora	Husqvarna	27	28	29	30															0
	(Russia) Artemy Rausov	KTM	33	31			DNQ	DNQ					DNQ	DNQ	DNQ	DNQ	DNQ	DNQ	27	Ret	0
	(Spain) Daniel Rodríguez	Husqvarna							DNQ	DNQ	34	27	DNQ	DNQ	DNQ	34	DNQ	DNQ			0
	(Italy) Alessandro Sadovschi	KTM											DNQ	30	32	31	DNQ	DNQ	32	28	0
	(United Kingdom) Domonic Newbury	Husqvarna	28	36																	0
	(France) Dorian Koch	KTM							28	37											0
	(Italy) Maurizio Scollo	Yamaha											DNQ	DNQ	DNQ	DNQ	28	Ret			0
	(Italy) Riccardo Oldani	Husqvarna			28	DSQ							DNQ	DNQ							0
	(Switzerland) Fabio Artho	KTM			DNQ	DNQ	DNQ	DNQ					DNQ	DNQ	DNQ	DNQ	DNQ	DNQ	29	31	0
	(Italy) Giorgio Macri	Gas Gas											DNQ	DNQ	DNQ	DNQ	DNQ	DNQ	31	29	0
	(Denmark) Magnus Gregersen	Yamaha					DNQ	36	37	35			32	29	Ret	DNS					0
	(Netherlands) Damian Knuiman	Husqvarna	29	32																	0
	(Estonia) Joosep Parn	KTM			DNQ	29			38	33			Ret	DNS							0
	(United Kingdom) Hudson Roper	Gas Gas	30	34																	0
	(Slovenia) Jaka Peklaj	Husqvarna					DNQ	DNQ	DNQ	DNQ			DNQ	DNQ	DNQ	DNQ	DNQ	DNQ	30	35	0
	(France) Noah Vampa	Yamaha	31	33	DNQ	DNQ	DNQ	DNQ	36	36			DNQ	DNQ	DNQ	DNQ	DNQ	DNQ			0
	(Germany) Leon Rudolph	Gas Gas					31	37													0
	(Italy) Riccardo Bindi	Husqvarna			Ret	31															0
	(France) Andreas Carrico	Yamaha							34	32											0
	(Latvia) Markuss Ozolins	KTM													35	33					0
	(Israel) Erez Melman	KTM			DNQ	DNQ	DNQ	DNQ	DNQ	DNQ									DNQ	33	0
	(Italy) Nathan Mariani	KTM			34	34							DNQ	DNQ	DNQ	DNQ	DNQ	DNQ	DNQ	DNQ	0
	(Belgium) Nicolas Vennekens	KTM	34	35	DNQ	DNQ	DNQ	DNQ													0
	(Denmark) Lucas Bruhn	Husqvarna					DNQ	34													0
	(Italy) Matteo De Sanctis	Husqvarna			DNQ	35															0
	(Italy) Giovanni Meneghello	KTM															DNQ	DNQ	Ret	Ret	0
	(Spain) Manuel López	Gas Gas									Ret	Ret									0
	(Finland) Eliel Lehtinen	KTM	Ret	DNS																	0
	(France) Kivers Lefebvre	Gas Gas			Ret	DNS															0
	(Sweden) Laban Alm	Husqvarna					Ret	DNS													0
	(Spain) Daniel Castañondo	Husqvarna									Ret	DNS									0
	(Netherlands) Scott Verhoeven	KTM					DNQ	DNQ					DNQ	DNQ	DNQ	DNQ	DNQ	DNQ			0
	(Netherlands) Roan Tolsma	Husqvarna											DNQ	DNQ	DNQ	DNQ	DNQ	DNQ			0
	(Netherlands) Finn Pullen	KTM											DNQ	DNQ	DNQ	DNQ	DNQ	DNQ			0
	(Germany) Alexander Hail	TM			DNQ	DNQ	DNQ	DNQ													0
	(Belgium) Junior Bal	Husqvarna			DNQ	DNQ															0
	(Germany) Colin Sarré	Husqvarna			DNQ	DNQ															0
	(Italy) Jacopo Rampoldi	KTM			DNQ	DNQ															0
	(Italy) Edgardo Rubinetti	KTM			DNQ	DNQ															0
	(Latvia) Uldis Freibergs	Husqvarna					DNQ	DNQ													0
	(Germany) Richard Stephan	KTM					DNQ	DNQ													0
	(Germany) Joel Franz	Yamaha					DNQ	DNQ													0
	(Germany) Lukas Hechtel	Yamaha					DNQ	DNQ													0
	(Sweden) Linus Persson	KTM					DNQ	DNQ													0
	(Luxembourg) Jamie Heinen	KTM					DNQ	DNQ													0
	(Lithuania) Neilas Pečatauskas	KTM					DNQ	DNQ													0
	(Germany) Luke Schäfer	Yamaha					DNQ	DNQ													0
	(France) Jules Rey	Yamaha							DNQ	DNQ											0
	(Croatia) Matija Šterpin	Husqvarna															DNQ	DNQ			0
	(Italy) Pietro dal Fitto	KTM															DNQ	DNQ			0
Pos	Rider	Bike	GBR (United Kingdom)		ITA (Italy)		GER (Germany)		FRA (France)		ESP (Spain)		TRE		PIE (Italy)		GAR (Italy)		CDM (Italy)		Points

=== Manufacturers Championship ===
Pos	Bike	GBR (United Kingdom)		ITA (Italy)		GER (Germany)		FRA (France)		ESP (Spain)		TRE		PIE (Italy)		GAR (Italy)		CDM (Italy)		Points
1	KTM	2	5	2	2	2	8	1	2	7	1	1	2	2	1	6	5	6	5	359
2	Yamaha	4	1	12	20	1	4	7	1	1	4	2	1	3	4	2	2	3	2	349
3	Gas Gas	6	2	7	3	3	2	3	4	3	2	3	4	4	3	3	4	7	3	341
4	Kawasaki	3	8	11	8	4	1	5	3	2	8	12	3	1	7	1	1	1	1	338
5	Husqvarna	7	4	3	5	6	9	4	5	5	5	5	6	7	5	4	7	2	4	294
6	Fantic	1	3	1	1	7	5	20	9	11	Ret	8	7	6	Ret	5	6	8	Ret	234
	TM			DNQ	DNQ	DNQ	DNQ													0
Pos	Bike	GBR (United Kingdom)		ITA (Italy)		GER (Germany)		FRA (France)		ESP (Spain)		TRE		PIE (Italy)		GAR (Italy)		CDM (Italy)		Points

== EMX Open ==
A 5-round calendar for the 2021 season was announced on 11 November 2020. EMX Open is for riders competing on 2-stroke and 4-stroke motorcycles up to 450cc.

=== Calendar ===
Round	Date	Grand Prix	Location	Race 1 Winner	Race 2 Winner	Round Winner	Report
1	3 July	Italy	Maggiora	(Italy) Filippo Zonta	(Italy) Filippo Zonta	(Italy) Filippo Zonta	
2	17 July	Netherlands	Oss	(Netherlands) Micha-Boy de Waal	(Netherlands) Micha-Boy de Waal	(Netherlands) Micha-Boy de Waal	
3	24 July	Czech Republic	Loket	(Italy) Davide De Bortoli	(Slovakia) Šimon Jošt	(Slovakia) Šimon Jošt	
4	7 August	Latvia	Ķegums	(Estonia) Gert Krestinov	(Estonia) Gert Krestinov	(Estonia) Gert Krestinov	
5	4 September	Turkey	Afyonkarahisar	(Italy) Davide De Bortoli	(Italy) Davide De Bortoli	(Italy) Davide De Bortoli	
6	7 September	(Turkey) Afyon	Afyonkarahisar	(France) Nicolas Dercourt	(Italy) Davide De Bortoli	(France) Nicolas Dercourt	

=== Entry list ===
Team	Constructor	No	Rider	Rounds
WMX Shop	Yamaha	4	(Belgium) Jilani Cambré	1–3
	Kawasaki	9	(Belgium) Ken De Dycker	2
	Husqvarna	11	(Turkey) Ata Kahvecioğlu	5
Laurense Motors	Gas Gas	15	(Netherlands) Erik De Bruyn	2
Honda SR Motoblouz	Honda	16	(France) Nicolas Dercourt	All
Honda SR Motoblouz	Honda	137	(France) Adrien Escoffier	1
	KTM	18	(Turkey) Volkan Özgür	5–6
Revo Seven Kawasaki	Kawasaki	20	(United Kingdom) James Dunn	2
EastMX Gas Gas	Gas Gas	21	(Finland) Emil Silander	4
Galvin MX Team	KTM	24	(Netherlands) Jordy van Orsouw	1–4
Galvin MX Team	KTM	228	(Netherlands) Kay Ebben	1–4
HT Group Racing Team	KTM	32	(Czech Republic) Martin Michek	3
No Fear Jumbo BT Racing	Husqvarna	34	(Netherlands) Micha-Boy de Waal	1–4
Flo R Racing Team	Honda	35	(Belgium) Florent Rouyr	2
KMP Honda Racing	Honda	37	(Estonia) Gert Krestinov	4
Hulho Motocross Team	KTM	38	(Czech Republic) Rudolf Weschta	3
Osička MX Team	KTM	41	(Slovakia) Tomáš Kohút	3
Osička MX Team	KTM	53	(Slovakia) Šimon Jošt	3
Osička MX Team	KTM	377	(Czech Republic) Martin Krč	3
Kros Team Lunardi Racing	Honda	43	(Italy) Davide De Bortoli	All
Raths Motorsports	KTM	44	(Germany) Max Bülow	1
ML MX Team	Honda	47	(Belgium) Jonas Salaets	2–3
Gabriel Motocross KTM	KTM	49	(United Kingdom) John Adamson	1
Team Gasdevil Omnius Truckparts	Yamaha	52	(Netherlands) Davey Janssen	2
MX Boost Auto Looman	Husqvarna	61	(Netherlands) Lars Looman	1–3
MR Lasku	Husqvarna	62	(Estonia) Andero Lusbo	1–4
Quaglio Racing Technologies	KTM	63	(Italy) Giacomo Zancarini	3
Team AB Racing by Zweiradsport Schmitz	Husqvarna	66	(Germany) Tim Koch	3–4
VIP Lounge MX Team	KTM	67	(Netherlands) Kevin van Geldorp	1–2
Yety Motocross Team	KTM	69	(Czech Republic) Petr Játi	3
	KTM	73	(Netherlands) Mike van Kasteren	2
Star Racing Motocross Team	Husqvarna	74	(Turkey) Berkay Kocakaya	5–6
Star Racing Motocross Team	Yamaha	96	(Turkey) Mustafa Çetin	5–6
Buitenhuis Racing	Yamaha	77	(Netherlands) Kevin Buitenhuis	2
	Kawasaki	85	(Italy) Andrea Storti	1, 3
Quality MX Team	KTM	89	(Netherlands) Rico Lommers	1
Quality MX Team	KTM	826	(Netherlands) Nick Leerkes	1–3
STC Racing	Yamaha	90	(Germany) Justin Trache	3
LEF Racing	Suzuki	99	(Belgium) Florent Lambillon	1–3
SS/100 Motosport	KTM	100	(Turkey) Şakir Şenkalaycı	5–6
SS/100 Motosport	KTM	101	(Turkey) Batuhan Demiryol	5–6
Team 505 Racing	KTM	109	(Italy) Riccardo Cencioni	3
Orion Racing Team	KTM	111	(Czech Republic) Petr Bartoš	3
Team Raschle Motos	Yamaha	115	(Lithuania) Dovydas Karka	4
Van der Velden Motoren	KTM	118	(Netherlands) Joël van Mechelen	1–3
Team Motorgas	Husqvarna	124	(Spain) Simeó Ubach	1–4
Silve Racing	Kawasaki	142	(Finland) Jere Haavisto	4
	KTM	145	(Netherlands) Jeroen Bussink	2–3
	Honda	151	(Latvia) Harijs Suharževskis	4
HM Racing	Husqvarna	171	(Germany) Fynn-Niklas Tornau	3
	KTM	185	(Turkey) Mehmet Çelik	5–6
	KTM	188	(Netherlands) Joshua van der Linden	2
Team Griekspoor	KTM	199	(Netherlands) Lars Griekspoor	2
Martin Racing Technology	Honda	200	(Italy) Filippo Zonta	1, 3
Bloms MX Husqvarna Scandinavia	Husqvarna	243	(Sweden) Emil Berggren	2–4
	Husqvarna	244	(Estonia) Tanel Rauk	4
SHR Motorsports	Yamaha	260	(Germany) Nico Koch	3
Softtech KTM	KTM	261	(Turkey) Murat Başterzi	5–6
Gas Gas Farioli	Gas Gas	270	(Italy) Eugenio Barbaglia	1
Motokrosovaskola Q Racing	Husqvarna	271	(Czech Republic) Stanislav Vašíček	2–3
Motokrosovaskola Q Racing	Husqvarna	437	(Czech Republic) Martin Venhoda	3
Becker Racing	KTM	278	(Belgium) Thomas Vermijl	2–3
JTX Racing	KTM	292	(Netherlands) John Cuppen	2
JD Gunnex KTM Racing Team	KTM	299	(Slovakia) Jaroslav Katriňák	3
JD Gunnex KTM Racing Team	KTM	831	(Poland) Tomasz Wysocki	3–6
Chambers Racing	Husqvarna	300	(United Kingdom) Ben Franklin	2–3
Nobis MX Team	KTM	303	(Netherlands) Krijn van Vroenhoven	2
Team NR83	KTM	319	(Belgium) Benoît Englebert	3
JWR Honda Racing	Honda	351	(Sweden) Jeff Oxelmark	1–4
RFX Whites Transport KTM	KTM	360	(United Kingdom) Nathan Dixon	1–2
J.H.J. Racing Team	Kawasaki	399	(Croatia) Matěj Jaroš	1, 3, 5–6
RedMoto Estonia/Freetime Motokeskus	Husqvarna	411	(Estonia) Erki Kahro	4
Nordica Moto	KTM	414	(Romania) Krisztian Tompa	5–6
Schepers Racing Team	KTM	424	(Netherlands) Wesley Schepers	1–2
FRT Racing Motorsport	Husqvarna	499	(Italy) Emanuele Alberio	1
MK Rambas R	Husqvarna	511	(Latvia) Kārlis Kalējs	4
Salmonica	Husqvarna	555	(Russia) Artem Guryev	2
Motor2000 KTM Racing Team	KTM	601	(United Kingdom) Kelton Gwyther	1
Hostettler Yamaha Racing	Yamaha	626	(Switzerland) Joel Elsener	1
Team Gabrielli Moto	Husqvarna	644	(Italy) Ismaele Guarise	1
PuriCure Team	Honda	671	(Czech Republic) Petr Michalec	3
Stránský Sport Team	KTM	707	(Czech Republic) Denis Dvořák	1–3
Nick Brouwer Trading	KTM	715	(Netherlands) Jaap Janssen	1–2, 4
Everest Racing Team	Husqvarna	727	(Belgium) Lucas Roulet	1, 3
Team Tecno B Racing	Honda	743	(Italy) Alessandro D'Angelo	1
AMK Człuchów	KTM	744	(Belarus) Vitaly Makhnou	4
MCR Racing Team	Husqvarna	771	(Italy) Simone Croci	All
Team KTM WPM Motors	KTM	822	(Netherlands) Mike Bolink	1–3
Team Castellari	Gas Gas	860	(Italy) Andrea La Scala	1–4
Bikers Racing Team	KTM	888	(Italy) Gianluca Deghi	1
Yamaha Ausio Racing Team	Yamaha	944	(Spain) Nil Arcarons	1
Bakens Motoren	Yamaha	992	(Belgium) Ryan Bonnewijn	2

=== Riders Championship ===
Pos	Rider	Bike	ITA (Italy)		NED (Netherlands)		CZE (Czech Republic)		LAT (Latvia)		TUR (Turkey)		AFY (Turkey)		Points
1	(Italy) Davide De Bortoli	Honda	4	2	4	2	1	10	3	4	1	1	3	1	249
2	(France) Nicolas Dercourt	Honda	2	3	2	3	9	5	6	3	3	DNS	1	2	214
3	(Italy) Simone Croci	Husqvarna	3	5	11	5	3	6	9	9	2	3	4	4	199
4	(Netherlands) Micha-Boy de Waal	Husqvarna	17	12	1	1	2	Ret	4	2					125
5	(Poland) Tomasz Wysocki	KTM					14	8	11	8	4	2	2	3	125
6	(Italy) Filippo Zonta	Honda	1	1			4	3							88
7	(Estonia) Andero Lusbo	Husqvarna	14	9	17	7	13	11	10	7					80
8	(Spain) Simeó Ubach	Husqvarna	10	19	8	4	11	14	13	12					78
9	(Croatia) Matěj Jaroš	Kawasaki	33	10			Ret	27			6	5	5	5	74
10	(Romania) Krisztian Tompa	Husqvarna									5	4	6	6	64
11	(Turkey) Batuhan Demiryol	KTM									8	6	8	7	55
12	(Sweden) Jeff Oxelmark	Honda	12	7	20	16	17	18	15	11					52
13	(Estonia) Gert Krestinov	Honda							1	1					50
14	(Germany) Tim Koch	Husqvarna					8	2	8	20					49
15	(Belgium) Jilani Cambré	Yamaha	7	6	6	Ret	16	Ret							49
16	(Turkey) Mehmet Çelik	KTM									9	9	9	8	49
17	(Turkey) Şakir Şenkalaycı	KTM									10	7	10	9	48
18	(Netherlands) Kay Ebben	KTM	31	17	5	6	20	15	17	DNS					46
19	(Sweden) Emil Berggren	Husqvarna			9	13	24	20	7	10					46
20	(Turkey) Murat Başterzi	KTM									11	8	11	10	44
21	(Slovakia) Šimon Jošt	KTM					5	1							41
22	(Turkey) Volkan Özgür	KTM									12	10	12	11	39
23	(Czech Republic) Martin Michek	KTM					7	4							32
24	(Finland) Emil Silander	Gas Gas							5	5					32
25	(Belgium) Ken De Dycker	Kawasaki			3	12									29
26	(Czech Republic) Martin Krč	KTM					6	7							29
27	(Turkey) Mustafa Çetin	Yamaha									7	DNS	7	DNS	28
28	(United Kingdom) Nathan Dixon	KTM	9	16	21	11									27
29	(Netherlands) Joël van Mechelen	KTM	Ret	21	7	9	21	32							26
30	(Lithuania) Dovydas Karka	Yamaha							12	6					24
31	(Spain) Nil Arcarons	Yamaha	6	13											23
32	(Czech Republic) Petr Michalec	Honda					10	9							23
33	(Finland) Jere Haavisto	Kawasaki							2	Ret					22
34	(United Kingdom) James Dunn	Kawasaki			13	8									21
35	(Italy) Ismaele Guarise	Husqvarna	13	8											21
36	(Netherlands) Mike Bolink	KTM	21	25	12	10	31	22							20
37	(Italy) Gianluca Deghi	KTM	11	11											20
38	(France) Adrien Escoffier	Honda	Ret	4											18
39	(Netherlands) Lars Griekspoor	KTM			10	14									18
40	(Turkey) Ata Kahvecioğlu	Husqvarna									13	11			18
41	(Slovakia) Tomáš Kohút	KTM					12	13							17
42	(Turkey) Berkay Kocakaya	Husqvarna									DNS	12	13	DNS	17
43	(Italy) Alessandro D'Angelo	Honda	5	Ret											16
44	(Estonia) Erki Kahro	Husqvarna							14	13					15
45	(Italy) Emanuele Alberio	Husqvarna	8	Ret											13
46	(Belgium) Thomas Vermijl	KTM			18	15	19	19							13
47	(Czech Republic) Rudolf Weschta	KTM					18	12							12
48	(Belarus) Vitaly Makhnou	KTM							16	14					12
49	(Netherlands) Nick Leerkes	KTM	22	20	14	17	25	23							12
50	(Italy) Eugenio Barbaglia	Gas Gas	15	15											12
51	(Czech Republic) Petr Bartoš	KTM					15	16							11
52	(Netherlands) Kevin van Geldorp	KTM	19	22	15	22									8
53	(Estonia) Tanel Rauk	Husqvarna							18	16					8
54	(Italy) Andrea La Scala	Gas Gas	16	23	Ret	33	29	28	20	19					8
55	(United Kingdom) John Adamson	KTM	28	14											7
56	(Netherlands) Jaap Janssen	KTM	32	DNS	32	24			21	15					6
57	(Netherlands) Jordy van Orsouw	KTM	30	31	24	25	37	29	19	17					6
58	(Czech Republic) Denis Dvořák	KTM	18	18	34	27	26	Ret							6
59	(Netherlands) Davey Janssen	Yamaha			16	Ret									5
60	(United Kingdom) Ben Franklin	Husqvarna			19	18	30	24							5
61	(Italy) Giacomo Zancarini	KTM					22	17							4
62	(Latvia) Harijs Suharževskis	Honda							22	18					3
63	(Netherlands) Joshua van der Linden	KTM			Ret	19									2
64	(Netherlands) Mike van Kasteren	KTM			25	20									1
65	(Italy) Andrea Storti	Kawasaki	20	34			DNQ	DNQ							1
	(Netherlands) Jeroen Bussink	KTM			22	21	23	21							0
	(Germany) Max Bülow	KTM	23	26											0
	(Netherlands) Kevin Buitenhuis	Yamaha			27	23									0
	(Netherlands) John Cuppen	KTM			23	Ret									0
	(Netherlands) Rico Lommers	KTM	24	27											0
	(Belgium) Florent Lambillon	Suzuki	Ret	24	35	29	DNQ	Ret							0
	(Switzerland) Joel Elsener	Yamaha	25	28											0
	(Slovakia) Jaroslav Katriňák	KTM					28	25							0
	(Belgium) Jonas Salaets	Honda			28	26	27	Ret							0
	(Netherlands) Lars Looman	Husqvarna	27	29	26	32	34	33							0
	(Czech Republic) Stanislav Vašíček	Husqvarna			30	Ret	36	26							0
	(Netherlands) Wesley Schepers	KTM	26	30	Ret	Ret									0
	(Netherlands) Erik de Bruyn	Gas Gas			31	28									0
	(Netherlands) Krijn van Vroenhoven	KTM			29	30									0
	(United Kingdom) Kelton Gwyther	KTM	29	32											0
	(Italy) Riccardo Cencioni	KTM					33	30							0
	(Belgium) Ryan Bonnewijn	Yamaha			33	31									0
	(Czech Republic) Petr Játi	KTM					35	31							0
	(Germany) Fynn-Niklas Tornau	Husqvarna					32	Ret							0
	(Belgium) Lucas Roulet	Husqvarna	34	33			DNQ	DNQ							0
	(Germany) Justin Trache	Yamaha					38	34							0
	(Belgium) Florent Rouyr	Honda			Ret	34									0
	(Russia) Artem Guryev	Husqvarna			Ret	DNS									0
	(Germany) Nico Koch	Yamaha					Ret	DNS							0
	(Czech Republic) Martin Venhoda	Husqvarna					DNS	DNS							0
	(Latvia) Kārlis Kalējs	Husqvarna							DNS	DNS					0
	(Belgium) Benoît Englebert	KTM					DNQ	DNQ							0
Pos	Rider	Bike	ITA (Italy)		NED (Netherlands)		CZE (Czech Republic)		LAT (Latvia)		TUR (Turkey)		AFY (Turkey)		Points

=== Manufacturers Championship ===
Pos	Bike	ITA (Italy)		NED (Netherlands)		CZE (Czech Republic)		LAT (Latvia)		TUR (Turkey)		AFY (Turkey)		Points
1	Honda	1	1	2	2	1	3	1	1	1	1	1	1	289
2	Husqvarna	3	5	1	1	2	2	4	2	2	3	4	4	248
3	KTM	9	11	5	6	5	1	11	8	4	2	2	3	199
4	Kawasaki	20	10	3	8	Ret	27	2	Ret	6	5	5	5	130
5	Yamaha	6	6	6	22	16	34	12	6	7	DNS	7	DNS	102
6	Gas Gas	15	15	31	28	29	28	5	5					44
	Suzuki	Ret	24	35	29	DNQ	Ret							0
Pos	Bike	ITA (Italy)		NED (Netherlands)		CZE (Czech Republic)		LAT (Latvia)		TUR (Turkey)		AFY (Turkey)		Points

== EMX2T ==
A 3-round calendar for the 2021 season was announced on 11 November 2020. EMX2T is for riders competing on 2-stroke motorcycles of 250cc.

=== Calendar ===
Round	Date	Grand Prix	Location	Race 1 Winner	Race 2 Winner	Round Winner	Report
1	25 July	Czech Republic	Loket	(Germany) Maximilian Spies	(Germany) Maximilian Spies	(Germany) Maximilian Spies	
2	1 August	Belgium	Lommel	(Germany) Maximilian Spies	(Germany) Maximilian Spies	(Germany) Maximilian Spies	
3	6 November	(Lombardy) Lombardia	Mantova	(Germany) Maximilian Spies	(Italy) Federico Tuani	(Italy) Federico Tuani	

=== Entry list ===
Team	Constructor	No	Rider	Rounds
Fantic Factory Team Maddii	Fantic	3	(Italy) Federico Tuani	All
Fantic Factory Team Maddii	Fantic	7	(Germany) Maximilian Spies	All
Fantic Factory Team Maddii	Fantic	9	(Belgium) Ken De Dycker	2
	KTM	8	(Netherlands) Bart Poland	2
Yamaha Dragon'tek	Yamaha	15	(France) Maxime Sot	2
Chambers Racing	Husqvarna	20	(United Kingdom) Ben Putnam	All
SHR Motorsports	Yamaha	37	(Germany) Carl Massury	All
Hofstede MX Team	Husqvarna	38	(Netherlands) Karl Timmerman	2
	KTM	47	(Belgium) Dean Van Clapdorp	2
	Yamaha	52	(Belgium) Antoine Cadet	2
Verde Substance KTM	KTM	60	(United Kingdom) Brad Anderson	All
Verde Substance KTM	KTM	957	(United Kingdom) Jake Preston	2
Team Castellari	Gas Gas	62	(Italy) Davide Zampino	3
	KTM	75	(United Kingdom) Aaron Ongley	3
Team Baltic Racing	KTM	82	(Germany) Dennis Fahr	All
	Yamaha	100	(Spain) Juan Munar	1–2
Team 505 Racing	KTM	109	(Italy) Riccardo Cencioni	3
Orion Racing Team	KTM	111	(Czech Republic) Petr Bartoš	3
	KTM	156	(Netherlands) Jamie Lucas	2–3
Raptor Scaffolding/JD Racing	KTM	161	(United Kingdom) Aidan Williams	1
WestcoastMX	KTM	181	(Denmark) Mads Vendelbo	1
Team Schmitz Racing	Husqvarna	197	(Germany) Thomas Haas	1–2
	Husqvarna	198	(Belgium) Dieter Vromans	2
	Husqvarna	200	(Netherlands) René Boer	2
Orion Racing Team	KTM	202	(Czech Republic) Jonáš Nedvěd	1
Nobis MX Team	KTM	303	(Netherlands) Krijn van Vroenhoven	All
	Honda	319	(Belgium) Adrien Chapelle	1–2
	Husqvarna	334	(Netherlands) Kevin Kieft	2
	KTM	359	(Australia) Dale Doutch	3
Jump Race Team	Husqvarna	373	(Italy) Alessio Bonetta	3
M.B.T Racing Team	Husqvarna	385	(Italy) Sebastian Zenato	3
M.B.T Racing Team	Husqvarna	710	(Italy) Morgan Bennati	3
M.B.T Racing Team	Husqvarna	838	(Italy) Paolo Ermini	3
Hobby Motor	KTM	397	(Italy) Yuri Pasqualini	3
Motostar Yamaha Scandinavia	Yamaha	454	(Sweden) Liam Hanström	2
	Husqvarna	517	(Italy) Pablo Caspani	All
TBS Conversions KTM	KTM	531	(Netherlands) Ilja Rutten	All
FiveThreeSeven	KTM	537	(Netherlands) Damian Wedage	2–3
Motor200 KTM Racing Team	KTM	601	(United Kingdom) Kelton Gwyther	3
Brouwer Motors	KTM	629	(Netherlands) Twan Wagenaar	1–2
FFF Sporta Klubs	Husqvarna	684	(Latvia) Uldis Freibergs	3
Nick Brouwer Trading	KTM	715	(Netherlands) Jaap Janssen	2
Team Ecomaxx Fuels	KTM	760	(Netherlands) Michel Otten	2

=== Riders Championship ===
Pos	Rider	Bike	CZE (Czech Republic)		BEL (Belgium)		LOM		Points
1	(Germany) Maximilian Spies	Fantic	1	1	1	1	1	3	145
2	(Italy) Federico Tuani	Fantic	4	2	2	3	2	1	129
3	(United Kingdom) Brad Anderson	KTM	2	3	3	2	3	2	126
4	(United Kingdom) Ben Putnam	Husqvarna	5	5	5	6	5	20	80
5	(Italy) Pablo Caspani	Husqvarna	7	7	21	17	13	5	56
6	(Netherlands) Damian Wedage	KTM			8	9	7	8	52
7	(Netherlands) Krijn van Vroenhoeven	KTM	13	12	11	10	16	16	48
8	(Netherlands) Twan Wagenaar	KTM	8	8	13	11			44
9	(Czech Republic) Jonáš Nedvěd	KTM	3	4					38
10	(Italy) Yuri Pasqualini	KTM					4	4	36
11	(Belgium) Ken De Dycker	Fantic			4	4			36
12	(Germany) Carl Massury	Yamaha	9	11	24	22	18	14	32
13	(Netherlands) René Boer	Husqvarna			7	5			30
14	(Denmark) Mads Vendelbo	KTM	6	6					30
15	(Netherlands) Ilja Rutten	KTM	15	16	15	15	14	Ret	30
16	(United Kingdom) Aaron Ongley	KTM					10	6	26
17	(Latvia) Uldis Freibergs	Husqvarna					9	7	26
18	(Netherlands) Jaap Janssen	KTM			9	7			26
19	(Italy) Davide Zampino	Gas Gas					8	9	25
20	(Netherlands) Jamie Lucas	KTM			17	16	15	11	25
21	(Italy) Morgan Bennati	Husqvarna					6	12	24
22	(Germany) Thomas Haas	Husqvarna	10	9	23	Ret			23
23	(Italy) Paolo Ermini	Husqvarna					11	10	21
24	(France) Maxime Sot	Yamaha			14	8			20
25	(Spain) Juan Munar	Yamaha	12	10	25	23			20
26	(Belgium) Dieter Vromans	Husqvarna			10	14			18
27	(United Kingdom) Aidan Williams	KTM	11	13					18
28	(Netherlands) Karl Timmerman	Husqvarna			12	13			17
29	(Germany) Dennis Fahr	KTM	14	14	22	18	Ret	DNS	17
30	(Sweden) Liam Hanström	Yamaha			6	Ret			15
31	(United Kingdom) Jake Preston	KTM			16	12			14
32	(Italy) Sebastian Zenato	Husqvarna					12	19	11
33	(Belgium) Adrien Chapelle	Honda	16	15	DNS	DNS			11
34	(Italy) Riccardo Cencioni	KTM					Ret	13	8
35	(Italy) Alessio Bonetta	Husqvarna					19	15	8
36	(United Kingdom) Kelton Gwyther	KTM					17	17	8
37	(Australia) Dale Doutch	KTM					20	18	4
38	(Netherlands) Bart Poland	KTM			19	19			4
39	(Netherlands) Michel Otten	KTM			18	24			3
40	(Netherlands) Kevin Kieft	KTM			20	20			2
	(Belgium) Dean Van Clapdorp	KTM			Ret	21			0
	(Belgium) Antoine Cadet	Yamaha			Ret	Ret			0
	(Czech Republic) Petr Bartoš	KTM					Ret	DNS	0
Pos	Rider	Bike	CZE (Czech Republic)		BEL (Belgium)		LOM		Points

=== Manufacturers Championship ===
Pos	Bike	CZE (Czech Republic)		BEL (Belgium)		LOM		Points
1	Fantic	1	1	1	1	1	1	150
2	KTM	2	3	3	2	3	2	126
3	Husqvarna	5	5	5	5	5	5	96
4	Yamaha	9	10	6	8	18	14	61
5	Gas Gas					8	9	25
6	Honda	16	15	DNS	DNS			11
Pos	Bike	CZE (Czech Republic)		BEL (Belgium)		LOM		Points

== EMX85 ==
A 1-round calendar for the 2021 season was announced on 11 November 2020. EMX85 is for riders competing on 2-stroke motorcycles of 85cc.

=== EMX85 ===
Round	Date	Grand Prix	Location	Race 1 Winner	Race 2 Winner	Round Winner	Report
1	18 September	(Sardinia) Sardegna	Riola Sardo	(Czech Republic) Vítězslav Marek	(Latvia) Jānis Reišulis	(Czech Republic) Vítězslav Marek	

=== Participants ===
Riders qualify for the championship by finishing in the top 10 in one of the 4 regional 85cc championships.

No	Rider	Motorcycle
8	(Bulgaria) Vencislav Toshev	Husqvarna
24	(Serbia) Aleksa Milosavljević	Yamaha
71	(Hungary) Noel Zanócz	KTM
77	(Romania) Tudor Stefanescu	Yamaha
84	(Romania) Luca Stefanescu	Yamaha
85	(Romania) Mihnea Andrei Banu	Yamaha
197	(Netherlands) Sem Taspinar	Gas Gas
205	(Italy) Mattia Barbieri	Gas Gas
210	(France) Amaury Maindru	KTM
217	(Italy) Brando Rispoli	Husqvarna
221	(Italy) Filippo Mantovani	KTM
238	(France) Tom Brunet	Husqvarna
242	(Italy) Alessandro Gaspari	Husqvarna
266	(Czech Republic) Václav Janout	KTM
270	(Israel) Ofir Tzemach	Husqvarna
303	(Spain) Salvador Pérez	Yamaha
311	(Italy) Samuele Mecchi	Husqvarna
319	(Austria) Maximilian Ernecker	Husqvarna
327	(Italy) Alessandro Traversini	KTM
351	(Spain) Carlos Prat	Husqvarna
385	(Spain) Carlos Salvador	Gas Gas
393	(Italy) Niccolò Mannini	KTM
394	(Italy) Patrick Busatto	KTM
401	(Netherlands) Lotte van Drunen	KTM
417	(Netherlands) Jayson van Drunen	Yamaha
420	(Sweden) Sandro Sols	KTM
424	(Norway) Marius Nordbø	KTM
471	(Norway) Pelle Gundersen	KTM
474	(Belgium) Ian Ampoorter	KTM
479	(Czech Republic) Vítězslav Marek	KTM
503	(Belgium) Jarne Bervoets	Yamaha
518	(Belgium) Douwe Van Mechgelen	Husqvarna
527	(Netherlands) Mick Kennedy	KTM
528	(Netherlands) Dean Gregoire	KTM
574	(Netherlands) Gyan Doensen	KTM
601	(Latvia) Emīls Solovjevs	Husqvarna
611	(Latvia) Markuss Kokins	Husqvarna
714	(Latvia) Markuss Ozoliņš	KTM
724	(Latvia) Jēkabs Kubuliņš	Yamaha
738	(Poland) Bartosz Jaworski	KTM
740	(Estonia) Travis Leok	KTM
744	(Estonia) Sebastian Leok	Husqvarna
772	(Latvia) Jānis Reišulis	Husqvarna
781	(Lithuania) Marius Adomaitis	Husqvarna

=== Riders Championship ===
Pos	Rider	Motorcycle	SAR (Sardinia)		Points
1	(Czech Republic) Vítězslav Marek	KTM	1	2	47
2	(Latvia) Jānis Reišulis	Husqvarna	3	1	45
3	(Netherlands) Lotte van Drunen	KTM	2	3	42
4	(Netherlands) Gyan Doensen	KTM	4	5	34
5	(Italy) Alessandro Gaspari	Husqvarna	6	6	30
6	(Hungary) Noel Zanócz	KTM	5	9	28
7	(Poland) Bartosz Jaworski	KTM	9	8	25
8	(Belgium) Douwe Van Mechgelen	Husqvarna	7	11	24
9	(Norway) Marius Nordbø	KTM	10	10	22
10	(Austria) Maximilian Ernecker	Husqvarna	14	7	21
11	(Latvia) Markuss Ozoliņš	KTM	23	4	18
12	(France) Tom Brunet	Husqvarna	12	15	15
13	(Belgium) Ian Ampoorter	KTM	11	17	14
14	(Latvia) Markuss Kokins	Husqvarna	17	12	13
15	(Italy) Mattia Barbieri	Gas Gas	8	Ret	13
16	(Italy) Patrick Busatto	KTM	13	18	11
17	(Estonia) Travis Leok	Husqvarna	24	13	8
18	(Lithuania) Marius Adomaitis	Husqvarna	26	14	7
19	(Netherlands) Dean Gregoire	KTM	15	Ret	6
20	(France) Amaury Maindru	KTM	33	16	5
21	(Netherlands) Jayson van Drunen	Yamaha	16	Ret	5
22	(Belgium) Jarne Bervoets	Yamaha	18	22	3
23	(Israel) Ofir Tzemach	Husqvarna	21	19	2
24	(Estonia) Sebastian Leok	Husqvarna	19	24	2
25	(Norway) Pelle Gundersen	KTM	25	20	1
26	(Netherlands) Sem Taspinar	Gas Gas	20	23	1
	(Spain) Salvador Pérez	Yamaha	Ret	21	0
	(Spain) Carlos Salvador	Gas Gas	27	22	0
	(Spain) Carlos Prat	Husqvarna	22	Ret	0
	(Italy) Samuele Mecchi	Husqvarna	32	26	0
	(Latvia) Jēkabs Kubuliņš	Yamaha	28	27	0
	(Italy) Alessandro Traversini	KTM	29	28	0
	(Italy) Brando Rispoli	Husqvarna	36	29	0
	(Italy) Filippo Mantovani	KTM	30	30	0
	(Latvia) Emīls Solovjevs	Husqvarna	31	31	0
	(Bulgaria) Vencislav Toshev	Husqvarna	35	32	0
	(Netherlands) Mick Kennedy	KTM	34	33	0
	(Romania) Mihnea Banu	Yamaha	DNQ	34	0
	(Sweden) Sandro Sols	KTM	Ret	Ret	0
	(Italy) Niccolò Mannini	KTM	Ret	Ret	0
	(Czech Republic) Václav Janout	KTM	Ret	DNS	0
	(Romania) Tudor Stefanescu	Yamaha	DNQ	DNQ	0
	(Serbia) Aleksa Milosavljević	Yamaha	DNQ	DNQ	0
	(Romania) Luca Stefanescu	Yamaha	DNQ	DNQ	0
Pos	Rider	Motorcycle	SAR (Sardinia)		Points

== EMX65 ==
A 1-round calendar for the 2021 season was announced on 11 November 2020. EMX65 is for riders competing on 2-stroke motorcycles of 65cc.

=== EMX65 ===
Round	Date	Grand Prix	Location	Race 1 Winner	Race 2 Winner	Round Winner	Report
1	18 September	(Sardinia) Sardegna	Riola Sardo	(Estonia) Lucas Leok	(Netherlands) Dex van den Broek	(Estonia) Lucas Leok	

=== Participants ===
Riders qualify for the championship by finishing in the top 10 in one of the 4 regional 65cc championships.

No	Rider	Motorcycle
17	(Hungary) Áron Katona	Husqvarna
21	(Romania) Sami Dumitru	Yamaha
96	(Bulgaria) Dani Tsankov	Yamaha
110	(Romania) Tudor Balaban	Yamaha
217	(Spain) Juan Izaguirre	Husqvarna
220	(Spain) Benigno García Sánchez	KTM
244	(France) Tylan Lagain	Yamaha
246	(Spain) José María Hernández	KTM
277	(Spain) Iker Diez	Yamaha
298	(Austria) Ricardo Bauer	KTM
329	(Austria) Moritz Ernecker	Gas Gas
350	(France) Sleny Goyer	Gas Gas
353	(Italy) Andrea Uccellini	Husqvarna
365	(Serbia) Vuk Čajić	Husqvarna
404	(Netherlands) Kenzo Jaspers	Husqvarna
407	(United Kingdom) Elvis Totney	KTM
411	(Netherlands) Dex van den Broek	KTM
418	(Belgium) Torre Van Mechgelen	KTM
421	(Sweden) Dante Lantz	Husqvarna
427	(Netherlands) Chento van Zoest	KTM
450	(Netherlands) Jenairo Beerens	KTM
480	(Netherlands) Teunis Spijkerman	Gas Gas
503	(Czech Republic) Stanislav Pojar	KTM
520	(Slovakia) Maxim Zimmerman	Husqvarna
527	(Czech Republic) Hugo Brant	KTM
528	(Denmark) Storm Maymann	Yamaha
577	(Finland) Viktor Leppälä	KTM
602	(Estonia) Aston Allas	Husqvarna
691	(Belarus) Aliaksandr Frydlender	KTM
711	(Estonia) Lucas Leok	Husqvarna
729	(Poland) Michał Psiuk	KTM
734	(Latvia) Denijs Bogdanovs	KTM
742	(Estonia) Enri Lustus	Husqvarna
757	(Latvia) Toms Dankerts	KTM
789	(Ukraine) Ostap Andrukh	KTM

=== Riders Championship ===
Pos	Rider	Motorcycle	SAR (Sardinia)		Points
1	(Estonia) Lucas Leok	Husqvarna	1	2	47
2	(Netherlands) Dex van den Broek	KTM	3	1	45
3	(Finland) Viktor Leppälä	Yamaha	2	3	42
4	(Poland) Michał Psiuk	KTM	4	4	36
5	(Netherlands) Jenairo Beerens	KTM	5	7	30
6	(Estonia) Aston Allas	Husqvarna	8	6	28
7	(Denmark) Storm Maymann	Yamaha	7	9	26
8	(Austria) Ricardo Bauer	KTM	13	8	21
9	(Bulgaria) Dani Tsankov	Yamaha	12	10	20
10	(Latvia) Toms Dankerts	KTM	11	11	20
11	(Italy) Andrea Uccellini	Husqvarna	10	12	20
12	(France) Sleny Goyer	Gas Gas	21	5	16
13	(Hungary) Áron Katona	Husqvarna	6	31	15
14	(Netherlands) Kenzo Jaspers	Husqvarna	15	15	12
15	(Austria) Moritz Ernecker	Gas Gas	9	21	12
16	(Belgium) Torre Van Mechgelen	KTM	16	17	9
17	(Ukraine) Ostap Andrukh	KTM	32	13	8
18	(Estonia) Enri Lustus	Husqvarna	14	20	8
19	(Spain) Iker Diez	Yamaha	24	14	7
20	(Belarus) Aliaksandr Frydlender	KTM	20	16	6
21	(United Kingdom) Elvis Totney	KTM	18	19	5
22	(France) Tylan Lagain	Yamaha	17	23	4
23	(Spain) Juan Izaguirre	Husqvarna	29	18	3
24	(Slovakia) Maxim Zimmerman	Husqvarna	19	27	2
	(Netherlands) Chento van Zoest	KTM	23	22	0
	(Latvia) Denijs Bogdanovs	KTM	22	Ret	0
	(Spain) José María Hernández	KTM	28	24	0
	(Spain) Benigno García Sánchez	KTM	26	25	0
	(Netherlands) Teunis Spijkerman	Gas Gas	25	26	0
	(Sweden) Dante Lantz	Husqvarna	27	29	0
	(Romania) Sami Dumitru	Yamaha	31	28	0
	(Czech Republic) Hugo Brant	KTM	30	30	0
	(Czech Republic) Stanislav Pojar	KTM	Ret	32	0
	(Romania) Tudor Balaban	Yamaha	33	33	0
	(Serbia) Vuk Čajić	Husqvarna	34	34	0
Pos	Rider	Motorcycle	SAR (Sardinia)		Points
