= Baseball at the 1951 Pan American Games =

- Venue: Buenos Aires, Argentina
- Competitors: 8 teams

Medalists
Gold medal	Cuba
Silver medal	United States
Bronze medal	Mexico

Baseball at the 1951 Pan American Games was contested between eight national teams representing Argentina, Brazil, Colombia, Cuba, Mexico, Nicaragua, United States, and Venezuela in the first edition of the Pan American Games held in Buenos Aires, Argentina.

Cuba won the gold medal after finishing the tournament in first place with a 6–1 record losing only to Venezuela. United States and Mexico finished tied with a 5–2 record, but the United States defeated Mexico during the round robin and was awarded the silver medal while the Mexican team was awarded the bronze medal.

== Medal summary ==
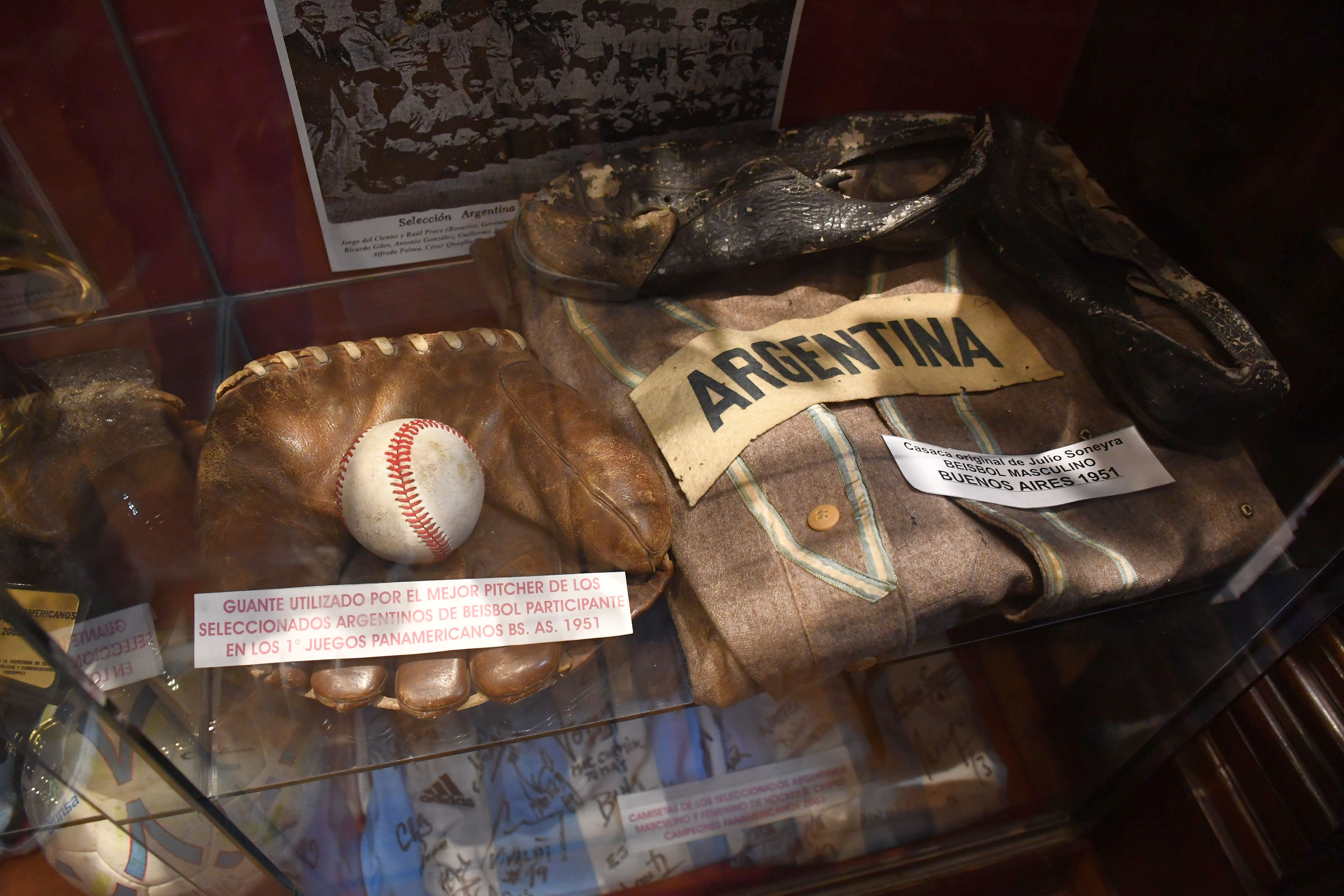
Uniform and gloves used by the Argentine team.

=== Medal table ===
Rank	Nation	Gold	Silver	Bronze	Total
1	Cuba	1	0	0	1
2	United States	0	1	0	1
3	Mexico	0	0	1	1
Totals (3 entries)		1	1	1	3

=== Medalists ===
Event	Gold	Silver	Bronze
Men's	Cuba: Juan Izaguirre; Angel Scull; Derubin Jácome; Juan Vistuer; Angelio Brito; Luís Fiuza; Leonardo Feijo; Aurélio Herrera; Juan Ravelo; Gustavo Martínez; Osvaldo Orgalles; Marío Díaz; Nélson Campbell; Jorge Silva; Gilberto Delgado; Celso Oviedo; Manager: Fabio de la Torre	United States: Alton "Tunney" Brooks; Bob Coluni; Max Eller; Junie Floyd; Stanley Johnson; Jack Liptak; Dick McCleney; Ellsworth "Kay" Rogers; Jack Stallings; Wiley Warren; Frank Wehner; Don Woodlief; Manager: Taylor Sanford	Mexico: Antonio Mondragon; R. de Hoyos; G. Figueroa; Manuel Contreras; Nicolas Genestas; H. Leal; R. López Ortíz; J. Sánchez; A. Uribe; R. Delgado; Sabino García; A. Méndez; R. Cárdenas; M. López Ortíz; A. Flores; J. López Ruíz; Fernando García; Alberto Sosa; Manager: Chile Gómez

The Wake Forest Demon Deacons baseball team represented the United States in the competition.

== Results ==
Pos	Team	Pld	W	L	RF	RA	RD	PCT	GB	CUB	USA	MEX	NCA	VEN	COL	BRA	ARG
1	Cuba	7	6	1	68	15	+53	.857	—		8–1	3–0	6–5	3–4	5–2	25–3	18–0
2	United States	7	5	2	85	37	+48	.714	1	1–8		9–3	8–9	8–5	7–5	23–4	29–3
3	Mexico	7	5	2	56	30	+26	.714	1	0–3	3–9		4–2	8–1	6–5	16–5	19–5
4	Nicaragua	7	4	3	52	32	+20	.571	2	5–6	9–8	2–4		8–6	4–5	10–1	14–2
5	Venezuela	7	4	3	76	30	+46	.571	2	4–3	5–8	1–8	6–8		7–2	22–1	31–0
6	Colombia	7	3	4	42	36	+6	.429	3	2–5	5–7	5–6	5–4	2–7		5–3	18–4
7	Brazil	7	1	6	25	107	−82	.143	5	3–25	4–23	5–16	1–10	1–22	3–5		8–6
8	Argentina (H)	7	0	7	20	137	−117	.000	6	0–18	3–29	5–19	2–14	0–31	4–18	6–8	

Source: Panam Sports
(H) Hosts

== Sources ==
- Olderr, Steven (2009). The Pan American Games: A Statistical History, 1951-1999, bilingual edition. McFarland & Company. ISBN 978-0786443369. ISBN 9780786443369.
