= 1950 Amateur World Series =

Tournament details
- Country: Nicaragua
- Teams: 10
- Defending champions: Dominican Republic

Final positions
- Champions: Cuba
- Runners-up: Dominican Republic
- Third place: Venezuela
- Fourth place: Panama

Awards
- MVP: (Cuba) Juan Izaguirre

The 1950 Amateur World Series was the 11th Amateur World Series (AWS), an international men's amateur baseball tournament. The tournament was sanctioned by the International Baseball Federation (which titled it the Baseball World Cup as of the 1988 tournament). The tournament took place, for the second time, in Nicaragua, which had also hosted the previous (1948) tournament.

Cuba won their fifth AWS title, taking the gold in 1950.

== Final standings ==
Rk	Team	W	L	
1	Cuba	10	1	Gold medal
2	Dominican Republic	9	2	Silver medal
3	Venezuela	9	2	Bronze medal
4	Panama	8	3	
5	Nicaragua	7	4	
6	Colombia	6	5	
7	Mexico	6	5	
8	Puerto Rico	5	6	
9	El Salvador	3	8	
10	Guatemala	2	9	
11	Costa Rica	2	9	
12	Honduras	0	11	
