= Pablo Gutiérrez =

Spanish writer

Pablo Gutiérrez is a Spanish writer. He studied journalism in Seville but now works as a school teacher in Cádiz.

He published his first book Rosas, restos de alas y otros relatos in 2008, and won the "Tormenta en un vaso" prize. He has since published several more books, the most recent of which is La tercera clase (2023).

Gutierrez has also written for the theatre. His 2001 play Carne de cerdo was a finalist for the Miguel Romero Esteo Prize for Playwriting.

In 2010, he was named by Granta magazine as one of the best young writers in the Spanish language.

== Books ==
- Rosas, restos de alas y otros relatos (2008, La Fábrica).
- Nada es crucial (2010, Lengua de Trapo).
- Ensimismada correspondencia (2012, Lengua de Trapo).
- Democracia (2012, Seix Barral).
- Los libros repentinos (2015, Seix Barral)
- Cabezas cortadas (2018, Seix Barral)
- El síndrome de Bergerac (2020, Edebé)
- La tercera clase (2023, La navaja suiza)

== Theatre ==
- Carne de cerdo (2001, Junta de Andalucía)
