= Juan Izaguirre =

Cuban baseball player

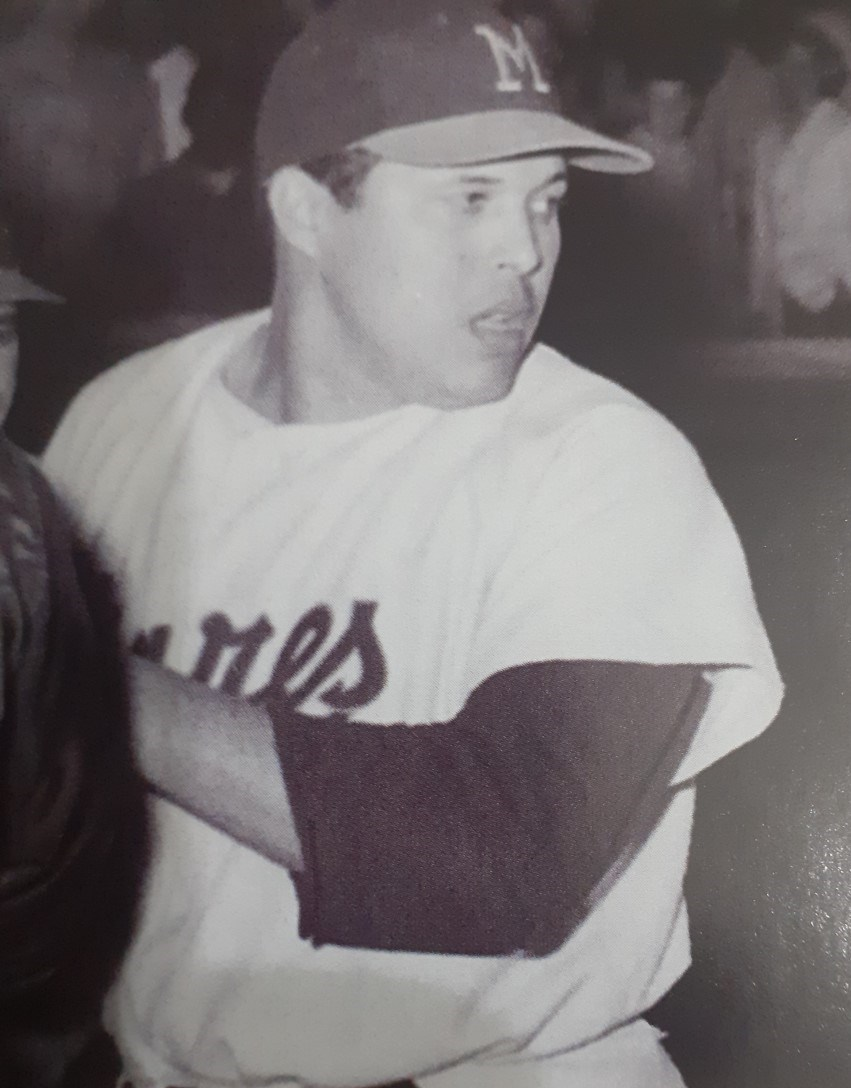
- Catcher / infielder
- Born: 1929; Havana, Cuba
- Died: April 11, 2017 (aged 87–88)
- Batted: Right Threw: Right

Career highlights and awards
- Amateur World Series MVP (1950)
Medals
Representing Cuba
Men's baseball
Baseball World Cup
Silver medal – second place	1950 Managua	Team
Pan American Games
Gold medal – first place	1951 Buenos Aires	Team

Juan Izaguirre (1929 – April 11, 2017) was a Cuban baseball player. He is best known for playing with the Cuba national baseball team at the 1950 Amateur World Series in Caracas, where he was named the tournament's most valuable player.

Izaguirre played in the Cuban Amateur League from 1947 to 1951 with the Corredores de Aduana ("Customs") club. He was one of the first non-white players to compete the league (though René Solís is considered the first). With the Cuba national baseball team, Izaguirre competed at the 1950 Amateur World Series, where he led the tournament in runs scored (16), home runs (4) and runs batted in (21). He also played at the 1951 Pan American Games, where he led the tournament in hits (13).

He went professional with the Havana Cubans of the Florida International League in 1951, batting .241 over 82 games. The next year, he played in the Gulf Coast League, and would play three seasons with the Crowley Millers in the Evangeline League (1953–1955). In 1956 and 1957, he played in the Southwestern League. Izaguirre also played with Tigres de Marianao in the Cuban Winter League, appearing with them at the 1958 Caribbean Series, which Marianao won.

Izaguirre later served as a coach for Industriales in the Cuban National Series, mentoring pitchers like René Arocha and Lázaro Valle. In his old age, he appeared at various old timers exhibition events in Miami.
