= 2022 Motocross des Nations =

2022 edition of Motocross des Nations

The 2022 Motocross des Nations was a motocross race held on 24 and 25 November 2022 in Buchanan, United States. This was the fifth time that the event was held in the United States and the second time at this track. Italy went into the event as the defending champions after winning their third title in 2021.

== Entry list ==
Start numbers were allocated based on the team finishes from the 2021 competition. This allocated number plates 1, 2 & 3 to Italy (1st), 4, 5 & 6 to the Netherlands (2nd) and 7, 8 & 9 to the United Kingdom (3rd). Russia, who finished fourth in the 2021 competition, was not allowed to compete after the FIM suspended all Russian competitors following the 2022 Russian invasion of Ukraine.

The official entry list was published on 1 September.

Thirty-four teams competed at the event, three more than in the previous edition. Of these teams, 19 competed in 2021, with increasing travel costs seeing many of the smaller European countries unable to attend. In addition to Russia, Austria and Denmark who finished 9th and 10th in the previous edition, made it 3 of the top-10 countries missing for 2022. Czech Republic, Bulgaria, Poland, Slovenia, Slovakia, Croatia, Portugal, Ukraine and Greece were the other nations absent from 2021. Slovenia not attending meant that 2022 MXGP world champion Tim Gajser would not race, whilst Portugal missed the event for the first time since 1993.

However, many countries made their return to the event after being absent in 2021 due to COVID-19 restrictions. Home nation United States returned for the first time since 2019, so did Australia, Brazil, Japan, New Zealand and Norway. Mexico appeared for the first time since the 2018 edition, the last to be held in the U.S., as were the Philippines (making their third appearance) and Israel. Ecuador made their third appearance, their last being in 2010, as was Chile, whose last event came in 2007. Guam and Honduras made their debuts at the Motocross des Nations in 2022.

To round out the entry list, two combined teams appeared for the first time, organised by two of the FIM's continental federations, with the intention of fielding riders from smaller nations who cannot afford to send a full team. FIM Latin America hosts riders from Bolivia, Costa Rica and the Dominican Republic, which meant the first appearance of a Bolivian rider at the MXDN. FIM Europe meanwhile hosted riders from Hungary, Czech Republic and Ukraine.

	Country	Nr	Rider	Class	Motorcycle
1	Italy	1	Tony Cairoli	MXGP	KTM
1	Italy	2	Andrea Adamo	MX2	Gas Gas
1	Italy	3	Mattia Guadagnini	Open	Gas Gas
2	Netherlands	4	Glenn Coldenhoff	MXGP	Yamaha
2	Netherlands	5	Kay de Wolf	MX2	Husqvarna
2	Netherlands	6	Calvin Vlaanderen	Open	Yamaha
3	(United Kingdom) Great Britain	7	Dean Wilson	MXGP	Husqvarna
3	(United Kingdom) Great Britain	8	Max Anstie	MX2	Honda
3	(United Kingdom) Great Britain	9	Tommy Searle	Open	Honda
4	France	13	Maxime Renaux	MXGP	Yamaha
4	France	14	Marvin Musquin	MX2	KTM
4	France	15	Dylan Ferrandis	Open	Yamaha
5	Belgium	16	Jago Geerts	MXGP	Yamaha
5	Belgium	17	Liam Everts	MX2	KTM
5	Belgium	18	Jeremy Van Horebeek	Open	Beta
6	Estonia	19	Tanel Leok	MXGP	Husqvarna
6	Estonia	20	Jörgen-Matthias Talviku	MX2	Husqvarna
6	Estonia	21	Harri Kullas	Open	Yamaha
7	Switzerland	22	Jeremy Seewer	MXGP	Yamaha
7	Switzerland	23	Valentin Guillod	MX2	Yamaha
7	Switzerland	24	Kevin Brumann	Open	Yamaha
8	Germany	31	Max Nagl	MXGP	Husqvarna
8	Germany	32	Simon Längenfelder	MX2	Gas Gas
8	Germany	33	Tom Koch	Open	KTM
9	Finland	34	Miro Sihvonen	MXGP	Honda
9	Finland	35	Emil Weckman	MX2	Honda
9	Finland	36	Jere Haavisto	Open	KTM
10	Lithuania	37	Domantas Jazdauskas	MXGP	Gas Gas
10	Lithuania	38	Dovydas Karka	MX2	Yamaha
10	Lithuania	39	Arminas Jasikonis	Open	Yamaha
11	Canada	40	Dylan Wright	MXGP	Honda
11	Canada	41	Ryder McNabb	MX2	Honda
11	Canada	42	Tyler Medaglia	Open	Gas Gas
12	Latvia	43	Kārlis Sabulis	MXGP	Husqvarna
12	Latvia	44	Kārlis Reišulis	MX2	Yamaha
12	Latvia	45	Toms Macuks	Open	KTM
13	Spain	46	Jorge Prado	MXGP	Gas Gas
13	Spain	47	Guillem Farrés	MX2	Yamaha
13	Spain	48	Rubén Fernández	Open	Honda
14	Sweden	55	Alvin Östlund	MXGP	Yamaha
14	Sweden	56	Albin Gerhardsson	MX2	Husqvarna
14	Sweden	57	Fredrik Norén	Open	KTM
15	South Africa	58	Tristan Purdon	MXGP	KTM
15	South Africa	59	Camden McLellan	MX2	KTM
15	South Africa	60	Cameron Durow	Open	KTM
16	(Republic of Ireland) Ireland	64	Martin Barr	MXGP	Husqvarna
16	(Republic of Ireland) Ireland	65	John Meara	MX2	KTM
16	(Republic of Ireland) Ireland	66	Stuart Edmonds	Open	Husqvarna
17	Venezuela	67	Anthony Rodríguez	MXGP	Honda
17	Venezuela	68	Raimundo Trasolini	MX2	KTM
17	Venezuela	69	Lorenzo Locurcio	Open	KTM
18	Iceland	85	Gunnlaugur Karlsson	MXGP	Husqvarna
18	Iceland	86	Eiður Orri Pálmarsson	MX2	Yamaha
18	Iceland	87	Eyþór Reynisson	Open	Yamaha
19	Morocco	91	Anwar Hachti	MXGP	Kawasaki
19	Morocco	92	Saad Soulimani	MX2	Kawasaki
19	Morocco	93	Houmame Gabari	Open	Kawasaki
20	Norway	94	Cornelius Tøndel	MXGP	Fantic
20	Norway	95	Kevin Horgmo	MX2	Kawasaki
20	Norway	96	Håkon Østerhagen	Open	Fantic
21	Japan	97	Yuki Okura	MXGP	Honda
21	Japan	98	Jo Shimoda	MX2	Kawasaki
21	Japan	99	Kota Toriyabe	Open	Yamaha
22	United States	101	Eli Tomac	MXGP	Yamaha
22	United States	102	Justin Cooper	MX2	Yamaha
22	United States	103	Chase Sexton	Open	Honda
23	Mexico	104	Félix López	MXGP	Husqvarna
23	Mexico	105	Arturo Humberto Fierro	MX2	Kawasaki
23	Mexico	106	Jorge Rubalcava	Open	Husqvarna
24	Guam	107	Benny Bloss	MXGP	KTM
24	Guam	108	Joshua Varize	MX2	KTM
24	Guam	109	Sean Lipanovich	Open	KTM
25	Chile	110	Matías Pavez	MXGP	Kawasaki
25	Chile	111	Hardy Muñoz	MX2	Kawasaki
25	Chile	112	Benjamín Garib	Open	Yamaha
26	Australia	113	Mitchell Evans	MXGP	Honda
26	Australia	114	Hunter Lawrence	MX2	Honda
26	Australia	115	Jett Lawrence	Open	Honda
27	Philippines	116	Rhowell Mangosong	MXGP	Yamaha
27	Philippines	117	Polini Francisco	MX2	Husqvarna
27	Philippines	118	Ralph Ramento	Open	Kawasaki
28	New Zealand	119	Josiah Natzke	MXGP	Kawasaki
28	New Zealand	120	Brodie Connolly	MX2	Yamaha
28	New Zealand	121	Rhys Carter	Open	Yamaha
29	Ecuador	122	Miguel Cordovez	MXGP	Kawasaki
29	Ecuador	123	Pedro Suárez	MX2	Kawasaki
29	Ecuador	124	Pablo Vivanco	Open	Kawasaki
30	Honduras	125	Cristian Fernández	MXGP	KTM
30	Honduras	126	Gerhard Matamoros	MX2	KTM
30	Honduras	127	José Fernández	Open	KTM
31	Brazil	128	Gabriel Gutierres	MXGP	KTM
31	Brazil	129	Enzo Lopes	MX2	Yamaha
31	Brazil	130	Ramyller Alves	Open	Husqvarna
32	Israel	131	Gleb Furmanov	MXGP	KTM
32	Israel	132	Stav Orland	MX2	Husqvarna
32	Israel	133	Ilay Ben Dahan	Open	Kawasaki
33	FIM Latin America	134	(Bolivia) Marco Antezana	MXGP	KTM
33	FIM Latin America	135	(Costa Rica) Yarod Vargas	MX2	KTM
33	FIM Latin America	136	(Dominican Republic) Franklin Noguera	Open	Gas Gas
34	FIM Europe	137	(Ukraine) Pavlo Kizlyak	MXGP	KTM
34	FIM Europe	138	(Czech Republic) Julius Mikula	MX2	KTM
34	FIM Europe	139	(Hungary) Noel Zanócz	Open	Husqvarna

== Qualifying Races ==
Qualifying is run on a class by class basis. Top 19 countries after qualifying go directly to the main Motocross des Nations races. The remaining countries go to a smaller final. Best 2 scores count.

=== MXGP ===
Place	Nr	Rider	Motorcycle	Laps	Gap
1	16	(Belgium) Jago Geerts	Yamaha	11	
2	101	(United States) Eli Tomac	Yamaha	11	+3.478
3	22	(Switzerland) Jeremy Seewer	Yamaha	11	+4.209
4	113	(Australia) Mitchell Evans	Honda	11	+16.694
5	46	(Spain) Jorge Prado	Gas Gas	11	+17.469
6	4	(Netherlands) Glenn Coldenhoff	Yamaha	11	+31.722
7	13	(France) Maxime Renaux	Yamaha	11	+44.095
8	7	(United Kingdom) Dean Wilson	Husqvarna	11	+50.440
9	1	(Italy) Tony Cairoli	KTM	11	+50.957
10	40	(Canada) Dylan Wright	Honda	11	+52.524
11	94	(Norway) Cornelius Tøndel	Fantic	11	+54.962
12	31	(Germany) Max Nagl	Husqvarna	11	+56.879
13	55	(Sweden) Alvin Östlund	Yamaha	11	+59.745
14	107	(Guam) Benny Bloss	KTM	11	+1:10.646
15	19	(Estonia) Tanel Leok	Husqvarna	11	+1:22.387
16	104	(Mexico) Félix López	Husqvarna	11	+1:25.680
17	119	(New Zealand) Josiah Natzke	Kawasaki	11	+1:49.688
18	43	(Latvia) Kārlis Sabulis	Husqvarna	11	+1:52.281
19	58	(South Africa) Tristan Purdon	KTM	11	+2:01.622
20	37	(Lithuania) Domantas Jazdauskas	Gas Gas	11	+2:12.426
21	122	(Ecuador) Miguel Cordovez	Kawasaki	11	+2:20.841
22	34	(Finland) Miro Sihvonen	Honda	10	+1 Lap
23	64	(Republic of Ireland) Martin Barr	Husqvarna	10	+1 Lap
24	97	(Japan) Yuki Okura	Honda	10	+1 Lap
25	115	(Bolivia) Marco Antezana	Kawasaki	10	+1 Lap
26	110	(Chile) Matías Pavez	Kawasaki	10	+1 Lap
27	128	(Brazil) Gabriel Gutierres	KTM	9	+2 Lap
28	131	(Israel) Gleb Furmanov	KTM	9	+2 Lap
29	85	(Iceland) Gunnlaugur Karlsson	Husqvarna	9	+2 Lap
30	116	(Philippines) Rhowell Mangosong	Yamaha	9	+2 Lap
31	125	(Honduras) Cristian Fernández	KTM	7	+4 Lap
32	91	(Morocco) Anwar Hachti	Kawasaki	0	+11 Lap
33	67	(Venezuela) Anthony Rodríguez	Honda	0	+11 Lap

=== MX2 ===
Place	Nr	Rider	Motorcycle	Laps	Gap
1	102	(United States) Justin Cooper	Yamaha	11	
2	114	(Australia) Hunter Lawrence	Honda	11	+18.809
3	14	(France) Marvin Musquin	KTM	11	+11.509
4	47	(Spain) Guillem Farrés	Yamaha	11	+42.120
5	2	(Italy) Andrea Adamo	Gas Gas	11	+51.804
6	32	(Germany) Simon Längenfelder	Gas Gas	11	+52.922
7	17	(Belgium) Liam Everts	KTM	11	+53.165
8	111	(Chile) Hardy Muñoz	Kawasaki	11	+58.965
9	95	(Norway) Kevin Horgmo	Kawasaki	11	+1:00.273
10	108	(Guam) Joshua Varize	KTM	11	+1:12.932
11	35	(Finland) Emil Weckman	Honda	11	+1:15.587
12	98	(Japan) Jo Shimoda	Kawasaki	11	+1:16.025
13	59	(South Africa) Camden McLellan	KTM	11	+1:16.534
14	56	(Sweden) Albin Gerhardsson	Husqvarna	11	+1:23.608
15	44	(Latvia) Kārlis Reišulis	Yamaha	11	+1:26.346
16	41	(Canada) Ryder McNabb	Honda	11	+1:29.238
17	65	(Republic of Ireland) John Meara	KTM	11	+1:46.878
18	8	(United Kingdom) Max Anstie	Honda	11	+1:51.073
19	5	(Netherlands) Kay de Wolf	Husqvarna	10	+1 Lap
20	92	(Morocco) Saad Soulimani	Kawasaki	10	+1 Lap
21	38	(Lithuania) Dovydas Karka	Yamaha	10	+1 Lap
22	126	(Honduras) Gerhard Matamoros	KTM	10	+1 Lap
23	68	(Venezuela) Raimundo Trasolini	KTM	10	+1 Lap
24	86	(Iceland) Eiður Orri Pálmarsson	Yamaha	10	+1 Lap
25	135	(Costa Rica) Yarod Vargas	KTM	10	+1 Lap
26	132	(Israel) Stav Orland	Husqvarna	10	+1 Lap
27	117	(Philippines) Polini Francisco	Husqvarna	9	+2 Lap
28	138	(Czech Republic) Julius Mikula	KTM	9	+2 Lap
29	114	(New Zealand) Brodie Connolly	Yamaha	5	+6 Lap
30	105	(Mexico) Arturo Humberto Fierro	Kawasaki	5	+6 Lap
31	23	(Switzerland) Valentin Guillod	Yamaha	0	+11 Laps
32	123	(Ecuador) Pedro Suárez	Kawasaki	0	+11 Laps

=== Open ===
Place	Nr	Rider	Motorcycle	Laps	Gap
1	15	(France) Dylan Ferrandis	Yamaha	11	
2	103	(United States) Chase Sexton	Honda	11	+18.809
3	115	(Australia) Jett Lawrence	Honda	11	+11.509
4	47	(Spain) Rubén Fernández	Honda	11	+42.120
5	6	(Netherlands) Calvin Vlaanderen	Yamaha	11	+51.804
6	21	(Estonia) Harri Kullas	Yamaha	11	+52.922
7	57	(Sweden) Fredrik Norén	KTM	11	+53.165
8	3	(Italy) Mattia Guadagnini	Gas Gas	11	+58.965
9	69	(Venezuela) Lorenzo Locurcio	KTM	11	+1:00.273
10	9	(United Kingdom) Tommy Searle	Honda	11	+1:12.932
11	24	(Switzerland) Kevin Brumann	Yamaha	11	+1:15.587
12	18	(Belgium) Jeremy Van Horebeek	Beta	11	+1:16.025
13	33	(Germany) Tom Koch	KTM	11	+1:16.534
14	45	(Latvia) Toms Macuks	KTM	11	+1:23.608
15	36	(Finland) Jere Haavisto	KTM	11	+1:26.346
16	66	(Republic of Ireland) Stuart Edmonds	Husqvarna	11	+1:29.238
17	112	(Chile) Benjamín Garib	Yamaha	11	+1:46.878
18	136	(Dominican Republic) Franklin Noguera	Gas Gas	11	+1:51.073
19	130	(Brazil) Ramyller Alves	Husqvarna	10	+1 Lap
20	42	(Canada) Tyler Medaglia	Gas Gas	10	+1 Lap
21	121	(New Zealand) Rhys Carter	Yamaha	10	+1 Lap
22	60	(South Africa) Cameron Durow	KTM	10	+1 Lap
23	109	(Guam) Sean Lipanovich	KTM	10	+1 Lap
24	99	(Japan) Kota Toriyabe	Yamaha	10	+1 Lap
25	139	(Hungary) Noel Zanócz	Husqvarna	10	+1 Lap
26	106	(Mexico) Jorge Rubalcava	Husqvarna	10	+1 Lap
27	87	(Iceland) Eyþór Reynisson	Yamaha	10	+1 Lap
28	124	(Ecuador) Pablo Vivanco	Kawasaki	10	+1 Lap
29	39	(Lithuania) Arminas Jasikonis	Yamaha	9	+2 Laps
30	127	(Honduras) José Fernández	KTM	9	+2 Laps
31	33	(Israel) Ilay Ben Dahan	Kawasaki	9	+2 Laps
32	93	(Morocco) Houmame Gabari	Kawasaki	4	+7 Laps
33	96	(Norway) Håkon Østerhagen	Fantic	0	+11 Laps

=== Qualification Standings ===
- Qualified Nations

Place	Nation	Points
1	United States	3
2	France	4
3	Australia	5
4	Spain	8
5	Belgium	8
6	Netherlands	11
7	Italy	13
8	Switzerland	14
9	Germany	18
10	United Kingdom	18
11	Sweden	20
12	Norway	20
13	Estonia	21
14	Guam	24
15	Chile	25
16	Canada	26
17	Finland	26
18	Latvia	29
19	South Africa	32

== Motocross des Nations races ==
The main Motocross des Nations races consist of 3 races which combine two classes together in each. Lowest score wins with each nation allowed to drop their worst score after the final race.

=== MXGP+MX2 ===
Place	Nr	Rider	Motorcycle	Laps	Gap
1	101	(United States) Eli Tomac	Yamaha	15	
2	16	(Belgium) Jago Geerts	Yamaha	15	+3.243
3	13	(France) Maxime Renaux	Yamaha	15	+58.986
4	18	(Switzerland) Jeremy Seewer	Yamaha	15	+1:11.659
5	113	(Australia) Mitchell Evans	Honda	15	+1:24.846
6	46	(Spain) Jorge Prado	Gas Gas	15	+1:29.402
7	1	(Italy) Tony Cairoli	KTM	15	+1:33.403
8	114	(Australia) Hunter Lawrence	Honda	15	+1:34.431
9	102	(United States) Justin Cooper	Yamaha	15	+1:48.130
10	5	(Netherlands) Kay de Wolf	Husqvarna	15	+1:56.440
11	31	(Germany) Max Nagl	Husqvarna	15	+2:09.756
12	17	(Belgium) Liam Everts	KTM	15	+2:22.408
13	4	(Netherlands) Glenn Coldenhoff	Yamaha	14	+1 Lap
14	14	(France) Marvin Musquin	KTM	14	+1 Lap
15	2	(Italy) Andrea Adamo	Gas Gas	14	+1 Lap
16	7	(United Kingdom) Dean Wilson	Husqvarna	14	+1 Lap
17	32	(Germany) Simon Längenfelder	Gas Gas	14	+1 Lap
18	95	(Norway) Kevin Horgmo	Kawasaki	14	+1 Lap
19	55	(Sweden) Alvin Östlund	Yamaha	14	+1 Lap
20	43	(Latvia) Kārlis Sabulis	Husqvarna	14	+1 Lap
21	59	(South Africa) Camden McLellan	KTM	14	+1 Lap
22	94	(Norway) Cornelius Tøndel	Fantic	14	+1 Lap
23	44	(Latvia) Kārlis Reišulis	Yamaha	14	+1 Lap
24	35	(Finland) Emil Weckman	Honda	14	+1 Lap
25	47	(Spain) Guillem Farrés	Yamaha	14	+1 Lap
26	56	(Sweden) Albin Gerhardsson	Husqvarna	14	+1 Lap
27	111	(Chile) Hardy Muñoz	Kawasaki	14	+1 Lap
28	34	(Finland) Miro Sihvonen	Honda	14	+1 Lap
29	108	(Guam) Joshua Varize	KTM	14	+1 Lap
30	41	(Canada) Ryder McNabb	Honda	14	+1 Lap
31	40	(Canada) Dylan Wright	Honda	13	+2 Laps
32	110	(Chile) Matías Pavez	Kawasaki	13	+2 Laps
33	68	(Venezuela) Raimundo Trasolini	KTM	12	+3 Laps
34	107	(Guam) Benny Bloss	KTM	10	+5 Laps
35	19	(Estonia) Tanel Leok	Husqvarna	8	+7 Laps
36	23	(Switzerland) Valentin Guillod	Yamaha	8	+7 Laps
37	8	(United Kingdom) Max Anstie	Honda	7	+8 Laps
38	58	(South Africa) Tristan Purdon	KTM	5	+10 Laps
39	67	(Venezuela) Anthony Rodríguez	Honda	1	+14 Laps
	20	(Estonia) Jörgen-Matthias Talviku	Husqvarna	0	Did Not Start
Place	Nr	Rider	Motorcycle	Laps	Gap

=== MX2+Open ===
Place	Nr	Rider	Motorcycle	Laps	Gap
1	115	(Australia) Jett Lawrence	Honda	15	
2	103	(United States) Chase Sexton	Honda	15	+14.240
3	3	(Italy) Mattia Guadagnini	Gas Gas	15	+20.238
4	102	(United States) Justin Cooper	Yamaha	15	+22.058
5	48	(Spain) Rubén Fernández	Honda	15	+25.555
6	15	(France) Dylan Ferrandis	Yamaha	15	+31.445
7	6	(Netherlands) Calvin Vlaanderen	Yamaha	15	+1:05.933
8	21	(Estonia) Harri Kullas	Yamaha	15	+1:11.398
9	14	(France) Marvin Musquin	KTM	15	+1:13.503
10	114	(Australia) Hunter Lawrence	Honda	15	+1:18.053
11	32	(Germany) Simon Längenfelder	Gas Gas	15	+1:28.333
12	111	(Chile) Hardy Muñoz	Kawasaki	15	+1:38.168
13	17	(Belgium) Jeremy Van Horebeek	Beta	15	+1:43.002
14	17	(Belgium) Liam Everts	KTM	15	+1:48.754
15	2	(Italy) Andrea Adamo	Gas Gas	15	+2:08.533
16	33	(Germany) Tom Koch	KTM	15	+2:10.844
17	9	(United Kingdom) Tommy Searle	Honda	14	+1 Lap
18	5	(Netherlands) Kay de Wolf	Husqvarna	14	+1 Lap
19	56	(Sweden) Albin Gerhardsson	Husqvarna	14	+1 Lap
20	108	(Guam) Joshua Varize	KTM	14	+1 Lap
21	35	(Finland) Emil Weckman	Honda	14	+1 Lap
22	45	(Latvia) Toms Macuks	KTM	14	+1 Lap
23	44	(Latvia) Kārlis Reišulis	Yamaha	14	+1 Lap
24	57	(Sweden) Fredrik Norén	KTM	14	+1 Lap
25	96	(Norway) Håkon Østerhagen	Fantic	14	+1 Lap
26	112	(Chile) Benjamin Garib	Yamaha	14	+1 Lap
27	47	(Spain) Guillem Farrés	Yamaha	14	+1 Lap
28	23	(Switzerland) Valentin Guillod	Yamaha	14	+1 Lap
29	42	(Canada) Tyler Medaglia	Gas Gas	14	+1 Lap
30	8	(United Kingdom) Max Anstie	Honda	14	+1 Lap
31	24	(Switzerland) Kevin Brumann	Yamaha	13	+2 Laps
32	109	(Guam) Sean Lipanovich	KTM	13	+2 Laps
33	36	(Finland) Jere Haavisto	KTM	13	+2 Laps
34	96	(Norway) Kevin Horgmo	Kawasaki	12	+3 Laps
35	60	(South Africa) Cameron Durow	KTM	10	+5 Laps
36	69	(Venezuela) Lorenzo Locurcio	KTM	6	+9 Laps
37	59	(South Africa) Camden McLellan	KTM	4	+11 Laps
	20	(Estonia) Jörgen-Matthias Talviku	Husqvarna	0	Did Not Start
	41	(Canada) Ryder McNabb	Honda	0	Did Not Start
	68	(Venezuela) Raimundo Trasolini	KTM	0	Did Not Start
Place	Nr	Rider	Motorcycle	Laps	Gap

=== MXGP+Open ===
Place	Nr	Rider	Motorcycle	Laps	Gap
1	13	(France) Maxime Renaux	Yamaha	15	
2	115	(Australia) Jett Lawrence	Honda	15	+4.600
3	103	(United States) Chase Sexton	Honda	15	+8.303
4	15	(France) Dylan Ferrandis	Yamaha	15	+17.408
5	22	(Switzerland) Jeremy Seewer	Yamaha	15	+19.507
6	101	(United States) Eli Tomac	Yamaha	15	+52.551
7	46	(Spain) Jorge Prado	Gas Gas	15	+1:02.266
8	48	(Spain) Rubén Fernández	Honda	15	+1:18.847
9	1	(Italy) Tony Cairoli	KTM	15	+1:31.044
10	40	(Canada) Dylan Wright	Honda	15	+1:40.392
11	16	(Belgium) Jago Geerts	Yamaha	15	+2:04.004
12	18	(Belgium) Jeremy Van Horebeek	Beta	15	+2:18.563
13	43	(Latvia) Kārlis Sabulis	Husqvarna	15	+2:22.458
14	6	(Netherlands) Calvin Vlaanderen	Yamaha	15	+2:29.656
15	9	(United Kingdom) Tommy Searle	Honda	14	+1 Lap
16	31	(Germany) Max Nagl	Husqvarna	14	+1 Lap
17	21	(Estonia) Harri Kullas	Yamaha	14	+1 Lap
18	33	(Germany) Tom Koch	KTM	14	+1 Lap
19	3	(Italy) Mattia Guadagnini	Gas Gas	14	+1 Lap
20	7	(United Kingdom) Dean Wilson	Husqvarna	14	+1 Lap
21	57	(Sweden) Fredrik Norén	KTM	14	+1 Lap
22	24	(Switzerland) Kevin Brumann	Yamaha	14	+1 Lap
23	45	(Latvia) Toms Macuks	KTM	14	+1 Lap
24	94	(Norway) Cornelius Tøndel	Fantic	14	+1 Lap
25	36	(Finland) Jere Haavisto	KTM	14	+1 Lap
26	34	(Finland) Miro Sihvonen	Honda	14	+1 Lap
27	96	(Norway) Håkon Østerhagen	Fantic	14	+1 Lap
28	113	(Australia) Mitchell Evans	Honda	14	+1 Lap
29	42	(Canada) Tyler Medaglia	Gas Gas	14	+1 Lap
30	58	(South Africa) Tristan Purdon	KTM	14	+1 Lap
31	60	(South Africa) Cameron Durow	KTM	13	+2 Laps
32	109	(Guam) Sean Lipanovich	KTM	13	+2 Laps
33	110	(Chile) Matías Pavez	Kawasaki	13	+2 Laps
34	55	(Sweden) Alvin Östlund	Yamaha	6	+9 Laps
35	107	(Guam) Benny Bloss	KTM	4	+11 Laps
36	4	(Netherlands) Glenn Coldenhoff	Yamaha	3	+12 Laps
37	112	(Chile) Benjamín Garib	Yamaha	0	+15 Laps
38	19	(Estonia) Tanel Leok	Husqvarna	0	+15 Laps
	67	(Venezuela) Anthony Rodríguez	Honda	0	Did Not Start
	69	(Venezuela) Lorenzo Locurcio	KTM	0	Did Not Start
Place	Nr	Rider	Motorcycle	Laps	Gap
