= 2018 FIM Motocross World Championship =

Motocross championship season

The 2018 FIM Motocross World Championship was the 62nd FIM Motocross World Championship season. It included 20 events, started at Neuquen in Argentina on 4 March, and ended at Imola in Italy on 30 September. Jeffrey Herlings dominated the main championship by winning 33 races out of 40, getting on the podium in every race he started.

== Race Calendar and Results ==
A 20-round calendar for the 2018 season was announced on 25 October 2017.

=== MXGP ===
Round	Date	Grand Prix	Location	Race 1 Winner	Race 2 Winner	Round Winner	Report
1	4 March	Argentina	Neuquen	(Italy) Tony Cairoli	(Netherlands) Jeffrey Herlings	(Netherlands) Jeffrey Herlings	Report
2	18 March	Netherlands	Valkenswaard	(Netherlands) Jeffrey Herlings	(Netherlands) Jeffrey Herlings	(Netherlands) Jeffrey Herlings	Report
3	25 March	Spain	Redsand	(Italy) Tony Cairoli	(Italy) Tony Cairoli	(Italy) Tony Cairoli	Report
4	8 April	Italy	Pietramurata	(Netherlands) Jeffrey Herlings	(Netherlands) Jeffrey Herlings	(Netherlands) Jeffrey Herlings	Report
5	15 April	Portugal	Agueda	(Netherlands) Jeffrey Herlings	(Netherlands) Jeffrey Herlings	(Netherlands) Jeffrey Herlings	Report
6	1 May	Russia	Orlyonok	(Belgium) Clément Desalle	(Netherlands) Jeffrey Herlings	(Belgium) Clément Desalle	Report
7	13 May	Latvia	Ķegums	(Netherlands) Jeffrey Herlings	(Netherlands) Jeffrey Herlings	(Netherlands) Jeffrey Herlings	Report
8	20 May	Germany	Teutschenthal	(Netherlands) Jeffrey Herlings	(Netherlands) Jeffrey Herlings	(Netherlands) Jeffrey Herlings	Report
9	3 June	Great Britain	Matterley Basin	(Netherlands) Jeffrey Herlings	(Netherlands) Jeffrey Herlings	(Netherlands) Jeffrey Herlings	Report
10	10 June	France	St Jean d'Angely	(Netherlands) Jeffrey Herlings	(Netherlands) Jeffrey Herlings	(Netherlands) Jeffrey Herlings	Report
11	17 June	Italy	Ottobiano	(Italy) Tony Cairoli	(Italy) Tony Cairoli	(Italy) Tony Cairoli	Report
12	1 July	Indonesia	Pangkalpinang	(Italy) Tony Cairoli	(Netherlands) Jeffrey Herlings	(Netherlands) Jeffrey Herlings	Report
13	8 July	Indonesia	Semarang	(Netherlands) Jeffrey Herlings	(Netherlands) Jeffrey Herlings	(Netherlands) Jeffrey Herlings	Report
14	22 July	Czech Republic	Loket	(Netherlands) Jeffrey Herlings	(Netherlands) Jeffrey Herlings	(Netherlands) Jeffrey Herlings	Report
15	5 August	Belgium	Lommel	(Netherlands) Jeffrey Herlings	(Netherlands) Jeffrey Herlings	(Netherlands) Jeffrey Herlings	Report
16	19 August	Switzerland	Frauenfeld	(Netherlands) Jeffrey Herlings	(Netherlands) Jeffrey Herlings	(Netherlands) Jeffrey Herlings	Report
17	26 August	Bulgaria	Sevlievo	(Netherlands) Jeffrey Herlings	(Netherlands) Jeffrey Herlings	(Netherlands) Jeffrey Herlings	Report
18	2 September	Turkey	Afyon	(Netherlands) Jeffrey Herlings	(Netherlands) Jeffrey Herlings	(Netherlands) Jeffrey Herlings	Report
19	16 September	Netherlands	Assen	(Netherlands) Jeffrey Herlings	(Netherlands) Jeffrey Herlings	(Netherlands) Jeffrey Herlings	Report
20	30 September	Italy	Imola	(Netherlands) Jeffrey Herlings	(Netherlands) Jeffrey Herlings	(Netherlands) Jeffrey Herlings	Report

=== MX2 ===
Round	Date	Grand Prix	Location	Race 1 Winner	Race 2 Winner	Round Winner	Report
1	4 March	Argentina	Neuquen	(Latvia) Pauls Jonass	(Latvia) Pauls Jonass	(Latvia) Pauls Jonass	Report
2	18 March	Netherlands	Valkenswaard	(Latvia) Pauls Jonass	(Latvia) Pauls Jonass	(Latvia) Pauls Jonass	Report
3	25 March	Spain	Redsand	(Latvia) Pauls Jonass	(Latvia) Pauls Jonass	(Latvia) Pauls Jonass	Report
4	8 April	Italy	Pietramurata	(Spain) Jorge Prado	(United States) Thomas Covington	(Spain) Jorge Prado	Report
5	15 April	Portugal	Agueda	(Spain) Jorge Prado	(Spain) Jorge Prado	(Spain) Jorge Prado	Report
6	1 May	Russia	Orlyonok	(Latvia) Pauls Jonass	(Latvia) Pauls Jonass	(Latvia) Pauls Jonass	Report
7	13 May	Latvia	Ķegums	(Denmark) Thomas Kjær Olsen	(Spain) Jorge Prado	(Denmark) Thomas Kjær Olsen	Report
8	20 May	Germany	Teutschenthal	(Latvia) Pauls Jonass	(Spain) Jorge Prado	(Spain) Jorge Prado	Report
9	3 June	Great Britain	Matterley Basin	(Latvia) Pauls Jonass	(Latvia) Pauls Jonass	(Latvia) Pauls Jonass	Report
10	10 June	France	St Jean d'Angely	(United States) Thomas Covington	(Spain) Jorge Prado	(Spain) Jorge Prado	Report
11	17 June	Italy	Ottobiano	(United States) Thomas Covington	(Spain) Jorge Prado	(Spain) Jorge Prado	Report
12	1 July	Indonesia	Pangkalpinang	(United States) Thomas Covington	(South Africa) Calvin Vlaanderen	(South Africa) Calvin Vlaanderen	Report
13	8 July	Indonesia	Semarang	(Latvia) Pauls Jonass	(Spain) Jorge Prado	(Spain) Jorge Prado	Report
14	22 July	Czech Republic	Loket	(South Africa) Calvin Vlaanderen	(Spain) Jorge Prado	(Spain) Jorge Prado	Report
15	5 August	Belgium	Lommel	(Spain) Jorge Prado	(Spain) Jorge Prado	(Spain) Jorge Prado	Report
16	19 August	Switzerland	Frauenfeld	(Latvia) Pauls Jonass	(Spain) Jorge Prado	(Spain) Jorge Prado	Report
17	26 August	Bulgaria	Sevlievo	(Latvia) Pauls Jonass	(Spain) Jorge Prado	(Spain) Jorge Prado	Report
18	2 September	Turkey	Afyon	(United States) Thomas Covington	(Latvia) Pauls Jonass	(United States) Thomas Covington	Report
19	16 September	Netherlands	Assen	(Spain) Jorge Prado	(Spain) Jorge Prado	(Spain) Jorge Prado	Report
20	30 September	Italy	Imola	(Spain) Jorge Prado	(Spain) Jorge Prado	(Spain) Jorge Prado	Report

== MXGP ==
=== Entry list ===
Officially Approved Teams & Riders
Team	Constructor	No	Rider	Rounds
Wilvo Yamaha Official Team MXGP	Yamaha	4	(Switzerland) Arnaud Tonus	
Wilvo Yamaha Official Team MXGP	Yamaha	24	(United Kingdom) Shaun Simpson	1–6, 9–12, 14–20
Wilvo Yamaha Official Team MXGP	Yamaha	91	(Switzerland) Jeremy Seewer	All
Team HRC	Honda	5	(Netherlands) Brian Bogers	19–20
Team HRC	Honda	42	(Australia) Todd Waters	7, 11–18
Team HRC	Honda	243	(Slovenia) Tim Gajser	2–20
Marchetti Racing Team KTM	KTM	6	(France) Benoît Paturel	4–8, 10–11
Marchetti Racing Team KTM	KTM	17	(Spain) José Butrón	1–11, 14–17, 19–20
Marchetti Racing Team KTM	KTM	224	(Italy) Alessandro Brugnoni	16
A1M Husqvarna	Husqvarna	7	(Estonia) Tanel Leok	1–11, 14–17, 19–20
A1M Husqvarna	Husqvarna	291	(Latvia) Matiss Karro	14–15, 19
BOS Project	KTM	9	(Belgium) Ken De Dycker	3–4
BOS Project	Suzuki	777	(Russia) Evgeny Bobryshev	1–16, 19–20
BOS Project	KTM	911	(France) Jordi Tixier	14–15
TM Racing Factory Team	TM	12	(Germany) Max Nagl	1–13, 17, 20
Team SteelsdrJack	KTM	15	(Italy) Davide Bonini	3–4, 8, 16, 20
Rockstar Energy Husqvarna Factory Racing	Husqvarna	21	(France) Gautier Paulin	All
Rockstar Energy Husqvarna Factory Racing	Husqvarna	99	(United Kingdom) Max Anstie	1–4, 6–20
Rockstar Energy Husqvarna Factory Racing	Husqvarna	201	(Belgium) Yentel Martens	15
Standing Construct KTM	KTM	22	(Belgium) Kevin Strijbos	All
Standing Construct KTM	KTM	92	(Switzerland) Valentin Guillod	9–18, 20
Monster Energy Kawasaki Racing Team	Kawasaki	25	(Belgium) Clément Desalle	All
Monster Energy Kawasaki Racing Team	Kawasaki	33	(Belgium) Julien Lieber	1–10, 12–20
Team Honda RedMoto Assomotor	Honda	27	(Lithuania) Arminas Jasikonis	1–10, 12
Team Honda RedMoto Assomotor	Honda	42	(Australia) Todd Waters	19–20
Team Honda RedMoto Assomotor	Honda	152	(Bulgaria) Petar Petrov	1–10, 14–20
Scandinavian Racing Sports	Suzuki	30	(Sweden) Eddie Hjortmarker	10
Scandinavian Racing Sports	KTM	93	(Sweden) Jonathan Bengtsson	2, 6, 8–11, 14–17, 19–20
Ceres 71 Racing Team	Yamaha	32	(France) Milko Potisek	2, 19
Ceres 71 Racing Team	Yamaha	120	(Italy) Simone Zecchina	2–4, 9–11
Hitachi KTM UK	KTM	55	(United Kingdom) Graeme Irwin	1–6, 9–11, 14–16, 19–20
62 MotoSport Husqvarna	Husqvarna	62	(Slovenia) Klemen Gerčar	2–5, 7–8, 10–11, 14, 16–17, 20
Team Gebben V Venrooy Kawasaki Racing	Kawasaki	77	(Italy) Alessandro Lupino	All
Team Gebben V Venrooy Kawasaki Racing	Kawasaki	141	(France) Maxime Desprey	2–11, 19–20
KMP Honda Racing	Honda	83	(Belgium) Nathan Renkens	2–5, 7–11, 14–17, 19–20
KMP Honda Racing	Honda	926	(Belgium) Jeremy Délincé	8
Red Bull KTM Factory Racing	KTM	84	(Netherlands) Jeffrey Herlings	1–10, 12–20
Red Bull KTM Factory Racing	KTM	222	(Italy) Antonio Cairoli	All
Red Bull KTM Factory Racing	KTM	259	(Netherlands) Glenn Coldenhoff	All
KTM Sarholz Racing Team	KTM	85	(Germany) Stefan Ekerold	2–5, 8–11
KTM Sarholz Racing Team	KTM	212	(Belgium) Jeffrey Dewulf	15, 19
Monster Energy Yamaha Factory MXGP Team	Yamaha	89	(Belgium) Jeremy Van Horebeek	All
Monster Energy Yamaha Factory MXGP Team	Yamaha	461	(France) Romain Febvre	1–18
Bike It DRT Kawasaki	Kawasaki	100	(United Kingdom) Tommy Searle	1–2, 8–20
I-Fly JK Yamaha	Yamaha	128	(Italy) Ivo Monticelli	1–11, 14–20
I-Fly JK Yamaha	Yamaha	210	(Portugal) Paulo Alberto	9
JD 191 KTM Racing Team	KTM	191	(Czech Republic) Jaromír Romančík	9
JD 191 KTM Racing Team	KTM	831	(Poland) Tomasz Wysocki	2–5, 7, 9, 11, 14
STC Racing	KTM	347	(Austria) Johannes Klein	2
STC Racing	KTM	377	(Czech Republic) Martin Krč	8
STC Racing	Husqvarna	868	(South Africa) Michael Docherty	7, 9–10, 14–16
920 Fly Group Team	Husqvarna	920	(Spain) Ander Valentín	2–5, 7–11, 15–16, 20
Wild Card Teams & Riders
Team	Constructor	No	Rider	Rounds
ML MX Team	KTM	9	(Belgium) Ken De Dycker	2, 15
Team Beddini Racing	Yamaha	16	(Italy) Nicola Recchia	4
JWR Yamaha	Yamaha	20	(Sweden) Filip Bengtsson	2, 7, 15, 19
	Honda	23	(Netherlands) Menno Aussems	15
Honda Racing Brazil	Honda	28	(Peru) Jetro Salazar	1
Honda Racing Brazil	Honda	230	(Brazil) Hector Assunção	1
APJ Racing Team	Honda	31	(Croatia) Luka Crnković	2–4
Spormoto KTM Turkey	KTM	36	(Turkey) Sakir Senkalayci	18
Phoenix Tools Apico Honda	Honda	37	(Estonia) Gert Krestinov	2, 15
Honda MX Team Greece	Honda	38	(Greece) Panagiotis Kouzis	17–18
	Honda	40	(Uruguay) Hernán Cabrera	1
	Yamaha	48	(Turkey) Galip Alp Baysan	18
Maurer Racing Team	Husqvarna	49	(Slovenia) Jernej Irt	14
	Husqvarna	58	(Argentina) Nicolás Carranza	1
Team Alvaro Caparvi Racing	Kawasaki	73	(Italy) Pier Filippo Bertuzzo	20
KTM Team Fly Over	KTM	74	(Italy) Francesco Muratori	4, 20
	Husqvarna	78	(Switzerland) Yves Furlato	16
Scoccia Racing Team	Kawasaki	80	(San Marino) Thomas Marini	14, 16
KTM Switzerland	KTM	82	(Switzerland) Andy Baumgartner	16
Hutten Metaal Racing	Yamaha	94	(Netherlands) Sven van der Mierden	2–3, 14, 19
SKS Racing Husqvarna	Husqvarna	107	(Netherlands) Lars van Berkel	2, 15, 19
Haas Racing Team	Husqvarna	125	(Czech Republic) Petr Smitka	14
	Yamaha	134	(Argentina) Rodrigo Landa	1
Pol Motors Husqvarna	Husqvarna	151	(Estonia) Harri Kullas	2, 7, 15, 19
CSM Zambrana Husqvarna	Husqvarna	151	(Estonia) Harri Kullas	3
	Yamaha	160	(Greece) Manolis Kritikos	19
Djagung Racing Factory DRF	Husqvarna	162	(Indonesia) Farhan Hendro	12–13
Djagung Racing Factory DRF	Husqvarna	288	(Indonesia) Aldi Lazaroni	12–13
Djagung Racing Factory DRF	Husqvarna	336	(Australia) Lewis Stewart	12–13
Djagung Racing Factory DRF	Husqvarna	705	(Indonesia) Rizky Kusparwanto	12–13
DAM Racing	KTM	164	(Belgium) Dietger Damiaens	15
Team KTM Argentina	KTM	171	(Argentina) Juan Pablo Luzzardi	1
	Yamaha	175	(Argentina) Víctor Garrido	1
Avant Honda	Honda	179	(Argentina) Joaquín Poli	1, 4–5
	Honda	183	(Turkey) Batuhan Demiryol	18
SpeedCity Leiria/IMS Racing	Yamaha	210	(Portugal) Paulo Alberto	5
SN Motorsports	Kawasaki	220	(France) Grégory Aranda	10
Buksa/Ados KTM Team	KTM	232	(Czech Republic) Martin Michek	14
Team Pfeil Kawasaki	Kawasaki	291	(Latvia) Matiss Karro	7, 9
	KTM	300	(Russia) Viacheslav Golovkin	6
Dunois MX	Kawasaki	403	(France) Adrian Jorry	10
SJT Kahro Racing	Honda	411	(Estonia) Erki Kahro	6–7, 11, 19
Iannarone Team	KTM	471	(Ukraine) Volodymyr Tarasov	4, 7, 11, 14
Hostettler Yamaha	Yamaha	501	(Switzerland) Cyrill Scheiwiller	16
Carglass Honda	Honda	511	(United Kingdom) Steven Clarke	8
Italian Factory 8biano Motorsport	Husqvarna	550	(France) Simon Mallet	3, 5
Renter Team	Yamaha	613	(Czech Republic) Václav Kovář	8
DMX Motorsport	KTM	622	(Italy) Gianluca Di Marziantonio	4
Rama Jaya DS7	KTM	701	(Indonesia) Andre Sondakh	12–13
RGS Motocross Team	Kawasaki	707	(France) Robin Kappel	16
Tristan Moto	Husqvarna	710	(Switzerland) Nicolas Bender	16
GSM Daffy Michelin Yamaha	Yamaha	711	(France) Nicolas Dercourt	10
Flyover KTM	KTM	771	(Italy) Simone Croci	11
HFour Racing Team	Kawasaki	817	(France) Jason Clermont	16
MXN Motocross Parts/TEC Design	KTM	853	(Netherlands) Nino Dekker	19
Team Green Motec IDirt	Kawasaki	875	(Switzerland) Kim Schaffter	16
Ghidinelli Racing	Yamaha	878	(Italy) Stefano Pezzuto	3–4
	Suzuki	878	(Italy) Stefano Pezzuto	20
Team VHR	KTM	911	(France) Jordi Tixier	20
Wavelet MX Team	KTM	992	(Latvia) Toms Macuks	7
	Yamaha	999	(Portugal) Rui Gonçalves	5

=== Riders Championship ===
Pos	Rider	Bike	ARG (Argentina)		NED (Netherlands)		ESP (Spain)		TRE (Italy)		POR (Portugal)		RUS (Russia)		LAT (Latvia)		GER (Germany)		GBR (United Kingdom)		FRA (France)		ITA (Italy)		IDN (Indonesia)		IDN (Indonesia)		CZE (Czech Republic)		BEL (Belgium)		SUI (Switzerland)		BUL (Bulgaria)		TUR (Turkey)		NED (Netherlands)		ITA (Italy)		Points
1	(Netherlands) Herlings	KTM	2	1	1	1	2	2	1	1	1	1	3	1	1	1	1	1	1	1	1	1			2	1	1	1	1	1	1	1	1	1	1	1	1	1	1	1	1	1	933
2	(Italy) Cairoli	KTM	1	2	2	2	1	1	4	2	2	2	2	5	2	2	6	5	2	2	3	2	1	1	1	2	3	4	2	2	2	2	8	6	8	2	2	15	2	2	DNS	DNS	782
3	(Belgium) Desalle	Kawasaki	3	3	8	7	4	4	2	3	Ret	3	1	2	5	5	5	4	4	4	2	6	2	20	3	8	4	2	4	7	10	8	2	4	3	4	4	3	9	7	3	3	685
4	(Slovenia) Gajser	Honda			9	13	8	6	5	8	3	5	5	4	9	4	2	2	3	5	4	3	6	2	4	4	2	3	3	3	7	7	12	3	2	3	3	2	4	5	2	2	669
5	(France) Paulin	Husqvarna	6	6	7	3	7	3	6	5	4	Ret	4	6	4	3	3	3	18	15	8	5	4	3	6	7	5	11	6	6	13	13	7	15	5	9	8	4	7	8	4	6	574
6	(France) Febvre	Yamaha	4	5	6	5	3	5	3	7	5	4	7	3	3	Ret	4	7	5	3	7	4	5	6	5	3	20	12	7	4	3	5	3	2	4	5	DNS	DNS					544
7	(Netherlands) Coldenhoff	KTM	10	11	5	4	11	7	7	4	7	6	21	9	8	6	9	6	6	6	5	7	9	11	7	5	18	14	9	9	6	3	4	7	9	7	6	7	5	3	11	8	534
8	(Switzerland) Seewer	Yamaha	7	24	10	8	6	15	8	10	8	7	9	8	14	8	11	10	12	8	6	8	8	5	8	10	Ret	5	10	8	5	6	5	16	10	10	7	5	11	9	6	12	469
9	(Belgium) Van Horebeek	Yamaha	5	4	3	Ret	10	8	10	6	6	8	6	18	6	7	7	Ret	7	Ret	16	14	13	8	10	15	6	13	5	5	8	9	16	13	6	13	5	6	Ret	DNS	8	5	433
10	(United Kingdom) Anstie	Husqvarna	12	15	4	9	DNS	DNS	DNS	DNS			15	17	7	9	15	12	13	12	17	16	3	4	11	6	9	6	12	11	4	4	6	5	Ret	6	11	16	3	4	9	13	386
11	(Belgium) Lieber	Kawasaki	8	12	17	Ret	5	9	9	15	10	18	8	7	11	10	8	19	8	Ret	DNS	DNS			12	16	Ret	10	Ret	19	Ret	12	Ret	14	7	Ret	13	13	10	10	5	4	291
12	(Russia) Bobryshev	Suzuki	14	9	23	Ret	12	19	15	9	9	9	13	14	15	Ret	10	9	10	9	9	9	12	10	9	9	13	19	Ret	12	17	10	11	11					15	Ret	10	10	289
13	(Italy) Lupino	Kawasaki	19	10	24	19	17	16	14	13	15	14	11	11	16	11	13	11	22	7	12	17	11	12	13	11	8	8	8	15	Ret	26	14	10	12	12	12	10	14	15	Ret	DNS	283
14	(Belgium) Strijbos	KTM	17	21	14	10	14	13	18	14	Ret	12	14	19	18	14	Ret	15	16	13	14	15	14	7	17	18	10	15	19	10	9	22	10	8	15	11	15	12	8	11	Ret	9	267
15	(United Kingdom) Simpson	Yamaha	11	7	32	6	Ret	14	11	32	11	11	DNS	DNS					21	11	11	13	Ret	19	18	19			13	14	11	11	9	9	11	22	9	8	6	6	7	7	263
16	(Germany) Nagl	TM	12	8	11	14	9	11	13	Ret	12	10	16	10	12	13	12	8	11	14	13	12	7	9	Ret	13	17	9							DNS	DNS					13	11	245
17	(United Kingdom) Searle	Kawasaki	9	13	Ret	DNS											17	18	9	10	19	11	DNS	13	16	12	7	7	15	Ret	19	Ret	13	19	13	8	10	9	12	Ret	12	16	197
18	(Estonia) Leok	Husqvarna	21	19	16	15	18	17	16	17	13	17	23	21	20	15	19	20	20	19	21	18	17	17					14	17	14	15	17	12	14	15			13	13	16	18	139
19	(Lithuania) Jasikonis	Honda	15	14	13	11	15	10	17	Ret	Ret	15	10	13	10	16	14	16	15	Ret	DNS	DNS			Ret	22																	111
20	(Spain) Butrón	KTM	22	17	26	Ret	13	Ret	24	20	17	Ret	18	16	13	12	20	13	23	20	22	20	16	15					18	18	16	16	DNS	DNS	18	17			21	12	15	14	109
21	(Switzerland) Guillod	KTM																	14	16	10	19	10	14	14	17	11	17	11	13	21	20	18	17	21	18	Ret	DNS			DNS	DNS	97
22	(France) Desprey	Kawasaki			12	12	21	12	12	11	14	16	22	20	17	21	16	14	17	17	15	22	21	Ret															Ret	DNS	19	22	91
23	(Italy) Monticelli	Yamaha	18	18	22	20	Ret	21	19	Ret	22	21	20	15	21	19	Ret	Ret	24	Ret	DNS	10	15	Ret					20	16	Ret	Ret	Ret	Ret	16	14	14	11	Ret	23	Ret	19	72
24	(Australia) Waters	Honda													DNS	DNS							20	Ret	15	14	12	16	16	22	26	21	15	18	19	16	16	14	24	25	17	17	69
25	(Bulgaria) Petrov	Honda	20	Ret	18	16	19	20	20	23	18	19	17	Ret	19	17	Ret	17	Ret	18	20	Ret							Ret	21	20	23	19	20	17	19	18	17	Ret	DNS	21	20	54
26	(United Kingdom) Irwin	KTM	16	20	19	21	16	24	21	19	Ret	23	19	Ret					19	21	23	21	18	16					21	20	15	14	Ret	DNS					20	17	20	Ret	47
27	(France) Paturel	KTM							22	12	16	13	12	12	25	Ret	DNS	DNS			Ret	Ret	Ret	DNS																			40
28	(France) Tixier	KTM																											17	Ret	12	19									14	15	28
29	(Estonia) Kullas	Husqvarna			15	17	20	18							22	20															22	18							23	Ret			18
30	(Belgium) Dewulf	KTM																													18	17							19	14			16
31	(Australia) Stewart	Husqvarna																							19	20	14	18															13
32	(Netherlands) Van der Mierden	Yamaha			20	29	23	22																					27	27									17	16			10
33	(Estonia) Kahro	KTM											24	22	27	24							19	18															25	18			8
34	(Spain) Valentín	Husqvarna			Ret	23	22	23	25	18	20	20			24	18	Ret	22	26	22	Ret	Ret	Ret	24							23	Ret	23	22							Ret	DNS	8
35	(Indonesia) Lazaroni	Husqvarna																							21	Ret	15	22															6
36	(Indonesia) Kusparwanto	Husqvarna																							22	23	16	20															6
37	(Belgium) De Dycker	KTM			Ret	22	Ret	25	Ret	16																					Ret	DNS											5
38	(Peru) Salazar	Honda	23	16																																							5
39	(Netherlands) Bogers	Honda																																					16	26	DNS	DNS	5
40	(Greece) Kouzis	Honda																																	24	23	17	20					5
41	(Turkey) Demiryol	Honda																																			20	18					4
42	(Sweden) F. Bengtsson	Yamaha			30	18									23	22															31	27							22	22			3
43	(Germany) Ekerold	KTM			29	27	28	27	30	26	25	27					18	23	28	23	24	23	Ret	DNS																			3
44	(Latvia) Karro	Kawasaki													26	23			32	Ret																							3
44	(Latvia) Karro	Husqvarna																											32	Ret	29	25							18	Ret			3
45	(Italy) Bonini	KTM					27	Ret	29	Ret							Ret	Ret															Ret	Ret							18	Ret	3
46	(France) Aranda	Kawasaki																			18	Ret																					3
47	(Indonesia) Sondakh	KTM																							20	21	19	21															3
48	(Belgium) Renkens	Honda			Ret	31	26	Ret	Ret	27	24	28			29	Ret	23	24	31	24	28	Ret	23	Ret					24	26	30	Ret	Ret	23	20	Ret			27	19	24	23	3
49	(Turkey) Baysan	Yamaha																																			21	19					2
50	(Turkey) Senkalayci	KTM																																			19	DSQ					2
51	(Portugal) Alberto	Yamaha									19	Ret							25	Ret																							2
52	(Slovenia) Gerčar	Husqvarna			31	28	29	29	27	22	21	25			Ret	26	21	Ret			25	Ret	24	21					29	24			20	21	22	20					22	21	2
53	(Netherlands) Van Berkel	Husqvarna			25	26																									25	24							26	20			1
	(Sweden) J. Bengtsson	KTM			Ret	DNS							25	Ret			24	26	30	25	26	25	22	Ret					DNS	DNS	24	28	21	Ret	23	21			28	24	23	24	0
	(France) Potisek	Yamaha			21	Ret																																	Ret	21			0
	(Poland) Wysocki	KTM			27	24	25	26	26	21	23	24			Ret	DNS			27	Ret			25	Ret					23	Ret													0
	(Czech Republic) Kovář	Yamaha															25	21																									0
	(Czech Republic) Michek	KTM																											22	23													0
	(Argentina) Poli	Honda	24	22					31	29	27	29																															0
	(Ukraine) Tarasov	KTM							32	25					28	25							27	22					26	25													0
	(Portugal) Gonçalves	Yamaha									26	22																															0
	(South Africa) Docherty	Husqvarna													Ret	DNS			DNS	DNS	DNS	DNS							30	28	Ret	DNS	22	DNS									0
	(United Kingdom) Clarke	Honda															22	DNS																									0
	(Italy) Pezzuto	Yamaha					24	28	23	24																																	0
	(Italy) Pezzuto	Suzuki																																							25	Ret	0
	(Indonesia) Hendro	Husqvarna																							23	24	Ret	DNS															0
	(Italy) Zecchina	Yamaha			28	25	Ret	Ret	28	28									29	26	Ret	Ret	26	23																			0
	(Argentina) Carranza	Husqvarna	27	23																																							0
	(Switzerland) Baumgartner	KTM																															24	27									0
	(Sweden) Hjortmarker	Suzuki																			29	24																					0
	(France) Clermont	Kawasaki																															Ret	24									0
	(Argentina) Garrido	Yamaha	26	25																																							0
	(Belgium) Delincé	Honda															26	25																									0
	(Switzerland) Furlato	Husqvarna																															25	26									0
	(Switzerland) Bender	Husqvarna																															26	25									0
	(Italy) Bertuzzo	Kawasaki																																							26	25	0
	(Italy) Croci	KTM																					28	25																			0
	(Argentina) Luzzardi	KTM	25	Ret																																							0
	(Slovenia) Irt	Husqvarna																											25	Ret													0
	(France) Mallet	Husqvarna					Ret	DNS			28	26																															0
	(Czech Republic) Krč	KTM															27	27																									0
	(Netherlands) Dekker	KTM																																					29	27			0
	(San Marino) Marini	Kawasaki																											31	Ret			27	Ret									0
	(Estonia) Krestinov	Honda			DNS	DNS																									27	Ret											0
	(France) Dercourt	Yamaha																			27	DNS																					0
	(Greece) Kritikos	Yamaha																																					30	28			0
	(Czech Republic) Smitka	Husqvarna																											28	Ret													0
	(Belgium) Damiaens	KTM																													28	Ret											0
	(Switzerland) Schaffter	Kawasaki																															28	Ret									0
	(France) Kappel	Kawasaki																															Ret	28									0
	(Netherlands) Aussems	Honda																													32	29											0
	(Italy) Brugnoni	KTM																															Ret	29									0
	(Croatia) Crnković	Honda			Ret	30	30	Ret	34	31																																	0
	(Italy) Recchia	Yamaha							33	30																																	0
	(Switzerland) Scheiwiller	Yamaha																															Ret	30									0
	(Italy) Di Marziantonio	KTM							Ret	33																																	0
	(Italy) Muratori	KTM							35	34																															Ret	Ret	0
	(Belgium) Martens	Husqvarna																													Ret	Ret											0
	(Brazil) Assunção	Honda	DNS	DNS																																							0
	(Uruguay) Cabrera	Honda	DNS	DNS																																							0
	(Argentina) Landa	Yamaha	DNS	DNS																																							0
	(Austria) Klein	Husqvarna			DNS	DNS																																					0
	(Russia) Golovkin	KTM											DNS	DNS																													0
	(Latvia) Macuks	KTM													DNS	DNS																											0
	(Czech Republic) Romančík	KTM																	DNS	DNS																							0
	(France) Jorry	Kawasaki																			DNS	DNS																					0
Pos	Rider	Bike	ARG (Argentina)		NED (Netherlands)		ESP (Spain)		TRE (Italy)		POR (Portugal)		RUS (Russia)		LAT (Latvia)		GER (Germany)		GBR (United Kingdom)		FRA (France)		ITA (Italy)		IDN (Indonesia)		IDN (Indonesia)		CZE (Czech Republic)		BEL (Belgium)		SUI (Switzerland)		BUL (Bulgaria)		TUR (Turkey)		NED (Netherlands)		ITA (Italy)		Points

Colour	Result
Gold	Winner
Silver	Second place
Bronze	Third place
Green	Points classification
Blue	Non-points classification
Blue	Non-classified finish (NC)
Purple	Retired, not classified (Ret)
Red	Did not qualify (DNQ)
Red	Did not pre-qualify (DNPQ)
Black	Disqualified (DSQ)
White	Did not start (DNS)
White	Withdrew (WD)
White	Race cancelled (C)
Blank	Did not practice (DNP)
Blank	Did not arrive (DNA)
Blank	Excluded (EX)

=== Manufacturers Championship ===
Pos	Bike	ARG (Argentina)		NED (Netherlands)		ESP (Spain)		TRE (Italy)		POR (Portugal)		RUS (Russia)		LAT (Latvia)		GER (Germany)		GBR (United Kingdom)		FRA (France)		ITA (Italy)		IDN (Indonesia)		IDN (Indonesia)		CZE (Czech Republic)		BEL (Belgium)		SUI (Switzerland)		BUL (Bulgaria)		TUR (Turkey)		NED (Netherlands)		ITA (Italy)		Points
1	KTM	1	1	1	1	1	1	1	1	1	1	2	1	1	1	1	1	1	1	1	1	1	1	1	1	1	1	1	1	1	1	1	1	1	1	1	1	1	1	1	1	997
2	Kawasaki	3	3	8	7	4	4	2	3	10	3	1	2	5	5	5	4	4	4	2	6	2	12	3	8	4	2	4	7	10	8	2	4	3	4	4	3	9	7	3	3	704
3	Yamaha	4	4	3	5	3	5	3	6	5	4	6	3	3	7	4	7	5	3	6	4	5	5	5	3	6	5	5	4	3	5	3	2	4	5	5	5	6	6	6	5	685
4	Honda	15	14	9	11	8	6	5	8	3	5	5	4	9	4	2	2	3	5	4	3	6	2	4	4	2	3	3	3	7	7	12	3	2	3	3	2	4	5	2	2	684
5	Husqvarna	6	6	4	3	7	3	6	5	4	17	4	6	4	3	3	3	13	12	8	5	3	3	6	6	5	6	6	6	4	4	6	5	5	6	8	4	3	4	4	6	643
6	Suzuki	14	9	23	Ret	12	19	15	9	9	9	13	14	15	Ret	10	9	10	9	9	9	12	10	9	9	13	19	Ret	12	17	10	11	11					15	Ret	10	10	289
7	TM	13	8	11	14	9	11	13	Ret	12	10	16	10	12	13	12	8	11	14	13	12	7	9	Ret	13	17	9													13	11	245
Pos	Bike	ARG (Argentina)		NED (Netherlands)		ESP (Spain)		TRE (Italy)		POR (Portugal)		RUS (Russia)		LAT (Latvia)		GER (Germany)		GBR (United Kingdom)		FRA (France)		ITA (Italy)		IDN (Indonesia)		IDN (Indonesia)		CZE (Czech Republic)		BEL (Belgium)		SUI (Switzerland)		BUL (Bulgaria)		TUR (Turkey)		NED (Netherlands)		ITA (Italy)		Points

Colour	Result
Gold	Winner
Silver	Second place
Bronze	Third place
Green	Points classification
Blue	Non-points classification
Blue	Non-classified finish (NC)
Purple	Retired, not classified (Ret)
Red	Did not qualify (DNQ)
Red	Did not pre-qualify (DNPQ)
Black	Disqualified (DSQ)
White	Did not start (DNS)
White	Withdrew (WD)
White	Race cancelled (C)
Blank	Did not practice (DNP)
Blank	Did not arrive (DNA)
Blank	Excluded (EX)

== MX2 ==
=== Entry list ===
Officially Approved Teams & Riders
Team	Constructor	No	Rider	Rounds
Red Bull KTM Factory Racing	KTM	1	(Latvia) Pauls Jonass	1–19
Red Bull KTM Factory Racing	KTM	61	(Spain) Jorge Prado	All
Team HRC	Honda	10	(South Africa) Calvin Vlaanderen	All
F&H Racing Team	Kawasaki	14	(Australia) Jed Beaton	1–9
F&H Racing Team	Kawasaki	56	(United States) Marshal Weltin	15–17, 19–20
F&H Racing Team	Kawasaki	70	(Spain) Rubén Fernández	2–11
F&H Racing Team	Kawasaki	811	(United Kingdom) Adam Sterry	1–6, 9, 11–15, 19–20
Kemea Yamaha Yamalube Racing Team	Yamaha	18	(Russia) Vsevolod Brylyakov	1–6
Kemea Yamaha Yamalube Racing Team	Yamaha	127	(Venezuela) Anthony Rodríguez	8–20
Kemea Yamaha Yamalube Racing Team	Yamaha	193	(Belgium) Jago Geerts	1–16, 19–20
Kemea Yamaha Yamalube Racing Team	Yamaha	919	(United Kingdom) Ben Watson	All
Rockstar Energy Husqvarna Factory Racing	Husqvarna	19	(Denmark) Thomas Kjer Olsen	All
Rockstar Energy Husqvarna Factory Racing	Husqvarna	64	(United States) Thomas Covington	All
KTM Silver Action	KTM	26	(Italy) Nicola Bertuzzi	2–5, 7–10, 14–16
KTM Silver Action	KTM	118	(France) Stephen Rubini	1–7, 10–11, 14, 16–17, 20
KTM Silver Action	KTM	137	(Italy) Yuri Quarti	20
STC Racing	Husqvarna	29	(Germany) Henry Jacobi	All
Jumbo No Fear Vamo Honda	Honda	34	(Netherlands) Micha Boy de Waal	2, 4–5, 7–9, 11, 14–18
Jumbo No Fear Vamo Honda	Honda	56	(United States) Marshal Weltin	1–5, 7–11, 14
Jumbo No Fear Vamo Honda	Honda	312	(Spain) Oriol Casas	16–20
LRT KTM	KTM	43	(France) Natanael Bres	8
LRT KTM	KTM	46	(Netherlands) Davy Pootjes	1–15
Marchetti Racing Team KTM	KTM	44	(Italy) Morgan Lesiardo	1–8, 11, 14–17
Team VHR	KTM	52	(France) Adrien Malaval	16
Team VHR	KTM	106	(France) Scotty Verhaeghe	10
Team VHR	KTM	110	(France) Alexis Verhaeghe	2–5
Team VHR	KTM	338	(France) David Herbreteau	2–10
Team VHR	KTM	945	(France) Anthony Bourdon	19–20
Bike It DRT Kawasaki	Kawasaki	57	(United States) Darian Sanayei	1–4, 9
Bike It DRT Kawasaki	Kawasaki	891	(Brazil) Gustavo Pessoa	14, 16–18, 20
Husqvarna 8biano Motorsport	Husqvarna	66	(Spain) Iker Larrañaga	1–8
Husqvarna 8biano Motorsport	Husqvarna	172	(Belgium) Brent Van Doninck	1–8
DIGA-Procross Husqvarna	Husqvarna	66	(Spain) Iker Larrañaga	9–12
DIGA-Procross Husqvarna	Husqvarna	172	(Belgium) Brent Van Doninck	9–20
114 Motorsports Honda	Honda	88	(Netherlands) Freek van der Vlist	8
114 Motorsports Honda	Honda	96	(Australia) Hunter Lawrence	1–4, 7, 9–11, 14–20
114 Motorsports Honda	Honda	98	(Netherlands) Bas Vaessen	1–5, 10–20
Yamaha SM Action - M.C. Migliori	Yamaha	95	(Italy) Simone Furlotti	4–20
Yamaha SM Action - M.C. Migliori	Yamaha	161	(Sweden) Alvin Östlund	1–7, 19–20
Yamaha SM Action - M.C. Migliori	Yamaha	722	(Italy) Michael Mantovani	14
Yamaha SM Action - M.C. Migliori	Yamaha	747	(Italy) Michele Cervellin	9–16, 18–20
Yamaha SM Action - M.C. Migliori	Yamaha	959	(France) Maxime Renaux	2, 4, 14, 17–18
KTM Rocket Junior's	KTM	101	(France) Zachary Pichon	3–5, 7–11, 14–16, 20
JD 191 KTM Racing Team	KTM	102	(Slovakia) Richard Šikyňa	2–5, 7–11, 14–20
JD 191 KTM Racing Team	KTM	313	(Czech Republic) Petr Polák	14, 20
I-Fly JK Yamaha	Yamaha	129	(Norway) Sander Agard-Michelsen	2, 7
I-Fly JK Yamaha	Yamaha	297	(Sweden) Anton Gole	9–11, 14–16, 19–20
Team Ausio Yamaha Yamalube Maxxis	Yamaha	199	(Spain) Jorge Zaragoza	2–5, 8–9
Team Ausio Yamaha Yamalube Maxxis	Yamaha	267	(Italy) Edoardo Bersanelli	11
Team Ausio Yamaha Yamalube Maxxis	Yamaha	292	(Spain) Alex Gamboa	20
KTM Sarholz Racing Team	KTM	226	(Germany) Tom Koch	2–5, 7–9, 14–17, 19–20
TM Racing Factory Team	TM	321	(Italy) Samuele Bernardini	1–11
Hitachi KTM UK	KTM	426	(United Kingdom) Conrad Mewse	1–11, 15, 19–20
Team Martin Racing Honda	Honda	747	(Italy) Michele Cervellin	1, 4–8
E2T - Racing Team	Husqvarna	783	(France) Enzo Toriani	2–5, 7, 10–11, 14
E2T - Racing Team	Yamaha	832	(France) Bastien Inghilleri	10
Wild Card Teams & Riders
Team	Constructor	No	Rider	Rounds
	KTM	44	(Italy) Morgan Lesiardo	19–20
	KTM	50	(Russia) Sergey Kurashev	6
Team DIGA-Procross	Husqvarna	53	(New Zealand) Dylan Walsh	8
	Yamaha	59	(Turkey) Mustafa Cetin	18
2B1 Motorsports	Kawasaki	70	(Spain) Rubén Fernández	19
2B1 Motorsports	Yamaha	70	(Spain) Rubén Fernández	20
Sahkar Racing	KTM	75	(Estonia) Hardi Roosiorg	2–3, 7–8, 10–11, 15–17, 19
Z&B Racing Team	Yamaha	79	(Switzerland) Cyril Zurbrügg	16
Orion Racing Team	KTM	109	(Austria) Roland Edelbacher	14
	KTM	111	(Turkey) Emircan Senkalayci	18
MXR&D Husqvarna	Husqvarna	114	(Australia) Jy Roberts	13
	Husqvarna	122	(Uruguay) Germán Bratschi	1
	KTM	124	(Czech Republic) Jakub Terešák	14
Andre Motors KTM	KTM	130	(Netherlands) René de Jong	2, 14–15, 19–20
	Husqvarna	133	(Argentina) Luciano Righi	1
Motorsport Varna	KTM	136	(Bulgaria) Alex Dimitrov	17
Raceline Pirelli KTM	KTM	138	(Australia) Morgan Fogarty	13
Peter Mulder JR Husqvarna	Husqvarna	154	(Netherlands) Dani de Vries	15
Schepers Racing	KTM	173	(Denmark) Jakob Nielsen	19
	Honda	194	(Chile) Javier Vásquez	1
Djagung Racing Factory DRF	Husqvarna	204	(Indonesia) Hilman Maksum	12–13
Djagung Racing Factory DRF	Husqvarna	206	(Indonesia) Diva Ismayana	12–13
Djagung Racing Factory DRF	Husqvarna	281	(Indonesia) Yosua Pattipi	12–13
Djagung Racing Factory DRF	Husqvarna	325	(Indonesia) Muhammad Alfarizi	12–13
ASTES4-TESAR Yamaha	Yamaha	211	(Italy) Nicholas Lapucci	4, 20
ASTES4-TESAR Yamaha	Yamaha	321	(Italy) Samuele Bernardini	16–17, 19–20
BUD Racing Monster Energy Kawasaki	Kawasaki	225	(France) Brian Moreau	20
BUD Racing Monster Energy Kawasaki	Kawasaki	720	(France) Pierre Goupillon	20
Delta Yamaha	Yamaha	253	(Slovenia) Jan Pancar	18
Spormoto KTM Turkey	KTM	271	(Turkey) Furkan Valimaki	18
DMX Motorsport	KTM	275	(Italy) Joakin Furbetta	4
	Honda	276	(Chile) Sergio Villaronga	1
Team Griekspoor	KTM	299	(Netherlands) Lars Griekspoor	15, 19–20
	Husqvarna	301	(Turkey) Yasin Karaboce	18
Buildbase Honda	Honda	326	(United Kingdom) Josh Gilbert	9–10
	KTM	330	(United States) Austin Root	20
Team Husqvarna Switzerland/Wenger-Bike	Husqvarna	331	(Switzerland) Loris Freidig	3, 16, 20
M Smith KTM	KTM	351	(United States) Eric Grondahl	19
	Honda	375	(Argentina) Julian Seibel	1
Buksa/Ados KTM Team	KTM	377	(Czech Republic) Martin Krč	14, 16
Team Kawasaki Pfeil	Kawasaki	485	(Finland) Kim Savaste	2
Revolution Racing Team	KTM	485	(Finland) Kim Savaste	16, 20
JLD Motorcycles	KTM	520	(France) Jimmy Clochet	4–5, 20
	KTM	730	(Russia) Timur Petrashin	19
Thermotec Racing KTM	KTM	766	(Austria) Michael Sandner	17
BOS Project GP	KTM	773	(France) Thomas Do	3, 5
	Kawasaki	833	(Argentina) Lautaro Toro	1
Assomotor Honda	Honda	872	(France) Mathys Boisramé	4, 8
Honda Racing Brazil	Honda	891	(Brazil) Gustavo Pessoa	1
Honda Racing Brazil	Honda	934	(Brazil) Lucas Dunka	1
Solarys Racing SSRL	Husqvarna	931	(San Marino) Andrea Zanotti	8, 10, 16
CBO Moto Husqvarna	Husqvarna	945	(France) Anthony Bourdon	10
HFour Racing Team	Kawasaki	949	(Switzerland) Alessandro Contessi	16

=== Riders Championship ===
Pos	Rider	Bike	ARG (Argentina)		NED (Netherlands)		ESP (Spain)		TRE (Italy)		POR (Portugal)		RUS (Russia)		LAT (Latvia)		GER (Germany)		GBR (United Kingdom)		FRA (France)		ITA (Italy)		IDN (Indonesia)		IDN (Indonesia)		CZE (Czech Republic)		BEL (Belgium)		SUI (Switzerland)		BUL (Bulgaria)		TUR (Turkey)		NED (Netherlands)		ITA (Italy)		Points
1	(Spain) Prado	KTM	16	7	2	2	2	3	1	2	1	1	2	2	10	1	2	1	2	2	3	1	2	1	4	3	2	1	3	1	1	1	2	1	2	1	3	7	1	1	1	1	873
2	(Latvia) Jonass	KTM	1	1	1	1	1	1	4	9	2	7	1	1	2	5	1	2	1	1	4	6	3	3	2	7	1	6	4	5	4	6	1	2	1	3	6	1	8	6	DNS	DNS	777
3	(Denmark) Kjær Olsen	Husqvarna	3	2	3	3	3	4	3	16	4	2	4	5	1	2	15	5	Ret	Ret	2	4	5	2	5	9	11	4	7	4	3	4	10	5	3	5	5	2	2	4	2	4	673
4	(United Kingdom) Watson	Yamaha	4	4	10	7	14	8	11	7	5	3	3	6	5	4	4	4	6	4	9	7	4	5	6	2	3	5	6	Ret	11	5	6	7	6	4	4	4	4	5	8	17	602
5	(United States) Covington	Husqvarna	10	18	7	5	17	19	5	1	Ret	DNS	17	14	3	Ret	13	17	3	9	1	3	1	4	1	4	7	3	2	2	2	3	3	6	4	11	1	3	3	3	7	3	599
6	(Netherlands) Vlaanderen	Honda	18	5	15	11	7	7	Ret	5	18	6	6	4	9	7	3	3	4	3	12	5	9	6	3	1	5	2	1	3	5	7	Ret	4	Ret	DNS	13	8	5	2	12	8	543
7	(Italy) Cervellin	Honda	8	Ret					6	11	11	16	7	3	11	8	6	7																									397
7	(Italy) Cervellin	Yamaha																	10	10	8	8	13	10	8	10	6	11	11	7	9	Ret	9	10			9	10	7	7	4	7	397
8	(Belgium) Geerts	Yamaha	12	10	4	13	24	17	7	13	19	14	12	9	4	3	12	10	16	7	5	2	6	7	7	6	10	DNS	9	9	7	2	DNS	DNS					13	9	6	11	391
9	(Australia) Lawrence	Honda	2	6	6	6	5	5	DNS	DNS					Ret	DNS			Ret	14	6	13	11	12					5	6	16	12	5	3	5	2	2	5	6	10	Ret	2	353
10	(Germany) Jacobi	Husqvarna	5	16	13	Ret	12	Ret	2	10	9	8	Ret	13	6	12	5	8	7	5	24	Ret	10	19	11	8	DNS	DNS	8	8	13	17	12	13	Ret	Ret	8	11	11	Ret	3	9	343
11	(Belgium) Van Doninck	Husqvarna	20	Ret	11	Ret	21	18	18	20	13	17	13	10	Ret	DNS	14	12	15	18	18	Ret	Ret	DNS	13	14	9	9	16	12	10	11	16	11	8	Ret	14	13	12	14	15	13	224
12	(United Kingdom) Mewse	KTM	6	19	5	4	4	9	20	4	Ret	21	15	19	8	16	23	22	14	22	7	9	8	Ret							6	8							9	16	24	18	220
13	(United Kingdom) Sterry	Kawasaki	13	21	16	8	10	14	10	Ret	6	9	18	12					12	DNS			Ret	Ret	9	11	8	10	12	15	8	9							10	8	21	14	220
14	(Netherlands) Pootjes	KTM	19	14	9	9	15	13	8	6	Ret	15	11	15	15	6	11	9	18	8	10	Ret	7	11	10	5	DNS	DNS	DNS	DNS	DNS	DNS											218
15	(Venezuela) Rodriguez	Yamaha															16	13	9	11	DNS	DNS	12	9	14	13	4	7	DNS	DNS	17	Ret	4	8	14	6	7	6	Ret	DNS	9	5	217
16	(Australia) Beaton	Kawasaki	7	8	8	17	8	6	15	8	3	4	8	7	14	10	7	6	8	Ret																							216
17	(Netherlands) Vaessen	Honda	14	13	Ret	DNS	11	11	13	Ret	10	19									17	DNS	15	Ret	12	DNS	16	8	13	23	12	13	21	12	9	12	12	9	14	12	16	12	199
18	(Spain) Larrañaga	Husqvarna	11	12	18	14	22	15	14	12	16	11	10	11	12	9	10	18	11	6	13	12	14	8	20	DNS																	185
19	(Italy) Bernardini	TM	15	17	21	20	9	16	12	17	17	12	14	16	7	14	8	Ret	Ret	17	11	Ret	Ret	16																			169
19	(Italy) Bernardini	Yamaha																															11	15	10	15			Ret	19	Ret	6	169
20	(Italy) Furlotti	Yamaha							23	18	15	24	16	Ret	16	Ret	17	11	Ret	12	15	11	17	15	15	12	17	DNS	Ret	14	21	21	14	Ret	16	16	10	12	21	18	10	19	147
21	(United States) Weltin	Honda	21	Ret	22	18	23	22	28	23	Ret	DNS			24	Ret	Ret	14	5	13	20	20	Ret	Ret					Ret	DNS													137
21	(United States) Weltin	Kawasaki																													14	10	8	9	7	7			15	13	5	27	137
22	(Russia) Brylyakov	Yamaha	9	9	12	12	20	10	9	3	8	5	9	Ret																													127
23	(France) Rubini	KTM	17	15	Ret	19	16	20	19	19	21	10	5	8	Ret	DNS					16	10	16	DNS					21	DNS			7	Ret	Ret	DNS					11	Ret	107
24	(Spain) Fernández	Kawasaki			17	15	19	12	26	Ret	12	13	DNS	DNS	17	13	DNS	DNS	13	16	14	14	Ret	DNS															17	17			85
24	(Spain) Fernández	Yamaha																																							27	22	85
25	(United States) Sanayei	Kawasaki	Ret	3	Ret	10	6	2	DNS	DNS									Ret	Ret																							68
26	(Slovakia) Šikyňa	KTM			24	26	29	27	31	Ret	26	26			22	20	20	26	19	20	DNS	DNS	Ret	Ret					14	11	22	Ret	17	16	11	20	16	15	24	26	18	10	67
27	(Netherlands) De Waal	Honda			DNS	DNS			Ret	28	Ret	18			13	11	19	Ret	Ret	21			23	DNS					17	16	15	14	Ret	20	12	14	Ret	16					67
28	(Estonia) Roosiorg	KTM			23	22	26	25							19	17	Ret	21			19	19	19	13							19	15	18	18	15	13			16	15			59
29	(Sweden) Östlund	Yamaha	23	11	19	Ret	18	21	24	15	7	Ret	20	17	Ret	DNS																							18	11	20	Ret	54
30	(Germany) Koch	KTM			25	25	28	28	27	30	22	22			20	18	18	16	23	24									27	17	18	18	19	Ret	13	8			20	22	22	20	47
31	(Italy) Lesiardo	KTM	Ret	20	Ret	Ret	27	26	21	22	20	20	19	20	18	19	25	23					18	14					23	21	Ret	16	Ret	19	19	17			26	21	14	16	46
32	(France) Renaux	Yamaha			14	16			22	25																			10	10					Ret	DNS	11	DSQ					44
33	(Indonesia) Alfarizi	Husqvarna																							16	15	13	12															28
34	(France) Pichon	KTM					Ret	23	16	27	23	Ret			23	22	24	25	20	23	22	15	20	17					18	18	20	20	23	DNS							30	23	25
35	(Brazil) Pessoa	Honda	22	23																																							24
35	(Brazil) Pessoa	Kawasaki																											25	Ret			22	14	Ret	10	15	Ret			Ret	DNS	24
36	(Indonesia) Ismayana	Husqvarna																							17	16	14	13															24
37	(France) Herbreteau	KTM			29	21	25	Ret	Ret	21	14	Ret	Ret	18	21	15	22	Ret	21	15	DNS	DNS																					22
38	(Sweden) Gole	Yamaha																	22	25	Ret	17	21	Ret					Ret	20	Ret	19	13	17					Ret	20	DNS	DNS	20
39	(Indonesia) Maksum	Husqvarna																							18	17	15	14															20
40	(France) Boisramé	Honda							Ret	14							9	Ret																									19
41	(Austria) Sandner	KTM																																	18	9							15
42	(Australia) Roberts	Husqvarna																									12	15															15
43	(France) Moreau	Kawasaki																																							13	15	14
44	(Austria) Edelbacher	KTM																											15	13													14
45	(Spain) Casas	Honda																															Ret	Ret	17	18	18	17	Ret	Ret	29	Ret	14
46	(Slovenia) Pancar	Yamaha																																			17	14					11
47	(United Kingdom) Gilbert	Honda																	17	19	Ret	16																					11
48	(Spain) Zaragoza	Yamaha			28	Ret	13	24	25	29	DNS	DNS					Ret	24	DNS	DNS																							8
49	(Indonesia) Pattipi	Husqvarna																							19	18	18	DNS															8
50	(France) Malaval	KTM																															15	22									6
51	(New Zealand) Walsh	Husqvarna															Ret	15																									6
52	(Italy) Bertuzzi	KTM			26	27	30	Ret	17	24	Ret	DNS			26	Ret	26	27	24	26	DNS	DNS							19	Ret	DNS	DNS	DNS	DNS									6
53	(Turkey) Cetin	Yamaha																																			19	18					5
54	(France) Goupillon	Kawasaki																																							17	21	4
55	(France) Toriani	Husqvarna			30	29	Ret	31	32	32	24	25			DNS	DNS					23	21	22	18					26	Ret													3
56	(France) Bourdon	Husqvarna																			21	18																					3
56	(France) Bourdon	KTM																																					25	25	32	28	3
57	(Czech Republic) Krč	KTM																											20	19			25	23									3
58	(Turkey) Karaboce	Husqvarna																																			20	19					3
59	(Bulgaria) Dimitrov	KTM																																	20	19							3
60	(San Marino) Zanotti	Husqvarna															Ret	19			Ret	Ret											Ret	21									2
61	(Netherlands) De Jong	KTM			DNS	DNS																							29	25	DNS	DNS							19	23	34	30	2
62	(Italy) Lapucci	Yamaha							29	26																															19	24	2
63	(Norway) Agard-Michelsen	Yamaha			20	24									25	21																											1
64	(France) Bres	KTM															21	20																									1
65	(Turkey) Valimaki	KTM																																			Ret	20					1
66	(Finland) Savaste	Kawasaki			Ret	23																																					1
66	(Finland) Savaste	KTM																															20	Ret							25	Ret	1
67	(Italy) Bersanelli	Yamaha																					24	20																			1
	(Netherlands) Griekspoor	KTM																													24	22							23	24	DNS	DNS	0
	(Czech Republic) Polák	KTM																											24	22											23	26	0
	(Czech Republic) Terešák	KTM																											22	24													0
	(France) Inghilleri	Yamaha																			25	22																					0
	(Chile) Vásquez	Honda	26	22																																							0
	(Russia) Petrashin	KTM																																					22	27			0
	(France) Do	KTM					31	29			27	23																															0
	(Netherlands) de Vries	Husqvarna																													23	Ret											0
	(Switzerland) Contessi	Kawasaki																															24	24									0
	(Argentina) Seibel	Honda	25	24																																							0
	(Chile) Villaronga	Honda	24	26																																							0
	(France) Clochet	KTM							30	31	25	27																													28	25	0
	(Switzerland) Freidig	Husqvarna					32	30																									26	25							31	29	0
	(Uruguay) Bratschi	Husqvarna	27	25																																							0
	(Switzerland) Zurbrügg	Yamaha																															27	26									0
	(Italy) Quarti	KTM																																							26	Ret	0
	(France) A. Verhaeghe	KTM			27	28	DNS	DNS	Ret	DNS	DNS	DNS																															0
	(United States) Grondahl	KTM																																					27	Ret			0
	(Argentina) Righi	Husqvarna	28	Ret																																							0
	(Italy) Mantovani	Yamaha																											28	Ret													0
	(Argentina) Toro	Kawasaki	29	Ret																																							0
	(Spain) Gamboa	Yamaha																																							33	31	0
	(Italy) Furbetta	KTM							Ret	33																																	0
	(Russia) Kurashev	KTM											Ret	Ret																													0
	(Turkey) Senkalayci	KTM																																			Ret	Ret					0
	(Denmark) Nielsen	KTM																																					Ret	Ret			0
	(United States) Root	KTM																																							Ret	Ret	0
	(Brazil) Dunka	Honda	DNS	DNS																																							0
	(Netherlands) van der Vlist	Honda															DNS	DNS																									0
	(France) S. Verhaeghe	KTM																			DNS	DNS																					0
	(Australia) Fogarty	KTM																									DNS	DNS															0
Pos	Rider	Bike	ARG (Argentina)		NED (Netherlands)		ESP (Spain)		TRE (Italy)		POR (Portugal)		RUS (Russia)		LAT (Latvia)		GER (Germany)		GBR (United Kingdom)		FRA (France)		ITA (Italy)		IDN (Indonesia)		IDN (Indonesia)		CZE (Czech Republic)		BEL (Belgium)		SUI (Switzerland)		BUL (Bulgaria)		TUR (Turkey)		NED (Netherlands)		ITA (Italy)		Points

Colour	Result
Gold	Winner
Silver	Second place
Bronze	Third place
Green	Points classification
Blue	Non-points classification
Blue	Non-classified finish (NC)
Purple	Retired, not classified (Ret)
Red	Did not qualify (DNQ)
Red	Did not pre-qualify (DNPQ)
Black	Disqualified (DSQ)
White	Did not start (DNS)
White	Withdrew (WD)
White	Race cancelled (C)
Blank	Did not practice (DNP)
Blank	Did not arrive (DNA)
Blank	Excluded (EX)

=== Manufacturers Championship ===
Pos	Bike	ARG (Argentina)		NED (Netherlands)		ESP (Spain)		TRE (Italy)		POR (Portugal)		RUS (Russia)		LAT (Latvia)		GER (Germany)		GBR (United Kingdom)		FRA (France)		ITA (Italy)		IDN (Indonesia)		IDN (Indonesia)		CZE (Czech Republic)		BEL (Belgium)		SUI (Switzerland)		BUL (Bulgaria)		TUR (Turkey)		NED (Netherlands)		ITA (Italy)		Points
1	KTM	1	1	1	1	1	1	1	2	1	1	1	1	2	1	1	1	1	1	3	1	2	1	2	3	1	1	3	1	1	1	1	1	1	1	3	1	1	1	1	1	968
2	Husqvarna	3	2	3	3	3	4	2	1	4	2	4	5	1	2	5	5	3	5	1	3	1	2	1	4	7	3	2	2	2	3	3	5	3	5	1	2	2	3	2	3	814
3	Honda	2	5	6	6	5	5	6	5	10	6	6	3	9	7	3	3	4	3	6	5	9	6	3	1	5	2	1	3	5	7	5	3	5	2	2	5	5	2	12	2	693
4	Yamaha	4	4	4	7	13	8	7	3	5	3	3	6	4	3	4	4	6	4	5	2	4	5	6	2	3	5	6	7	7	2	4	7	6	4	4	4	4	5	4	5	680
5	Kawasaki	7	3	8	8	6	2	10	8	3	4	8	7	14	10	7	6	8	16	14	14	Ret	Ret	9	11	8	10	12	15	8	9	8	9	7	7	15	Ret	10	8	5	14	457
6	TM	15	17	21	20	9	16	12	17	17	12	14	16	7	14	8	Ret	Ret	17	11	Ret	Ret	16																			119
Pos	Bike	ARG (Argentina)		NED (Netherlands)		ESP (Spain)		TRE (Italy)		POR (Portugal)		RUS (Russia)		LAT (Latvia)		GER (Germany)		GBR (United Kingdom)		FRA (France)		ITA (Italy)		IDN (Indonesia)		IDN (Indonesia)		CZE (Czech Republic)		BEL (Belgium)		SUI (Switzerland)		BUL (Bulgaria)		TUR (Turkey)		NED (Netherlands)		ITA (Italy)		Points

Colour	Result
Gold	Winner
Silver	Second place
Bronze	Third place
Green	Points classification
Blue	Non-points classification
Blue	Non-classified finish (NC)
Purple	Retired, not classified (Ret)
Red	Did not qualify (DNQ)
Red	Did not pre-qualify (DNPQ)
Black	Disqualified (DSQ)
White	Did not start (DNS)
White	Withdrew (WD)
White	Race cancelled (C)
Blank	Did not practice (DNP)
Blank	Did not arrive (DNA)
Blank	Excluded (EX)
