= Rubén Fernández (motocross racer) =

Spanish motocross racer

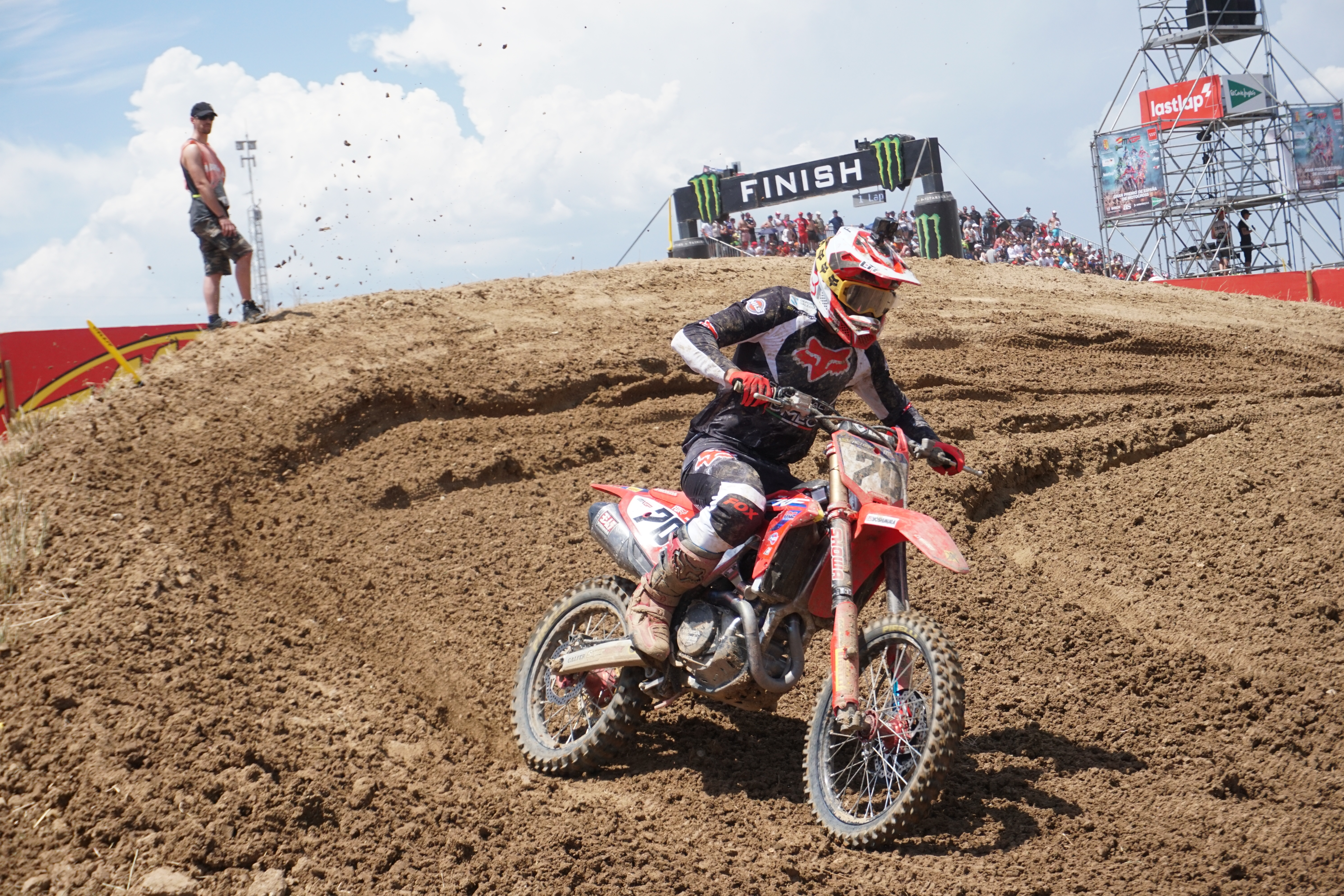
- Fernández in 2022
- Nationality: Spanish
- Born: 21 February 1999 (age 27); Vigo, Spain
- Current team: Team HRC
- Bike number: 70

Rubén Fernández García (born 21 February 1999) is a Spanish professional Motocross racer. He’s competed in the Motocross World Championships since 2017.

Fernández currently competes for Honda's factory team, known as Team HRC, in the MXGP class of the FIM Motocross World Championship. He won the 2023 MXGP of Argentina, the opening round of the 2023 FIM Motocross World Championship season.

Fernández has represented Spain four times at the Motocross des Nations.

Fernández is a two time Spanish Motocross Champion in the Elite-MX2 class.

Fernández is the son of 'Paco' Fernández, a former national level motocross racer, and the younger brother of Francisco and Sergio Fernández, who are also motocross racers.

== Career ==
After a successful junior career in Spain, where he became back-to-back 85cc national champion followed by becoming back-to-back 125cc national champion, Fernández made his debut in the EMX125 class of the European Motocross Championship in 2015.

=== MX2 ===
Fernández moved into the EMX250 class of the European Motocross Championship in 2016, finishing eleventh overall with a best race finish of fourth in the last race of the year. He achieved his best overall result in the EMX250 championship in 2017 by finishing third in the final standings, collecting several podiums along the way. In addition, he competed in three rounds of the 2017 FIM Motocross World Championship in the MX2 class, scoring points in all three rounds.

Staying with the F&H Kawasaki team, Fernández transitioned to the MX2 class for the 2018 FIM Motocross World Championship but endured a tough year, which saw him split with the team before the end of the season. In 2019, Fernández stepped back from world championship level racing and signed with the Italian SDM Corse Yamaha team to focus on the EMX250 class of the 2019 European Motocross Championship. A second place in the first race was the highlight of an injury hit campaign that saw him miss three rounds. For the COVID-19 hit 2020 season, Fernández stayed with SDM Corse Yamaha team but returned to the MX2 class of the 2020 FIM Motocross World Championship. An impressive season with a third-place finish in race one in Latvia saw him finish ninth in the final standings. This was coupled with winning his first national title in the Elite-MX2 class of the Spanish Motocross Championship.

For 2021, Fernández signed for the Honda 114 Motorsports team. He was able to make an immediate impact by achieving his first world championship podium, by finishing second overall at the opening round in Russia. He backed this up by finished third overall at the second round and would pick up a further three podiums on his way to ninth in the final world championship standings. However, for the final two rounds of the season, Fernández was signed by Team HRC to race in the MXGP class alongside title contender Tim Gajser. He was able to finish fourth in his first race in the class and was able to finish sixth and eighth overall respectively across the two rounds. Domestically, Fernández was successful in defending his Elite-MX2 title, winning every race he finished along the way.

=== MXGP ===
Following this, Fernández moved up to the MXGP class full time for 2022. He was able to pick up two overall podiums in his debut full season in the class, outperforming Team HRC rider Mitchell Evans and finishing eighth in the final standings. Fernández represented Spain at the 2022 Motocross des Nations, helping his country to its joint second best result ever.

Fernández was signed by Honda's factory team, Team HRC, for the 2023 season. At the opening round of the season, he was able to win both his first race win and first overall win at world championship level. A further three podiums were picked up during the rest of the season to contribute to him finishing fifth in the final standings. He had his second appearance at the Motocross des Nations for Spain following this, where the nation finished seventh overall. At crash on the first corner of qualifying race at the opening round of the 2024 FIM Motocross World Championship with several other riders saw Fernández sustain a torn ACL. The lengthy recover required meant that he was unable to return until the seventeenth round of the season. His best overall result over the last four rounds was a fourth overall in China. At the end of the year, he competed for his country at the 2024 Motocross des Nations, helping his country to finish fourth in the final standings. His personal results saw him finish third in the Open class.

Fernández put together a consistent MXGP campaign for the 2025 FIM Motocross World Championship, achieving three overall podium finishes, including back-to-back third overalls at the Portuguese and Spanish rounds. Due to these results he spent much of the season battling for third in the championship standings with veteran Glenn Coldenhoff, with the Dutchman ultimately grabbing the bronze medal by 58 points. Fernández was then selected to lead the Spanish team at the 2025 Motocross des Nations. He finished fourth in his qualifying race and sixth in the first main race, before crashing out of the final race of the event in spectacular fashion. In the 2026 FIM Motocross World Championship, Fernández was retained by the factory Honda team, alongside former MX2 world champion Tom Vialle and eventual season champion Jeffrey Herlings. With such a high benchmark set by his team mates, Fernández continued to be consistent, with multiple top-six race finishes in the first half of the year and landing on the podium at the German round. Winning the Saturday qualifying race at the British round would be his only victory in the MXGP paddock of the year. He would miss the final two rounds of the season after fracturing his thumb during qualifying at the Turkish round, bringing an early end to his year. As well as finishing seventh in the MXGP standings, Fernández competed in the first half of the 2026 Spanish Motocross Championship, winning the first four rounds at a canter.

== Honours ==
European Motocross Championship

- EMX250: 2017 (bronze)

Spanish Motocross Championship

- Elite-MX2: 2020 & 2021 (gold)
- 85cc: 2011 & 2012 (gold)

Spanish Motocross Cup

- MX125: 2013 & 2014 (gold)

== Career statistics ==
=== Motocross des Nations ===
Year	Location	Nation	Class	Teammates	Team Overall	Individual Overall
2022	(United States) Red Bud	ESP	Open	Jorge Prado; Guillem Farrés	6th	4th
2023	(France) Ernée	ESP	Open	Jorge Prado; Oriol Oliver	7th	7th
2024	(United Kingdom) Matterley Basin	ESP	Open	Jorge Prado; Oriol Oliver	4th	3rd
2025	(United States) Ironman	ESP	MXGP	Guillem Farrés; Francisco García	10th	11th

=== FIM Motocross World Championship ===
==== By season ====
Season	Class	Number	Motorcycle	Team	Race	Race Wins	Overall Wins	Race Top-3	Overall Podium	Pts	Plcd
2017	MX2	76	Kawasaki	F&H Racing Team	6	0	0	0	0	17	40th
2018	MX2	70	Kawasaki	F&H Racing Team	15	0	0	0	0	85	24th
2018	MX2	70	Kawasaki	2B1 Motorsports	2	0	0	0	0	85	24th
2018	MX2	70	Yamaha	2B1 Motorsports	2	0	0	0	0	85	24th
2020	MX2	70	Yamaha	SDM Corse Yamaha Racing	35	0	0	1	0	343	9th
2021	MX2	70	Honda	Honda 114 Motorsports	29	0	0	7	5	404	9th
2021	MXGP	70	Honda	Team HRC	4	0	0	0	0	56	26th
2022	MXGP	70	Honda	Honda 114 Motorsports	31	0	0	3	2	382	8th
2023	MXGP	70	Honda	Team HRC	37	1	1	8	4	654	5th
2024	MXGP	70	Honda	Team HRC	8	0	0	0	0	104	23rd
2025	MXGP	70	Honda	Team HRC	38	0	0	8	3	620	4th
2026	MXGP	70	Honda	Honda HRC Petronas	34	0	0	2	1	523	7th
Total					241	1	1	29	15	3188	

==== Grand Prix Wins ====
GP wins
Amount of GP-wins	Date	Grand Prix	Place
MXGP-class
1	12 March 2023	Argentina	Villa La Angostura
