= Guillem Farrés =

Spanish motocross racer

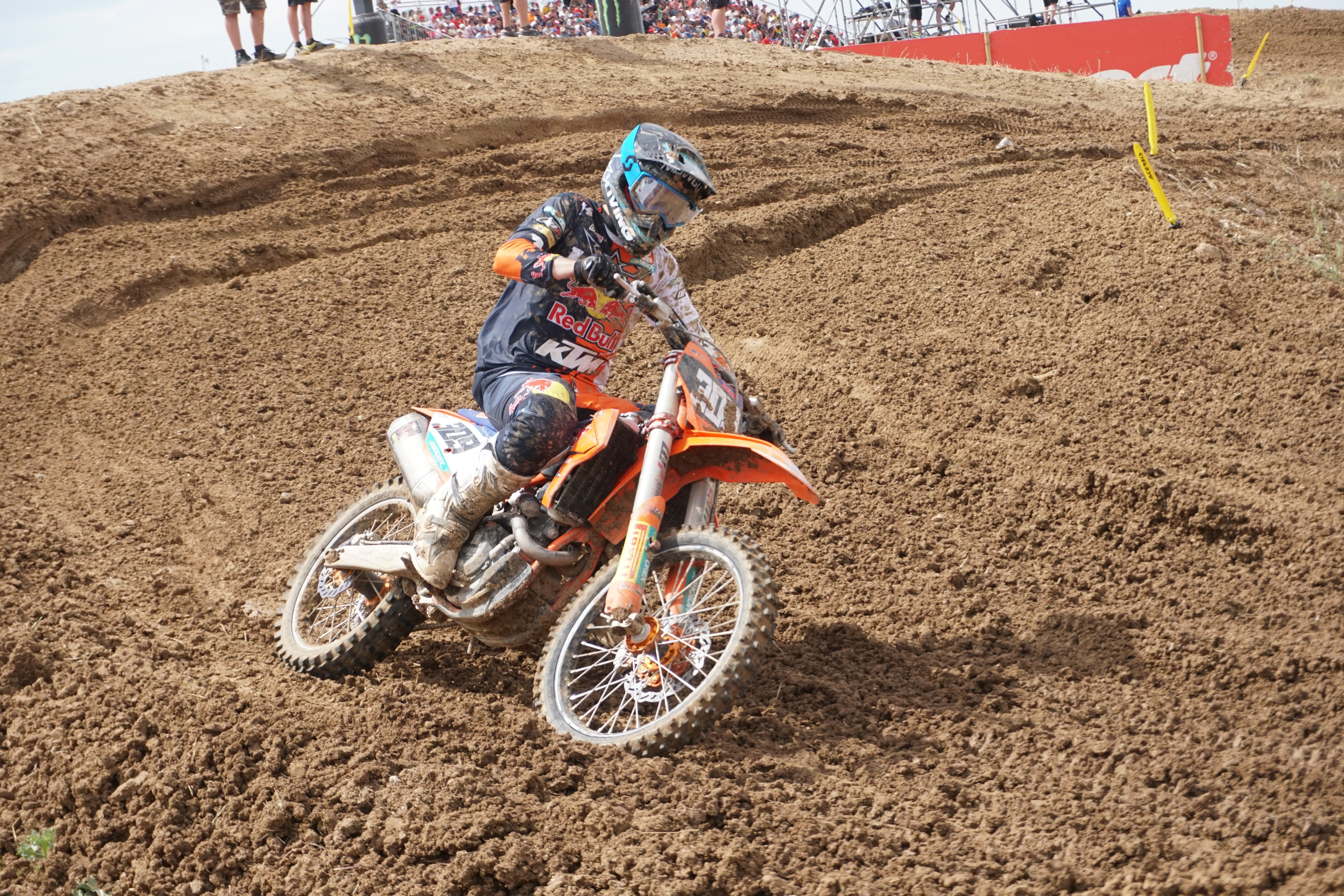
- Nationality: Spanish
- Born: 31 March 2003 (age 23) Barcelona, Spain

Motocross career
- Years active: 2021-Present
- Teams: •Monster Energy Star Racing Yamaha (2022-2023); •Rockstar Energy Husqvarna Factory Racing (2024); •Triumph Racing Factory MX2 (2024-Present)
- Championships: •2026 MX2
- Wins: •MX2: 6
- GP debut: 2021 GP of Spain, MX2
- First GP win: 2026 GP of France, MX2

Guillem Farrés Plaza (born 31 March 2003) is a Spanish professional motocross racer. Farrés has competed full-time in the Motocross World Championship since the 2025 season, after making wildcard appearances in 2021 and 2022. Farrés is the 2026 world champion in the MX2 class.

After impressing at European Championship-level in Europe, Farrés was offered the opportunity to compete as a factory rider in America from late 2022 to 2024. With injuries hampering his time in the States, he returned to Europe to compete for Triumph's factory MX2 team.

In the second year after his return, Farrés won the MX2 World Championship. In doing so, he made history for Triumph, winning the manufacturer's first world title since their return to making motocross bikes.

Farrés has represented Spain at the Motocross des Nations on three occasions, most recently at the 2026 edition. Farrés was part of the Spanish team that recorded the country's first podium finish at the event, in 2026. At the same event he won the MX2 class individually.

During the 2022 season, Farrés won the Youngster Cup class within the ADAC MX Masters.

== Career ==
=== Junior career ===
Coming from a family with an offroad motorcycling background, Farrés began competing at a young age and in 2013 finished ninth in the MX65 class of the Spanish Motocross Championship. Staying Kawasaki mounted, he moved up to compete on an 85cc motorcycle in 2014. His results improved significantly in 2015, where he finished fifth in the MX85 class in Spain, taking a race win and several podiums in the class. Farrés finished fifth again in the same class in 2016, a season which also saw him make his debut in the European Motocross Championship, scoring five points in the EMX85 class.

EMX125

Farrés started the 2017 season on an 85 but moved up to compete on a 125cc motorcycle mid-season, switching to a privateer setup on a Husqvarna and only competing in Spain. His first full season on a 125 saw significant steps forward, finishing runner-up with two race wins in the Spanish Championship and competing in two rounds of the EMX125 class of the 2018 European Motocross Championship, leading the first three laps of the second race in France. These performances saw Farrés signed by the F4E Racing KTM team to compete in a full EMX125 season in the 2019 European Motocross Championship. With two third place race finishes as his best results, he would end the championship in ninth. Domestically, he finished sixth in the Spanish Championship with one race win and overall win to his name. Farrés was also selected to compete at the 2019 FIM Motocross Junior World Championship in the 125 class, failing to score points.

Farrés stayed in the same team for the 2020 European Motocross Championship, which became the RFME Gas Gas MX Junior Team due to a joint venture between Gas Gas and the Spanish federation. Across the season he was able to score five podiums, which included his first overall win at European Championship-level in the deep sand of Lommel. A handful of non-finishes meant he finished sixth in the final standings. He put in a dominant campaign in the Spanish Championship, winning all but two races to pick up his first national title.

=== 250 Career ===
EMX250

Farrés stayed within the F4E team setup to move into the EMX250 class of the 2021 European Motocross Championship but had a difficult campaign, finishing fifteenth overall after missing two rounds, with seven top-ten race finishes being the highlights. His results were hampered by an accident with a car whilst cycling, which caused severed tendons in one finger that required extensive rehabilitation. After returning, Farrés made his World Championship debut, by competing in the MX2 class at the MXGP of Spain and scoring six points. His Spanish Championship campaign was impacted by the finger injury, after a strong start where he finished second overall at the opening round.

Farrés initially began the 2022 European Motocross Championship with the same team, but would ultimately only start at one round in the early part of the season due to forearm problems that required surgery. Farrés switched teams mid-season, to join the Raths Motorsports squad, which allowed him to compete in and win the Youngster Cup class within the ADAC MX Masters series. Upon joining the team, he raced in three rounds of the MX2 class in the 2022 FIM Motocross World Championship, showing competitive speed by picking up two tenth place race finished. In addition, he competed at the seventh round of the EMX250 class for the same German team, finishing second in the second race in the deep sand of Lommel. Farrés competed in all but two rounds of the 2022 Spanish Motocross Championship, winning three races and one overall victory to finish seventh in the standings.

Move to America

After picking up the Youngster Cup title, Farrés received a call to test for the Star Racing Yamaha team in America. As a result of this, he competed in two rounds of the 250 class of the 2022 AMA National Motocross Championship for the team, impressing many in America with his speed and recording a sixth place race finish along the way. At the end of the season, Farrés was selected to compete for Spain in the 2022 Motocross des Nations, held in the United States. After finishing fourth in his individual class qualifying race, the team ended the event in sixth overall.

Following these results, Farrés signed a motocross-only deal with the Star Yamaha team. In the first two rounds of the 2023 AMA National Motocross Championship, Farrés showed good speed, scoring two top-six race finishes. At the third round, a pileup at the first corner in the opening race resulted in a massive arm injury for the Spaniard, which ultimately ended his season. For the 2024 season, Farrés signed for Rockstar Energy Husqvarna Factory Racing to compete in supercross for the first time, as well as outdoors. With little experience in supercross, he finished in the top-ten in the first two rounds of the 250SX East class of the 2024 AMA Supercross Championship. Following the second round, he sustained a broken femur in a training crash, which ruled him out for the rest of the year.

Return to Europe

After two injury hit seasons in America, Farrés returned to Europe by signing for the Monster Energy Triumph Factory Racing team in the MX2 class of the 2025 FIM Motocross World Championship. At the third round, he crashed and sustained a concussion that ruled him out for the following three rounds. On his return, Farrés became more consistent inside the top-ten, before taking his first world championship race win and podium at the German round. In the second half of the season he picked up two third place race finishes and ended the championship in eighth overall. Farrés made his second appearance for Spain at the 2025 Motocross des Nations, recording two sixteenth-place finishes in the main Sunday races, as the team ended the event tenth.

Farrés signalled his potential for the season ahead at the first round of the 2026 FIM Motocross World Championship, by finishing second overall. This was backed up by two race wins at the following two rounds, the first in front of his home crowd in Spain. After being robbed of his first overall win at home due to a mechanical issue in the second race, Farrés would take his first grand prix win at the sixth round in France. A further race win at the Italian round pulled Farrés into second in the standings and from the following round in Portugal, he dominated four grand prix in a row, taking the overall win at all of them. By the end of this streak, Farrés was the championship leader by over thirty points and with former leader Sacha Coenen battling injury, he now had a manageable championship lead. A heavy crash at the Swedish round would see him lose some ground, however, three podiums at the final four rounds, including another overall win in Turkey, would be enough for Farrés to become world champion. Along with his first title, this was also Triumph's first title since the manufacturer returned to the sport, with his team mate Camden McLellan making it a one-two for the manufacturer in the final standings. Farrés season concluded at the 2026 Motocross des Nations, where his results were crucial to the Spanish team achieving its first ever overall podium at the event. Finishing fourth in his qualifying race was followed by finishing fourth and fifth in his two main races, allowing him to win the individual MX2 class overall alongside the Spanish team finishing second.

=== 450 Career ===
Due to the under-23 age cap for the MX2 class, Farrés will compete in the MXGP class from 2027 onwards.

== Honours ==
Motocross des Nations

- Team Overall: 2026 (Spain) (silver)
- Individual Overall: 2026 MX2 (gold)

FIM Motocross World Championship

- MX2: 2026 (gold)

ADAC MX Masters

- Youngster Cup: 2022 (gold)

Spanish Motocross Championship

- MX125: 2020 (gold) , 2018 (silver)

== Career statistics ==
=== Motocross des Nations ===
Year	Location	Nation	Class	Teammates	Team Overall	Individual Overall
2022	(United States) Red Bud	ESP	MX2	Jorge Prado; Rubén Fernández	6th	13th
2025	(United States) Ironman	ESP	MX2	Rubén Fernández; Francisco García	10th	8th
2026	(France) Ernée	ESP	MX2	Jorge Prado; Francisco García	2nd	1st

=== FIM Motocross World Championship ===
==== By season ====
Season	Class	Number	Motorcycle	Team	Race	Race Wins	Overall Wins	Race Top-3	Overall Podium	Pts	Plcd
2021	MX2	309	Gas Gas	F4E Gas Gas Racing Team	2	0	0	0	0	6	44th
2022	MX2	309	KTM	Raths Motorsports	6	0	0	0	0	38	26th
2025	MX2	99	Triumph	Monster Energy Triumph Racing	34	1	0	3	1	500	8th
2026	MX2	99	Triumph	Monster Energy Triumph Racing	38	14	6	24	13	904	1st
Total					80	15	6	27	14	1448	

==== Grand Prix wins ====
GP wins
GP-win count	Date	Grand Prix	Place
MX2-class
1	24 May 2026	France	Lacapelle-Marival
2	28 June 2026	Portugal	Águeda
3	5 July 2026	South Africa	Johannesburg
4	19 July 2026	Great Britain	Foxhill
5	26 July 2026	Czech Republic	Loket
6	6 September 2026	Turkey	Afyonkarahisar

=== AMA Supercross Championship ===
==== By season ====
Season	Class	Number	Motorcycle	Team	Overall Wins	Overall Podium	Pts	Plcd
2024	250SX East	83	Husqvarna	Rockstar Energy Husqvarna Factory Racing	0	0	27	18th
Total					0	0	27	

=== AMA National Motocross Championship ===
==== By season ====
Season	Class	Number	Motorcycle	Team	Races	Race Wins	Overall Wins	Race Top-3	Overall Podium	Pts	Plcd
2022	250	109	Yamaha	Monster Energy Star Racing Yamaha	4	0	0	0	0	40	25th
2023	250	88	Yamaha	Monster Energy Star Racing Yamaha	5	0	0	0	0	57	22nd
Total					9	0	0	0	0	97	

== MXGP Results ==
Year	Rnd 1	Rnd 2	Rnd 3	Rnd 4	Rnd 5	Rnd 6	Rnd 7	Rnd 8	Rnd 9	Rnd 10	Rnd 11	Rnd 12	Rnd 13	Rnd 14	Rnd 15	Rnd 16	Rnd 17	Rnd 18	Rnd 19	Rnd 20	Average Finish	Podium Percent	Place
2026 MX2	2 ARG (Argentina)	9 AND (Andalusia)	2 SUI (Switzerland)	9 SAR (Sardinia)	2 TRE	1 FRA (France)	6 GER (Germany)	4 LAT (Latvia)	2 ITA (Italy)	1 POR (Portugal)	1 RSA (South Africa)	1 GBR (United Kingdom)	1 CZE (Czech Republic)	2 FLA (Flanders)	4 SWE (Sweden)	3 NED (Netherlands)	1 TUR (Turkey)	2 CHN (China)	4 AUS (Australia)	-	3.00	68%	1st
