= Pablo Vivanco =

Argentine footballer

Personal information
- Full name: Pablo Nicolás Vivanco Gutiérrez
- Date of birth: 23 November 1989 (age 36)
- Place of birth: Neuquén, Argentina
- Height: 1.80 m (5 ft 11 in)
- Position: Midfielder

Youth career
- Elche

Senior career*
Years	Team	Apps	(Gls)
2008–2010	Elche B		
2010–2012	Murcia B	67	(2)
2012–2013	Murcia	1	(0)
2012–2013	→ Olímpic Xàtiva (loan)	4	(0)
2013–2014	Orihuela	43	(5)
2014–2016	Eldense	34	(2)
2016	Mérida	8	(0)
2016–2021	Yeclano	46	(1)
- * Club domestic league appearances and goals as of 19 July 2020

Pablo Nicolás Vivanco Gutiérrez (born 23 November 1989) is an Argentine former footballer who played as a midfielder.

== Football career ==
Born in Neuquén, Patagonia, Vivanco graduated from Spanish club Elche CF's youth setup, and made his senior debuts for the reserves in 2008 in the regional leagues. In the 2010 summer he moved to another reserve team, Real Murcia Imperial of the Tercera División.

On 23 May 2012, Vivanco made his debut with the first team of the latter, starting in a 0–1 home loss against SD Huesca in the Segunda División. In June, he was loaned to Segunda División B club CD Olímpic de Xàtiva.

After appearing rarely, Vivanco returned to Murcia and terminated his contract, signing with Orihuela CF on 31 January 2013. He appeared in eight matches for the latter during the 2012–13 season, which finished in relegation, and renewed his link on 12 July.

On 5 July 2014, Vivanco joined neighbouring CD Eldense, newly promoted to the third level.

After a serious knee injury, Vivanco retired as footballer on 12 March 2021.
