= Maxime Renaux =

French motorcycle racer (born 2000)

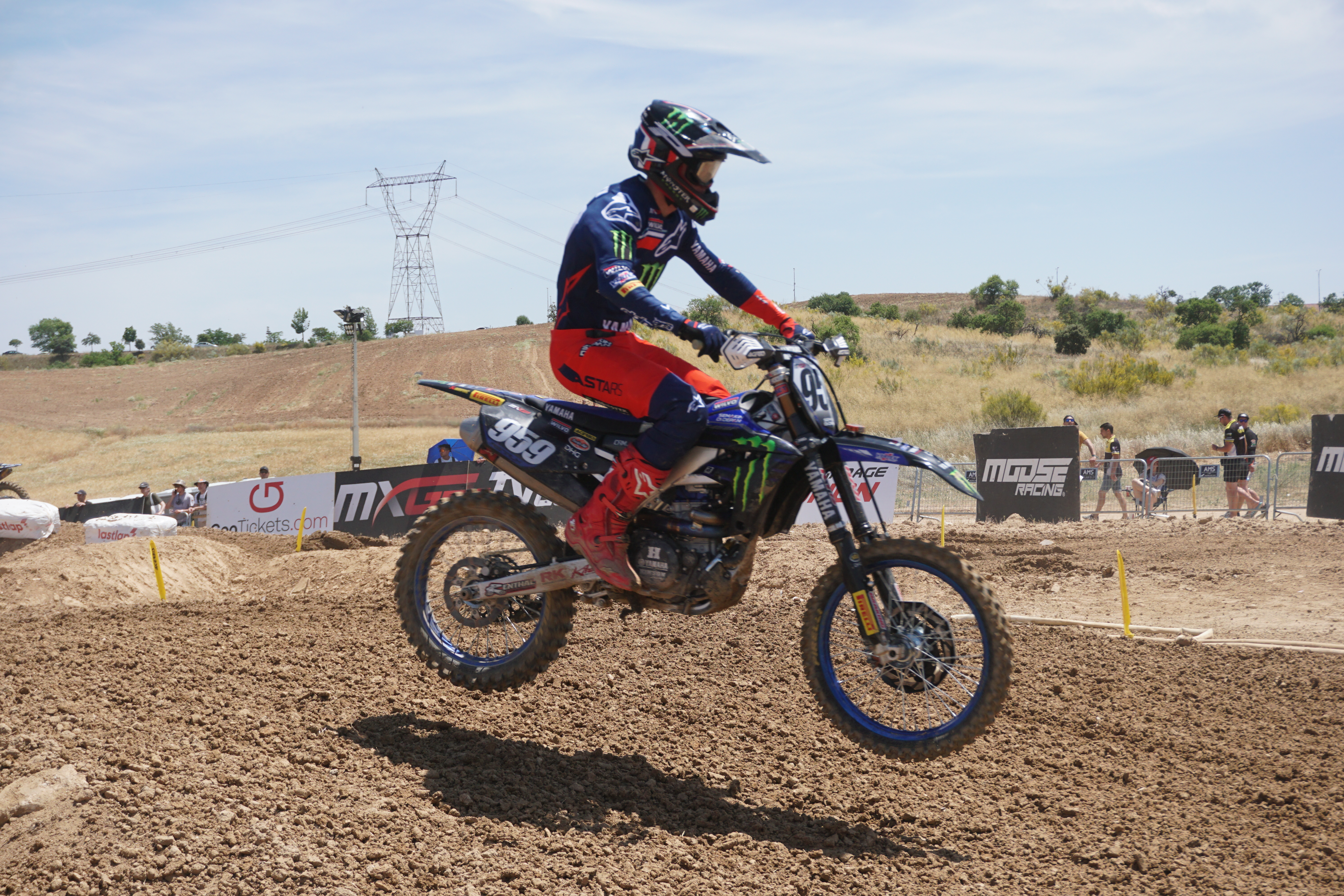
- Renuax in 2022
- Nationality: French
- Born: 17 May 2000 (age 26) Sedan, France

Motocross career
- Years active: 2016-present
- Teams: •Monster Energy Yamaha Factory MXGP Team (2016-2026); •Red Bull KTM De Carli Racing Team (2026-Present)
- Championships: •2015 FIM 125cc; •2021 MX2
- Wins: •MX2: 6; •MXGP: 3
- GP debut: 2016, GP of Netherlands, MX2
- First GP win: 2020, GP of Italy, MX2

Maxime Renaux (born 17 May 2000) is a French professional motocross racer. He has competed in the Motocross World Championships since 2016. He is the 2015 French 125 Junior Champion, and the 2021 MX2 World Champion. He was a member of the winning French team at the 2023 Motocross des Nations.

== Motocross Career ==
=== 2021 ===
In 2021, Renuax won the MX2 World Championship with five GP wins as well as 14 out of 18 podium finishes.

=== 2022 ===
For the 2022 season, Renaux made his debut in the MXGP class. He placed fourth in the final Championship standings with one Grand Prix win at Round 9, as well as seven podium finishes.

Renaux was also chosen to represent France at the MXON, alongside Dylan Ferrandis & Marvin Musquin, in the MXGP category. In the qualifying race, he finished seventh, in Race 1, he finished third, and in Race 3, he placed first, which was enough to give Francesecond place.

=== 2023 ===
After a strong debut season in 2022, Renaux was poised as a title challenger for 2023. Renaux won round 3, but a few weeks later at the Spanish Grand Prix, he suffered a fracture in his foot. This sidelined him for a majority of the season, therefore ending his championship goals.

=== 2024 ===
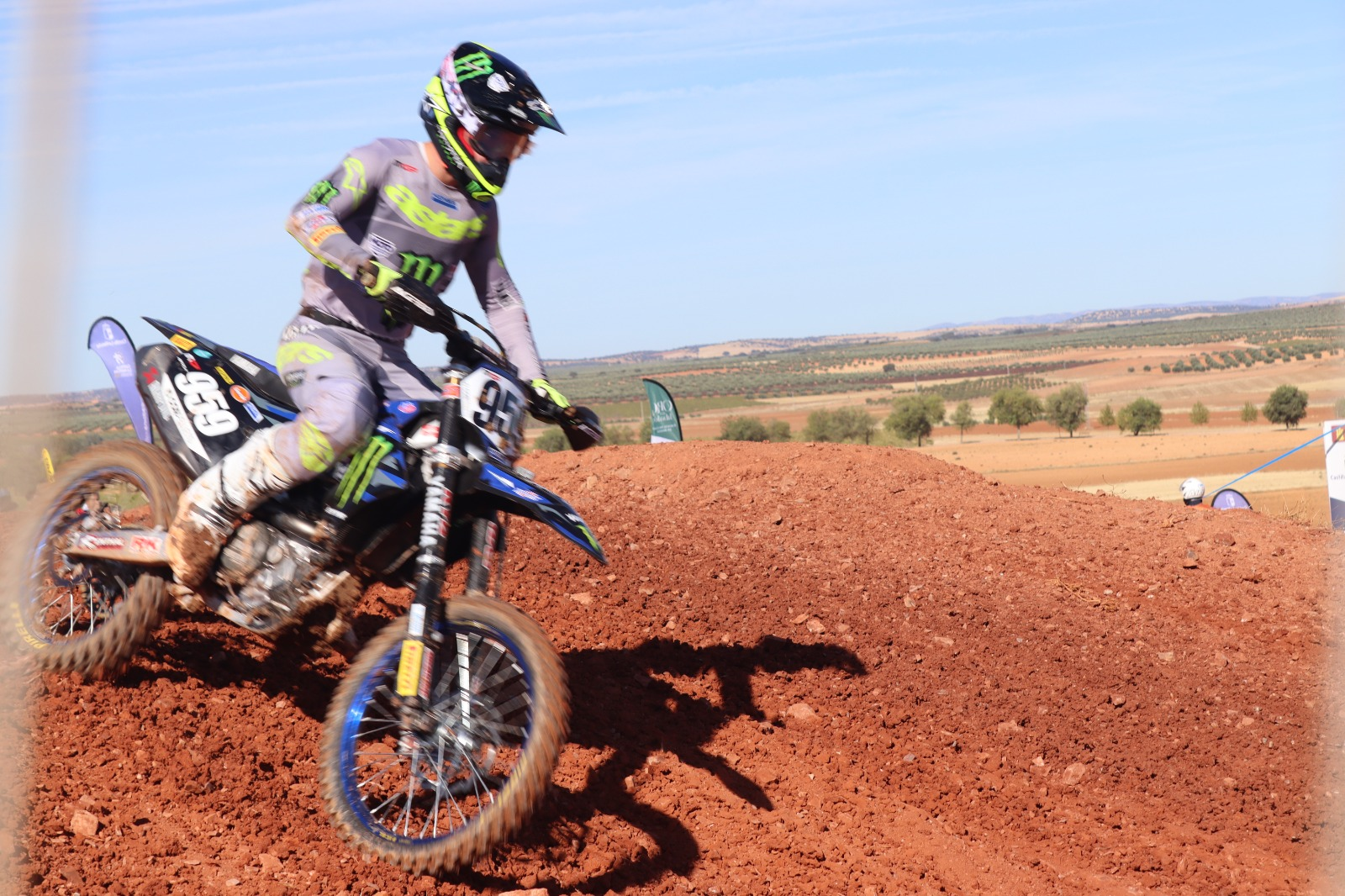
Renaux In 2024

Renaux competed in the opening two Grand Prix but re-aggravated his injured foot from 2023. He returned for the last four races and scored one top five.

=== 2025 ===
In the 2025 FIM Motocross World Championship, Maxime Renaux competed in the MXGP class for the Monster Energy Yamaha Factory MXGP team. He entered the season aiming to build consistency and challenge among top contenders such as Romain Febvre, Tim Gajser, and Jeffrey Herlings. Across the season, Renaux collected one overall Grand Prix victory and several strong moto finishes, eventually placing seventh in the championship standings with 527 points.

Renaux began his season in strong fashion, winning the MXGP of Argentina outright, marking his sole GP win of 2025. In subsequent rounds, he frequently posted top-5 moto finishes. For instance, he placed fourth in Germany and also achieved fourth in the Latvia GP.

However, his campaign also included setbacks. Renaux withdrew from the MXGP of Great Britain (Matterley Basin) due to circumstances announced by his team. In the Turkey round, he still managed an overall sixth place finish amid challenging conditions.

Throughout the season, Renaux showed resilience. Still, he was unable to replicate the frequency of wins or podiums achieved by the championship frontrunners.

== MXGP Results ==
Year	Rnd 1	Rnd 2	Rnd 3	Rnd 4	Rnd 5	Rnd 6	Rnd 7	Rnd 8	Rnd 9	Rnd 10	Rnd 11	Rnd 12	Rnd 13	Rnd 14	Rnd 15	Rnd 16	Rnd 17	Rnd 18	Rnd 19	Rnd 20	Average Finish	Podium Percent	Place
2020 MX2	11	2	7	5	5	1	2	9	4	4	14	5	4	5	3	5	4	3	-	-	5.17	28%	3rd
2021 MX2	6	1	2	4	2	3	1	2	2	2	1	3	1	8	5	1	2	2	-	-	2.66	78%	1st
2022 MXGP	4	2	2	11	2	5	3	4	1	8	OUT	OUT	2	6	8	3	5	4	-	-	4.37	44%	4th
2023 MXGP	6	4	1	2	10	OUT	OUT	OUT	OUT	OUT	OUT	OUT	OUT	OUT	6	6	3	16	DNS	-	6.00	33%	10th
2024 MXGP	5	11	OUT	OUT	OUT	OUT	OUT	OUT	OUT	OUT	OUT	OUT	OUT	OUT	OUT	OUT	6	5	12	9	8.00	-	17th
2025 MXGP	1	10	7	21	6	14	7	4	9	4	11	OUT	OUT	13	12	4	8	6	5	DNF	8.35	6%	7th
2026 MXGP	7 ARG (Argentina)	4 AND (Andalusia)	2 SUI (Switzerland)	9 SAR (Sardinia)	5 TRE	5 FRA (France)	4 GER (Germany)	17 LAT (Latvia)	3 ITA (Italy)	8 POR (Portugal)	7 RSA (South Africa)	9 GBR (United Kingdom)	13 CZE (Czech Republic)	13 FLA (Flanders)	9 SWE (Sweden)	DNF NED (Netherlands)	OUT TUR (Turkey)	OUT CHN (China)	OUT AUS (Australia)	-	7.18	13%	8th
