= Jorge Prado (motocross racer) =

Spanish racer (born 2001)

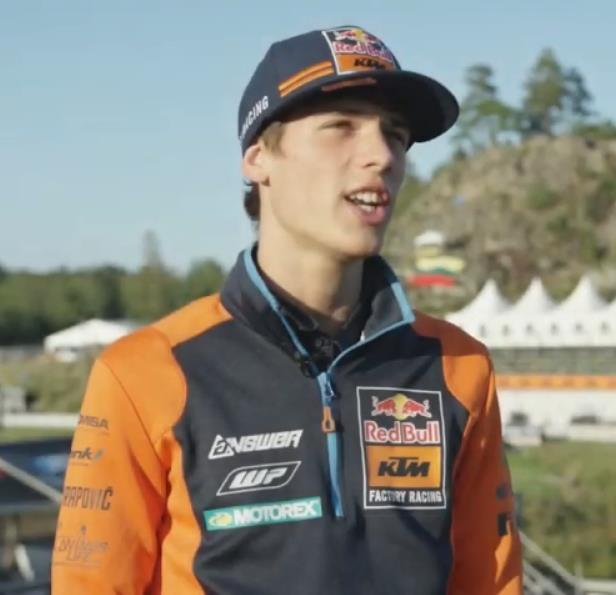
- Prado in 2020
- Nationality: Spanish (Spain)
- Born: 5 January 2001 (age 25) Lugo, Galicia, Spain

Motocross career
- Years active: 2016–present
- Teams: •Red Bull KTM/GasGas De Carli MXGP Racing Team (2011–2024); •Monster Energy Kawasaki (2024–2025); •Red Bull KTM Factory Racing Team (2025–present)
- Championships: •2011 FIM 65cc; •2011 EMX 65cc; •2015 EMX 125cc; •2018 MX2; •2019 MX2; •2023 MXGP; •2024 MXGP; •2026 SMX 450cc
- Wins: •MX2: 31; •MXGP: 18; •Combined MXGP: 49; •AMA 450cc Motocross: 1
- GP debut: 2016 GP of Netherlands, Assen, MX2
- First GP win: 2017 GP of Trentino, MX2

Jorge Prado García (born 5 January 2001) is a Spanish professional motocross racer who currently competes in the AMA Supercross & AMA Motocross Championships. He competed in the Motocross World Championships from 2016 to 2024. Prado is a two-time MXGP & MX2 Motocross World Champion.

Prado signed and raced for the KTM group from age 11 in 2011, to age 23 in 2024, a relationship lasting 13 years included four FIM Motocross World Championships. As of November 2025, Prado races for the Red Bull KTM Factory Racing Team in the USA.

== Motocross career ==
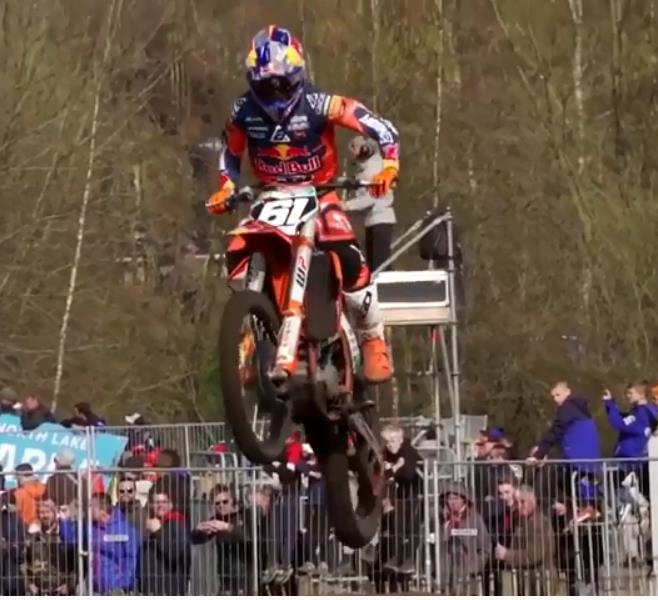
Prado (#61) in a jump.

At the age of three, Prado started riding a motorcycle, and at the age of six, he started competing in the first races. He won his first race at seven. His family moved to Lommel, Belgium in 2012.

=== 2011 ===
In 2011, Prado won the 65cc FIM Junior motocross world championship as well as the 65cc European motocross championship.

=== 2015 ===
In 2015, Prado won the 125cc European Motocross Championship.

=== 2016 ===
In 2016, Prado debuted in the MX2 World Championship with a third place finish at Assen, Netherlands.

=== 2017 ===
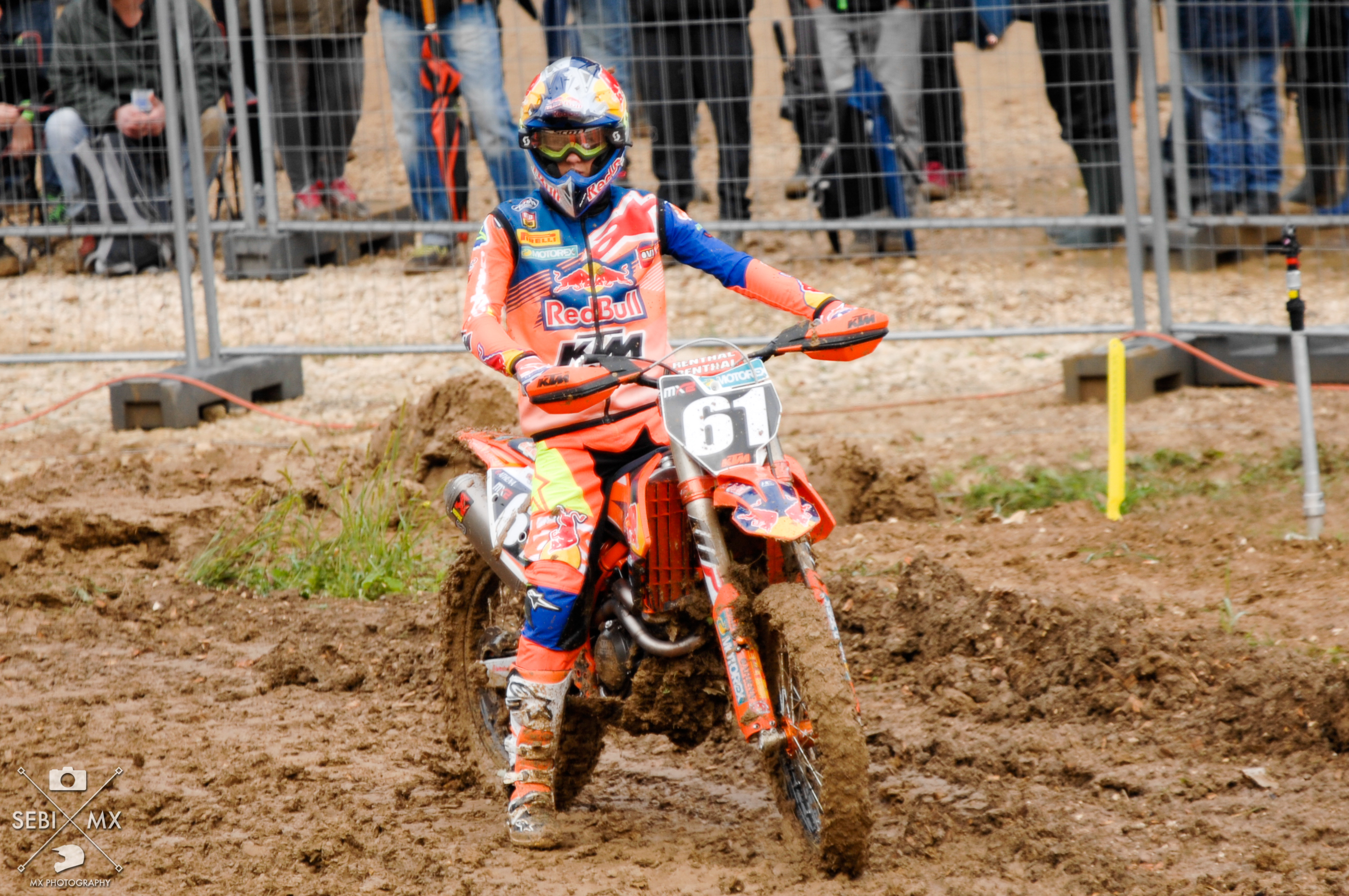
Prado in 2017

In 2017, Prado was the first Spanish rider to win a motocross Grand Prix in MX2. He also won three Grand Prix's and podiumed 5 out of 20 rounds, on his way to a seventh place finish, in the MX2 standings.

=== 2018/19 ===
2018

In 2018, Prado won the MX2 World Championship. He won 12GP’s and finished 17 times on the podium.

2019

In 2019, Prado successfully defended his MX2 championship by winning 16 out of 18 Grand Prix’s. He also made the podium in every single race he competed in that year.

=== 2020 ===
In 2020, it was Prado's debut year in the MXGP class with the Red Bull KTM De Carli team. For the season, he won three Grand Prix’s at round 7, 12 & 14. He was also on the podium at 8 of the 18 rounds. He placed sixth in the final standings, in his debut year in the MXGP class.

=== 2021 ===
For the 2021 season, Prado remained with KTM. He only managed one Grand Prix win at round 5 in Loket, Czech Republic. He also podiumed 5 out of the 18 events, which led him to a fifth place finish in the final championship standings.

=== 2022 ===
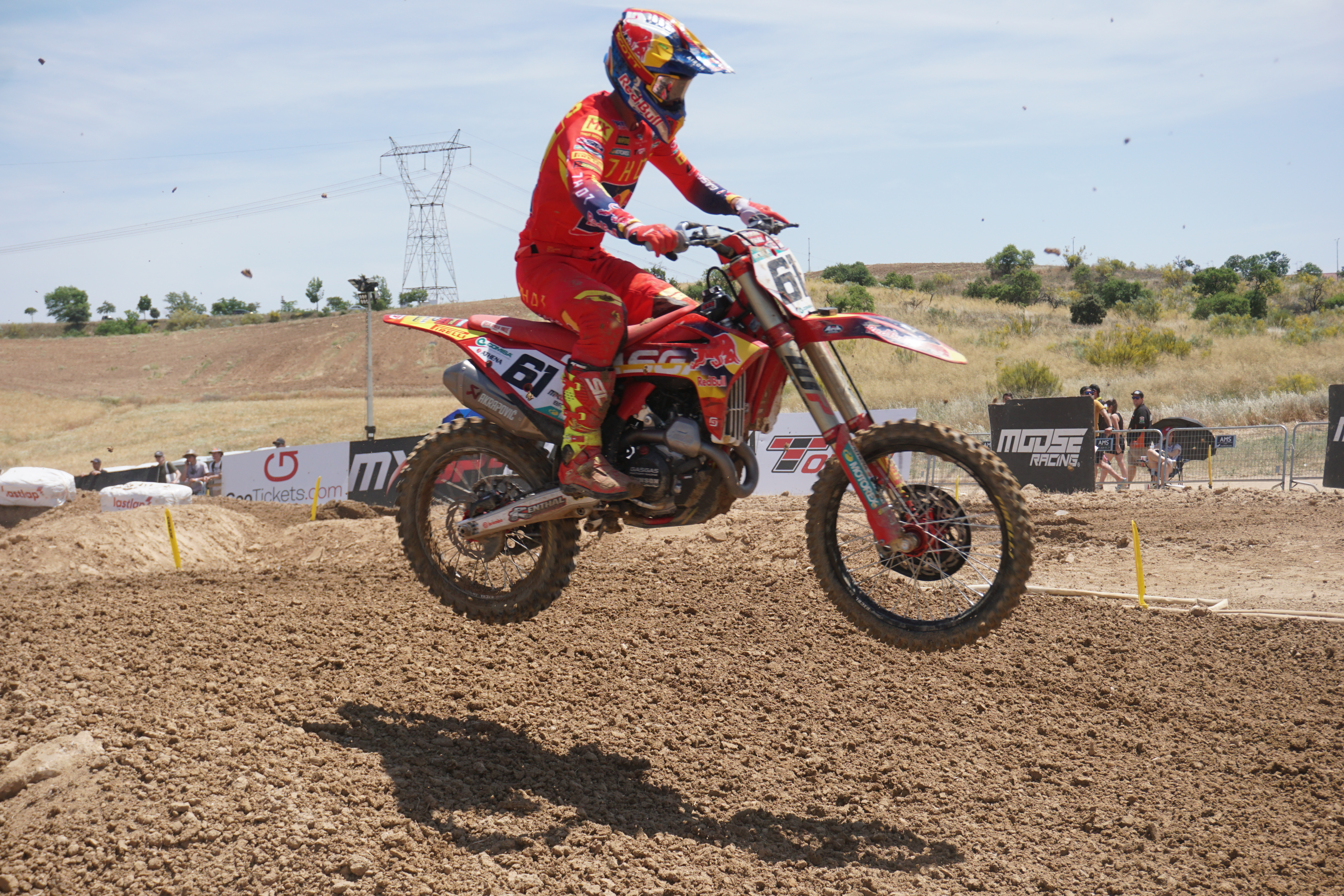
Prado in 2022.

For 2022, Prado remained with De Carli but switched to GasGas when the team transitioned away from KTM. For the season, Prado managed one GP win at round 4 in Portugal, as well as 10 out of 17 podiums, on his way to a third place finish in the championship.

=== 2023 ===
Prado clinched the 2023 MXGP World Championship at round eighteen in the MXGP of Maggiora, Italy. He had 14 holeshots, 11 qualifying race wins, 14 moto wins, 16 podium finishes and two Grand Prix victories.

After winning the MXGP World Championship, Prado posted several videos on his social media accounts showing him training at a supercross track in California, leading to speculation he may leave MXGP to race in the SuperMotocross World Championship. On November 9, 2023, Prado clarified his future racing plans on the motocross focused podcast Gypsy Tales. On December 1, 2023, Prado and GasGas announced that he would enter the first three rounds of the 2024 Supercross season, making his official supercross debut. Prado joined Sébastien Tortelli as the only reigning premier class motocross world champion to race supercross in the same year.

=== 2024 ===
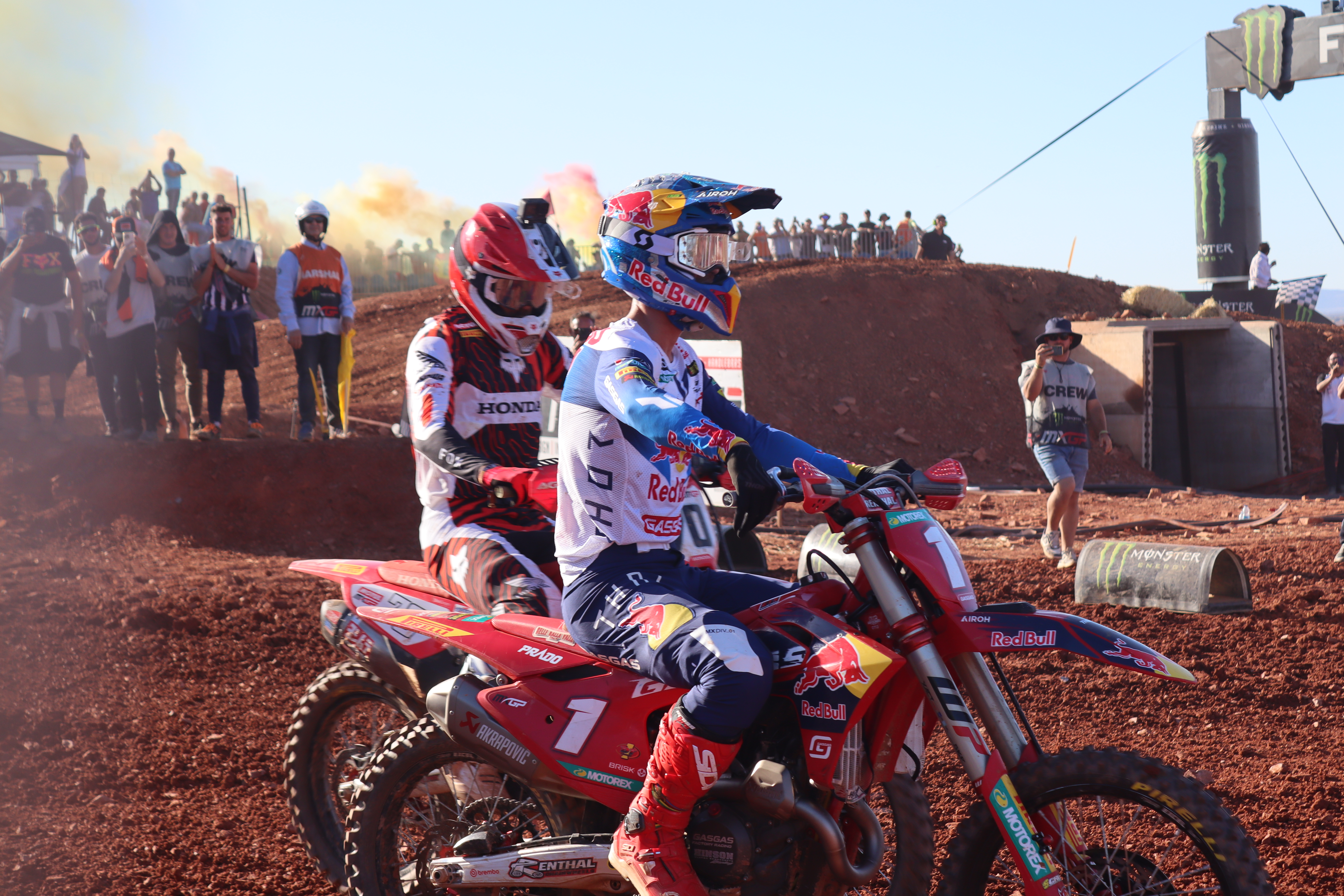
Prado in 2024 #1

2024 AMA Supercross

Prado raced the first four rounds of the 2024 AMA Supercross Championship as a preview for 2025. Most notable was a heat race win in the Muddy conditions of San Francisco at round 2.

2024 FIM Motocross World Championship

For the 2024 FIM Motocross World Championship, Prado chose the number 1 over his 61 to defend his title.

Prado started the season strong, dominating the first 4 GP’s. He showcased his starting prowess, speed & consistency throughout the season, only dropping major points from mud races at rounds 5 & 10. He had to play catchup to Gajser who held a minor lead over Prado for a majority of the season. Going into the first moto of round 19/20, Gajser held a 14 point lead over Prado. After a first turn crash, Gajser broke a footpeg which relegated him to 17th, whereas Prado took a second place. Gajser would finish second in race two, Prado took the overall victory & a seven point lead for the final round. Prado successfully defended his MXGP World Championship in his final MXGP racing year & ended the season with 11GP wins, 16 podiums & two finishes outside the top-four.

=== 2025 ===
Prado’s 2025 season was a mix of high expectations, injury setbacks, and growing controversy.

Supercross

Prado’s Supercross debut began with promising qualifying speed, but his season was cut short when he dislocated his shoulder during qualifying at Anaheim 2. The injury required surgery, forcing him to withdraw from the remainder of the Supercross season. This incident effectively ended his rookie campaign before he could complete more than two rounds.

Motocross

After several months of recovery, Prado returned for the 2025 AMA Pro Motocross Championship. While he showed competitive pace at times, including several top-five moto finishes, he struggled to adapt consistently to the U.S. tracks and the Kawasaki KX450SR. Prado finished sixth overall in the final championship standings. Prado’s season was also marked by minor controversy. During the final rounds of Pro Motocross, some online commentators alleged that he intentionally rode slowly in qualifying at Budds Creek to avoid racing the event; however, these claims were not substantiated by official sources. Prado later addressed the speculation on social media, describing the 2025 season as “one of the most difficult of his career” and acknowledging struggles to feel comfortable on the Kawasaki platform.

== MXGP Career Results ==
Year	Rnd 1	Rnd 2	Rnd 3	Rnd 4	Rnd 5	Rnd 6	Rnd 7	Rnd 8	Rnd 9	Rnd 10	Rnd 11	Rnd 12	Rnd 13	Rnd 14	Rnd 15	Rnd 16	Rnd 17	Rnd 18	Rnd 19	Rnd 20	Average Finish	Podium Percent	Place
2016 MX2	OUT	OUT	OUT	OUT	OUT	OUT	OUT	OUT	OUT	OUT	OUT	OUT	OUT	OUT	OUT	3	19	16	-	-	12.67	33%	33rd
2017 MX2	8	25	2	21	1	23	4	11	6	9	DNF	DNF	5	1	5	2	DNF	1	8	-	8.25	31%	7th
2018 MX2	11	2	2	1	1	2	4	1	2	1	1	3	1	1	1	1	1	6	1	1	2.20	85%	1st
2019 MX2	1	OUT	1	1	1	1	1	1	1	1	1	1	1	1	1	3	1	1	-	-	1.11	100%	1st
2020 MXGP	10	9	7	17	3	5	1	3	3	2	9	1	3	1	OUT	OUT	OUT	OUT	-	-	5.28	57%	6th
2021 MXGP	7	5	4	4	1	4	2	2	10	2	9	14	2	13	13	6	7	5	-	-	6.11	28%	5th
2022 MXGP	2	3	3	1	3	12	OUT	2	5	2	3	2	5	8	5	11	3	6	-	-	4.47	59%	3rd
2023 MXGP	3	3	2	1	3	4	3	2	1	2	2	2	2	2	3	2	10	2	10	-	3.00	84%	1st
2024 MXGP	1	1	1	1	13	1	4	1	3	10	1	4	2	2	1	2	3	1	1	1	2.64	80%	1st

== AMA Supercross/Motocross results ==
Year	Rnd 1	Rnd 2	Rnd 3	Rnd 4	Rnd 5	Rnd 6	Rnd 7	Rnd 8	Rnd 9	Rnd 10	Rnd 11	Rnd 12	Rnd 13	Rnd 14	Rnd 15	Rnd 16	Rnd 17	Average Finish	Podium Percent	Place
2024 450 SX	13 ANA (California)	7 SFR (California)	11 SDI (California)	12 ANA (California)	-	-	-	-	-	-	-	-	-	-	-	-	-	10.75	-	22nd
2025 450 SX	14 ANA (California)	12 SDI (California)	DNQ	OUT	OUT	OUT	OUT	OUT	OUT	OUT	OUT	OUT	OUT	OUT	OUT	OUT	OUT	13.00	-	30th
2025 450 MX	6 FOX (California)	9 HAN (California)	13 THU (Colorado)	17 HIG (Pennsylvania)	5 SOU (Massachusetts)	6 RED (Michigan)	9 SPR (Minnesota)	14 WAS (Washington (state))	5 IRN (Indiana)	12 UNA (New York (state))	10 BUD (Maryland)	-	-	-	-	-	-	9.64	-	6th
2026 450 SX	3 ANA (California)	13 SDI (California)	7 ANA (California)	7 HOU (Texas)	5 GLE (Arizona)	OUT SEA (Washington (state))	OUT ARL (Texas)	OUT DAY (Florida)	6 IND (Indiana)	7 BIR (Alabama)	13 DET (Michigan)	4 STL (Missouri)	13 NAS (Tennessee)	15 CLE (Ohio)	16 PHI (Pennsylvania)	6 DEN (Colorado)	3 SLC (Utah)	8.42	14%	9th
2026 450 MX	2 FOX (California)	17 HAN (California)	5 THU (Colorado)	4 HIG (Pennsylvania)	2 RED (Michigan)	4 SOU (Massachusetts)	6 SPR (Minnesota)	4 WAS (Washington (state))	2 UNA (New York (state))	2 BUD (Maryland)	1 IRN (Indiana)	-	-	-	-	-	-	4.45	45%	4th

Notes:

- 1) Prado raced a partial supercross schedule in 2024.

== SMX Results ==
Year	Rnd 1	Rnd 2	Rnd 3	Average Finish	Podium Percent	Place
2025 450 SMX	OUT CON (North Carolina)	OUT STL (Missouri)	OUT LVE (Nevada)	-	-	-
2026 450 SMX	3 COL (Ohio)	1 LOS (California)	2 RID (Missouri)	2.00	100%	1st
