= Spanish Motocross Championship =

Premier domestic Spanish Motocross series

- Spanish Motocross Championship logo
- Category: Motocross
- Country: Spain
- Inaugural season: 1959

The Spanish Motocross Championship (Spanish: Campeonato de España de Motocross) is the premier domestic Spanish Motocross series, sanctioned by the Real Federación Motociclista Española.

The series runs annually throughout late winter and spring each year. The premier classes are the Elite-MX1 and Elite-MX2 but there are also classes for younger riders, masters and women.

== History ==
The Spanish Motocross Championship has existed since 1959. Several riders have had periods of dominance in the history of the championship, with José Butrón holding the highest number of titles at twelve. The classes within the championship have evolved over time in line with what has been seen in the sport around the world.

== Event Format ==
Rounds of the Spanish Motocross Championship typically have a two day format. The Elite categories hold their qualifying on the first day, with the main races taking place on the second day. In addition to timed practice sessions, Elite categories compete in a qualifying race (in a similar vain to what happens in the FIM Motocross World Championship) to earn their starting order for the main races. From 2023 onwards, the top-five finishers of the qualifying race will receive points. These points will go towards their championship total, but will not go towards their total for each round.

Points are awarded to the top-five finishers of the qualifying race, in the following format:

Position	1st	2nd	3rd	4th	5th
Points	5	4	3	2	1

Points are awarded to finishers of the main races, in the following format:

Position	1st	2nd	3rd	4th	5th	6th	7th	8th	9th	10th	11th	12th	13th	14th	15th	16th	17th	18th	19th	20th
Points	25	22	20	18	16	15	14	13	12	11	10	9	8	7	6	5	4	3	2	1

== Broadcast ==
The comprehensive broadcast of each round of the Spanish Motocross Championship is currently via a live stream on the RFME's official YouTube channel.

== List of Champions ==
Season	Elite-MX1 Champion	Elite-MX2 Champion	MX125 Champion
2026	(Spain) José Butrón (KTM)	(Spain) Adriá Monné (Gas Gas)	(Spain) Oleguer Riba (Gas Gas)
2025	(Spain) José Butrón (KTM)	(Spain) Adriá Monné (Gas Gas)	(Spain) Samuel Tapia (Gas Gas)
2024	(Spain) José Butrón (KTM)	(Spain) Gerard Congost (Gas Gas)	(Spain) Salvador Pérez (Gas Gas)
2023	(Spain) José Butrón (KTM)	(Spain) Gerard Congost (Gas Gas)	(Spain) Elias Escandell (Fantic)
2022	(Spain) José Butrón (KTM)	(Spain) David Braceras (KTM)	(Spain) Francisco García (Husqvarna)
2021	(Spain) Carlos Campano (Yamaha)	(Spain) Rubén Fernández (Honda)	(Spain) Adriá Monné (KTM)
2020	(Spain) Nil Arcarons (Husqvarna)	(Spain) Rubén Fernández (Yamaha)	(Spain) Guillem Farrés (Gas Gas)
2019	(Spain) Ander Valentín (Husqvarna)	(Spain) Iker Larrañaga (KTM)	(Spain) Gerard Congost (KTM)
2018	(Spain) José Butrón (KTM)	(Spain) Iker Larrañaga (Husqvarna)	-
2017	(Spain) José Butrón (KTM)	(Spain) Simeó Ubach (KTM)	-
2016	(Spain) José Butrón (KTM)	(Spain) Oriol Casas (Yamaha)	-
2015	(Spain) José Butrón (KTM)	(Spain) Iker Larrañaga (KTM)	-
2014	(Spain) José Butrón (KTM)	(Spain) Ander Valentín (Yamaha)	-
2013	(Spain) José Butrón (KTM)	(Spain) Ander Valentín (Yamaha)	-
	MX Elite Champion	MX2 Champion	
2012	(Spain) Jonathan Barragán (Honda)	(Spain) Nil Arcarons (KTM)	-
2011	(Spain) Jonathan Barragán (Kawasaki)	(Spain) José Luis Martínez (KTM)	-
2010	(Spain) Álvaro Lozano (Yamaha)	(Spain) José Butrón (Suzuki)	-
2009	(Spain) Carlos Campano (Yamaha)	(Spain) Cristian Oliva (Yamaha)	-
2008	(Spain) Jonathan Barragán (KTM)	(Spain) Francisco José Millán (KTM)	-
	MX1 Champion		
2007	(Spain) Jonathan Barragán (KTM)	(Spain) Xavier Hernández (Yamaha)	-
2006	(Spain) Javier García Vico (Honda)	(Spain) Carlos Campano (KTM)	-
2005	(Spain) Javier García Vico (Honda)	(Spain) Xavier Hernández (Yamaha)	-
	Open Champion	125cc Champion	
2004	(Spain) Álvaro Lozano (KTM)	(Spain) Jonathan Barragán (KTM)	-
2003	(Spain) Javier García Vico (KTM)	(Spain) Jonathan Barragán (KTM)	-
2002	(Spain) Javier García Vico (KTM)	(Spain) Jonathan Barragán (KTM)	-
2001	(Spain) Javier García Vico (KTM)	(Spain) Abel Bernárdez (Honda)	-
	250cc Champion	125cc Champion	
2000	(Spain) Javier García Vico (Yamaha)	(Spain) Moisés Bernárdez (Honda)	-
1999	(Spain) Javier García Vico (Yamaha)	(Spain) Moisés Bernárdez (Honda)	-
1998	(Spain) Javier García Vico (Yamaha)	(Spain) Moisés Bernárdez (Honda)	-
1997	(Spain) Javier García Vico (Yamaha)	(Spain) Moisés Bernárdez (Honda)	-
1996	(Spain) José del Barrio (KTM)	(Spain) Moisés Bernárdez (Kawasaki)	-
1995	(Spain) Josep Alonso (Honda)	(Spain) Moisés Bernárdez (Kawasaki)	-
1994	(Spain) Josep Alonso (Honda)	(Spain) Moisés Bernárdez (Kawasaki)	-
1993	(Spain) Josep Alonso (Honda)	(Spain) Abel Bernárdez (Yamaha)	-
1992	(Spain) Luis López (Honda)	(Spain) Moisés Bernárdez (Yamaha)	-
1991	(Spain) Luis López (Honda)	(Spain) Moisés Bernárdez (Yamaha)	-
1990	(Spain) Luis López (Honda)	(Spain) Josep Alonso (Yamaha)	-
1989	(Spain) Pablo Colomina (Yamaha)	(Spain) José María González (Honda)	-
1988	(Spain) Luis López (Honda)	(Spain) Josep Alonso (Yamaha)	-
1987	(Spain) Pablo Colomina (Honda)	(Spain) José María González (Honda)	-
1986	(Spain) Pablo Colomina (KTM)	(Spain) Toni Elías (Yamaha)	-
1985	(Spain) Pablo Colomina (KTM)	(Spain) Juan José Barragán (Yamaha)	-
1984	(Spain) Pablo Colomina (KTM)	(Spain) Jordi Elías (Cagiva)	-
			500cc Champion
1983	(Spain) Toni Arcarons (Honda)	(Spain) Toni Elías (Derbi)	(Spain) Pablo Colomina (KTM)
1982	(Spain) Toni Elías (Derbi)	(Spain) Toni Elías (Derbi)	(Spain) Fernando Muñoz (Beta/Yamaha)
1981	(Spain) Toni Elías (Derbi)	(Spain) Toni Elías (Derbi)	(Spain) Juan José Barragán (Montesa)
1980	(Spain) Toni Arcarons (Montesa)	(Spain) Toni Elías (Derbi)	(Spain) Toni Arcarons (Montesa)
1979	(Spain) Toni Elías (Bultaco)	-	-
1978	(Spain) Toni Elías (Bultaco)	-	(Spain) Fernando Muñoz (Montesa)
1977	(Spain) Toni Elías (Bultaco)	-	-
1976	(Spain) Fernando Muñoz (Montesa)	-	-
1975	(Spain) Jorge Capapey (Bultaco)	-	-
1974	(Spain) José Ángel Mendívil (Bultaco)	-	-
1973	(Spain) Jorge Capapey (Bultaco)	(Spain) José Ángel Mendívil (Bultaco)	-
1972	(Spain) Domingo Gris (Bultaco)	(Spain) Domingo Gris (Bultaco)	-
1971	(Spain) Jorge Capapey (Bultaco)	-	-
1970	(Spain) Domingo Gris (Bultaco)	-	-
1969	(Spain) José Sánchez (Bultaco)	-	-
1968	(Spain) José Sánchez (Bultaco)	-	-
1967	(Spain) José Sánchez (Bultaco)	-	-
1966	(Spain) Pedro Pi (Montesa)	-	-
1965	(Spain) Pedro Pi (Montesa)	-	-
1964	(Spain) Oriol Puig (Bultaco)	(Spain) José Sánchez (Bultaco)	-
1963	(Spain) Oriol Puig (Bultaco)	(Spain) Pedro Pi (Montesa)	-
1962	(Spain) Pedro Pi (Montesa)	(Spain) José Sánchez (Bultaco)	-
1961	(Spain) Pedro Pi (Montesa)	(Spain) Pedro Pi (Montesa)	-
			Superiores Champion
1960	(Spain) Juan Elizalde (Ossa)	(Spain) Oriol Puig (Bultaco)	(Spain) Andrés Basolí (Derbi)
1959	(Spain) José Antonio Elizalde (Ossa)	-	(Spain) Andrés Basolí (Derbi)
