= List of 2023 national motocross champions =

List of national motocross champions in 2023

National level motocross championships that act as the highest level of the sport domestically, are being held throughout the year. These championships are typically sanctioned by the country's national motorcycle federation, who in turn are affiliates of the Fédération Internationale de Motocyclisme.

Riders compete for the crown of national champion in their respective category.

== 2023 champions ==
=== Senior Men's ===
Country	Series	Champion	refer
Argentina	Argentinian Motocross Championship	MX1: (Argentina) Joaquín Poli	2023 Argentinian Motocross Championship
Argentina	Argentinian Motocross Championship	MX2: (Argentina) Tomas Matkovich	2023 Argentinian Motocross Championship
Australia	ProMX	MX1: (Australia) Dean Ferris	2023 ProMX Championship
Australia	ProMX	MX2: (Australia) Wilson Todd	2023 ProMX Championship
Austria	Austrian Motocross Championship	MX Open: (Austria) Marcel Stauffer	2023 Austrian Motocross Championship
Austria	Austrian Motocross Championship	MX2: (Austria) Marcel Stauffer	2023 Austrian Motocross Championship
Bosnia and Herzegovina	Bosnian Motocross Championship	MX1: (Bosnia and Herzegovina) Mario Kojić	2023 Bosnian Motocross Championship
Bosnia and Herzegovina	Bosnian Motocross Championship	MX2: (Bosnia and Herzegovina) Rok Krajc	2023 Bosnian Motocross Championship
Brazil	Brazilian Motocross Championship	MX1: (Brazil) Fábio Santos	2023 Brazilian Motocross Championship
Brazil	Brazilian Motocross Championship	MX2: (Brazil) Guilherme Bresolin	2023 Brazilian Motocross Championship
Bulgaria	Republican Motocross Championship	MX1: (Bulgaria) Julian Georgiev	2023 Republican Motocross Championship
Bulgaria	Republican Motocross Championship	MX2: (Bulgaria) Nikolay Malinov	2023 Republican Motocross Championship
Canada	Triple Crown Series	450 Pro: (Canada) Dylan Wright	2023 Triple Crown Series
Canada	Triple Crown Series	250 Pro: (Canada) Ryder McNabb	2023 Triple Crown Series
Chile	Chilean Motocross Championship	MX1A: (Chile) Sergio Villaronga	2023 Chilean Motocross Championship
Chile	Chilean Motocross Championship	MX2A: (Chile) Jeremias Schiele	2023 Chilean Motocross Championship
Croatia	Croatian Motocross Championship	MX Open: (Croatia) Matija Kelava	2023 Croatian Motocross Championship
Croatia	Croatian Motocross Championship	MX2: (Croatia) Luka Kunić	2023 Croatian Motocross Championship
Czech Republic	Czech Motocross Championship	MX1: (Czech Republic) Jakub Terešák	2023 Czech Motocross Championship
Czech Republic	Czech Motocross Championship	MX2: (Czech Republic) Martin Krč	2023 Czech Motocross Championship
Denmark	Danish Motocross Championship	MX1: (Denmark) Mathias Jørgensen	2023 Danish Motocross Championship
Denmark	Danish Motocross Championship	MX2: (Denmark) Rasmus Pedersen	2023 Danish Motocross Championship
Ecuador	Ecuadorian Motocross Championship	MX1: (Ecuador) Miguel Cordovez	2023 Ecuadorian Motocross Championship
Ecuador	Ecuadorian Motocross Championship	MX2A: (Ecuador) Andrés Feicán	2023 Ecuadorian Motocross Championship
Estonia	Estonian Motocross Championship	MX Open: (Estonia) Tanel Leok	2023 Estonian Motocross Championship
Estonia	Estonian Motocross Championship	MX2: (Estonia) Kaarel Tilk	2023 Estonian Motocross Championship
Finland	Finnish Motocross Championship	MX1: (Finland) Jere Haavisto	2023 Finnish Motocross Championship
Finland	Finnish Motocross Championship	MX2: (Finland) Sampo Rainio	2023 Finnish Motocross Championship
France	French Elite Motocross Championship	MX1: (Switzerland) Valentin Guillod	2023 French Elite Motocross Championship
France	French Elite Motocross Championship	MX2: (France) Pierre Goupillon	2023 French Elite Motocross Championship
Germany	ADAC MX Masters	Masters: (Germany) Max Nagl	2023 ADAC MX Masters
Germany	ADAC MX Masters	Youngster: (Spain) Oriol Oliver	2023 ADAC MX Masters
Greece	Panhellenic Motocross Championship	MX1: (Greece) Panagiotis Kouzis	2023 Panhellenic Motocross Championship
Greece	Panhellenic Motocross Championship	MX2: (Greece) Fragiskos Zounis	2023 Panhellenic Motocross Championship
Hungary	Hungarian Motocross Championship	Elite MX1: (Hungary) Erik Hugyecz	2023 Hungarian Motocross Championship
Hungary	Hungarian Motocross Championship	Elite MX2: (Hungary) Bence Pergel	2023 Hungarian Motocross Championship
Iceland	Icelandic Motocross Championship	MX1: (Iceland) Máni Freyr Pétursson	2023 Icelandic Motocross Championship
Iceland	Icelandic Motocross Championship	MX2: (Iceland) Eiður Orri Pálmarsson	2023 Icelandic Motocross Championship
Indonesia	Indonesian Motocross Championship	MX1: (Indonesia) Hilman Maksum	2023 Indonesian Motocross Championship
Indonesia	Indonesian Motocross Championship	MX2: (Indonesia) Diva Ismayana	2023 Indonesian Motocross Championship
Israel	Israeli Motocross Championship	MX1:	2023 Israeli Motocross Championship
Israel	Israeli Motocross Championship	MX2:	2023 Israeli Motocross Championship
Italy	Italian Prestige Motocross Championship	MX1: (Italy) Alberto Forato	2023 Italian Prestige Motocross Championship
Italy	Italian Prestige Motocross Championship	MX2: (Netherlands) Cas Valk	2023 Italian Prestige Motocross Championship
Japan	All Japan Motocross Championship	IA1: (Australia) Jay Wilson	2023 All Japan Motocross Championship
Japan	All Japan Motocross Championship	IA2: (Spain) Víctor Alonso	2023 All Japan Motocross Championship
Latvia	Latvian Motocross Championship	MX1: (Latvia) Toms Macuks	2023 Latvian Motocross Championship
Latvia	Latvian Motocross Championship	MX2: (Latvia) Edvards Bidzāns	2023 Latvian Motocross Championship
Lithuania	Lithuanian Motocross Championship	MX1: (Lithuania) Arminas Jasikonis	2023 Lithuanian Motocross Championship
Lithuania	Lithuanian Motocross Championship	MX2: (Latvia) Uldis Freibergs	2023 Lithuanian Motocross Championship
Mexico	Mexican Motocross Championship	MX1: (Bolivia) Marco Antezana	2023 Mexican Motocross Championship
Mexico	Mexican Motocross Championship	MX2: (Mexico) Víctor Francisco García	2023 Mexican Motocross Championship
Netherlands	Dutch Masters of Motocross	500cc: (Netherlands) Jeffrey Herlings	2023 Dutch Masters of Motocross
Netherlands	Dutch Masters of Motocross	250cc: (Netherlands) Kay de Wolf	2023 Dutch Masters of Motocross
New Zealand	New Zealand Motocross Championship	MX1: (New Zealand) Maximus Purvis	2023 New Zealand Motocross Championship
New Zealand	New Zealand Motocross Championship	MX2: (New Zealand) Cody Cooper	2023 New Zealand Motocross Championship
Norway	Norwegian Motocross Championship	MX Open: (Norway) Cornelius Tøndel	2023 Norwegian Motocross Championship
Norway	Norwegian Motocross Championship	MX2: (Norway) Cornelius Tøndel	2023 Norwegian Motocross Championship
Poland	Polish Motocross Championship	MX Open: (Poland) Szymon Staszkiewicz	2023 Polish Motocross Championship
Poland	Polish Motocross Championship	MX2: (Poland) Piotr Szczepanek	2023 Polish Motocross Championship
Portugal	Portuguese Motocross Championship	MX1: (Portugal) Paulo Alberto	2023 Portuguese Motocross Championship
Portugal	Portuguese Motocross Championship	MX2: (Spain) Eric Tomás	2023 Portuguese Motocross Championship
Romania	Romanian Motocross Championship	MX1: (Romania) George Căbăl	2023 Romanian Motocross Championship
Romania	Romanian Motocross Championship	MX2: (Romania) Aida Cojanu	2023 Romanian Motocross Championship
Slovakia	Slovak Motocross Championship	MX Open: (Slovakia) Šimon Jošt	2023 Slovak Motocross Championship
Slovakia	Slovak Motocross Championship	MX2: (Czech Republic) Martin Krč	2023 Slovak Motocross Championship
Slovenia	Slovenian Motocross Championship	MX Open: (Slovenia) Miha Bubnič	2023 Slovenian Motocross Championship
Slovenia	Slovenian Motocross Championship	MX2: (Slovenia) Gal Hauptman	2023 Slovenian Motocross Championship
South Africa	South African Motocross Championship	MX1: (South Africa) Cameron Durow	2023 South African Motocross Championship
South Africa	South African Motocross Championship	MX2: (South Africa) Cameron Durow	2023 South African Motocross Championship
Spain	Spanish Motocross Championship	Elite-MX1: (Spain) José Butrón	2023 Spanish Motocross Championship
Spain	Spanish Motocross Championship	Elite-MX2: (Spain) Gerard Congost	2023 Spanish Motocross Championship
Sweden	Swedish Motocross Championship	MX1: (Sweden) Anton Gole	2023 Swedish Motocross Championship
Sweden	Swedish Motocross Championship	MX2: (Sweden) Filip Bengtsson	2023 Swedish Motocross Championship
Switzerland	Swiss Motocross Championship	MX Open: (Switzerland) Arnaud Tonus	2023 Swiss Motocross Championship
Switzerland	Swiss Motocross Championship	MX2: (Belgium) Bryan Boulard	2023 Swiss Motocross Championship
Turkey	Turkish Motocross Championship	MX1: (Turkey) Aleksandr Kurashev	2023 Turkish Motocross Championship
Turkey	Turkish Motocross Championship	MX2: (Turkey) Ata Kuzu	2023 Turkish Motocross Championship
United Kingdom	British Motocross Championship	MX1: (United Kingdom) Conrad Mewse	2023 British Motocross Championship
United Kingdom	British Motocross Championship	MX2: (Sweden) Isak Gifting	2023 British Motocross Championship
United States	AMA Motocross Championship	450MX: (Australia) Jett Lawrence	2023 AMA National Motocross Championship
United States	AMA Motocross Championship	250MX: (Australia) Hunter Lawrence	2023 AMA National Motocross Championship
Uruguay	Uruguayan Motocross Championship	MX1: (Uruguay) Nicolás Rolando	2023 Uruguayan Motocross Championship
Uruguay	Uruguayan Motocross Championship	MX2A: (Uruguay) Alfonso Bratschi	2023 Uruguayan Motocross Championship
Venezuela	Venezuelan Motocross Championship	MX1 Experto: (Venezuela) Daniel Bortolín	2023 Venezuelan Motocross Championship
Venezuela	Venezuelan Motocross Championship	MX2 Experto: (Venezuela) Daniel Bortolín	2023 Venezuelan Motocross Championship
