= 2026 Spanish Motocross Championship =

Spanish National Motocross Competition in 2026

The 2026 Spanish Motocross Championship season was the 68th Spanish Motocross Championship season.

The series consisted of seven rounds across the country, running from February to October. José Butrón was the reigning champion in the Elite-MX1 class, after winning his eleventh senior title in 2025. After the first part of the season was dominated by MXGP rider Rubén Fernández, Butrón was able to capitalise on a late season injury for the factory Honda man, winning two of the last three rounds and taking his twelfth senior national title. This was also Butrón's consecutive Elite-MX1 title.

Adrià Monné was the reigning champion in the Elite-MX2 class, after he won his first title in the previous season. Despite only taking one overall win throughout the season, Monné's consistency and the fact that he stayed injury-free meant that he was able to successfully defend his Elite-MX2 title.

The opening round, scheduled to be held at Montearagón on 14-15th of February was postponed due to track conditions following a period of heavy rain.

== Race calendar and results ==
=== Elite-MX1 ===
Round	Date	Location	Pole position	Race 1 Winner	Race 2 Winner	Round Winner
1	28 February–1 March	(Aragon) Calatayud	(Spain) Rubén Fernández	(Spain) Rubén Fernández	(Spain) Rubén Fernández	(Spain) Rubén Fernández
2	14–15 March	(Extremadura) Malpartida de Cáceres	(Spain) José Butrón	(Spain) Rubén Fernández	(Spain) Rubén Fernández	(Spain) Rubén Fernández
3	16–17 May	(Region of Murcia) Alhama de Murcia	(Spain) Rubén Fernández	(Spain) Rubén Fernández	(Spain) Rubén Fernández	(Spain) Rubén Fernández
4	13–14 June	(Castilla–La Mancha) Montearagón	(Spain) Rubén Fernández	(Spain) Rubén Fernández	(Spain) Rubén Fernández	(Spain) Rubén Fernández
5	19–20 September	(Aragon) MotorLand Aragón	(Spain) Gerard Congost	(Spain) José Butrón	(Spain) José Butrón	(Spain) José Butrón
6	17–18 October	(Andalusia) Morón de la Frontera	(Spain) Víctor Alonso	(Spain) Víctor Alonso	(Spain) Víctor Alonso	(Spain) Víctor Alonso
7	24–25 October	(Castilla–La Mancha) Talavera de la Reina	No Race	(Spain) José Butrón	(Spain) José Butrón	(Spain) José Butrón

=== Elite-MX2 ===
Round	Date	Location	Pole position	Race 1 Winner	Race 2 Winner	Round Winner
1	28 February–1 March	(Aragon) Calatayud	(Latvia) Jānis Reišulis	(Latvia) Jānis Reišulis	(Latvia) Jānis Reišulis	(Latvia) Jānis Reišulis
2	14–15 March	(Extremadura) Malpartida de Cáceres	(Spain) Adrià Monné	(Spain) Adrià Monné	(Spain) Adrià Monné	(Spain) Adrià Monné
3	16–17 May	(Region of Murcia) Alhama de Murcia	(Brazil) Bernardo Tibúrcio	(Brazil) Bernardo Tibúrcio	(Brazil) Bernardo Tibúrcio	(Brazil) Bernardo Tibúrcio
4	13–14 June	(Castilla–La Mancha) Montearagón	(Spain) David Braceras	(Brazil) Bernardo Tibúrcio	(Brazil) Bernardo Tibúrcio	(Brazil) Bernardo Tibúrcio
5	19–20 September	(Aragon) MotorLand Aragón	(Spain) Elias Escandell	(Spain) Bruno Miró	(Spain) Bruno Miró	(Spain) Bruno Miró
6	17–18 October	(Andalusia) Morón de la Frontera	(Spain) Adrià Monné	(Spain) Samuel Tapia	(Spain) Adrià Monné	(Spain) Bruno Miró
7	24–25 October	(Castilla–La Mancha) Talavera de la Reina	No Race	(Spain) Salvador Pérez	(Spain) Salvador Pérez	(Spain) Salvador Pérez

=== Circuit locations ===
2026 Spanish Motocross Championship locations

== Elite-MX1 ==
=== Participants ===
Team	Constructor	No	Rider	Rounds
Tallares El Solo	Honda	2	(Spain) David Peláez	6
Mequitec Gas Gas Racing Team	Gas Gas	4	(Spain) Gerard Congost	All
Beta Trueba MX Racing Team	Beta	5	(Spain) Carlos Abel	All
Motos BR	Husqvarna	7	(Spain) Nil Bussot	1
	Honda	8	(Spain) José Francisco Gutiérrez	6
	Fantic	9	(Spain) Carlos Ferrera	1
Andreu28 Competicion	Yamaha	13	(Spain) Ivan Lacuesta	4–5, 7
Motos VR Yamaha Racing Team	Yamaha	15	(Portugal) Luís Outeiro	2
Pozos y Perforaciones	Husqvarna	15	(Spain) Francisco Javier González	6
KTM TRT Motorcycle	KTM	17	(Spain) José Butrón	All
KTM TRT Motorcycle	KTM	25	(Spain) Bruno Darias	1–3, 5, 7
	Gas Gas	28	(Spain) Marcos Gutiérrez	1–2
Team Cebri	KTM	35	(Spain) Pablo Cebrian	7
Team Cebri	Honda	94	(Spain) Álvaro Cebrian	7
Team Castro MX	Kawasaki	51	(Spain) Sergio Castro	1
DLR57	Husqvarna	57	(Spain) Pablo de la Rosa	4
JRB Off Road	KTM	64	(Spain) Roberto Otero	All
Zalla Off Road	Suzuki	68	(Spain) Unai Larrañaga	7
Honda HRC Petronas	Honda	70	(Spain) Rubén Fernández	1–4
	Honda	71	(Spain) Daniel Macho	6
TeamX Reina	Yamaha	80	(Spain) Sergio Sánchez	1–2, 7
DT Works Racing	Yamaha	81	(Spain) Eric Tomas	6–7
Motos Franmi	Yamaha	84	(Spain) Pedro José Alcazar	3
Yamaha Mastercross	Yamaha	85	(Spain) Jonathan Marquez	2
	KTM	90	(Spain) Biel Pons	5
Team Salgueiro	Yamaha	91	(Portugal) Francisco Salgueiro	1–2, 7
Triumph Racing Pavo & Rueda	Triumph	92	(Spain) Ander Valentín	1–3, 5–6
Ducati Racing Team España	Ducati	96	(Spain) Víctor Alonso	All
SB2 MX Talents Team	KTM	111	(Spain) Lucas Bodega	1–2
	KTM	112	(Spain) Marc Pamias	5
Rent.Moto.PT	Husqvarna	117	(Ukraine) Ruslan Yefremian	2
Rent.Moto.PT	Honda	641	(Ukraine) Semen Nerush	2
	Yamaha	117	(Spain) Miguel Ángel Aragon	6
	Yamah	125	(Spain) Alex Marin	5
Team El Motorista	Triumph	135	(Spain) Heriberto Cruz	6
	Beta	169	(Spain) David Noya	1, 3–5
Tecni Bikes Motorsport	Kawasaki	192	(Spain) David Villalba	6
Ducati Lisboa	Ducati	219	(Portugal) Martim Palma	2
Acema Motor Team	Honda	219	(Spain) David Jiménez	3, 7
Larry Bikes/Ankisol/HRP/DPS	Honda	241	(Spain) Borja Mugica	3
Otañes School	Yamaha	270	(Spain) David Gómez	7
Team Lebri	Yamaha	313	(Spain) Álex Romero	1–4
	Kawasaki	314	(Spain) Javier Andrade	6
Ausió Racing Team - Yamaha	Yamaha	368	(Spain) Samuel Nilsson	1–4
JMC Gas Gas	Gas Gas	370	(Spain) Xavier Camps	4
Nilsson Training	Gas Gas	444	(Iceland) Ingvar Sverrir Einarsson	1–2
Team JCR Fantic	Fantic	501	(Spain) Roger Oliver	1–5, 7
Team JCR Fantic	Fantic	827	(Spain) Aleix Diaz	5
Team JCR Fantic	Fantic	848	(Spain) Joan Cros	5
	KTM	628	(Spain) Alfredo Lancha	7
	Honda	735	(Spain) Pedro Jesús Herrera	2, 6
	KTM	817	(Spain) Dario Montanos	5
DT Works Racing - MFIE	KTM	961	(Spain) Oscar Corominas	7

=== Riders Championship ===
Points are awarded to the top-five finishers of the qualifying race, in the following format:

Position	1st	2nd	3rd	4th	5th
Points	5	4	3	2	1

Points are awarded to finishers of the main races, in the following format:

Position	1st	2nd	3rd	4th	5th	6th	7th	8th	9th	10th	11th	12th	13th	14th	15th	16th	17th	18th	19th	20th
Points	25	22	20	18	16	15	14	13	12	11	10	9	8	7	6	5	4	3	2	1

Pos	Rider	Bike	CAL (Aragon)		MAL (Extremadura)		ALH (Region of Murcia)		MON (Castilla–La Mancha)		MAR (Aragon)		MDF (Andalusia)		TAL (Castilla–La Mancha)		Points
1	(Spain) José Butrón	KTM	3^{+4}	2	2^{+5}	2	3^{+4}	2	2^{+4}	2	1^{+4}	1	2^{+4}	2	1	1	341
2	(Spain) Víctor Alonso	Ducati	6	4	4^{+3}	6	5^{+2}	3	3^{+2}	3	2^{+3}	4	1^{+5}	1	2	2	291
3	(Spain) Gerard Congost	Gas Gas	2^{+3}	5	5^{+2}	3	6	8	5^{+1}	4	3^{+5}	2	3^{+2}	9	3	3	263
4	(Spain) Rubén Fernández	Honda	1^{+5}	1	1	1	1^{+5}	1	1^{+5}	1							215
5	(Spain) Carlos Abel	Beta	9	8	DNS	12	9	7	9	7	7	8	6^{+1}	4	6	6	177
6	(Spain) Roger Oliver	Fantic	7	6	7	8	7	5	6	6	6	5			7	5	177
7	(Spain) Roberto Otero	KTM	13	17	17	14	8	11	7	8	8	9	4	3	10	9	159
8	(Spain) Samuel Nilsson	Yamaha	5^{+1}	3	3	7	4^{+3}	4	4^{+3}	5							147
9	(Spain) Ander Valentín	Triumph	4^{+2}	16	11^{+4}	4	2^{+1}	6			4^{+2}	6	DNS	DNS			130
10	(Spain) Álex Romero	Yamaha	11	11	13	10	10	9	8	9							87
11	(Spain) Bruno Darias	KTM	12	10	12	13	14	12			13	16			18	DNS	69
12	(Spain) David Noya	Beta	15	13			11	13	11	12	16	12					65
13	(Spain) Ivan Lacuesta	Yamaha							12	11	12	11			11	11	58
14	(Spain) Eric Tomas	Yamaha											12^{+3}	DNS	4	4	48
15	(Spain) David Jiménez	Honda					15	10							8	8	43
16	(Spain) Joan Cros	Fantic									5^{+1}	3					37
17	(Portugal) Francisco Salgueiro	Yamaha	16	14	16	16									15	12	37
18	(Spain) Heriberto Cruz	Triumph											5	5			32
19	(Portugal) Luís Outeiro	Yamaha			6^{+1}	5											32
20	(Spain) Sergio Sánchez	Yamaha	DNS	DNS	DNS	DNS									5	7	30
21	(Spain) David Peláez	Honda											8	6			28
22	(Spain) Francisco Javier González	Husqvarna											7	7			28
23	(Spain) Sergio Castro	Kawasaki	8	7													27
24	(Spain) Lucas Bodega	KTM	14	12	10	Ret											27
25	(Spain) Miguel Ángel Aragon	Yamaha											9	8			25
26	(Spain) Marc Pamias	KTM									11	7					24
27	(Ukraine) Semen Nerush	Honda			9	9											24
28	(Portugal) Martim Palma	Ducati			8	11											23
29	(Spain) Unai Larrañaga	Suzuki													9	10	23
30	(Spain) Biel Pons	KTM									9	10					23
31	(Spain) Nil Bussot	Husqvarna	10	9													23
32	(Spain) Pablo de la Rosa	Husqvarna							13	10							19
33	(Spain) Xavier Camps	Gas Gas							10	13							19
34	(Spain) Alex Marin	Yamaha									10	15					17
35	(Spain) Pedro Jesús Herrera	Honda			15	17							14	DNS			17
36	(Spain) Borja Mugica	Honda					12	14									16
37	(Iceland) Ingvar Sverrir Einarsson	Gas Gas	17	15	18	18											16
38	(Spain) Aleix Diaz	Fantic									14	13					15
39	(Spain) David Gómez	Yamaha													12	16	14
40	(Spain) Pedro José Alcazar	Yamaha					13	15									14
41	(Spain) Pablo Cebrian	KTM													16	13	13
42	(Spain) Alfredo Lancha	KTM													14	15	13
43	(Spain) David Montaños	KTM									15	14					13
44	(Spain) Jonathan Marquez	Yamaha			14	15											13
45	(Spain) Oscar Corominas	KTM													13	17	12
46	(Spain) Javier Andrade	Kawasaki											10	DNS			11
47	(Spain) Álvaro Cebrian	Honda													17	14	11
48	(Spain) Daniel Macho	Honda											11	DNS			10
49	(Spain) José Francisco Gutiérrez	Honda											13	DNS			8
50	(Spain) Marcos Gutiérrez	Gas Gas	18	DNS	19	19											7
51	(Ukraine) Ruslan Yefremian	Husqvarna			20	20											2
	(Spain) David Villalba	Kawasaki											DNS	DNS			0
	(Spain) Carlos Ferrera	Fantic	DNS	DNS													0
Pos	Rider	Bike	CAL (Aragon)		MAL (Extremadura)		ALH (Region of Murcia)		MON (Castilla–La Mancha)		MAR (Aragon)		MDF (Andalusia)		TAL (Castilla–La Mancha)		Points

== Elite-MX2 ==
=== Participants ===
Team	Constructor	No	Rider	Rounds
Triumph Racing Pavo & Rueda	Triumph	6	(Spain) Elias Escandell	5–7
Triumph Racing Pavo & Rueda	Triumph	22	(Spain) David Braceras	1–4
Triumph Racing Pavo & Rueda	Triumph	238	(Spain) Francisco Galán	5–7
Triumph Racing Pavo & Rueda	Triumph	351	(Spain) Carlos Prat	All
SB2 MX Talents Team	Gas Gas	11	(Spain) Gilen Albisua	All
SB2 MX Talents Team	Gas Gas	252	(Spain) Valentino Vázquez	1–4, 7
	Husqvarna	14	(Spain) Aniol Molas	1, 4
Acema Motor Team	Honda	18	(Spain) Francisco José Jimenez	2
Acema Motor Team	Honda	101	(Spain) Alfonso Pastor	1–5
Acema Motor Team	Honda	611	(Spain) Natalia Rosado	2
Motos Aleser	Husqvarna	19	(Spain) Antonio Galiano	2, 4
Motos Aleser	Husqvarna	112	(Spain) Víctor Beltrán	2
Arribas Triumph	Triumph	27	(Spain) Óscar Quirós	All
TeamX Reina	Yamaha	33	(Spain) Daniel Galvez	7
Yamaha 115 M78 Bedetec	Yamaha	37	(Brazil) Bernardo Tibúrcio	1–4
Yamaha 115 M78 Bedetec	Yamaha	300	(Spain) Salvador Pérez	All
Monster Energy Yamaha Factory MX2	Yamaha	47	(Latvia) Kārlis Reišulis	1
Monster Energy Yamaha Factory MX2	Yamaha	772	(Latvia) Jānis Reišulis	1
Team JCR Fantic	Fantic	68	(Spain) Unai Larrañaga	5
Team JCR Fantic	Fantic	114	(Israel) Tal Ovadia	7
Team JCR Fantic	Fantic	303	(Spain) Ot Marí	3–4
Boutaca Racing Team	KTM	78	(Portugal) Gonçalo Cardoso	2
Mequitec Gas Gas Racing Team	Gas Gas	82	(Spain) Manuel López	1–4
Mequitec Gas Gas Racing Team	Gas Gas	96	(Spain) Mauro Osinalde	1–3
Mequitec Gas Gas Racing Team	Gas Gas	240	(Chile) César Paine	5–7
Mequitec Gas Gas Racing Team	Gas Gas	255	(Spain) Daniela Guillén	2, 7
Mequitec Gas Gas Racing Team	Gas Gas	494	(Spain) Pablo Lara	All
Jezyk Racing Team	Triumph	86	(Spain) Daniel Castañondo	1–4
Jezyk Racing Team	Triumph	559	(France) Félix Cardineau	2
Schepers Racing	KTM	88	(Netherlands) Sven Dijk	1
	KTM	90	(Spain) Biel Pons	1
WP Eric Augé	KTM	93	(Israel) Inbar Selinger	3, 5, 7
	KTM	94	(Spain) Javier Salinas	1, 3, 7
Gas Gas TRT Motorcycles	Gas Gas	97	(Spain) Denis Canto	1–2
Gas Gas TRT Motorcycles	Gas Gas	268	(Spain) Samuel Tapia	2, 4–7
Gas Gas TRT Motorcycles	Gas Gas	365	(Spain) Adrià Monné	All
KTM TRT Motorcycle	KTM	114	(Ecuador) Allan Tapia	2
KTM TRT Motorcycle	KTM	166	(Spain) Álex Lasheras	All
KTM TRT Motorcycle	KTM	212	(Spain) Jaime Borrego	2, 6–7
	KTM	199	(Spain) Unai Samper	1–2
ETG Racing	KTM	204	(Spain) Roger Ponsa	1, 5
Team Castro MX	Kawasaki	208	(Spain) Izan Querol	4, 7
	Yamaha	215	(Spain) Sergio Borallo	6
Ausió Racing Team - Yamaha	Yamaha	217	(Spain) Ivan Polvillo	All
	KTM	223	(Spain) Roberto Rodríguez	1
	Husqvarna	272	(Spain) Alberto Villalba	1–4, 7
Andreu28 Competicion	Beta	314	(Spain) Ángel Martínez	3, 5
Bud Racing España	Gas Gas	337	(Spain) Bruno Miró	2–7
	Triumph	357	(Spain) Bitor Quintin	1
JMC Gas Gas	Gas Gas	370	(Spain) Xavier Camps	1–2
Dermotor	KTM	425	(Spain) Samuel Panzano	1
Dejalofluir444	Yamaha	431	(Spain) Mario Martín-Laliena	1–2
Dirt Store Triumph Racing	Triumph	441	(United Kingdom) Billy Askew	1
Frucasa Team MX	KTM	471	(Spain) Eric Casas	1, 5, 7
	KTM	602	(Sweden) Felix Boberg	1–2
CanaryFactory	Yamaha	646	(Spain) José Maria Hernández	3–4, 7
Beta Trueba MX Racing Team	Beta	666	(Spain) Alejo Peral	1–2, 4

=== Riders Championship ===
Points are awarded to the top-five finishers of the qualifying race, in the following format:

Position	1st	2nd	3rd	4th	5th
Points	5	4	3	2	1

Points are awarded to finishers of the main races, in the following format:

Position	1st	2nd	3rd	4th	5th	6th	7th	8th	9th	10th	11th	12th	13th	14th	15th	16th	17th	18th	19th	20th
Points	25	22	20	18	16	15	14	13	12	11	10	9	8	7	6	5	4	3	2	1

Pos	Rider	Bike	CAL (Aragon)		MAL (Extremadura)		ALH (Region of Murcia)		MON (Castilla–La Mancha)		MAR (Aragon)		MDF (Andalusia)		TAL (Castilla–La Mancha)		Points
1	(Spain) Adrià Monné	Gas Gas	3^{+3}	2	1^{+5}	1	2^{+3}	2	2^{+4}	2	5^{+2}	5	6^{+5}	1	2	3	316
2	(Spain) Salvador Pérez	Yamaha	5	7	8^{+2}	6	19^{+4}	4	4	4	4^{+4}	2	2^{+4}	5	1	1	256
3	(Spain) Gilen Albisua	Gas Gas	8	10	4	9	5	5	7^{+1}	5	10	DNS	4	4	4	4	200
4	(Spain) Bruno Miró	Gas Gas			7	10	4	6	3	7	1^{+3}	1	3^{+1}	2	Ret	DNS	188
5	(Brazil) Bernardo Tibúrcio	Yamaha	4	4	3	3	1^{+5}	1	1^{+2}	1							183
6	(Spain) Pablo Lara	Gas Gas	11	16	10^{+1}	5	8	8	12	10	8^{+1}	6	9^{+3}	6	5	5	180
7	(Spain) David Braceras	Triumph	6	5	2^{+4}	2	3^{+2}	3	5^{+5}	3							162
8	(Spain) Ivan Polvillo	Yamaha	10	13	11	8	10	9	Ret	11	9	8	10	13	7	7	147
9	(Spain) Carlos Prat	Triumph	7	15	Ret	14	DNS	7	8^{+3}	6	6	17	8	10	6	6	145
10	(Spain) Elias Escandell	Triumph									2^{+5}	3	7	12	3	2	112
11	(Spain) Valentino Vázquez	Gas Gas	12	17	5	4	6	12	9	20					19	8	99
12	(Chile) César Paine	Gas Gas									3	4	5	3	10	DNS	85
13	(Spain) Samuel Tapia	Gas Gas			Ret	18			Ret	14	7	7	1^{+2}	9	Ret	DNS	77
14	(Spain) Óscar Quirós	Triumph	23	24	21	21	14	16	16	17	16	11	12	7	14	14	73
15	(Spain) Manuel López	Gas Gas	Ret^{+2}	14	6	7	20^{+1}	19	6	8							70
16	(Spain) Álex Lasheras	KTM	13	Ret	Ret	15	Ret	20	11	12	12	18	14	DNS	8	18	69
17	(Spain) Alejo Peral	Beta	14	9	9^{+3}	12			10	9							66
18	(Latvia) Jānis Reišulis	Yamaha	1^{+5}	1													55
19	(Spain) Daniel Castañondo	Triumph	16	12	14	Ret	11	14	15	13							52
20	(Spain) Mauro Osinalde	Gas Gas	9	6	12	11	17	DNS									50
21	(Israel) Inbar Selinger	KTM					12	15			14	9			16	12	48
22	(Latvia) Kārlis Reišulis	Yamaha	2^{+4}	3													46
23	(Spain) Jaime Borrego	KTM			18	17							11	8	15	13	44
24	(Spain) Javier Salinas	KTM	17	11			7	11							20	DNS	39
25	(Spain) José Maria Hernández	Yamaha					18	13	14	DNS					12	9	39
26	(Spain) Francisco Galán	Triumph									19	15	13	11	Ret	11	36
27	(Spain) Izan Querol	Kawasaki							13	15					11	10	35
28	(Spain) Xavier Camps	Gas Gas	15	8	17	13											31
29	(Spain) Ángel Martínez	Beta					13	17			18	10					26
30	(Spain) Alfonso Pastor	Honda	26	Ret	DNS	DNS	15	18	17	19	17	14					26
31	(Spain) Eric Casas	KTM	DNS	DNS							15	12			17	15	25
32	(Spain) Ot Marí	Fantic					9	10	20	DNS							24
33	(Spain) Roger Ponsa	KTM	18	18							11	16					21
34	(Spain) Daniela Guillén	Gas Gas			15	DNS									9	DNS	18
35	(Spain) Alberto Villalba	Husqvarna	28	27	DNS	DNS	16	Ret	18	18					18	17	18
36	(Spain) Unai Larrañaga	Fantic									13	13					16
37	(Portugal) Gonçalo Cardoso	KTM			13	16											13
38	(Israel) Tal Ovadia	Fantic													13	19	10
39	(Spain) Aniol Molas	Husqvarna	21	21					19	16							7
40	(Sweden) Felix Boberg	KTM	22	23	16	19											7
41	(Spain) Unai Samper	KTM	19	19	19	20											7
42	(Spain) Daniel Galvez	Yamaha													Ret	16	5
43	(Ecuador) Allan Tapia	KTM			20	Ret											1
44	(Netherlands) Sven Dijk	KTM	24	20													1
45	(Spain) Biel Pons	KTM	20	22													1
46	(United Kingdom) Billy Askew	Triumph	Ret^{+1}	DNS													1
	(Spain) Natalia Rosado	Honda			22	Ret											0
	(Spain) Víctor Beltrán	Husqvarna			DNS	22											0
	(Spain) Antonio Galiano	Husqvarna			24	23			DNS	DNS							0
	(Spain) Mario Martín-Laliena	Yamaha	27	26	23	Ret											0
	(Spain) Francisco José Jimenez	Honda			25	24											0
	(Spain) Bítor Quintin	Triumph	25	25													0
	(Spain) Denis Canto	Gas Gas	Ret	Ret	Ret	DNS											0
	(Spain) Roberto Rodríguez	KTM	Ret	DNS													0
	(Spain) Samuel Panzano	KTM	Ret	DNS													0
	(Spain) Sergio Borrallo	Yamaha											DNS	DNS			0
	(France) Félix Cardineau	Triumph			DNS	DNS											0
Pos	Rider	Bike	CAL (Aragon)		MAL (Extremadura)		ALH (Region of Murcia)		MON (Castilla–La Mancha)		MAR (Aragon)		MDF (Andalusia)		TAL (Castilla–La Mancha)		Points
