= Montearagón =

Montearagón, Montaragón or Monte-Aragón ("Mount of Aragon") can refer to the following places and sites:

- Castle of Montearagón near Huesca, Aragón
- Mancha de Montearagón, a historic comarca in La Mancha region, Castilla–La Mancha
- Montearagón, Toledo, Castilla–La Mancha
- Chinchilla de Montearagón in Albacete, Castilla–La Mancha
