= 2025 Spanish Motocross Championship =

Spanish National Motocross Competition in 2025

The 2025 Spanish Motocross Championship season was the 67th Spanish Motocross Championship season.

The series had seven rounds across the country, running from February to October. José Butrón was the reigning champion in the Elite-MX1 class, after winning his tenth senior title in 2024. After a close championship battle with Ander Valentín, where Butrón entered the final round with a points deficit, he was able to successfully defend his title once more. This was Butróns eleventh senior national title and his fourth in a row in the Elite-MX1 class.

Gerard Congost was the reigning champion in the Elite-MX2 class after he won his second title in the previous season. He did not defend the title due to moving up to the Elite-MX1 class for the 2025 season. After a consistent season, Adrià Monné triumphed to take his first senior national title in the Elite-MX2 class.

Due to adverse track conditions, the Saturday programme at the opening round in Talavera de la Reina was cancelled, meaning no points for qualifying were awarded across any class.

== Race calendar and results ==
=== Elite-MX1 ===
Round	Date	Location	Pole position	Race 1 Winner	Race 2 Winner	Round Winner
1	1–2 February	(Castilla–La Mancha) Talavera de la Reina	Race Cancelled	(Spain) Ander Valentín	(Spain) Ander Valentín	(Spain) Ander Valentín
2	22–23 February	(Andalusia) Sanlúcar de Barrameda	(Spain) Rubén Fernández	(Spain) José Butrón	(Spain) José Butrón	(Spain) José Butrón
3	8–9 March	(Catalonia) Bellpuig	(Spain) Gerard Congost	(Spain) Gerard Congost	(Spain) José Butrón	(Spain) José Butrón
4	26–27 April	(Castilla–La Mancha) Montearagón	(Spain) Carlos Campano	(Spain) Carlos Campano	(Spain) José Butrón	(Spain) José Butrón
5	17–18 May	(Aragon) Calatayud	(Spain) Gerard Congost	(Spain) Gerard Congost	(Spain) Ander Valentín	(Spain) Ander Valentín
6	27–28 September	(Region of Murcia) Alhama de Murcia	(Spain) Ander Valentín	(Spain) José Butrón	(Spain) Gerard Congost	(Spain) Gerard Congost
7	18–19 October	(Extremadura) Malpartida de Cáceres	(Spain) Carlos Campano	(Spain) José Butrón	(Spain) José Butrón	(Spain) José Butrón

=== Elite-MX2 ===
Round	Date	Location	Pole position	Race 1 Winner	Race 2 Winner	Round Winner
1	1–2 February	(Castilla–La Mancha) Talavera de la Reina	Race Cancelled	(Spain) Oriol Oliver	(Spain) Oriol Oliver	(Spain) Oriol Oliver
2	22–23 February	(Andalusia) Sanlúcar de Barrameda	(Spain) Oriol Oliver	(Spain) Oriol Oliver	(Spain) Oriol Oliver	(Spain) Oriol Oliver
3	8–9 March	(Catalonia) Bellpuig	(Spain) Salvador Pérez	(Spain) Oriol Oliver	(Spain) Adrià Monné	(Spain) Oriol Oliver
4	26–27 April	(Castilla–La Mancha) Montearagón	(Spain) Oriol Oliver	(Spain) Oriol Oliver	(Spain) Oriol Oliver	(Spain) Oriol Oliver
5	17–18 May	(Aragon) Calatayud	(Spain) Oriol Oliver	(Spain) Adrià Monné	(Spain) Adrià Monné	(Spain) Adrià Monné
6	27–28 September	(Region of Murcia) Alhama de Murcia	(Spain) Oriol Oliver	(Spain) Oriol Oliver	(Spain) Adrià Monné	(Spain) Adrià Monné
7	18–19 October	(Extremadura) Malpartida de Cáceres	(Spain) Adrià Monné	(Spain) Oriol Oliver	(Spain) Oriol Oliver	(Spain) Oriol Oliver

=== Circuit locations ===
2025 Spanish Motocross Championship locations

== Elite-MX1 ==
=== Participants ===
Team	Constructor	No	Rider	Rounds
KTM Spain	KTM	4	(Spain) Gerard Congost	All
Mad Motos Team	Kawasaki	5	(Spain) Carlos Abel	All
B.R. Motos Husqvarna	Husqvarna	7	(Spain) Nil Bussot	3
	Yamaha	9	(Spain) Carlos Ferrera	2
	KTM	13	(Spain) Cristian Murillo	7
Haro MX Team	Yamaha	14	(Spain) Francisco Haro	1–5
KTM TRT Motorcycles	KTM	17	(Spain) José Butrón	All
KTM TRT Motorcycles	KTM	25	(Spain) Bruno Darias	All
Acema Motor	Kawasaki	18	(Spain) Carlos Sanz	1
Alma Racing	Honda	26	(Spain) Daniel Sáez	1
	Gas Gas	28	(Spain) Marcos Gutierrez	2, 4–5, 7
Team TMX Competition	Yamaha	31	(France) Adrien Malaval	3
	KTM	33	(Spain) Rubén Herrera	5
Fastlane Racing Team	Yamaha	47	(Denmark) Rasmus Daugaard	1
Team Castro MX	Kawasaki	51	(Spain) Sergio Castro	1, 3–6
	KTM	54	(Spain) Marc Martí	4
Motos VR Yamaha	Yamaha	56	(Portugal) Luís Outeiro	4, 7
Team Pavo & Rueda	Husqvarna	57	(Spain) Pablo de la Rosa	7
	Yamaha	60	(Sweden) Anton Nagy	2–3
JRB Offroad	KTM	64	(Spain) Roberto Otero	All
Team Honda HRC	Honda	70	(Spain) Rubén Fernández	2
Motos Aleser	Gas Gas	71	(Spain) Alejandro Navarro	2, 6–7
	Honda	78	(Spain) José Javier Corbalan	6
KTM Namura Bikes	KTM	79	(Spain) David Beltran	7
TeamX Reina	Yamaha	80	(Spain) Sergio Sánchez	4–5, 7
Husqvarna Portugal/Ride4ever	Husqvarna	81	(Portugal) Abel Carreiro	1
Motos Franmi	Yamaha	84	(Spain) Pedro José Alcazar	1, 6
Oliveira Racing Team	Yamaha	91	(Portugal) Francisco Salgueiro	4
Ausió Yamaha Racing Team	Yamaha	92	(Spain) Ander Valentín	All
KMP Honda Racing Team	Honda	96	(Spain) Victor Alonso	7
	KTM	101	(Spain) Miquel Munar	5
SMR Racing Team	KTM	111	(Spain) Lucas Bodega	1–5, 7
Yamaha E. Castro Bedetec	Yamaha	115	(Spain) Carlos Campano	1, 4, 6–7
	Honda	117	(Spain) Alejandro Gallardo	6
Team JCR Fantic	Fantic	124	(Spain) Simeó Ubach	All
Team JCR Fantic	Fantic	848	(Spain) Joan Cros	3
Nautic Performance-Pinturas Molina	Yamaha	133	(Spain) José Manuel Morillo	2
Honda Dream Racing Bells	Honda	163	(Japan) Yuki Okura	3
	Honda	169	(Spain) David Noya	3, 5
Team Motomon - Segura 80 Racing	Yamaha	180	(Spain) Joan Pau Segura	1–3
Tecnibikes	Kawasaki	192	(Spain) David Villalba	2
Acema Motor	Honda	219	(Spain) David Jimenez	All
	KTM	221	(Spain) Bartomeu Alomar	3, 5
Toldos Ankisol-HRP-DPS Motorsport	Honda	241	(Spain) Borja Mugica	6
Team Lebri	KTM	313	(Spain) Alex Romero	2–4, 6–7
OC1 Racing Team Berg Racing	Kawasaki	437	(Sweden) David Antonio Floria	1–3
Jezyk Racing Team	KTM	501	(Spain) Roger Oliver	All
	Honda	523	(Spain) Angel Petit	3
Triumph Spain	Triumph	525	(Spain) Iván Cervantes	7
Dermotor	KTM	632	(Spain) Marcos Panzano	1, 3–5
	Honda	770	(Sweden) Elias Thor	1–3
	Yamaha	996	(France) Thomas Estaque	3

=== Riders Championship ===
Points are awarded to the top-five finishers of the qualifying race, in the following format:

Position	1st	2nd	3rd	4th	5th
Points	5	4	3	2	1

Points are awarded to finishers of the main races, in the following format:

Position	1st	2nd	3rd	4th	5th	6th	7th	8th	9th	10th	11th	12th	13th	14th	15th	16th	17th	18th	19th	20th
Points	25	22	20	18	16	15	14	13	12	11	10	9	8	7	6	5	4	3	2	1

Pos	Rider	Bike	TAL (Castilla–La Mancha)		SAN (Andalusia)		BEL (Catalonia)		MON (Castilla–La Mancha)		CAL (Aragon)		ALH (Region of Murcia)		MAL (Extremadura)		Points
1	(Spain) José Butrón	KTM	3	6	1^{+4}	1	3^{+1}	1	2^{+4}	1	3^{+2}	2	1^{+4}	3	1^{+4}	1	333
2	(Spain) Ander Valentín	Yamaha	1	1	4^{+3}	2	2^{+4}	2	3^{+2}	2	2^{+3}	1	2^{+5}	2	2^{+3}	2	331
3	(Spain) Gerard Congost	KTM	2	2	3^{+2}	3	1^{+5}	3	4^{+3}	3	1^{+5}	15	3^{+3}	1	3	3	295
4	(Spain) Simeó Ubach	Fantic	5	3	5^{+1}	5	4	4	6	4	8	DNS	5^{+1}	4	7	6	215
5	(Spain) Carlos Abel	Kawasaki	6	5	8	8	14	8	10	7	7	4	9	7	12	10	180
6	(Spain) David Jimenez	Honda	7	10	12	10	11	11	15	13	6	5	13	11	14	11	145
7	(Spain) Roger Oliver	KTM	17	DNS	10	Ret	6	5	12	9	5^{+1}	14	8	8	11	9	139
8	(Spain) Carlos Campano	Yamaha	4	4					1^{+5}	18			4	14	5^{+5}	17	119
9	(Spain) Sergio Castro	Kawasaki	DNS	DNS			9	7	7^{+1}	17	4^{+4}	3	7	5			117
10	(Spain) Francisco Haro	Yamaha	8	7	7	7	8	9	9	6	17	DNS					111
11	(Spain) Lucas Bodega	KTM	14	9	11	9	Ret	15	11	8	16	7			10	12	109
12	(Spain) Roberto Otero	KTM	11	13	13	11	13	14	16	12	9	12	10	DNS	15	18	106
13	(Spain) Alejandro Navarro	Gas Gas			6	6							6^{+2}	6	6^{+1}	7	92
14	(Spain) Marcos Panzano	KTM	13	8			18	12	14	10	13	6					74
15	(Spain) Bruno Darias	KTM	12	19	DNS	DNS	Ret	DNS	20	19	10	8	11	9	13	15	74
16	(Portugal) Luís Outeiro	Yamaha							8	5					4	5	63
17	(Spain) Alex Romero	KTM			15	Ret	15	17	13	11			12	10	18	19	59
18	(Sweden) Anton Nagy	Yamaha			9	4	7	13									52
19	(Spain) Joan Pau Segura	Yamaha	9	11	16	12	17	21									40
20	(Spain) Victor Alonso	Honda													8^{+2}	4	33
21	(Japan) Yuki Okura	Honda					5	6									31
22	(Spain) Rubén Fernández	Honda			2^{+5}	Ret											27
23	(Spain) David Beltran	KTM													9	8	25
24	(Spain) David Noya	Honda					19	20			11	9					25
25	(Spain) Marcos Gutierrez	Gas Gas			20	17			19	15	DNS	DNS			17	14	24
26	(Spain) Pedro José Alcazar	Yamaha	18	16									15	12			23
27	(Spain) Nil Bussot	Husqvarna					12	10									20
28	(Portugal) Abel Carreiro	Husqvarna	10	12													20
29	(France) Adrien Malaval	Yamaha					10^{+3}	16									19
30	(Spain) Sergio Sánchez	Yamaha							5	20	DNS	DNS			20	DNS	18
31	(Spain) Miquel Munar	KTM									14	10					18
32	(Sweden) David Antonio Floria	Kawasaki	DNS	DNS	17	14	16	19									18
33	(Spain) Rubén Herrera	KTM									12	13					17
34	(Spain) Bartomeu Alomar	KTM					22	23			15	11					16
35	(Spain) Borja Mugica	Honda											14	13			15
36	(Spain) José Manuel Morillo	Yamaha			14	13											15
37	(Spain) Pablo de la Rosa	Husqvarna													16	13	13
38	(Denmark) Rasmus Daugaard	Yamaha	15	14													13
39	(Sweden) Elias Thor	Honda	19	15	21	16	Ret	22									13
40	(Spain) Marc Martí	KTM							17	14							11
41	(Spain) José Javier Corbalan	Honda											16	15			11
42	(Spain) Carlos Sanz	Kawasaki	16	17													9
43	(Spain) David Villalba	Kawasaki			19	15											8
44	(Portugal) Francisco Salgueiro	Yamaha							18	16							8
45	(Spain) Cristian Murillo	KTM													19	16	7
46	(Spain) Alejandro Gallardo	Honda											17	DNS			4
47	(France) Thomas Estaque	Yamaha					20	18									4
48	(Spain) Daniel Sáez	Honda	20	18													4
49	(Spain) Carlos Ferrera	Yamaha			18	Ret											3
50	(Spain) Joan Cros	Fantic					DNS^{+2}	Ret									2
	(Spain) Angel Petit	Honda					21	24									0
Riders ineligible for championship points
	(Spain) Iván Cervantes	Triumph													15	12	0
Pos	Rider	Bike	TAL (Castilla–La Mancha)		SAN (Andalusia)		BEL (Catalonia)		MON (Castilla–La Mancha)		CAL (Aragon)		ALH (Region of Murcia)		MAL (Extremadura)		Points

== Elite-MX2 ==
=== Participants ===
Team	Constructor	No	Rider	Rounds
Team Pavo & Rueda	KTM	6	(Spain) Elias Escandell	7
Monster Energy Triumph Racing	Triumph	8	(South Africa) Camden McLellan	1
Monster Energy Triumph Racing	Triumph	99	(Spain) Guillem Farrés	1
Team Piera	Honda	9	(Spain) Biel Piera	1, 3–5
Mequitec Gas Gas Racing Team	Gas Gas	11	(Spain) Gilen Albisua	All
Mequitec Gas Gas Racing Team	Gas Gas	128	(Spain) Jana Sánchez	3
Mequitec Gas Gas Racing Team	Gas Gas	255	(Spain) Daniela Guillén	1–5
Mequitec Gas Gas Racing Team	Gas Gas	300	(Spain) Salvador Pérez	All
Mequitec Gas Gas Racing Team	Gas Gas	777	(Mexico) Sebastián González	4
Motos Aleser	Husqvarna	12	(Spain) Victor Beltran	1–2
Motos Aleser	Husqvarna	19	(Spain) Antonio Galiano	2, 4, 6
KTM TRT Motorcycles	KTM	16	(Venezuela) Ilan Ventura	1–2
KTM TRT Motorcycles	KTM	95	(Spain) Jesael Fleitas	1–2, 4–5
KTM TRT Motorcycles	KTM	212	(Spain) Jaime Borrego	1–2
Acema Motor	Honda	18	(Spain) Francisco José Jimenez	1–2, 4–5, 7
Moto Racing Canet	Kawasaki	25	(Spain) Marti Bañeres	1, 3
	KTM	26	(Spain) David Pociello	7
Maños Racing	Yamaha	37	(Spain) Hugo Alarcon	2
KTM Spain	KTM	51	(Spain) Oriol Oliver	All
Ausió Yamaha Racing Team	Yamaha	68	(Spain) Unai Larrañaga	1–5
Ausió Yamaha Racing Team	Yamaha	217	(Spain) Ivan Polvillo	All
	Honda	73	(Spain) Matvei Lankin	6
KMP Honda Racing Team	Honda	82	(Spain) Manuel López	1, 6–7
Triumph Bilbao - Mutecsa	Triumph	86	(Spain) Daniel Castañondo	All
Hone Riders	Triumph	90	(Spain) Biel Pons	3
Triumph Jezyk Racing Team	Triumph	96	(Spain) Mauro Osinalde	All
Triumph Jezyk Racing Team	Triumph	239	(Spain) Yonay Morales	1–5
Triumph Jezyk Racing Team	Triumph	351	(Spain) Carlos Prat	All
Triumph Jezyk Racing Team	Triumph	368	(Spain) Samuel Nilsson	1–6
Domeño Off Road	KTM	101	(Spain) Alfonso Pastor	1–3, 5–7
CMC Racing Team	KTM	122	(Spain) Valentino Vazquez	1, 5
Trenado Racing	Honda	122	(Spain) Valentino Vazquez	7
	Gas Gas	125	(Spain) Alex Marin	1, 3
	KTM	191	(Spain) Joel Navarro	5–6
ETG Racing - Sitges	Gas Gas	199	(Spain) Unai Samper	1–6
ETG	KTM	204	(Spain) Roger Ponsa	1, 3, 6
DPS Motorsport	KTM	207	(Spain) Aleix Marti	3
Yamaha E. Castro	Yamaha	218	(Spain) Marino Villar	All
	Yamaha	222	(Spain) Joel Zamorano	1
	KTM	238	(Spain) Francisco Ángel Galán	7
Tip Trans Group	Husqvarna	247	(South Africa) Jean Visser	1–5
Mad Motos Team	KTM	272	(Spain) Alberto Villalba	1–2, 4–7
Kid MX Team	KTM	303	(Spain) Ot Mari	7
Motos VR Yamaha	Yamaha	311	(Portugal) Sandro Lobo	4
	KTM	324	(Spain) Samuel Rodríguez	7
Motocrosscenter	Husqvarna	337	(Spain) Bruno Miro	1, 3, 6–7
	Triumph	357	(Spain) Bitor Quintin	1, 5
	Gas Gas	362	(Spain) Marco Alonso	All
Gas Gas TRT Motorcycles	Gas Gas	365	(Spain) Adrià Monné	All
Lleides JMC	Gas Gas	370	(Spain) Xavier Camps	1, 3, 5
Dermotor	KTM	425	(Spain) Samuel Panzano	1, 3, 5
	KTM	494	(France) Ruben Gestas	1, 3
	KTM	501	(Spain) Borja Caballero	All
Team Bridas	Triumph	511	(Spain) Hugo Ojeda	1, 7
	Gas Gas	512	(Belgium) Uwe De Waele	3
	KTM	561	(Spain) Elio Lorente	1
Moto Oviedo	Kawasaki	666	(Spain) Alejo Peral	1
Bud Racing	KTM	710	(Spain) Alejandro Martin	1–3, 5

=== Riders Championship ===
Points are awarded to the top-five finishers of the qualifying race, in the following format:

Position	1st	2nd	3rd	4th	5th
Points	5	4	3	2	1

Points are awarded to finishers of the main races, in the following format:

Position	1st	2nd	3rd	4th	5th	6th	7th	8th	9th	10th	11th	12th	13th	14th	15th	16th	17th	18th	19th	20th
Points	25	22	20	18	16	15	14	13	12	11	10	9	8	7	6	5	4	3	2	1

Pos	Rider	Bike	TAL (Castilla–La Mancha)		SAN (Andalusia)		BEL (Catalonia)		MON (Castilla–La Mancha)		CAL (Aragon)		ALH (Region of Murcia)		MAL (Extremadura)		Points
1	(Spain) Adrià Monné	Gas Gas	5	4	2^{+4}	3	3^{+2}	1	3^{+2}	2	1^{+4}	1	3^{+3}	1	3^{+5}	5	314
2	(Spain) Oriol Oliver	KTM	1	1	1^{+5}	1	1^{+4}	2	1^{+5}	1	DNS^{+5}	DNS	1^{+5}	11	1^{+3}	1	309
3	(Spain) Salvador Pérez	Gas Gas	7	6	3^{+3}	4	4^{+5}	6	4^{+4}	4	2^{+3}	2	2^{+4}	4	6	4	272
4	(Spain) Samuel Nilsson	Triumph	4	3	4	2	2^{+3}	4	2^{+3}	3	3^{+2}	3	DNS	DNS			208
5	(Spain) Gilen Albisua	Gas Gas	9	8	7^{+2}	6	7	7	6	6	6	5	4^{+1}	3	5^{+1}	14	208
6	(Spain) Carlos Prat	Triumph	6	7	5^{+1}	5	6^{+1}	3	5^{+1}	5	4	4	6	DNS	8	10	206
7	(Spain) Daniel Castañondo	Triumph	12	17	11	11	13	12	7	7	11	7	12	15	16	15	128
8	(Spain) Ivan Polvillo	Yamaha	21	23	12	10	Ret	11	8	9	7	Ret	7	6	10	8	122
9	(Spain) Marino Villar	Yamaha	16	16	9	9	16	10	12	Ret	10	10	11	9	17	12	116
10	(Spain) Unai Larrañaga	Yamaha	10	10	8	8	8	13	10	12	9	8					114
11	(Spain) Mauro Osinalde	Triumph	17	12	DNS	DNS	Ret	16	11	13	8	9	5	7	11	11	111
12	(Spain) Daniela Guillén	Gas Gas	23	15	6	7	11	14	9	8	12	11					96
13	(Spain) Marco Alonso	Gas Gas	11	13	10	Ret	15	18	16	14	Ret	12	9	8	14	16	96
14	(Spain) Borja Caballero	KTM	13	19	16	13	12	15	14	16	14	Ret	10	10	12	13	96
15	(Spain) Bruno Miro	Husqvarna	Ret	32			5	5					8	5	9	6	88
16	(Spain) Manuel López	Honda	8	Ret									19^{+2}	2	4^{+4}	3	81
17	(Spain) Samuel Panzano	KTM	14	9			9	8			Ret	6					59
18	(South Africa) Jean Visser	Husqvarna	20	18	13	16	10	23	17	17	16	13					49
19	(Spain) Elias Escandell	KTM													2^{+2}	2	46
20	(Spain) Guillem Farrés	Triumph	2	2													44
21	(Spain) Xavier Camps	Gas Gas	18	11			Ret	9			5^{+1}	20					43
22	(Spain) Unai Samper	Gas Gas	24	29	14	12	Ret	20	20	15	13	Ret	15	16			43
23	(South Africa) Camden McLellan	Triumph	3	5													36
24	(Spain) Biel Piera	Honda	Ret	30			14	17	18	18	15	14					30
25	(Spain) Alfonso Pastor	KTM	Ret	DNS	24	20	21	27			17	15	13	13	20	20	29
26	(Spain) Valentino Vazquez	KTM	Ret	26							DNS	DNS					28
26	(Spain) Valentino Vazquez	Honda													7	7	28
27	(Spain) Ot Mari	KTM													13	9	20
28	(Spain) Roger Ponsa	KTM	19	20			17	24					17	12			20
29	(Mexico) Sebastián González	Gas Gas							13	11							18
30	(Portugal) Sandro Lobo	Yamaha							15	10							17
31	(Spain) Matvei Lankin	Honda											14	14			14
32	(Spain) Alberto Villalba	KTM	34	36	25	24			23	21	22	19	16	17	21	18	14
33	(Spain) Jaime Borrego	KTM	27	22	15	14											13
34	(Spain) Alejo Peral	Kawasaki	15	14													13
35	(Spain) Victor Beltran	Husqvarna	28	24	17	15											10
36	(Spain) Yonay Morales	Triumph	DNS	DNS	19	18	20	25	19	19	Ret	DNS					10
37	(Spain) Alejandro Martin	KTM	32	34	20	19	Ret	26			20	16					9
38	(Spain) David Pociello	KTM													18	17	7
39	(Spain) Bitor Quintin	Triumph	29	31							18	17					7
40	(Venezuela) Ilan Ventura	KTM	30	28	18	17											7
41	(Spain) Francisco Ángel Galán	KTM													15	Ret	6
42	(Spain) Antonio Galiano	Husqvarna			21	22			22	20			18	DNS			4
43	(Spain) Samuel Rodríguez	KTM													19	19	4
44	(Spain) Aleix Marti	KTM					19	19									4
45	(Spain) Jesael Fleitas	KTM	Ret	35	22	23			21	22	21	18					3
46	(Spain) Marti Bañeres	Kawasaki	22	21			18	21									3
47	(Spain) Joel Navarro	KTM									19	Ret	DNS	DNS			2
	(Spain) Francisco José Jimenez	Honda	DNS	DNS	26	25			Ret	Ret	Ret	Ret			22	21	0
	(Spain) Hugo Alarcon	Yamaha			23	21											0
	(Spain) Biel Pons	Triumph					22	22									0
	(France) Ruben Gestas	KTM	25	25			DNS	DNS									0
	(Spain) Elio Lorente	KTM	26	27													0
	(Spain) Alex Marin	Gas Gas	31	33													0
	(Spain) Hugo Ojeda	Triumph	33	37											DNS	DNS	0
	(Spain) Joel Zamorano	Triumph	Ret	Ret													0
	(Spain) Jana Sánchez	Gas Gas					Ret	Ret									0
	(Belgium) Uwe De Waele	Gas Gas					Ret	DNS									0
	(Spain) Alex Marin	Gas Gas					DNS	DNS									0
Pos	Rider	Bike	TAL (Castilla–La Mancha)		SAN (Andalusia)		BEL (Catalonia)		MON (Castilla–La Mancha)		CAL (Aragon)		ALH (Region of Murcia)		MAL (Extremadura)		Points
