= 2024 Spanish Motocross Championship =

Spanish National Motocross Competition in 2024

The 2024 Spanish Motocross Championship season was the 66th Spanish Motocross Championship season.

The series had seven rounds across the country, running from February to October. José Butrón was the reigning champion in the Elite-MX1, after winning his ninth title in 2023. After taking four overall wins throughout the season, Butrón successfully managed to defend his title.

Gerard Congost was the reigning champion in the Elite-MX2 class after he won his first title in the previous season. Congost proved to be the most consistent rider throughout the season, winning the final round and successfully defending the title.

The opening round of the series in Talavera de la Reina saw the competitive international debut of Triumph's 250cc motocross bike in the Elite-MX2 class.

Adverse weather conditions at the second round in Lugo meant that the entire programme was completed on Saturday rather than being spread across both days.

== Race calendar and results ==
The full calendar with both dates and venues was released on 12 December.

=== Elite-MX1 ===
Round	Date	Location	Pole position	Race 1 Winner	Race 2 Winner	Round Winner
1	3–4 February	(Castilla–La Mancha) Talavera de la Reina	(Italy) Mattia Guadagnini	(United Kingdom) Josh Gilbert	(Italy) Mattia Guadagnini	(United Kingdom) Josh Gilbert
2	24–25 February	(Galicia (Spain)) Lugo	(Spain) Jorge Prado	(Spain) Rubén Fernández	(Spain) Jorge Prado	(Spain) Jorge Prado
3	16–17 March	(Extremadura) Malpartida de Cáceres	(Spain) José Butrón	(Spain) José Butrón	(Spain) José Butrón	(Spain) José Butrón
4	20–21 April	(Andalusia) Sanlúcar de Barrameda	(Spain) José Butrón	(Spain) José Butrón	(Spain) José Butrón	(Spain) José Butrón
5	25–26 May	(Region of Murcia) Alhama de Murcia	(Spain) José Butrón	(Spain) José Butrón	(Spain) José Butrón	(Spain) José Butrón
6	19–20 October	(Catalonia) Bellpuig	(Spain) Carlos Campano	(Spain) Ander Valentín	(Spain) José Butrón	(Spain) José Butrón
7	26–27 October	(Aragon) Calatayud	(Spain) Rubén Fernández	(Spain) Rubén Fernández	(Spain) Rubén Fernández	(Spain) Rubén Fernández

=== Elite-MX2 ===
Round	Date	Location	Pole position	Race 1 Winner	Race 2 Winner	Round Winner
1	3–4 February	(Castilla–La Mancha) Talavera de la Reina	(Denmark) Mikkel Haarup	(Belgium) Lucas Coenen	(Belgium) Lucas Coenen	(Belgium) Lucas Coenen
2	24–25 February	(Galicia (Spain)) Lugo	(Italy) Ferruccio Zanchi	(France) Marc-Antoine Rossi	(France) Marc-Antoine Rossi	(France) Marc-Antoine Rossi
3	16–17 March	(Extremadura) Malpartida de Cáceres	(Spain) David Braceras	(Spain) David Braceras	(Spain) David Braceras	(Spain) David Braceras
4	20–21 April	(Andalusia) Sanlúcar de Barrameda	(Spain) David Braceras	(Spain) Gerard Congost	(Spain) Samuel Nilsson	(Spain) Samuel Nilsson
5	25–26 May	(Region of Murcia) Alhama de Murcia	(Spain) Francisco García	(Spain) Francisco García	(Spain) David Braceras	(Spain) Francisco García
6	19–20 October	(Catalonia) Bellpuig	(Spain) Adriá Monné	(Spain) Samuel Nilsson	(Spain) Samuel Nilsson	(Spain) Samuel Nilsson
7	26–27 October	(Aragon) Calatayud	(Spain) Adriá Monné	(Spain) Adriá Monné	(Spain) Gerard Congost	(Spain) Gerard Congost

=== Circuit locations ===
2024 Spanish Motocross Championship locations

== Elite-MX1 ==
=== Participants ===
Team	Constructor	No	Rider	Rounds
Mad Motos Team	Kawasaki	5	(Spain) Carlos Abel	1, 4–7
Mad Motos Team	Kawasaki	80	(Spain) Sergio Sánchez	1–3
B.R. Motos Husqvarna	Husqvarna	7	(Spain) Nil Bussot	1, 3, 5
Extremadura Team	KTM	9	(Spain) Carlos Ferrera	1, 3–4
Nestaan Husqvarna Factory Racing	Husqvarna	10	(Italy) Mattia Guadagnini	1
KTM Spain Motos Aleser	KTM	11	(Spain) Alejandro Navarro	1–2, 4
Butrón Motosport	KTM	13	(Venezuela) Raimundo Trasolini	4
Yamaha E. Castro	Yamaha	14	(Spain) Francisco Haro	All
Hard Work Bikes	KTM	15	(Spain) Angel Perales	6–7
KTM TRT Motorcycle	KTM	17	(Spain) José Butrón	All
KTM TRT Motorcycle	KTM	25	(Spain) Bruno Darias	1, 4–7
KTM TRT Motorcycle	KTM	85	(Spain) Jonathan Marquez	4
Yamaha Monster Energy Geração	Yamaha	18	(Brazil) Gabriel Andrigo	1–2
Yamaha Monster Energy Geração	Yamaha	38	(Brazil) Fábio Santos	1–2, 6–7
Ausió Yamaha Racing Team	Yamaha	19	(Spain) Nil Arcarons	All
Ausió Yamaha Racing Team	Yamaha	46	(Spain) Nil Pons	6
Ausió Yamaha Racing Team	Yamaha	92	(Spain) Ander Valentín	All
Valentin Racing Construmaex	KTM	21	(Spain) Juan Prieto	3
Team Bernardez	Honda	29	(Spain) Aaron Bernardez	2
JB Racing Team	Gas Gas	31	(France) Brice Maylin	1
UTR Racing	KTM	32	(Spain) Joel Medrano	6–7
Team Motocebri	Honda	35	(Spain) Pablo Cebrian	1, 3
Team Motocebri	Honda	94	(Spain) Alvaro Cebrian	1, 3
Motos VR Yamaha Racing Team	Yamaha	41	(Portugal) Luís Outeiro	3
PerfectBikes	KTM	44	(Spain) Víctor Bartolomé	1
Fastlane Racing Team	Yamaha	47	(Denmark) Rasmus Daugaard	2–3
Team Castro MX	Kawasaki	51	(Spain) Sergio Castro	All
	KTM	54	(Spain) Marc Marti	7
Team JCR	Yamaha	57	(Spain) Pablo de la Rosa	3–4
Team JCR	Kawasaki	124	(Spain) Simeó Ubach	All
Team JCR	Kawasaki	225	(Spain) Marc Fontanals	1
Red Bull Gas Gas Factory Racing	Gas Gas	61	(Spain) Jorge Prado	2
JRB Offroad	KTM	64	(Spain) Roberto Otero	All
Team HRC	Honda	70	(Spain) Rubén Fernández	2, 7
Txarandaka - UTR Racing	Gas Gas	71	(Spain) Iker Uterga	1–2, 6–7
	KTM	78	(Spain) José Javier Corbalán	1, 5–6
Muriel Racing Team	KTM	89	(Spain) Javier Barriga	4
Team Salgueiro	Yamaha	91	(Portugal) Francisco Salgueiro	1–3, 7
Petrogold Racing Team	Gas Gas	95	(Spain) Mario Moreno	1–4, 7
Bud Racing España	Husqvarna	96	(Spain) Alejandro Serrano	1
Motos Arribas	Husqvarna	101	(Spain) Xurxo Prol	1, 3–5
SMR Racing	Gas Gas	111	(Spain) Lucas Bodega	All
Yamaha E.Castro Bedetec	Yamaha	115	(Spain) Carlos Campano	1–2, 5–7
Secomoto	Gas Gas	118	(Spain) Carlos Sanz	1
	Kawasaki	131	(Spain) José Ángel Valdes	2
	Honda	169	(Spain) David Noya	5–7
Tecnibikes	Kawasaki	192	(Spain) David Villalba	4
	KTM	199	(Spain) Jorge Gaspar Juan	1
Yamaha Speedcity	Yamaha	211	(Portugal) Paulo Alberto	2
	KTM	219	(Spain) David Jimenez	1–2, 6–7
Motos Miguel - Alpha Spirit	Honda	241	(Spain) Borja Mugica	5
Otañes School	Kawasaki	270	(Spain) David Gomez	All
Team Lebri	KTM	313	(Spain) Alex Romero	1–5
	Husqvarna	318	(Spain) Gustavo Jaramillo	2, 6
Gabriel SS24 KTM	KTM	326	(United Kingdom) Josh Gilbert	1
KTM Spain	KTM	373	(Spain) Edgar Canet	1
OC1 Racing Team Berg Racing	Kawasaki	437	(Sweden) David Antonio Floria	3
Jezyk Racing Team	KTM	501	(Spain) Roger Oliver	All
	KTM	628	(Spain) Alfredo Lancha	1
	Gas Gas	728	(Spain) Marcos Gutiérrez	7
CYR A.Martinez/Yesos Bemar	Yamaha	851	(Spain) Antonio Benzal	4–5
	Husqvarna	929	(Spain) Jonathan Gimenez	1, 3

=== Riders Championship ===
Points are awarded to the top-five finishers of the qualifying race, in the following format:

Position	1st	2nd	3rd	4th	5th
Points	5	4	3	2	1

Points are awarded to finishers of the main races, in the following format:

Position	1st	2nd	3rd	4th	5th	6th	7th	8th	9th	10th	11th	12th	13th	14th	15th	16th	17th	18th	19th	20th
Points	25	22	20	18	16	15	14	13	12	11	10	9	8	7	6	5	4	3	2	1

Pos	Rider	Bike	TAL (Castilla–La Mancha)		LUG (Galicia (Spain))		MAL (Extremadura)		SAN (Andalusia)		ALH (Region of Murcia)		BEL (Catalonia)		CAL (Aragon)		Points
1	(Spain) José Butrón	KTM	2^{+4}	3	4	4	1^{+5}	1	1^{+5}	1	1^{+5}	1	2	1	4^{+4}	2	338
2	(Spain) Ander Valentín	Yamaha	6^{+2}	4	3	3	2^{+4}	2	3^{+4}	2	2^{+2}	2	1^{+4}	3	3^{+3}	3	307
3	(Spain) Carlos Campano	Yamaha	3	5	5	5					4^{+4}	3	3^{+5}	2	2^{+2}	6	196
4	(Spain) Simeó Ubach	Kawasaki	8	11	15	10	3^{+1}	3	13^{+2}	4	17^{+1}	7	6^{+2}	6	6	4	193
5	(Spain) Roger Oliver	KTM	13	8	11	6	4	4	8	Ret	3	6	8^{+1}	8	7^{+1}	5	188
6	(Spain) Sergio Castro	Kawasaki	9	10	7	8	6	9	5	8	8	10	5	7	9	7	186
7	(Spain) Nil Arcarons	Yamaha	Ret	9	12	11	5	5	4^{+3}	7	14	5	4	5	8	12	177
8	(Spain) Francisco Haro	Yamaha	11	13	10	15	DNS	DNS	7^{+1}	5	7	8	7	4	Ret	DNS	125
9	(Spain) Lucas Bodega	Gas Gas	17	18	14	13	11	10	12	10	11	14	13	14	13	11	113
10	(Spain) Rubén Fernández	Honda			1	2									1^{+5}	1	102
11	(Spain) Carlos Abel	Kawasaki	24	20					9	9	5	12	9	10	11	9	95
12	(Spain) Xurxo Prol	Husqvarna	5	Ret			Ret^{+3}	Ret	2	3	19^{+3}	4					84
13	(Brazil) Fábio Santos	Yamaha	Ret	12	6	7							19^{+3}	9	5	8	84
14	(Spain) Mario Moreno	Gas Gas	18	17	13	14	9	8	10	11					14	DNS	75
15	(Spain) Roberto Otero	KTM	27	22	21	18	12	13	11	12	10	11	Ret	13	17	DNS	72
16	(Spain) Alejandro Navarro	KTM	14	14	8	9			6	6							69
17	(Spain) Nil Bussot	Husqvarna	15	15			8^{+2}	6			6	9					69
18	(Spain) Alex Romero	KTM	20	21	17	19	10	11	17	13	9	13					60
19	(Spain) David Gomez	Kawasaki	26	23	18	17	18	17	16	16	13	15	14	16	18	15	59
20	(Spain) David Jimenez	KTM	Ret	16	Ret	12							11	12	10	10	55
21	(United Kingdom) Josh Gilbert	KTM	1^{+3}	2													50
22	(Italy) Mattia Guadagnini	Husqvarna	4^{+5}	1													48
23	(Spain) Jorge Prado	Gas Gas			2	1											47
24	(Spain) Bruno Darias	KTM	25	Ret					15	Ret	12	16	12	15	Ret	DNS	35
25	(France) Brice Maylin	Gas Gas	7^{+1}	7													29
26	(Portugal) Luís Outeiro	Yamaha					7	7									28
27	(Spain) Angel Perales	KTM											10	11	15	DNS	27
28	(Spain) Edgar Canet	KTM	10	6													26
29	(Spain) David Noya	Honda									18	17	15	17	19	17	23
30	(Brazil) Gabriel Andrigo	Yamaha	12	Ret	9	Ret											21
31	(Spain) Carlos Ferrera	KTM	21	26			14	15	20	17							18
32	(Denmark) Rasumus Daugaard	Yamaha			19	16	17	14									18
33	(Spain) Marc Marti	KTM													12	14	16
34	(Spain) Pablo de la Rosa	Yamaha					13	16	21	18							16
35	(Portugal) Francisco Salgueiro	Yamaha	22	25	20	22	15	18							20	16	16
36	(Sweden) David Antonio Floria	Kawasaki					16	12									14
37	(Spain) Marcos Gutiérrez	Gas Gas													16	13	13
38	(Spain) José Javier Corbalán	KTM	32	31							16	18	18	21			11
39	(Spain) David Villalba	Kawasaki							18	14							10
40	(Spain) Iker Uterga	Gas Gas	23	29	DSQ	20							16	18	Ret	DNS	9
41	(Venezuela) Raimundo Trasolini	KTM							14	20							8
42	(Spain) Borja Mugica	Honda									15	19					8
43	(Spain) Jonathan Marquez	KTM							19	15							8
44	(Spain) Joel Medrano	KTM											17	19	21	DNS	6
45	(Spain) Aaron Bernardez	Honda			16	21											5
46	(Spain) Sergio Sánchez	Kawasaki	16	Ret	Ret	DNS	Ret	DNS									5
47	(Spain) Juan Prieto	KTM					19	19									4
48	(Spain) Víctor Bartolomé	KTM	19	19													4
49	(Spain) Javier Barriga	KTM							22	19							2
50	(Spain) Nil Pons	Yamaha											20	20			2
51	(Spain) Alvaro Cebrian	Honda	31	28			20	20									2
	(Spain) Jonathan Gimenez	Husqvarna	33	32			21	21									0
	(Spain) José Ángel Valdes	Kawasaki			22	Ret											0
	(Spain) Alejandro Serrano	Husqvarna	29	24													0
	(Spain) Carlos Sanz	Gas Gas	28	27													0
	(Spain) Pablo Cebrian	Honda	30	30			Ret	Ret									0
	(Spain) Jorge Gaspar Juan	KTM	34	Ret													0
	(Portugal) Paulo Alberto	Yamaha			Ret	Ret											0
	(Spain) Gustavo Jaramillo	Husqvarna			DNS	DNS							Ret	DNS			0
	(Spain) Marc Fontanals	Kawasaki	Ret	DNS													0
	(Spain) Antonio Benzal	Yamaha							DNS	DNS	DNS	DNS					0
	(Spain) Alfredo Lancha	KTM	DNS	DNS													0
Pos	Rider	Bike	TAL (Castilla–La Mancha)		LUG (Galicia (Spain))		MAL (Extremadura)		SAN (Andalusia)		ALH (Region of Murcia)		BEL (Catalonia)		CAL (Aragon)		Points

== Elite-MX2 ==
=== Participants ===
Team	Constructor	No	Rider	Rounds
Gas Gas Spain	Gas Gas	1	(Spain) Gerard Congost	All
Motos Arribas	Husqvarna	5	(Spain) Daniel Rodríguez	1–2
Mequitec Gas Gas Racing Team	Gas Gas	6	(Spain) Elias Escandell	All
Mequitec Gas Gas Racing Team	Gas Gas	29	(Spain) Francisco García	1, 3–5
Monster Energy Triumph Racing	Triumph	8	(South Africa) Camden McLellan	1
Monster Energy Triumph Racing	Triumph	17	(Denmark) Mikkel Haarup	1
Team Piera	Honda	9	(Spain) Biel Piera	1, 6–7
KTM TRT Motorcycle	KTM	11	(Spain) Gilen Albisua	All
KTM TRT Motorcycle	KTM	16	(Venezuela) Ilan Ventura	6–7
KTM TRT Motorcycle	KTM	126	(Venezuela) Cesar Aponte	6
KTM TRT Motorcycle	KTM	365	(Spain) Adriá Monné	All
KTM TRT Motorcycle	KTM	710	(Spain) Alejandro Martin	1–5
	KTM	12	(Spain) Hugo Leno	3
	Gas Gas	14	(Spain) Saul Alvarez	2
Fanatic Motos	KTM	21	(Spain) Aitor Aguiar	3
Grupo Paricio Fantic Racing	Fantic	22	(Spain) David Braceras	3–5
Moto Racing Canet	Husqvarna	25	(Spain) Marti Bañeres	1, 3–7
Pajareros	KTM	26	(Spain) Pau Salas	1, 3, 5–6
	KTM	27	(Spain) David Martínez	3
Red Bull Gas Gas Factory Racing	Gas Gas	28	(France) Marc-Antoine Rossi	2
Boutaca Racing Team	KTM	28	(Portugal) Pedro Rino	3–4
JLC Racing Team	Gas Gas	46	(Costa Rica) Yarod Vargas	1, 3
Ausió Yamaha Racing Team	Yamaha	68	(Spain) Unai Larrañaga	2–7
Ausió Yamaha Racing Team	Yamaha	128	(Spain) Jana Sánchez	5
Ausió Yamaha Racing Team	Yamaha	217	(Spain) Ivan Polvillo	6
	Husqvarna	71	(Spain) Berta Garciablanco	2
Team HRC	Honda	73	(Italy) Ferruccio Zanchi	2
	Kawasaki	75	(Spain) Carlos Ruiz	1
	Husqvarna	79	(Spain) Antonio Galiano	4
Husqvarna Portugal	Husqvarna	81	(Portugal) Abel Carreiro	3
MJR Racing Team	Gas Gas	83	(Spain) Enzo Badenas	6
Team Motos J&J	Gas Gas	90	(Spain) Biel Pons	6
Racetech	KTM	101	(Spain) Alfonso Pastor	1–3, 5–7
Yamaha Monster Energy Geração	Yamaha	109	(Brazil) Guilherme Bresolin	1–2
	KTM	110	(Estonia) Richard Paat	1
	Husqvarna	114	(Spain) Aniol Molas	1, 5
Team Castro MX	Kawasaki	123	(Spain) Nikola Chifchiev	1–5
Team Castro MX	Kawasaki	197	(Spain) Alejandro Plana	1–3, 5–6
	Gas Gas	147	(Spain) Sergi Cobo	1
Gabriel SS24 KTM	KTM	172	(Netherlands) Cas Valk	1
Pibemoto Racing	KTM	174	(Spain) Liam Sanjuan	1
	KTM	191	(Spain) Joel Navarro	7
Nestaan Husqvarna Factory Racing	Husqvarna	196	(Belgium) Lucas Coenen	1
	KTM	201	(Spain) Roger Gallart	6
Moto Racing Canet	KTM	204	(Spain) Roger Ponsa	1, 5–7
UK Racing Team	KTM	212	(Spain) Aitana Peña	2
Yamaha E. Castro	Yamaha	214	(Spain) Alejandro Miguel	1–2
	KTM	216	(Spain) Juan José Llamas	1–5
Team Pavo & Rueda MCV	Gas Gas	227	(Spain) Pablo Gutiérrez	1–4
Team JCR	Kawasaki	232	(Spain) Unai Aguiló	1
Jezyk Racing Team	KTM	239	(Spain) Yonay Morales	3–7
Jezyk Racing Team	KTM	831	(United Kingdom) Ethan Lane	1
Jezyk Racing Team	KTM	969	(Spain) Mauro Osinalde	1–3
Last Lap	Gas Gas	255	(Spain) Daniela Guillen	2, 5
Gas Gas TRT Motorcycle	Gas Gas	259	(Spain) Denis Canto	1–2, 7
CMC Preparaciones MX	KTM	272	(Spain) Alberto Villalba	1–3, 7
Edal Carpintaria/Momento TT	Husqvarna	285	(Portugal) Alex Almeida	3
Husqvarna Spain	Husqvarna	305	(Spain) Antonio Gallego	1–2
Motos VR Yamaha	Yamaha	311	(Portugal) Sandro Lobo	3
KTM Namura Racing	KTM	315	(Spain) David Beltrán	1–5
Motocross Center	Gas Gas	337	(Spain) Bruno Miró	6
	Gas Gas	362	(Spain) Marco Alonso	2–7
KTM Spain	KTM	368	(Spain) Samuel Nilsson	All
	Gas Gas	370	(Spain) Xavier Camps	6
Difrenos	Gas Gas	382	(Spain) Manuel López	All
426 Motorsport	KTM	419	(United Kingdom) Joe Brookes	3
East MX Gas Gas	Gas Gas	422	(Finland) Kimi Koskinen	3
Dermotor	KTM	425	(Spain) Samuel Panzano	1–3, 6–7
Bike IT MTX Kawasaki	Kawasaki	441	(United Kingdom) Billy Askew	2
Bike IT MTX Kawasaki	Kawasaki	579	(United Kingdom) Bobby Bruce	2
	Kawasaki	461	(Spain) Francesc Serra	3
Frucasa Team	KTM	471	(Spain) Eric Casas	6–7
	KTM	494	(France) Ruben Gestas	1
MJR	KTM	501	(Spain) Borja Caballero	4–7
	KTM	561	(Spain) Elio Lorente	7
Otañes School	KTM	586	(Spain) Daniel Castañondo	All
Kemco Sports Promotion	KTM	601	(United Kingdom) Kelton Gwyther	6–7
Dermotor	KTM	632	(Spain) Marcos Panzano	3, 6–7
Reveymo	Husqvarna	666	(Spain) Alejo Peral	1–2

=== Riders Championship ===
Points are awarded to the top-five finishers of the qualifying race, in the following format:

Position	1st	2nd	3rd	4th	5th
Points	5	4	3	2	1

Points are awarded to finishers of the main races, in the following format:

Position	1st	2nd	3rd	4th	5th	6th	7th	8th	9th	10th	11th	12th	13th	14th	15th	16th	17th	18th	19th	20th
Points	25	22	20	18	16	15	14	13	12	11	10	9	8	7	6	5	4	3	2	1

Pos	Rider	Bike	TAL (Castilla–La Mancha)		LUG (Galicia (Spain))		MAL (Extremadura)		SAN (Andalusia)		ALH (Region of Murcia)		BEL (Catalonia)		CAL (Aragon)		Points
1	(Spain) Gerard Congost	Gas Gas	3	4	3	6	2^{+4}	3	1^{+1}	5	3^{+4}	4	3^{+4}	3	2^{+3}	1	297
2	(Spain) Adriá Monné	KTM	10	7	11	3	10^{+2}	4	3^{+2}	3	4^{+3}	3	2^{+5}	2	1^{+5}	2	270
3	(Spain) Elias Escandell	Gas Gas	6^{+2}	10	5	7	3	2	2	4	2^{+1}	5	4	Ret	3^{+2}	3	239
4	(Spain) Samuel Nilsson	KTM	5^{+3}	5	2	2	4^{+1}	Ret	4^{+3}	1	12	DNS	1^{+3}	1	4^{+4}	19	230
5	(Spain) Manuel López	Gas Gas	18	21	12	13	8	10	8	10	7	7	6^{+2}	4	6	7	160
6	(Spain) Gilen Albisua	KTM	17	13	7	10	13	11	7	9	8	8	9	8	10	9	155
7	(Spain) Francisco García	Gas Gas	11	9			6	7	5^{+4}	2	1^{+5}	2					145
8	(Spain) David Beltrán	KTM	8	18	9	9	5	5	6	6	6	6					132
9	(Spain) David Braceras	Fantic					1^{+5}	1	20^{+5}	7	5^{+2}	1					118
10	(Spain) Unai Larrañaga	Yamaha			13	Ret	14	15	10	11	9	9	19	9	11	8	103
11	(Spain) Samuel Panzano	KTM	21	16	16	12	22	17					7	6	8	5	81
12	(Spain) Marco Alonso	Gas Gas			21	17	15	21	11	12	11	16	11	12	15	13	77
13	(Spain) Pablo Gutiérrez	Gas Gas	14	12	15	11	11	12	9	8							76
14	(Spain) Denis Canto	Gas Gas	13	11	14	14									5^{+1}	4	67
15	(Spain) Marcos Panzano	KTM					18	16					8	5	7	6	66
16	(Spain) Borja Caballero	KTM							14	13	13	12	15	14	13	12	62
17	(Spain) Daniel Castañondo	KTM	Ret	DNS	17	18	17	13	12	20	14	11	DNS	DNS	9	Ret	58
18	(Belgium) Lucas Coenen	Husqvarna	1^{+4}	1													54
19	(France) Marc-Antoine Rossi	Gas Gas			1	1											50
20	(Denmark) Mikkel Haarup	Triumph	2^{+5}	2													49
21	(Spain) Marti Bañeres	Husqvarna	30	30			24	22	19	18	16	13	14	16	14	16	42
22	(South Africa) Camden McLellan	Triumph	4^{+1}	3													39
23	(Italy) Ferruccio Zanchi	Honda			4	4											36
24	(Spain) Biel Piera	Honda	24	29									16	10	12	10	36
25	(Spain) Antonio Gallego	Husqvarna	9	17	6	Ret											31
26	(United Kingdom) Joe Brookes	KTM					7	6									29
27	(Netherlands) Cas Valk	KTM	7	6													29
28	(Spain) Daniela Guillen	Gas Gas			19	16					10	10					29
29	(Finland) Kimi Koskinen	Gas Gas					9^{+3}	8									28
30	(United Kingdom) Bobby Bruce	Kawasaki			10	5											27
31	(Spain) Yonay Morales	KTM					25	26	16	17	20	18	23	19	17	14	26
32	(Spain) Bruno Miró	Gas Gas											10	7			25
33	(Spain) Roger Ponsa	KTM	26	28							15	19	13	Ret	18	15	25
34	(Spain) Unai Aguiló	Kawasaki	12	8													22
35	(Portugal) Sandro Lobo	Yamaha					12	9									21
36	(Venezuela) Ilan Ventura	KTM											24	17	16	11	19
37	(Portugal) Pedro Rino	KTM					19	19	13	14							19
38	(Spain) Ivan Polvillo	Yamaha											5^{+1}	Ret			17
39	(United Kingdom) Kelton Gwyther	KTM											17	11	19	20	17
40	(Spain) Enzo Badenas	Gas Gas											12	13			17
41	(Spain) Alejandro Martin	KTM	34	35	23	Ret	29	29	18	16	19	15					16
42	(Brazil) Guilherme Bresolin	Yamaha	22	19	8	Ret											15
43	(Spain) Juan José Llamas	KTM	32	32	20	20	28	24	17	15	18	Ret					15
44	(United Kingdom) Billy Askew	Kawasaki			Ret	8											13
45	(United Kingdom) Ethan Lane	KTM	15	14													13
46	(Spain) Mauro Osinalde	KTM	20	24	Ret	DNS	16	14									13
47	(Spain) Alejo Peral	Husqvarna	Ret	20	18	15											10
48	(Spain) Nikola Chifchiev	Kawasaki	DNS	DNS	22	19	26	25	15	19	DNS	DNS					10
49	(Venezuela) Cesar Aponte	KTM											18	15			9
50	(Spain) Jana Sánchez	Yamaha									17	17					8
51	(Spain) Pau Salas	KTM	31	31			DNS	DNS			21	14	22	21			7
52	(Spain) Alejandro Miguel	Yamaha	Ret	15	Ret	DNS											6
53	(Spain) Daniel Rodríguez	Husqvarna	16	23	Ret	DNS											5
54	(Spain) Elio Lorente	KTM													Ret	17	4
55	(Spain) Joel Navarro	KTM													20	18	4
56	(Portugal) Abel Carreiro	Husqvarna					20	18									4
57	(Spain) Roger Gallart	KTM											21	18			3
58	(Estonia) Richard Paat	KTM	19	22													2
59	(Spain) Biel Pons	Gas Gas											20	20			2
60	(Spain) Alejandro Plana	Kawasaki	36	38	DSQ	22	32	33			22	20	27	24			1
61	(Portugal) Alex Almeida	Husqvarna					21	20									1
	(Spain) Alfonso Pastor	KTM	33	34	25	22	31	28			Ret	Ret	26	23	21	Ret	0
	(Spain) Saul Alvarez	Gas Gas			24	21											0
	(Spain) Eric Casas	KTM											25	22	Ret	DNS	0
	(Costa Rica) Yarod Vargas	Gas Gas	25	25			23	23									0
	(Spain) Alberto Villalba	KTM	37	37	27	23	30	31							DNS	DNS	0
	(Spain) Liam Sanjuan	KTM	23	27													0
	(Spain) Aitana Peña	KTM			26	24											0
	(Spain) Aniol Molas	Husqvarna	28	26							DNS	DNS					0
	(Spain) Aitor Aguiar	KTM					27	27									0
	(France) Ruben Gestas	KTM	27	DNS													0
	(Spain) Sergi Cobo	Gas Gas	29	33													0
	(Spain) Hugo Leno	KTM					33	30									0
	(Spain) Francesc Serra	Kawasaki					34	32									0
	(Spain) Carlos Ruiz	Kawasaki	35	36													0
	(Spain) Berta Garciablanco	Husqvarna			Ret	DNS											0
	(Spain) David Martínez	KTM					DNS	DNS									0
	(Spain) Antonio Galiano	Husqvarna							DNS	DNS							0
	(Spain) Xavier Camps	Gas Gas											DNS	DNS			0
Pos	Rider	Bike	TAL (Castilla–La Mancha)		LUG (Galicia (Spain))		MAL (Extremadura)		SAN (Andalusia)		ALH (Region of Murcia)		BEL (Catalonia)		CAL (Aragon)		Points
