= José Butrón =

Spanish motocross racer (born 1991)

- Nationality: Spanish
- Born: 27 January 1991 (age 35); Cádiz, Spain
- Current team: KTM TRT Motorcycle
- Bike number: 17

José Antonio Butrón Oliva (born 27 January 1991) is a Spanish professional motocross racer. Butrón competed in the Motocross World Championship from 2008 to 2021, finishing third in the final standings of the MX2 class in the 2013 FIM Motocross World Championship.

Butrón has represented Spain at the Motocross of Nations on ten separate occasions.

After taking a step back from full-time world championship competition after the 2021 season, Butrón won the 2022 European Motocross Championship in the EMXOpen class.

In addition to this, he is one of the most successful riders in the history of the Spanish Motocross Championship, winning twelve senior titles and six junior titles.

He became Czech Motocross Champion in 2021 and has more recently spent time riding in the AMA Motocross Championship, as well as in Venezuela, following the conclusion of his fulltime world championship career.

== Career ==
=== Junior career ===
Butrón rose through the junior categories in his native Spain, picking up several national titles. His first came in 2001 when he became champion of the 'Trofeo Alevín 65cc' class and was followed by five further titles over the next five years. He rode at the FIM Motocross Junior World Championship in 2004 and when he returned to the championship in 2005, he came away with second overall in the 85cc class.

Moving up to the 125 class in 2006, Butrón was able to become champion of the 125cc Junior class in Spain and finish seventh overall in the 125cc class of the Junior World Championship.

=== 250 career ===
By the 2008 season, Butrón was competing for the Gariboldi Racing Yamaha team in the EMX2 class in the European Motocross Championship. He started the season brightly, winning the opening round in his native Spain, but ultimately missed several rounds later in the season. In addition, he made his world championship debut in the MX2 class at the final round of the 2008 FIM Motocross World Championship. Following this, he received backing in 2009 from the Dutch Beursfoon team, initially on a KTM before switching to Suzuki, mainly competing in the MX2 class of the 2009 FIM Motocross World Championship. He made his first start of the season at the Spanish round, scoring his first world championship points in the second race. Gradually improving over the next four rounds, he would score a season's best result of tenth in the second race at the Latvian round. At the following round in Sweden, Butrón sustained a fractured fibula and was only able to return for the final two rounds.

Butrón continued with the Dutch Beursfoon team for the 2010 FIM Motocross World Championship, where he experienced a challenging campaign in the MX2 class. At the final two rounds of the season, he moved up to the MX1 class to replace the injured Kevin Strijbos. Domestically, he Butrón was able win his first senior title in the Spanish Motocross Championship by picking up the MX2 title. At the end of the season, he made his debut at the Motocross des Nations for Spain, with the team finishing thirteenth overall. The 2011 FIM Motocross World Championship season saw Butrón return to riding a KTM, this time for the Italian Silver Action team. The move saw an improvement in fortunes at World Championship level, finishing fourteenth in the final MX2 standings and recording a best finish of seventh in the final race of the season. Following this, he made his second appearance at the Motocross des Nations, helping Spain finishing in eighth position in the final standings.

Butrón moved to the Diga Racing KTM team for the 2012 FIM Motocross World Championship, a move that again saw him pick up his first world championship overall podium at the fifth round in Brazil. Butrón continued to post consistent results throughout the rest of the season, eventually finishing eighth in the final standings. In the Spanish Motocross Championship, he finished third overall in the MX Elite class after winning eight races before representing his country for the third time at the 2012 Motocross des Nations. For the 2013 FIM Motocross World Championship, Butrón returned to the Silver Action team, a move that would ultimately see him achieve his best results at World Championship level. Being a consistent feature at the front, he picked up three overall podiums across the opening six rounds, before winning the second MX2 race in Brazil and in doing so being the first rider to beat Jeffrey Herlings in 2013. After picking up three further podiums in the remainder of the season, Butrón's consistency – scoring in all but two races, saw him finish in third in the final MX2 standings. Domestically, Butrón won the Elite-MX1 class of the Spanish Motocross Championship in dominant fashion in 2013, winning all but one race across the championship's seven rounds. Following these achievements, he made his fourth appearance for Spain at the Motocross des Nations in 2013, recording the team's highest individual finish in the main races.

The 2014 FIM Motocross World Championship would be Butrón's last year in the MX2 class and despite scoring in all but two races throughout the season, he did not manage to reach the heights of the previous year, ultimately finishing ninth in the championship without any podiums or a single race top-three finish to his name. At the Spanish Championship, he was able to successfully defend his Elite-MX1 class title, this time achieving a perfect season, winning every single race across the eight round season. Once again selected for Spain at the Motocross des Nations, the team was not able to qualify for the main races, with Butrón moving up to a 450 to ride in the MXGP class and finishing second in the B-Final individually.

=== 450 career ===
Due to the under-23 age rule, Butrón had to move the MXGP class for the 2015 FIM Motocross World Championship, finding a home at the Marchetti Racing KTM Team. The transition proved to be difficult for Butrón, although he did record several top-ten race finished towards the end of the season, with a best race finish of seventh in Latvia. Back in Spain, Butrón won his third Elite-MX1 championship in a row, again recording a perfect season, making him unbeaten for two years domestically. At that season's Motocross des Nations in France, Butrón formed part of the Spanish team that finished eleventh in the final standings. He extended his time with the Marchetti team for the 2016 FIM Motocross World Championship, recording four top-ten race finishes but mainly finishing in the early to-mid teens for fifteenth in the final standings. He was again dominant in the Elite-MX1 class in Spain, winning five of the six rounds of the series on the way to the title but losing his streak of winning every race. The 2016 Motocross des Nations was a high point of the year individually for Butrón, as he showed good speed throughout the weekend, finishing in sixth in his qualifying race before recording a ninth in the final race on the Sunday.

Again renewing with the Marchetti team, Butrón slipped further down the MXGP rankings in the 2017 FIM Motocross World Championship, a single tenth place being the high point on his way to nineteenth in the final standings after missing four rounds from injury. This did not stop him again taking the Elite-MX1 title in Spain, although as not as in as dominant a fashion as previous years. At the 2017 Motocross des Nations, he formed part of the Spanish team that finished in eighteenth overall. Butrón had his final season with the Marchetti team in the 2018 FIM Motocross World Championship, finishing twentieth in the final standings after not finishing in the top-ten throughout the season. He was engaged in a close championship battle with Harri Kullas in the Spanish Motocross Championship but ultimately came out on top to take his sixth Elite-MX1 championship in a row. At the 2018 Motocross des Nations, Butrón was part of the Spanish team that finished seventh, the highest position the team achieved while he was representing them.

The 2019 FIM Motocross World Championship saw Butrón move to the Czech-based JD Gunnex KTM Racing Team. After four rounds of the season he sustained an ankle injury in training that ruled him out for the remainder of the year. This also derailed his championship push domestically as he was ruled out of the last two rounds, giving Spain a new champion in the Elite-MX1 category for the first time since 2012. The COVID-19-hit 2020 FIM Motocross World Championship would be Butrón's last season competing fulltime at world championship level, scoring 36 points across the season. He won two rounds of that year's Elite-MX1 in the Spanish Championship to finish second overall.

Butrón competed in six MXGP rounds as a wildcard in 2021 and focused full-time on the Czech Motocross Championship for his JD Gunnex team, winning the MX1 title by fifty points from his closest rival. He represented his country for the tenth time at the 2021 Motocross des Nations, being the best performing Spanish rider as they finished sixteenth overall. In addition, he was involved in a close three-way battle for the Elite-MX1 title in Spain, eventually finishing third behind Carlos Campano and Ander Valentín. For the first time since 2008, Butrón competed in the European Motocross Championship in the 2022 season, this time in the EMXOpen category. He took two overall wins across the six rounds along with five race wins and despite a difficult second round of the season take the championship with a 27-point gap over his nearest rival. After four years of missing out, Butrón was able to reclaim the Elite-MX1 crown within the Spanish Motocross Championship, after a season-long battle with rival Carlos Campano.

The JD Gunnex team closed ahead of the 2023 season, leaving Butrón initially with his sole focus being on the 2023 Spanish Motocross Championship. After taking five race victories and three overall wins, Butrón successfully defended his Elite-MX1 title, his eighth senior title domestically. Following this, he took his career to the United States for the first time, joining his former JD Gunnex teammate Lorenzo Locurcio in the Wildcat Race Team to compete in the 2023 AMA National Motocross Championship. In an injury-hit field, Butrón put in some impressive performances including a fifth place in the first race of the second round and sixth overall at the sixth round. He did not return to America for the 2024 season but did manage to again successfully defend his Elite-MX1 title in the 2024 Spanish Motocross Championship. Alongside this, he competed in the Venezuelan National Championship, winning the MX1 Experts International title.

After being docked positions in the second race at the opening round of the 2025 Spanish Motocross Championship, Butrón was engaged in a close championship battle with Ander Valentín to defend his Elite-MX1 crown. He went into the last round with a deficit to Valentín but after winning both races was able to take the title, marking his eleventh national championship crown across the two main classes. Butrón competed in his first MXGP race for five years when he raced at the second round of the 2026 FIM Motocross World Championship, held in his native Andalucia for the first time. The early part of the 2026 Spanish Motocross Championship was dominated by Rubén Fernández, Butrón was able to capitalise on an injury for the factory Honda man, winning two of the last three rounds to win his twelfth senior national title.

== Honours ==
FIM Motocross World Championship

- MX2: 2013 (bronze)

European Motocross Championship

- EMXOpen: 2022 (gold)

FIM Motocross Junior World Championship

- 85cc: 2005 (silver)

Spanish Motocross Championship

- Elite-MX1: 2013, 2014, 2015, 2016, 2017, 2018, 2022, 2023, 2024, 2025 & 2026 (gold) , 2020 (silver) , 2021 (bronze)
- MX Elite: 2012 (bronze)
- MX2: 2010 (gold)
- Junior 125cc: 2006 (gold)
- Cadete 85cc: 2003, 2004 & 2005 (gold)
- Juvenil 85cc: 2002 (gold)
- Alevín 65cc: 2001 (gold)

Czech Motocross Championship

- MX1: 2021 (gold)

Venezuelan Motocross Championship

- MX1 Experts International: 2024 (gold)

== Career statistics ==
=== Motocross des Nations ===
Year	Location	Nation	Class	Teammates	Team Overall	Individual Overall
2010	(United States) Lakewood, Colorado	ESP	MX2	Jonathan Barragan; Álvaro Lozano	13th	15th
2011	(France) Saint-Jean-d'Angély	ESP	MX2	Jonathan Barragan; Carlos Campano	8th	
2012	(Belgium) Lommel	ESP	MX2	Joan Cros; Álvaro Lozano	25th	N/A
2013	(Germany) Teutschenthal	ESP	MX2	Jonathan Barragan; Álvaro Lozano	13th	10th
2014	(Latvia) Ķegums	ESP	MXGP	Jorge Zaragoza; Ander Valentín	21st	N/A
2015	(France) Ernée	ESP	MXGP	Jorge Zaragoza; Ander Valentín	11th	11th
2016	(Italy) Maggiora	ESP	MXGP	Jorge Prado; Jorge Zaragoza	12th	7th
2017	(United Kingdom) Matterley Basin	ESP	MXGP	Jorge Prado; Iker Larrañaga	18th	14th
2018	(United States) Red Bud	ESP	MXGP	Jorge Prado; Carlos Campano	7th	7th
2021	(Italy) Mantua	ESP	MXGP	Yago Martínez; Ander Valentín	16th	10th

=== FIM Motocross World Championship ===
==== By season ====
Season	Class	Number	Motorcycle	Team	Race	Race Wins	Overall Wins	Race Top-3	Overall Podium	Pts	Plcd
2008	MX2	171	Yamaha	Gariboldi Racing	2	0	0	0	0	0	–
2009	MX2	24	KTM	Beursfoon KTM Team	2	0	0	0	0	3	28th
2009	MX2	24	Suzuki	Beursfoon Suzuki Team	12	0	0	0	0	43	28th
2010	MX2	71	Suzuki	Beursfoon Suzuki Team	16	0	0	0	0	26	28th
2010	MX1	79	Suzuki	Beursfoon Suzuki Team	4	0	0	0	0	7	49th
2011	MX2	17	KTM	KTM Silver Action	26	0	0	0	0	172	14th
2012	MX2	17	KTM	Diga KTM	32	0	0	1	1	291	8th
2013	MX2	17	KTM	KTM Silver Action	34	1	0	9	7	518	3rd
2014	MX2	17	KTM	KTM Silver Action	34	0	0	0	0	359	9th
2015	MXGP	17	KTM	Marchetti Racing Team KTM	35	0	0	0	0	233	14th
2016	MXGP	17	KTM	Marchetti Racing Team KTM	36	0	0	0	0	201	15th
2017	MXGP	17	KTM	Marchetti Racing Team KTM	28	0	0	0	0	122	19th
2018	MXGP	17	KTM	Marchetti Racing Team KTM	32	0	0	0	0	109	20th
2019	MXGP	17	KTM	JD Gunnex KTM Racing Team	8	0	0	0	0	16	37th
2020	MXGP	17	KTM	JD Gunnex KTM Racing Team	30	0	0	0	0	36	29th
2021	MXGP	17	KTM	JD Gunnex KTM Racing Team	12	0	0	0	0	11	36th
2026	MXGP	17	KTM	KTM TRT Motorcycle	2	0	0	0	0	5	50th
Total					345	1	0	10	8	2152	

=== AMA National Motocross Championship ===
==== By season ====
Season	Class	Number	Motorcycle	Team	Races	Race Wins	Overall Wins	Race Top-3	Overall Podium	Pts	Plcd
2023	450	107	Gas Gas	Wildcat Race Team	22	0	0	0	0	152	11th
Total					22	0	0	0	0	152	
