= Jonathan Barragán =

Spanish motorcycle racer

- Nationality: Spanish
- Born: 19 July 1985 (age 41) Getafe, Spain

Motocross career
- Years active: 2004 - 2018
- Teams: KTM, Kawasaki
- GP debut: 2002, GP of Europe, 125cc

Jonathan Barragán Nevado (born 19 July 1985) is a Spanish former professional motocross and enduro racer. He competed in the Motocross World Championships from 2004 to 2018.

== Career ==
Barragán was born in Getafe in the Community of Madrid. His best result in the world championships came in 2008, when he won four Grands Prix and finished in fourth place in the MX1-GP World Championship results, while riding for the KTM factory racing team managed by former world champion Stefan Everts. In 2009, he won two Grands Prix and dropped to ninth in the MX1-GP championship.

For 2010, Barragán left the KTM team to join the Kawasaki factory racing team.

After his motocross career, Barragán competed in Enduro World Championship for the Gas Gas team. Overall Barragán won 11 Spanish motocross national championships and one Spanish Enduro national championship.
