= 2023 Spanish Motocross Championship =

Spanish Motocross Competition in 2023

The 2023 Spanish Motocross Championship season was the 65th Spanish Motocross Championship season.

The series had seven rounds across the country, running from February to May. José Butrón was the reigning champion in the Elite-MX1, after winning his eighth title in 2022. David Braceras was the reigning champion in Elite-MX2 after he won his first title in the previous season. Butrón was able to successfully defend his title in Elite-MX1, ahead of longterm rival Carlos Campano, whilst Gerard Congost took his first Elite-MX2 title.

For 2023 points were awarded to the top-five qualifiers for the first time. These points did not count towards the overall total for a rider per round, but counted towards the points total in the championship standings.

The series held its second round at a new circuit in Lugo, Galicia named after two-time world champion Jorge Prado.

== Race calendar and results ==
The full calendar with both dates and venues was released on 2 December.

=== Elite-MX1 ===
Round	Date	Location	Pole position	Race 1 Winner	Race 2 Winner	Round Winner
1	4—5 February	(Castilla–La Mancha) Montearagón	(Netherlands) Brian Bogers	(Netherlands) Brian Bogers	(Spain) José Butrón	(Spain) José Butrón
2	25–26 February	(Galicia (Spain)) Lugo	(Spain) Jorge Prado	(Spain) Jorge Prado	(Spain) Rubén Fernández	(Spain) Rubén Fernández
3	4–5 March	(Valencian Community) Albaida	(Spain) José Butrón	(Spain) Carlos Campano	(Spain) Carlos Campano	(Spain) Carlos Campano
4	18–19 March	(Andalusia) Valverde del Camino	(Spain) José Butrón	(Spain) José Butrón	(Spain) José Butrón	(Spain) José Butrón
5	1–2 April	(Aragon) Calatayud	(Spain) Rubén Fernández	(Spain) Rubén Fernández	(Spain) Rubén Fernández	(Spain) Rubén Fernández
6	22–23 April	(Catalonia) Bellpuig	(Spain) José Butrón	(Spain) José Butrón	(Spain) José Butrón	(Spain) José Butrón
7	13–14 May	(Region of Murcia) Alhama de Murcia	(Spain) Carlos Campano	(Spain) Carlos Campano	(Spain) Carlos Campano	(Spain) Carlos Campano

=== Elite-MX2 ===
Round	Date	Location	Pole position	Race 1 Winner	Race 2 Winner	Round Winner
1	4–5 February	(Castilla–La Mancha) Montearagón	(Spain) Samuel Nilsson	(Belgium) Lucas Coenen	(Belgium) Lucas Coenen	(Belgium) Lucas Coenen
2	25–26 February	(Galicia (Spain)) Lugo	(Spain) Samuel Nilsson	(Spain) Samuel Nilsson	(Spain) Víctor Alonso	(Spain) Víctor Alonso
3	4–5 March	(Valencian Community) Albaida	(Spain) Gerard Congost	(Spain) Gerard Congost	(Spain) Gerard Congost	(Spain) Gerard Congost
4	18–19 March	(Andalusia) Valverde del Camino	(Spain) Gerard Congost	(Spain) Gerard Congost	(Spain) Edgar Canet	(Spain) Gerard Congost
5	1–2 April	(Aragon) Calatayud	(Spain) Adriá Monné	(Spain) Adriá Monné	(Spain) Adriá Monné	(Spain) Adriá Monné
6	22–23 April	(Catalonia) Bellpuig	(Spain) Adriá Monné	(Spain) Gerard Congost	(Spain) Gerard Congost	(Spain) Gerard Congost
7	13–14 May	(Region of Murcia) Alhama de Murcia	(Spain) Samuel Nilsson	(Spain) Samuel Nilsson	(Spain) Adriá Monné	(Spain) Samuel Nilsson

=== Circuit locations ===
2023 Spanish Motocross Championship locations

== Elite-MX1 ==
Five time world champion Jeffrey Herlings was scheduled to compete at the opening round of the series but had to withdraw due to flu. Grand Prix winner Brian Bogers did compete in the first round in preparation for the 2023 FIM Motocross World Championship.

=== Participants ===
Team	Constructor	No	Rider	Rounds
	Honda	3	(Spain) José Javier Paisan	2
Osička MX Team	KTM	4	(Slovakia) Tomáš Kohút	3
Osička MX Team	KTM	53	(Slovakia) Šimon Jošt	3
Team JCR&Katharsis	Kawasaki	5	(Spain) Carlos Abel	All
Team JCR&Katharsis	Yamaha	27	(Spain) Aleix Diaz	All
Team JCR&Katharsis	Kawasaki	225	(Spain) Marc Fontanals	All
B.R. Motos Husqvarna	Husqvarna	7	(Spain) Nil Bussot	All
Escuela de Pilotos Román Pérez	Yamaha	9	(Spain) Román Pérez	2
	Husqvarna	11	(Spain) Jonathan Rincon	5
	Husqvarna	13	(Spain) Ivan Lacuesta	1, 3
Motos Arribas - Xalo Offroad	Husqvarna	14	(Spain) Breogan Touriñan	2
Hardworkbikes	KTM	15	(Spain) Ángel Perales	5–6
TRT Motorcycles	KTM	17	(Spain) José Butrón	All
Kawasaki BoxZero Racing Team	Kawasaki	22	(Spain) Francesc Mataró	1, 3, 5–7
DLR57	Honda	25	(Spain) Bruno Darias	All
DLR57	Honda	57	(Spain) Pablo de la Rosa	4
Team Pajareros	KTM	26	(Spain) Pau Salas	3
Team Motorland Husqvarna	Husqvarna	29	(Spain) Jonathan Gimenez	1, 3
Team Bernárdez	Honda	29	(Spain) Aarón Bernárdez	2
	Kawasaki	33	(Spain) Lluis Sanz	1–3, 5–7
Team Motocebri	Honda	35	(Spain) Pablo Cebrian	1–2
Team Motocebri	Honda	94	(Spain) Alvaro Cebrian	1–2
	Honda	35	(Spain) Pedro Jesus Herrera	4
Yamaha Monster Energy Geração	Yamaha	38	(Brazil) Fábio Santos	2–4
	KTM	40	(Spain) José Luis Dauden	1, 7
Ausio Racing Team	Yamaha	44	(Spain) Nil Arcarons	1–3, 6–7
	Yamaha	45	(China) Sunier	5
Team Castro	Kawasaki	51	(Spain) Sergio Castro	1–6
MJR Racing	Yamaha	60	(Spain) Julián Simón	3
Red Bull Gas Gas Factory Racing	Gas Gas	61	(Spain) Jorge Prado	2
KTM Spain	KTM	67	(Spain) Yago Martínez	All
Team Honda HRC	Honda	70	(Spain) Rubén Fernández	2, 5
Txarandaka - UTR Racing	KTM	71	(Spain) Iker Uterga	2
	KTM	78	(Spain) José Javier Corbalán	3, 7
Mad Motos	Kawasaki	80	(Spain) Sergio Sánchez	1–4
	Husqvarna	84	(Spain) Sergio Arias	2
Andreu28 Competicion	Gas Gas	88	(Spain) Bruno Bozzo	3
IRS Nurcris Sevilla la Nueva	Kawasaki	90	(Spain) Angel Farias	7
Valiente Racing	KTM	91	(Spain) Carlos Valiente	7
GRMXPRO	Husqvarna	92	(Spain) Ander Valentín	1–3, 5–7
GRMXPRO	Husqvarna	125	(Spain) Ion Ander Rodríguez	All
	KTM	98	(Spain) Sergio Valera	5–6
E.Castro	Yamaha	99	(Spain) Isaac García	4
Motos Arribas	Husqvarna	101	(Spain) Xurxo Prol	All
Yamaha E.Castro Bedetec	Yamaha	115	(Spain) Carlos Campano	All
	Gas Gas	118	(Spain) Carlos Sanz	1
Filten Racing	Yamaha	121	(Denmark) Mathias Jørgensen	2
Motorgas	Husqvarna	124	(Spain) Simeó Ubach	All
	Husqvarna	133	(Spain) José Daniel Martín	2
Gas Gas TRT Motorcycles	Gas Gas	135	(Spain) Heriberto Cruz	All
	Honda	169	(Spain) David Noya	5–7
Standing Construct Honda MXGP	Honda	189	(Netherlands) Brian Bogers	1
Tecnibikes	Kawasaki	192	(Spain) David Villalba	4
Renter Racing	KTM	197	(Slovakia) Denis Poláš	3
ETG Racing	KTM	201	(Spain) Roger Gallart	1, 5
Yamaha Speedcity	Yamaha	211	(Portugal) Paulo Alberto	2
CGA Talleres Pedro Fernandez	Kawasaki	241	(Spain) Borja Ramon Mugica	7
Jezyk Racing Team	KTM	276	(Spain) Joan David Rosell	5
Jezyk Racing Team	KTM	501	(Spain) Roger Oliver	All
KRTZ Motorsport	KTM	311	(Czech Republic) Marek Nešpor	3
	KTM	313	(Spain) Alex Romero	5, 7
	Honda	333	(Spain) Ruben Herrera	5–6
	Gas Gas	628	(Spain) Alfredo Lancha	2–5
	Yamaha	817	(Spain) Patricio Zamora	3
	KTM	961	(Spain) Oscar Corominas	1

=== Riders Championship ===
Points are awarded to the top-five finishers of the qualifying race, in the following format:

Position	1st	2nd	3rd	4th	5th
Points	5	4	3	2	1

Points are awarded to finishers of the main races, in the following format:

Position	1st	2nd	3rd	4th	5th	6th	7th	8th	9th	10th	11th	12th	13th	14th	15th	16th	17th	18th	19th	20th
Points	25	22	20	18	16	15	14	13	12	11	10	9	8	7	6	5	4	3	2	1

Pos	Rider	Bike	MON (Castilla–La Mancha)		LUG (Galicia (Spain))		ALB (Valencian Community)		VAL (Andalusia)		CAL (Aragon)		BEL (Catalonia)		ALH (Region of Murcia)		Points
1	(Spain) José Butrón	KTM	2^{+4}	1	Ret^{+4}	DNS	2^{+5}	4	1^{+5}	1	3^{+3}	2	1^{+5}	1	2^{+4}	2	303
2	(Spain) Carlos Campano	Yamaha	3^{+3}	2	5	3	1^{+4}	1	Ret^{+4}	2	2^{+4}	3	20^{+4}	2	1^{+5}	1	289
3	(Spain) Yago Martínez	KTM	6	12	3^{+3}	4	4	2	6^{+2}	10	11	11	2^{+1}	3	3^{+2}	3	238
4	(Spain) Xurxo Prol	Husqvarna	4	4	7	7	6^{+1}	6	4^{+3}	5	8^{+2}	5	4	4	4^{+3}	4	238
5	(Spain) Simeó Ubach	Husqvarna	5^{+1}	3	9	8	Ret	8	3^{+1}	4	5^{+1}	4	5^{+3}	5	5^{+1}	7	215
6	(Spain) Roger Oliver	KTM	11	8	12	9	10	9	7	6	7	10	6	8	7	8	176
7	(Spain) Nil Bussot	Husqvarna	10	9	11	10	12	10	8	8	9	9	8	7	10	10	163
8	(Spain) Carlos Abel	Kawasaki	12	11	13	12	13	11	9	9	12	12	9	9	9	11	142
9	(Spain) Ander Valentín	Husqvarna	Ret^{+2}	DNS	4^{+1}	Ret	7	18			4	7	3	6	6	5	136
10	(Spain) Sergio Castro	Kawasaki	8	7	10	11	9^{+2}	12	5	7	6	6	Ret	DNS			131
11	(Brazil) Fábio Santos	Yamaha			8	6	5	3	2	3							106
12	(Spain) Rubén Fernández	Honda			2	1					1^{+5}	1					102
13	(Spain) Heriberto Cruz	Gas Gas	13	13	15	15	16	17	14	11	13	16	11	15	12	12	101
14	(Spain) Francesc Mataró	Kawasaki	14	10			11	13			10	8	Ret^{+2}	12	8	6	99
15	(Spain) Marc Fontanals	Kawasaki	17	15	17	16	19	16	10	14	15	15	13	13	13	13	88
16	(Spain) Nil Arcarons	Yamaha	9	5	DNS	DNS	15	DNS					7	10	11	9	81
17	(Spain) Bruno Darias	Honda	15	14	16	14	Ret	Ret	13	20	14	17	12	14	Ret	DNS	61
18	(Spain) Jorge Prado	Gas Gas			1^{+5}	2											52
19	(Slovakia) Šimon Jošt	KTM					3^{+3}	7									37
20	(Spain) Ángel Perales	KTM									16	13	10	11			34
21	(Portugal) Paulo Alberto	Yamaha			6^{+2}	5											33
22	(Spain) Lluis Sanz	Kawasaki	19	16	Ret	18	20	20			Ret	DNS	16	18	15	14	33
23	(Netherlands) Brian Bogers	Honda	1^{+5}	Ret													30
24	(Spain) Sergio Sánchez	Kawasaki	7	6	Ret	DNS	Ret	DNS	20	DNS							30
25	(Slovakia) Tomáš Kohút	KTM					8	5									29
26	(Spain) Aleix Diaz	Yamaha	20	25	18	19	22	21	18	16	Ret	20	18	19	17	16	29
27	(Spain) David Noya	Honda									17	Ret	14	20	14	15	25
28	(Spain) Pedro Jesus Herrera	Honda							11	12							19
29	(Spain) Román Pérez	Yamaha			14	13											15
30	(Spain) Sergio Valera	KTM									18	19	15	17			15
31	(Spain) Isaac García	Yamaha							15	13							14
32	(Spain) Ivan Lacuesta	Husqvarna	16	17			18	19									14
33	(Spain) David Villalba	Kawasaki							12	17							13
34	(Slovakia) Denis Poláš	KTM					14	15									13
35	(Spain) Ruben Herrera	Honda									21	18	17	16			12
36	(Spain) Pablo de la Rosa	Honda							16	15							11
37	(Spain) Ion Ander Rodríguez	Husqvarna	26	24	24	22	25	25	19	19	24	24	19	Ret	19	19	10
38	(Spain) Alex Romero	KTM									19	14			Ret	DNS	9
39	(Spain) Borja Ramon Mugica	Kawasaki													16	17	9
40	(Spain) Alfredo Lancha	Gas Gas			21	20	21	24	17	18	20	21					9
41	(Spain) José Luis Dauden	KTM	22	19											18	18	8
42	(Czech Republic) Marek Nešpor	KTM					Ret	14									7
43	(Spain) Oscar Corominas	KTM	18	18													6
44	(Spain) Bruno Bozzo	Gas Gas					17	Ret									4
45	(Spain) Aarón Bernárdez	Honda			Ret	17											4
46	(Spain) Breogan Touriñan	Husqvarna			19	Ret											2
47	(Spain) José Javier Corbalán	KTM					26	26							20	20	2
48	(Spain) Iker Uterga	KTM			20	DNS											1
49	(Spain) Carlos Sanz	Gas Gas	21	20													1
	(Spain) Roger Gallart	KTM	24	21							22	22					0
	(Spain) José Daniel Martín	Husqvarna			22	21											0
	(Spain) Carlos Valiente	KTM													22	21	0
	(Spain) Angel Farias	Kawasaki													21	22	0
	(Spain) Alvaro Cebrian	Honda	23	22	Ret	25											0
	(Spain) Julián Simón	Yamaha					23	22									0
	(Spain) Joan David Rosell	KTM									23	23					0
	(Spain) Sergio Arias	Husqvarna			23	24											0
	(Spain) Pau Salas	KTM					24	23									0
	(Spain) Jonathan Gimenez	Husqvarna	25	23			Ret	DNS									0
	(Spain) José Javier Paisan	Honda			26	23											0
	(Spain) Pablo Cebrian	Honda	Ret	Ret	25	26											0
	(China) Sunier	Yamaha									25	Ret					0
	(Spain) Patricio Zamora	Yamaha					27	27									0
	(Spain) Jonathan Rincon	Husqvarna									Ret	Ret					0
	(Denmark) Mathias Jørgensen	Yamaha			DNS	DNS											0
Pos	Rider	Bike	MON (Castilla–La Mancha)		LUG (Galicia (Spain))		ALB (Valencian Community)		VAL (Andalusia)		CAL (Aragon)		BEL (Catalonia)		ALH (Region of Murcia)		Points

== Elite-MX2 ==
Factory Husqvarna world championship riders Kay de Wolf and Lucas Coenen, as well as the factory KTM rider Sacha Coenen, competed in the first round in preparation for the 2023 FIM Motocross World Championship.

=== Participants ===
Team	Constructor	No	Rider	Rounds
Gas Gas Spain	Gas Gas	2	(Spain) Samuel Nilsson	1–2, 6–7
Gas Gas Spain	Gas Gas	4	(Spain) Gerard Congost	All
Ausio Racing Team	Yamaha	8	(Spain) Eric Tomás	1–2
Ausio Racing Team	Yamaha	96	(Spain) Víctor Alonso	1–6
Ausio Racing Team	Yamaha	128	(Spain) Jana Sánchez	1, 5
Ausio Racing Team	Yamaha	217	(Spain) Ivan Polvillo	4
Bud Racing España	Gas Gas	11	(Spain) Gilen Albisua	6–7
Bud Racing España	Gas Gas	632	(Spain) Marcos Panzano	All
	Kawasaki	15	(Spain) Carlos Ruiz	1–3, 5
	Gas Gas	16	(Spain) Oscar Roman	1, 5–7
DLR57	KTM	21	(Spain) Aitor Aguiar	4
KTM Namura Racing	KTM	24	(Spain) Carlos Salvador	4
Motomon	KTM	26	(Spain) Pau Salas	5–7
Mad Motos	Husqvarna	27	(Spain) Carlos Tur	2
Boutaca Racing Team	KTM	28	(Portugal) Pedro Rino	1–2
KTM SB Racing Team	KTM	36	(Switzerland) Nico Greutmann	6
KTM SB Racing Team	KTM	489	(Netherlands) Jens Walvoort	6
	KTM	45	(Spain) Erik Cordero	3
Moto Racing Canet	Husqvarna	51	(Spain) Marti Bañeres	1, 3
Mad Motos	Kawasaki	55	(Spain) Albert Alfonso	1–6
Kid MX JR Team	Kawasaki	63	(Spain) Jordi Puig	1–6
Escuderia JRB Offroad Center	KTM	64	(Spain) Roberto Otero	1, 5–7
Mincha Team	KTM	66	(Spain) José Canosa	2
GRMXPRO	Husqvarna	68	(Spain) Unai Larrañaga	All
Nestaan Husqvarna Factory Racing	Husqvarna	74	(Netherlands) Kay de Wolf	1
Nestaan Husqvarna Factory Racing	Husqvarna	196	(Belgium) Lucas Coenen	1
Yamaha Motomon Ibiza	Yamaha	74	(Spain) Jorge Rey	2–3, 6
Novelda Riders	Kawasaki	77	(Spain) Shayne Rompelberg	3
Red Bull KTM Factory Racing	KTM	79	(Belgium) Sacha Coenen	1
Last Lap	Gas Gas	79	(Spain) Gabriel Seisdedos	2
Last Lap	Gas Gas	255	(Spain) Daniela Guillén	2
	Yamaha	84	(Spain) Pedro José Alcázar	3
	KTM	85	(Spain) Iker Martin	2, 5–6
Team Salgueiro	Yamaha	91	(Portugal) Francisco Salgueiro	1–2
Gas Gas TRT Motorcycles	Gas Gas	97	(Spain) Denis Canto	1–3, 7
Yamaha Monster Energy Geração	Yamaha	109	(Brazil) Guilherme Bresolin	2–4
MX Specialized	Gas Gas	111	(Spain) Lucas Bodega	All
MP Racing Team	Gas Gas	112	(Spain) Marc Pamias	1, 6
Team Yamaha Alves Bandeira	Yamaha	141	(Portugal) Afonso Gomes	2
	KTM	174	(Spain) Liam Sanjuan	1, 3, 6
	Kawasaki	199	(Spain) Jorge Gaspar	3
DPS Motorsport	Kawasaki	207	(Spain) Aleix Marti	1, 3, 5–6
UK Racing Team	KTM	212	(Spain) Aitana Peña	2
TRT Motorcycles	KTM	214	(Spain) Alejandro Miguel	1–5
TRT Motorcycles	KTM	365	(Spain) Adriá Monné	All
	Yamaha	216	(Spain) Juan José Llamas	7
	Kawasaki	218	(Spain) Jorge Alcaide	1, 3
	KTM	219	(Spain) David Jimenez	6–7
	KTM	226	(Spain) Manuel Embid	1, 5–6
Team Pavo & Rueda	Gas Gas	227	(Spain) Pablo Gutiérrez	1–5
Team JCR & Katharsis	Kawasaki	232	(Spain) Unai Aguiló	All
Momento TT Motos	Gas Gas	291	(Portugal) Fábio Costa	1–2
Husqvarna Spain	Husqvarna	305	(Spain) Antonio Gallego	All
KTM Namura Racing	KTM	315	(Spain) David Beltrán	1
Benimoto Party Satellite	Husqvarna	370	(Spain) Xavier Camps	3, 5–7
KTM Spain	KTM	373	(Spain) Edgar Canet	1–5
MX119 Factory Racing	KTM	395	(Spain) Mario Moreno	All
	Gas Gas	425	(Spain) Samuel Panzano	1
Jezyk Racing Team	KTM	469	(United States) Jamie Astudillo	5
Jezyk Racing Team	KTM	960	(Spain) Mauro Osinalde	1
Becker Racing	KTM	515	(Denmark) Mads Fredsøe	3
Team Lledo	KTM	520	(Spain) Arnau Lledo	1–5
	Husqvarna	561	(Spain) Elio Lorente	5–6
Willup Racing Team Globex	KTM	589	(France) Kiliann Poll	6
Motor2000 KTM Racing Team	KTM	601	(United Kingdom) Kelton Gwyther	5
	Gas Gas	628	(Spain) Alfredo Lancha	1
	Gas Gas	710	(Spain) Alejandro Martin	1–3, 6–7
	KTM	722	(Spain) Jordi Galera	1
Young Motion powered by Resa	Yamaha	817	(Netherlands) Raf Meuwissen	1–2

=== Riders Championship ===
Points are awarded to the top-five finishers of the qualifying race, in the following format:

Position	1st	2nd	3rd	4th	5th
Points	5	4	3	2	1

Points are awarded to finishers of the main races, in the following format:

Position	1st	2nd	3rd	4th	5th	6th	7th	8th	9th	10th	11th	12th	13th	14th	15th	16th	17th	18th	19th	20th
Points	25	22	20	18	16	15	14	13	12	11	10	9	8	7	6	5	4	3	2	1

Pos	Rider	Bike	MON (Castilla–La Mancha)		LUG (Galicia (Spain))		ALB (Valencian Community)		VAL (Andalusia)		CAL (Aragon)		BEL (Catalonia)		ALH (Region of Murcia)		Points
1	(Spain) Gerard Congost	Gas Gas	7^{+1}	10	Ret^{+4}	2	1^{+5}	1	1^{+5}	2	2^{+4}	2	1^{+3}	1	2^{+3}	3	305
2	(Spain) Adriá Monné	KTM	9	8	4	4	3^{+2}	2	3	5	1^{+5}	1	2^{+5}	2	9^{+4}	1	286
3	(Spain) Víctor Alonso	Yamaha	4	5	2^{+3}	1	4^{+4}	5	2^{+3}	4	6^{+1}	5	3	3			237
4	(Spain) Antonio Gallego	Husqvarna	12	16	9^{+2}	5	6^{+3}	7	6^{+2}	3	3^{+3}	3	4	7	3^{+2}	4	228
5	(Spain) Edgar Canet	KTM	8	6	3	3	2	3	5^{+4}	1	4^{+2}	4					193
6	(Spain) Unai Aguiló	Kawasaki	16	Ret	7	10	8	9	4	6	7	7	7	6	6^{+1}	18	164
7	(Spain) Samuel Nilsson	Gas Gas	2^{+5}	4	1^{+5}	Ret							Ret^{+4}	4	1^{+5}	2	149
8	(Spain) Pablo Gutiérrez	Gas Gas	11	9	5	7	10^{+1}	4	7^{+1}	9	5	6					140
9	(Spain) Marcos Panzano	Gas Gas	17	19	14	13	Ret	12	12	7	9	8	11	11	12	5	123
10	(Spain) Unai Larrañaga	Husqvarna	20	Ret	10	Ret	7	8	DNS	DNS	8	10	10	10	8	9	110
11	(Spain) Alejandro Miguel	KTM	10	11	13	6	11	10	10	11	10	9					109
12	(Spain) Lucas Bodega	Gas Gas	26	20	16	18	15	15	14	13	15	11	17	18	10	8	83
13	(Spain) Mario Moreno	KTM	23	28	Ret	14	17	13	11	14	DNS	DNS	14	Ret	13	10	62
14	(Brazil) Guilherme Bresolin	Yamaha			DNS	DNS	5	6	9	8							56
15	(Belgium) Lucas Coenen	Husqvarna	1^{+4}	1													54
16	(Spain) Denis Canto	Gas Gas	15	21	12^{+1}	8	Ret	DNS							4	16	52
17	(Spain) Xavier Camps	Husqvarna					14	16			16	15	15	20	14	12	46
18	(Spain) Gilen Albisua	Gas Gas											13	14	7	7	43
19	(Spain) Albert Alfonso	Kawasaki	24	26	15	19	18	14	18	18	11	12	Ret	Ret			43
20	(Spain) Roberto Otero	KTM	Ret	DNS							Ret	14	12	15	11	11	42
21	(Spain) David Jimenez	KTM											Ret	12	5	6	40
22	(Portugal) Fábio Costa	Gas Gas	13	14	6	12											39
23	(Netherlands) Kay de Wolf	Husqvarna	5	2													38
24	(Belgium) Sacha Coenen	KTM	6^{+3}	3													38
25	(Spain) David Beltrán	KTM	3^{+2}	7													36
26	(Spain) Eric Tomás	Yamaha	14	15	8	11											36
27	(Spain) Jorge Rey	Yamaha			18	15	12	Ret					9	16			35
28	(Switzerland) Nico Greutmann	KTM											5^{+1}	5			33
29	(Netherlands) Raf Meuwissen	Yamaha	21	13	11	9											30
30	(France) Kiliann Poll	KTM											6	8			28
31	(Spain) Marc Pamias	Gas Gas	18	17									8	13			28
32	(Spain) Carlos Salvador	KTM							8	10							24
33	(Spain) Pau Salas	KTM									19	18	18	19	15	13	24
34	(Spain) Arnau Lledo	KTM	30	25	20	21	13	19	15	15	Ret	Ret					23
35	(Denmark) Mads Fredsøe	KTM					9	11									22
36	(Spain) Aleix Marti	Kawasaki	34	32			19	DNS			13	16	16	Ret			20
37	(Spain) Jordi Puig	Kawasaki	33	Ret	23	22	20	21	16	16	17	19	19	21			19
38	(Spain) Ivan Polvillo	Yamaha							13	12							17
39	(Spain) Iker Martin	KTM			17	20					Ret	13	Ret	17			17
40	(Netherlands) Jens Walvoort	KTM											Ret^{+2}	9			14
41	(Spain) Mauro Osinalde	KTM	19	12													11
42	(Spain) Juan José Llamas	Yamaha													17	14	11
43	(Spain) Manuel Embid	KTM	36	30							14	17	DNS	DNS			11
44	(Spain) Oscar Roman	Gas Gas	37	34							22	Ret	20	22	18	15	10
45	(United Kingdom) Kelton Gwyther	KTM									12	Ret					9
46	(Spain) Alejandro Martin	Gas Gas	DNQ	33	25	27	21	23					Ret	Ret	16	17	9
47	(Spain) Marti Bañeres	Husqvarna	31	29			16	18									8
48	(Spain) Aitor Aguiar	KTM							17	17							8
49	(Portugal) Pedro Rino	KTM	29	27	19	17											6
50	(Spain) José Canosa	KTM			21	16											5
51	(Spain) Jorge Alcaide	Kawasaki	25	24			Ret	17									4
52	(Spain) Elio Lorente	Husqvarna									18	Ret	DNS	DNS			3
53	(Spain) Samuel Panzano	Gas Gas	22	18													3
54	(United States) Jamie Astudillo	KTM									20	20					2
55	(Spain) Shayne Rompelberg	Kawasaki					Ret	20									1
	(Spain) Carlos Ruiz	Kawasaki	Ret	Ret	28	Ret	22	24			21	Ret					0
	(Spain) Gabriela Seisdedos	Gas Gas			22	23											0
	(Spain) Jorge Gaspar	Kawasaki					24	22									0
	(Spain) Liam Sanjuan	KTM	27	22			DNS	DNS					Ret	DNS			0
	(Spain) Pedro José Alcázar	Yamaha					23	25									0
	(Spain) Jordi Galera	KTM	28	23													0
	(Portugal) Francisco Salgueiro	Yamaha	32	31	24	24											0
	(Spain) Carlos Tur	Husqvarna			27	25											0
	(Spain) Aitana Peña	KTM			26	26											0
	(Spain) Jana Sánchez	Yamaha	35	Ret							Ret	Ret					0
	(Spain) Daniela Guillén	Gas Gas			Ret	Ret											0
	(Spain) Alfredo Lancha	Gas Gas	Ret	DNS													0
	(Portugal) Afonso Gomes	Yamaha			Ret	DNS											0
	(Spain) Erik Cordero	KTM					DNS	DNS									0
Pos	Rider	Bike	MON (Castilla–La Mancha)		LUG (Galicia (Spain))		ALB (Valencian Community)		VAL (Andalusia)		CAL (Aragon)		BEL (Catalonia)		ALH (Region of Murcia)		Points
