= Malpartida de Cáceres =

- Municipality
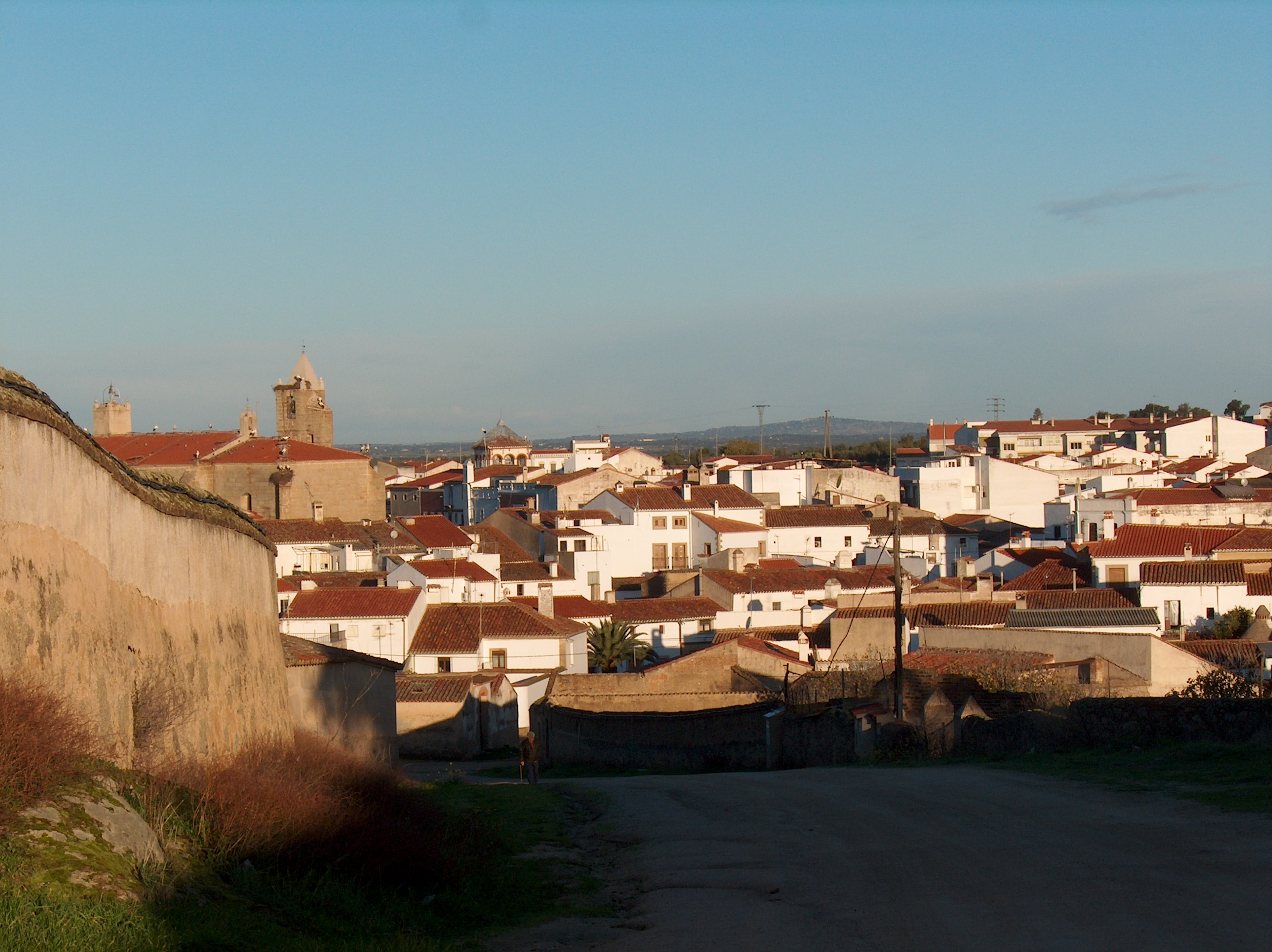

- Flag Coat of arms

- Location in Extremadura Malpartida de Cáceres (Spain)
- Coordinates: 39°26′44″N 6°30′21″W
- Country: Spain
- Autonomous Community: Extremadura
- Province: Cáceres
- Comarca: Tajo-Salor

Government
  - Mayor: Alfredo Aguilera Alcántara

Area
  - Total: 34 km^{2} (13 sq mi)
- Elevation (AMSL): 371 m (1,217 ft)

Population (2025-01-01)
  - Total: 4,027
  - Density: 120/km^{2} (310/sq mi)
- Time zone: UTC+1 (CET)
  - Summer (DST): UTC+2 (CEST (GMT +2))
- Postal code: 10910
- Area code: +34 (Spain) + 927 (Cáceres)
- Website: www.malpartidadecaceres.es

Malpartida de Cáceres (Spanish: [malpaɾˈtiða ðe ˈkaθeɾes]) is a municipality in the province of Cáceres (Spain) with a population of 4368 inhabitants (population figures on 1 January 2004). The urban centre of Malpartida de Cáceres is situated 11 kilometres west from Cáceres city.

== Natural environment ==
The Natural Monument of Los Barruecos is a protected natural area of about 319 hectares where stone and water constitute the landscape. The varied fauna of this place has the white stork (Ciconia ciconia) as its most significant animal because the population of storks, not only in the Natural Monument, but also in the rest of the municipal territory, is one of the biggest in Europe. In 1997, the Foundation EURONATUR declared Malpartida de Cáceres a "European Stork Village". The village is an active member of the European Stork-Village Network.

== Culture ==
The Museo Vostell Malpartida was founded in 1976 by the German artist Wolf Vostell. It is situated 3 kilometres from the urban centre in the Natural Monument of Los Barruecos. The buildings housing the museum were part of an industrial complex devoted to treat wool in the 18th and 19th centuries. The museum has a contemporary art collection of the Fluxus movement.

The Narbón Museum is in the town and exhibits a collection of paintings by Juan José Narbón.

== See also ==
- List of municipalities in Cáceres
