= Montearagón, Toledo =

Coordinates: 39°58′N 4°38′W

Montearagón, Spain
- Flag Coat of arms

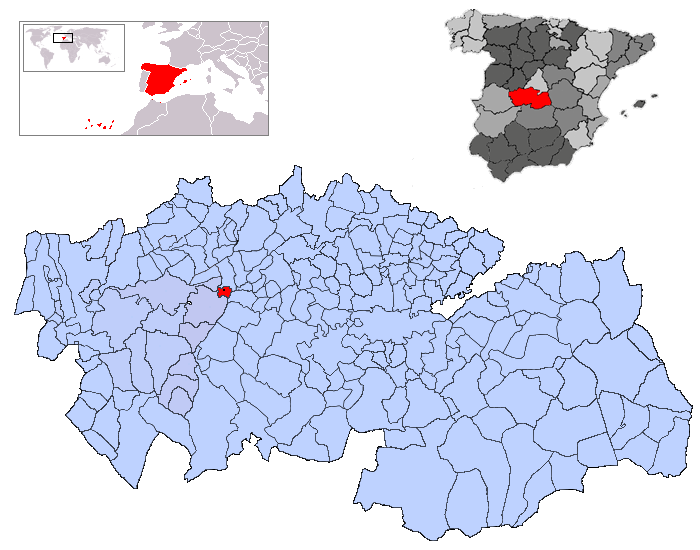
- Country: Spain
- Autonomous community: Castile-La Mancha
- Province: Toledo
- Municipality: Montearagón

Area
  - Total: 12 km^{2} (4.6 sq mi)
- Elevation: 420 m (1,380 ft)

Population (2025-01-01)
  - Total: 598
  - Density: 50/km^{2} (130/sq mi)
- Time zone: UTC+1 (CET)
  - Summer (DST): UTC+2 (CEST)

Montearagón is a municipality located in the province of Toledo, Castile-La Mancha, Spain. According to the 2006 census (INE), the municipality has a population of 549 inhabitants.
