= 2026 FIM Motocross World Championship =

World championship of motocross in 2026

The 2026 FIM Motocross World Championship was the 70th FIM Motocross World Championship season.

In the MXGP class, Romain Febvre was the defending champion, after winning his second title in the 2025 season. Febvre did not manage to defend his title and did not manage to secure a single moto or grand prix victory throughout the season. After an early season battle with Lucas Coenen, it was Dutch rider Jeffrey Herlings who ended the year by picking up his sixth world title overall, in his first season as a factory Honda rider.

Simon Längenfelder was the reigning champion in the MX2 class, after taking his first world title in the previous season. Spaniard Guillem Farrés took the MX2 crown, winning the title for the factory Triumph team, just three years into the manufacturers return to making motocross bikes.

MXGP of Australia paraphernalia, Darwin Waterfront, September 2026

== Race calendar and results ==
A provisional calendar was released on . The championship is to be contested over nineteen rounds in Europe, Asia, South America, Australia, and Africa.

=== MXGP ===
Round	Date	Grand Prix	Location	Pole position	Race 1 Winner	Race 2 Winner	Round Winner	Report
1	8 March	MXGP of Argentina	Bariloche	(France) Tom Vialle	(Netherlands) Jeffrey Herlings	(Netherlands) Jeffrey Herlings	(Netherlands) Jeffrey Herlings	
2	22 March	(Andalusia) MXGP of Andalucia	Almonte	(Belgium) Lucas Coenen	(Belgium) Lucas Coenen	(Belgium) Lucas Coenen	(Belgium) Lucas Coenen	
3	29 March	MXGP of Switzerland	Frauenfeld	(Netherlands) Jeffrey Herlings	(France) Tom Vialle	(Belgium) Lucas Coenen	(France) Tom Vialle	
4	12 April	(Sardinia) MXGP of Sardegna	Riola Sardo	(Netherlands) Jeffrey Herlings	(Belgium) Lucas Coenen	(Belgium) Lucas Coenen	(Belgium) Lucas Coenen	
5	19 April	MXGP of Trentino	Pietramurata	(Belgium) Lucas Coenen	(Netherlands) Jeffrey Herlings	(Slovenia) Tim Gajser	(Netherlands) Jeffrey Herlings	
6	24 May	MXGP of France	Lacapelle-Marival	(Netherlands) Jeffrey Herlings	(Belgium) Lucas Coenen	(Netherlands) Jeffrey Herlings	(Netherlands) Jeffrey Herlings	
7	31 May	MXGP of Germany	Teutschenthal	(France) Romain Febvre	(Belgium) Lucas Coenen	(Belgium) Lucas Coenen	(Belgium) Lucas Coenen	
8	7 June	MXGP of Latvia	Ķegums	(Belgium) Lucas Coenen	(Belgium) Lucas Coenen	(Belgium) Lucas Coenen	(Belgium) Lucas Coenen	
9	21 June	MXGP of Italy	Montevarchi	(Slovenia) Tim Gajser	(Netherlands) Jeffrey Herlings	(Slovenia) Tim Gajser	(Netherlands) Jeffrey Herlings	
10	28 June	MXGP of Portugal	Águeda	(Belgium) Lucas Coenen	(Belgium) Lucas Coenen	(Netherlands) Jeffrey Herlings	(Netherlands) Jeffrey Herlings	
11	5 July	MXGP of South Africa	Johannesburg	(Belgium) Lucas Coenen	(Belgium) Lucas Coenen	(Belgium) Lucas Coenen	(Belgium) Lucas Coenen	
12	19 July	(United Kingdom) MXGP of Great Britain	Swindon	(Spain) Rubén Fernández	(Netherlands) Jeffrey Herlings	(Netherlands) Jeffrey Herlings	(Netherlands) Jeffrey Herlings	
13	26 July	MXGP of Czech Republic	Loket	(Netherlands) Jeffrey Herlings	(Netherlands) Jeffrey Herlings	(Netherlands) Jeffrey Herlings	(Netherlands) Jeffrey Herlings	
14	2 August	MXGP of Flanders	Lommel	(Netherlands) Jeffrey Herlings	(Netherlands) Jeffrey Herlings	(Netherlands) Jeffrey Herlings	(Netherlands) Jeffrey Herlings	
15	16 August	MXGP of Sweden	Uddevalla	(Netherlands) Jeffrey Herlings	(Netherlands) Jeffrey Herlings	(Netherlands) Jeffrey Herlings	(Netherlands) Jeffrey Herlings	
16	23 August	MXGP of The Netherlands	Arnhem	(Netherlands) Jeffrey Herlings	(Netherlands) Jeffrey Herlings	(Netherlands) Jeffrey Herlings	(Netherlands) Jeffrey Herlings	
17	6 September	MXGP of Turkey	Afyonkarahisar	(Netherlands) Jeffrey Herlings	(Netherlands) Jeffrey Herlings	(Netherlands) Jeffrey Herlings	(Netherlands) Jeffrey Herlings	
18	13 September	MXGP of China	Shanghai	(Netherlands) Jeffrey Herlings	(Netherlands) Jeffrey Herlings	(Netherlands) Jeffrey Herlings	(Netherlands) Jeffrey Herlings	
19	20 September	MXGP of Australia	Darwin	(France) Tom Vialle	(Netherlands) Jeffrey Herlings	(Netherlands) Jeffrey Herlings	(Netherlands) Jeffrey Herlings	

=== MX2 ===
Round	Date	Grand Prix	Location	Pole position	Race 1 Winner	Race 2 Winner	Round Winner	Report
1	8 March	MXGP of Argentina	Bariloche	(Belgium) Sacha Coenen	(Germany) Simon Längenfelder	(Germany) Simon Längenfelder	(Germany) Simon Längenfelder	
2	22 March	(Andalusia) MXGP of Andalucia	Almonte	(Belgium) Sacha Coenen	(Spain) Guillem Farrés	(South Africa) Camden McLellan	(South Africa) Camden McLellan	
3	29 March	MXGP of Switzerland	Frauenfeld	(Belgium) Sacha Coenen	(Germany) Simon Längenfelder	(Spain) Guillem Farrés	(Germany) Simon Längenfelder	
4	12 April	(Sardinia) MXGP of Sardegna	Riola Sardo	(Belgium) Sacha Coenen	(Belgium) Sacha Coenen	(Germany) Simon Längenfelder	(Germany) Simon Längenfelder	
5	19 April	MXGP of Trentino	Pietramurata	(Belgium) Sacha Coenen	(Belgium) Sacha Coenen	(Belgium) Sacha Coenen	(Belgium) Sacha Coenen	
6	24 May	MXGP of France	Lacapelle-Marival	(France) Mathis Valin	(Spain) Guillem Farrés	(Spain) Guillem Farrés	(Spain) Guillem Farrés	
7	31 May	MXGP of Germany	Teutschenthal	(South Africa) Camden McLellan	(Belgium) Sacha Coenen	(France) Mathis Valin	(France) Mathis Valin	
8	7 June	MXGP of Latvia	Ķegums	(Belgium) Sacha Coenen	(Belgium) Sacha Coenen	(Belgium) Sacha Coenen	(Belgium) Sacha Coenen	
9	21 June	MXGP of Italy	Montevarchi	(France) Mathis Valin	(Spain) Guillem Farrés	(South Africa) Camden McLellan	(Belgium) Sacha Coenen	
10	28 June	MXGP of Portugal	Águeda	(Spain) Guillem Farrés	(Spain) Guillem Farrés	(Spain) Guillem Farrés	(Spain) Guillem Farrés	
11	5 July	MXGP of South Africa	Johannesburg	(Germany) Simon Längenfelder	(Spain) Guillem Farrés	(Spain) Guillem Farrés	(Spain) Guillem Farrés	
12	19 July	(United Kingdom) MXGP of Great Britain	Foxhill	(Germany) Simon Längenfelder	(Spain) Guillem Farrés	(Spain) Guillem Farrés	(Spain) Guillem Farrés	
13	26 July	MXGP of Czech Republic	Loket	(Germany) Simon Längenfelder	(Spain) Guillem Farrés	(Belgium) Liam Everts	(Spain) Guillem Farrés	
14	2 August	MXGP of Flanders	Lommel	(South Africa) Camden McLellan	(South Africa) Camden McLellan	(South Africa) Camden McLellan	(South Africa) Camden McLellan	
15	16 August	MXGP of Sweden	Uddevalla	(Germany) Simon Längenfelder	(Belgium) Sacha Coenen	(Belgium) Sacha Coenen	(Belgium) Sacha Coenen	
16	23 August	MXGP of The Netherlands	Arnhem	(Belgium) Liam Everts	(South Africa) Camden McLellan	(Belgium) Liam Everts	(South Africa) Camden McLellan	
17	6 September	MXGP of Turkey	Afyonkarahisar	(Spain) Guillem Farrés	(Germany) Simon Längenfelder	(Spain) Guillem Farrés	(Spain) Guillem Farrés	
18	13 September	MXGP of China	Shanghai	(Spain) Guillem Farrés	(South Africa) Camden McLellan	(Spain) Guillem Farrés	(South Africa) Camden McLellan	
19	20 September	MXGP of Australia	Darwin	(South Africa) Camden McLellan	(South Africa) Camden McLellan	(Belgium) Liam Everts	(South Africa) Camden McLellan	

=== Grand Prix locations ===
Location of non-European Grands Prix in 2026.
Location of European Grands Prix in 2026.

== MXGP ==
=== Entry list ===
Officially Approved Teams & Riders
Team	Constructor	No	Rider	Rounds
Kawasaki Racing Team MXGP	Kawasaki	1	(France) Romain Febvre	All
Kawasaki Racing Team MXGP	Kawasaki	41	(Latvia) Pauls Jonass	1–12, 15–19
MRT Racing Team Beta	Beta	4	(Netherlands) Rick Elzinga	3–5
MRT Racing Team Beta	Beta	93	(Belgium) Jago Geerts	1–10, 12–19
Van Venrooy KTM Racing	KTM	4	(Netherlands) Rick Elzinga	7–17
Van Venrooy KTM Racing	KTM	91	(Switzerland) Jeremy Seewer	12–15, 17–19
Van Venrooy KTM Racing	KTM	101	(Italy) Mattia Guadagnini	1–5
Red Bull KTM Factory Racing	KTM	5	(Belgium) Lucas Coenen	1–14, 16
JK Racing Yamaha	Yamaha	6	(France) Benoît Paturel	6
JK Racing Yamaha	Yamaha	128	(Italy) Ivo Monticelli	18–19
JK Racing Yamaha	Yamaha	200	(Switzerland) Arnaud Tonus	3
JK Racing Yamaha	Yamaha	517	(Sweden) Isak Gifting	12–16
Team Honda Motoblouz SR Motul	Honda	9	(France) Thibault Benistant	1–2, 4–6
Team Honda Motoblouz SR Motul	Honda	24	(Norway) Kevin Horgmo	1–18
Red Bull Ducati Factory MXGP Team	Ducati	10	(Netherlands) Calvin Vlaanderen	All
Red Bull Ducati Factory MXGP Team	Ducati	91	(Switzerland) Jeremy Seewer	1–6
Red Bull Ducati Factory MXGP Team	Ducati	132	(Italy) Andrea Bonacorsi	1, 4–8, 14–17
Honda HRC PETRONAS	Honda	16	(France) Tom Vialle	1–7, 9–19
Honda HRC PETRONAS	Honda	70	(Spain) Rubén Fernández	1–17
Honda HRC PETRONAS	Honda	84	(Netherlands) Jeffrey Herlings	All
Fantic Factory Racing MXGP	Fantic	32	(Belgium) Brent Van Doninck	1–15
Fantic Factory Racing MXGP	Fantic	261	(Estonia) Jörgen-Matthias Talviku	14–17
Fantic Factory Racing MXGP	Fantic	303	(Italy) Alberto Forato	1–12, 17
Nestaan Husqvarna Factory Racing	Husqvarna	74	(Netherlands) Kay de Wolf	2–9, 13–16
Red Bull KTM Factory Racing	KTM	80	(Italy) Andrea Adamo	All
Gabriel SS24 KTM	KTM	83	(Spain) Oriol Oliver	1–12
MX-Handel Husqvarna Racing	Husqvarna	87	(Switzerland) Kevin Brumann	1–2, 6–15
Team Leoparden Racing	Honda	180	(Sweden) Leopold Ambjörnsson	9–10
Monster Energy Yamaha Factory MXGP Team	Yamaha	243	(Slovenia) Tim Gajser	1–17
Monster Energy Yamaha Factory MXGP Team	Yamaha	959	(France) Maxime Renaux	1–16
TEM JP253 KTM Racing Team	KTM	253	(Slovenia) Jan Pancar	All
Wild Card Teams & Riders
Team	Constructor	No	Rider	Rounds
Millionaire Racing Team - Honda RedMoto	Honda	21	(Italy) Nicholas Lapucci	5, 9
KTM TRT Motorcycles	KTM	25	(Spain) Bruno Darias	2
KTM TRT Motorcycles	KTM	173	(Spain) José Butrón	2
Fantic Switzerland	Fantic	31	(Switzerland) Loris Freidig	3
MX-Academy Honda Racing by Meuwissen Motorsports	Honda	36	(Switzerland) Nico Greutmann	2–3, 5, 7
MCR Racing Team	Husqvarna	37	(Italy) Yuri Quarti	5
KTM Kosak Team	KTM	39	(Netherlands) Roan van de Moosdijk	3–5, 7, 13–14, 16
SHR Motorsports by Hartje	Yamaha	52	(Sweden) Albin Gerhardsson	7
Motostar Racing	Yamaha	52	(Sweden) Albin Gerhardsson	15
KTM Australia	KTM	53	(New Zealand) Dylan Walsh	18–19
Becker Racing	KTM	55	(Germany) Maximilian Spies	4, 7–8, 13–14, 16
Becker Racing	KTM	260	(Germany) Nico Koch	7
Becker Racing	Gas Gas	278	(Belgium) Thomas Vermijl	7, 13–14, 16
A-Team Honda	Honda	56	(Italy) Matteo Puccinelli	9
Ducati Riga	Ducati	57	(Latvia) Edvards Bidzāns	13, 16
Out of Africa Monster Energy Yamaha Racing	Yamaha	62	(South Africa) Jayden Proctor	11
VHR Racing Team	Yamaha	64	(France) Romain Pape	3, 6–7, 9–12
Peak Spirit Racing Team	Triumph	65	(Switzerland) Robin Scheiben	3
Racing Team Padovano Moto	Yamaha	68	(Italy) Luca Cardaccia	9
Apico Factory Racing Honda	Honda	76	(United Kingdom) Tom Grimshaw	12
Buitenhuis Racing	Yamaha	77	(Netherlands) Kevin Buitenhuis	16
Triumph Racing Nordics	Triumph	78	(Sweden) André Högberg	15
Triumph Racing Nordics	Triumph	202	(Sweden) Alvin Östlund	15
Maneco MX	Yamaha	85	(Argentina) Agustín Carrasco	1
GI Cross Racing Team	Husqvarna	86	(Italy) Matteo Del Coco	4
Sturm STC Racing	Triumph	90	(Germany) Justin Trache	3
Ducati Racing Team	Ducati	96	(Spain) Víctor Alonso	2, 10
SMX Escuela de Pilotos/LIESS Motos	Gas Gas	102	(Argentina) Santiago Montero	1
Fantic Argentina	Fantic	107	(Netherlands) Lars van Berkel	1
Fantic Argentina	Fantic	191	(Argentina) Juan Ignacio Salgado	1
JWR Honda MX Team Sweden	Honda	107	(Netherlands) Lars van Berkel	16
JWR Honda MX Team Sweden	Honda	338	(Sweden) Filip Olsson	7–8, 13, 15
Fox SA/Bikewise/Cycleworx Suspension	KTM	108	(South Africa) Johan Vogelesang	11
Team 101%	KTM	110	(Estonia) Erki Kahro	8
Motos VR Yamaha	Yamaha	115	(Portugal) Luís Outeiro	10
GCC Swiss Racing Team	Husqvarna	119	(Switzerland) Nicolas Bender	3
MB Team	Honda	120	(France) Cédric Soubeyras	9
Caparvi Racing Team	Ducati	122	(Italy) Mirko Dal Bosco	5
FM CAMI Racing Team	Honda	123	(Italy) Federico Tuani	5–7, 9
FM CAMI Racing Team	Honda	781	(Germany) Brian Hsu	5–7
Scoccia Racing Team	Kawasaki	128	(Italy) Ivo Monticelli	5, 9
KMP Honda Racing Team by DVAG	Honda	131	(Germany) Cato Nickel	3, 5, 7, 9, 12–14
Werthmann Racing Team by Mefo Sport	KTM	138	(Denmark) William Kleemann	7, 13, 15–16
Schmicker Silve Racing	KTM	142	(Finland) Jere Haavisto	8
	KTM	145	(Mexico) Víctor García	1
	Kawasaki	151	(Argentina) Tomás Montes Gadda	1
Sigmafix Tork Craft Yamaha Racing Team	Yamaha	157	(South Africa) Matthew Malan	11
Sigmafix Tork Craft Yamaha Racing Team	Yamaha	737	(South Africa) Slade Smith	11
Venemotos Racing Team	Yamaha	165	(Venezuela) Carlos Badiali	1
Honda Racing Brasil	Honda	166	(Brazil) Enzo Lopes	2
Moto Coach Elite Racing	Honda	168	(Australia) Rhys Budd	19
Moto Coach Elite Racing	Honda	281	(Australia) Cooper Holroyd	19
JHL Factory Racing	JHL	171	(China) Li Yuzhang	18
JHL Factory Racing	JHL	781	(Germany) Brian Hsu	18
Pedica Racing Team	Honda	174	(Italy) Alessandro Valeri	5, 9, 13
RAB Racing Team	Honda	176	(Chile) Sergio Villaronga	1
KTM Switzerland	KTM	178	(Switzerland) Ramon Keller	3
Kawasaki Racing Team	Kawasaki	179	(Argentina) Joaquín Poli	1
Lorenzo Racing Team	Yamaha	181	(Argentina) Fermín Ciccimarra	1
	KTM	185	(Australia) Ryley Fitzpatrick	19
VLA Racing/Total Control SA	Yamaha	201	(South Africa) Matthew Correia	11
	KTM	208	(Germany) Dave Abbing	16
AJP Racing Team	Triumph	211	(Zimbabwe) Jayden Ashwell	2
Monster Energy Yamalube Yamaha	Yamaha	215	(Japan) Souya Nakajima	19
Acema Motor Team	Honda	219	(Spain) David Jiménez	10
Dixon Racing Team Kawasaki	Kawasaki	223	(United Kingdom) Taylor Hammal	12
VisuAlz Production Racing Team	KTM	224	(Czech Republic) Jakub Terešák	7, 13
KTM Sarholz Racing Team	KTM	226	(Germany) Tom Koch	3, 5, 7, 13
KTM Sarholz Racing Team	KTM	300	(Germany) Noah Ludwig	3, 7, 16
Team GSM HBI Dafy Michelin Yamaha	Yamaha	234	(France) Bogdan Krajewski	6
Team GSM HBI Dafy Michelin Yamaha	Yamaha	241	(France) Maxime Desprey	6
Team GCR	Yamaha	259	(Netherlands) Glenn Coldenhoff	16
JMT EstTrans Yamaha Keskus Racing Team	Yamaha	261	(Estonia) Jörgen-Matthias Talviku	4–5, 7–8
Triumph Racing Pavo & Rueda	Triumph	292	(Spain) Ander Valentín	2, 10
	Gas Gas	301	(Turkey) Yiğit Ali Selek	17
3zero8 Motorsport	Husqvarna	308	(Italy) Lorenzo Albieri	5, 9
BRT Racing Team/Kawasaki Sweden	Kawasaki	315	(Sweden) Olle Mårtensson	15
Motorrad Waldmann	Yamaha	328	(Germany) Theo Praun	5, 7, 9, 13
Absolute MX KTM powered by Mark McCann 64	KTM	333	(United Kingdom) Ben Edwards	12
Chambers KTM Racing	KTM	337	(Republic of Ireland) Glenn McCormick	12
Chambers KTM Racing	KTM	811	(United Kingdom) Adam Sterry	2–5, 9–10, 12–16
Caloundra Motorcycle Centre	Yamaha	341	(Australia) Levi Rogers	19
	Yamaha	361	(China) Wu Riga	18
Ausió Racing Team - Yamaha	Yamaha	368	(Spain) Samuel Nilsson	2
377 Racing Team	Ducati	377	(Czech Republic) Martin Krč	13
Gabrielli Moto	Husqvarna	397	(Italy) Yuri Pasqualini	5
Johannes-Bikes Suzuki	Suzuki	410	(Germany) Max Thunecke	7
Johannes-Bikes Suzuki	Suzuki	991	(Germany) Mark Scheu	7
SevenSeven2 Ride Kawasaki	Kawasaki	411	(South Africa) Tristan Purdon	12
KTM GST Berlin Racing	KTM	470	(Germany) Peter König	7, 16
Brouwer Motors	KTM	491	(Netherlands) Wessel van Wijk	16
	Honda	494	(Argentina) Flavio Nicolás Sastre	1
AK MDR Motocross Team	Husqvarna	499	(Italy) Emanuele Alberio	9
Care Innovation Racing Team	KTM	521	(Netherlands) Boris Blanken	16
Red Bull KTM South Africa	KTM	584	(South Africa) Cameron Durow	9, 11, 13
Rodeo MX Racing Team	Gas Gas	611	(Latvia) Markuss Kokins	8
HTS KTM Racing Team	KTM	696	(Switzerland) Mike Gwerder	3, 7, 13
	Husqvarna	733	(Estonia) Kaarel Tilk	8
MXDevesa	Yamaha	789	(Bolivia) Marco Antezana	1
FB Factory Motorsport	Yamaha	831	(France) Brice Maylin	6
Dirt Store Triumph Racing	Triumph	919	(United Kingdom) Ben Watson	2–8, 10, 12–16
My Solar XTrue Honda	Honda	925	(United Kingdom) Lennox Dickinson	12
S-Tech Racing Products	Yamaha	931	(Germany) Marco Fleissig	7
	Yamaha	970	(France) Shaun Vinel	6
A.B. Racing Team	Gas Gas	974	(Italy) Mario Tamai	5
Moto Center Schwyz/Triumph Switzerland	Triumph	998	(Switzerland) Nico Häusermann	3

==== Riders Championship ====
Points are awarded to the top-ten finishers of the qualifying race, in the following format:

Position	1st	2nd	3rd	4th	5th	6th	7th	8th	9th	10th
Points	10	9	8	7	6	5	4	3	2	1

Points are awarded to finishers of the main races, in the following format:

Position	1st	2nd	3rd	4th	5th	6th	7th	8th	9th	10th	11th	12th	13th	14th	15th	16th	17th	18th	19th	20th
Points	25	22	20	18	16	15	14	13	12	11	10	9	8	7	6	5	4	3	2	1

Pos	Nr	Rider	Bike	ARG (Argentina)		AND (Andalusia)		SUI (Switzerland)		SAR (Sardinia)		TRE		FRA (France)		GER (Germany)		LAT (Latvia)		ITA (Italy)		POR (Portugal)		RSA (South Africa)		GBR (United Kingdom)		CZE (Czech Republic)		FLA (Flanders)		SWE (Sweden)		NED (Netherlands)		TUR (Turkey)		CHN (China)		AUS (Australia)		Points
1	84	(Netherlands) Jeffrey Herlings	Honda	1	1	2	2	Ret^{+10}	3	2^{+10}	2	1^{+2}	2	2^{+10}	1	Ret^{+7}	2	3^{+9}	Ret	1^{+4}	2	2^{+9}	1	2^{+5}	2	1^{+7}	1	1^{+10}	1	1^{+10}	1	1^{+10}	1	1^{+10}	1	1^{+10}	1	1^{+10}	1	1^{+8}	1	973
2	1	(France) Romain Febvre	Kawasaki	3^{+6}	2	3^{+7}	Ret	4^{+4}	5	3^{+9}	4	2	12	7^{+6}	3	17^{+10}	4	4^{+7}	2	6^{+6}	5	3^{+7}	3	3^{+9}	3	3^{+9}	2	2^{+9}	5	4^{+4}	13	4^{+8}	2	10^{+6}	5	3^{+7}	3	2^{+9}	2	2^{+9}	2	805
3	243	(Slovenia) Tim Gajser	Yamaha	6^{+1}	3	6^{+3}	3	9^{+8}	2	9^{+8}	8	4^{+6}	1	3^{+5}	DNS	2^{+9}	19	5^{+4}	4	21^{+10}	1	4^{+6}	4	6^{+2}	5	2^{+6}	3	10^{+6}	3	3^{+7}	4	9^{+9}	3	3^{+3}	8	2^{+8}	4					659
4	16	(France) Tom Vialle	Honda	2^{+10}	4	5^{+9}	7	1	6	7^{+7}	9	3^{+9}	6	8	DNS	DNS	DNS			5^{+2}	9	15^{+2}	13	Ret^{+7}	6	14^{+8}	6	3^{+8}	2	5^{+6}	3	3^{+7}	4	4^{+4}	3	4^{+9}	2	3^{+8}	3	4^{+10}	3	641
5	80	(Italy) Andrea Adamo	KTM	11^{+8}	7	7^{+5}	4	13^{+7}	29	6^{+5}	18	6^{+8}	13	5^{+3}	7	7^{+6}	3	8^{+2}	6	7^{+8}	4	8^{+5}	7	9^{+4}	7	5	5	4^{+7}	10	6^{+8}	5	5^{+3}	7	5^{+8}	6	5^{+6}	6	9^{+6}	6	3^{+7}	4	637
6	5	(Belgium) Lucas Coenen	KTM	4^{+9}	6	1^{+10}	1	DSQ^{+9}	1	1^{+6}	1	12^{+10}	3	1^{+8}	2	1^{+8}	1	1^{+10}	1	3^{+5}	3	1^{+10}	2	1^{+10}	1	Ret	Ret	DNS	DNS	DNS	DNS			DNS	DNS							566
7	70	(Spain) Rubén Fernández	Honda	10^{+5}	5	12	11	3^{+1}	10	5	5	9^{+5}	7	9^{+4}	6	3^{+5}	7	6^{+6}	11	13	12	5^{+8}	5	7^{+1}	8	4^{+10}	4	5^{+2}	4	7^{+3}	6	6^{+6}	5	Ret^{+5}	7	12	9					523
8	959	(France) Maxime Renaux	Yamaha	7^{+7}	8	4^{+8}	6	2^{+6}	7	12^{+2}	6	5^{+3}	5	6^{+7}	4	4	6	11	Ret	2^{+7}	6	7^{+3}	9	5^{+3}	10	6^{4}	12	Ret^{1}	6	11	14	7	11	Ret	DNS							449
9	41	(Latvia) Pauls Jonass	Kawasaki	5^{+4}	13	23	9	7^{+3}	21	10	17	11	8	12^{+1}	11	8^{+3}	12	7^{+5}	5	10^{+1}	8	6^{+4}	6	4^{+8}	13	17^{+1}	Ret					2^{+5}	9	11	10	6^{+2}	5	5^{+2}	5	5^{+6}	5	438
10	74	(Netherlands) Kay de Wolf	Husqvarna			10	8	5^{+5}	4	4^{+4}	3	7^{+7}	4	4^{+9}	5	5^{+4}	5	2^{+8}	3	DNS	DNS							6^{+4}	Ret	2^{+9}	2	10^{+4}	6	2^{+9}	2							428
11	10	(Netherlands) Calvin Vlaanderen	Ducati	8^{+2}	12	18^{+6}	5	10	8	15	10	13	9	11	15	Ret	15	10^{+1}	DNS	4	10	10^{+1}	8	8^{+6}	4	13^{+2}	Ret	DNS	DNS	DNS	DNS	12	Ret	16	11	9^{+4}	10	6^{+5}	4	6^{+4}	6	368
12	253	(Slovenia) Jan Pancar	KTM	12	18	Ret	20	11	12	22	19	15	14	19	Ret	19	11	13	7	8^{+9}	7	11	11	12	12	7	11	12	7	18	15	13	13	18	14	11^{+5}	7	4^{+7}	7	7^{+3}	7	338
13	24	(Norway) Kevin Horgmo	Honda	16	10	15	14	8	15	20	13	19	11	17	9	11	8	12	9	14	14	12	10	11	16	9^{+5}	8	14	17	10	9	11	10	9	17	10	8	DNS	DNS			303
14	93	(Belgium) Jago Geerts	Beta	29	DNS	14	13	16	18	17	Ret	25	20	16	13	20	14	18	10	12	15	16	14			18	9	8^{+3}	9	12^{+1}	11	14	21	14	12	13	12	8^{+4}	9	9^{+2}	9	248
15	303	(Italy) Alberto Forato	Fantic	20	15	13^{+1}	10	6^{+2}	9	8^{+3}	7	14	19	15	8	6^{+1}	9	20	13	9^{+3}	11	13	15	Ret	11	DNS	DNS									7^{+1}	15					221
16	83	(Spain) Oriol Oliver	KTM	14	16	Ret	12	20	11	11	15	8	10	13	12	13	13	9^{+3}	Ret	11	13	9	Ret	10	9	10^{+3}	Ret															187
17	91	(Switzerland) Jeremy Seewer	Ducati	17	17	16	19	12	16	23	24	21	Ret	21	16																											171
17	91	(Switzerland) Jeremy Seewer	KTM																							8	7	Ret^{+5}	12	17	17	Ret^{+1}	Ret			8^{+3}	11	7^{+3}	8	8^{+5}	8	171
18	919	(United Kingdom) Ben Watson	Triumph			8^{+2}	16	Ret	20	14	14	23	21	18	14	21	21	16	14			17	12			12	16	13	11	9	7	21	15	6^{+2}	Ret							151
19	32	(Belgium) Brent Van Doninck	Fantic	13	11	11	Ret	Ret	DNS	19^{+1}	12	17	Ret	14	17	9	Ret	14	Ret	DNS	DNS	14	16	16	17	16	10	7	16	15	16	16	Ret									146
20	39	(Netherlands) Roan van de Moosdijk	KTM					15	13	13	11	20	15			10	22											11	8	13	10			8	9							117
21	517	(Sweden) Isak Gifting	Yamaha																							15	14	9	14	8^{+5}	8	8	14	Ret	16							88
22	4	(Netherlands) Rick Elzinga	Beta					22	Ret	Ret	Ret	31	Ret																													88
22	4	(Netherlands) Rick Elzinga	KTM													15	16	Ret	15	22	20	20	17	13	14	19	13	20	15	DNS	DNS	19	12	17	18	14	13					88
23	132	(Italy) Andrea Bonacorsi	Ducati	Ret	Ret					25	23	16^{+1}	22	10	10	Ret^{+2}	10	DNS	DNS											16^{+2}	20	20^{+2}	8	13^{+1}	Ret	15	DNS					80
24	101	(Italy) Mattia Guadagnini	KTM	15^{+3}	14	9^{+4}	15	14	14	21	16	18^{+4}	16																													69
25	261	(Estonia) Jörgen-Matthias Talviku	Yamaha							16	21	22	28			32	Ret	17	8																							62
25	261	(Estonia) Jörgen-Matthias Talviku	Fantic																											19	18	15	17	15	13	17	14					62
26	55	(Germany) Maximilian Spies	KTM							18	20					16	20	15	12									15	19	Ret	12			12	15							57
27	87	(Switzerland) Kevin Brumann	Husqvarna	Ret	DNS	DNS	DNS							25	21	18	Ret	21	16	20	17	18	18	14	15	Ret	15	19	18	14	Ret	18	20									54
28	128	(Italy) Ivo Monticelli	Kawasaki									28	23							16	16																					47
28	128	(Italy) Ivo Monticelli	Yamaha																																			12	11	10	14	47
29	53	(New Zealand) Dylan Walsh	KTM																																			10^{+1}	10	11^{+1}	10	45
30	9	(France) Thibault Benistant	Honda	9	9	DNS	DNS			26	DNS	10	18	Ret^{+2}	DNS																											40
31	259	(Netherlands) Glenn Coldenhoff	Yamaha																															7^{+7}	4							39
32	226	(Germany) Tom Koch	KTM					21	17			24	17			12	17											21	13													29
33	811	(United Kingdom) Adam Sterry	KTM			19	Ret	18	19	24	22	DNS	DNS							19	21	19	DNS			20	17	16	Ret	Ret	19	22	16	20	Ret							29
34	781	(Germany) Brian Hsu	Honda									26	24	20	19	DNS	DNS																									22
34	781	(Germany) Brian Hsu	JHL																																			11	12			22
35	341	(Australia) Levi Rogers	Yamaha																																					12	11	19
36	185	(Australia) Ryley Fitzpatrick	KTM																																					13	12	17
37	300	(Germany) Noah Ludwig	KTM					17	22							14	18																	19	Ret							16
38	64	(France) Romain Pape	Yamaha					Ret	23					26	22	23	Ret			17	18	21	Ret	15	18	22	Ret															16
39	361	(China) Wu Riga	Yamaha																																			13	14			15
40	171	(China) Li Yuzhang	JHL																																			14	13			15
41	281	(Australia) Cooper Holroyd	Honda																																					15	13	14
42	223	(United Kingdom) Taylor Hammal	Kawasaki																							11	Ret															10
43	131	(Germany) Cato Nickel	Honda					23	24			30	26			26	25			Ret	19					Ret	19	17	20	20	21											10
44	301	(Turkey) Yiğit Ali Selek	Gas Gas																																	16	16					10
45	168	(Australia) Rhys Budd	Honda																																					14	DNS	7
46	166	(Brazil) Enzo Lopes	Honda			17	18																																			7
47	202	(Sweden) Alvin Östlund	Triumph																													17	18									7
48	21	(Italy) Nicholas Lapucci	Honda									Ret	Ret							15	Ret																					6
49	215	(Japan) Souya Nakajima	Yamaha																																					16	DNS	5
50	173	(Spain) José Butrón	KTM			20	17																																			5
51	142	(Finland) Jere Haavisto	KTM															19	18																							5
52	584	(South Africa) Cameron Durow	KTM																	25	25			18	19			DNS	DNS													5
53	179	(Argentina) Joaquín Poli	Kawasaki	18	19																																					5
54	737	(South Africa) Slade Smith	Yamaha																					17	Ret																	4
55	611	(Latvia) Markuss Kokins	Gas Gas															22	17																							5
56	107	(Netherlands) Lars van Berkel	Fantic	19	20																																					4
56	107	(Netherlands) Lars van Berkel	Honda																															22	20							4
57	6	(France) Benoît Paturel	Yamaha											22	18																											3
58	411	(South Africa) Tristan Purdon	Kawasaki																							21	18															3
59	120	(France) Cédric Soubeyras	Honda																	18	22																					3
60	224	(Czech Republic) Jakub Terešák	KTM													Ret	23											18	Ret													3
61	200	(Switzerland) Arnaud Tonus	Yamaha					19	Ret																																	2
62	157	(South Africa) Matthew Malan	Yamaha																					20	20																	2
63	96	(Spain) Víctor Alonso	Ducati			22	Ret															23	19																			2
64	521	(Netherlands) Boris Blanken	KTM																															21	19							2
65	62	(South Africa) Jayden Proctor	Yamaha																					19	21																	2
66	110	(Estonia) Erki Kahro	KTM															23	19																							2
67	315	(Sweden) Olle Mårtensson	Kawasaki																													25	19									2
68	292	(Spain) Ander Valentín	Triumph			21	21															25	20																			1
69	338	(Sweden) Filip Olsson	Honda													Ret	Ret	Ret	20									Ret	DNS			23	Ret									1
70	234	(France) Bogdan Krajewski	Yamaha											23	20																											1
71	76	(United Kingdom) Tom Grimshaw	Honda																							23	20															1
	789	(Bolivia) Marco Antezana	Yamaha	21	21																																					0
	138	(Denmark) William Kleemann	KTM													Ret	24											24	21			24	22	24	22							0
	278	(Belgium) Thomas Vermijl	Gas Gas													33	31											27	26	21	22			27	26							0
	470	(Germany) Peter König	KTM													24	26																	23	21							0
	201	(South Africa) Matthew Correia	Yamaha																					21	23																	0
	337	(Republic of Ireland) Glenn McCormick	KTM																							26	21															0
	115	(Portugal) Luís Outeiro	Yamaha																			Ret	21																			0
	108	(South Africa) Johan Vogelesang	KTM																					22	22																	0
	180	(Sweden) Leopold Ambjörnson	Honda																	26	23	22	Ret																			0
	696	(Switzerland) Mike Gwerder	KTM					DNS	DNS							30	Ret											23	22													0
	181	(Argentina) Fermín Ciccimarra	Yamaha	22	23																																					0
	25	(Spain) Bruno Darias	KTM			24	22																																			0
	219	(Spain) David Jiménez	Honda																			24	22																			0
	165	(Venezuela) Carlos Badiali	Yamaha	25	22																																					0
	333	(United Kingdom) Ben Edwards	KTM																							25	22															0
	377	(Czech Republic) Martin Krč	Ducati																									22	25													0
	260	(Germany) Nico Koch	KTM													22	29																									0
	57	(Latvia) Edvards Bidzāns	Ducati																									26	23					25	23							0
	123	(Italy) Federico Tuani	Honda									27	25	27	23	29	28			24	24																					0
	174	(Italy) Alessandro Valeri	Honda									36	29							23	26							25	24													0
	925	(United Kingdom) Lennox Dickinson	Honda																							24	23															0
	176	(Chile) Sergio Villaronga	Honda	23	Ret																																					0
	151	(Argentina) Tomás Montes Gadda	Kawasaki	24	24																																					0
	36	(Switzerland) Nico Greutmann	Honda			Ret	Ret	24	25			29	27			Ret	DNS																									0
	77	(Netherlands) Kevin Buitenhuis	Yamaha																															26	24							0
	970	(France) Shaun Vinel	Yamaha											28	24																											0
	241	(France) Maxime Desprey	Yamaha											24	Ret																											0
	119	(Switzerland) Nicolas Bender	Husqvarna					25	26																																	0
	410	(Germany) Max Thunecke	Suzuki													25	27																									0
	86	(Italy) Matteo del Coco	Husqvarna							27	25																															0
	191	(Argentina) Juan Ignacio Salgado	Fantic	28	25																																					0
	491	(Netherlands) Wessel van Wijk	KTM																															Ret	25							0
	494	(Argentina) Flavio Nicolas Sastre	Honda	26	26																																					0
	31	(Switzerland) Loris Freidig	Fantic					26	Ret																																	0
	328	(Germany) Theo Praun	Yamaha									37	Ret			DNQ	DNQ			29	Ret							28	27													0
	308	(Italy) Lorenzo Albieri	Husqvarna									35	33							28	27																					0
	68	(Italy) Luca Cardaccia	Yamaha																	27	28																					0
	991	(Germany) Mark Scheu	Suzuki													27	30																									0
	102	(Argentina) Santiago Montero	Gas Gas	27	Ret																																					0
	178	(Switzerland) Ramon Keller	KTM					Ret	27																																	0
	65	(Switzerland) Robin Scheiben	Triumph					27	Ret																																	0
	52	(Sweden) Albin Gerhardsson	Yamaha													28	Ret															DNS	DNS									0
	998	(Switzerland) Nico Häusermann	Triumph					Ret	28																																	0
	397	(Italy) Yuri Pasqualini	Husqvarna									32	30																													0
	85	(Argentina) Agustín Carrasco	Yamaha	30	Ret																																					0
	931	(Germany) Marco Fleissig	Yamaha													31	32																									0
	974	(Italy) Mario Tamai	Gas Gas									33	31																													0
	122	(Italy) Mirko Dal Bosco	Ducati									34	32																													0
	37	(Italy) Yuri Quarti	Husqvarna									Ret	34																													0
	56	(Italy) Matteo Puccinelli	Honda																	Ret	Ret																					0
	208	(Germany) Dave Abbing	KTM																															Ret	Ret							0
	78	(Sweden) André Högberg	Triumph																													Ret	DNS									0
	499	(Italy) Emanuele Alberio	Husqvarna																	Ret	DNS																					0
	733	(Estonia) Kaarel Tilk	Husqvarna															Ret	DNS																							0
	831	(France) Brice Maylin	Yamaha											Ret	DNS																											0
	211	(Zimbabwe) Jayden Ashwell	Triumph			Ret	DNS																																			0
	145	(Mexico) Víctor García	KTM	Ret	DNS																																					0
	368	(Spain) Samuel Nilsson	Yamaha			DNS	DNS																																			0
	90	(Germany) Justin Trache	Triumph					DNS	DNS																																	0
Pos	Nr	Rider	Bike	ARG (Argentina)		AND (Andalusia)		SUI (Switzerland)		SAR (Sardinia)		TRE		FRA (France)		GER (Germany)		LAT (Latvia)		ITA (Italy)		POR (Portugal)		RSA (South Africa)		GBR (United Kingdom)		CZE (Czech Republic)		FLA (Flanders)		SWE (Sweden)		NED (Netherlands)		TUR (Turkey)		CHN (China)		AUS (Australia)		Points

==== Manufacturers Championship ====
Pos	Bike	ARG (Argentina)		AND (Andalusia)		SUI (Switzerland)		SAR (Sardinia)		TRE		FRA (France)		GER (Germany)		LAT (Latvia)		ITA (Italy)		POR (Portugal)		RSA (South Africa)		GBR (United Kingdom)		CZE (Czech Republic)		FLA (Flanders)		SWE (Sweden)		NED (Netherlands)		TUR (Turkey)		CHN (China)		AUS (Australia)		Points
1	Honda	1^{+10}	1	2^{+9}	2	1^{+10}	3	2^{+10}	2	1^{+9}	2	2^{+10}	1	3^{+7}	2	3^{+9}	9	1^{+4}	2	2^{+9}	1	2^{+7}	2	1^{+10}	1	1^{+10}	1	1^{+10}	1	1^{+10}	1	1^{+10}	1	1^{+10}	1	1^{+10}	1	1^{+10}	1	1063
2	KTM	4^{+9}	6	1^{+10}	1	11^{+9}	1	1^{+6}	1	6^{+10}	3	1^{+8}	2	1^{+8}	1	1^{+10}	1	3^{+9}	3	1^{+10}	2	1^{+10}	1	5^{+3}	5	4^{+7}	7	6^{+8}	5	5^{+3}	7	5^{+8}	6	5^{+6}	6	4^{+7}	6	3^{+7}	4	893
3	Kawasaki	3^{+6}	2	3^{+7}	9	4^{+4}	5	3^{+9}	4	2	8	7^{+6}	3	8^{+10}	4	4^{+7}	2	6^{+6}	5	3^{+7}	3	3^{+9}	3	3^{+9}	2	2^{+9}	5	4^{+4}	13	2^{+8}	2	10^{+6}	5	3^{+7}	3	2^{+9}	2	2^{+9}	2	834
4	Yamaha	6^{+7}	3	4^{+8}	3	2^{+8}	2	9^{+8}	6	4^{+6}	1	3^{+7}	4	2^{+9}	6	5^{+4}	4	2^{+10}	1	4^{+6}	4	5^{+3}	5	2^{+6}	3	9^{+6}	3	3^{+7}	4	7^{+9}	3	3^{+7}	4	2^{+8}	4	12	11	10	11	794
5	Husqvarna	Ret	DNS	10	8	5^{+5}	4	4^{+4}	3	7^{+7}	4	4^{+9}	5	5^{+4}	5	2^{+8}	3	20	17	18	18	14	15	Ret	15	6^{+4}	18	2^{+9}	2	10^{+4}	6	2^{+9}	2							461
6	Ducati	8^{+2}	12	16^{+6}	5	10	8	15	10	13^{+1}	9	10	10	Ret^{+2}	10	10^{+1}	DNS	4	10	10^{+1}	8	8^{+6}	4	13^{+2}	Ret	22	23	16^{+2}	20	12^{+2}	8	13^{+1}	11	9^{+4}	10	6^{+5}	4	6^{+4}	6	411
7	Fantic	13	11	11^{+1}	10	6^{+2}	9	8^{+3}	7	14	19	14	8	6^{+1}	9	14	13	9^{+3}	11	13	15	16	11	16	10	7	16	15	16	15	17	15	13	7^{+1}	14					317
8	Beta	29	DNS	14	13	16	18	17	Ret	25	20	16	13	20	14	18	10	12	15	16	14			18	9	8^{+3}	9	12^{+1}	11	14	21	14	12	13	12	8^{+4}	9	9^{+2}	9	248
9	Triumph			8^{+2}	16	27	20	14	14	23	21	18	14	21	21	16	14			17	12			12	16	13	11	9	7	17	15	6^{+2}	Ret							155
10	JHL																																			11	12			19
11	Gas Gas	27	Ret							33	31			33	31	22	17									27	26	21	22			27	26	16	16					14
	Suzuki													25	27																									0
Pos	Bike	ARG (Argentina)		AND (Andalusia)		SUI (Switzerland)		SAR (Sardinia)		TRE		FRA (France)		GER (Germany)		LAT (Latvia)		ITA (Italy)		POR (Portugal)		RSA (South Africa)		GBR (United Kingdom)		CZE (Czech Republic)		FLA (Flanders)		SWE (Sweden)		NED (Netherlands)		TUR (Turkey)		CHN (China)		AUS (Australia)		Points

== MX2 ==
=== Entry list ===
Officially Approved Teams & Riders
Team	Constructor	No	Rider	Rounds
Red Bull KTM Factory Racing	KTM	1	(Germany) Simon Längenfelder	All
Triumph Racing MX2 Factory Team	Triumph	8	(South Africa) Camden McLellan	All
Triumph Racing MX2 Factory Team	Triumph	99	(Spain) Guillem Farrés	All
Honda HRC PETRONAS	Honda	18	(Italy) Valerio Lata	1–16
Red Bull KTM Factory Racing	KTM	19	(Belgium) Sacha Coenen	All
Osička MX Team	KTM	20	(Czech Republic) Julius Mikula	1–7, 9–18
Osička MX Team	KTM	466	(Czech Republic) Václav Janout	6, 13
Nestaan Husqvarna Factory Racing	Husqvarna	26	(Belgium) Liam Everts	All
Dixon Racing Team Kawasaki	Kawasaki	33	(Netherlands) Kay Karssemakers	All
Monster Energy Yamaha Factory MX2	Yamaha	47	(Latvia) Kārlis Reišulis	All
Monster Energy Yamaha Factory MX2	Yamaha	772	(Latvia) Jānis Reišulis	All
SixtySeven Racing Team	Husqvarna	69	(Denmark) Nicolai Skovbjerg	13
SixtySeven Racing Team	KTM	287	(Austria) Maximilian Ernecker	6
SixtySeven Racing Team	Husqvarna	408	(Netherlands) Scott Smulders	1–6, 14–17
Beddini Racing Ducati Corse Factory MX2 Team	Ducati	73	(Italy) Ferruccio Zanchi	4–12, 18–19
Beddini Racing Ducati Corse Factory MX2 Team	Ducati	97	(Italy) Simone Mancini	1, 13
Maddii Racing Honda – ABF Italia	Honda	83	(France) Maxime Grau	All
TM Moto CRD Motorsport Factory Racing Team	TM	172	(Netherlands) Cas Valk	1–5
TM Moto CRD Motorsport Factory Racing Team	TM	353	(Italy) Andrea Uccellini	9
Kawasaki Racing Team MX2	Kawasaki	317	(France) Mathis Valin	1–10
Van Venrooy KTM Racing	KTM	716	(Hungary) Noel Zanócz	1–10, 13–17
Wild Card Teams & Riders
Team	Constructor	No	Rider	Rounds
Husqvarna Motorcycles Scandinavia	Husqvarna	12	(Norway) Pelle Gundersen	2–8, 12–16
Jet Motorsport	Gas Gas	13	(Argentina) Manuel Torrado	1
GVP Access Moto	KTM	14	(France) Ilyes Ortiz	2
Lacoste Racing Team/RPM Cross	Honda	15	(Argentina) Juan Ignacio Piermarini	1
KTM Sarholz Racing Team	KTM	17	(South Africa) Trey Cox	11
KTM Sarholz Racing Team	KTM	300	(Germany) Noah Ludwig	13
Castrol Axion Energy MX by Radikal	Triumph	22	(Spain) David Braceras	1
Triumph Racing Pavo & Rueda	Triumph	22	(Spain) David Braceras	5
Vision Design MX/Glorybomb	KTM	23	(Switzerland) Remo Schudel	3, 5, 7, 9, 12–13
Team VENUM BUD Racing Kawasaki	Kawasaki	29	(Spain) Francisco García	6
Team VENUM BUD Racing Kawasaki	Kawasaki	30	(Australia) Jake Cannon	6
	Fantic	34	(Chile) Rodrigo Stuardo	1
Out of Africa Monster Energy Yamaha Racing	Yamaha	38	(South Africa) Aiden Henley	11
Out of Africa Monster Energy Yamaha Racing	Yamaha	169	(South Africa) Thor Johnson	11
Jab Suspension Bullet Bikes	Yamaha	43	(Australia) Thomas O'Neill	19
Triumph Racing Nordic	Triumph	44	(Sweden) Nike Korsbeck	5–10, 12–13, 15–16
Triumph Racing Nordic	Triumph	320	(Sweden) Sebastian Sundman	12–16
KTM SB Racing Team	KTM	48	(Netherlands) Jens Walvoort	1–5, 7–13
Q Racing Team	Gas Gas	49	(Czech Republic) David Widerwill	7
DJR Racing/Motoline	KTM	50	(Israel) Ben Almagor	13–14
	KTM	61	(Switzerland) Samuel Oechslin	3
Peklaj Husqvarna Racing Team	Husqvarna	63	(Slovenia) Jaka Peklaj	5, 9, 13–14, 16
	KTM	66	(Colombia) Miguel Rojas	1
FlyOver Competition	Triumph	71	(Italy) Morgan Bennati	3, 5, 7, 9
MX-Academy Honda Racing by Meuwissen Motorsports	Honda	81	(Belgium) Emile De Baere	12
MX-Academy Honda Racing by Meuwissen Motorsports	Honda	747	(South Africa) Jordan van Wyk	11
RFME MX Junior Team	Gas Gas	82	(Spain) Manuel Carreras	18–19
RFME MX Junior Team	Gas Gas	365	(Spain) Adrià Monné	6, 12
JHL Factory Racing	JHL	92	(Ecuador) Italo Medina	18
Young Motion powered by Resa	KTM	98	(Italy) Alessandro Gaspari	3, 5–7, 9, 13–14, 16
Young Motion powered by Resa	Husqvarna	496	(Sweden) Alve Callemo	6–7, 13–14, 16
Young Motion powered by Resa	KTM	920	(Sweden) Sandro Sols	6–8, 13–14
KMP Honda Racing Team by DVAG	Honda	100	(Switzerland) Luca Diserens	3
KMP Honda Racing Team by DVAG	Honda	137	(Australia) Deacon Paice	19
	Kawasaki	104	(Venezuela) José Morera	1
Fantic Argentina	Fantic	117	(Argentina) Juan Felipe García	1
MaxBart Motorsport	Husqvarna	125	(Italy) Alessandro Sadovschi	9
MaxBart Motorsport	Husqvarna	336	(Italy) Lorenzo Aglietti	9
Pedica Racing Team	Honda	134	(Italy) Iacopo Fabbri	9
Best Matic Team	Kawasaki	140	(Italy) Tommaso Lodi	2, 5, 9–10, 17
Cat Moto Bauerschmidt KTM	KTM	141	(Italy) Francesco Bellei	12–13
KTM Uruguay	KTM	146	(Uruguay) Alfonso Bratschi	1
	Gas Gas	154	(Bolivia) Carlos Andrés Padilla	1
	Honda	159	(China) Wang Ledi	18
ASA United Gas Gas	Gas Gas	163	(United Kingdom) Ben Mustoe	7, 10, 12
KTM Kosak Team	KTM	170	(Germany) Valentin Kees	5, 7, 13–14
Orion Racing Team	KTM	199	(Czech Republic) Petr Rathouský	3, 7, 13
Orion Racing Team	KTM	418	(Czech Republic) Martin Červenka	13
Honda Marengo Motos	Honda	204	(Argentina) Felipe Quirno Costa	1
	KTM	214	(Switzerland) Thomas Oechslin	3
NTG Racing Team	Gas Gas	229	(Zimbabwe) Riley Rocher	11
SB2 MX Talents Team	Gas Gas	252	(Spain) Valentino Vázquez	2, 6, 10
KTM Australia	KTM	265	(Australia) Byron Dennis	18–19
Boyds Moto Racing	KTM	275	(Australia) Riley Burgess	19
MGR Officina Moto	Kawasaki	284	(Italy) Giorgio Orlando	5, 9
Becker Racing	Husqvarna	290	(Germany) Joshua Völker	3–7, 12–16
Laimbacher Moto Racing	KTM	298	(Switzerland) Levi Chanton	9
	KTM	321	(Italy) Alessandro Traversini	6–9
SC Sporthomes Husqvarna	Husqvarna	322	(United Kingdom) Charlie Heyman	12
Crendon Tru7 Honda Racing	Honda	330	(United Kingdom) Charlie Richmond	12
JMC Gas Gas	Gas Gas	370	(Spain) Xavier Camps	2, 5–6
JP Pro Honda Baterias Pioneiro	Honda	398	(Chile) Benjamín Garib	1
De Baets AIT Racing	Yamaha	401	(Netherlands) Lotte van Drunen	2–4, 14
Nationwide Signs Honda	Honda	419	(United Kingdom) Joe Brookes	12–13
Team Reds 420 Performance	KTM	420	(Italy) Andrea Rossi	2–10, 12–13, 16–17
JWR Honda MX Team Sweden	Honda	422	(Sweden) Hugo Forsgren	7–8, 13–15
JWR Honda MX Team Sweden	Honda	855	(Sweden) Noel Nilsson	13, 14–15
Ridgeway RaceBar/Yamaha SA	Yamaha	423	(South Africa) Martin Ashton	11
JK Racing Yamaha	Yamaha	434	(China) Yang Jinyu	18
MS Kluky	Honda	437	(Czech Republic) Martin Venhoda	3, 7, 13
Dirt Store Triumph Racing	Triumph	441	(United Kingdom) Billy Askew	6, 12–13
Red Bull KTM South Africa	KTM	444	(South Africa) Tristan Durow	11
Husqvarna South Africa	Husqvarna	450	(South Africa) Luke Grundy	11
Chambers KTM Racing	KTM	456	(United Kingdom) Ollie Colmer	2–3, 5–7, 9–10, 12, 14–16
WMZ Racing Team	KTM	467	(Czech Republic) Jakub Zahradník	9, 14
Dörr Motorsport Triumph Racing	Triumph	511	(Germany) Jan Krug	7, 13
Seven Motorsport TM Factory	TM	518	(Belgium) Douwe Van Mechgelen	6
Seven Motorsport	KTM	518	(Belgium) Douwe Van Mechgelen	12
	Gas Gas	555	(Mexico) Dante Poggio	1
	Gas Gas	567	(Italy) Brando Polato	19
Gabriel SS24 KTM	KTM	574	(Netherlands) Gyan Doensen	6, 12–13
Complete Racing Solutions Elite Team	KTM	576	(United Kingdom) Brian Gyles	18–19
Absolute MX KTM powered by Mark McCann 64	KTM	592	(United Kingdom) Freddie Bartlett	12
Team Castellari	Gas Gas	651	(Italy) Giovanni Meneghello	7, 9
Diana MX Team	Husqvarna	669	(Italy) Luca Ruffini	14–16
RGS Racing	Husqvarna	717	(Belgium) Junior Bal	16
MX For Life Stara Gwardia	KTM	731	(Poland) Damian Zdunek	16
Schepers Racing	Honda	880	(Netherlands) Sven Dijk	16
SevenSeven2 Ride Kawasaki	Kawasaki	912	(United Kingdom) Joel Rizzi	12
Meca Motor	KTM	938	(Brazil) Rodolfo Bicalho	2–10, 12–13, 15, 17

==== Riders Championship ====
Points are awarded to the top-ten finishers of the qualifying race, in the following format:

Position	1st	2nd	3rd	4th	5th	6th	7th	8th	9th	10th
Points	10	9	8	7	6	5	4	3	2	1

Points are awarded to finishers of the main races, in the following format:

Position	1st	2nd	3rd	4th	5th	6th	7th	8th	9th	10th	11th	12th	13th	14th	15th	16th	17th	18th	19th	20th
Points	25	22	20	18	16	15	14	13	12	11	10	9	8	7	6	5	4	3	2	1

Pos	Nr	Rider	Bike	ARG (Argentina)		AND (Andalusia)		SUI (Switzerland)		SAR (Sardinia)		TRE		FRA (France)		GER (Germany)		LAT (Latvia)		ITA (Italy)		POR (Portugal)		RSA (South Africa)		GBR (United Kingdom)		CZE (Czech Republic)		FLA (Flanders)		SWE (Sweden)		NED (Netherlands)		TUR (Turkey)		CHN (China)		AUS (Australia)		Points
1	99	(Spain) Guillem Farrés	Triumph	3^{+9}	4	1^{+8}	Ret	4^{+4}	1	7^{+1}	10	3^{+9}	2	1^{+7}	1	6^{+7}	4	4^{+3}	4	1^{+9}	5	1^{+10}	1	1^{+9}	1	1^{+9}	1	1^{+8}	2	3^{+8}	2	6	4	3^{+8}	3	2^{+10}	1	4^{+10}	1	2^{+7}	5	904
2	8	(South Africa) Camden McLellan	Triumph	6^{+6}	2	2^{+9}	1	8^{+9}	Ret	6^{+6}	3	8	11	3^{+6}	2	3^{+10}	6	3^{+6}	2	7^{+8}	1	4^{+6}	5	5^{+8}	4	4^{+8}	3	2^{+7}	4	1^{+10}	1	3^{+8}	3	1^{+9}	2	3^{+6}	4	1^{+8}	2	1^{+10}	2	868
3	19	(Belgium) Sacha Coenen	KTM	2^{+10}	Ret	7^{+10}	2	2^{+10}	7	1^{+10}	2	1^{+10}	1	8^{+4}	6	1^{+5}	2	1^{+10}	1	2^{+7}	2	6^{+9}	2	2^{+4}	6	10^{+7}	5	7^{+5}	7	6^{+7}	7	1^{+6}	1	2^{+7}	4	15^{+9}	14	5^{+9}	17	5^{+5}	4	814
4	26	(Belgium) Liam Everts	Husqvarna	7^{+7}	3	6^{+4}	7	3^{+5}	2	3^{+7}	4	4^{+6}	9	5^{+9}	4	7^{+8}	7	7^{+5}	7	4^{+2}	3	5^{+7}	3	6^{+5}	5	3^{+6}	4	12^{+9}	1	Ret^{+6}	5	2^{+9}	2	4^{+10}	1	4^{+8}	2	3^{+6}	3	3^{+8}	1	795
5	1	(Germany) Simon Längenfelder	KTM	1	1	3^{+7}	3	1^{+7}	3	2^{+9}	1	10^{+8}	3	4^{+5}	7	8^{+3}	3	5^{+8}	19	3	12	3^{+8}	6	3^{+10}	2	2^{+10}	2	5^{+10}	Ret	2^{+9}	3	5^{+10}	5	7^{+5}	6	1^{+7}	3	2^{+7}	8	DNS	DNS	768
6	772	(Latvia) Jānis Reišulis	Yamaha	4^{+5}	6	5^{+6}	5	7^{+3}	9	4^{+8}	9	12^{+3}	6	6^{+8}	5	4^{+9}	5	8^{+4}	10	8^{+5}	9	2^{+5}	4	4^{+7}	3	5^{+5}	8	3^{+6}	5	5^{+5}	6	4^{+7}	6	6^{+6}	7	6^{+5}	DSQ	7^{+5}	4	4^{+9}	3	691
7	47	(Latvia) Kārlis Reišulis	Yamaha	9^{+1}	5	9^{+3}	8	6^{+1}	6	11	5	5^{+4}	5	14	11	10^{+1}	12	6	3	14^{+3}	10	10^{+4}	7	7^{+6}	7	8^{+1}	6	4^{+2}	3	4^{+4}	4	10	7	8^{+3}	5	9^{+3}	7	11^{+1}	6	9^{+3}	9	555
8	18	(Italy) Valerio Lata	Honda	8^{+4}	Ret	8	4	5^{+8}	4	10^{+3}	20	11^{+7}	10	12^{+1}	8	5^{+4}	8	19^{+9}	5	11	6	8^{+1}	20	12^{+1}	9	7^{+3}	9	9^{+4}	12	9^{+1}	11	11^{+3}	8	5^{+4}	8							414
9	20	(Czech Republic) Julius Mikula	KTM	Ret^{+3}	9	12	10	Ret^{+2}	8	5	8	6^{+1}	4	7	18	9^{+2}	Ret			6	8	7^{+2}	9	9	13	6^{+4}	7	6^{+3}	9	7^{+2}	8	8^{+4}	9	12^{+2}	DNS	5^{+2}	8	12^{+3}	15			401
10	33	(Netherlands) Kay Karssemakers	Kawasaki	11	Ret	10^{+2}	9	10	11	8^{+4}	7	9^{+2}	8	Ret	DNS	11	9	10^{+2}	9	12^{+1}	11	13^{+3}	8	11	11	Ret	11	13	8	Ret^{+3}	Ret	9^{+5}	20	Ret	9	8	5	6^{+4}	5	7^{+6}	6	388
11	83	(France) Maxime Grau	Honda	DNS	DNS	18	15	9	Ret	13	13	7	Ret	9	9	12	11	11	11	9	7	20	11	10^{+3}	8	11	10	8	6	13	13	7^{+2}	11	Ret	DNS	7^{+4}	6	9	10	8^{+2}	7	354
12	317	(France) Mathis Valin	Kawasaki	5^{+8}	7	4^{+5}	6	Ret^{+6}	5	Ret^{+5}	6	2^{+5}	7	2^{+10}	3	2^{+6}	1	2^{+7}	6	5^{+10}	4	DNS	DNS																			352
13	716	(Hungary) Noel Zanócz	KTM	16	Ret	15	14	13	18	15	12	14	16	13	12	14	10	12	13	13^{+6}	14	14	Ret					14^{+1}	14	11	9	12	10	10	11	10	9					237
14	73	(Italy) Ferruccio Zanchi	Ducati							20^{+2}	14	15	Ret	11^{+2}	14	15	13	16	8	10	13	9	14	13	10	Ret^{+2}	DNS											10	9	10^{+1}	10	172
15	48	(Netherlands) Jens Walvoort	KTM	10	11	11^{+1}	13	12	10	DNS	DNS	DNS	DNS			13	DNS	9^{+1}	12	19^{+4}	15	11	10	8^{+2}	12	9	12	DNS	DNS													168
16	408	(Netherlands) Scott Smulders	Husqvarna	15	10	13	12	21	Ret	12	11	Ret	17	Ret	DNS															10	12	14	13	9^{+1}	10	11^{+1}	10					138
17	420	(Italy) Andrea Rossi	KTM			16	18	15	16	16	16	20	18	22	19	Ret	15	15	16	15	16	16	13			19	20	DNS	DNS					13	15	12	11					112
18	172	(Netherlands) Cas Valk	TM	14^{+2}	8	14	11	11	12	9	Ret	13	12																													87
19	456	(United Kingdom) Ollie Colmer	KTM			17	17	14	17			19	19	28	20	23	DNS			23	20	15	12			20	Ret			12	18	16	19	11	12							79
20	12	(Norway) Pelle Gundersen	Husqvarna			19	16	Ret	Ret	14	15	17	15	16	Ret	16	16	20	DNS							21	21	DNS	DNS	DNS	DNS	13^{+1}	12	15	Ret							70
21	265	(Australia) Byron Dennis	KTM																																			8^{+2}	7	6^{+4}	8	61
22	98	(Italy) Alessandro Gaspari	KTM					18	14			18	Ret	20	Ret	19	Ret			17	17							21	18	14	16			16	14							51
23	496	(Sweden) Alve Callemo	Husqvarna											23	26	27	21											17	19	8	10			14	13							45
24	574	(Netherlands) Gyan Doensen	KTM											15	15											23	15	10	10													40
25	170	(Germany) Valentin Kees	KTM									16	14			18	14											15	17	Ret	15											38
26	163	(United Kingdom) Ben Mustoe	Gas Gas													17	18					12	15			14	13															37
27	44	(Sweden) Nike Korsbeck	Triumph									21	21	Ret	DNS	26	22	13	15	20	19	17	18			24	26	28	Ret			15	15	18	18							37
28	938	(Brazil) Rodolfo Bicalho	KTM			22	21	24	Ret	19	19	24	22	Ret	27	30	29	18	17	27	30	19	17			27	27	31	27			20	Ret			13	12					35
29	576	(United Kingdom) Brian Gyles	KTM																																			14	12	14	12	32
30	97	(Italy) Simone Mancini	Ducati	13	20																							11	13													27
31	29	(Spain) Francisco García	Kawasaki											10^{+3}	10																											25
32	422	(Sweden) Hugo Forsgren	Honda													29	28	14	14									24	Ret	15	Ret	Ret	16									25
33	669	(Italy) Luca Ruffini	Husqvarna																											16	14	17	14	Ret	Ret							23
34	137	(Australia) Deacon Paice	Honda																																					11	11	20
35	441	(United Kingdom) Billy Askew	Triumph											19	16											12	17	Ret	DNS													20
36	365	(Spain) Adrià Monné	Gas Gas											18	17											15	14															20
37	290	(Germany) Joshua Völker	KTM					23	23	17	17	26	26	26	25	25	23									28	28	32	29	21	21	18	17	19	19							19
38	82	(Spain) Manuel Carreras	Gas Gas																																			13	11	DNS	DNS	18
39	398	(Chile) Benjamín Garib	Honda	12	12																																					18
40	141	(Italy) Francesco Bellei	KTM																							17	16	18	15													18
41	275	(Australia) Riley Burgess	KTM																																					12	13	17
42	140	(Italy) Tommaso Lodi	Kawasaki			23	22					DNS	DNS							31	31	Ret	19													14	13					17
43	71	(Italy) Morgan Bennati	Triumph					20	13			22	20			20	26			18	18																					17
44	43	(Australia) Thomas O'Neill	Yamaha																																					13	14	15
45	17	(South Africa) Trey Cox	KTM																					14	14																	14
46	23	(Switzerland) Remo Schudel	KTM					16	19			DNS	DNS			22	19			16	23					22	25	22	22													14
47	434	(China) Yang Jinyu	Yamaha																																			16	13			13
48	92	(Ecuador) Italo Medina	JHL																																			15	14			13
49	300	(Germany) Noah Ludwig	KTM																									19	11													12
50	30	(Australia) Jake Cannon	Kawasaki											17	13																											12
51	567	(Italy) Brando Polato	Gas Gas																																					15	15	12
52	747	(South Africa) Jordan van Wyk	Honda																					15	15																	12
53	252	(Spain) Valentino Vázquez	Gas Gas			20	19							27	Ret							18	16																			11
54	419	(United Kingdom) Joe Brookes	Honda																							13	19	DNS	DNS													10
55	154	(Bolivia) Carlos Andrés Padilla	Gas Gas	19	13																																					10
56	69	(Denmark) Nicolai Skovbjerg	Husqvarna																									16	16													10
57	717	(Belgium) Junior Bal	Husqvarna																															17	16							9
58	63	(Slovenia) Jaka Peklaj	Husqvarna									23	23							28	21							Ret	25	19	19			20	17							9
59	22	(Spain) David Braceras	Triumph	Ret	DNS							Ret	13																													8
60	229	(Zimbabwe) Riley Rocher	Gas Gas																					16	18																	8
61	204	(Argentina) Felipe Quirno Costa	Honda	20	14																																					8
62	61	(Switzerland) Samuel Oechslin	KTM					19	15																																	8
63	920	(Sweden) Sandro Sols	KTM											25	24	Ret	25	DNS	DNS									25	23	17	17											8
64	330	(United Kingdom) Charlie Richmond	Honda																							16	18															8
65	401	(Netherlands) Lotte van Drunen	Yamaha			21	20	22	24	18	18																			20	Ret											8
66	321	(Italy) Alessandro Traversini	KTM											Ret	23	28	27	17	18	25	25																					7
67	117	(Argentina) Juan Felipe García	Fantic	17	18																																					7
68	444	(South Africa) Tristan Durow	KTM																					20	16																	6
69	66	(Colombia) Miguel Rojas	KTM	22	15																																					6
70	159	(China) Wang Ledi	Honda																																			DNS	16			5
71	38	(South Africa) Aiden Henley	Yamaha																					18	19																	5
72	146	(Uruguay) Alfonso Bratschi	KTM	21	16																																					5
73	423	(South Africa) Ashton Martin	Yamaha																					17	20																	5
74	320	(Sweden) Sebastian Sundman	Triumph																							29	Ret	Ret	30	Ret	Ret	19	18	DNS	DNS							5
75	214	(Switzerland) Thomas Oechslin	KTM					17	21																																	4
76	511	(Germany) Jan Krug	Triumph													24	17											30	28													4
77	450	(South Africa) Luke Grundy	Husqvarna																					Ret	17																	4
78	34	(Chile) Rodrigo Stuardo	Fantic	26	17																																					4
79	50	(Israel) Ben Almagor	KTM																									29	Ret	18	20											4
80	199	(Czech Republic) Petr Rathouský	KTM					Ret	20							Ret	20											20	20													4
81	518	(Belgium) Douwe Van Mechgelen	TM											21	21																											3
81	518	(Belgium) Douwe Van Mechgelen	KTM																							18	22															3
82	104	(Venezuela) José Morera	Kawasaki	18	Ret																																					3
83	169	(South Africa) Thor Johnson	Yamaha																					19	21																	2
84	13	(Argentina) Manuel Torrado	Gas Gas	25	19																																					2
85	731	(Poland) Damian Zdunek	KTM																															21	20							1
	437	(Czech Republic) Martin Venhoda	Honda					25	22							21	24											26	26													0
	466	(Czech Republic) Václav Janout	KTM											Ret	DNS													23	21													0
	555	(Mexico) Dante Poggio	Gas Gas	24	21																																					0
	336	(Italy) Lorenzo Aglietti	Husqvarna																	21	32																					0
	284	(Italy) Giorgio Orlando	Kawasaki									25	24							22	22																					0
	15	(Argentina) Juan Ignacio Piermarini	Honda	23	22																																					0
	287	(Austria) Maximilian Ernecker	KTM											24	22																											0
	592	(United Kingdom) Freddie Bartlett	KTM																							Ret	23															0
	134	(Italy) Iacopo Fabbri	Honda																	24	24																					0
	912	(United Kingdom) Joel Rizzi	Kawasaki																							25	24															0
	418	(Czech Republic) Martin Červenka	KTM																									27	24													0
	370	(Spain) Xavier Camps	Gas Gas			Ret	Ret					27	25	29	28																											0
	125	(Italy) Alessandro Sadovschi	Husqvarna																	26	28																					0
	298	(Switzerland) Levi Chanton	KTM																	30	26																					0
	322	(United Kingdom) Charlie Heyman	Husqvarna																							26	DNS															0
	651	(Italy) Giovanni Meneghello	KTM													32	30			Ret	27																					0
	467	(Czech Republic) Jakub Zahradník	KTM																	29	29									DNS	DNS											0
	49	(Czech Republic) David Widerwill	Gas Gas													31	DNS																									0
	855	(Sweden) Noel Nilsson	Honda																									Ret	DNS	DNS	DNS	DNS	DNS									0
	100	(Switzerland) Luca Diserens	Honda					Ret	DNS																																	0
	880	(Netherlands) Sven Dijk	Honda																															DNS	DNS							0
	81	(Belgium) Emile De Baere	Honda																							DNS	DNS															0
	353	(Italy) Andrea Uccellini	TM																	DNS	DNS																					0
	14	(France) Ilyes Ortiz	KTM			DNS	DNS																																			0
Pos	Nr	Rider	Bike	ARG (Argentina)		AND (Andalusia)		SUI (Switzerland)		SAR (Sardinia)		TRE		FRA (France)		GER (Germany)		LAT (Latvia)		ITA (Italy)		POR (Portugal)		RSA (South Africa)		GBR (United Kingdom)		CZE (Czech Republic)		FLA (Flanders)		SWE (Sweden)		NED (Netherlands)		TUR (Turkey)		CHN (China)		AUS (Australia)		Points

==== Manufacturers Championship ====
Pos	Bike	ARG (Argentina)		AND (Andalusia)		SUI (Switzerland)		SAR (Sardinia)		TRE		FRA (France)		GER (Germany)		LAT (Latvia)		ITA (Italy)		POR (Portugal)		RSA (South Africa)		GBR (United Kingdom)		CZE (Czech Republic)		FLA (Flanders)		SWE (Sweden)		NED (Netherlands)		TUR (Turkey)		CHN (China)		AUS (Australia)		Points
1	Triumph	3^{+9}	2	1^{+9}	1	4^{+9}	1	6^{+6}	3	3^{+9}	2	1^{+7}	1	3^{+10}	4	3^{+6}	2	1^{+9}	1	1^{+10}	1	1^{+9}	1	1^{+9}	1	1^{+8}	2	1^{+10}	1	3^{+8}	3	1^{+9}	2	2^{+10}	1	1^{+10}	1	1^{+10}	2	1037
2	KTM	1^{+10}	1	3^{+10}	2	1^{+10}	3	1^{+10}	1	1^{+10}	1	4^{+5}	6	1^{+5}	2	1^{+10}	1	2^{+7}	2	3^{+9}	2	2^{+10}	2	2^{+10}	2	5^{+10}	7	2^{+9}	3	1^{+10}	1	2^{+7}	4	1^{+9}	3	2^{+9}	7	5^{+5}	4	983
3	Husqvarna	7^{+7}	3	6^{+4}	7	3^{+5}	2	3^{+7}	4	4^{+6}	9	5^{+9}	4	7^{+8}	7	7^{+5}	7	4^{+2}	3	5^{+7}	3	6^{+5}	5	3^{+6}	4	12^{+9}	1	8^{+3}	5	2^{+9}	2	4^{+10}	1	4^{+8}	2	3^{+6}	3	3^{+8}	1	808
4	Yamaha	4^{+5}	5	5^{+6}	5	6^{+3}	6	4^{+8}	5	5^{+4}	5	6^{+8}	5	4^{+9}	5	6^{+4}	3	8^{+5}	9	2^{+5}	4	4^{+7}	3	5^{+5}	6	3^{+6}	3	4^{+5}	4	4^{+7}	6	6^{+6}	5	6^{+5}	7	7^{+5}	4	4^{+9}	3	747
5	Kawasaki	5^{+8}	7	4^{+5}	6	10^{+6}	5	8^{+5}	6	2^{+5}	7	2^{+10}	3	2^{+6}	1	2^{+7}	6	5^{+10}	4	13^{+3}	8	11	11	25	11	13	8	Ret^{+3}	Ret	9^{+5}	20	Ret	9	8	5	6^{+4}	5	7^{+6}	6	583
6	Honda	8^{+4}	12	8	4	5^{+8}	4	10^{+3}	13	4^{+7}	10	9^{+1}	8	5^{+4}	8	11^{+9}	5	9	6	8^{+1}	11	10^{+3}	8	7^{+3}	9	8^{+4}	6	9^{+1}	11	7^{+3}	8	5^{+4}	8	7^{+4}	6	9	10	8^{+2}	7	557
7	Ducati	13	20					20^{+2}	14	15	Ret	11^{+2}	14	15	13	16	8	10	13	9	14	13	10	Ret^{+2}	DNS	11	13									10	9	10^{+1}	10	199
8	Gas Gas	19	13	20	19					27	25	18	17	17	18					12	15	16	18	14	13											13	11	15	15	95
9	TM	14^{+2}	8	14	11	11	12	9	Ret	13	12	21	21					DNS	DNS																					87
10	JHL																																			15	14			13
11	Fantic	17	17																																					8
Pos	Bike	ARG (Argentina)		AND (Andalusia)		SUI (Switzerland)		SAR (Sardinia)		TRE		FRA (France)		GER (Germany)		LAT (Latvia)		ITA (Italy)		POR (Portugal)		RSA (South Africa)		GBR (United Kingdom)		CZE (Czech Republic)		FLA (Flanders)		SWE (Sweden)		NED (Netherlands)		TUR (Turkey)		CHN (China)		AUS (Australia)		Points

== Awards ==
The 2026 MXGP Awards ceremony was held on 20 September 2026 at the Mindil Casino Resort in Darwin, after the final round of the season.

Award	MXGP	MX2	WMX
Manufacturer World Champion	Honda	Triumph	GasGas
Winning Team	Honda HRC Petronas	Triumph Racing MX2 Factory Team	RFME Spain National Team
Best Private Team	TEM JP253 KTM Racing Team	Osicka MX Team	
Acerbis Best Lap Competition	(Netherlands) Jeffrey Herlings (9 fastest laps)	(Belgium) Sacha Coenen (8 fastest laps)	
Fox Holeshot Award	(France) Tom Vialle (12 holeshots)	(Belgium) Sacha Coenen (15 holeshots)	

Other awards went to:

- "Jan De Groot" Award for young talent: (Latvia) Jānis Reišulis of Monster Energy Yamaha Factory MX2, who finished sixth in the MX2 standings with three podiums in his rookie season.
- Lifetime Achievement Award: Ingo Partsch, FIM Motocross Race Director for 19 years, and Andy Summers, FIM Technical Director, who celebrated his 400th Grand Prix in Darwin.
- Best Promotion: MXGP of Great Britain at Foxhill.
- Best Organizer: MXGP of the Netherlands in Arnhem.
- Best MXGP Collaboration: MXGP of Australia, in recognition of the partnership between the Northern Territory and Infront Moto Racing.

== See also ==
- 2026 FIM Women's Motocross World Championship
- 2026 European Motocross Championship
- 2026 Motocross des Nations
- 2026 FIM Supercross World Championship
- 2026 AMA Supercross Championship
- 2026 AMA National Motocross Championship
- 2026 SuperMotocross World Championship
- 2026 ADAC MX Masters
- 2026 British Motocross Championship
- 2026 Dutch Masters of Motocross
- 2026 French Elite Motocross Championship
- 2026 Italian Prestige Motocross Championship
- 2026 Spanish Motocross Championship
- 2026 ProMX Championship
- 2026 New Zealand Motocross Championship
- 2026 Swedish Motocross Championship
