= 2026 Swedish Motocross Championship =

Swedish National Motocross Competition in 2026

The 2026 Swedish Motocross Championship season was the 76th Swedish Motocross Championship season. The season consisted of seven rounds, running from May to September.

Anton Gole was the reigning champion in the MX1 class, after winning his fourth senior title in 2025. Alvin Östlund took his first MX1 class national title, having previously won the MX2 class in 2015. In doing so, he became the first Triumph rider to win a title in the Swedish Championsip since 1952.

Danish rider Magnus Smith was the reigning champion in the MX2 class, after he won his first Swedish title in the previous season. With Smith spending most of his year competing in the 2026 AMA National Motocross Championship, Alve Callemo ultimately took the crown.

== Race calendar and results ==
=== MX1 ===
| Round | Date | Location | Race 1 Winner | Race 2 Winner | Race 3 Winner | Round Winner |
|---|---|---|---|---|---|---|
| 1 | 1–2 May | (Scania) Landskrona | (Sweden) Alvin Östlund | (Sweden) Alvin Östlund | (Norway) Håkon Fredriksen | (Sweden) Alvin Östlund |
| 2 | 16–17 May | (Östergötland) Linköping | (Sweden) Alvin Östlund | (Sweden) Anton Gole | (Sweden) Danne Karlsson | (Sweden) Danne Karlsson |
| 3 | 14 June | (Västergötland) Tibro | (Sweden) Alvin Östlund | (Sweden) Anton Gole | - | (Sweden) Anton Gole |
| 4 | 12 July | (Halland) Varberg | (Sweden) Ken Bengtson | (Sweden) Anton Gole | - | (Sweden) Anton Gole |
| 5 | 8-9 August | (Västergötland) Ulricehamn | (Sweden) Anton Gole | (Sweden) Alvin Östlund | (Sweden) Alvin Östlund | (Sweden) Alvin Östlund |
| 6 | 29-30 August | (Uppland) Enköping | (Sweden) Alvin Östlund | (Sweden) Alvin Östlund | - | (Sweden) Alvin Östlund |
| 7 | 19 September | (Bohuslän) Uddevalla | (Sweden) Alvin Östlund | (Sweden) Alvin Östlund | - | (Sweden) Alvin Östlund |

=== MX2 ===
| Round | Date | Location | Race 1 Winner | Race 2 Winner | Race 3 Winner | Round Winner |
|---|---|---|---|---|---|---|
| 1 | 1–2 May | (Scania) Landskrona | (Norway) Pelle Gundersen | (Sweden) Hugo Forsgren | (Finland) Kasimir Hindersson | (Finland) Kasimir Hindersson |
| 2 | 16–17 May | (Östergötland) Linköping | (Sweden) Alve Callemo | (Sweden) Alve Callemo | (Sweden) Alve Callemo | (Sweden) Alve Callemo |
| 3 | 14 June | (Västergötland) Tibro | (Norway) Pelle Gundersen | (Sweden) Nike Korsbeck | - | (Sweden) Nike Korsbeck |
| 4 | 12 July | (Halland) Varberg | (Norway) Pelle Gundersen | (Finland) Kasimir Hindersson | - | (Sweden) Noel Nilsson |
| 5 | 8-9 August | (Västergötland) Ulricehamn | (Sweden) Alve Callemo | (Norway) Pelle Gundersen | (Norway) Pelle Gundersen | (Norway) Pelle Gundersen |
| 6 | 29-30 August | (Uppland) Enköping | (Sweden) Laban Alm | (Sweden) Alve Callemo | - | (Sweden) Alve Callemo |
| 7 | 19 September | (Bohuslän) Uddevalla | (Sweden) Alve Callemo | (Sweden) Alve Callemo | - | (Sweden) Alve Callemo |

=== Circuit locations ===
2026 Swedish Motocross Championship locations

== MX1 ==
=== Participants ===
| Team | Constructor | No | Rider | Rounds |
|---|---|---|---|---|
| Motostar Racing | Yamaha | 1 | (Sweden) Anton Gole | 1–5 |
| Motostar Racing | Husqvarna | 21 | (Sweden) Pelle Gabrielsson Tell | 2–3 |
| Motostar Racing | Yamaha | 52 | (Sweden) Albin Gerhardsson | All |
| Motostar Racing | Triumph | 198 | (Sweden) Jesper Hansson | All |
| Triumph Racing Nordics | Triumph | 6 | (Sweden) André Högberg | 1, 4–7 |
| Triumph Racing Nordics | Triumph | 161 | (Sweden) Alvin Östlund | All |
| | Yamaha | 15 | (Sweden) Robin Ember | 2 |
| Double0Si6teen | KTM | 16 | (Sweden) Oskar Olsson | 5–7 |
| Bloms MX Racing | Husqvarna | 18 | (Sweden) Jakob Zetterholm | 1–5 |
| Bloms MX Racing | KTM | 427 | (Sweden) Jesper Gangfors | 3 |
| Bloms MX Racing | Husqvarna | 996 | (Sweden) Rasmus Svanborg | All |
| | Yamaha | 28 | (Sweden) Ludwig Hellberg Isaksson | 2–5 |
| TwentyNineRacing | Yamaha | 29 | (Norway) Sander Agard-Michelsen | 3 |
| Absolut MX | Kawasaki | 30 | (Sweden) Eddie Hjortmarker | 1–4, 6 |
| Absolut MX | Kawasaki | 224 | (Sweden) Teo Törnell | 1–6 |
| Absolut MX | Kawasaki | 319 | (Sweden) Milton Sandström | 5–6 |
| Absolut MX | Kawasaki | 354 | (Sweden) Viking Lindström | 1, 7 |
| CEC Racing | Yamaha | 39 | (Sweden) John Cagner | 5, 7 |
| CEC Racing | Yamaha | 57 | (Sweden) Carl Bååv | 1–5 |
| CEC Racing | KTM | 107 | (Sweden) Emil Jönrup | All |
| CEC Racing | Ducati | 110 | (Sweden) Algot Johansson | 1–5 |
| CEC Racing | Husqvarna | 412 | (Sweden) Filip Bank | 2, 4 |
| CEC Racing | Ducati | 726 | (Sweden) Tobias Arvidsson | 1 |
| CEC Racing | Honda | 810 | (Sweden) Anton Forsgård | All |
| NILS Sverige | Fantic | 44 | (Sweden) Christoffer Niklus | 2, 4, 6 |
| JE68 Racing Team | KTM | 45 | (Sweden) Alfons Stensson | 1–6 |
| KTM Scandinavia | KTM | 80 | (Sweden) Ken Bengtson | All |
| Nilssons Motor | Kawasaki | 81 | (Sweden) Axel Isgren | 1 |
| | Yamaha | 83 | (Sweden) Melvin Bladh | 3–5 |
| | KTM | 88 | (Sweden) David Krantz | 2–3, 6 |
| | Yamaha | 91 | (Sweden) Markus Tivenäs | 5 |
| KTM Scandinavia | KTM | 100 | (Sweden) David Kadestam | 2 |
| | Husqvarna | 106 | (Sweden) Olle Sundberg | 6 |
| | Gas Gas | 112 | (Sweden) Jacob Norrman | 2–4, 6–7 |
| Imago Fritid Racing Team | KTM | 116 | (Sweden) Albin Werkander | All |
| Lelles Racing Team | KTM | 119 | (Sweden) Hampus Lindgren | 1–3, 5–7 |
| Lelles Racing Team | KTM | 212 | (Sweden) Kim Larsson | 1–2, 4, 6 |
| Lelles Racing Team | Honda | 277 | (Sweden) Eddie Lind | 1, 3–7 |
| Frisk Suspension by Toftén | Honda | 128 | (Sweden) Adam Einarsson | 2, 7 |
| Frisk Suspension by Toftén | Yamaha | 568 | (Sweden) Max Pålsson | All |
| | KTM | 138 | (Sweden) Måns Eriksson Oldenburg | 1–2, 6 |
| | Ducati | 143 | (Sweden) Sebastian Santana Johansson | All |
| | Yamaha | 146 | (Sweden) Per Nyberg | 1 |
| Team Speedstore | Husqvarna | 151 | (Sweden) Hugo Schmidt | 2–3 |
| Marin & Fritid Racing Team | Husqvarna | 159 | (Sweden) Kewin Palmér | 1–5 |
| Marin & Fritid Racing Team | Husqvarna | 160 | (Sweden) Arvid Bodin | 1 |
| Marin & Fritid Racing Team | Husqvarna | 558 | (Sweden) Benjamin Löwenhaft | 1–4, 7 |
| | Suzuki | 181 | (Sweden) Sebastian Andersson | 1–3, 5–7 |
| | KTM | 192 | (Sweden) Eddie Lind | 1 |
| | KTM | 201 | (Sweden) Henning Hollertz | 5 |
| JWR Honda MX Team Sweden | Honda | 237 | (Sweden) Linus Grelsson | 1–2, 6–7 |
| JWR Honda MX Team Sweden | Honda | 338 | (Sweden) Filip Olsson | 1–2, 4–7 |
| Team Karlströms Motor | Husqvarna | 252 | (Sweden) Joel Hammarström | 6 |
| Team Karlströms Motor | KTM | 438 | (Sweden) Jonathan Jogér | 3 |
| Lifbergs Motor | Kawasaki | 278 | (Sweden) Elis Wahlman | 4–6 |
| MC Sport Racing Team | Gas Gas | 296 | (Sweden) Fredrik Theorell | 6 |
| | Husqvarna | 324 | (Sweden) Algot Hjalmarsson | 1–2, 5, 7 |
| | Husqvarna | 358 | (Sweden) Zebastian Wennerlund | 2–5 |
| | KTM | 360 | (Sweden) Nicolas Skoglund | 3 |
| Cross Centeret Snellingen | Husqvarna | 365 | (Norway) Martin Bredesen | 1–3, 5 |
| | Honda | 372 | (Sweden) Valter Åkesson | 4 |
| | Kawasaki | 389 | (Sweden) Stefan Olsson | 2, 6 |
| | Honda | 397 | (Sweden) Axel Nilsson | 1 |
| Yamaha Center Västerås | Yamaha | 403 | (Sweden) Neo Svensson | 1–3, 5–6 |
| | KTM | 421 | (Sweden) Viggo Rönnings | 4, 6 |
| OneGripper Race Team | Yamaha | 427 | (Norway) Håkon Fredriksen | 1 |
| OneGripper Race Team | Husqvarna | 505 | (Sweden) Arvid Lüning | All |
| | KTM | 429 | (Sweden) Ludwig Berggren | 1 |
| Team Keva Motor AB | Husqvarna | 434 | (Sweden) Lukas Into | 3, 7 |
| | Ducati | 446 | (Sweden) Linus Persson | 4 |
| | Yamaha | 448 | (Sweden) Lucas Appel | 2–4, 6 |
| Team ATV Racing | Yamaha | 460 | (Sweden) Anton Neidert | All |
| Team ATV Racing | Yamaha | 968 | (Sweden) Tim Eriksson | 5–7 |
| | Yamaha | 511 | (Sweden) Hugo Johansson | 4, 6–7 |
| BRT Racing Team/Kawasaki Sweden | Kawasaki | 515 | (Sweden) Olle Mårtensson | All |
| Husqvarna Scandinavia | Husqvarna | 518 | (Norway) Håkon Østerhagen | 1–3 |
| Speedequipment Racing | Honda | 520 | (Sweden) Edvin Hagman | 1 |
| Speedequipment Racing | Honda | 753 | (Sweden) Isaac Bohrén | 3–7 |
| Nilssons Motor | KTM | 527 | (Sweden) Pontus Fredman | 2–4 |
| OC1 Racing Team | Triumph | 560 | (Sweden) Liam Åkerlund | All |
| | Husqvarna | 564 | (Sweden) Simon Löfdahl | 3, 5 |
| Team MC-Konsult | Triumph | 567 | (Sweden) Rasmus Moen | All |
| | KTM | 576 | (Sweden) Axel Hansson | 2–7 |
| | TM | 584 | (Sweden) Sixten Davidsson | 6 |
| JE68 Racing Team | KTM | 595 | (Sweden) Simon Olsson | 2–3 |
| JE68 Racing Team | KTM | 941 | (Sweden) Marcus Eriksson Garms | 2 |
| Forsell Motor Racing Team | Husqvarna | 614 | (Sweden) Rasmus Varg | All |
| Team Eks El och Motor | Beta | 627 | (Sweden) William Berg | 4–5 |
| | Husqvarna | 654 | (Sweden) Pontus Sköld | 5 |
| | Husqvarna | 662 | (Sweden) Oscar Rooth | 3 |
| | Honda | 677 | (Sweden) Liam Dafors | 2–3, 6 |
| | Kawasaki | 682 | (Sweden) Arvid Stjärnås | 6–7 |
| DK692/Bygg & Schakt AB | KTM | 692 | (Sweden) Danne Karlsson | 1–3, 6–7 |
| | KTM | 697 | (Sweden) Rasmus Wikström | 6 |
| | KTM | 717 | (Sweden) Emils Kärklins | 3 |
| | Yamaha | 769 | (Sweden) Eric Andersson | 1–2, 6–7 |
| Kove Factory Sverige | Kove | 770 | (Sweden) Elias Thor | 2–4, 6 |
| Team Speedstore | Husqvarna | 781 | (Sweden) Joel Hennerfors | 3 |
| MXestore Europe | Honda | 806 | (Sweden) Felix Ottosson | 1, 4 |
| | KTM | 818 | (Sweden) Emil Gustavsson | 2, 5 |
| | KTM | 872 | (Sweden) Victor Fahlén | 5 |
| | Kawasaki | 878 | (Sweden) Oliver Magnusson | 5 |
| | Honda | 880 | (Sweden) Max Huvell | 2–7 |
| | Kawasaki | 899 | (Sweden) Fredrik Rask | 3–4 |
| | Honda | 907 | (Sweden) Anton Nilsson | 4 |
| | KTM | 909 | (Sweden) Isak Olsson | 6 |
| | KTM | 945 | (Sweden) Niklas Rohdin | 4–5, 7 |
| | Yamaha | 956 | (Sweden) Pontus Lindblad | 2–3, 6 |
| | KTM | 982 | (Sweden) Marco Kristensson | 1, 4 |
| | Husqvarna | 984 | (Sweden) Max Wik | 1–5 |
| | Husqvarna | 1166 | (Sweden) Theo Månsson | 4 |
| | Triumph | 1168 | (Sweden) Robin Sundell | 6 |
| Motorspeed.no | KTM | 1189 | (Norway) Markus Sommerstad | 1 |
| | Fantic | 1245 | (Sweden) Albin Liljeblad | 5 |
| | Kawasaki | 1268 | (Sweden) Dennis Lindqvist | 6 |
| Dream Team | KTM | 1441 | (Norway) Jakob Kjellberg | 1 |

=== Riders Championship ===
Points are awarded to finishers of the main races, in the following format:

| Place | 1 | 2 | 3 | 4 | 5 | 6 | 7 | 8 | 9 | 10 | 11 | 12 | 13 | 14 | 15 | 16 | 17 | 18 | 19 | 20 | 21 | 22 | 23 | 24 | 25 | 26 | 27 | 28 | 29 | 30 | 31 | 32 | 33 | 34 | 35 | 36 | 37 | 38 | 39 | 40 |
|---|---|---|---|---|---|---|---|---|---|---|---|---|---|---|---|---|---|---|---|---|---|---|---|---|---|---|---|---|---|---|---|---|---|---|---|---|---|---|---|---|
| | 45 | 42 | 40 | 38 | 36 | 35 | 34 | 33 | 32 | 31 | 30 | 29 | 28 | 27 | 26 | 25 | 24 | 23 | 22 | 21 | 20 | 19 | 18 | 17 | 16 | 15 | 14 | 13 | 12 | 11 | 10 | 9 | 8 | 7 | 6 | 5 | 4 | 3 | 2 | 1 |

| Pos | Rider | Bike | LAN (Scania) | | | LIN (Östergötland) | | | TIB (Västergötland) | | VAR (Halland) | | ULR (Västergötland) | | | ENK (Uppland) | | UDD (Bohuslän) | | Points |
|---|---|---|---|---|---|---|---|---|---|---|---|---|---|---|---|---|---|---|---|---|
| 1 | (Sweden) Alvin Östlund | Triumph | 1 | 1 | 2 | 1 | 4 | 3 | 1 | 2 | 4 | 2 | 2 | 1 | 1 | 1 | 1 | 1 | 1 | 734 |
| 2 | (Sweden) Albin Gerhardsson | Yamaha | 2 | 2 | 3 | 4 | 3 | 7 | 6 | 3 | 3 | 3 | 3 | 2 | 2 | 3 | 3 | 15 | 9 | 653 |
| 3 | (Sweden) Ken Bengtson | KTM | 3 | 5 | 7 | 7 | 5 | 8 | 3 | 4 | 1 | 4 | 4 | 4 | 4 | 8 | 6 | 18 | 3 | 619 |
| 4 | (Sweden) Max Pålsson | Yamaha | 12 | 9 | 12 | 11 | 7 | 6 | 12 | 7 | 8 | 9 | 5 | 7 | 3 | 4 | 9 | 3 | 2 | 579 |
| 5 | (Sweden) Emil Jönrup | KTM | 7 | 11 | 9 | 12 | 12 | 12 | 4 | 5 | 6 | 10 | 9 | 9 | 9 | 5 | 10 | 38 | 8 | 522 |
| 6 | (Sweden) Anton Neidert | Yamaha | 9 | 38 | 8 | 14 | 14 | 11 | 10 | 9 | 13 | 7 | 6 | 5 | 5 | 12 | 11 | 10 | 15 | 500 |
| 7 | (Sweden) Arvid Lüning | Husqvarna | 11 | 14 | 12 | 31 | 11 | 9 | 8 | 12 | 16 | 21 | 8 | 6 | 12 | 14 | 5 | 4 | 26 | 478 |
| 8 | (Sweden) Rasmus Varg | Husqvarna | 14 | 15 | 35 | 10 | 9 | 13 | 15 | 13 | 14 | 12 | 16 | 15 | 10 | 11 | 4 | 9 | 5 | 478 |
| 9 | (Sweden) Anton Gole | Yamaha | 38 | 3 | 4 | 3 | 1 | 4 | 2 | 1 | 2 | 1 | 1 | 3 | DNS | | | | | 463 |
| 10 | (Sweden) Rasmus Moen | Triumph | 18 | 17 | 17 | 16 | 19 | 16 | 24 | 14 | 17 | 13 | 21 | 16 | 13 | 13 | 14 | 8 | 7 | 434 |
| 11 | (Sweden) Olle Mårtensson | Kawasaki | 13 | 10 | 11 | 9 | 13 | 10 | 13 | 8 | 7 | 37 | 10 | 33 | 30 | 38 | 12 | 2 | 14 | 430 |
| 12 | (Sweden) Danne Karlsson | KTM | 5 | 7 | 15 | 2 | 2 | 1 | 5 | 36 | | | | | | 2 | 2 | 7 | 6 | 419 |
| 13 | (Sweden) André Högberg | Triumph | 4 | 4 | 6 | | | | | | 11 | 6 | 7 | 8 | 6 | 9 | 7 | 6 | 4 | 417 |
| 14 | (Sweden) Jakob Zetterholm | Husqvarna | 10 | 14 | 13 | 5 | 8 | 5 | 9 | 6 | 10 | 8 | 13 | 11 | 15 | | | | | 406 |
| 15 | (Sweden) Filip Olsson | Honda | 8 | 6 | 10 | 8 | 17 | 20 | | | 5 | 5 | 12 | 34 | DNS | 10 | 38 | 5 | 10 | 386 |
| 16 | (Sweden) Alfons Stensson | KTM | 17 | 25 | 23 | 18 | 18 | 14 | 11 | 11 | 12 | 15 | 14 | 18 | 35 | 16 | 16 | | | 352 |
| 17 | (Sweden) Sebastian Santana Johansson | Ducati | 21 | 22 | 22 | 29 | 20 | 29 | 20 | 21 | 20 | 16 | 25 | 13 | 17 | 23 | 21 | 26 | 24 | 328 |
| 18 | (Sweden) Jesper Hansson | Triumph | 16 | 16 | 16 | 28 | 27 | 27 | 18 | 20 | 24 | 19 | 19 | 14 | DNS | 21 | 22 | 19 | 25 | 325 |
| 19 | (Sweden) Liam Åkerlund | Triumph | DNQ | DNQ | DNQ | 27 | 16 | 19 | 14 | 29 | 39 | 14 | 39 | 17 | 16 | 15 | 15 | 11 | 31 | 272 |
| 20 | (Sweden) Rasmus Svanborg | Husqvarna | 20 | 27 | 25 | DNQ | DNQ | DNQ | 23 | 25 | 19 | 26 | 17 | 19 | 11 | 20 | 29 | 24 | 33 | 256 |
| 21 | (Sweden) Linus Grelsson | Honda | 24 | 18 | 20 | 15 | 15 | 15 | | | | | | | | 17 | 17 | 12 | 13 | 244 |
| 22 | (Sweden) Eddie Hjortmarker | Kawasaki | 39 | DNS | DNS | 20 | 22 | 17 | 30 | 17 | 15 | 11 | | | | 7 | 8 | | | 224 |
| 23 | (Norway) Håkon Østerhagen | Husqvarna | 6 | 13 | 5 | 19 | 6 | 2 | Ret | DNS | | | | | | | | | | 198 |
| 24 | (Sweden) Algot Johansson | Ducati | 40 | 28 | 27 | 22 | 25 | 25 | 7 | 16 | 9 | 18 | 38 | DNS | DNS | | | | | 196 |
| 25 | (Sweden) Neo Svensson | Yamaha | 23 | 23 | 30 | 13 | 24 | 21 | DNQ | DNQ | | | 24 | 22 | 31 | 27 | 20 | | | 193 |
| 26 | (Norway) Martin Bredesen | Husqvarna | 19 | 24 | 19 | 40 | 39 | 22 | 28 | 15 | | | 15 | 37 | 14 | | | | | 179 |
| 27 | (Sweden) Hampus Lindgren | KTM | 28 | 29 | 26 | 39 | 26 | 28 | 32 | 22 | | | 40 | 30 | 29 | 34 | 25 | 25 | 32 | 170 |
| 28 | (Sweden) Benjamin Löwenhaft | Husqvarna | DNQ | DNQ | 28 | 24 | 23 | 26 | 22 | 37 | 33 | 24 | | | | | | 16 | 19 | 128 |
| 29 | (Sweden) Oskar Olsson | KTM | | | | | | | | | | | 11 | 10 | 7 | 6 | 18 | DNS | DNS | 153 |
| 30 | (Sweden) Hugo Johansson | Yamaha | | | | | | | | | 18 | 20 | | | | 18 | 13 | 17 | 12 | 148 |
| 31 | (Sweden) Anton Forsgård | Honda | 31 | 36 | 33 | 34 | 35 | 35 | 27 | 40 | 37 | 35 | 34 | 27 | 23 | DNQ | DNQ | 32 | 17 | 139 |
| 32 | (Sweden) Teo Törnell | Kawasaki | 30 | 34 | 31 | DNQ | DNQ | DNQ | 25 | 27 | 32 | 34 | 28 | 21 | DNS | 25 | 31 | | | 133 |
| 33 | (Sweden) Adam Einarsson | Honda | | | | 6 | 10 | 18 | | | | | | | | | | 13 | 35 | 123 |
| 34 | (Sweden) Tim Eriksson | Yamaha | | | | | | | | | | | 18 | 28 | 34 | 26 | 23 | 21 | 18 | 119 |
| 35 | (Sweden) Eddie Lind | Honda | 32 | 33 | 34 | | | | 33 | 30 | DNQ | DNQ | DNQ | 31 | 21 | 30 | 37 | 30 | 21 | 119 |
| 36 | (Sweden) Viking Lindström | Kawasaki | 15 | 8 | 40 | | | | | | | | | | | | | 14 | 11 | 117 |
| 37 | (Sweden) Albin Werkander | KTM | DNQ | 30 | 37 | 36 | 34 | 39 | DNQ | DNQ | 35 | 32 | 27 | 23 | 26 | 35 | 40 | 36 | 27 | 117 |
| 38 | (Sweden) Carl Bååv | Yamaha | 22 | 21 | 39 | DNQ | DNQ | DNQ | 38 | 23 | 26 | 23 | 23 | DNS | DNS | | | | | 113 |
| 39 | (Sweden) Jacob Norrman | Gas Gas | | | | 37 | 37 | 31 | 17 | 18 | 27 | 39 | | | | DNQ | 32 | 20 | DNS | 111 |
| 40 | (Sweden) Axel Hansson | KTM | | | | DNQ | DNQ | DNQ | DNQ | DNQ | 31 | 36 | 29 | 26 | 22 | 29 | 36 | 37 | 23 | 100 |
| 41 | (Sweden) Melvin Bladh | Yamaha | | | | | | | 21 | 19 | 40 | 22 | 35 | 35 | 18 | | | | | 97 |
| 42 | (Sweden) Max Huvell | Honda | | | | DNQ | DNQ | 40 | DNQ | DNQ | 22 | 31 | DNQ | DNQ | DNQ | 28 | 27 | 29 | 20 | 90 |
| 43 | (Sweden) Niklas Rohdin | KTM | | | | | | | | | DNQ | 29 | 26 | 20 | 32 | | | 28 | 22 | 89 |
| 44 | (Sweden) Sebastian Andersson | Suzuki | DNQ | DNQ | DNQ | DNQ | DNQ | DNQ | 35 | 26 | | | 31 | 38 | 24 | 32 | 30 | 23 | DNS | 89 |
| 45 | (Sweden) Victor Fahlén | KTM | | | | | | | | | | | 20 | 12 | 8 | | | | | 83 |
| 46 | (Sweden) Filip Bank | Husqvarna | | | | 23 | 38 | 24 | | | 21 | 17 | | | | | | | | 82 |
| 47 | (Sweden) Marco Kristensson | KTM | 26 | 26 | 21 | | | | | | 29 | 30 | | | | | | | | 73 |
| 48 | (Sweden) Eric Andersson | Yamaha | DNQ | DNQ | DNQ | 33 | 31 | 33 | | | | | | | | 33 | 28 | 22 | 34 | 73 |
| 49 | (Sweden) Kewin Palmér | Husqvarna | DNQ | DNQ | 29 | 30 | 29 | 30 | 31 | 24 | DNQ | DNQ | DNQ | DNQ | DNQ | | | | | 73 |
| 50 | (Sweden) John Cagner | Yamaha | | | | | | | | | | | 33 | 29 | 28 | | | 27 | 16 | 72 |
| 51 | (Sweden) Kim Larsson | KTM | DNQ | DNQ | DNQ | 38 | 28 | 32 | | | 25 | 33 | | | | 31 | 34 | | | 66 |
| 52 | (Sweden) Algot Hjalmarsson | Husqvarna | DNQ | DNQ | DNQ | DNQ | DNQ | DNQ | | | | | 30 | 25 | 25 | | | 31 | 29 | 65 |
| 53 | (Sweden) David Kadestam | KTM | | | | 17 | 21 | 23 | | | | | | | | | | | | 62 |
| 54 | (Sweden) Per Nyberg | Yamaha | 25 | 19 | 18 | | | | | | | | | | | | | | | 61 |
| 55 | (Sweden) Ludwig Hellberg Isaksson | Yamaha | | | | 26 | 40 | DNS | 34 | 28 | 28 | 38 | 36 | DNS | DNS | | | | | 57 |
| 56 | (Norway) Sander Agard-Michelsen | Yamaha | | | | | | | 16 | 10 | | | | | | | | | | 56 |
| 57 | (Sweden) Felix Ottosson | Honda | 29 | 31 | 32 | | | | | | 30 | 27 | | | | | | | | 56 |
| 58 | (Norway) Håkon Fredriksen | Yamaha | 36 | 37 | 1 | | | | | | | | | | | | | | | 54 |
| 59 | (Sweden) Edvin Hagman | Honda | 27 | 20 | 24 | | | | | | | | | | | | | | | 52 |
| 60 | (Sweden) Max Wik | Husqvarna | DNQ | DNQ | DNQ | DNQ | DNQ | DNQ | DNQ | DNQ | 36 | 28 | 32 | 39 | 20 | | | | | 50 |
| 61 | (Sweden) Fredrik Theorell | Gas Gas | | | | | | | | | | | | | | 19 | 19 | | | 44 |
| 62 | (Sweden) Simon Löfdahl | Husqvarna | | | | | | | DNQ | DNQ | | | DNQ | 24 | 19 | | | | | 39 |
| 63 | (Sweden) Isaac Bohrén | Honda | | | | | | | DNQ | DNQ | DNQ | DNQ | DNQ | 32 | 33 | DNQ | DNQ | 34 | 28 | 37 |
| 64 | (Sweden) Sixten Davidsson | TM | | | | | | | | | | | | | | 22 | 26 | | | 34 |
| 65 | (Sweden) Anton Nilsson | Honda | | | | | | | | | 23 | 25 | | | | | | | | 34 |
| 66 | (Sweden) Robin Sundell | Triumph | | | | | | | | | | | | | | 24 | 24 | | | 34 |
| 67 | (Sweden) Stefan Olsson | Kawasaki | | | | 21 | 33 | DNS | | | | | | | | 39 | DNS | | | 30 |
| 68 | (Sweden) Pelle Gabrielsson Tell | Husqvarna | | | | 25 | 30 | 38 | DNQ | DNQ | | | | | | | | | | 30 |
| 69 | (Sweden) Milton Sandström | Kawasaki | | | | | | | | | | | 22 | 36 | 36 | DNQ | DNQ | | | 29 |
| 70 | (Sweden) Lukas Into | Husqvarna | | | | | | | DNQ | 33 | | | | | | | | 33 | 30 | 27 |
| 71 | (Sweden) Jesper Gangfors | KTM | | | | | | | 19 | 38 | | | | | | | | | | 25 |
| 72 | (Sweden) Pontus Lindblad | Yamaha | | | | DNQ | DNQ | DNQ | 29 | 31 | | | | | | 40 | 39 | | | 25 |
| 73 | (Sweden) Måns Eriksson Oldenburg | KTM | DNQ | DNQ | DNQ | 32 | 32 | 37 | | | | | | | | DNQ | DNQ | | | 22 |
| 74 | (Sweden) Axel Nilsson | Honda | 33 | 32 | 38 | | | | | | | | | | | | | | | 20 |
| 75 | (Sweden) Robin Ember | Yamaha | | | | 35 | 36 | 34 | | | | | | | | | | | | 18 |
| 76 | (Sweden) Nicolas Skoglund | KTM | | | | | | | 26 | 39 | | | | | | | | | | 17 |
| 77 | (Sweden) Axel Isgren | Kawasaki | 35 | 35 | 36 | | | | | | | | | | | | | | | 17 |
| 78 | (Sweden) David Krantz | KTM | | | | DNQ | DNQ | 36 | DNQ | DNQ | | | | | | 37 | 35 | | | 15 |
| 79 | (Sweden) Elis Wahlman | Kawasaki | | | | | | | | | DNQ | DNQ | DNQ | DNQ | 27 | DNQ | DNQ | | | 14 |
| 80 | (Sweden) Emils Kärklins | KTM | | | | | | | 37 | 32 | | | | | | | | | | 13 |
| 81 | (Sweden) Olle Sundberg | Husqvarna | | | | | | | | | | | | | | 36 | 33 | | | 13 |
| 82 | (Sweden) Oscar Rooth | Husqvarna | | | | | | | 36 | 34 | | | | | | | | | | 12 |
| 83 | (Sweden) Elias Thor | Kove | | | | DNQ | DNQ | DNQ | DNQ | DNQ | 34 | 40 | | | | DNQ | DNQ | | | 8 |
| 84 | (Sweden) Arvid Bodin | Husqvarna | 34 | 40 | DNS | | | | | | | | | | | | | | | 8 |
| 85 | (Sweden) Arvid Stjärnås | Kawasaki | | | | | | | | | | | | | | DNQ | DNQ | 35 | DNS | 6 |
| 86 | (Sweden) Zebastian Wennerlund | Husqvarna | | | | DNQ | DNQ | DNQ | DNQ | 35 | DNQ | DNQ | DNQ | DNQ | DNQ | | | | | 6 |
| 87 | (Norway) Markus Sommerstad | KTM | 37 | 39 | DNS | | | | | | | | | | | | | | | 6 |
| 88 | (Sweden) Henning Hollertz | KTM | | | | | | | | | | | 37 | DNS | DNS | | | | | 4 |
| 89 | (Sweden) Linus Persson | Ducati | | | | | | | | | 38 | DNS | | | | | | | | 4 |
| 90 | (Sweden) Jonathan Jogér | KTM | | | | | | | 39 | DNS | | | | | | | | | | 2 |
| 91 | (Sweden) William Berg | Beta | | | | | | | | | DNQ | DNQ | DNQ | 40 | DNS | | | | | 1 |
| | (Sweden) Lucas Appel | Yamaha | | | | DNQ | DNQ | DNQ | DNQ | DNQ | DNQ | DNQ | | | | DNQ | DNQ | | | 0 |
| | (Sweden) Pontus Fredman | KTM | | | | DNQ | DNQ | DNQ | DNQ | DNQ | DNQ | DNQ | | | | | | | | 0 |
| | (Sweden) Liam Dafors | Honda | | | | DNQ | DNQ | DNQ | DNQ | DNQ | | | | | | DNQ | DNQ | | | 0 |
| | (Sweden) Christoffer Niklus | Fantic | | | | DNQ | DNQ | DNQ | | | DNQ | DNQ | | | | DNQ | DNQ | | | 0 |
| | (Sweden) Emil Gustavsson | KTM | | | | DNQ | DNQ | DNQ | | | | | DNQ | DNQ | DNQ | | | | | 0 |
| | (Sweden) Hugo Schmidt | Husqvarna | | | | DNQ | DNQ | DNQ | DNQ | DNQ | | | | | | | | | | 0 |
| | (Sweden) Simon Olsson | KTM | | | | DNQ | DNQ | DNQ | DNQ | DNQ | | | | | | | | | | 0 |
| | (Sweden) Fredrik Rask | Kawasaki | | | | | | | DNQ | DNQ | DNQ | DNQ | | | | | | | | 0 |
| | (Sweden) Viggo Rönnings | KTM | | | | | | | | | DNQ | DNQ | | | | DNQ | DNQ | | | 0 |
| | (Sweden) Eddie Lind | KTM | DNQ | DNQ | DNQ | | | | | | | | | | | | | | | 0 |
| | (Sweden) Ludwig Berggren | KTM | DNQ | DNQ | DNQ | | | | | | | | | | | | | | | 0 |
| | (Sweden) Tobias Arvidsson | Ducati | DNQ | DNQ | DNQ | | | | | | | | | | | | | | | 0 |
| | (Norway) Jakob Kjellberg | KTM | DNQ | DNQ | DNQ | | | | | | | | | | | | | | | 0 |
| | (Sweden) Marcus Eriksson Garms | KTM | | | | DNQ | DNQ | DNQ | | | | | | | | | | | | 0 |
| | (Sweden) Oliver Magnusson | Kawasaki | | | | | | | | | | | DNQ | DNQ | DNQ | | | | | 0 |
| | (Sweden) Markus Tivenäs | Yamaha | | | | | | | | | | | DNQ | DNQ | DNQ | | | | | 0 |
| | (Sweden) Pontus Sköld | Husqvarna | | | | | | | | | | | DNQ | DNQ | DNQ | | | | | 0 |
| | (Sweden) Albin Liljeblad | Fantic | | | | | | | | | | | DNQ | DNQ | DNQ | | | | | 0 |
| | (Sweden) Joel Hennerfors | Husqvarna | | | | | | | DNQ | DNQ | | | | | | | | | | 0 |
| | (Sweden) Valter Åkesson | Honda | | | | | | | | | DNQ | DNQ | | | | | | | | 0 |
| | (Sweden) Theo Månsson | Husqvarna | | | | | | | | | DNQ | DNQ | | | | | | | | 0 |
| | (Sweden) Dennis Lindqvist | Kawasaki | | | | | | | | | | | | | | DNQ | DNQ | | | 0 |
| | (Sweden) Rasmus Wikström | KTM | | | | | | | | | | | | | | DNQ | DNQ | | | 0 |
| | (Sweden) Isak Olsson | KTM | | | | | | | | | | | | | | DNQ | DNQ | | | 0 |
| | (Sweden) Joel Hammarström | Husqvarna | | | | | | | | | | | | | | DNQ | DNQ | | | 0 |
| Pos | Rider | Bike | LAN (Scania) | | | LIN (Östergötland) | | | TIB (Västergötland) | | VAR (Halland) | | ULR (Västergötland) | | | ENK (Uppland) | | UDD (Bohuslän) | | Points |

== MX2 ==
=== Participants ===
| Team | Constructor | No | Rider | Rounds |
|---|---|---|---|---|
| Triumph Racing Nordics | Triumph | 4 | (Sweden) Nike Korsbeck | All |
| Triumph Racing Nordics | Triumph | 320 | (Sweden) Sebastian Sundman | 2–7 |
| Wozniak MX Racing Team | Yamaha | 5 | (Denmark) Magnus Smith | 7 |
| Wozniak MX Racing Team | Yamaha | 611 | (Sweden) Gustav Johnsson | 1–2, 5 |
| Bloms MX Racing | Husqvarna | 7 | (Sweden) Otto Gustavsson | All |
| Bloms MX Racing | KTM | 33 | (Sweden) Loke Danielsson | All |
| Bloms MX Racing | Husqvarna | 745 | (Sweden) Oscar Lindskog | All |
| Husqvarna Scandinavia | Husqvarna | 12 | (Norway) Pelle Gundersen | All |
| Husqvarna Scandinavia | Husqvarna | 496 | (Sweden) Alve Callemo | All |
| Husqvarna Scandinavia | Husqvarna | 540 | (Sweden) Axel Semb | 7 |
| Husqvarna Scandinavia | Husqvarna | 1126 | (Sweden) Matilda Huss | 4 |
| BRS Racing Team | Fantic | 13 | (Sweden) Adam Fridlund | All |
| BRS Racing Team | Fantic | 531 | (Sweden) Hugo Bergqvist | 1–4 |
| | KTM | 16 | (Sweden) Oskar Olsson | 1–4 |
| | Triumph | 26 | (Sweden) Tim Edberg | 3 |
| TwentyNineRacing | KTM | 29 | (Norway) Sander Agard-Michelsen | 5 |
| CEC Racing | Husqvarna | 39 | (Sweden) John Cagner | 3–4 |
| CEC Racing | Husqvarna | 257 | (Sweden) William Johansson | 3–4 |
| CEC Racing | KTM | 640 | (Sweden) Elliott Wensund | 6–7 |
| CEC Racing | Husqvarna | 884 | (Sweden) Casper Lindmark | 3–7 |
| CEC Racing | Husqvarna | 942 | (Sweden) Samuel Krafft Wingård | All |
| Team MP Racing Shop | Honda | 55 | (Sweden) Tim Millberg | 4 |
| Frisk Suspension by Toftén | KTM | 64 | (Sweden) Edvin Olstrand | 1–2 |
| | Kawasaki | 70 | (Sweden) Alex Takkunen | 2, 6 |
| | KTM | 89 | (Sweden) Marcus Göthenberg | 1, 3, 5 |
| | Yamaha | 90 | (Sweden) Mattias Cöster | 2–7 |
| MB Motocross Team | Husqvarna | 97 | (Norway) Edvard Hestvik | All |
| Kawasaki Sverige/Motul | Kawasaki | 132 | (Sweden) Ceasar Karlsson | 1–3 |
| Ronnangsgard Racing | Yamaha | 163 | (Sweden) Erik Frisagård | 1–5, 7 |
| MXestore Europe | Kawasaki | 179 | (Sweden) Anton Vegehall | 1, 3 |
| | KTM | 199 | (Sweden) Andreas Svensson | 4–5 |
| | Yamaha | 207 | (Sweden) Lukas Engerstad | 5 |
| Team Norway MX | Honda | 232 | (Norway) Leander Bech-Thunshelle | 1–5, 7 |
| Team Norway MX | Honda | 811 | (Norway) Theo Hansen | All |
| Team Norway MX | Husqvarna | 1175 | (Norway) Theodor Imenes | All |
| Team Karlströms Motor | Husqvarna | 238 | (Sweden) Viktor Andersson | 1, 3 |
| Team Karlströms Motor | Husqvarna | 242 | (Sweden) Kevin Flodberg | 2–3, 6 |
| Team Karlströms Motor | KTM | 926 | (Sweden) Erik Axelsson | 6 |
| | Suzuki | 281 | (Sweden) Victor Andersson | 2–7 |
| Team Keva Motor AB | Husqvarna | 255 | (Sweden) Victor Strömberg | 1, 4–5 |
| Nilssons Motor | Kawasaki | 310 | (Sweden) Dennis Fredman | 1–4 |
| Team MC Konsult | Triumph | 349 | (Sweden) William Lidnert | 3 |
| | Husqvarna | 368 | (Sweden) Noah Nyström | 1 |
| | Honda | 372 | (Sweden) Valter Åkesson | 6 |
| MC Sport Racing Team | Gas Gas | 380 | (Sweden) Alfred Franzén | 1–3, 6–7 |
| MC Sport Racing Team | Gas Gas | 480 | (Finland) Kasimir Hindersson | All |
| Speedequipment Racing | Honda | 383 | (Sweden) Max Bodingh | 2–4 |
| Speedequipment Racing | KTM | 785 | (Sweden) Albin Karlsson | 5–7 |
| | Triumph | 388 | (Sweden) Elliot Wigforss | 1–3, 6–7 |
| JWR Honda MX Team Sweden | Honda | 422 | (Sweden) Hugo Forsgren | 1–4, 6 |
| JWR Honda MX Team Sweden | Honda | 555 | (Sweden) Noel Nilsson | 1–5 |
| Team ATV Racing | Yamaha | 424 | (Sweden) Alvin Lundbäck | 2, 6 |
| Team ATV Racing | Yamaha | 981 | (Sweden) Gustav Axelsson | All |
| Northbike | KTM | 430 | (Sweden) Aron Norbäck | 1–2, 4, 7 |
| OC1 Racing Team | Husqvarna | 437 | (Sweden) David Floria | 2, 4, 6–7 |
| Motostar Racing | Yamaha | 454 | (Sweden) Liam Hanström | 1–3 |
| Motostar Racing | Triumph | 562 | (Sweden) Casper Borg | 3 |
| | Honda | 459 | (Sweden) William Bäckström | 3–5 |
| JE68 Racing Team | KTM | 464 | (Sweden) Jakob Albrekt | All |
| JE68 Racing Team | KTM | 475 | (Sweden) Fabian Nilsson | 1–2 |
| | Yamaha | 490 | (Sweden) Emil Blommesköld | 1, 5 |
| | Husqvarna | 495 | (Sweden) Loke Callemo | 1–4, 6 |
| | Husqvarna | 543 | (Sweden) Laban Alm | All |
| Power by JJ Racing Team | KTM | 553 | (Sweden) John Karleyel | All |
| Power by JJ Racing Team | KTM | 1221 | (Norway) Marius Nordbø | 2 |
| | Yamaha | 563 | (Sweden) Anton Klingberg | 6 |
| Göthenberg Transport AB | KTM | 589 | (Sweden) Benjamin Göthenberg | 1–3, 5–6 |
| | KTM | 602 | (Sweden) Felix Munoz Boberg | All |
| | Triumph | 632 | (Sweden) Nils Ruth | 3–6 |
| | Honda | 644 | (Sweden) Albin Kolberg | 1–4, 6–7 |
| | Husqvarna | 656 | (Sweden) Alfred Wiklund | 1–2, 5 |
| Stub Racing/Kaduuz MX Store | Husqvarna | 725 | (Denmark) Jonas Stub Buch | All |
| Marin & Fritid Racing Team | Husqvarna | 743 | (Sweden) Filip Hagdahl | 1–5 |
| Big Balls MX | KTM | 772 | (Sweden) Lukas Falkbrink | 1–5, 7 |
| | Yamaha | 789 | (Sweden) Hugo Färjevall | 3, 5–7 |
| | Husqvarna | 818 | (Sweden) Emil Gustavsson | 6 |
| | KTM | 820 | (Sweden) William Hjalmarsson | 6 |
| | Yamaha | 828 | (Sweden) Tobias Fält | 1 |
| | Kawasaki | 877 | (Sweden) Max Karlsson | 4–5 |
| | KTM | 895 | (Sweden) Isac Nilsson | 2–7 |
| | KTM | 907 | (Sweden) Anton Nilsson | 1–3 |
| KTM Scandinavia | KTM | 920 | (Sweden) Sandro Sols | 1–5 |
| | KTM | 927 | (Sweden) Melker Björk | 1–4, 6 |
| | KTM | 929 | (Sweden) Milo Brännström | 2–3, 5–7 |
| Westside Racing | Husqvarna | 939 | (Denmark) Emil Lodal | 1–2 |
| | Yamaha | 1124 | (Sweden) Sebastian Johansson | 6 |
| | Husqvarna | 1381 | (Norway) Dag Lucas Odongo | 4 |
| | Husqvarna | 1421 | (Sweden) Lukas Svallin | All |
| | Honda | 1483 | (Norway) Andre Marthinsen | 4 |

=== Riders Championship ===
Points are awarded to finishers of the main races, in the following format:

| Place | 1 | 2 | 3 | 4 | 5 | 6 | 7 | 8 | 9 | 10 | 11 | 12 | 13 | 14 | 15 | 16 | 17 | 18 | 19 | 20 | 21 | 22 | 23 | 24 | 25 | 26 | 27 | 28 | 29 | 30 | 31 | 32 | 33 | 34 | 35 | 36 | 37 | 38 | 39 | 40 |
|---|---|---|---|---|---|---|---|---|---|---|---|---|---|---|---|---|---|---|---|---|---|---|---|---|---|---|---|---|---|---|---|---|---|---|---|---|---|---|---|---|
| | 45 | 42 | 40 | 38 | 36 | 35 | 34 | 33 | 32 | 31 | 30 | 29 | 28 | 27 | 26 | 25 | 24 | 23 | 22 | 21 | 20 | 19 | 18 | 17 | 16 | 15 | 14 | 13 | 12 | 11 | 10 | 9 | 8 | 7 | 6 | 5 | 4 | 3 | 2 | 1 |

| Pos | Rider | Bike | LAN (Scania) | | | LIN (Östergötland) | | | TIB (Västergötland) | | VAR (Halland) | | ULR (Västergötland) | | | ENK (Uppland) | | UDD (Bohuslän) | | Points |
|---|---|---|---|---|---|---|---|---|---|---|---|---|---|---|---|---|---|---|---|---|
| 1 | (Sweden) Alve Callemo | Husqvarna | 5 | 3 | 3 | 1 | 1 | 1 | 6 | 3 | 12 | 3 | 1 | 2 | 2 | 2 | 1 | 1 | 1 | 701 |
| 2 | (Norway) Pelle Gundersen | Husqvarna | 1 | 4 | 2 | 5 | 4 | 3 | 1 | 4 | 1 | 5 | 3 | 1 | 1 | 3 | 2 | 7 | 3 | 689 |
| 3 | (Sweden) Nike Korsbeck | Triumph | 36 | 12 | 10 | 3 | 6 | 2 | 2 | 1 | 6 | 8 | 5 | 5 | 29 | 4 | 4 | 3 | 6 | 572 |
| 4 | (Finland) Kasimir Hindersson | Gas Gas | 2 | 2 | 1 | 2 | 5 | 4 | 5 | 18 | 4 | 1 | 2 | 14 | 40 | 10 | 5 | 36 | 25 | 545 |
| 5 | (Sweden) Otto Gustavsson | Husqvarna | 18 | 13 | 17 | 17 | 19 | 8 | 17 | 8 | 13 | 10 | 14 | 10 | 10 | 8 | 8 | 9 | 12 | 486 |
| 6 | (Sweden) Adam Fridlund | Fantic | 14 | 14 | 13 | 8 | 9 | 11 | 4 | 39 | 8 | 6 | 18 | 12 | 16 | 12 | 14 | 10 | 10 | 480 |
| 7 | (Sweden) Laban Alm | Husqvarna | 7 | 9 | 4 | 16 | DNS | DNS | 15 | 37 | 5 | 4 | 7 | 7 | 4 | 1 | 3 | 8 | 22 | 476 |
| 8 | (Sweden) Hugo Forsgren | Honda | 3 | 1 | 6 | 6 | 2 | 7 | 37 | 2 | 3 | 37 | 4 | 4 | 5 | 6 | 39 | | | 470 |
| 9 | (Sweden) John Karleyel | KTM | 9 | 11 | 9 | 12 | 12 | 19 | 16 | 15 | 10 | 13 | 15 | 9 | 8 | 15 | 22 | 19 | 15 | 468 |
| 10 | (Sweden) Gustav Axelsson | Yamaha | 6 | 6 | 5 | 37 | 11 | 16 | 36 | 10 | 14 | 21 | 11 | 18 | 13 | 9 | 10 | 4 | 31 | 440 |
| 11 | (Sweden) Sebastian Sundman | Triumph | | | | 11 | 7 | 10 | 18 | 13 | 15 | 12 | 9 | 15 | 14 | 7 | 6 | 13 | 7 | 417 |
| 12 | (Sweden) Noel Nilsson | Honda | 8 | 8 | 11 | 4 | 38 | 6 | 9 | 5 | 2 | 2 | 19 | 13 | 11 | | | | | 404 |
| 13 | (Sweden) Sandro Sols | KTM | 4 | 5 | 8 | 15 | 3 | 5 | 38 | 7 | 9 | 18 | 13 | 6 | 3 | | | | | 404 |
| 14 | (Sweden) Erik Frisagård | Yamaha | 13 | 7 | 7 | 10 | 10 | 9 | 8 | 12 | 7 | 9 | 8 | 38 | 15 | | | 29 | DNS | 392 |
| 15 | (Norway) Theo Hansen | Honda | 11 | 20 | 15 | 29 | 27 | 37 | 22 | 24 | 19 | 15 | 20 | 11 | 12 | 13 | 16 | 17 | 8 | 381 |
| 16 | (Sweden) Isac Nilsson | KTM | | | | 22 | 16 | 18 | 12 | 11 | 25 | 14 | 22 | 17 | 18 | 16 | 9 | 22 | 11 | 341 |
| 17 | (Norway) Edvard Hestvik | Husqvarna | 17 | 35 | 33 | Ret | 29 | 13 | 14 | 23 | 20 | 40 | 16 | 16 | 36 | 21 | 13 | 14 | 9 | 307 |
| 18 | (Sweden) Oscar Lindskog | Husqvarna | 27 | 22 | 25 | 13 | 22 | 22 | 20 | 25 | 22 | 17 | 26 | 35 | 17 | 14 | 21 | 33 | DNS | 295 |
| 19 | (Sweden) Jakob Albrekt | KTM | 24 | 25 | 24 | DNQ | DNQ | DNQ | 24 | 22 | 21 | 16 | 17 | 23 | 19 | 20 | 18 | 20 | 14 | 287 |
| 20 | (Sweden) Lukas Falkbrink | KTM | 20 | 23 | 30 | 7 | 24 | 21 | 28 | 17 | 27 | 22 | 31 | 19 | 20 | | | 11 | 33 | 282 |
| 21 | (Norway) Leander Bech-Thunshelle | Honda | 15 | 19 | 20 | 35 | DNS | DNS | 10 | 20 | 17 | 11 | 21 | 24 | 34 | | | 12 | 13 | 282 |
| 22 | (Denmark) Jonas Stub Buch | Husqvarna | 19 | 31 | 28 | 21 | 21 | 25 | 13 | 27 | 24 | DNS | 33 | 21 | 24 | 22 | 17 | 28 | 34 | 268 |
| 23 | (Sweden) Oskar Olsson | KTM | 21 | 10 | 19 | 9 | 8 | 12 | 3 | 16 | 18 | 36 | | | | | | | | 260 |
| 24 | (Sweden) Albin Kolberg | Honda | 29 | 26 | 27 | 26 | 25 | 23 | 23 | 30 | 23 | 19 | | | | 18 | 15 | 16 | 17 | 257 |
| 25 | (Sweden) Casper Lindmark | Husqvarna | | | | | | | 35 | 9 | 38 | 7 | 12 | DNS | 6 | 5 | 35 | 5 | 4 | 255 |
| 26 | (Sweden) Felix Munoz Boberg | KTM | 28 | 29 | 22 | 25 | 18 | 15 | 30 | 21 | DNQ | DNQ | 25 | 30 | 25 | 24 | 12 | 27 | 29 | 255 |
| 27 | (Sweden) Loke Callemo | Husqvarna | 34 | 33 | 21 | 30 | 17 | 14 | 34 | 19 | 11 | 35 | | | | 11 | 7 | | | 226 |
| 28 | (Norway) Theodor Imenes | Husqvarna | 22 | 18 | 16 | DNQ | DNQ | DNQ | 21 | 28 | 28 | 29 | 23 | 22 | 22 | 19 | 20 | DNS | DNS | 224 |
| 29 | (Sweden) Hugo Bergqvist | Fantic | 31 | 24 | 18 | 24 | 13 | 20 | 11 | 14 | 16 | 24 | | | | | | | | 215 |
| 30 | (Sweden) Loke Danielsson | KTM | DNQ | DNQ | 36 | 32 | 31 | 24 | 26 | 29 | 32 | 20 | 24 | 20 | 21 | 23 | 38 | 21 | 28 | 210 |
| 31 | (Sweden) Milo Brännström | KTM | | | | 28 | 15 | 17 | 29 | 31 | | | 30 | 39 | 38 | 17 | 11 | 15 | 27 | 195 |
| 32 | (Sweden) Gustav Johnsson | Yamaha | 10 | 15 | 12 | 34 | DNS | DNS | | | | | 10 | 8 | 9 | | | | | 189 |
| 33 | (Sweden) Lukas Svallin | Husqvarna | 30 | 34 | DNS | 19 | 26 | 27 | 19 | 34 | DNQ | 39 | 29 | 31 | 39 | 25 | 36 | 18 | 32 | 177 |
| 34 | (Sweden) Mattias Cöster | Yamaha | | | | 27 | 33 | 26 | 33 | 33 | 34 | 34 | 35 | 29 | 33 | 35 | 24 | 25 | 18 | 155 |
| 35 | (Sweden) Liam Hanström | Yamaha | 12 | 16 | 14 | 14 | 14 | 35 | 39 | 38 | | | | | | | | | | 146 |
| 36 | (Sweden) Dennis Fredman | Kawasaki | 16 | 21 | 23 | 31 | 23 | 29 | 25 | 26 | 40 | DNS | | | | | | | | 135 |
| 37 | (Sweden) Elliot Wigforss | Triumph | 35 | 32 | 31 | 38 | 20 | 36 | 27 | 36 | | | | | | 36 | 23 | 26 | 30 | 122 |
| 38 | (Norway) Sander Agard-Michelsen | Yamaha | | | | | | | | | | | 6 | 3 | 7 | | | | | 109 |
| 39 | (Sweden) Hugo Färjevall | Yamaha | | | | | | | DNQ | DNQ | | | 37 | 33 | 27 | 28 | 27 | 23 | 19 | 93 |
| 40 | (Sweden) Axel Semb | Husqvarna | | | | | | | | | | | | | | | | 2 | 2 | 84 |
| 41 | (Sweden) Victor Strömberg | Husqvarna | 25 | 38 | 39 | | | | | | 39 | 27 | 27 | 26 | 23 | | | | | 84 |
| 42 | (Sweden) Samuel Krafft Wingård | Husqvarna | DNQ | DNQ | DNQ | DNQ | DNQ | DNQ | DNQ | DNQ | DNQ | DNQ | 38 | 34 | 30 | 27 | 25 | 37 | 21 | 75 |
| 43 | (Sweden) Aron Norbäck | KTM | 33 | 27 | 29 | DNQ | DNQ | DNQ | | | 29 | 38 | | | | | | 34 | 23 | 74 |
| 44 | (Sweden) Benjamin Göthenberg | KTM | DNQ | DNQ | 40 | 23 | 35 | 30 | DNQ | DNQ | | | 34 | 32 | 37 | 30 | 34 | | | 74 |
| 45 | (Sweden) David Floria | Husqvarna | | | | DNQ | DNQ | DNQ | | | 36 | 33 | | | | 39 | 19 | 30 | 16 | 73 |
| 46 | (Denmark) Magnus Smith | Yamaha | | | | | | | | | | | | | | | | 6 | 5 | 71 |
| 47 | (Sweden) Tim Edberg | Triumph | | | | | | | 7 | 6 | | | | | | | | | | 69 |
| 48 | (Sweden) Filip Hagdahl | Husqvarna | DNQ | DNQ | 35 | DNQ | DNQ | DNQ | 31 | 35 | 26 | 23 | 32 | 37 | DNS | | | | | 68 |
| 49 | (Denmark) Emil Lodal | Husqvarna | 26 | 28 | 32 | 33 | 32 | 28 | | | | | | | | | | | | 67 |
| 50 | (Sweden) Marcus Göthenberg | KTM | 40 | 17 | 37 | | | | DNQ | DNQ | | | 28 | 25 | 35 | | | | | 64 |
| 51 | (Sweden) Max Bodingh | Honda | | | | 20 | 34 | 31 | DNQ | DNQ | 31 | 25 | | | | | | | | 64 |
| 52 | (Sweden) Elliott Wensund | KTM | | | | | | | | | | | | | | 29 | 28 | 24 | 20 | 63 |
| 53 | (Sweden) Alfred Franzén | Gas Gas | 39 | 37 | DNS | 39 | 30 | 38 | DNQ | DNQ | | | | | | 38 | 33 | 35 | 24 | 56 |
| 54 | (Sweden) William Bäckström | Honda | | | | | | | DNQ | DNQ | 35 | 26 | 40 | 27 | 26 | | | | | 51 |
| 55 | (Sweden) Anton Nilsson | KTM | 23 | 30 | 26 | DNQ | DNQ | DNQ | DNQ | DNQ | | | | | | | | | | 44 |
| 56 | (Sweden) Albin Karlsson | KTM | | | | | | | | | | | DNQ | 36 | 32 | 32 | 29 | 32 | DNS | 44 |
| 57 | (Sweden) Melker Björk | KTM | DNQ | DNQ | DNQ | DNQ | 28 | 34 | DNQ | DNQ | DNQ | 28 | | | | DNQ | DNQ | | | 33 |
| 58 | (Sweden) Emil Blommesköld | Yamaha | DNQ | DNQ | DNQ | | | | | | | | 36 | 28 | 28 | | | | | 31 |
| 59 | (Sweden) Anton Vegehall | Kawasaki | 32 | 36 | 34 | | | | DNQ | 32 | | | | | | | | | | 30 |
| 60 | (Sweden) Nils Ruth | Triumph | | | | | | | 32 | 40 | DNQ | DNQ | DNQ | DNQ | DNQ | 26 | 40 | | | 26 |
| 61 | (Sweden) Edvin Olstrand | KTM | DNQ | DNQ | DNQ | 18 | 39 | DNS | | | | | | | | | | | | 25 |
| 62 | (Sweden) Victor Andersson | Suzuki | | | | DNQ | DNQ | DNQ | DNQ | DNQ | DNQ | DNQ | DNQ | DNQ | DNQ | DNQ | DNQ | 31 | 26 | 25 |
| 63 | (Sweden) William Johansson | Husqvarna | | | | | | | DNQ | DNQ | 30 | 30 | | | | | | | | 22 |
| 64 | (Sweden) Sebastian Johansson | Yamaha | | | | | | | | | | | | | | 33 | 30 | | | 19 |
| 65 | (Sweden) Erik Axelsson | KTM | | | | | | | | | | | | | | 31 | 32 | | | 19 |
| 66 | (Sweden) Alfred Wiklund | Husqvarna | DNQ | DNQ | DNQ | 36 | 36 | 33 | | | | | DNQ | DNQ | DNQ | | | | | 18 |
| 67 | (Sweden) Anton Klingberg | Yamaha | | | | | | | | | | | | | | 34 | 31 | | | 17 |
| 68 | (Sweden) Andreas Svensson | KTM | | | | | | | | | 33 | 32 | DNQ | DNQ | DNQ | | | | | 17 |
| 69 | (Sweden) Kevin Flodberg | Husqvarna | | | | DNQ | DNQ | DNQ | DNQ | DNQ | | | | | | 40 | 26 | | | 16 |
| 70 | (Norway) Andre Marthinsen | Honda | | | | | | | | | 37 | 31 | | | | | | | | 14 |
| 71 | (Sweden) Ceasar Karlsson | Kawasaki | DNQ | DNQ | DNQ | DNQ | 37 | 32 | DNQ | DNQ | | | | | | | | | | 13 |
| 72 | (Sweden) Max Karlsson | Kawasaki | | | | | | | | | DNQ | DNQ | DNQ | DNQ | 31 | | | | | 10 |
| 73 | (Sweden) Alex Takkunen | Kawasaki | | | | DNQ | DNQ | DNQ | | | | | | | | 37 | 37 | | | 8 |
| 74 | (Sweden) Fabian Nilsson | KTM | 37 | 39 | DNS | DNQ | DNQ | DNQ | | | | | | | | | | | | 6 |
| 75 | (Sweden) Viktor Andersson | Husqvarna | 38 | 40 | DNS | | | | DNQ | DNQ | | | | | | | | | | 4 |
| 76 | (Sweden) Tobias Fält | Yamaha | DNQ | DNQ | 38 | | | | | | | | | | | | | | | 3 |
| 77 | (Sweden) Lukas Engerstad | Yamaha | | | | | | | | | | | 39 | DNS | DNS | | | | | 2 |
| 78 | (Sweden) Casper Borg | Triumph | | | | | | | 40 | DNS | | | | | | | | | | 1 |
| | (Sweden) Albin Lundbäck | Yamaha | | | | DNQ | DNQ | DNQ | | | | | | | | DNQ | DNQ | | | 0 |
| | (Sweden) John Cagner | Husqvarna | | | | | | | DNQ | DNQ | DNQ | DNQ | | | | | | | | 0 |
| | (Sweden) Noah Nyström | Husqvarna | DNQ | DNQ | DNQ | | | | | | | | | | | | | | | 0 |
| | (Norway) Marius Nordbø | KTM | | | | DNQ | DNQ | DNQ | | | | | | | | | | | | 0 |
| | (Sweden) William Lidnert | Triumph | | | | | | | DNQ | DNQ | | | | | | | | | | 0 |
| | (Norway) Dag Lucas Odongo | Husqvarna | | | | | | | | | DNQ | DNQ | | | | | | | | 0 |
| | (Sweden) Matilda Huss | Husqvarna | | | | | | | | | DNQ | DNQ | | | | | | | | 0 |
| | (Sweden) Tim Millberg | Honda | | | | | | | | | DNQ | DNQ | | | | | | | | 0 |
| | (Sweden) Emil Gustavsson | Husqvarna | | | | | | | | | | | | | | DNQ | DNQ | | | 0 |
| | (Sweden) Valter Åkesson | Honda | | | | | | | | | | | | | | DNQ | DNQ | | | 0 |
| | (Sweden) William Hjalmarsson | KTM | | | | | | | | | | | | | | DNQ | DNQ | | | 0 |
| Pos | Rider | Bike | LAN (Scania) | | | LIN (Östergötland) | | | TIB (Västergötland) | | VAR (Halland) | | ULR (Västergötland) | | | ENK (Uppland) | | UDD (Bohuslän) | | Points |
