= Foxhill motocross circuit =

Motocross circuit in Wiltshire, England

Coordinates: 51.537°N 1.673°W

Foxhill motocross circuit is a well-known motocross circuit situated near to the small village of Foxhill, around six miles south east of Swindon, Wiltshire, England.

Established in the late 1980s, the circuit is highly regarded by motocross enthusiasts in the UK. Set in a valley, much of the circuit winds up and down the steep banks of the valley, with a number of large man-made jumps. The circuit is predominantly hard, chalky soil.

== History ==
=== Early history ===
After staging a number of national-level events in the early 1990s, the circuit was soon selected to stage Grand Prix events, regularly staging the British Motocross Grand Prix for the 125cc and 250cc classes.

=== Grand Prix Days ===
The circuit made history in 1995, when the first ever 'double-header' Grand Prix event was staged, with the 125cc and 250cc Grand Prix classes both being held on the same day. This proved a huge success with riders, organisers and fans, with the 'double-header' format now a standard feature of Grand Prix motocross. The day was especially notable for home fans as British rider Paul Malin took a popular home victory in the 125cc class.

Belgian motorcyclist Stefan Everts had a good opinion of the Foxhill circuit, as he took three Grand Prix wins at Foxhill in the 1990s, in 1995, 1996 and 1997. Everts, along with many riders. With the circuit set in a valley, crowds of over 20,000 fans would perch on the hillsides, creating an atmosphere more akin to a football stadium than a motorsports venue.

Grand Prix events were (and still are) often televised live on Eurosport, and at the start of each Grand Prix race a piece of music sampling the opening chords of Hells Bells by AC/DC was played on the TV and also at the circuit on powerful speaker systems. Such was the way that the music added to the occasion, Hells Bells is often seen by UK motocross fans as the de facto theme tune to the circuit.

=== Watershed and Decline ===
1998 was to be watershed year in the history of Foxhill, as the circuit staged a Grand Prix event in May, along with the Motocross des Nations in September. The Grand Prix saw Everts de-throned as the 'King of Foxhill', when French rival Sebastien Tortelli snatched victory in the 250cc class.

However, Everts was to reclaim his 'crown' at the Des Nations event in September. Torrential rain over the weekend turned the circuit into a mudbath, with conditions so bad that many of the world's leading riders, including a young Ricky Carmichael, were struggling like junior riders in the severe mud. So bad were the conditions that in the second race of the day, two-thirds of the elite riders got stuck on one of Foxhill's steep hills, dubbed by the media as 'Heartbreak Hill'. None of this was to bother Everts, who was a class apart as he took two race wins, helping the Belgian team onto victory.

Whilst the Everts masterclass was to go down in motocross folklore, the real talking point was the terrible weather conditions. So bad were the conditions that it was reported that only the prestige and importance of the event meant that it went ahead. The mud caused problems with both riding teams and spectators becoming hopelessly stuck in the muddy fields after the event.

After the Motocross Des Nations event, Foxhill was seemingly cursed by poor weather 1999 saw the Grand Prix once again return to Foxhill, with the circuit completely renovated and rebuilt. Saturday evening saw a severe thunderstorm, which once again turned Sunday's event into a mudbath. Such were the poor conditions that the eventual winner in the 250cc class was Dutchman Remy van Rees, a rider who previously had rarely broken into the world's top 15 prior to the event. Van Rees won by sheer consistency, as most of the world's elite struggled in the conditions.

2000 saw another first, as Foxhill was to stage a 'triple-header' with 125cc, 250cc and 500cc Grand Prix events all taking place on the same weekend, with the opening 125cc race on the Saturday. However, for the third year in a row, torrential rain ruined the event. Only the opening 125cc race took place, before Sunday's racing was cancelled due to safety fears. This was the final Grand Prix event to ever take place at Foxhill. With the circuit waterlogged for three years in a row, the circuit's poor infrastructure was a source of irritation to the Grand Prix promoters (at the time) 'Action Group', who were keen to raise the profile of Grand Prix motocross by moving to circuits with improved infrastructure. Thus the 2000 British Grand Prix was the final Grand Prix to be staged at Foxhill.

=== New Millennium ===
After 2000, the British Grand Prix was not staged until 2004. After three years of major events ruined by heavy rain, the Foxhill circuit was dilapidated and worn out. However, it would soon gain a new lease of life as an amateur circuit. Since 2000, a wide range of amateur events, including youth, adult and historic races have been staged at the circuit. Organising bodies have invested in the circuit, and in recent years the circuit and infrastructure have been totally renovated.
