= Mitchell Evans =

Mitchell Evans may refer to:

- Mitch Evans (born 1994), New Zealand professional racing driver
- Mitchell Evans (motocross racer) (born 1998), Australian motocross racer
- Mitchell Evans (American football) (born 2003), American football player
