= 2025 ADAC MX Masters =

German Motocross Competition in 2025

The 2025 ADAC MX Masters season was the 21st ADAC MX Masters season. The series had seven rounds across Germany and one in France, running from April to September.

Max Nagl was the reigning champion in the premier MX Masters category, after he took his fifth title in 2024. Dutchman Roan van de Moosdijk would ultimately be crowned champion in the class, after a late season dual with Nagl that saw the championship lead change several times across the final rounds.

In the second tier Youngster Cup class, Swiss rider Nico Greutmann was the reigning champion. Despite missing the opening rounds, Danish rider Mads Fredsøe rode consistently to take the title.

For the first time in the history of the championship, a round was held in France. In addition, a number of rule changes were made ahead of the season, with the previous scenario of the top three in the Youngster Cup having to move into the MX Masters the following season being scrapped.

== Race calendar and results ==
=== MX Masters ===
Round	Date	Location	Race 1 Winner	Race 2 Winner	Race 3 Winner	Round Winner
1	26–27 April	(Brandenburg) Fürstlich Drehna	(Germany) Max Nagl	(Germany) Max Nagl	(Germany) Noah Ludwig	(Germany) Max Nagl
2	17–18 May	(Schleswig-Holstein) Mölln	(Germany) Maximilian Spies	(Netherlands) Roan van de Moosdijk	(Germany) Max Nagl	(Germany) Noah Ludwig
3	14–15 June	(Brandenburg) Dreetz	(Netherlands) Jeffrey Herlings	(Netherlands) Jeffrey Herlings	(Netherlands) Jeffrey Herlings	(Netherlands) Jeffrey Herlings
4	12–13 July	(North Rhine-Westphalia) Bielstein	(Austria) Marcel Stauffer	(Austria) Marcel Stauffer	(Germany) Max Nagl	(Austria) Marcel Stauffer
5	19–20 July	(Schleswig-Holstein) Tensfeld	(Norway) Håkon Fredriksen	(Netherlands) Roan van de Moosdijk	(Norway) Håkon Fredriksen	(Netherlands) Roan van de Moosdijk
6	9–10 August	(Baden-Württemberg) Gaildorf	(Netherlands) Roan van de Moosdijk	(Austria) Marcel Stauffer	(Germany) Maximilian Spies	(Germany) Maximilian Spies
7	30–31 August	(France) Bitche	(Germany) Max Nagl	(Germany) Max Nagl	(Belgium) Liam Everts	(Belgium) Liam Everts
8	13–14 September	(Baden-Württemberg) Holzgerlingen	(France) Jordi Tixier	(Netherlands) Roan van de Moosdijk	(Netherlands) Roan van de Moosdijk	(Netherlands) Roan van de Moosdijk

=== Youngster Cup ===
Round	Date	Location	Race 1 Winner	Race 2 Winner	Race 3 Winner	Round Winner
1	26–27 April	(Brandenburg) Fürstlich Drehna	(France) Quentin Prugnières	(France) Quentin Prugnières	(Sweden) Linus Persson	(Liechtenstein) Lyonel Reichl
2	17–18 May	(Schleswig-Holstein) Mölln	(France) Quentin Prugnières	(Denmark) Mads Fredsøe	(France) Maxime Grau	(Denmark) Mads Fredsøe
3	14–15 June	(Brandenburg) Dreetz	(Latvia) Markuss Kokins	(Denmark) Mads Fredsøe	(Netherlands) Bradley Mesters	(Denmark) Mads Fredsøe
	12–13 July	(North Rhine-Westphalia) Bielstein	Class not held	Class not held	Class not held	Class not held
4	19–20 July	(Schleswig-Holstein) Tensfeld	(Netherlands) Bradley Mesters	(Netherlands) Bradley Mesters	(Denmark) Nicolai Skovbjerg	(Netherlands) Bradley Mesters
5	9–10 August	(Baden-Württemberg) Gaildorf	(France) Maxime Grau	(France) Maxime Grau	(France) Maxime Grau	(France) Maxime Grau
6	30–31 August	(France) Bitche	(Australia) Liam Owens	(Switzerland) Nico Greutmann	(Switzerland) Nico Greutmann	(Switzerland) Nico Greutmann
7	13–14 September	(Baden-Württemberg) Holzgerlingen	(France) Maxime Grau	(France) Maxime Grau	(Liechtenstein) Lyonel Reichl	(France) Maxime Grau

=== Circuit locations ===
2025 ADAC MX Masters locations

== MX Masters ==
=== Participants ===
Team	Constructor	No	Rider	Rounds
KTM Sarholz Racing Team	Husqvarna	3	(Germany) Linus Jung	4
KTM Sarholz Racing Team	KTM	113	(Germany) Robin Lang	6–8
KTM Sarholz Racing Team	KTM	238	(Germany) Lukas Platt	1–3
KTM Sarholz Racing Team	KTM	300	(Germany) Noah Ludwig	All
KTM Sarholz Racing Team	KTM	470	(Germany) Peter König	1, 3–8
Triumph AQVA Racing	Triumph	4	(Estonia) Aleksei Vinogradov	1–3, 5
Triumph AQVA Racing	Triumph	6	(Estonia) Juri Vinogradov	1, 3, 5
Triumph AQVA Racing	Triumph	651	(Estonia) Meico Vettik	1–2
Triumph AQVA Racing	Triumph	721	(Estonia) Priit Rätsep	5–6
Becker Racing	KTM	7	(Germany) Maximilian Spies	All
Becker Racing	KTM	101	(Czech Republic) Václav Kovář	1–4, 6–7
Becker Racing	KTM	136	(Germany) Luca Harms	3, 6
Becker Racing	KTM	260	(Germany) Nico Koch	1–4, 7–8
Becker Racing	Gas Gas	278	(Belgium) Thomas Vermijl	1, 7–8
Becker Racing	KTM	440	(Germany) Marnique Appelt	1–6, 8
	Kawasaki	9	(Austria) Marco Heidegger	6
Dörr Motorsport Triumph Racing powered by Krettek	Triumph	12	(Germany) Max Nagl	All
Dörr Motorsport Triumph Racing powered by Krettek	Triumph	161	(Sweden) Alvin Östlund	4–5
Dörr Motorsport Triumph Racing powered by Krettek	Triumph	252	(Germany) Paul Bloy	6
Dörr Motorsport Triumph Racing powered by Krettek	Triumph	408	(Netherlands) Scott Smulders	4
MX-Handel Husqvarna Racing	Husqvarna	14	(Estonia) Tanel Leok	8
MX-Handel Husqvarna Racing	Husqvarna	87	(Switzerland) Kevin Brumann	1, 5–6
MX-Handel Husqvarna Racing	Husqvarna	733	(Estonia) Kaarel Tilk	1–2, 4–5, 7
	Triumph	19	(Germany) Max Benthin	3, 5
1. RMC Reutlingen	KTM	21	(Germany) Kevin Keim	6, 8
SHR Motorsports by Hartje	Yamaha	26	(Germany) Mike Stender	1–2, 4–8
SHR Motorsports by Hartje	Yamaha	32	(France) Milko Potisek	1–2
SHR Motorsports by Hartje	Yamaha	125	(Finland) Emil Weckman	1–7
SHR Motorsports by Hartje	Yamaha	297	(Sweden) Anton Gole	4–5
Red Bull KTM Factory Racing	KTM	27	(Germany) Simon Längenfelder	5
Cat Moto Bauerschmidt Husqvarna	Husqvarna	31	(Switzerland) Loris Freidig	6
BvZ Racing Team	KTM	34	(Germany) Toni Hoffmann	1, 3–8
Motoextreme Honda	Honda	37	(Estonia) Gert Krestinov	3, 5
KTM Kosak Team	KTM	39	(Netherlands) Roan van de Moosdijk	All
Luke's Racing Team - Hertrampf Gruppe	Yamaha	42	(Norway) Håkon Fredriksen	5
Luke's Racing Team - Hertrampf Gruppe	Honda	43	(Australia) Mitchell Evans	1
Osička MX Team	KTM	45	(Slovakia) Tomáš Kohút	1–4, 6–8
Osička MX Team	KTM	401	(Austria) Marcel Stauffer	All
	Husqvarna	46	(Denmark) Stefan Bech	2
Husqvarna Scandinavia	Husqvarna	52	(Sweden) Albin Gerhardsson	5
MSC Gaildorf/Luke's Racing - Hertrampf Gruppe	Yamaha	54	(Germany) Kevin Winkle	6, 8
KMP Honda Racing Team by DVAG	Honda	57	(Latvia) Edvards Bidzāns	1, 3–4, 6–7
KMP Honda Racing Team by DVAG	Honda	96	(Spain) Víctor Alonso	All
KMP Honda Racing Team by DVAG	Honda	177	(Norway) Cornelius Tøndel	3, 5
KMP Honda Racing Team by DVAG	Honda	224	(Czech Republic) Jakub Terešák	1–2, 4–8
KMP Honda Racing Team by DVAG	Honda	241	(Germany) Leopold Lichey	7
KMP Honda Racing Team by DVAG	Honda	911	(France) Jordi Tixier	4–8
TYK Team Yamaha Knobloch sponsored by A.T.E.C.	Yamaha	58	(Germany) Gerrit Heistermann	1–6
Peak Spirit Racing	Triumph	65	(Switzerland) Robin Scheiben	2, 6, 8
VisuAlz Production	Husqvarna	66	(Germany) Tim Koch	All
VisuAlz Production	KTM	255	(Germany) Marvin Koch	8
VisuAlz Production	Kawasaki	891	(Germany) Paul Ullrich	3–5, 7
KDH Motorsport	Fantic	67	(Germany) Lukas Hechtel	4, 6–8
SMX Racing Team	Yamaha	71	(Czech Republic) Pavel Dvořáček	1
Nestaan Husqvarna Factory Racing	Husqvarna	72	(Belgium) Liam Everts	7
Red Bull KTM Factory Racing	KTM	84	(Netherlands) Jeffrey Herlings	3
Sturm STC Racing	Yamaha	90	(Germany) Justin Trache	All
Motorrad Waldmann	Honda	91	(Germany) Paul Haberland	1–2, 5–6
Motorrad Waldmann	Honda	234	(Germany) Stefan Frank	4, 6–8
Werthmann Racing Team by Mefo Sport	KTM	99	(Czech Republic) Petr Rathouský	All
Werthmann Racing Team by Mefo Sport	KTM	130	(Czech Republic) Radim Kraus	2, 4, 8
Werthmann Racing Team by Mefo Sport	KTM	138	(Denmark) William Kleemann	3, 5, 7
Werthmann Racing Team by Mefo Sport	Gas Gas	271	(Czech Republic) Stanislav Vašíček	1–2, 6–8
Werthmann Racing Team by Mefo Sport	KTM	309	(Germany) Christian Forderer	6
Werthmann Racing Team by Mefo Sport	Ducati	377	(Czech Republic) Martin Krč	8
Werthmann Racing Team by Mefo Sport	Gas Gas	437	(Czech Republic) Martin Venhoda	1–7
Werthmann Racing Team by Mefo Sport	KTM	622	(Germany) Fabian Trossen	3, 6, 8
Werthmann Racing Team by Mefo Sport	KTM	716	(Germany) Leon Rehberg	1–6
Team 101 Racing	Yamaha	102	(Estonia) Erki Kahro	6
HT Group Racing Team	KTM	117	(Czech Republic) Jan Wagenknecht	2
Bauerschmidt Husqvarna	Husqvarna	131	(Germany) Cato Nickel	1–4, 6–8
GripMesser Racing Team	KTM	142	(Finland) Jere Haavisto	All
GripMesser Racing Team	KTM	421	(Denmark) Mathias Jørgensen	1–2
Kawasaki Elf Team Pfeil	Kawasaki	159	(Germany) Tobias Linke	1–3, 5
Honda Dream Racing Bells	Honda	163	(Japan) Yuki Okura	7
	Suzuki	169	(France) Victor Krompholtz	7
HM Racing Helge Mühlena	Husqvarna	171	(Germany) Fynn-Niklas Tornau	All
MX Shop	KTM	173	(Denmark) Jakob Kjær	5
AMX Racing	KTM	178	(Switzerland) Ramon Keller	6, 8
AMX Racing	Gas Gas	227	(Germany) Vincent Gallwitz	2–5, 7–8
Johannes-Bikes Suzuki	Suzuki	190	(Germany) Lorris Bollmann	1–7
Johannes-Bikes Suzuki	Suzuki	192	(Denmark) Glen Meier	1–3, 5
Johannes-Bikes Suzuki	Suzuki	410	(Germany) Max Thunecke	All
Johannes-Bikes Suzuki	Suzuki	991	(Germany) Mark Scheu	3–5
SixtySeven Racing Team Husqvarna	Husqvarna	991	(Germany) Mark Scheu	1–2
	Kawasaki	191	(Lithuania) Erlandas Mackonis	1–3, 5
DW-Racing	KTM	196	(Germany) Jaden Wendeler	4
	Gas Gas	197	(Germany) Thomas Haas	6–7
	Triumph	200	(Germany) Dave Abbing	3
	Gas Gas	208	(Germany) Ben Gosepath	5
	Husqvarna	228	(Germany) Tim Kühner	6, 8
A-Team We Race	KTM	244	(Germany) Max Bülow	2–3
JMT EstTrans Yamaha Keskus Racing Team	Yamaha	261	(Estonia) Jörgen-Matthias Talviku	All
	Kawasaki	299	(Germany) Sascha Ströbele	4, 6, 8
RGS Racing	KTM	306	(Germany) Julian Duvier	1–7
RGS Racing	Yamaha	750	(Sweden) Samuel Flink	1–7
KTM Schleenbecker Moto	KTM	310	(Germany) Marvin Dietermann	4
PB Racing/JJ Racing/ADAC Pfalz	Honda	317	(Germany) Nico Müller	6–8
Motorrad Waldmann/MSC Gaildorf	Yamaha	328	(Germany) Theo Praun	1–4, 6, 8
One8Seven Racing Team	KTM	380	(Germany) Phil Niklas Löb	4, 6
Drag'on Tek	Yamaha	426	(Belgium) Tias Callens	1–3
TKS Racing Team	Husqvarna	468	(Germany) Lukas Fiedler	1–6, 8
Stichting Motorsport Talent	KTM	484	(Netherlands) Dave Kooiker	4, 7
Gabriel SS24 KTM Factory Juniors	KTM	494	(Germany) Maximilian Werner	4
SixtySeven Racing Team Husqvarna	Husqvarna	511	(Germany) Jan Krug	4
Meyer Racing	Yamaha	532	(Germany) Constantin Piller	4, 6, 8
Meyer Racing	Yamaha	915	(Germany) Malik Schoch	6, 8
Rhino Racing Team	Yamaha	572	(Denmark) Rasmus Pedersen	1–3, 5
JG Bricklaying	KTM	601	(United Kingdom) Kelton Gwyther	4
HTS - KTM Racing Team	KTM	696	(Switzerland) Mike Gwerder	1–4, 6–8
MSC Mölln	Honda	734	(Germany) Kai Sedlak	2
	Gas Gas	800	(Germany) Ferdinand Maier	8
	Fantic	881	(Germany) Cedric Schick	4, 6–8
Triumph Schwäbische Alb	Triumph	898	(Germany) Elias Stapel	6, 8
Orion Racing Team	KTM	922	(Slovakia) Pavol Repčák	4
OneForOne Production	KTM	923	(Germany) Nils Weinmann	6
S-Tech Racing	Honda	931	(Germany) Marco Fleissig	6
	Yamaha	955	(France) Lilian Henry	7
Mefo Sport Racing Team	KTM	992	(Germany) Marvin Pfeffer	1, 4–5, 7–8

=== Riders Championship ===
Pos	Rider	Bike	FÜR (Brandenburg)			MÖL (Schleswig-Holstein)			DRE (Brandenburg)			BIE (North Rhine-Westphalia)			TEN (Schleswig-Holstein)			GAI (Baden-Württemberg)			BIT (France)			HOL (Baden-Württemberg)			Points
1	(Netherlands) Roan van de Moosdijk	KTM	3	4	5	3	1	8	3	3	6	4	2	Ret	3	1	4	1	2	8	5	5	3	2	1	1	454
2	(Germany) Max Nagl	Triumph	1	1	2	5	4	1	14	2	2	2	3	1	2	10	9	10	7	14	1	1	12	4	8	2	438
3	(Germany) Maximilian Spies	KTM	2	3	4	1	10	3	2	11	7	10	8	10	4	9	3	4	4	1	2	Ret	2	5	2	4	408
4	(Estonia) Jörgen-Matthias Talviku	Yamaha	9	2	7	6	11	12	5	4	3	5	6	5	6	3	5	5	6	3	Ret	4	4	21	Ret	14	328
5	(Germany) Noah Ludwig	KTM	14	24	1	4	2	2	12	7	9	6	5	3	Ret	12	7	3	3	7	Ret	18	7	7	7	3	322
6	(Austria) Marcel Stauffer	KTM	20	6	6	18	3	Ret	4	Ret	16	1	1	2	Ret	DNS	DNS	7	1	4	3	6	6	3	6	5	307
7	(France) Jordi Tixier	Honda										3	4	4	9	7	11	2	5	2	4	2	5	1	3	6	268
8	(Finland) Jere Haavisto	KTM	7	8	8	22	7	9	10	10	Ret	14	12	6	13	13	12	8	12	6	Ret	20	9	18	22	13	205
9	(Czech Republic) Jakub Terešák	Honda	12	5	14	2	6	7				Ret	7	15	14	16	Ret	11	14	9	Ret	Ret	8	9	5	12	194
10	(Germany) Nico Koch	KTM	11	9	3	7	21	5	16	9	Ret	7	9	9							7	7	18	Ret	15	8	177
11	(Slovakia) Tomáš Kohút	KTM	15	15	11	9	9	Ret	11	14	8	13	15	Ret				12	8	10	12	12	Ret	11	9	7	177
12	(Switzerland) Mike Gwerder	KTM	4	7	13	8	15	4	15	13	17	Ret	DNS	DNS				16	10	11	DNS	DNS	DNS	8	4	16	157
13	(Spain) Víctor Alonso	Honda	19	14	17	14	13	22	13	Ret	Ret	18	11	11	10	5	14	Ret	11	23	9	8	13	17	Ret	DNS	140
14	(Finland) Emil Weckman	Yamaha	16	11	Ret	13	8	6	8	5	5	24	Ret	7	16	Ret	18	14	16	28	Ret	Ret	DNS				130
15	(Germany) Tim Koch	Husqvarna	22	29	25	19	26	26	21	19	10	12	10	12	21	Ret	16	15	13	13	15	13	10	10	11	9	129
16	(Germany) Mike Stender	Yamaha	Ret	20	16	23	12	Ret				11	14	8	19	Ret	DNS	9	17	17	10	9	11	16	10	19	118
17	(Germany) Peter König	KTM	23	13	23				9	12	13	Ret	25	17	23	19	15	17	23	12	8	14	Ret	6	12	11	116
18	(Germany) Max Thunecke	Suzuki	21	18	20	17	19	13	18	Ret	12	17	19	21	17	15	28	20	18	16	13	10	15	15	18	10	100
19	(Switzerland) Kevin Brumann	Husqvarna	5	17	9										7	Ret	32	6	9	5							89
20	(Germany) Cato Nickel	Husqvarna	10	21	10	11	14	11	Ret	Ret	Ret	8	20	Ret				Ret	28	19	17	Ret	DNS	19	17	15	81
21	(Germany) Lukas Platt	KTM	18	16	15	20	18	10	7	6	4																76
22	(Netherlands) Jeffrey Herlings	KTM							1	1	1																75
23	(France) Milko Potisek	Yamaha	6	10	12	10	5	14																			69
24	(Estonia) Gert Krestinov	Honda							6	8	26				11	4	10										67
25	(Belgium) Liam Everts	Husqvarna																			6	3	1				60
26	(Germany) Simon Längenfelder	KTM													5	2	2										60
27	(Norway) Håkon Fredriksen	Yamaha													1	Ret	1										50
28	(Latvia) Edvards Bidzāns	Honda	13	Ret	19				17	20	11	16	22	Ret				26	27	30	11	16	21				45
29	(Norway) Cornelius Tøndel	Honda							DNQ	DNQ	DNQ				8	8	6										41
30	(Germany) Vincent Gallwitz	Gas Gas				30	24	18	19	16	Ret	19	18	16	18	17	17				14	30	Ret	27	24	23	38
31	(Czech Republic) Petr Rathouský	KTM	29	Ret	26	24	36	19	33	Ret	25	35	27	19	35	23	30	18	20	21	18	Ret	17	14	14	Ret	29
32	(Sweden) Alvin Östlund	Triumph										DNQ	DNQ	DNQ	36	6	8										28
33	(Slovakia) Pavol Repčák	KTM										9	13	14													27
34	(Sweden) Albin Gerhardsson	Husqvarna													12	11	13										27
35	(Germany) Mark Scheu	Husqvarna	27	Ret	DNS	12	33	16																			27
35	(Germany) Mark Scheu	Suzuki							22	DNS	DNS	22	16	13	24	Ret	DNS										27
36	(Estonia) Kaarel Tilk	Husqvarna	36	12	18	Ret	29	29				31	28	27	31	27	20				20	15	14				27
37	(Denmark) Rasmus Pedersen	Yamaha	25	25	21	31	17	17	26	15	14				20	20	19										25
38	(Sweden) Anton Gole	Yamaha										15	17	Ret	15	14	DNS										23
39	(Estonia) Meico Vettik	Triumph	17	Ret	DNS	15	16	15																			21
40	(Germany) Paul Haberland	Honda	34	26	Ret	16	22	Ret							26	Ret	DNS	13	15	Ret							18
41	(Germany) Toni Hoffmann	KTM	24	27	Ret				31	24	21	25	32	22	34	26	26	Ret	26	20	DNS	19	26	13	16	21	16
42	(Denmark) William Kleemann	KTM							28	Ret	22				30	18	27				19	17	16				14
43	(Australia) Mitchell Evans	Honda	8	Ret	DNS																						13
44	(Netherlands) Dave Kooiker	KTM										Ret	30	DNS							Ret	11	19				12
45	(Czech Republic) Martin Krč	Ducati																						25	13	17	12
46	(Germany) Marnique Appelt	KTM	31	31	24	25	23	21	20	17	15	29	24	20	33	21	22	25	25	Ret				22	23	22	12
47	(Germany) Elias Stapel	Triumph																Ret	DNS	DNS				12	21	Ret	9
48	(Switzerland) Loris Freidig	Husqvarna																22	22	15							6
49	(Japan) Yuki Okura	Honda																			16	27	20				6
50	(Germany) Paul Bloy	Triumph																Ret	19	18							5
51	(Denmark) Glen Meier	Suzuki	26	28	22	21	32	24	25	18	20				28	28	DNS										4
52	(Estonia) Tanel Leok	Husqvarna																						23	20	18	4
53	(Belgium) Tias Callens	Yamaha	35	Ret	30	26	20	20	30	25	19																4
54	(Germany) Fynn-Niklas Tornau	Husqvarna	DNQ	30	29	27	28	23	24	Ret	18	32	35	30	22	24	21	29	35	33	21	24	22	32	27	29	3
55	(Czech Republic) Václav Kovář	KTM	37	22	DNS	28	25	27	23	26	Ret	Ret	21	18				Ret	Ret	22	24	23	Ret				3
56	(Estonia) Erki Kahro	Yamaha																19	21	25							2
57	(Lithuania) Erlandas Mackonis	Kawasaki	30	19	27	DNQ	DNQ	DNQ	34	21	27				37	Ret	Ret										2
58	(Czech Republic) Radim Kraus	KTM				Ret	37	31				23	29	26										33	19	25	2
59	(Switzerland) Ramon Keller	KTM																21	29	26				24	25	20	1
60	(Czech Republic) Martin Venhoda	Gas Gas	28	23	28	Ret	27	25	36	23	24	20	23	23	29	29	29	23	24	34	23	Ret	DNS				1
61	(Germany) Kevin Winkle	Yamaha																DNS	30	27				20	Ret	Ret	1
	(France) Lilian Henry	Yamaha																			22	21	23				0
	(Germany) Constantin Piller	Yamaha										21	26	25				24	Ret	24				Ret	Ret	DNS	0
	(Germany) Leon Rehberg	KTM	33	Ret	32	29	30	28	27	22	23	DNQ	DNQ	33	32	25	25	27	34	32							0
	(Estonia) Priit Rätsep	Triumph													27	22	23	Ret	DNS	DNS							0
	(Germany) Justin Trache	Yamaha	DNQ	DNQ	DNQ	DNQ	DNQ	DNQ	29	Ret	Ret	34	36	DNS	DNQ	DNQ	DNQ	DNQ	37	Ret	Ret	22	24	26	Ret	26	0
	(Denmark) Jakob Kjær	KTM													25	Ret	24										0
	(Netherlands) Scott Smulders	Triumph										27	Ret	24													0
	(Switzerland) Robin Scheiben	Triumph				36	38	30										28	31	29				Ret	28	24	0
	(Germany) Paul Ullrich	Kawasaki							32	28	28	DNQ	34	31	DNQ	30	31				Ret	25	25				0
	(Sweden) Samuel Flink	Yamaha	DNQ	DNQ	DNQ	DNQ	DNQ	DNQ	DNQ	DNQ	DNQ	DNQ	DNQ	DNQ	DNQ	DNQ	DNQ	DNQ	DNQ	DNQ	25	28	29				0
	(Belgium) Thomas Vermijl	Gas Gas	Ret	DNS	DNS																Ret	Ret	27	36	26	31	0
	(Czech Republic) Stanislav Vašíček	Gas Gas	DNQ	DNQ	DNQ	DNQ	DNQ	Ret										DNQ	DNQ	DNQ	Ret	26	28	28	DNS	28	0
	(Germany) Maximilian Werner	KTM										26	Ret	28													0
	(Germany) Lorris Bollmann	Suzuki	DNQ	DNQ	DNQ	DNQ	DNQ	DNQ	DNQ	DNQ	DNQ	DNQ	DNQ	DNQ	DNQ	DNQ	DNQ	DNQ	DNQ	DNQ	26	29	30				0
	(Germany) Stefan Frank	Honda										33	37	32				DNQ	DNQ	DNQ	27	31	31	30	32	27	0
	(Germany) Julian Duvier	KTM	DNQ	33	33	35	Ret	33	Ret	27	Ret	DNQ	DNQ	DNQ	38	31	33	31	Ret	31	Ret	Ret	Ret				0
	(Germany) Linus Jung	Husqvarna										28	33	29													0
	(Germany) Lukas Fiedler	Husqvarna	DNQ	DNQ	DNQ	DNQ	DNQ	DNQ	DNQ	29	31	DNQ	DNQ	DNQ	DNQ	DNQ	DNQ	DNQ	DNQ	DNQ				31	29	Ret	0
	(Germany) Sascha Ströbele	Kawasaki										DNQ	DNQ	DNQ				DNQ	DNQ	DNQ				29	30	30	0
	(Germany) Max Benthin	Triumph							DNQ	31	29				DNQ	DNQ	Ret										0
	(Germany) Phil Niklas Löb	KTM										30	31	Ret				Ret	33	35							0
	(Germany) Max Bülow	KTM				34	35	32	35	30	Ret																0
	(Germany) Marco Fleissig	Honda																30	32	36							0
	(Germany) Gerrit Heistermann	Yamaha	DNQ	DNQ	DNQ	DNQ	DNQ	DNQ	37	32	30	DNQ	DNQ	DNQ	DNQ	DNQ	DNQ	DNQ	DNQ	DNQ							0
	(Czech Republic) Pavel Dvořáček	Yamaha	32	32	31																						0
	(Czech Republic) Jan Wagenknecht	KTM				32	31	Ret																			0
	(Germany) Malik Schoch	Yamaha																Ret	36	Ret				35	31	Ret	0
	(Germany) Theo Praun	Yamaha	DNQ	DNQ	DNQ	DNQ	DNQ	DNQ	DNQ	DNQ	DNQ	DNQ	DNQ	DNQ				DNQ	DNQ	DNQ				DNQ	DNQ	32	0
	(Denmark) Stefan Bech	Husqvarna				33	34	34																			0
	(Germany) Nico Müller	Honda																DNQ	DNQ	DNQ	DNQ	DNQ	DNQ	34	Ret	DNS	0
	(Germany) Robin Lang	KTM																DNQ	DNQ	DNQ	DNQ	DNQ	DNQ	37	Ret	DNS	0
	(Denmark) Mathias Jørgensen	KTM	Ret	DNS	DNS	Ret	Ret	DNS																			0
	(Germany) Kevin Keim	KTM																DNQ	DNQ	DNQ				DNQ	Ret	Ret	0
	(Germany) Lukas Hechtel	Fantic										DNQ	DNQ	DNQ				DNQ	DNQ	DNQ	Ret	DNS	DNS	DNQ	DNQ	DNQ	0
	(Germany) Dave Abbing	Triumph							Ret	DNS	DNS																0
	(Germany) Tobias Linke	Kawasaki	DNQ	DNQ	DNQ	DNQ	DNQ	DNQ	DNQ	DNQ	DNQ				DNQ	DNQ	DNQ										0
	(Estonia) Aleksei Vinogradov	Triumph	DNQ	DNQ	DNQ	DNQ	DNQ	DNQ	DNQ	DNQ	DNQ				DNQ	DNQ	DNQ										0
	(Germany) Marvin Pfeffer	KTM	DNQ	DNQ	DNQ							DNQ	DNQ	DNQ							DNQ	DNQ	DNQ	DNQ	DNQ	DNQ	0
	(Germany) Cedric Schick	Fantic										DNQ	DNQ	DNQ				DNQ	DNQ	DNQ	DNQ	DNQ	DNQ	DNQ	DNQ	DNQ	0
	(Estonia) Juri Vinogradov	Triumph	DNQ	DNQ	DNQ				DNQ	DNQ	DNQ				DNQ	DNQ	DNQ										0
	(Germany) Fabian Trossen	KTM							DNQ	DNQ	DNQ							DNQ	DNQ	DNQ				DNQ	DNQ	DNQ	0
	(Germany) Luca Harms	KTM							DNQ	DNQ	DNQ							DNQ	DNQ	DNQ							0
	(Germany) Thomas Haas	Gas Gas																DNQ	DNQ	DNQ	DNQ	DNQ	DNQ				0
	(Germany) Tim Kühner	Husqvarna																DNQ	DNQ	DNQ				DNQ	DNQ	DNQ	0
	(Germany) Kai Sedlak	Honda				DNQ	DNQ	DNQ																			0
	(Germany) Jaden Wendeler	KTM										DNQ	DNQ	DNQ													0
	(United Kingdom) Kelton Gwyther	KTM										DNQ	DNQ	DNQ													0
	(Germany) Jan Krug	Husqvarna										DNQ	DNQ	DNQ													0
	(Germany) Marvin Dietermann	KTM										DNQ	DNQ	DNQ													0
	(Germany) Ben Gosepath	Gas Gas													DNQ	DNQ	DNQ										0
	(Germany) Christian Forderer	KTM																DNQ	DNQ	DNQ							0
	(Germany) Nils Weinmann	KTM																DNQ	DNQ	DNQ							0
	(Austria) Marco Heidegger	Kawasaki																DNQ	DNQ	DNQ							0
	(Germany) Leopold Lichey	Honda																			DNQ	DNQ	DNQ				0
	(Germany) Marvin Koch	KTM																						DNQ	DNQ	DNQ	0
	(Germany) Ferdinand Maier	Gas Gas																						DNQ	DNQ	DNQ	0
Pos	Rider	Bike	FÜR (Brandenburg)			MÖL (Schleswig-Holstein)			DRE (Brandenburg)			BIE (North Rhine-Westphalia)			TEN (Schleswig-Holstein)			GAI (Baden-Württemberg)			BIT (France)			HOL (Baden-Württemberg)			Points

== Youngster Cup ==
=== Participants ===
Team	Constructor	No	Rider	Rounds
Wozniak MX Racing Team	Yamaha	2	(Denmark) Nicolai Skovbjerg	All
Wozniak MX Racing Team	Yamaha	5	(Denmark) Frederik Rahn Stampe	1–4, 7
KTM Sarholz Racing Team	Husqvarna	3	(Germany) Linus Jung	1–2, 4–7
KTM Sarholz Racing Team	Husqvarna	363	(Liechtenstein) Lyonel Reichl	2–7
KTM Sarholz Racing Team	KTM	10	(Germany) Lennox Willmann	All
KTM Sarholz Racing Team	KTM	510	(Germany) Tommy Schnitzler	5, 7
KTM Sarholz Racing Team	KTM	726	(Germany) Lorenz Balduf	7
KTM Sarholz Racing Team	KTM	770	(Germany) Leon Rudolph	1, 7
WZ Racing Team	KTM	8	(France) Maxime Grau	1–3, 5–7
WZ Racing Team	KTM	262	(Australia) Ryan Alexanderson	1–2
WZ Racing Team	KTM	319	(France) Quentin-Marc Prugnières	1–4
KS Performance Austria Racing Team	Fantic	13	(Austria) Jürgen Lehner	All
MX-Handel Husqvarna Racing	Husqvarna	14	(Estonia) Sebastian Leok	1–2
MX-Handel Husqvarna Racing	KTM	454	(Estonia) Jasper Koiv	1
RGS Racing	Husqvarna	17	(Belgium) Junior Bal	3–7
RGS Racing	KTM	114	(Germany) Devin Möhrke	4
RGS Racing	KTM	446	(Sweden) Linus Persson	All
Lutz Motorsport	Yamaha	18	(Germany) Devin Faber	5
Triumph AQVA Racing	Triumph	20	(Estonia) Romeo Pikand	All
Triumph AQVA Racing	Triumph	73	Matvey Lankin	1–3
BvZ Racing Team	KTM	23	(Germany) Oscar Denzau	1–4
MS Kluky	Honda	24	(Czech Republic) David Lupač	2, 4–5
SHR Motorsports by Hartje	Yamaha	28	(Germany) Jakob Zweiacker	1–4, 6–7
Cat Moto Bauerschmidt Husqvarna	Husqvarna	36	(Switzerland) Nico Greutmann	All
Cat Moto Bauerschmidt Husqvarna	Husqvarna	304	(Australia) Liam Owens	All
Cat Moto Bauerschmidt Husqvarna	Husqvarna	515	(Denmark) Mads Fredsøe	2–7
Kemco Management	KTM	38	(Belgium) Brent Van de Walle	6
De Baets MX Team Yamaha	Yamaha	40	(Netherlands) Lotte van Drunen	3
De Baets MX Team Yamaha	Yamaha	589	(Belgium) Tyla Van de Poel	3–4
	Gas Gas	41	(Denmark) Sebastian Lorenzen	4
HMX Racing	KTM	48	(Netherlands) Anthony Visser	2–4, 6
Werthmann Racing Team by Mefo Sport	Gas Gas	49	(Czech Republic) David Widerwill	All
Werthmann Racing Team by Mefo Sport	KTM	423	(Czech Republic) David Vondrák	1–3, 5, 7
Werthmann Racing Team by Mefo Sport	KTM	622	(Germany) Fabian Trossen	1–2
SMX Racing Team Rudnik	Yamaha	50	(Czech Republic) Daniel Mandys	1, 7
SMX Racing Team Rudnik	KTM	411	(Czech Republic) Jakub Jakl	5
Team #254 powered by BvZ Racing	Triumph	55	(Germany) Fiete-Joost Radbruch	2–3, 6
Team #254 powered by BvZ Racing	KTM	88	(Germany) Tom Leon Schröder	2–4
Peklaj Husqvarna Racing Team	Husqvarna	63	(Slovenia) Jaka Peklaj	7
KTM Kosak Team	KTM	70	(Germany) Valentin Kees	All
KTM Kosak Team	KTM	75	(Netherlands) Bradley Mesters	All
KTM Kosak Team	Gas Gas	611	(Latvia) Markuss Kokins	3–4
KMP Honda Racing Team by DVAG	Honda	82	(Spain) Manuel Carreras	All
KMP Honda Racing Team by DVAG	Honda	701	(Lithuania) Marius Adomaitis	All
MaxBart Motorsport	Husqvarna	85	(Italy) Alessandro Sadovschi	5
MaxBart Motorsport	Husqvarna	771	(Italy) Morgan Bennati	5
	KTM	100	(Netherlands) Danny van den Bosse	6
Becker Racing	Gas Gas	105	(Denmark) Lucas Bruhn	1–5, 7
Becker Racing	KTM	194	(Germany) Jonathan Frank	1–6
Becker Racing	KTM	529	(Belgium) Maxime Lucas	All
Mefo Sport Racing Team	KTM	110	(Estonia) Richard Paat	1–2, 4–7
Mefo Sport Racing Team	KTM	292	(Germany) Fabio Pfeffer	7
Top Cross TCS Racing Team	KTM	111	(Romania) Zoltan Ördög	7
Team AB Racing	KTM	116	(Germany) Ben-Lukas Bremser	5–7
Rynopower Germany	KTM	127	(Germany) Niklas Ohm	2–4
	KTM	137	(Switzerland) Kimi Isler	5, 7
Dörr Motorsport Triumph Racing powered by Krettek	Triumph	140	(United States) Brandon Eade	5
Dörr Motorsport Triumph Racing powered by Krettek	Triumph	408	(Netherlands) Scott Smulders	All
Luke's Racing - Hertrampf Gruppe	Yamaha	141	(Greece) Dimitrios Ganotis	4
Sturm STC Racing	Gas Gas	143	(Latvia) Roberts Lūsis	All
CTM Motorhomes	Yamaha	146	(Belgium) Thybe Ceulemans	6
MMX Racing Team Luxemburg	Honda	174	(Belgium) Bastian Stommen	1
DW Racing	KTM	196	(Germany) Jaden Wendeler	5, 7
ADAC Team Hessen-Thüringen	KTM	221	(Germany) Anthony Caspari	1–4, 7
	Yamaha	222	(El Salvador) Marco Carranza	3
Auctor MX Team	Honda	223	(Czech Republic) Premysl Zimek	5–6
JT911	KTM	225	(France) Nicolas Clément	6–7
Retro-Gaz	Honda	226	(Switzerland) Arthur Steffen	5, 7
SevenSevenSix Racing Team/KFV Kalteneck	Husqvarna	246	(Germany) Leon Denz	7
	Triumph	250	(Switzerland) Kjetil Oswald	5
Team Enduro Koch	Husqvarna	259	(Germany) Justin Roll	5, 7
	Husqvarna	270	(Israel) Ofir Casey Tzemach	4
AMX Racing	KTM	275	(Germany) Eric Rakow	All
	Husqvarna	290	(Germany) Joshua Völker	All
Zimt und Zucker	Husqvarna	322	(Germany) Gustav Busch	3
Aforia Superior Gas Gas	Gas Gas	337	(Switzerland) Noryn Polsini	1–2, 4–5
TYK Team Yamaha Knobloch Sponsored by A.T.E.C.	Yamaha	338	(Germany) Erwin Hohenstein	3
TYK Team Yamaha Knobloch Sponsored by A.T.E.C.	Yamaha	576	(Germany) Joel Franz	7
JJ Racing	Husqvarna	345	(Germany) Fabian Kling	1–3, 5–7
Bauerschmidt Husqvarna	Husqvarna	363	(Liechtenstein) Lyonel Reichl	1
Team Ties Pol Motors Gas Gas	Gas Gas	400	(Netherlands) Roan Tolsma	3–4, 6
	KTM	422	(United Kingdom) Sonny Rooney	1–3, 6–7
GripMesser Racing Team	Gas Gas	427	(Netherlands) Mick Kennedy	1–6
GripMesser Racing Team	Gas Gas	612	(Estonia) Joosep Pärn	All
	KTM	431	(Czech Republic) Tomáš Pikart	1–2, 4–5
Bluebird Racing Team/ADAC Berlin-Brandenburg	KTM	438	(Germany) Jan-Erik Kettner	1–3, 4
Crown MX by Mefo Sport	Triumph	444	(Germany) Leam Mitterhuber	1–2
FDI Racing - SD Install	KTM	447	(Czech Republic) Jiří Klejšmíd	1, 5, 7
P&P Racing	Honda	457	(Germany) Paul Neunzling	2–3
Ošicka MX Team	KTM	466	(Czech Republic) Vaclav Janout	1–5
SixtySeven Racing Team Husqvarna	Husqvarna	473	(Germany) Collin Wohnhas	1–3, 5–7
SixtySeven Racing Team Husqvarna	Husqvarna	511	(Germany) Jan Krug	3–6
SixtySeven Racing Team Husqvarna	Husqvarna	724	(Netherlands) Jaymian Ramakers	1–2, 4–7
SixtySeven Racing Team Husqvarna	KTM	919	(Austria) Maximilian Ernecker	1–4, 6–7
Cermen KTM Racing Team	KTM	479	(Czech Republic) Vítězslav Marek	1, 3–4
	KTM	480	(Finland) Kasimir Hindersson	1
Brouwer Motors KTM	KTM	485	(Netherlands) Senna van Voorst	6
MRA Racing Team	Gas Gas	499	(Slovakia) Jaroslav Katriňák	1–5, 7
Team MJC Yamaha Monster Energy	Yamaha	503	(Belgium) Jarne Bervoets	6
MSC Mölln	KTM	508	(Germany) Matti Schlahn	2
Rynopower-Germany Racing	KTM	513	(Germany) Hannes Lüders	1–4, 6
TD Motorsport	KTM	518	(Germany) Fritz Greiner	All
DVS Junior Racing Team	TM	524	(Belgium) Emile De Baere	4, 7
	Husqvarna	526	(France) Loïc Kiffer	6
	Triumph	555	(Germany) Noel Schmitt	All
B&B Mallon Racing	Gas Gas	588	(Germany) Julien Kayser	1, 4
Motorrad Bauerschmidt MVB33	KTM	604	(Germany) Jimmy Opitz	1
MSC Gaildorf/Crown MX Team	Triumph	621	(Germany) Max Bommerer	5, 7
KTM GST Berlin Racing/ADAC Berlin-Brandenburg	KTM	645	(Germany) Richard Stephan	1–3, 6–7
KM Kaczmarek Motorsport	KTM	725	(Germany) Dominic Bilau	1–2, 4
Zweiradcenter Umbach/BR Motorsports	Kawasaki	783	(Germany) Leo Paukovic	5, 7
Team Ties Pol Motors Gas Gas	Gas Gas	812	(Netherlands) Sem de Lange	1–4
DTM Utilitaires	KTM	828	(Belgium) Tom Dukerts	1–2, 6
	Gas Gas	848	(Denmark) Emil Gjedde	1–4
Laurense Motors Kawasaki	Kawasaki	888	(Netherlands) Eric van Helvoirt	6
	TM	954	(Germany) Kjell Maurice Wendt	2–4

=== Riders Championship ===
Pos	Rider	Bike	FÜR (Brandenburg)			MÖL (Schleswig-Holstein)			DRE (Brandenburg)			TEN (Schleswig-Holstein)			GAI (Baden-Württemberg)			BIT (France)			HOL (Baden-Württemberg)			Points
1	(Denmark) Mads Fredsøe	Husqvarna				2	1	3	3	1	5	2	6	2	4	4	2	4	2	2	6	5	6	353
2	(France) Maxime Grau	KTM	12	4	9	9	3	1	2	8	15				1	1	1	3	4	4	1	1	2	340
3	(Netherlands) Bradley Mesters	KTM	3	8	24	3	2	15	6	7	1	1	1	3	5	7	7	20	15	5	7	8	10	310
4	(Australia) Liam Owens	Husqvarna	4	22	17	5	4	13	7	3	9	7	Ret	6	8	5	3	1	5	3	3	2	4	309
5	(Switzerland) Nico Greutmann	Husqvarna	10	5	7	6	DSQ	9	12	4	6	Ret	3	5	15	11	13	2	1	1	4	3	3	300
6	(Liechtenstein) Lyonel Reichl	Husqvarna	5	3	4	Ret	5	5	15	20	16	15	12	9	2	2	5	7	8	11	5	4	1	281
7	(Denmark) Nicolai Skovbjerg	Yamaha	13	6	2	15	11	4	5	5	4	3	4	1	16	8	18	5	10	9	9	Ret	7	278
8	(Germany) Valentin Kees	KTM	7	12	21	10	9	11	9	29	8	5	7	8	3	3	4	6	7	8	2	34	DNS	246
9	(Netherlands) Scott Smulders	Triumph	20	11	14	23	8	8	8	Ret	10	4	5	4	7	9	10	Ret	9	6	8	16	11	212
10	(France) Quentin Prugnières	KTM	1	1	Ret	1	DSQ	2	4	2	3	Ret	2	7										193
11	(Sweden) Linus Persson	KTM	Ret	25	1	14	18	10	14	26	7	6	18	12	6	14	20	12	11	15	11	35	13	160
12	(Austria) Maximilian Ernecker	KTM	2	2	11	7	13	14	Ret	6	2	Ret	Ret	DNS				17	6	37	Ret	15	Ret	145
13	(Spain) Manuel Carreras	Honda	34	Ret	3	8	7	6	24	Ret	Ret	Ret	10	19	11	20	16	25	17	22	13	6	8	131
14	(Germany) Eric Rakow	KTM	25	16	20	17	6	7	11	12	12	8	Ret	14	29	Ret	25	10	16	16	Ret	12	14	124
15	(Slovakia) Jaroslav Katriňák	Gas Gas	16	14	8	12	24	19	DNQ	DNQ	DNQ	Ret	20	17	10	10	9				10	11	5	112
16	(Germany) Jan Krug	Husqvarna							16	11	13	23	9	10	13	15	8	15	3	Ret				99
17	(Germany) Linus Jung	Husqvarna	11	15	10	21	DNS	DNS				9	16	Ret	17	13	12	8	19	17	23	10	24	95
18	(Estonia) Sebastian Leok	Husqvarna	6	10	5	4	10	Ret																71
19	(Belgium) Maxime Lucas	KTM	30	38	22	31	30	31	22	16	24	Ret	Ret	26	38	19	14	9	14	18	12	9	9	69
20	(Denmark) Lucas Bruhn	Gas Gas	22	17	16	13	14	12	13	18	19	11	Ret	13	24	Ret	DNS				18	Ret	19	69
21	(Estonia) Joosep Pärn	Gas Gas	23	21	29	16	12	28	Ret	17	Ret	10	11	Ret	25	16	21	16	20	12	32	26	17	63
22	(Belgium) Junior Bal	Husqvarna							19	15	Ret	14	21	24	31	34	37	13	12	10	14	13	21	58
23	(Latvia) Markuss Kokins	Gas Gas							1	10	11	12	Ret	DNS										55
24	(Germany) Leon Rudolph	KTM	9	7	19																35	7	12	51
25	(Latvia) Roberts Lūsis	Gas Gas	26	26	Ret	32	21	21	10	9	22	20	8	11	35	Ret	Ret	21	Ret	24	DNQ	DNQ	DNQ	47
26	(Germany) Fritz Greiner	KTM	19	9	13	25	17	29	17	14	18	Ret	23	18	23	17	23	24	Ret	21	27	28	28	47
27	(Czech Republic) Vaclav Janout	KTM	DNQ	DNQ	DNQ	DNQ	25	24	31	19	Ret	19	15	Ret	9	12	6							46
28	(Lithuania) Marius Adomaitis	Honda	31	18	30	18	15	16	23	21	20	25	Ret	16	20	28	19	Ret	22	13	34	17	15	44
29	(Italy) Morgan Bennati	Husqvarna													12	6	11							34
30	(Belgium) Jarne Bervoets	Yamaha																11	13	7				32
31	(Netherlands) Roan Tolsma	Gas Gas							21	Ret	17	13	22	15				22	24	14				25
32	(Czech Republic) Tomáš Pikart	KTM	14	19	15	22	23	20				Ret	14	Ret	Ret	DNS	DNS							23
33	(Germany) Richard Stephan	KTM	15	31	6	Ret	DNS	DNS	20	Ret	DNS							30	Ret	30	30	23	25	22
34	(Czech Republic) Vítězslav Marek	KTM	18	13	25				18	13	DNS	26	DNS	DNS										22
35	(Australia) Ryan Alexanderson	KTM	17	20	12	20	DNS	17																19
36	(Finland) Kasimir Hindersson	KTM	8	23	18																			16
37	(Germany) Jonathan Frank	KTM	24	34	23	29	20	26	Ret	25	14	Ret	13	Ret	21	30	29	Ret	26	26				16
38	(Switzerland) Arthur Steffen	Honda													14	18	24				17	20	23	15
39	(Czech Republic) David Widerwill	Gas Gas	Ret	29	Ret	24	22	27	Ret	31	25	22	Ret	25	22	27	17	18	18	27	16	29	22	15
40	(Estonia) Romeo Pikand	Triumph	21	33	Ret	19	16	25	Ret	Ret	23	17	Ret	Ret	26	29	27	27	25	19	19	24	26	15
41	(Netherlands) Mick Kennedy	Gas Gas	27	27	28	11	27	23	28	22	21	21	27	23	32	25	26	19	21	20				13
42	(Czech Republic) Daniel Mandys	Yamaha	35	39	32																15	14	35	13
43	(Belgium) Tyla Van de Poel	Yamaha							25	27	28	16	17	20										10
44	(Germany) Collin Wohnhas	Husqvarna	33	30	Ret	28	29	33	30	33	26				18	24	15	33	33	31	Ret	30	DNS	9
45	(Netherlands) Senna van Voorst	KTM																14	27	29				7
46	(Estonia) Richard Paat	KTM	28	24	31	Ret	26	22				18	Ret	Ret	19	21	22	28	Ret	25	21	25	20	6
47	(Slovenia) Jaka Peklaj	Husqvarna																			36	21	16	5
48	(Netherlands) Sem de Lange	Gas Gas	Ret	37	27	30	19	18	26	34	DNS	27	28	27										5
49	(Germany) Leo Paukovic	Kawasaki													37	Ret	Ret				20	18	DNS	4
50	(Czech Republic) Jiří Klejšmíd	KTM	DNQ	DNQ	DNQ										DNQ	DNQ	DNQ				25	22	18	3
51	(Germany) Fabian Kling	Husqvarna	32	32	33	26	Ret	Ret	Ret	28	31				28	Ret	DNS	DNQ	DNQ	DNQ	24	19	29	2
52	(Denmark) Sebastian Lorenzen	Gas Gas										24	19	28										2
	(Germany) Joshua Völker	Husqvarna	DNQ	DNQ	DNQ	DNQ	DNQ	DNQ	29	32	30	DNQ	25	21	27	22	28	26	28	28	22	31	27	0
	(Netherlands) Jaymian Ramakers	Husqvarna	DNQ	DNQ	DNQ	Ret	36	36				28	29	22	DNQ	DNQ	DNQ	32	Ret	32	DNQ	DNQ	DNQ	0
	(Belgium) Tom Dukerts	KTM	DNQ	DNQ	DNQ	Ret	28	Ret										23	23	23				0
	(Denmark) Frederik Rahn Stampe	Yamaha	DNQ	DNQ	DNQ	27	33	30	Ret	23	29	DNQ	24	Ret							DNQ	DNQ	33	0
	(Czech Republic) Jakub Jakl	KTM													30	23	30							0
	(Netherlands) Lotte van Drunen	Yamaha							27	24	27													0
	(Germany) Jakob Zweiacker	Yamaha	29	28	26	DNQ	35	32	32	35	32	Ret	26	Ret				DNQ	DNQ	DNQ	29	36	DNS	0
	(Germany) Lennox Willmann	KTM	DNQ	DNQ	DNQ	DNQ	DNQ	DNQ	DNQ	DNQ	DNQ	DNQ	DNQ	DNQ	33	26	31	29	31	34	26	33	30	0
	(Germany) Ben-Lukas Bremser	KTM													36	31	32	31	30	33	28	27	31	0
	(Netherlands) Danny van den Bosse	KTM																Ret	29	38				0
	(Germany) Gustav Busch	Husqvarna							33	30	33													0
	(Romania) Zoltan Ördög	KTM																			31	32	32	0
	(Czech Republic) David Vondrák	KTM	36	35	Ret	34	31	34	DNQ	DNQ	DNQ				DNQ	33	35				DNQ	DNQ	DNQ	0
	(Italy) Alessandro Sadovschi	Husqvarna													34	32	33							0
	(Belgium) Brent Van de Walle	KTM																34	32	35				0
	(Switzerland) Noryn Polsini	Gas Gas	DNQ	DNQ	DNQ	35	32	Ret				DNQ	DNQ	DNQ	DNQ	DNQ	DNQ							0
	(Germany) Paul Neunzling	Honda				33	34	35	DNQ	DNQ	DNQ													0
	(Belgium) Emile De Baere	TM										Ret	DNS	DNS							33	Ret	34	0
	(France) Loïc Kiffer	Husqvarna																35	34	36				0
	(Germany) Hannes Lüders	KTM	37	36	34	DNQ	DNQ	DNQ	DNQ	DNQ	DNQ	DNQ	DNQ	DNQ				DNQ	DNQ	DNQ				0
	(Czech Republic) Premysl Zimek	Honda													DNQ	DNQ	34	DNQ	DNQ	DNQ				0
	(Switzerland) Kimi Isler	KTM													39	35	36				37	37	36	0
	(Netherlands) Eric van Helvoirt	Kawasaki																Ret	Ret	Ret				0
	(Israel) Ofir Casey Tzemach	Husqvarna										Ret	DNS	DNS										0
	(Austria) Jürgen Lehner	Fantic	DNQ	DNQ	DNQ	DNQ	DNQ	DNQ	DNQ	DNQ	DNQ	DNQ	DNQ	DNQ	DNQ	DNQ	DNQ	DNQ	DNQ	DNQ	DNQ	DNQ	DNQ	0
	(Germany) Noel Schmitt	Triumph	DNQ	DNQ	DNQ	DNQ	DNQ	DNQ	DNQ	DNQ	DNQ	DNQ	DNQ	DNQ	DNQ	DNQ	DNQ	DNQ	DNQ	DNQ	DNQ	DNQ	DNQ	0
	(United Kingdom) Sonny Rooney	KTM	DNQ	DNQ	DNQ	DNQ	DNQ	DNQ	DNQ	DNQ	DNQ							DNQ	DNQ	DNQ	DNQ	DNQ	DNQ	0
	(Germany) Anthony Caspari	KTM	DNQ	DNQ	DNQ	DNQ	DNQ	DNQ	DNQ	DNQ	DNQ	DNQ	DNQ	DNQ							DNQ	DNQ	DNQ	0
	(Germany) Jan-Erik Kettner	KTM	DNQ	DNQ	DNQ	DNQ	DNQ	DNQ	DNQ	DNQ	DNQ	DNQ	DNQ	DNQ										0
	(Denmark) Emil Gjedde	Gas Gas	DNQ	DNQ	DNQ	DNQ	DNQ	DNQ	DNQ	DNQ	DNQ	DNQ	DNQ	DNQ										0
	(Germany) Oscar Denzau	KTM	DNQ	DNQ	DNQ	DNQ	DNQ	DNQ	DNQ	DNQ	DNQ	DNQ	DNQ	DNQ										0
	(Netherlands) Anthony Visser	KTM				DNQ	DNQ	DNQ	DNQ	DNQ	DNQ	DNQ	DNQ	DNQ				DNQ	DNQ	DNQ				0
	Matvey Lankin	Triumph	DNQ	DNQ	DNQ	DNQ	DNQ	DNQ	DNQ	DNQ	DNQ													0
	(Germany) Dominic Bilau	KTM	DNQ	DNQ	DNQ	DNQ	DNQ	DNQ				DNQ	DNQ	DNQ										0
	(Germany) Niklas Ohm	KTM				DNQ	DNQ	DNQ	DNQ	DNQ	DNQ	DNQ	DNQ	DNQ										0
	(Germany) Tom Leon Schröder	KTM				DNQ	DNQ	DNQ	DNQ	DNQ	DNQ	DNQ	DNQ	DNQ										0
	(Germany) Kjell Maurice Wendt	TM				DNQ	DNQ	DNQ	DNQ	DNQ	DNQ	DNQ	DNQ	DNQ										0
	(Germany) Fiete-Joost Radbruch	Triumph				DNQ	DNQ	DNQ	DNQ	DNQ	DNQ							DNQ	DNQ	DNQ				0
	(Czech Republic) David Lupač	Honda				DNQ	DNQ	DNQ				DNQ	DNQ	DNQ	DNQ	DNQ	DNQ							0
	(Germany) Fabian Trossen	KTM	DNQ	DNQ	DNQ	DNQ	DNQ	DNQ																0
	(Germany) Leam Mitterhuber	Triumph	DNQ	DNQ	DNQ	DNQ	DNQ	DNQ																0
	(Germany) Julien Kayser	Gas Gas	DNQ	DNQ	DNQ							DNQ	DNQ	DNQ										0
	(Germany) Jaden Wendeler	KTM													DNQ	DNQ	DNQ				DNQ	DNQ	DNQ	0
	(Germany) Max Bommerer	Triumph													DNQ	DNQ	DNQ				DNQ	DNQ	DNQ	0
	(Germany) Justin Roll	Husqvarna													DNQ	DNQ	DNQ				DNQ	DNQ	DNQ	0
	(Germany) Tommy Schnitzler	KTM													DNQ	DNQ	DNQ				DNQ	DNQ	DNQ	0
	(France) Nicolas Clément	KTM																DNQ	DNQ	DNQ	DNQ	DNQ	DNQ	0
	(Estonia) Jasper Koiv	KTM	DNQ	DNQ	DNQ																			0
	(Germany) Jimmy Opitz	KTM	DNQ	DNQ	DNQ																			0
	(Belgium) Bastian Stommen	Honda	DNQ	DNQ	DNQ																			0
	(Germany) Matti Schlahn	KTM				DNQ	DNQ	DNQ																0
	(Germany) Erwin Hohenstein	Yamaha							DNQ	DNQ	DNQ													0
	(El Salvador) Marco Carranza	Yamaha							DNQ	DNQ	DNQ													0
	(Germany) Devin Möhrke	KTM										DNQ	DNQ	DNQ										0
	(Greece) Dimitrios Ganotis	Yamaha										DNQ	DNQ	DNQ										0
	(Switzerland) Kjetil Oswald	Triumph													DNQ	DNQ	DNQ							0
	(United States) Brandon Eade	Triumph													DNQ	DNQ	DNQ							0
	(Germany) Joel Franz	Yamaha																			DNQ	DNQ	DNQ	0
	(Germany) Leon Denz	Husqvarna																			DNQ	DNQ	DNQ	0
	(Germany) Lorenz Balduf	KTM																			DNQ	DNQ	DNQ	0
	(Germany) Fabio Pfeffer	KTM																			DNQ	DNQ	DNQ	0
Pos	Rider	Bike	FÜR (Brandenburg)			MÖL (Schleswig-Holstein)			DRE (Brandenburg)			TEN (Schleswig-Holstein)			GAI (Baden-Württemberg)			BIT (France)			HOL (Baden-Württemberg)			Points
