= 2018 Motocross des Nations =

The 2018 Motocross des Nations was a motocross race held on 6 October and 7 October 2018. The event was held at the Red Bud circuit, in Michigan, United States. Motocross des Nations was last held in United States in 2010 but never at this venue.

France went into the event as the defending champions after taking their fifth title in 2017 and successfully defended their title.

== Entry list ==
Start numbers are allocated based on the team finish from the previous year's edition. France are the reigning champions so they start with numbers 1, 2 and 3.

	Country	Nr	Rider	Class	Motorcycle
1	France	1	Gautier Paulin	MXGP	Husqvarna
1	France	2	Dylan Ferrandis	MX2	Yamaha
1	France	3	Jordi Tixier	Open	KTM
2	Netherlands	4	Jeffrey Herlings	MXGP	KTM
2	Netherlands	5	Calvin Vlaanderen	MX2	Honda
2	Netherlands	6	Glenn Coldenhoff	Open	KTM
3	(United Kingdom) Great Britain	7	Tommy Searle	MXGP	Kawasaki
3	(United Kingdom) Great Britain	8	Ben Watson	MX2	Yamaha
3	(United Kingdom) Great Britain	9	Max Anstie	Open	Husqvarna
4	Belgium	10	Clément Desalle	MXGP	Kawasaki
4	Belgium	11	Jago Geerts	MX2	Yamaha
4	Belgium	12	Jeremy Van Horebeek	Open	Yamaha
5	Switzerland	13	Valentin Guillod	MXGP	KTM
5	Switzerland	14	Killian Auberson	MX2	KTM
5	Switzerland	15	Jeremy Seewer	Open	Yamaha
6	Australia	16	Kirk Gibbs	MXGP	KTM
6	Australia	17	Hunter Lawrence	MX2	Honda
6	Australia	18	Mitchell Evans	Open	KTM
7	Italy	19	Antonio Cairoli	MXGP	KTM
7	Italy	20	Michele Cervellin	MX2	Yamaha
7	Italy	21	Alessandro Lupino	Open	Kawasaki
8	Estonia	22	Tanel Leok	MXGP	Husqvarna
8	Estonia	23	Hardi Roosiorg	MX2	KTM
8	Estonia	24	Harri Kullas	Open	Husqvarna
9	United States	25	Eli Tomac	MXGP	Kawasaki
9	United States	26	Aaron Plessinger	MX2	Yamaha
9	United States	27	Justin Barcia	Open	Yamaha
10	Sweden	28	Filip Bengtsson	MXGP	Yamaha
10	Sweden	29	Alvin Östlund	MX2	Yamaha
10	Sweden	30	Anton Gole	Open	Yamaha
11	Canada	37	Colton Facciotti	MXGP	Honda
11	Canada	38	Jess Pettis	MX2	Yamaha
11	Canada	39	Tyler Medaglia	Open	Kawasaki
12	(Republic of Ireland) Ireland	43	Gary Gibson	MXGP	KTM
12	(Republic of Ireland) Ireland	44	Martin Barr	MX2	Husqvarna
12	(Republic of Ireland) Ireland	45	Richard Bird	Open	KTM
13	Portugal	46	Rui Gonçalves	MXGP	Yamaha
13	Portugal	47	Luis Outeiro	MX2	Honda
13	Portugal	48	Diogo Graça	Open	Suzuki
14	Puerto Rico	49	Kevin Windham	MXGP	Honda
14	Puerto Rico	50	Ryan Sipes	MX2	Husqvarna
14	Puerto Rico	51	Travis Pastrana	Open	Suzuki
15	Spain	52	José Butrón	MXGP	KTM
15	Spain	53	Jorge Prado	MX2	KTM
15	Spain	54	Carlos Campano	Open	Yamaha
16	Germany	58	Ken Roczen	MXGP	Honda
16	Germany	59	Henry Jacobi	MX2	Husqvarna
16	Germany	60	Max Nagl	Open	TM
17	New Zealand	61	Cody Cooper	MXGP	Honda
17	New Zealand	62	Hamish Harwood	MX2	KTM
17	New Zealand	63	Rhys Carter	Open	Yamaha
18	Czech Republic	64	Václav Kovář	MXGP	KTM
18	Czech Republic	65	Martin Krč	MX2	KTM
18	Czech Republic	66	Martin Michek	Open	KTM
19	Brazil	67	Gustavo Pessoa	MXGP	Kawasaki
19	Brazil	68	Enzo Lopes	MX2	Suzuki
19	Brazil	69	Fabio Santos	Open	Yamaha
20	South Africa	76	Michael Docherty	MXGP	Husqvarna
20	South Africa	77	Bradley Lionnet	MX2	Yamaha
20	South Africa	78	Caleb Tennant	Open	Husqvarna
21	Ukraine	82	Dmytro Asmanov	MXGP	KTM
21	Ukraine	83	Dmytro Chernov	MX2	Husqvarna
21	Ukraine	84	Volodymyr Tarasov	Open	KTM
22	Iceland	85	Einar Sigurðsson	MXGP	Husqvarna
22	Iceland	86	Andri Snær Guðmundsson	MX2	Husqvarna
22	Iceland	87	Ingvi Björn Birgisson	Open	Husqvarna
23	Argentina	88	Juan Pablo Luzzardi	MXGP	KTM
23	Argentina	89	Dario Arco	MX2	Honda
23	Argentina	90	Jose Felipe	Open	Honda
24	Israel	112	Dan Maya	MXGP	Yamaha
24	Israel	113	Ariel Dadia	MX2	Yamaha
24	Israel	114		Open	
25	Philippines	115	Kenneth San Andres	MXGP	Kawasaki
25	Philippines	116	Mark Reggie Flores	MX2	Kawasaki
25	Philippines	117	Carlo Rodriguez	Open	Kawasaki
26	Japan	118	Taiki Koga	MXGP	Honda
26	Japan	119	Haruki Yokoyama	MX2	Kawasaki
26	Japan	120	Toshiki Tomita	Open	Honda
27	Mexico	121	Julio César Zambrano	MXGP	Husqvarna
27	Mexico	122	Tre Fierro	MX2	KTM
27	Mexico	123	Félix Lopez	Open	KTM
28	Austria	124	Roland Edelbacher	MXGP	KTM
28	Austria	125	Marcel Stauffer	MX2	KTM
28	Austria	126	Pascal Rauchenecker	Open	Husqvarna
29	Venezuela	127	Carlos Badiali	MXGP	Yamaha
29	Venezuela	128	Anthony Rodríguez	MX2	Yamaha
29	Venezuela	129	Lorenzo Locurcio	Open	Yamaha
30	Guatemala	136	José Fernandez	MXGP	KTM
30	Guatemala	137	Rodrigo Bardales	MX2	KTM
30	Guatemala	138	Jorge González	Open	Honda
	Country	Nr	Rider	Class	Motorcycle

== Practice ==
Practice is run on a class by class basis.

=== MXGP ===
Place	Nr	Rider	Motorcycle	Time	Difference
1	4	(Netherlands) Herlings	KTM	1:58.541	
2	19	(Italy) Cairoli	KTM	1:59.646	+1.105
3	10	(Belgium) Desalle	Kawasaki	2:01.911	+3.370
4	58	(Germany) Roczen	Honda	2:02.064	+3.523
5	7	(United Kingdom) Searle	Kawasaki	2:02.429	+3.888
6	1	(France) Paulin	Husqvarna	2:02.693	+4.152
7	22	(Estonia) Leok	Husqvarna	2:02.812	+4.271
8	124	(Austria) Edelbacher	KTM	2:04.276	+5.735
9	28	(Sweden) Bengtsson	Yamaha	2:04.580	+6.039
10	25	(United States) Tomac	Kawasaki	2:04.684	+6.143
11	52	(Spain) Butrón	KTM	2:05.477	+6.936
12	46	(Portugal) Gonçalves	Yamaha	2:07.384	+8.843
13	16	(Australia) Gibbs	KTM	2:07.779	+9.238
14	49	(Puerto Rico) Windham	Honda	2:07.833	+9.292
15	61	(New Zealand) Cooper	Honda	2:08.001	+9.460
16	13	(Switzerland) Guillod	KTM	2:08.056	+9.515
17	76	(South Africa) Docherty	Husqvarna	2:08.344	+9.803
18	64	(Czech Republic) Kovář	KTM	2:08.470	+9.929
19	37	(Canada) Facciotti	Honda	2:08.847	+10.306
20	127	(Venezuela) Badiali	Yamaha	2:09.193	+10.652
21	43	(Republic of Ireland) Gibson	KTM	2:09.398	+10.857
22	67	(Brazil) Pessoa	Kawasaki	2:09.714	+11.173
23	121	(Mexico) Zambrano	Husqvarna	2:11.350	+12.809
24	88	(Argentina) Luzzardi	Honda	2:11.469	+12.928
25	82	(Ukraine) Asmanov	KTM	2:11.655	+13.114
26	118	(Japan) Koga	Honda	2:12.282	+13.741
27	136	(Guatemala) Fernández	KTM	2:25.229	+26.688
28	85	(Iceland) Sigurðsson	Husqvarna	2:27.710	+29.169
29	112	(Israel) Maya	Yamaha	2:33.107	+34.566
30	115	(Philippines) San Andres	Kawasaki	2:34.626	+36.005
Place	Nr	Rider	Motorcycle	Time	Difference

=== MX2 ===
Place	Nr	Rider	Motorcycle	Time	Difference
1	2	(France) Ferrandis	Yamaha	2:02.033	
2	5	(Netherlands) Vlaanderen	Honda	2:02.990	+0.957
3	17	(Australia) Lawrence	Honda	2:03.689	+1.656
4	8	(United Kingdom) Watson	Yamaha	2:04.673	+2.640
5	53	(Spain) Prado	KTM	2:05.033	+3.000
6	20	(Italy) Cervellin	Yamaha	2:05.340	+3.307
7	59	(Germany) Jacobi	Husqvarna	2:05.786	+3.753
8	44	(Republic of Ireland) Barr	Husqvarna	2:05.839	+3.806
9	26	(United States) Plessinger	Yamaha	2:06.039	+4.006
10	29	(Sweden) Östlund	Yamaha	2:06.423	+4.390
11	11	(Belgium) Geerts	Yamaha	2:06.458	+4.425
12	23	(Estonia) Roosiorg	KTM	2:06.822	+4.789
13	38	(Canada) Pettis	Yamaha	2:07.516	+5.483
14	128	(Venezuela) Rodríguez	Yamaha	2:07.971	+5.938
15	68	(Brazil) Lopes	Suzuki	2:08.579	+6.546
16	125	(Austria) Stauffer	KTM	2:08.699	+6.666
17	50	(Puerto Rico) Sipes	Husqvarna	2:10.017	+7.984
18	62	(New Zealand) Harwood	KTM	2:10.914	+8.881
19	119	(Japan) Yokoyama	Kawasaki	2:10.944	+8.911
20	65	(Czech Republic) Krč	KTM	2:11.407	+9.374
21	14	(Switzerland) Auberson	KTM	2:11.467	+9.434
22	47	(Portugal) Outeiro	Honda	2:12.102	+10.069
23	77	(South Africa) Lionnet	Yamaha	2:12.616	+10.583
24	86	(Iceland) Guðmundsson	Husqvarna	2:15.450	+13.417
25	83	(Ukraine) Chernov	Husqvarna	2:16.072	+14.039
26	122	(Mexico) Fierro	KTM	2:18.209	+16.176
27	89	(Argentina) Arco	Honda	2:19.626	+17.593
28	137	(Guatemala) Bardales	KTM	2:31.132	+29.099
29	116	(Philippines) Flores	Kawasaki	2:33.616	+31.583
30	113	(Israel) Dadia	Yamaha	3:26.414	+1:24.381
Place	Nr	Rider	Motorcycle	Time	Difference

=== Open ===
Place	Nr	Rider	Motorcycle	Time	Difference
1	9	(United Kingdom) Anstie	Husqvarna	2:00.575	
2	6	(Netherlands) Coldenhoff	KTM	2:00.593	+0.018
3	12	(Belgium) Van Horebeek	Yamaha	2:01.644	+1.069
4	27	(United States) Barcia	Yamaha	2:01.977	+1.402
5	60	(Germany) Nagl	TM	2:02.242	+1.667
6	24	(Estonia) Kullas	Husqvarna	2:02.734	+2.159
7	3	(France) Tixier	KTM	2:02.976	+2.401
8	15	(Switzerland) Seewer	Yamaha	2:03.045	+2.470
9	126	(Austria) Rauchenecker	Husqvarna	2:03.156	+2.581
10	21	(Italy) Lupino	Kawasaki	2:03.234	+2.659
11	30	(Sweden) Gole	Yamaha	2:03.890	+3.315
12	39	(Canada) Medaglia	Kawasaki	2:04.107	+3.532
13	18	(Australia) Evans	KTM	2:04.679	+4.104
14	54	(Spain) Campano	Yamaha	2:05.630	+5.055
15	66	(Czech Republic) Michek	KTM	2:06.964	+6.389
16	69	(Brazil) Santos	Yamaha	2:07.765	+7.190
17	63	(New Zealand) Carter	Yamaha	2:07.993	+7.418
18	129	(Venezuela) Locurcio	Yamaha	2:08.300	+7.725
19	84	(Ukraine) Tarasov	KTM	2:08.484	+7.909
20	120	(Japan) Tomita	Honda	2:09.965	+9.390
21	123	(Mexico) López	KTM	2:12.707	+12.132
22	78	(South Africa) Tennant	Husqvarna	2:12.991	+12.416
23	90	(Argentina) Felipe	Honda	2:14.209	+13.634
24	45	(Republic of Ireland) Bird	KTM	2:14.620	+14.045
25	48	(Portugal) Graça	Suzuki	2:14.814	+14.239
26	51	(Puerto Rico) Pastrana	Suzuki	2:16.371	+15.796
27	87	(Iceland) Birgisson	Husqvarna	2:19.299	+18.724
28	117	(Philippines) Rodríguez	Kawasaki	2:34.809	+34.234
29	138	(Guatemala) González	Honda	2:36.573	+35.998
Place	Nr	Rider	Motorcycle	Time	Difference

== Qualifying Races ==
Qualifying is run on a class by class basis. Top 19 countries after qualifying go directly to the main Motocross des Nations races. The remaining countries go to a smaller final. Best 2 scores count.

=== MXGP ===
Place	Nr	Rider	Motorcycle	Laps	Gap
1	19	(Italy) Cairoli	KTM	11	
2	58	(Germany) Roczen	Honda	11	+21.286
3	4	(Netherlands) Herlings	KTM	11	+36.455
4	1	(France) Paulin	Husqvarna	11	+38.939
5	7	(United Kingdom) Searle	Kawasaki	11	+54.353
6	52	(Spain) Butrón	KTM	11	+1:05.652
7	28	(Sweden) Bengtsson	Yamaha	11	+1:08.403
8	13	(Switzerland) Guillod	KTM	11	+1:45.321
9	16	(Australia) Gibbs	KTM	11	+1:46.994
10	124	(Austria) Edelbacher	KTM	11	+1:50.371
11	76	(South Africa) Docherty	Husqvarna	11	+1:58.746
12	118	(Japan) Koga	Honda	11	+2:04.765
13	46	(Portugal) Gonçalves	Yamaha	11	+2:05.809
14	43	(Republic of Ireland) Gibson	KTM	11	+2:13.341
15	61	(New Zealand) Cooper	Honda	11	+2:24.817
16	64	(Czech Republic) Kovář	KTM	10	+1 Lap
17	37	(Canada) Facciotti	Honda	10	+1 Lap
18	127	(Venezuela) Badiali	Yamaha	10	+1 Lap
19	82	(Ukraine) Asmanov	KTM	10	+1 Lap
20	67	(Brazil) Pessoa	Kawasaki	10	+1 Lap
21	49	(Puerto Rico) Windham	Honda	10	+1 Lap
22	121	(Mexico) Zambrano	Husqvarna	10	+1 Lap
23	88	(Argentina) Luzzardi	Honda	10	+1 Lap
24	136	(Guatemala) Fernández	KTM	9	+2 Laps
25	22	(Estonia) Leok	Husqvarna	9	+2 Laps
26	115	(Philippines) San Andres	Kawasaki	9	+2 Laps
27	10	(Belgium) Desalle	Kawasaki	8	Did Not Finish
28	112	(Israel) Maya	Yamaha	8	+3 Laps
29	25	(United States) Tomac	Kawasaki	7	Did Not Finish
30	85	(Iceland) Sigurðsson	Husqvarna	7	Did Not Finish

=== MX2 ===
Place	Nr	Rider	Motorcycle	Laps	Gap
1	2	(France) Ferrandis	Yamaha	11	
2	17	(Australia) Lawrence	Honda	11	+00.766
3	59	(Germany) Jacobi	Husqvarna	11	+34.130
4	20	(Italy) Cervellin	Yamaha	11	+38.511
5	53	(Spain) Prado	KTM	11	+44.348
6	68	(Brazil) Lopes	Suzuki	11	+47.486
7	8	(United Kingdom) Watson	Yamaha	11	+48.457
8	38	(Canada) Pettis	Yamaha	11	+1:00.775
9	29	(Sweden) Östlund	Yamaha	11	+1:01.127
10	128	(Venezuela) Rodríguez	Yamaha	11	+1:05.909
11	26	(United States) Plessinger	Yamaha	11	+1:07.767
12	5	(Netherlands) Vlaanderen	Honda	11	+1:09.726
13	125	(Austria) Stauffer	KTM	11	+1:37.283
14	50	(Puerto Rico) Sipes	Husqvarna	11	+1:55.455
15	44	(Republic of Ireland) Barr	Husqvarna	11	+1:57.279
16	23	(Estonia) Roosiorg	KTM	11	+2:01.460
17	62	(New Zealand) Harwood	KTM	11	+2:05.395
18	11	(Belgium) Geerts	Yamaha	11	+2:13.069
19	47	(Portugal) Outeiro	Honda	11	+2:15.376
20	65	(Czech Republic) Krč	KTM	10	+1 Lap
21	86	(Iceland) Guðmundsson	Husqvarna	10	+1 Lap
22	77	(South Africa) Lionnet	Yamaha	10	+1 Lap
23	89	(Argentina) Arco	Honda	10	+1 Lap
24	119	(Japan) Yokoyama	Kawasaki	10	+1 Lap
25	122	(Mexico) Fierro	KTM	9	+2 Laps
26	116	(Philippines) Flores	Kawasaki	7	+4 Laps
27	83	(Ukraine) Chernov	Husqvarna	4	Did Not Finish
28	14	(Switzerland) Auberson	KTM	0	Did Not Finish
	137	(Guatemala) Bardales	KTM	0	Did Not Start
	113	(Israel) Dadia	Yamaha	0	Did Not Start

=== Open ===
Place	Nr	Rider	Motorcycle	Laps	Gap
1	6	(Netherlands) Coldenhoff	KTM	11	
2	27	(United States) Barcia	Yamaha	11	+03.444
3	12	(Belgium) Van Horebeek	Yamaha	11	+27.885
4	15	(Switzerland) Seewer	Yamaha	11	+34.906
5	24	(Estonia) Kullas	Husqvarna	11	+35.900
6	21	(Italy) Lupino	Kawasaki	11	+40.365
7	3	(France) Tixier	KTM	11	+41.172
8	60	(Germany) Nagl	TM	11	+59.068
9	9	(United Kingdom) Anstie	Husqvarna	11	+1:13.365
10	84	(Ukraine) Tarasov	KTM	11	+1:27.256
11	30	(Sweden) Gole	Yamaha	11	+1:28.665
12	66	(Czech Republic) Michek	KTM	11	+1:43.678
13	39	(Canada) Medaglia	Kawasaki	11	+1:51.378
14	63	(New Zealand) Carter	Yamaha	11	+1:53.340
15	18	(Australia) Evans	KTM	11	+1:54.960
16	129	(Venezuela) Locurcio	Yamaha	11	+2:20.771
17	126	(Austria) Rauchenecker	Husqvarna	10	+1 Lap
18	69	(Brazil) Santos	Yamaha	10	+1 Lap
19	120	(Japan) Tomita	Honda	10	+1 Lap
20	48	(Portugal) Graça	Suzuki	10	+1 Lap
21	87	(Iceland) Birgisson	Husqvarna	10	+1 Lap
22	123	(Mexico) López	KTM	10	+1 Lap
23	45	(Republic of Ireland) Bird	KTM	10	+1 Lap
24	78	(South Africa) Tennant	KTM	10	+1 Lap
25	90	(Argentina) Felipe	Honda	9	+2 Laps
26	138	(Guatemala) González	Honda	9	+2 Laps
27	51	(Puerto Rico) Pastrana	Suzuki	6	Did Not Finish
28	117	(Philippines) Rodríguez	Kawasaki	3	Did Not Finish
29	54	(Spain) Campano	Yamaha	2	Did Not Start

=== Qualification Standings ===
- Qualified Nations

Place	Nation	Points
1	Netherlands	4
2	Italy	5
3	France	5
4	Germany	5
5	Australia	11
6	Spain	11
7	(United Kingdom) Great Britain	12
8	Switzerland	12
9	United States	13
10	Sweden	16
11	Canada	21
12	Estonia	21
13	Belgium	21
14	Austria	23
15	Brazil	24
16	Venezuela	26
17	Czech Republic	28
18	New Zealand	29
19	(Republic of Ireland) Ireland	29

- Nations Admitted to the B-Final

Place	Nation	Points
20	Ukraine	29
21	Japan	31
22	Portugal	32
23	South Africa	33
24	Puerto Rico	35
25	Iceland	42
26	Mexico	44
27	Argentina	46
28	Guatemala	50
29	Philippines	52
30	Israel	28

== B-Final ==
The B-Final is for the nations who finished 20th-31st in qualifying. The top nation from the B-Final qualify for the Motocross des Nations races. Best 2 scores for each nation counts.

=== Race ===
Place	Nr	Rider	Motorcycle	Laps	Gap
1	76	(South Africa) Docherty	Husqvarna	10	
2	50	(Puerto Rico) Sipes	Husqvarna	10	+12.374
3	46	(Portugal) Gonçalves	Yamaha	10	+29.214
4	49	(Puerto Rico) Windham	Honda	10	+51.041
5	120	(Japan) Tomita	Honda	10	+56.074
6	118	(Japan) Koga	Honda	10	+1:04.677
7	48	(Portugal) Graça	Suzuki	10	+1:06.950
8	88	(Argentina) Luzzardi	Honda	10	+1:30.859
9	123	(Mexico) López	KTM	10	+1:37.921
10	86	(Iceland) Guðmundsson	Husqvarna	10	+1:54.087
11	90	(Argentina) Felipe	Honda	10	+2:03.671
12	119	(Japan) Yokoyama	Kawasaki	10	+2:04.724
13	84	(Ukraine) Tarasov	KTM	10	+2:10.597
14	47	(Portugal) Outeiro	Honda	10	+2:17.626
15	87	(Iceland) Birgisson	Husqvarna	10	+2:18.864
16	83	(Ukraine) Chernov	Husqvarna	9	+1 Lap
17	122	(Mexico) Fierro	KTM	9	+1 Lap
18	51	(Puerto Rico) Pastrana	Suzuki	9	+1 Lap
19	82	(Ukraine) Asmanov	KTM	9	+1 Lap
20	78	(South Africa) Tennant	Husqvarna	9	+1 Lap
21	85	(Iceland) Sigurðsson	Husqvarna	9	+1 Lap
22	77	(South Africa) Lionnet	Yamaha	9	+1 Lap
23	136	(Guatemala) Fernández	KTM	9	+1 Lap
24	138	(Guatemala) González	Honda	8	+2 Laps
25	116	(Philippines) Flores	Kawasaki	7	+3 Laps
26	115	(Philippines) San Andres	Kawasaki	7	+3 Laps
27	121	(Mexico) Zambrano	Husqvarna	5	Did Not Finish
28	117	(Philippines) Rodríguez	Kawasaki	0	Did Not Finish
29	89	(Argentina) Arco	Honda	0	Did Not Finish
	112	(Israel) Maya	Yamaha	0	Did Not Start
	137	(Guatemala) Bardales	KTM	0	Did Not Start
	113	(Israel) Dadia	Yamaha	0	Did Not Start
Place	Nr	Rider	Motorcycle	Laps	Gap

=== B-Final Standings ===
- Puerto Rico qualify for the Motocross des Nations races.

Place	Nation	Points
1	Puerto Rico	6
2	Portugal	10
3	Japan	11
4	Argentina	19
5	South Africa	21
6	Iceland	25
7	Mexico	26
8	Ukraine	29
9	Guatemala	47
10	Philippines	51
11	Israel	-
Place	Nation	Points

== Motocross des Nations races ==
The main Motocross des Nations races consist of 3 races which combine two classes together in each. Lowest score wins with each nation allowed to drop their worst score after the final race.

=== MXGP+MX2 ===
Place	Nr	Rider	Motorcycle	Laps	Gap
1	4	(Netherlands) Herlings	KTM	16	
2	1	(France) Paulin	Husqvarna	16	+25.416
3	53	(Spain) Prado	KTM	16	+31.483
4	25	(United States) Tomac	Kawasaki	16	+40.195
5	10	(Belgium) Desalle	Kawasaki	16	+51.878
6	19	(Italy) Cairoli	KTM	16	+57.900
7	2	(France) Ferrandis	Yamaha	16	+1:00.029
8	17	(Australia) Lawrence	Honda	16	+1:03.066
9	37	(Canada) Facciotti	Honda	16	+1:51.758
10	20	(Italy) Cervellin	Yamaha	16	+1:54.397
11	61	(New Zealand) Cooper	Honda	16	+1:55.966
12	22	(Estonia) Leok	Husqvarna	16	+1:59.730
13	11	(Belgium) Geerts	Yamaha	16	+2:02.779
14	16	(Australia) Gibbs	KTM	16	+2:11.101
15	8	(United Kingdom) Watson	Yamaha	16	+2:13.244
16	44	(Republic of Ireland) Barr	Husqvarna	15	+1 Lap
17	52	(Spain) Butrón	KTM	15	+1 Lap
18	26	(United States) Plessinger	Yamaha	15	+1 Lap
19	124	(Austria) Edelbacher	KTM	15	+1 Lap
20	64	(Czech Republic) Kovář	KTM	15	+1 Lap
21	38	(Canada) Pettis	Yamaha	15	+1 Lap
22	29	(Sweden) Östlund	Yamaha	15	+1 Lap
23	68	(Brazil) Lopes	Suzuki	15	+1 Lap
24	23	(Estonia) Roosiorg	KTM	15	+1 Lap
25	58	(Germany) Roczen	Honda	15	+1 Lap
26	128	(Venezuela) Rodríguez	Yamaha	15	+1 Lap
27	13	(Switzerland) Guillod	KTM	15	+1 Lap
28	125	(Austria) Stauffer	KTM	15	+1 Lap
29	65	(Czech Republic) Krč	KTM	15	+1 Lap
30	50	(Puerto Rico) Sipes	Husqvarna	14	+2 Laps
31	67	(Brazil) Pessoa	Kawasaki	14	+2 Laps
32	49	(Puerto Rico) Windham	Honda	14	+2 Laps
33	43	(Republic of Ireland) Gibson	KTM	14	+2 Laps
34	7	(United Kingdom) Searle	Kawasaki	13	Did Not Finish
35	127	(Venezuela) Badiali	Yamaha	13	Did Not Finish
36	5	(Netherlands) Vlaanderen	Honda	8	Did Not Finish
37	59	(Germany) Jacobi	Husqvarna	6	Did Not Finish
38	62	(New Zealand) Harwood	KTM	4	Did Not Finish
39	28	(Sweden) Bengtsson	Yamaha	0	Did Not Finish
	14	(Switzerland) Auberson*	KTM		Did Not Start
Place	Nr	Rider	Motorcycle	Laps	Gap

- Killian Auberson was injured during the MX2 qualifying race.

=== Nations standings after Race 1 ===
Place	Nation	Points
1	France	9
2	Italy	16
3	Belgium	18
4	Spain	20
5	United States	22
6	Australia	22
7	Canada	30
8	Estonia	36
9	Netherlands	37
10	Austria	47
11	New Zealand	49
12	(United Kingdom) Great Britain	49
13	(Republic of Ireland) Ireland	49
14	Czech Republic	49
15	Brazil	54
16	Sweden	61
17	Venezuela	61
18	Germany	62
19	Puerto Rico	62
20	Switzerland	27
Place	Nation	Points

=== MX2+Open ===
Place	Nr	Rider	Motorcycle	Laps	Gap
1	6	(Netherlands) Coldenhoff	KTM	15	
2	17	(Australia) Lawrence	Honda	15	+16.063
3	53	(Spain) Prado	KTM	15	+20.510
4	8	(United Kingdom) Watson	Yamaha	15	+21.458
5	15	(Switzerland) Seewer	Yamaha	15	+23.272
6	12	(Belgium) Van Horebeek	Yamaha	15	+28.847
7	24	(Estonia) Kullas	Husqvarna	15	+32.905
8	2	(France) Ferrandis	Yamaha	15	+37.022
9	27	(United States) Barcia	Yamaha	15	+59.661
10	18	(Australia) Evans	KTM	15	+1:09.475
11	60	(Germany) Nagl	TM	15	+1:10.665
12	21	(Italy) Lupino	Kawasaki	15	+1:34.629
13	9	(United Kingdom) Anstie	Husqvarna	15	+1:37.325
14	20	(Italy) Cervellin	Yamaha	15	+1:48.701
15	126	(Austria) Rauchenecker	Husqvarna	15	+1:52.995
16	26	(United States) Plessinger	Yamaha	15	+1:58.003
17	44	(Republic of Ireland) Barr	Husqvarna	15	+2:01.127
18	11	(Belgium) Geerts	Yamaha	15	+2:05.941
19	128	(Venezuela) Rodríguez	Yamaha	15	+2:08.095
20	38	(Canada) Pettis	Yamaha	15	+2:10.321
21	23	(Estonia) Roosiorg	KTM	15	+2:16.805
22	54	(Spain) Campano	Yamaha	14	+1 Lap
23	30	(Sweden) Gole	Yamaha	14	+1 Lap
24	29	(Sweden) Östlund	Yamaha	14	+1 Lap
25	59	(Germany) Jacobi	Husqvarna	14	+1 Lap
26	66	(Czech Republic) Michek	KTM	14	+1 Lap
27	65	(Czech Republic) Krč	KTM	14	+1 Lap
28	69	(Brazil) Santos	Yamaha	14	+1 Lap
29	62	(New Zealand) Harwood	KTM	14	+1 Lap
30	125	(Austria) Stauffer	KTM	14	+1 Lap
31	68	(Brazil) Lopes	Suzuki	14	+1 Lap
32	3	(France) Tixier	KTM	11	Did Not Finish
33	129	(Venezuela) Locurcio	Yamaha	11	Did Not Finish
34	39	(Canada) Medaglia	Kawasaki	9	Did Not Finish
35	45	(Republic of Ireland) Bird	KTM	9	Did Not Finish
36	50	(Puerto Rico) Sipes	Husqvarna	9	Did Not Finish
37	63	(New Zealand) Carter	Yamaha	8	Did Not Finish
38	51	(Puerto Rico) Pastrana	Suzuki	3	Did Not Finish
	5	(Netherlands) Vlaanderen	Honda	0	Did Not Start
	11	(Switzerland) Auberson	KTM	0	Did Not Start
Place	Nr	Rider	Motorcycle	Laps	Gap

=== Nations standings after Race 2 ===
Place	Nation	Points
1	Australia	34
2	Belgium	42
3	Italy	42
4	Spain	45
5	United States	47
6	France	49
7	Estonia	64
8	(United Kingdom) Great Britain	66
9	Canada	84
10	Austria	92
11	Germany	98
12	(Republic of Ireland) Ireland	101
13	Czech Republic	102
14	Sweden	108
15	Venezuela	113
16	Brazil	113
17	New Zealand	115
18	Puerto Rico	136
19	Netherlands	38
20	Switzerland	32
Place	Nation	Points

=== MXGP+Open ===
Place	Nr	Rider	Motorcycle	Laps	Gap
1	6	(Netherlands) Coldenhoff	KTM	16	
2	4	(Netherlands) Herlings	KTM	16	+3.970
3	1	(France) Paulin	Husqvarna	16	+1:03.687
4	19	(Italy) Cairoli	KTM	16	+1:05.191
5	21	(Italy) Lupino	Kawasaki	16	+1:11.582
6	9	(United Kingdom) Anstie	Husqvarna	16	+1:12.469
7	25	(United States) Tomac	Kawasaki	16	+1:12.820
8	60	(Germany) Nagl	TM	16	+1:27.271
9	58	(Germany) Roczen	Honda	16	+1:44.294
10	7	(United Kingdom) Searle	Kawasaki	16	+1:50.621
11	12	(Belgium) Van Horebeek	Yamaha	16	+1:52.338
12	24	(Estonia) Kullas	Husqvarna	16	+1:54.863
13	27	(United States) Barcia	Yamaha	16	+1:59.002
14	18	(Australia) Evans	KTM	16	+2:02.314
15	3	(France) Tixier	KTM	16	+2:04.278
16	129	(Venezuela) Locurcio	Yamaha	15	+1 Lap
17	30	(Sweden) Gole	Yamaha	15	+1 Lap
18	52	(Spain) Butrón	KTM	15	+1 Lap
19	22	(Estonia) Leok	Husqvarna	15	+1 Lap
20	28	(Sweden) Bengtsson	Yamaha	15	+1 Lap
21	126	(Austria) Rauchenecker	Husqvarna	15	+1 Lap
22	54	(Spain) Campano	Yamaha	15	+1 Lap
23	39	(Canada) Medaglia	Kawasaki	15	+1 Lap
24	67	(Brazil) Pessoa	Kawasaki	15	+1 Lap
25	124	(Austria) Edelbacher	KTM	15	+1 Lap
26	37	(Canada) Facciotti	Honda	15	+1 Lap
27	10	(Belgium) Desalle	Kawasaki	15	+1 Lap
28	64	(Czech Republic) Kovář	KTM	15	+1 Lap
29	13	(Switzerland) Guillod	KTM	14	+2 Laps
30	43	(Republic of Ireland) Gibson	KTM	14	+2 Laps
31	45	(Republic of Ireland) Bird	KTM	14	+2 Laps
32	61	(New Zealand) Cooper	Honda	14	+2 Laps
33	16	(Australia) Gibbs	KTM	14	+2 Laps
34	15	(Switzerland) Seewer	Yamaha	12	Did Not Finish
35	63	(New Zealand) Carter	Yamaha	12	+4 Laps
36	69	(Brazil) Santos	Yamaha	9	Did Not Finish
37	127	(Venezuela) Badiali	Yamaha	3	Did Not Finish
38	66	(Czech Republic) Michek	KTM	3	Did Not Finish
39	51	(Puerto Rico) Pastrana	Suzuki	0	Did Not Finish
40	49	(Puerto Rico) Windham	Honda	0	Did Not Finish
Place	Nr	Rider	Motorcycle	Laps	Gap

=== Nations standings after Race 3 ===
Place	Nation	Points
1	France	35
2	Italy	37
3	Netherlands	41
4	Australia	48
5	(United Kingdom) Great Britain	48
6	United States	49
7	Belgium	53
8	Spain	63
9	Estonia	71
10	Germany	78
11	Canada	99
12	Sweden	106
13	Austria	108
14	(Republic of Ireland) Ireland	127
15	Venezuela	129
16	Czech Republic	130
17	Brazil	137
18	New Zealand	144
19	Puerto Rico	175
20	Switzerland	95
Place	Nation	Points

== Final standings ==
Following the event, Italy were disqualified from second place overall due to failing fuel tests.

Place	Nation	Points	Total
1	France	2 + 3 + 6 + 8 + 13	32
2	Netherlands	1 + 1 + 1 + 2 + 34	39
3	Great Britain	4 + 4 + 8 + 12 + 13	41
4	Australia	2 + 7 + 10 + 12 + 12	43
5	United States	4 + 5 + 9 + 11 + 14	43
6	Belgium	5 + 6 + 9 + 11 + 16	47
7	Spain	3 + 3 + 15 + 16 + 20	57
8	Estonia	7 + 10 + 10 + 17 + 19	63
9	Germany	6 + 7 + 11 + 23 + 23	70
10	Canada	8 + 18 + 19 + 21 + 24	90
11	Sweden	15 + 18 + 20 + 21 + 22	96
12	Austria	13 + 17 + 19 + 23 + 26	98
13	Ireland	14 + 15 + 28 + 29 + 31	117
14	Venezuela	14 + 17 + 24 + 31 + 33	119
15	Czech Republic	18 + 24 + 25 + 26 + 27	120
16	Brazil	21 + 22 + 26 + 29 + 29	127
17	New Zealand	9 + 27 + 30 + 33 + 35	134
18	Puerto Rico	28 + 30 + 34 + 36 + 37	165
19	Switzerland	5 + 25 + 27 + 32	89
20	Portugal		
21	Japan		
22	Argentina		
23	South Africa		
24	Iceland		
25	Mexico		
26	Ukraine		
27	Guatemala		
28	Philippines		
29	Israel		
~~2~~	~~Italy~~	~~4 + 5 + 6 + 10 + 12~~	~~37~~
