= Mitchell Evans (motocross racer) =

Australian motocross racer (born 1998)

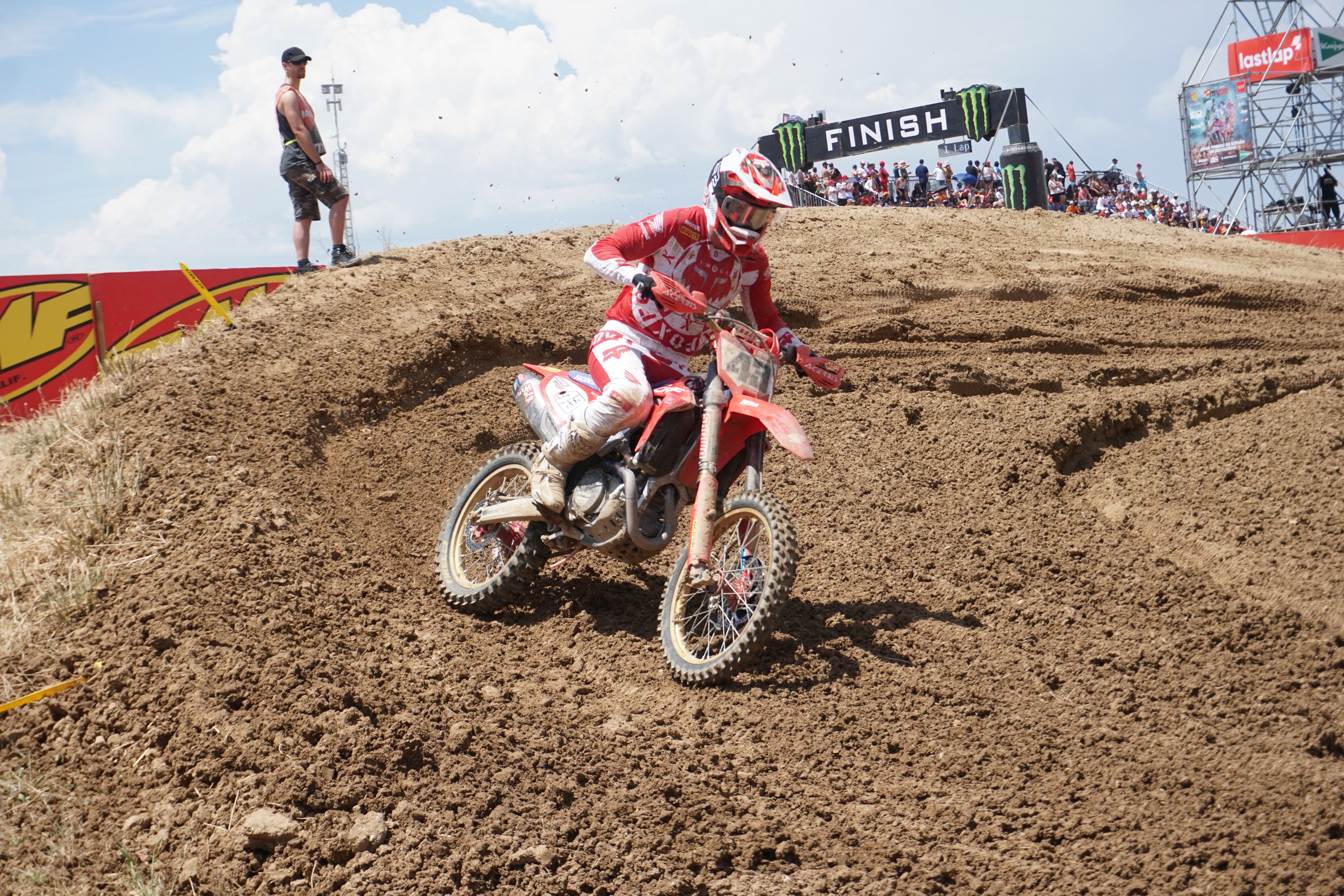
- Nationality: Australian
- Born: 10 November 1998 (age 28); Cairns, Australia
- Bike number: 43

Mitchell Evans (born 10 November 1998) is an Australian professional Motocross racer. Evans competed in the FIM Motocross World Championship from the 2019 season until 2023, initially in the MX2 class but more recently in MXGP.

Evans has represented Australia at the Motocross des Nations three times, included within this is a third-place finish with the team at the 2022 edition. He is a two-time podium finisher in the MX2 class of the FIM Motocross World Championship and has had stints as a factory rider for both Honda and Kawasaki.

Before competing in the World Championship, Evans won the MXD championship in Australia in 2016. He was runner-up in the MX1 class of ProMX in 2018.

Evans is the younger brother of Richie Evans, who has also raced motocross professionally in Australia.

== Career ==
=== Junior career ===
Evans first began riding on his families farm in North Queensland with elder brother Richie as well as future Australian Supercross Champion Jackson Richardson. Throughout his early competitive years on smaller capacity machines he regularly competed against other future international stars of his generation including Wilson Todd, Jed Beaton and Hunter Lawrence. In 2010, he represented Australia at the FIM Motocross Junior World Championship in France finishing sixth overall in the 65cc class. Two years later, he again attended the event – this time in the 85cc class, finishing ninth overall.

In 2014, while riding for the official KTM Australia team, Evans was able to win two titles at that season's Australian Junior Motocross Championship. The following year, he would partner Wilson Todd at the GYTR Yamaha team to compete in the MXD class nationally. His first season in the class was hampered by injuries, but in 2016, he was able to end the year as champion of the class. Following this, when he had already started racing the supercross series domestically, Evans received a last minute call-up to represent his nation at the 2016 Motocross des Nations due to an injury picked up by Jed Beaton. At just 17 years of age and with only five days notice before the event, Evans formed part of the Australian team that would ultimately finish eighth overall.

=== Professional in Australia ===
For the 2017 season, Evans moved to the Serco Yamaha team in the MX2 class of the Australian Motul MX Nationals and the Australian Supercross Championship. He was immediately competitive in the MX2 class, finishing on the podium at the opening round and going through a four-race winning streak at one point during the season. He went into the final round still in contention for the title, but ultimately would finish third in the final standings. In that season's Australian Supercross Championship, he would suffer multiple vertebrae fractures in his lower back and two fractures to his pelvic bone after a mid-air collision with Aaron Tanti.

Following this, Evans moved team, manufacturer and class for 2018, signing for the Raceline KTM team to race in the MX1 class. In his rookie season on a 450, Evans was able to record several podium finishes to eventually come away as runner-up to runaway champion Dean Ferris. On the back of this, Evans was chosen to represent Australia at the 2018 Motocross des Nations in Red Bud. As the Open class rider on a 450, Evans finished tenth and fourteenth in the main races on the Sunday to contribute to his nation finishing fourth overall.

=== World Championship career ===
As a result of his results in Australia and at the 2018 Motocross des Nations, Evans received attention from the FIM Motocross World Championship paddock, particularly from the Honda 114 Motorsports team. After being released from his contract with Raceline KTM in Australia, Evans signed for the factory-supported team ran by Livia Lancelot to drop back down to a 250 and race in the MX2 class for the 2019 FIM Motocross World Championship season. He adapted quickly to this, podiuming at the pre-season Lacapelle Marival International event before finishing third overall at the opening round of the World Championship season. After podiuming on his Grand prix debut, he picked up a second podium later in the season in Portugal, before missing several mid-year rounds due to injury and ultimately finishing eleventh in the standings.

These performances were enough for Evans to be promoted to the factory Honda Team HRC for the 2020 FIM Motocross World Championship in the MXGP class, returning to a 450. Like the previous season, he again had a strong opening round, finishing third in the very first race of the year. After a dip in form over the next three rounds, he started to become a consistent top-six rider as the season progressed. At the first race of the Spanish round, Evans suffered a big crash while running in fourth resulting in an injury to his left wrist. After missing the rest of the 2020 season, it was hoped that Evans could return to racing for the 2021 MXGP championship. However, complications with the healing of his wrist injury meant that additional surgery was required. This produced the nightmare situation for Evans where he also missed the entire 2021 season.

Despite his injury woes, Team HRC retained Evans for the 2022 FIM Motocross World Championship season. He was able to compete at every round of the MXGP championship in 2022 and despite such a long time away from competitive action, managed to produce some noteworthy performances. Running regularly up towards the front of the pack, recording several top-six finishes and winning the Saturday qualifying race in Sweden all contributed to Evans finishing tenth in the final standings. Following this, Evans was selected to compete at the 2022 Motocross des Nations for Australia alongside the Lawrence brothers. After finishing fourth in his Saturday qualifying race, Evans and his teammates were able to finish third overall in the final standings after Sunday's main races.

For the 2023 FIM Motocross World Championship, Evans moved to Kawasaki, where he competed for their factory team alongside Romain Febvre. He endured a tough start to his season, missing the first four rounds due to a thumb injury sustained pre-season. Upon his return he gradually improved and placed sporadically inside the top-ten, with a single sixth place in the second race in Germany being his best result. Persistent pain from his old wrist injury meant Evans missed the final two rounds of the season after struggling in the Turkish round. By this time, it had already been announced that Evans' time with Kawasaki had come to an end after a single season, with his spot being taken by Jeremy Seewer in 2024.

=== Comeback ===
After not racing at all throughout the most part of 2024, Evans reappeared racing some German supercross rounds for the Luke's Racing - Hertrampf Gruppe team over the winter of 2024–2025. Following this, Evans stayed with the team to race the 2025 ADAC MX Masters. Prior to this, Evans raced two rounds of the 2025 FIM Motocross World Championship, scoring a single point at the MXGP of Trentino. His campaign in the ADAC MX Masters ended at the first round, where a crash caused bruising to his lungs as well as shoulder injuries.

== Honours ==
Motocross des Nations

- Team Overall: (Australia) 2022 (bronze)

ProMX

- MX1: 2018 (silver)
- MX2: 2017 (bronze)
- MXD: 2016 (gold)

Australian Junior Motocross Championships

- 250cc 15yrs: 2014 (gold)
- 125cc 15yrs: 2014 (gold)

== Career statistics ==
=== Motocross des Nations ===
Year	Location	Nation	Class	Teammates	Team Overall	Individual Overall
2016	(Italy) Maggiora	AUS	MX2	Todd Waters; Dean Ferris	8th	19th
2018	(United States) Red Bud	AUS	Open	Kirk Gibbs; Hunter Lawrence	4th	7th
2022	(United States) Red Bud	AUS	MXGP	Hunter Lawrence; Jett Lawrence	3rd	9th

=== FIM Motocross World Championship ===
==== By season ====
Season	Class	Number	Motorcycle	Team	Race	Race Wins	Overall Wins	Race Top-3	Overall Podium	Pts	Plcd
2019	MX2	43	Honda	Honda 114 Motorsports	28	0	0	2	2	279	11th
2020	MXGP	43	Honda	Team HRC	22	0	0	1	0	228	14th
2022	MXGP	43	Honda	Team HRC	35	0	0	0	0	308	10th
2023	MXGP	43	Kawasaki	Kawasaki Racing Team MXGP	26	0	0	0	0	235	16th
2025	MXGP	43	Honda	Luke's Racing Team - Hertrampf Gruppe	4	0	0	0	0	1	56th
Total					115	0	0	3	2	1051	
