= 2018 FIM Enduro World Championship =

The 2018 World Enduro Championship is the 29th season of the FIM World Enduro Championship. The season consists of eight events.

The series returns to the three class structure that it previously held in 2016. The Enduro 1, Enduro 2 and Enduro 3 classes will return, with the EnduroGP being an overall standing across all three classes.

For the first time in the history of the series, a 'hard enduro' event will be on the calendar. 'The Wall' hard enduro event in Italy will act as the fifth round of the series. Steve Holcombe goes into the championship after winning the EnduroGP class in 2017. Josep García is the reigning champion from Enduro 2.

== Calendar ==
An eight-round calendar was announced.

Round	Event	Location	Dates
1	Finland	Päijänne	17–18 March
2	Spain	Santiago de Compostela	27–29 April
3	Portugal	Castelo Branco	4–6 May
4	Estonia	Tallinn	1–3 June
5	(Italy) Trentino	Arco, Trentino	30 June
6	Italy	Edolo	31 August - 2 September
7	France	Methamis	22–23 September
8	Germany	Rudersdorf	12–14 October

== EnduroGP ==
=== Riders Championship ===
Pos	Rider	Bike	Class	FIN (Finland)		ESP (Spain)		POR (Portugal)		EST (Estonia)		ITA (Italy)	ITA (Italy)		FRA (France)		GER (Germany)		Points
1	(United Kingdom) Holcombe	Beta	Enduro 3	6	6	6	1	6	2	3	2	2	1	1	2	1	1	1	248
2	(United Kingdom) Freeman	Beta	Enduro 1	10	7	7	8	4	4	1	3	6	2	2	3	7	2	3	201
3	(Finland) Remes	TM	Enduro 2	4	1	2	5	8	5	2	Ret	8	3	7	4	3	3	5	193
4	(Italy) Salvini	Husqvarna	Enduro 2	15	9	1	3	1	1	4	1	1	Ret	3	1	12	5	Ret	190
5	(France) Larrieu	Yamaha	Enduro 2	22	16	3	4	7	7	7	4	3	5	12	5	5	4	2	159
6	(United Kingdom) J. McCanney	Yamaha	Enduro 1	7	12	4	2	2	6	5	8	Ret	4	8	6	8	7	7	151
7	(France) Nambotin	Gas Gas	Enduro 3	23	17	11	7	3	3	14	5	11	9	5	8	2	10	8	124
8	(United Kingdom) D. McCanney	Gas Gas	Enduro 3	24	11	5	22	9	9	6	6	4	13	11	7	6	6	4	116
9	(Italy) Oldrati	Honda	Enduro 2	26	18	13	13	12	10	8	9	9	6	4	9	11	13	9	84
10	(France) Basset	Gas Gas	Enduro 1	17	20	9	9	11	11	9	10	14	8	9	12	10	11	11	74
11	(France) Geslin	Beta	Enduro 3			18	15	15	12	10	11	16	10	10	10	13	9	10	51
12	(France) Charlier	Beta	Enduro 2	27	21	25	6	17	8	15	7	Ret	11	Ret	Ret	4	Ret	Ret	47
13	(Italy) Guarneri	Honda	Enduro 1	32	25	8	18	Ret	Ret				12	14	11	9	8	6	44
14	(Finland) Jukola	KTM	Enduro 3	1	3					20	14								38
15	(Finland) Eriksson	KTM	Enduro 3	2	4														32
16	(Italy) Redondi	Honda	Enduro 2									5	7	6					31
17	(Italy) Philippaerts	Beta	Enduro 2	16	19	15	14	19	14	13	12	10	14	13	14	16	14	13	30
18	(Finland) Pohjola	Gas Gas	Enduro 1	Ret	2	17	17	21	17	16	Ret	22	18	18	16	15	12	12	27
19	(Australia) Phillips	Sherco	Enduro 2	21	14	10	11	10	15	12	Ret								24
20	(France) Bellino	Honda	Enduro 2					5	Ret			7							21
21	(Finland) Himmanen	Gas Gas	Enduro 3	5	8														20
22	(Finland) Tamminen	Gas Gas	Enduro 3	3	Ret														16
23	(Finland) Olenius	TM	Enduro 1	Ret	5					21	20								12
24	(Finland) Tarkkala	TM	Enduro 3	8	13														11
25	(Spain) Guerrero	Yamaha	Enduro 1			12	12	13	Ret										11
26	(Finland) Leino	KTM	Enduro 1	12	10	21	21	Ret	Ret	Ret	Ret								10
27	(Finland) Arvaja	Sherco	Enduro 1	9	15														8
28	(United Kingdom) Snow	Honda	Enduro 1							11	13		21	Ret					8
29	(Portugal) Oliveira	Yamaha	Enduro 2			20	10	Ret	Ret										6
30	(France) Dumontier	Yamaha	Enduro 3			16	Ret	18	13				17	21	15	14	21	DNS	6
31	(Finland) Järvinen	Yamaha	Enduro 1	11	22														5
32	(South Africa) Young	Sherco	Enduro 3									12							4
33	(France) Lafont	Honda	Enduro 1												13	17			3
34	(Italy) Battig	Kawasaki	Enduro 2									13	Ret	DNS					3
35	(Finland) Oikari	Honda	Enduro 2	13	28														3
36	(Germany) Brockel	KTM	Enduro 2														15	14	3
37	(Italy) Monni	Suzuki	Enduro 1			14	20	16	Ret	17	16	15	16	19	19	20	Ret	18	3
38	(Portugal) Ventura	Honda	Enduro 2			19	16	14	Ret										2
39	(Finland) Aitta	Honda	Enduro 1	14	26	24	Ret			Ret	Ret								2
40	(Italy) Nicoletti	Husqvarna	Enduro 1										15	15					2
41	(Germany) Huebner	KTM	Enduro 2										20	24			16	15	1
42	(Estonia) Leok	Yamaha	Enduro 1							18	15								1
Pos	Rider	Bike	Class	FIN (Finland)		ESP (Spain)		POR (Portugal)		EST (Estonia)		ITA (Italy)	ITA (Italy)		FRA (France)		GER (Germany)		Points

== Enduro 1 ==
=== Entry list ===
Team	Constructor	No	Rider	Rounds
Team MP Racing	Sherco	2	(Finland) Jussi Arvaja	1, 4
Team Yamaha Zone Rouge	Yamaha	2	(Belgium) Cedric Cremer	2
Gabrielli Extreme Team	Husqvarna	5	(Italy) Diego Nicoletti	6
Team VSM Off-Road	Beta	5	(France) Stephane Milachon	7
Team Motopalvelu	KTM	6	(Finland) Jani Salonen	1
Team Motopalvelu	KTM	36	(Finland) Dick Bergman	1
Team Motopalvelu	KTM	71	(Finland) Jarno Koskela	1
Gas Gas Factory Racing	Gas Gas	8	(France) Antoine Basset	All
Gas Gas Factory Racing	Gas Gas	46	(Finland) Eemil Pohjola	All
Huolto-Kaksikko Racing	Yamaha	10	(Finland) Kalle Järvinen	1
	KTM	10	(Estonia) Timo Hermlin	4
	Yamaha	11	(Estonia) Aigar Leok	4
Beta MC Racing	Beta	11	(Italy) Gianluca Martini	5–6
Costa Ligure Beta Boano Racing	Beta	12	(United Kingdom) Bradley Freeman	All
Suzuki Valenti Lunigiana Team	Suzuki	13	(Italy) Manuel Monni	2–8
KTM GST Berlin	KTM	14	(Germany) Robert Riedel	8
Racingbike KTM	KTM	15	(Finland) Jiri Leino	1–4
Racingbike KTM	KTM	32	(Finland) Teemu Latostenmaa	1
Honda Racing RedMoto World Enduro Team	Honda	31	(United Kingdom) Alex Snow	4, 6
Honda Racing RedMoto World Enduro Team	Honda	39	(Italy) Davide Guarneri.	1–3, 6–8
Team Bike World	Honda	32	(Finland) Niko Aitta	2–4
Outsiders Yamaha Support Team	Yamaha	51	(France) Mathieu Doveze	7
	Sherco	52	(Estonia) Veiko Raats	4
TTM Factory Racing	KTM	58	(Finland) Paavo Henriksson	1
Acerbis.fi	Yamaha	61	(Finland) Aleksi Nieminen	1
	Husqvarna	66	(Italy) Roberto Minetti	6
Outsiders Yamaha Official Enduro Team	Yamaha	68	(United Kingdom) Jamie McCanney	All
Nostinpojat TM Racing Finland	TM	70	(Finland) Henry Olenius	1, 4
Team Sissi Racing	KTM	87	(Italy) Michele Flaviani	6
Control Tech ORC Team	Honda	88	(France) Yohan Lafont	7
TNT Corse	KTM	91	(Italy) Tommaso Montanari	6
Yamaha 96 Racing Team	Yamaha	96	(Spain) Victor Guerrero	2–3
Team Bike World	Honda	99	(Finland) Niko Aitta	1

=== Riders Championship ===
Pos	Rider	Bike	FIN (Finland)		ESP (Spain)		POR (Portugal)		EST (Estonia)		ITA (Italy)	ITA (Italy)		FRA (France)		GER (Germany)		Points
1	(United Kingdom) Freeman	Beta	3	3	2	2	2	1	1	1	1	1	1	1	1	1	1	286
2	(United Kingdom) McCanney	Yamaha	1	5	1	1	1	2	2	2	Ret	2	2	2	2	2	3	252
3	(France) Basset	Gas Gas	7	7	4	3	3	3	3	3	2	3	3	4	4	4	4	218
4	(Finland) Pohjola	Gas Gas	Ret	1	7	5	6	4	5	Ret	4	7	7	6	5	5	5	155
5	(Italy) Guarneri	Honda	13	10	3	6	Ret	Ret				4	4	3	3	3	2	129
6	(Italy) Monni	Suzuki			6	7	5	Ret	6	6	3	6	8	7	7	Ret	6	113
7	(Finland) Arvaja	Sherco	2	6					10	8								42
8	(Finland) Leino	KTM	5	4	8	8	Ret	Ret	Ret	Ret								42
9	(Spain) Guerrero	Yamaha			5	4	4	Ret										40
10	(United Kingdom) Snow	Honda							4	4		8	Ret					36
11	(Finland) Olenius	TM	Ret	2					8	7								35
12	(Finland) Aitta	Honda	6	11	10	Ret	7	Ret	Ret	Ret								30
13	(Italy) Nicoletti	Husqvarna										5	5					24
14	(Finland) Järvinen	Yamaha	4	8														22
15	(France) Lafont	Honda												5	6			22
16	(Estonia) Leok	Yamaha							7	5								21
17	(Germany) Riedel	KTM														6	7	19
18	(France) Doveze	Yamaha												8	8			16
19	(Italy) Flaviani	KTM										9	10					13
20	(Finland) Bergman	KTM	8	12														12
21	(Estonia) Hermlin	KTM							11	9								12
22	(Italy) Martini	Beta									Ret	Ret	6					10
23	(Finland) Latostenmaa	KTM	9	13														10
24	(Finland) Henriksson	KTM	10	14														8
25	(Italy) Montanari	KTM										Ret	9					7
26	(Estonia) Raats	Sherco							9	Ret								7
27	(Belgium) Cremer	Yamaha			9	Ret												7
28	(Finland) Salonen	KTM	Ret	9														7
29	(Finland) Nieminen	Yamaha	11	15														6
30	(Finland) Koskela	KTM	12	16														4
	(Italy) Minetti	Husqvarna										Ret	Ret					0
	(France) Milachon	Beta												Ret	DNS			0
Pos	Rider	Bike	FIN (Finland)		ESP (Spain)		POR (Portugal)		EST (Estonia)		ITA (Italy)	ITA (Italy)		FRA (France)		GER (Germany)		Points

== Enduro 2 ==
=== Entry list ===
Team	Constructor	No	Rider	Rounds
	KTM	3	(Estonia) Martin Leok	4
Outsiders Yamaha Official Enduro Team	Yamaha	4	(France) Loïc Larrieu	All
JET Team	Husqvarna	9	(Italy) Alex Salvini	All
Honda Racing RedMoto World Enduro Team	Honda	18	(Italy) Giacomo Redondi	5–6
Honda Racing RedMoto World Enduro Team	Honda	22	(Italy) Thomas Oldrati	All
CH Racing Sherco	Sherco	19	(Australia) Matthew Phillips	1–4
Team Beta Factory Racing	Beta	23	(France) Christophe Charlier	All
ORT Yamaha	Yamaha	31	(Portugal) Luis Oliveira	2–3
TM Factory Racing	TM	34	(Finland) Eero Remes	All
TM Racing UK	TM	40	(United Kingdom) Joshua Gotts	All
Team Ykkos-MP	KTM	41	(Finland) Ossi Halonen	1
Costa Ligure Beta Boano Racing	Beta	44	(Italy) Deny Philippaerts	All
	Beta	45	(Italy) Matteo Pedersoli	6
Team Sturm Zschopau	KTM	48	(Germany) Edward Huebner	6, 8
	Honda	52	(Portugal) Diogo Ventura	2–3
Lunigiana Suzuki Valenti	Suzuki	57	(Italy) Oscar Balletti	5
	Beta	59	(Estonia) Juri Triisa	4
Control Tech ORC Team	Honda	69	(France) Mathias Bellino	3, 5
Control Tech ORC Team	Honda	69	(France) Cedric Soubeyras	7
Team Klim Yamaha	Yamaha	70	(France) Nicolas Deparrois	7
KTM GST Berlin	KTM	71	(Germany) Christian Brockel	8
	KTM	74	(Latvia) Ivo Steinbergs	4
SE Team	Honda	75	(Finland) Matti Oikari	1
E50 Racing	Kawasaki	83	(Italy) Alessandro Battig	5–6
Jarsen Enduro Team	KTM	92	(Czech Republic) Patrik Markvart	5–6
Team BvZ Racing	KTM	92	(Germany) Davide von Zitzewitz	8
	KTM	96	(Italy) Michele Musso	6

=== Riders Championship ===
Pos	Rider	Bike	FIN (Finland)		ESP (Spain)		POR (Portugal)		EST (Estonia)		ITA (Italy)	ITA (Italy)		FRA (France)		GER (Germany)		Points
1	(Finland) Remes	TM	1	1	2	3	4	2	1	Ret	5	1	4	2	1	1	2	248
2	(France) Larrieu	Yamaha	7	4	3	2	3	3	3	2	2	2	5	3	3	2	1	241
3	(Italy) Salvini	Husqvarna	3	2	1	1	1	1	2	1	1	Ret	1	1	5	3	Ret	240
4	(Italy) Oldrati	Honda	9	5	5	7	6	5	4	4	6	3	2	4	4	4	3	192
5	(Italy) Philippaerts	Beta	4	6	6	8	9	6	6	5	7	6	6	5	6	5	4	158
6	(United Kingdom) Gotts	TM	5	8	9	10	10	8	9	7	9	9	8	7	7	9	7	119
7	(France) Charlier	Beta	10	7	10	4	8	4	7	3	Ret	5	Ret	Ret	2	Ret	Ret	112
8	(Australia) Phillips	Sherco	6	3	4	6	5	7	5	Ret								83
9	(Italy) Redondi	Honda									3	4	3					46
10	(Germany) Huebner	KTM										8	9			7	6	34
11	(France) Bellino	Honda					2	Ret			4							32
12	(Finland) Oikari	Honda	2	9														25
13	(Portugal) Ventura	Honda			7	9	7	Ret										25
14	(Czech Republic) Markvart	KTM									11	7	7					23
15	(Germany) Brockel	KTM														6	5	22
16	(Portugal) Oliveira	Yamaha			8	5	Ret	Ret										20
17	(Estonia) Leok	KTM							8	6								18
18	(Germany) von Zitzewitz	KTM														8	8	16
19	(Finland) Halonen	KTM	8	10														14
20	(Italy) Musso	KTM										10	10					12
21	(France) Deparrois	Yamaha												6	Ret			10
22	(France) Soubeyras	Honda												DNS	8			8
23	(Italy) Battig	Kawasaki									8	Ret	DNS					8
24	(Italy) Balletti	Suzuki									10							6
25	(Latvia) Steinbergs	KTM							10	Ret								6
26	(Estonia) Triisa	Beta							11	Ret								5
	(Italy) Pedersoli	Beta										Ret	Ret					0
Pos	Rider	Bike	FIN (Finland)		ESP (Spain)		POR (Portugal)		EST (Estonia)		ITA (Italy)	ITA (Italy)		FRA (France)		GER (Germany)		Points

== Enduro 3 ==
=== Entry list ===
Team	Constructor	No	Rider	Rounds
Team Beta Factory Racing	Beta	1	(United Kingdom) Steve Holcombe	All
	Husqvarna	3	(Italy) Matteo Cura	6
	KTM	5	(Estonia) Elary Talu	4
Gas Gas Factory Team	Gas Gas	7	(France) Christophe Nambotin	All
Gas Gas Factory Team	Gas Gas	43	(United Kingdom) Daniel McCanney	All
Redmoto RC	Husqvarna	18	(Estonia) Toomas Triisa	4
Team Sima Moto	Gas Gas	21	(France) Jean-Charles Schneider	6–7
Nostinpojat TM Racing Finland	TM	25	(Finland) Marko Tarkkala	1
KTM GST Berlin	KTM	32	(Germany) Bjorn Feldt	8
KTM GST Berlin	KTM	65	(Germany) Nico Rambow	8
Team Everlast Welds	Gas Gas	37	(Finland) Mika Tamminen	1
	Gas Gas	46	(Finland) Henri Himmanen	1
Racingbike KTM	KTM	48	(Finland) Aleksi Jukola	1, 4
Racingbike KTM	KTM	88	(Finland) Toni Eriksson	1
Sherco Racing Factory	Sherco	55	(South Africa) Wade Young	5
	Beta	55	(Italy) Nicola Lanza	6
Team Beta Motor France	Beta	64	(France) Anthony Geslin	2–8
	Beta	77	(Finland) Janne Haapasalo	1
Entrophy Motorbike	Beta	80	(Italy) Nicolo Mori	6
JET Team	Husqvarna	89	(Argentina) Christian Arriegada	5–7
Dumontier Racing	Yamaha	93	(France) Romain Dumontier	2–3, 6–8
	KTM	94	(Czech Republic) Jiri Hadek	5–6

=== Riders Championship ===
Pos	Rider	Bike	FIN (Finland)		ESP (Spain)		POR (Portugal)		EST (Estonia)		ITA (Italy)	ITA (Italy)		FRA (France)		GER (Germany)		Points
1	(United Kingdom) Holcombe	Beta	5	3	2	1	2	1	1	1	1	1	1	1	1	1	1	284
2	(France) Nambotin	Gas Gas	7	7	3	2	1	2	4	2	3	2	2	3	2	4	3	238
3	(United Kingdom) McCanney	Gas Gas	8	5	1	4	3	3	2	3	2	4	4	2	3	2	2	236
4	(France) Geslin	Beta			5	3	4	4	3	4	5	3	3	4	4	3	4	188
5	(France) Dumontier	Yamaha			4	Ret	5	5				5	6	5	5	6	DNS	94
6	(Finland) Jukola	KTM	1	1					5	5								64
7	(Argentina) Arriegada	Husqvarna									7	8	7	6	7			45
8	(Finland) Eriksson	KTM	2	2														36
9	(Finland) Himmanen	Gas Gas	4	4														28
10	(Czech Republic) Hadek	KTM									6	7	8					27
11	(Germany) Feldt	KTM														5	5	24
12	(Italy) Mori	Beta										6	5					22
13	(Estonia) Talu	KTM							6	6								20
14	(Finland) Tarkkala	TM	6	6														20
15	(Germany) Rambow	KTM														7	6	19
16	(Estonia) Triisa	Husqvarna							7	7								18
17	(France) Schneider	Gas Gas										9	Ret	Ret	6			17
18	(Finland) Tamminen	Gas Gas	3	Ret														16
19	(Finland) Haapasalo	Beta	9	8														15
20	(South Africa) Young	Sherco									4							14
21	(Italy) Lanza	Beta										Ret	9					7
	(Italy) Cura	Husqvarna										Ret	DNS					0
Pos	Rider	Bike	FIN (Finland)		ESP (Spain)		POR (Portugal)		EST (Estonia)		ITA (Italy)	ITA (Italy)		FRA (France)		GER (Germany)		Points

== Junior ==
=== Calendar ===
Round	Event	Location	Dates
1	Spain	Santiago de Compostela	27–29 April
2	Portugal	Castelo Branco	4–6 May
3	Estonia	Tallinn	1–3 June
4	(Italy) Trentino	Arco, Trentino	30 June
5	Italy	Edolo	31 August - 2 September
6	France	Methamis	22–23 September
7	Germany	Rüdersdorf	12–14 October

=== Riders Championship ===
Pos	Rider	Bike	Class	ESP (Spain)		POR (Portugal)		EST (Estonia)		ITA (Italy)	ITA (Italy)		FRA (France)		GER (Germany)		Points
1	(Italy) Cavallo	Beta	Junior 2	1	3	1	1	2	1	1	1	1	1	1	2	4	198
2	(Italy) Verona	TM	Junior 1	2	1	2	6	3	9	2	2	2	3	3	4	5	172
3	(United Kingdom) Wootton	Husqvarna	Junior 2	5	16	7	8	7	16	3	Ret	3	2	2	3	2	140
4	(France) Espinasse	Sherco	Junior 1	22	4	3	20	1	3	7	11	4	4	9	12	1	135
5	(Italy) Soreca	TM	Junior 2	7	2	17	2	5	2	6			8	4	6	3	133
6	(United Kingdom) Edmondson	Sherco	Junior 2	3	8	11	12	4	4	4	3	6	6	5	7	6	125
7	(Spain) Mirabet	Honda	Junior 1	6	10	8	3	12	5	Ret	5	13	5	13	10	16	89
8	(Belgium) Magain	KTM	Junior 1	9	6	6	4	11	11	10	6	8	7	14	Ret	13	84
9	(France) Abgrall	Sherco	Junior 2	11	5	13	11	6	6	11	Ret	5	9	10	8	10	81
10	(Spain) Schareina	Husqvarna	Junior 2	10	Ret	10	9	10	10		17	11	10	6	5	8	72
11	(Spain) Francisco	KTM	Junior 2	4	12	5	5	Ret	Ret		12	14			9	11	60
12	(France) Le Quere	TM	Junior 1	13	14	12	7	22	13		4	7	15	12			49
13	(Finland) Hanninen	Husqvarna	Junior 1	14	11	15	15	8	8		9	10	13	17	13	12	47
14	(Italy) Fachetti	Honda	Junior 1	Ret	7	Ret	13	13	15	5	Ret	18	12	7			41
15	(Brazil) Crivilin	KTM	Junior 1	15	13	4	10	14	12		Ret	DNS	14	15	17	Ret	33
16	(Australia) Ruprecht	Yamaha	Junior 1												1	7	29
17	(Italy) Macoritto	Husqvarna	Junior 1							8	7	9					24
18	(Sweden) Appelqvist	Yamaha	Junior 1					9	7	12							20
19	(Finland) Jukola	Husqvarna	Junior 1	16	15	9	14	15	14	9							20
20	(France) Passet	Yamaha	Junior 1	12	9	14	17	18	19		14	16	17	16	15	Ret	16
21	(South Africa) Flanagan	Yamaha	Junior 1								15	17	11	11	14	14	15
22	(France) Nicolot	Yamaha	Junior 1	8	Ret	19	Ret				10	Ret					14
23	(Poland) Olszowy	KTM	Junior 2												11	9	12
24	(Spain) Sans	KTM	Junior 2								16	15	Ret	8			9
25	(Czech Republic) Kouble	KTM	Junior 2								8	20					8
26	(France) Criq	TM	Junior 1								13	12	19	22			7
27	(Italy) Mancuso	Beta	Junior 1							13	18	21					3
28	(Estonia) Biene	Husqvarna	Junior 2	21	17			17	20	14	22	23	22	21	20	19	2
29	(United Kingdom) Etchells	Sherco	Junior 2												16	15	1
30	(Spain) Cortes	Honda	Junior 1	Ret	DNS	18	18			15							1
Pos	Rider	Bike	Class	ESP (Spain)		POR (Portugal)		EST (Estonia)		ITA (Italy)	ITA (Italy)		FRA (France)		GER (Germany)		Points

=== Entry list ===
Team	Constructor	No	Rider	Rounds
JET Team	Husqvarna	304	(Chile) Ruy Barbosa	2
Team TM XCentric France	TM	304	(France) Antoine Criq	5–6
Team TM XCentric France	TM	348	(France) Leo Le Quere	1–3, 5–6
Team Everlast Welding	Husqvarna	305	(Finland) Antti Hanninen	1–3, 5–7
Sherco Academy	Sherco	307	(France) Theophile Espinasse	All
Dumontier Racing	Yamaha	308	(France) Jean-Baptiste Nicolot	1–2, 5
Dumontier Racing	Yamaha	328	(France) Thibaut Passet	1–3, 5–7
Johansson MPE Yamaha	Yamaha	309	(Sweden) Erik Appelqvist	3–4
Johansson MPE Yamaha	Yamaha	317	(Australia) Will Ruprecht	7
Johansson MPE Yamaha	Yamaha	377	(South Africa) Kyle Flanagan	5–7
Orange BH KTM	KTM	311	(Brazil) Bruno Crivilin	1–3, 5–7
Bonneton 2 Roue	Yamaha	315	(France) Maxime Sot	6
HCT Automotive	KTM	317	(Latvia) Gints Filipsons	3
Team Örthén	Yamaha	330	(Finland) Eemil Helander	3
Honda Redmoto World Enduro Team	Honda	332	(Italy) Emanuele Fachetti	All
	Yamaha	333	(Brazil) Patrik Reginaldo	1–2
E50 Racing	Kawasaki	336	(Italy) Maurizio Martinelli	4–5
RFME Junior Team	Honda	338	(Spain) Kirian Mirabet	All
RFME Junior Team	Sherco	360	(Spain) Alonso Trigo	1–3, 7
DMSB Junior Team	KTM	366	(Germany) Yanik Spachmüller	5, 7
MP69 Racing Team	KTM	369	(Sweden) Mikael Persson	1
Boano Racing Sport	Beta	370	(Italy) Giuliano Mancuso	4–5
Team Yamaha Zone Rouge	KTM	371	(Belgium) Antoine Magain	All
	Sherco	376	(New Zealand) Hamish MacDonald	2
Kytonen Motorsport	Husqvarna	384	(Finland) Lari Jukola	1–4
Kytonen Motorsport	Husqvarna	385	(Finland) Antti Ahtila	5–7
Team Honda Impala	Honda	386	(Spain) Bernat Cortes	1–2, 4
	KTM	393	(Czech Republic) Adolf Zivny	5, 7
	KTM	395	(Spain) Abel Carballi	1
HCenter Dal Bello	Husqvarna	395	(Italy) Lorenzo Macoritto	4–5
	Husqvarna	397	(France) Isaac Devoulx	6
BvZ Racing Team	KTM	398	(Germany) Jan Allers	2
TM Enduro Satellite Team	TM	399	(Italy) Andrea Verona	All

=== Riders Championship ===
Pos	Rider	Bike	ESP (Spain)		POR (Portugal)		EST (Estonia)		ITA (Italy)	ITA (Italy)		FRA (France)		GER (Germany)		Points
1	(Italy) Verona	TM	1	1	1	3	2	5	1	1	1	1	1	2	2	196
2	(France) Espinasse	Sherco	11	2	2	11	1	1	3	8	2	2	3	4	1	178
3	(Spain) Mirabet	Honda	2	6	5	1	6	2	Ret	3	8	3	6	3	7	146
4	(Belgium) Magain	KTM	4	3	4	2	5	6	6	4	4	4	7	Ret	5	138
5	(Finland) Hanninen	Husqvarna	7	7	9	8	3	4		6	6	7	10	5	4	111
6	(France) Le Quere	TM	6	9	7	4	13	8		2	3	9	5			104
7	(Italy) Fachetti	Honda	Ret	4	Ret	6	7	10	2	Ret	11	6	2			90
8	(Brazil) Crivilin	KTM	8	8	3	5	8	7		Ret	DNS	8	8	8	Ret	85
9	(France) Passet	Yamaha	5	5	8	9	11	12		10	9	10	9	7	Ret	79
10	(Finland) Jukola	Husqvarna	9	10	6	7	9	9	5							58
11	(South Africa) Flanagan	Yamaha								11	10	5	4	6	6	57
12	(Sweden) Appelqvist	Yamaha					4	3	7							39
13	(Italy) Macoritto	Husqvarna							4	5	5					38
14	(Australia) Ruprecht	Yamaha												1	3	36
15	(Spain) Trigo	Sherco	10	11	12	12	12	13						Ret	9	33
16	(France) Nicolot	Yamaha	3	Ret	11	Ret				7	Ret					30
17	(Finland) Ahtila	Husqvarna								14	12	13	11	9	8	29
18	(France) Criq	TM								9	7	12	12			24
19	(Spain) Cortes	Honda	Ret	DNS	10	10			9							19
20	(Italy) Mancuso	Beta							8	12	13					15
21	(Finland) Helander	Yamaha					10	11								11
22	(Czech Republic) Zivny	KTM								13	15			10	Ret	10
23	(Germany) Spachmüller	KTM								15	14			11	Ret	8
24	(Spain) Carballi	KTM	12	12												8
25	(Italy) Martinelli	Kawasaki							10	Ret	16					6
26	(France) Sot	Yamaha										11	Ret			5
27	(Latvia) Filipsons	KTM					14	14								4
28	(Brazil) Reginaldo	Yamaha	Ret	Ret	13	Ret										3
	(Sweden) Persson	KTM	Ret	DNS												0
	(France) Devoulx	Husqvarna										Ret	DNS			0
Pos	Rider	Bike	ESP (Spain)		POR (Portugal)		EST (Estonia)		ITA (Italy)	ITA (Italy)		FRA (France)		GER (Germany)		Points

=== Entry list ===
Team	Constructor	No	Rider	Rounds
RFME Junior Team	KTM	404	(Spain) Marc Sans	5–6
RFME Junior Team	KTM	412	(Spain) Enric Francisco	1–3, 5, 7
RFME Junior Team	Husqvarna	468	(Spain) Tosha Schareina	1–3, 5–7
TTR Officine Rigamonti	Sherco	407	(Italy) Mirko Spandre	All
Nunez Motor	Gas Gas	409	(Spain) Jorge Paradelo	1
TM Racing Factory Team	TM	410	(Italy) Davide Soreca	1–4, 6–7
	Beta	413	(Slovakia) Patrik Halgas	7
CH Racing Sherco Factory Racing	Sherco	419	(United Kingdom) Jack Edmondson	All
Costa Ligure Boano Beta Racing	Beta	425	(Italy) Matteo Cavallo	All
OTT Racing Team	Gas Gas	431	(France) Loic Pezzutti	1–2, 5
JET Zanardo	Husqvarna	432	(United Kingdom) Joe Wootton	All
Team Motopalvelu	KTM	447	(Finland) Joni Kaivolainen	3
MPS Racing	Sherco	447	(United Kingdom) Jed Etchells	7
RedMoto Estonia	Husqvarna	451	(Estonia) Priit Biene	1, 3–7
KTM Katowice	KTM	454	(Poland) Dominik Olszowy	7
Control Tech ORC Team	Honda	457	(France) Neels Theric	6
Sherco Academy	Sherco	462	(France) David Abgrall	All
Team Sima Moto	Gas Gas	466	(France) Valentin Richaud	6
Team ASR	Gas Gas	478	(France) Bastien Nugon	6
Team MCL	KTM	496	(France) Fabien Rousson	5
Jarsen Team	KTM	498	(Czech Republic) Krystof Kouble	5

=== Riders Championship ===
Pos	Rider	Bike	ESP (Spain)		POR (Portugal)		EST (Estonia)		ITA (Italy)	ITA (Italy)		FRA (France)		GER (Germany)		Points
1	(Italy) Cavallo	Beta	1	2	1	1	1	1	1	1	1	1	1	1	3	200
2	(United Kingdom) Wootton	Husqvarna	4	6	3	4	5	6	2	Ret	2	2	2	2	1	166
3	(Italy) Soreca	TM	5	1	7	2	3	2	4			4	3	4	2	160
4	(United Kingdom) Edmondson	Sherco	2	4	5	7	2	3	3	2	4	3	4	5	4	158
5	(France) Abgrall	Sherco	7	3	6	6	4	4	5	Ret	3	5	7	6	7	123
6	(Spain) Schareina	Husqvarna	6	Ret	4	5	6	5		6	5	6	5	3	5	120
7	(Spain) Francisco	KTM	3	5	2	3	Ret	Ret		4	6			7	8	103
8	(Estonia) Biene	Husqvarna	11	7			7	8	6	8	9	9	10	10	11	75
9	(Italy) Spandre	Sherco	8	8	8	8	9	9	7	Ret	DNS	11	11	11	12	70
10	(France) Pezzutti	Gas Gas	10	Ret	9	9				7	11					34
11	(Spain) Sans	KTM								5	7	Ret	6			31
12	(Czech Republic) Kouble	KTM								3	8					24
13	(Poland) Olszowy	KTM												8	6	18
14	(Finland) Kaivolainen	KTM					8	7								17
15	(France) Richaud	Gas Gas										7	9			16
16	(France) Theric	Honda										8	8			16
17	(United Kingdom) Etchells	Sherco												9	9	14
18	(Spain) Paradelo	Gas Gas	9	9												14
19	(France) Rousson	KTM								9	10					13
20	(Slovakia) Halgas	Beta												12	10	10
21	(France) Nugon	Gas Gas										10	DNS			6
Pos	Rider	Bike	ESP (Spain)		POR (Portugal)		EST (Estonia)		ITA (Italy)	ITA (Italy)		FRA (France)		GER (Germany)		Points

== Youth ==
=== Calendar ===
Round	Event	Location	Dates
1	Spain	Santiago de Compostela	27–29 April
2	Estonia	Tallinn	1–3 June
3	(Italy) Trentino	Arco, Trentino	30 June
4	Italy	Edolo	31 August - 2 September
5	France	Methamis	22–23 September
6	Germany	Rüdersdorf	12–14 October

=== Entry list ===
Team	Constructor	No	Rider	Rounds
Sherco Academy France	Sherco	602	(Belgium) Matthew van Oevelen	All
Sherco Academy France	Sherco	612	(France) Killian Lunier	1–2, 4–5
	KTM	603	(Czech Republic) Robert Friedrich	4, 6
Silvan Motorsport	Sherco	604	(Finland) Hermanni Haljala	2
KTM Scandinavia	KTM	605	(Sweden) Joakim Grelsson	1
	Beta	605	(Italy) Matteo Menchelli	3
Racespec KTM Portugal	KTM	609	(Portugal) Tomas Clemente	All
CH Racing Sherco Factory Racing	Sherco	611	(United Kingdom) Daniel Mundell	All
CH Racing Sherco Factory Racing	Sherco	676	(New Zealand) Hamish MacDonald	All
JET Team	Husqvarna	614	(Chile) Ruy Barbosa	All
Costa Ligure Beta Boano Racing	Beta	617	(Italy) Igor Brunengo	1, 3
RFME Junior Team	Husqvarna	617	(Spain) Alejandro Navarro	5
RFME Junior Team	Husqvarna	627	(Spain) Sergio Navarro	5
	Sherco	618	(Finland) Kosti Kirjavainen	2
Yamaha Off-Road Experience Team	Yamaha	619	(United Kingdom) Alex Walton	1, 4–6
Johansson Yamaha Official Junior Team	Yamaha	621	(Sweden) Marcus Adielsson	All
	Yamaha	622	(Finland) Nicklas Laankoski	2
	KTM	623	(Italy) Gianluca Caroli	3
Team Specia ASD	Sherco	623	(Italy) Tommaso Iaglitsch	4
TM XCentric France	TM	624	(France) Charly Mesnard	1
	TM	626	(Finland) Tino Nuuttinen	2
	Sherco	626	(Germany) Luca Fischeder	6
Kytonen Racing Team	Husqvarna	628	(Finland) Hugo Svard	All
Kytonen Racing Team	Husqvarna	691	(Finland) Roni Kytonen	All
Sherco Academy	Sherco	632	(France) Melvin Monzo	1–2
Sherco Academy	Sherco	634	(France) Robin Filhol	1–2, 4–6
Team Sissi Racing	KTM	652	(Italy) Ramon Bregoli	1, 3–4
Osellini Moto	Husqvarna	666	(Italy) Claudio Spanu	4
Team Sturm Zschopau	KTM	667	(Germany) Florian Goerner	1, 4, 6
TTR Officine Rigamonti	Sherco	671	(Italy) Enrico Rinaldi	All
JRB Off-Road Centre	Sherco	674	(Spain) Adria Mesas	1, 5
JRB Off-Road Centre	Sherco	692	(Spain) Adria Sanchez	1, 4–5
JRB Off-Road Centre	Sherco	699	(Spain) Gerard Gomez	2–3, 5
KTM Enduro Academy	KTM	690	(Spain) David Riera	1
BvZ Racing Team	KTM	698	(Germany) Jan Allers	1–2, 6

=== Riders Championship ===
Pos	Rider	Bike	ESP (Spain)		EST (Estonia)		ITA (Italy)	ITA (Italy)		FRA (France)		GER (Germany)		Points
1	(Chile) Barbosa	Husqvarna	3	3	1	1	1	2	5	1	1	1	1	158
2	(New Zealand) MacDonald	Sherco	4	4	5	2	6	1	1	4	5	2	2	136
3	(United Kingdom) Mundell	Sherco	10	Ret	2	4	2	3	2	2	4	4	3	132
4	(Belgium) van Oevelen	Sherco	2	1	4	5	3	Ret	3	6	10	5	Ret	118
5	(Finland) Kytonen	Husqvarna	7	6	3	3	5	6	4	7	2	3	4	116
6	(Finland) Svard	Husqvarna	6	2	6	7	7	4	7	9	8	6	6	90
7	(France) Filhol	Sherco	8	7	7	8		9	9	5	7	7	8	72
8	(Sweden) Adielsson	Yamaha	14	5	10	9	8	7	6	15	13	8	7	69
9	(Spain) Gomez	Sherco			9	6	4			3	6			57
10	(United Kingdom) Walton	Yamaha	9	9				8	10	10	12	9	5	57
11	(France) Lunier	Sherco	12	12	12	11		10	11	11	11			38
12	(Italy) Rinaldi	Sherco	13	Ret	13	13	11	14	13	16	15	13	9	29
13	(Sweden) Grelsson	KTM	1	11										25
14	(Spain) S. Navarro	Husqvarna								8	3			24
15	(Portugal) Clemente	KTM	DNS	DNS	15	15	12	13	17	13	16	10	13	21
16	(Italy) Spanu	Husqvarna						5	8					20
17	(Germany) Goerner	KTM	19	8				Ret	16			11	10	19
18	(Spain) Riera	KTM	5	10										18
19	(Germany) Allers	KTM	11	13	Ret	10						14	Ret	16
20	(Italy) Bregoli	KTM	17	16			10	11	12					15
21	(Czech Republic) Friedrich	KTM						12	14			12	11	15
22	(Spain) A. Navarro	Husqvarna								12	9			11
23	(Finland) Laankoski	Yamaha			11	12								9
24	(Finland) Kirjavainen	Sherco			8	Ret								8
25	(Italy) Menchelli	Beta					9							7
26	(France) Monzo	Sherco	15	14	14	14								7
27	(Spain) Sanchez	Sherco	18	15				Ret	15	14	14			6
28	(Germany) Fischeder	Sherco										Ret	12	4
	(Italy) Brunengo	Beta	16	17			Ret							0
	(Spain) Mesas	Sherco	Ret	DNS						Ret	17			0
	(France) Mesnard	TM	20	Ret										0
	(Italy) Iaglitsch	Sherco						Ret	Ret					0
	(Finland) Haljala	Sherco			Ret	DNS								0
	(Finland) Nuuttinen	TM			Ret	DNS								0
	(Italy) Caroli	KTM					Ret							0
Pos	Rider	Bike	ESP (Spain)		EST (Estonia)		ITA (Italy)	ITA (Italy)		FRA (France)		GER (Germany)		Points

== Women ==
=== Calendar ===
Round	Event	Location	Dates
1	Germany	Rüdersdorf	12–14 October

=== Entry list ===
Team	Constructor	No	Rider
	Sherco	504	(United Kingdom) Nieve Holmes
Honda Redmoto World Enduro	Honda	514	(France) Livia Lancelot
	Husqvarna	532	(Spain) Mireia Badia
RFME Women Team	Husqvarna	552	(Spain) Humi Palau
RFME Women Team	Husqvarna	555	(Spain) Alba Vilaplana
	Yamaha	554	(Japan) Seiko Sugawara
	Beta	566	(Japan) Mami Masuda
	KTM	583	(Finland) Sanna Karkkainen
	Husqvarna	596	(United Kingdom) Jane Daniels

=== Riders Championship ===
Pos	Rider	Bike	GER (Germany)		Points
1	(Finland) Karkkainen	KTM	1	1	40
2	(France) Lancelot	Honda	2	2	36
3	(Spain) Badia	Husqvarna	3	3	32
4	(United Kingdom) Holmes	Sherco	4	4	28
5	(Spain) Vilaplana	Husqvarna	Ret	5	12
6	(Spain) Palau	Husqvarna	5	Ret	12
	(Japan) Masuda	Beta	Ret	Ret	0
	(United Kingdom) Daniels	Husqvarna	Ret	DNS	0
	(Japan) Sugawara	Yamaha	Ret	DNS	0
Pos	Rider	Bike	GER (Germany)		Points
