= 2018 FIM Women's Motocross World Championship =

Motocross championship season

The 2018 FIM Women's Motocross World Championship was the 14th Women's Motocross World Championship season. Kiara Fontanesi successfully defended her title, after taking her fifth title in 2017. Yamaha was the defending Manufacturing champion.

== 2018 Calendar ==
A 6-round calendar for the 2018 season was announced on 25 October 2017.

Round	Date	Grand Prix	Location	Race 1 Winner	Race 2 Winner	Round Winner	Report
1	April 8	Italy	Pietramurata	(Germany) Larissa Papenmeier	(New Zealand) Courtney Duncan	(Germany) Larissa Papenmeier	Report
2	April 15	Portugal	Agueda	(New Zealand) Courtney Duncan	(New Zealand) Courtney Duncan	(New Zealand) Courtney Duncan	Report
3	May 20	Germany	Teutschenthal	(New Zealand) Courtney Duncan	(New Zealand) Courtney Duncan	(New Zealand) Courtney Duncan	Report
4	June 17	Italy	Ottobiano	(Italy) Kiara Fontanesi	(Netherlands) Nancy van de Ven	(Netherlands) Nancy van de Ven	Report
5	September 16	Netherlands	Assen	(Italy) Kiara Fontanesi	(Italy) Kiara Fontanesi	(Italy) Kiara Fontanesi	Report
6	September 30	Italy	Imola	(Netherlands) Nancy van de Ven	(Italy) Kiara Fontanesi	(Italy) Kiara Fontanesi	Report

== Participants ==
Team	Constructor	No	Rider	Rounds
	Kawasaki	2	(Sweden) Sandra Karlsson	1
MXFontaRacing	Yamaha	8	(Italy) Kiara Fontanesi	All
Team Dragon Moto	KTM	9	(Switzerland) Virginie Germond	1–4, 6
	KTM	10	(Netherlands) Lara de Kruif	1, 5
Bloms MX Racing	Honda	11	(Sweden) Beatrice Galthe	1
Team VHR	KTM	14	(France) Mathilde Martinez	All
Orlen Team Duust KTM	KTM	19	(Poland) Joanna Miller	1
Chiemgau Racing Team	KTM	20	(Germany) Tanja Schlosser	3
Team Yvana Demaria 21	Kawasaki	21	(France) Yvana Demaria	
Baydale D3 Racing	KTM	25	(United Kingdom) Stacey Fisher	1–5
Absolut MX	Kawasaki	27	(Sweden) Ida Djärf Björklund	5
Disetti Moto	Yamaha	31	(Italy) Giorgia Montini	1, 4
	Honda	33	(Italy) Adele Innocenzi	6
KTM Diga Junior Racing	KTM	36	(United States) Avrie Berry	All
Team Kawasaki Zweirad Pfeil	Kawasaki	38	(Germany) Linda-Linsay Kramell	3
	KTM	42	(Belgium) Britt Van Muylem	5
Team Honda MX Sweden	Honda	44	(Republic of Ireland) Natalie Kane	1–5
	Honda	46	(Estonia) Kadri Ehamäe	6
Motoland Amiens	Yamaha	52	(France) Justine Charroux	All
Twenty Suspension Racing	Suzuki	55	(Germany) Kim Irmgartz	1–4
Twenty Suspension Racing	Suzuki	423	(Germany) Larissa Papenmeier	All
	Yamaha	62	(Norway) Madelen Hofseth Pedersen	3–4
Team Ecomaxx	KTM	71	(Netherlands) Demi Verploegh	1, 4–5
	Kawasaki	79	(Spain) Gabriela Seisdedos	3–6
	KTM	81	(Germany) Anna-Lena Weinmann	1
Lakerveld Racing	Yamaha	84	(Australia) Emma Milesevic	1–2
Lakerveld Racing	Yamaha	425	(Netherlands) Amber Simons	5–6
NoFear Yamaha	Yamaha	85	(Netherlands) Nancy van de Ven	All
	Honda	88	(France) Charlotte Deharbe	3
SK Racing	Kawasaki	90	(Switzerland) Sandra Keller	1, 4
	Honda	93	(Italy) Floriana Parrini	1, 6
Team AC 171	Yamaha	99	(France) Manon Haudoire	All
Team AC 171	Yamaha	203	(France) Camille Viaud	All
R2R Store KTM	KTM	100	(Netherlands) Eline Burgmans	1, 3–6
Čepelak Racing Team	Yamaha	101	(Czech Republic) Kristyna Vitkova	1
	Yamaha	106	(Germany) Julia Blatter	1
Mena Racing	Honda	108	(Spain) Miriam Mena	2
	KTM	110	(Germany) Steffi Laier	All
Stielergruppe.mx	Suzuki	111	(Germany) Anne Borchers	1–3
Francy Racing Suzuki Valenti	Suzuki	116	(Italy) Francesca Nocera	1, 4, 6
Cofain Racing Team	KTM	118	(Austria) Vanessa Umschaden	6
Cofain Racing Team	KTM	699	(Austria) Elena Kapsamer	1–4, 6
	KTM	121	(United Kingdom) Bethany Farmer	1
	Honda	131	(Denmark) Line Dam	All
I-Fly JK Racing Yamaha	Yamaha	138	(United Kingdom) Kathryn Booth	1–2, 5
I-Fly JK Racing Yamaha	Yamaha	172	(Netherlands) Lynn Valk	All
	Husqvarna	143	(Netherlands) Stephanie Stoutjesdijk	3–6
	Yamaha	146	(Germany) Lisa Michels	1, 3, 5–6
Altherm JCR Yamaha	Yamaha	151	(New Zealand) Courtney Duncan	1–4
Team MX Life DK	Yamaha	153	(Denmark) Barbara Aagaard	3–4
3MX Motorsport Team	KTM	174	(Italy) Giorgia Giudici	1
ORPS Motocross Team	Kawasaki	181	(Portugal) Tatiana Graça	2
	KTM	188	(Netherlands) Shana van der Vlist	All
	Kawasaki	193	(Netherlands) Kimberley Braam	1–5
	Yamaha	214	(France) Morgane Soulier	1, 3
PM34 Motos	Kawasaki	242	(Portugal) Filipa Leite	2
	Kawasaki	251	(France) Amandine Froment	4
Jomotos Honda	Honda	268	(Portugal) Ana Santos	2
Team Silver Action KTM	KTM	274	(Belgium) Amandine Verstappen	All
	Yamaha	290	(France) Mathilde Denis	All
Portugalenses Transportes Lda.	Husqvarna	303	(Portugal) Ana Alves	2
Flex-Box KTM	KTM	325	(Denmark) Sara Andersen	All
Motos UK Racing	KTM	346	(Spain) Sara Coloret	2
	Husqvarna	364	(Portugal) Joana Gonçalves	2
	KTM	381	(Netherlands) Ilse Hoenson	5
	Kawasaki	386	(Netherlands) Lianne Muilwijk	3–4
Garcia Motos	Suzuki	387	(Spain) Oihane Albizuri	6
	Honda	473	(Germany) Julia Degout	3
	Yamaha	555	(Sweden) Emelie Dahl	1–2
	Yamaha	612	(Norway) Mathea Selebø	1–2, 5
	Husqvarna	613	(Italy) Alice Magnoli	1, 4
Fly Over Racing	KTM	711	(Italy) Claudia Paradisi	6
	KTM	777	(Russia) Ekaterina Guryeva	3
Nine Six Four	Yamaha	964	(Netherlands) Nicky van Wordragen	1
	Suzuki	969	(Germany) Fiona Hoppe	1, 3–6
	Suzuki	974	(Germany) Janina Lehmann	All
	Suzuki	987	(Italy) Erica Lago	1, 4, 6
	Honda	997	(Italy) Andrea Grazia	6

Points are awarded to finishers of the main races, in the following format:

Position	1st	2nd	3rd	4th	5th	6th	7th	8th	9th	10th	11th	12th	13th	14th	15th	16th	17th	18th	19th	20th
Points	25	22	20	18	16	15	14	13	12	11	10	9	8	7	6	5	4	3	2	1

=== Riders Championship ===
Pos	Rider	Bike	TRE (Italy)		POR (Portugal)		GER (Germany)		ITA (Italy)		NED (Netherlands)		ITA (Italy)		Points
1	(Italy) Fontanesi	Yamaha	4	2	7	3	2	2	1	3	1	1	2	1	260
2	(Netherlands) Van De Ven	Yamaha	2	4	2	4	3	4	3	1	3	2	1	2	252
3	(Germany) Papenmeier	Suzuki	1	3	3	2	4	3	4	4	6	6	3	3	231
4	(New Zealand) Duncan	Yamaha	6	1	1	1	1	1	2	2					184
5	(Germany) Laier	KTM	5	8	6	7	5	7	8	10	2	4	5	6	183
6	(Belgium) Verstappen	KTM	3	5	4	8	23	10	7	5	4	3	4	5	180
7	(Netherlands) van der Vlist	KTM	20	13	11	5	9	6	5	6	8	5	7	7	150
8	(Republic of Ireland) Kane	Honda	8	7	5	11	6	8	6	8	5	14			132
9	(Denmark) Andersen	KTM	14	6	9	19	7	5	12	30	Ret	10	6	4	119
10	(Denmark) Dam	Honda	10	19	17	24	11	12	9	7	7	7	Ret	9	102
11	(Netherlands) Valk	Yamaha	26	17	12	15	16	13	10	9	10	8	10	16	95
12	(United States) Berry	KTM	24	24	20	16	13	16	11	12	9	9	13	13	78
13	(France) Charroux	Yamaha	12	18	14	18	10	11	24	16	13	19	11	11	78
14	(Switzerland) Germond	KTM	11	9	10	9	25	23	14	19			14	8	74
15	(Germany) Borchers	Suzuki	16	10	8	6	8	9							69
16	(France) Denis	Yamaha	17	27	15	Ret	12	18	21	14	11	18	9	10	65
17	(Italy) Nocera	Suzuki	9	11					13	11			8	15	59
18	(France) Martinez	KTM	21	16	16	12	14	17	26	21	DSQ	12	12	12	57
19	(Netherlands) Braam	Kawasaki	23	20	19	10	15	15	16	17	Ret	15			41
20	(Netherlands) Burgmans	KTM	22	25			17	22	15	13	12	11	22	21	37
21	(Norway) Selebø	Yamaha	19	14	22	14					17	13			28
22	(Germany) Lehmann	Suzuki	38	31	21	27	19	14	19	27	20	20	15	14	26
23	(Sweden) Dahl	Yamaha	7	12	24	23									23
24	(Australia) Milesevic	Yamaha	13	Ret	13	Ret									16
25	(Italy) Parrini	Honda	25	15									16	18	14
26	(Germany) Irmgartz	Suzuki	15	22	18	20	26	19	22	22					12
27	(Spain) Seisdedos	Kawasaki					28	Ret	18	20	Ret	Ret	17	17	12
28	(United Kingdom) Fisher	KTM	27	23	25	17	21	20	17	24	19	22			11
29	(Netherlands) Verploegh	KTM	28	38					Ret	29	15	17			10
30	(Netherlands) Stoutjesdijk	Husqvarna					32	27	28	26	16	25	18	19	10
31	(Italy) Montini	Yamaha	18	21					23	15					9
32	(Portugal) Gonçalves	Husqvarna			23	13									8
33	(United Kingdom) Booth	Yamaha	DNQ	DNQ	30	Ret					14	24			7
34	(Netherlands) Muilwijk	Kawasaki					18	21	25	18					6
35	(Netherlands) Simons	Yamaha									Ret	16	26	23	5
36	(Austria) Kapsamer	KTM	29	29	26	21	30	24	20	23			19	20	4
37	(Netherlands) de Kruif	KTM	33	30							18	Ret			3
38	(France) Viaud	Yamaha	DNQ	DNQ	29	25	29	30	36	34	24	27	20	26	1
39	(Norway) Hofseth Pedersen	Yamaha					20	26	30	33					1
	(Germany) Michels	Yamaha	30	26			22	Ret			22	21	28	Ret	0
	(Germany) Hoppe	Suzuki	DNQ	32			24	25	29	28	21	29	23	22	0
	(France) Haudoire	Yamaha	37	33	28	22	35	29	33	32	25	28	21	27	0
	(Belgium) Van Muylem	KTM									23	26			0
	(Sweden) Djärf Björklund	Kawasaki									Ret	23			0
	(Italy) Lago	Suzuki	DNQ	DNQ					35	37			24	24	0
	(Austria) Umschaden	KTM											25	25	0
	(Denmark) Aagaard	Yamaha					31	28	27	25					0
	(Spain) Mena	Honda			32	26									0
	(Estonia) Ehamäe	Honda											27	29	0
	(Russia) Guryeva	KTM					27	32							0
	(Spain) Coloret	KTM			27	Ret									0
	(Spain) Albizuri	Suzuki											29	28	0
	(Italy) Giudici	KTM	31	28											0
	(Italy) Paradisi	KTM											30	30	0
	(Netherlands) Hoenson	KTM									Ret	30			0
	(Switzerland) Keller	Kawasaki	34	36					31	31					0
	(Italy) Innocenzi	Honda											31	31	0
	(France) Soulier	Yamaha	DNQ	35			37	31							0
	(Portugal) Santos	Honda			31	Ret									0
	(Italy) Magnoli	Husqvarna	32	34					32	36					0
	(Italy) Grazia	Honda											32	32	0
	(France) Deharbe	Honda					36	33							0
	(Portugal) Leite	Kawasaki			33	Ret									0
	(Germany) Kramell	Kawasaki					33	Ret							0
	(France) Froment	Kawasaki							34	35					0
	(Germany) Degout	Honda					38	34							0
	(Portugal) Alves	Husqvarna			34	Ret									0
	(Germany) Schlosser	KTM					34	Ret							0
	(Poland) Miller	KTM	35	Ret											0
	(Czech Republic) Vitkova	Yamaha	36	37											0
	(Sweden) Karlsson	Kawasaki	Ret	DNS											0
	(Netherlands) van Wordragen	Yamaha	Ret	DNS											0
	(Portugal) Graça	Kawasaki			DNS	DNS									0
	(Germany) Blatter	Yamaha	DNQ	DNQ											0
	(Sweden) Galthe	Honda	DNQ	DNQ											0
	(United Kingdom) Farmer	KTM	DNQ	DNQ											0
	(Germany) Weinmann	KTM	DNQ	DNQ											0
Pos	Rider	Bike	TRE (Italy)		POR (Portugal)		GER (Germany)		ITA (Italy)		NED (Netherlands)		ITA (Italy)		Points

=== Manufacturers Championship ===
Pos	Bike	TRE (Italy)		POR (Portugal)		GER (Germany)		ITA (Italy)		NED (Netherlands)		ITA (Italy)		Points
1	Yamaha	2	1	1	1	1	1	1	1	1	1	1	1	297
2	Suzuki	1	3	3	2	4	3	4	4	6	6	3	3	231
3	KTM	3	5	4	5	5	5	5	5	2	3	4	4	212
4	Honda	8	7	5	11	6	8	6	7	5	7	27	9	152
5	Kawasaki	23	20	19	10	15	15	16	17	Ret	15	17	17	49
6	Husqvarna	32	34	23	13	32	27	28	26	16	25	18	19	18
Pos	Bike	TRE (Italy)		POR (Portugal)		GER (Germany)		ITA (Italy)		NED (Netherlands)		ITA (Italy)		Points
