= 2012 FIM Women's Motocross World Championship =

Motocross championship season

Seasons
- ← 2011 2013 →

The 2012 FIM Women's Motocross World Championship season was the eighth in the history of the championship. Kiara Fontanesi won her first riders' title, despite missing the final round, as Yamaha took their first Constructors' championship.

== 2012 Calendar ==
Round	Date	Grand Prix	Location	Race 1 Winner	Race 2 Winner
1	April 9	Netherlands	Valkenswaard	(Italy) Kiara Fontanesi	(Italy) Kiara Fontanesi
2	April 15	France	Castelnau-de-Lévis	(France) Livia Lancelot	(France) Livia Lancelot
3	May 20	Italy	Arco, Trentino	(Italy) Kiara Fontanesi	(Italy) Kiara Fontanesi
4	June 3	Croatia	Mladina	(Italy) Kiara Fontanesi	(Italy) Kiara Fontanesi
5	June 10	Slovenia	Orehova Vas	(Republic of Ireland) Natalie Kane	(Italy) Kiara Fontanesi
6	July 1	Slovakia	Senkvice	(Italy) Kiara Fontanesi	(Italy) Kiara Fontanesi
7	August 19	United Kingdom	Winchester	(Italy) Kiara Fontanesi	(France) Livia Lancelot
8	September 23	Germany	Teutschenthal	(France) Livia Lancelot	(France) Livia Lancelot

== Riders' standings ==
Points are awarded to the top 20 classified finishers.

Position	1st	2nd	3rd	4th	5th	6th	7th	8th	9th	10th	11th	12th	13th	14th	15th	16th	17th	18th	19th	20th
Points	25	22	20	18	16	15	14	13	12	11	10	9	8	7	6	5	4	3	2	1

(key)

Pos	Rider	Bike	NED (Netherlands)		FRA (France)		ITA (Italy)		CRO (Croatia)		SLO (Slovenia)		SVK (Slovakia)		GBR (United Kingdom)		GER (Germany)		Pts
1	(Italy) Kiara Fontanesi	Yamaha	1	1	2	2	1	1	1	1	2	1	1	1	1	3			336
2	(Republic of Ireland) Natalie Kane	KTM	4	8	4	4	3	23	2	2	1	2	2	2	3	2	4	3	302
3	(Netherlands) Britt van der Wekken	Honda	6	6	5	3	5	5	3	5	3	4	7	7	5	5	6	6	262
4	(France) Justine Charroux	Yamaha	17	14	3	6	8	4	5	3	5	6	6	6	6	8	8	8	228
5	(Germany) Anne Borchers	Suzuki	13	10	6	11	9	7	4	8	18	3	4	4	4	4	5	5	228
6	(Netherlands) Marianne Veenstra	KTM	9	5	7	5	4	6	9	9	6	8	8	8			9	7	195
7	(France) Livia Lancelot	Kawasaki	3	2	1	1									2	1	1	1	189
8	(Italy) Francesca Nocera	KTM	15	11	10	13	2	2	6	6	15	5	3	3	Ret	6			186
9	(Switzerland) Virginie Germond	Suzuki	25	28	8	7	18	8	7	11	4	13	5	5	7	7	DNS	10	164
10	(Netherlands) Nina Klink	KTM	8	9	13	8	6	Ret	10	7					14	11	11	12	122
11	(Poland) Joanna Miller	KTM	Ret	17	11	9	7	3	8	4	7	7							119
12	(Germany) Selina Schittenhelm	KTM	29	24	19	17	13	13	13	13	10	11	9	10	10	14	12	13	117
13	(Netherlands) Kimberley Braam	Kawasaki	14	15	17	15	14	11	15	12	8	9	10	9					103
14	(Italy) Floriana Parrini	Fantic	37	27	14	12	12	17	11	10	11	10	14	Ret					78
15	(Norway) Marie S. Pettersen	Yamaha	16	13	16	14									16	9	7	9	68
16	(United Kingdom) Alix Dunlop	Honda	12	20	21	19	17	9	18	16	13	14	17	16	19	16	24	23	67
17	(Belgium) Morane de Barquin	Honda	26	30			15	15	12	14	12	15	12	13			17	21	64
18	(United Kingdom) Sophia Paull	Honda			25	Ret	11	10							12	12	10	16	55
19	(Germany) Larissa Papenmeier	Suzuki															3	2	42
20	(Germany) Stephanie Laier	Kawasaki	2	3															42
21	(Netherlands) Stephanie Stoutjesdijk	KTM	23	18	30	24	19	16	20	19	17	16	18	20	20	18	14	17	41
22	(Australia) Meghan Rutledge	Kawasaki															2	4	40
23	(Sweden) Sara Pettersson	KTM	5	4															34
24	(Czech Republic) Barbora Laňková	Kawasaki							14	15			13	12			19	22	32
25	(Germany) Kim Irmgartz	KTM	11	12											9	24			31
26	(Russia) Ekaterina Guryeva	Kawasaki	24	25	24	22	16	12	16	17	16	18							31
27	(Sweden) Frida Östlund	Honda	7	7															28
28	(Finland) Sanna Kärkäinen	KTM							17	18	9	12							28
29	(United Kingdom) Billie Dunlop	Honda	22	23	15	25	27	Ret					20	22	21	15	13	15	27
30	(France) Mégane Pernet	Yamaha			9	10													23
31	(Venezuela) María Lorca	Suzuki	32	26	18	16	10	18											22
32	(Czech Republic) Jana Antošová	KTM									19	DNS	11	11					22
33	(Sweden) Sandra Adriansson	Kawasaki	10	33													DNS	11	21
34	(United Kingdom) Stacey Fisher	KTM													13	10			19
35	(Czech Republic) Marika Mlýnková	Kawasaki							21	20	21	17	15	15			21	Ret	17
36	(Spain) Gabriela Seisdedos	Kawasaki	19	29	Ret	DNS									8	Ret			15
37	(France) Jessie Joineau	Yamaha	20	16	12	DNS													15
38	(United Kingdom) Chelsea Gowland	Honda													15	13			14
39	(Latvia) Samanta Josta	TM	28	32									21	18	22	17	15	24	13
40	(United Kingdom) Amie Goodlad	Honda	21	19											11	21			12
41	(Czech Republic) Kristýna Fürbacherová	Kawasaki	36	31					19	Ret	DNS	19	Ret	14					11
42	(United Kingdom) Danni Marsh	Honda	30	34	27	28	26	19	22	21	14	20	26	25	23	23	27	27	10
43	(Italy) Gloria Decarli	Honda					22	14											7
44	(Austria) Selina Geyerhofer	KTM															29	14	7
46	(Czech Republic) Lucie Šimonová	KTM															16	20	6
47	(Czech Republic) Tereza Hromková	KTM											19	17			28	28	6
48	(United Kingdom) Kayleigh Durston	Honda													17	20			5
49	(Norway) Genette Våge	KTM															18	19	5
50	(United Kingdom) Gabrielle Hamlet	Suzuki													18	19			5
51	(Germany) Alicia Reitze	Yamaha															20	18	4
52	(Netherlands) Kelly van Oosanen	Yamaha	18	22															3
53	(France) Mélanie Perrez	Suzuki			23	18													3
54	(France) Lucie Jussiaume	Kawasaki			20	20													2
55	(Germany) Vanessa Danz	KTM	31	Ret			23	20					22	Ret			23	26	1
56	(Italy) Erica Lago	Suzuki	35	37	Ret	DNS	28	26			20	Ret	25	24			26	30	1
57	(Spain) Carla Magallón	Honda			26	27	20	25											1
	(France) Adeline Corbel	Yamaha	34	Ret	22	21													0
	(Italy) Alice Giorda	Yamaha					21	22											0
	(Czech Republic) Alena Dalecká	KTM											23	21					0
	(Italy) Michela Farci	KTM					25	21											0
	(Denmark) Catja Rasmussen	Suzuki	27	21															0
	(Finland) Jutta Lukkari	KTM	38	35	33	30									24	22			0
	(Belgium) Laura Dubois	Honda															22	25	0
	(Hungary) Alexandra Molnár	Yamaha											24	23					0
	(France) Alexandra Adgie	Yamaha			31	23													0
	(Germany) Antonie Jubert	Honda															25	29	0
	(Slovakia) Miriama Zavacká	Honda											27	26					0
	(Italy) Adele Innocenzi	Honda					29	27											0
	(Italy) Sara Giovannini	Honda					30	28											0
	(Spain) Ana Cristina Martín	KTM			28	31													0
	(France) Mégan Cano	Yamaha			32	29													0
	(France) Anouk Boudou	Yamaha															30	DNS	0
	(Finland) Ria Virtanen	KTM	33	36															0
	(Croatia) Snežana Debelić	KTM	39	38															0
