= 2017 FIM Women's Motocross World Championship =

Motocross championship season

The 2017 FIM Women's Motocross World Championship was the 13th Women's Motocross World Championship season. Livia Lancelot was the defending champion, after taking her second title in 2016. Kiara Fontanesi won her fifth title this season. Kawasaki was the defending Manufacturing champion.

== 2017 Calendar ==
A 6-round calendar for the 2017 season was announced on 15 October 2016.

Round	Date	Grand Prix	Location	Race 1 Winner	Race 2 Winner	Round Winner	Report
1	March 5	Indonesia	Pangkal Pinang	(Netherlands) Nancy van de Ven	(New Zealand) Courtney Duncan	(New Zealand) Courtney Duncan	Report
2	April 16	Italy	Pietramurata	(Italy) Kiara Fontanesi	(France) Livia Lancelot	(Italy) Kiara Fontanesi	Report
3	May 28	France	Ernee	(France) Livia Lancelot	(New Zealand) Courtney Duncan	(France) Livia Lancelot	Report
4	July 23	Czech Republic	Loket	(New Zealand) Courtney Duncan	(Belgium) Amandine Verstappen	(New Zealand) Courtney Duncan	Report
5	September 10	Netherlands	Assen	(Netherlands) Nancy van de Ven	(Netherlands) Nancy van de Ven	(Netherlands) Nancy van de Ven	Report
6	September 17	France	Villars-sous-Ecot	(Italy) Kiara Fontanesi	(New Zealand) Courtney Duncan	(Italy) Kiara Fontanesi	Report

== Participants ==
Team	Constructor	No	Rider	Rounds
Kawasaki Sweden Team Green	Kawasaki	2	(Sweden) Sandra Karlsson	4
Kawasaki Sweden Team Green	Kawasaki	27	(Sweden) Ida Djarf Bjorklund	5
Team JE68 KTM	KTM	7	(Sweden) Amanda Bergkvist	3, 5
Fonta MX Team Yamaha	Yamaha	8	(Italy) Kiara Fontanesi	All
Team Dragon Moto	Yamaha	9	(Switzerland) Virginie Germond	All
Team Dragon Moto	Yamaha	290	(France) Mathilde Denis	4–6
Cepelak Racing Team	Yamaha	10	(Czech Republic) Kristyna Vitkova	2, 4
	Suzuki	11	(Italy) Melissa Daliana	2
	KTM	12	(Netherlands) Lara de Kruif	5
MAC Racing	Husqvarna	14	(France) Mathilde Martinez	2–3, 6
iFly JK Racing Yamaha	Yamaha	18	(Australia) Madison Brown	All
iFly JK Racing Yamaha	Yamaha	138	(United Kingdom) Kathryn Booth	5–6
	Yamaha	17	(Australia) Courtney Whyte-Dennis	5–6
Duust KTM	KTM	19	(Poland) Joanna Miller	1–3
	KTM	20	(Germany) Tanja Schlosser	6
	KTM	25	(United Kingdom) Stacey Fisher	4–6
	Kawasaki	26	(Germany) Carmen Allinger	2, 6
	Yamaha	31	(Italy) Giorgia Montini	2
	Husqvarna	32	(United Kingdom) Elaine MacEachern	1, 3, 5–6
Diga KTM Junior Team	KTM	36	(United States) Avrie Berry	5–6
	Yamaha	40	(Germany) Alicia Reitze	4
Team Honda MX Sweden	Honda	44	(Republic of Ireland) Natalie Kane	2, 4
	Husqvarna	45	(Indonesia) Novita Anjani	1
	Husqvarna	52	(France) Justine Charroux	All
Twenty Suspension Suzuki	Suzuki	55	(Germany) Kim Irmgartz	2–5
Twenty Suspension Suzuki	Suzuki	423	(Germany) Larissa Papenmeier	All
	Suzuki	67	(Netherlands) Britt van der Werff	All
Van Der Laar Racing	Yamaha	84	(Australia) Emma Milesevic	2–6
VENS Motorsport	Yamaha	85	(Netherlands) Nancy van de Ven	All
	Kawasaki	90	(Switzerland) Sandra Keller	4
Mefo Sport Racing Team	KTM	98	(Germany) Selina Schittenhelm	2
Team AC171	Yamaha	99	(France) Manon Haudoire	3, 6
	KTM	100	(Netherlands) Eline Burgmans	5
KTM Racing Center Antwerpen	KTM	110	(Germany) Steffi Laier	2–3, 5
Stielergruppe.mx Suzuki	Suzuki	111	(Germany) Anne Borchers	1, 3–6
	Kawasaki	112	(Germany) Michaela Keil	4
Team 114 Kawasaki	Kawasaki	114	(France) Livia Lancelot	All
Fuzion Racing Team	Suzuki	116	(Italy) Francesca Nocera	All
Schruf Racing	Yamaha	127	(Austria) Julia Schrenk	4
	Honda	128	(Italy) Giada Calgaro	2
Team JS Racing	Honda	130	(France) Jessie Joineau	3, 6
	Honda	131	(Denmark) Line Dam	5–6
Schweyen MX	Yamaha	137	(France) Lisa Guerber	2–6
Phoenix Tools Honda	Honda	138	(United Kingdom) Kathryn Booth	3
	Husqvarna	141	(Italy) Sabrina Gorni	2
	Husqvarna	143	(Netherlands) Stephanie Stoutjesdijk	2–4
	Husqvarna	150	(France) Julie Peyssard	3
Altherm JCR Yamaha	Yamaha	151	(New Zealand) Courtney Duncan	All
	Yamaha	153	(Denmark) Barbara Aagaard	3
	KTM	172	(Indonesia) Suci Mulyani	1
	Yamaha	178	(United Kingdom) Amie Goodlad	3
Sarholz KTM Racing	KTM	185	(Germany) Vanessa Danz	2–3
CreyMert Racing Team	KTM	188	(Netherlands) Shana van der Vlist	1–4
	Kawasaki	193	(Netherlands) Kimberley Braam	2–6
Mellendijk Motor Parts	Husqvarna	207	(Netherlands) Manon Ligtlee	5
	Yamaha	214	(France) Morgane Soulier	6
Team Handel MX Gibson Tyre Tech	KTM	237	(Germany) Celine Abel	2
	KTM	238	(Poland) Wiktoria Garbowska	4
	Kawasaki	251	(France) Amandine Froment	2–3
Silver Action KTM	KTM	274	(Belgium) Amandine Verstappen	All
	Honda	285	(France) Agathe Mazoue	3
MC KAJ	Yamaha	325	(Denmark) Sara Andersen	2–6
	KTM	381	(Netherlands) Ilse Hoenson	5
Team Muilwijk 386	Honda	386	(Netherlands) Lianne Muilwijk	5
Team Yamaha Scandinavia	Yamaha	555	(Sweden) Emelie Dahl	2–6
	Yamaha	612	(Norway) Mathea Selebo	2–6
	Husqvarna	613	(Italy) Alice Magnoli	2
Cofain Racing Team	KTM	699	(Austria) Elena Kapsamer	3–4
	KTM	777	(Russia) Ekaterina Guryeva	2
Scandinavian Racing Sports	KTM	811	(Norway) Genette Vaage	1–3
	KTM	921	(Indonesia) Monica Defeter	1
Team Nine Six Four	Yamaha	964	(Netherlands) Nicky van Wordragen	1–5
	Honda	966	(Italy) Radha Quas	2
	KTM	969	(Germany) Fiona Hoppe	2–4
Kokane Power Bike Racing Team	Suzuki	974	(Germany) Janina Lehmann	2–6
	Suzuki	987	(Italy) Erica Lago	2
	Yamaha	991	(Russia) Liubov Leonteva	2

Points are awarded to finishers of the main races, in the following format:

Position	1st	2nd	3rd	4th	5th	6th	7th	8th	9th	10th	11th	12th	13th	14th	15th	16th	17th	18th	19th	20th
Points	25	22	20	18	16	15	14	13	12	11	10	9	8	7	6	5	4	3	2	1

== Riders Championship ==
Pos	Rider	Bike	INS (Indonesia)		TRE (Italy)		FRA (France)		CZE (Czech Republic)		NED (Netherlands)		FRA (France)		Points
1	(Italy) Fontanesi	Yamaha	13	2	1	2	4	3	2	6	5	3	1	3	233
2	(France) Lancelot	Kawasaki	15	3	5	1	1	2	4	5	3	2	3	2	232
3	(New Zealand) Duncan	Yamaha	5	1	2	3	Ret	1	1	2	4	4	6	1	231
4	(Netherlands) van de Ven	Yamaha	1	DSQ	3	4	2	4	3	3	1	1	2	5	231
5	(Germany) Papenmeier	Suzuki	6	6	4	6	3	5	5	14	2	5	5	4	194
6	(Belgium) Verstappen	KTM	8	7	6	7	10	7	6	1	6	6	4	6	184
7	(Netherlands) van Wordragen	Yamaha	2	4	9	14	6	8	7	4	Ret	DNS			119
8	(Italy) Nocera	Suzuki	11	9	18	5	7	15	11	15	18	24	18	9	95
9	(Switzerland) Germond	Yamaha	10	13	13	8	16	12	16	10	Ret	DNS	10	8	94
10	(Netherlands) van der Vlist	KTM	4	8	10	13	18	11	9	7					89
11	(Germany) Borchers	Suzuki	3	10			24	23	18	13	7	13	16	10	80
12	(Sweden) Dahl	Yamaha			11	32	11	14	10	8	Ret	7	15	14	78
13	(Australia) Brown	Yamaha	14	15	20	31	12	16	12	11	14	10	8	Ret	78
14	(Denmark) Andersen	Yamaha			27	9	8	6	8	17	24	9	13	Ret	77
15	(France) Charroux	Yamaha	12	14	24	15	9	13	20	16	20	15	9	12	76
16	(Germany) Laier	KTM			8	11	5	9			9	12			72
17	(Netherlands) van der Werff	Suzuki	16	11	15	Ret	13	Ret	Ret	DNS	8	8	23	Ret	55
18	(Norway) Selebo	Yamaha			17	18	20	17	13	24	13	14	11	15	51
19	(Poland) Miller	KTM	18	12	12	10	19	19							36
20	(Netherlands) Braam	Kawasaki			23	21	17	20	27	Ret	16	11	14	13	35
21	(Australia) Milesevic	Yamaha			14	35	DNS	DNS	14	12	21	16	21	16	33
22	(France) Joineau	Honda					14	10					7	Ret	32
23	(France) Martinez	Husqvarna			Ret	12	25	26					12	7	32
24	(Norway) Vaage	KTM	9	5	21	19	22	21							30
25	(United Kingdom) MacEachern	Husqvarna	7	17			27	18			Ret	29	Ret	Ret	21
26	(France) Denis	Yamaha							17	18	12	20	17	Ret	21
27	(Sweden) Karlsson	Kawasaki							15	9					18
28	(Germany) Irmgartz	Suzuki			19	17	15	25	Ret	21	23	18			15
29	(Republic of Ireland) Kane	Honda			7	Ret			DNS	DNS					14
30	(Netherlands) Muilwijk	Honda									11	17			14
31	(Netherlands) Burgmans	KTM									10	19			13
32	(United States) Berry	KTM									19	25	24	11	12
33	(Indonesia) Mulyani	Yamaha	17	16											9
34	(Sweden) Bergkvist	KTM					33	27			15	23			6
35	(Russia) Leonteva	Yamaha			Ret	16									5
36	(Italy) Montini	Yamaha			16	Ret									5
37	(United Kingdom) Fisher	KTM							24	26	22	21	22	17	4
38	(Netherlands) de Kruif	KTM									17	22			4
39	(France) Haudoire	Yamaha					29	31					25	18	3
40	(Czech Republic) Vitkova	Yamaha			34	22			19	20					3
41	(United Kingdom) Booth	Honda					21	24							2
41	(United Kingdom) Booth	Yamaha									Ret	Ret	19	Ret	2
42	(Germany) Reitze	Yamaha							21	19					2
43	(Germany) Schlosser	KTM											28	19	2
44	(Indonesia) Defeter	KTM	19	DNS											2
45	(Germany) Lehmann	Suzuki			22	26	23	22	22	22	Ret	26	Ret	20	1
46	(Germany) Allinger	Kawasaki			26	29							20	Ret	1
47	(Russia) Guryeva	KTM			30	20									1
48	(Indonesia) Anjani	Husqvarna	20	DNS											1
	(France) Guerber	Yamaha			33	24	26	28	23	25	26	31	29	Ret	0
	(Netherlands) Stoutjesdijk	Husqvarna			25	25	30	30	25	23					0
	(Italy) Quas	Honda			29	23									0
	(Netherlands) Hoenson	KTM									25	32			0
	(Austria) Kapsamer	KTM					28	29	26	28					0
	(Australia) Whyte-Dennis	Yamaha									Ret	30	26	Ret	0
	(Germany) Hoppe	KTM			Ret	30	34	33	29	27					0
	(Germany) Abel	KTM			35	27									0
	(Sweden) Djarf Bjorklund	Kawasaki									Ret	27			0
	(France) Soulier	Yamaha											27	Ret	0
	(Germany) Danz	KTM			32	28	32	34							0
	(Denmark) Dam	Honda									Ret	28	Ret	Ret	0
	(Italy) Daliana	Suzuki			28	Ret									0
	(Switzerland) Keller	Kawasaki							28	Ret					0
	(Poland) Garbowska	KTM							30	29					0
	(Germany) Keil	Kawasaki							32	30					0
	(Austria) Schrenk	Yamaha							31	31					0
	(United Kingdom) Goodlad	Yamaha					31	32							0
	(Germany) Schittenhelm	KTM			31	33									0
	(Italy) Magnoli	Husqvarna			Ret	34									0
	(France) Froment	Kawasaki			DNQ	DNQ	35	35							0
	(Italy) Calgaro	Honda			36	36									0
	(Denmark) Aagaard	Yamaha					36	36							0
	(France) Mazoue	Honda					38	37							0
	(France) Peyssard	Husqvarna					37	38							0
	(Netherlands) Ligtlee	Husqvarna									Ret	Ret			0
	(Italy) Gorni	Husqvarna			DNQ	DNQ									0
	(Italy) Lago	Suzuki			DNQ	DNQ									0
Pos	Rider	Bike	INS (Indonesia)		TRE (Italy)		FRA (France)		CZE (Czech Republic)		NED (Netherlands)		FRA (France)		Points

Colour	Result
Gold	Winner
Silver	Second place
Bronze	Third place
Green	Points classification
Blue	Non-points classification
Blue	Non-classified finish (NC)
Purple	Retired, not classified (Ret)
Red	Did not qualify (DNQ)
Red	Did not pre-qualify (DNPQ)
Black	Disqualified (DSQ)
White	Did not start (DNS)
White	Withdrew (WD)
White	Race cancelled (C)
Blank	Did not practice (DNP)
Blank	Did not arrive (DNA)
Blank	Excluded (EX)

== Manufacturers Championship ==
Pos	Bike	INS (Indonesia)		TRE (Italy)		FRA (France)		CZE (Czech Republic)		NED (Netherlands)		FRA (France)		Points
1	Yamaha	1	1	1	2	2	1	1	2	1	1	1	1	291
2	Kawasaki	15	3	5	1	1	2	4	5	3	2	3	2	232
3	Suzuki	3	6	4	5	3	5	5	13	2	5	5	4	201
4	KTM	4	5	6	7	5	7	6	1	6	6	4	6	196
5	Honda			7	23	14	10	DNS	DNS	11	17	7	Ret	60
6	Husqvarna	7	17	25	12	25	26	25	23	Ret	Ret	12	7	50
Pos	Bike	INS (Indonesia)		TRE (Italy)		FRA (France)		CZE (Czech Republic)		NED (Netherlands)		FRA (France)		Points

Colour	Result
Gold	Winner
Silver	Second place
Bronze	Third place
Green	Points classification
Blue	Non-points classification
Blue	Non-classified finish (NC)
Purple	Retired, not classified (Ret)
Red	Did not qualify (DNQ)
Red	Did not pre-qualify (DNPQ)
Black	Disqualified (DSQ)
White	Did not start (DNS)
White	Withdrew (WD)
White	Race cancelled (C)
Blank	Did not practice (DNP)
Blank	Did not arrive (DNA)
Blank	Excluded (EX)
