= 2016 MXGP of Qatar =

The 2016 MXGP of Qatar was the first round of the 2016 FIM Motocross World Championship season. It was held at the Losail International Circuit in Lusail, Qatar on 26-27 February 2016 and included the first rounds of the 2016 MXGP and MX2 world championships, along with the first round of the 2016 FIM Women's Motocross World Championship. Romain Febvre was the reigning MXGP world champion, after taking his first title in 2015.

== Entry Lists ==
The entry lists for the 2016 MXGP of Qatar were announced on 12 January 2016.

=== Entry list ===
MXGP Entry List

No.	Rider	Team	Manufacturer
7	(Estonia) Tanel Leok		KTM
8	(New Zealand) Ben Townley	Team Suzuki World MXGP	Suzuki
9	(Belgium) Ken De Dycker^{1}	24MX Honda	Honda
12	(Germany) Max Nagl	Rockstar Energy Husqvarna	Husqvarna
17	(Spain) Jose Butron	Marchetti Racing KTM	KTM
21	(France) Gautier Paulin	Team HRC	Honda
22	(Belgium) Kevin Strijbos	Team Suzuki World MXGP	Suzuki
23	(France) Christophe Charlier	Rockstar Energy Husqvarna	Husqvarna
24	(United Kingdom) Shaun Simpson	Wilvo Virus Performance KTM	KTM
25	(Belgium) Clement Desalle	Monster Energy Kawasaki	Kawasaki
31	(United Kingdom) Alex Snow	JK Racing Yamaha	Yamaha
32	(France) Milko Potisek	Tip Top MP32 Racing	Yamaha
77	(Italy) Alessandro Lupino	Team Assomotor Honda	Honda
89	(Belgium) Jeremy van Horebeek	Monster Energy Yamaha	Yamaha
92	(Switzerland) Valentin Guillod	Kemea Yamaha Yamalube	Yamaha
100	(United Kingdom) Tommy Searle	Monster Energy DRT Kawasaki	Kawasaki
191	(Latvia) Matiss Karro^{2}	24MX Honda	Honda
222	(Italy) Tony Cairoli	Red Bull KTM	KTM
243	(Slovenia) Tim Gajser	Honda Gariboldi	Honda
259	(Netherlands) Glenn Coldenhoff	Red Bull KTM	KTM
400	(Japan) Kei Yamamoto	Team Assomotor Honda	Honda
461	(France) Romain Febvre	Monster Energy Yamaha	Yamaha
777	(Russia) Evgeny Bobryshev	Team HRC	Honda
911	(France) Jordi Tixier^{3}	Monster Energy Kawasaki	Kawasaki
999	(Portugal) Rui Gonçalves^{4}	NewHolland 8biano Massignani Husqvarna	Husqvarna

^{1} Ken De Dycker did not ride due to a broken femur sustained in pre-season training.

^{2} Matiss Karro did not ride due to a torn left ACL sustained in a pre-season race.

^{3} Jordi Tixier did not ride due to an operation needed on his already injured wrist.

^{4} Rui Gonçalves did not ride due to a serious finger injury picked up at a pre-season race.

MX2 Entry List

No.	Rider	Team	Manufacturer
4	(France) Dylan Ferrandis	Monster Energy Kawasaki	Kawasaki
6	(France) Benoit Paturel	Kemea Yamaha Yamalube	Yamaha
10	(Netherlands) Calvin Vlaanderen	HSF Logistics Motorsport	KTM
14	(Switzerland) Christopher Valente	Marchetti Racing Team	KTM
18	(Russia) Vsevolod Brylyakov	Monster Energy DRT Kawasaki	Kawasaki
29	(Germany) Henry Jacobi	JTech Honda	Honda
33	(Belgium) Julien Lieber^{1}	Wilvo Standing Construct Yamaha	Yamaha
41	(Latvia) Pauls Jonass	Red Bull KTM	KTM
43	(Italy) Davide de Bortoli	NewHolland 8biano Massignani Husqvarna	Husqvarna
46	(Netherlands) Davy Pootjes	Red Bull KTM	KTM
59	(Russia) Aleksandr Tonkov	Wilvo Standing Construct Yamaha	Yamaha
64	(United States) Thomas Covington	Rockstar Energy Husqvarna	Husqvarna
71	(Belgium) Damon Graulus	JTech Honda	Honda
84	(Netherlands) Jeffrey Herlings	Red Bull KTM	KTM
88	(Netherlands) Frederik van der Vlist	Team HNR GPR PROMO	Kawasaki
91	(Switzerland) Jeremy Seewer	Team Suzuki World MX2	Suzuki
97	(Bulgaria) Michael Ivanov	Marchetti Racing Team	KTM
99	(United Kingdom) Max Anstie	Rockstar Energy Husqvarna	Husqvarna
101	(Spain) Jorge Zaragoza	Honda Gariboldi	Honda
128	(Italy) Ivo Monticelli	Marchetti Racing Team	KTM
152	(Bulgaria) Petar Petrov	Monster Energy Kawasaki	Kawasaki
161	(Sweden) Alvin Östlund^{2}	Wilvo Standing Construct Yamaha	Yamaha
172	(Belgium) Brent van Doninck	Kemea Yamaha Yamalube	Yamaha
174	(United Kingdom) Alfie Smith	JK Racing Yamaha	Yamaha
189	(Netherlands) Brian Bogers	HSF Logistics Motorsport	KTM
223	(Italy) Giuseppe Tropepe	NewHolland 8biano Massignani Husqvarna	Husqvarna
251	(Belgium) Jens Getteman	Motocross Marketing KTM	KTM
321	(Italy) Samuele Bernardini	TM Factory Racing Team	TM
811	(United Kingdom) Adam Sterry	Wilvo Virus Performance KTM	KTM
919	(United Kingdom) Ben Watson	Hitachi Construction KTM	KTM

^{1} Julien Lieber did not ride due to ongoing hip problems.

^{2} Alvin Östlund made his Grand Prix debut to replace Lieber.

WMX Entry List

No.	Rider	Team	Manufacturer
8	(Italy) Kiara Fontanesi	MX Fontaracing	Yamaha
9	(Switzerland) Virginie Germond		Suzuki
25	(United Kingdom) Stacey Fisher		KTM
32	(United Kingdom) Elaine MacEachern		KTM
44	(Republic of Ireland) Natalie Kane	BRT Racing Team	KTM
45	(Netherlands) Gwenda Haans		Husqvarna
52	(France) Justine Charroux		Yamaha
67	(Netherlands) Britt van der Werff		Suzuki
85	(Netherlands) Nancy van der Ven		Yamaha
111	(Germany) Anne Borchers		Suzuki
114	(France) Livia Lancelot	Team One One Four	Kawasaki
116	(Italy) Francesca Nocera		Suzuki
151	(New Zealand) Courtney Duncan		Yamaha
174	(Italy) Giorgia Giudici	NewHolland 8biano Massignani Husqvarna	Husqvarna
188	(Netherlands) Shana van der Vlist		Yamaha
193	(Netherlands) Kimberley Braam		Kawasaki
274	(Belgium) Amandine Verstappen	Motocross Marketing KTM	KTM
386	(Netherlands) Lianne Muilwijk		Honda
555	(Sweden) Emelie Dahl		Yamaha
811	(Norway) Genette Vaage	CEC Scandinavian Sports	KTM
991	(Russia) Liubov Leonteva		Yamaha

== MXGP ==
=== MXGP Practice Times ===
Free Practice

Position	No.	Driver	Constructor	Time	Time Gap
1	777	(Russia) Evgeny Bobryshev	Honda	1:42.284	
2	461	(France) Romain Febvre	Yamaha	1:42.625	+0.341
3	243	(Slovenia) Tim Gajser	Honda	1:42.633	+0.379
4	89	(Belgium) Jeremy van Horebeek	Yamaha	1:42.665	+0.381
5	259	(Netherlands) Glenn Coldenhoff	KTM	1:42.872	+0.588
6	222	(Italy) Tony Cairoli	KTM	1:43.054	+0.770
7	100	(United Kingdom) Tommy Searle	Kawasaki	1:43.226	+0.942
8	21	(France) Gautier Paulin	Honda	1:43.507	+1.223
9	24	(United Kingdom) Shaun Simpson	KTM	1:43.908	+1.624
10	17	(Spain) Jose Butron	KTM	1:44.044	+1.760
11	7	(Estonia) Tanel Leok	KTM	1:45.018	+2.734
12	8	(New Zealand) Ben Townley	Suzuki	1:45.061	+2.777
13	12	(Germany) Max Nagl	Husqvarna	1:45.366	+3.082
14	23	(France) Christophe Charlier	Husqvarna	1:45.544	+3.260
15	77	(Italy) Alessandro Lupino	Honda	1:45.870	+3.586
16	22	(Belgium) Kevin Strijbos	Suzuki	1:45.871	+3.587
17	92	(Switzerland) Valentin Guillod	Yamaha	1:46.344	+4.060
18	32	(France) Milko Potisek	Yamaha	1:47.259	+4.975
19	31	(United Kingdom) Alex Snow	Yamaha	1:49.002	+6.718
20	400	(Japan) Kei Yamamoto	Honda	1:53.604	+11.320
21	25	(Belgium) Clement Desalle^{1}	Kawasaki	2:05.312	+23.028

^{1} Clement Desalle is riding the grand prix with a broken arm that he sustained at a pre-season race.

MXGP Timed Practice

Position	No.	Driver	Constructor	Time	Time Gap
1	21	(France) Gautier Paulin	Honda	1:42.773	
2	777	(Russia) Evgeny Bobryshev	Honda	1:43.064	+0.291
3	259	(Netherlands) Glenn Coldenhoff	KTM	1:43.069	+0.296
4	243	(Slovenia) Tim Gajser	Honda	1:43.425	+0.625
5	461	(France) Romain Febvre	Yamaha	1:43.655	+0.882
6	89	(Belgium) Jeremy van Horebeek	Yamaha	1:43.779	+1.006
7	22	(Belgium) Kevin Strijbos	Suzuki	1:43.915	+1.142
8	100	(United Kingdom) Tommy Searle	Kawasaki	1:44.212	+1.439
9	24	(United Kingdom) Shaun Simpson	KTM	1:44.432	+1.659
10	92	(Switzerland) Valentin Guillod	Yamaha	1:44.648	+1.875
11	12	(Germany) Max Nagl	Husqvarna	1:44.742	+1.969
12	77	(Italy) Alessandro Lupino	Honda	1:45.258	+2.485
13	17	(Spain) Jose Butron	KTM	1:45.422	+2.649
14	8	(New Zealand) Ben Townley	Suzuki	1:45.547	+2.774
15	23	(France) Christophe Charlier	Husqvarna	1:45.584	+2.811
16	222	(Italy) Tony Cairoli	KTM	1:45.688	+2.915
17	7	(Estonia) Tanel Leok	KTM	1:46.699	+3.926
18	31	(United Kingdom) Alex Snow	Yamaha	1:47.838	+5.065
19	32	(France) Milko Potisek	Yamaha	1:48.554	+5.781
20	400	(Japan) Kei Yamamoto	Honda	1:49.384	+6.611

=== MXGP Qualifying Race ===
Position	No.	Driver	Constructor	Laps	Time Gap
1	777	(Russia) Evgeny Bobryshev	Honda	13	
2	243	(Slovenia) Tim Gajser	Honda	13	+1.814
3	461	(France) Romain Febvre	Yamaha	13	+6.734
4	222	(Italy) Tony Cairoli	KTM	13	+16.642
5	259	(Netherlands) Glenn Coldenhoff	KTM	13	+19.578
6	21	(France) Gautier Paulin	Honda	13	+24.719
7	12	(Germany) Max Nagl	Husqvarna	13	+26.985
8	24	(United Kingdom) Shaun Simpson	KTM	13	+28.083
9	100	(United Kingdom) Tommy Searle	Kawasaki	13	+29.186
10	22	(Belgium) Kevin Strijbos	Suzuki	13	+30.329
11	89	(Belgium) Jeremy van Horebeek	Yamaha	13	+39.504
12	92	(Switzerland) Valentin Guillod	Yamaha	13	+40.586
13	17	(Spain) Jose Butron	KTM	13	+43.419
14	77	(Italy) Alessandro Lupino	Honda	13	+59.196
15	7	(Estonia) Tanel Leok	KTM	13	+1:00.165
16	32	(France) Milko Potisek	Yamaha	13	+1:08.852
17	8	(New Zealand) Ben Townley	Suzuki	13	+1:25.015
18	23	(France) Christophe Charlier	Husqvarna	13	+1:31.096
19	31	(United Kingdom) Alex Snow	Yamaha	13	+1:34.825
20	400	(Japan) Kei Yamamoto	Honda	13	+1:55.131
	25	(Belgium) Clement Desalle	Kawasaki	2	

=== MXGP Races ===
Race 1

Position	No.	Driver	Constructor	Laps	Time Gap	Points
1	243	(Slovenia) Tim Gajser^{1}	Honda	18		25
2	777	(Russia) Evgeny Bobryshev	Honda	18	+7.507	22
3	461	(France) Romain Febvre	Yamaha	18	+19.644	20
4	89	(Belgium) Jeremy van Horebeek	Yamaha	18	+23.148	18
5	24	(United Kingdom) Shaun Simpson	KTM	18	+27.015	16
6	222	(Italy) Tony Cairoli	KTM	18	+29.383	15
7	259	(Netherlands) Glenn Coldenhoff	KTM	18	+30.886	14
8	22	(Belgium) Kevin Strijbos	Suzuki	18	+32.227	13
9	100	(United Kingdom) Tommy Searle	Kawasaki	18	+33.672	12
10	21	(France) Gautier Paulin	Honda	18	+35.336	11
11	8	(New Zealand) Ben Townley	Suzuki	18	+38.183	10
12	12	(Germany) Max Nagl	Husqvarna	18	+40.398	9
13	17	(Spain) Jose Butron	KTM	18	+58.882	8
14	92	(Switzerland) Valentin Guillod	Yamaha	18	+59.204	7
15	32	(France) Milko Potisek	Yamaha	18	+1:20.303	6
16	7	(Estonia) Tanel Leok	KTM	18	+1:22.623	5
17	23	(France) Christophe Charlier	Husqvarna	18	+1:42.385	4
18	77	(Italy) Alessandro Lupino	Honda	17	+1 Lap	3
19	400	(Japan) Kei Yamamoto	Honda	17	+1 Lap	2
	25	(Belgium) Clement Desalle	Kawasaki	13	Retired	1
	31	(United Kingdom) Alex Snow	Yamaha	5	Retired	

^{1} 2015 MX2 world champion Tim Gajser won his first MXGP class race on his MXGP debut.

Race 2

Position	No.	Driver	Constructor	Laps	Time Gap	Points
1	243	(Slovenia) Tim Gajser^{1}	Honda	18		25
2	461	(France) Romain Febvre	Yamaha	18	+8.230	22
3	777	(Russia) Evgeny Bobryshev	Honda	18	+9.952	20
4	222	(Italy) Tony Cairoli	KTM	18	+10.628	18
5	89	(Belgium) Jeremy van Horebeek	Yamaha	18	+11.960	16
6	12	(Germany) Max Nagl	Husqvarna	18	+14.601	15
7	24	(United Kingdom) Shaun Simpson	KTM	18	+19.057	14
8	100	(United Kingdom) Tommy Searle	Kawasaki	18	+20.221	13
9	22	(Belgium) Kevin Strijbos	Suzuki	18	+41.741	12
10	259	(Netherlands) Glenn Coldenhoff	KTM	18	+42.891	11
11	8	(New Zealand) Ben Townley	Suzuki	18	+1:06.509	10
12	92	(Switzerland) Valentin Guillod	Yamaha	18	+1:08.264	9
13	7	(Estonia) Tanel Leok	KTM	18	+1:09.098	8
14	32	(France) Milko Potisek	Yamaha	18	+1:14.161	7
15	17	(Spain) Jose Butron	KTM	18	+1:18.256	6
16	77	(Italy) Alessandro Lupino	Honda	17	+1:24.587	5
17	23	(France) Christophe Charlier	Husqvarna	18	+1:28.740	4
18	400	(Japan) Kei Yamamoto	Honda	17	+1 Lap	3
19	25	(Belgium) Clement Desalle	Kawasaki	17	+1 Lap	2
20	31	(United Kingdom) Alex Snow	Yamaha	17	+1 Lap	1
	21	(France) Gautier Paulin^{2}	Honda	0	Retired	

^{1} Tim Gajser took his first MXGP class double race win on his MXGP debut.

^{2} Gautier Paulin retired with a mechanical problem on the first lap.

=== MXGP of Qatar Overall ===
Position	No.	Driver	Constructor	Race 1	Race 2	Points
1	243	(Slovenia) Tim Gajser^{1}	Honda	25	25	50
2	461	(France) Romain Febvre	Yamaha	20	22	42
3	777	(Russia) Evgeny Bobryshev	Honda	22	20	42
4	89	(Belgium) Jeremy van Horebeek	Yamaha	18	16	34
5	222	(Italy) Tony Cairoli	KTM	15	18	33
6	24	(United Kingdom) Shaun Simpson	KTM	16	14	30
7	100	(United Kingdom) Tommy Searle	Kawasaki	12	13	25
8	22	(Belgium) Kevin Strijbos	Suzuki	13	12	25
9	259	(Netherlands) Glenn Coldenhoff	KTM	14	11	25
10	12	(Germany) Max Nagl	Husqvarna	9	15	24
11	8	(New Zealand) Ben Townley	Suzuki	10	10	20
12	92	(Switzerland) Valentin Guillod	Yamaha	7	9	16
13	17	(Spain) Jose Butron	KTM	8	6	14
14	7	(Estonia) Tanel Leok	KTM	5	8	13
15	32	(France) Milko Potisek	Yamaha	6	7	13
16	21	(France) Gautier Paulin	Honda	11	0	11
17	77	(Italy) Alessandro Lupino	Honda	3	5	8
18	23	(France) Christophe Charlier	Husqvarna	4	4	8
19	400	(Japan) Kei Yamamoto	Honda	2	3	5
20	25	(Belgium) Clement Desalle	Kawasaki	1	2	3
21	31	(United Kingdom) Alex Snow	Yamaha	0	1	1

^{1}Tim Gajser took his first MXGP class overall on his debut in the class.

== MX2 ==
=== MX2 Practice Times ===
Free Practice

Position	No.	Driver	Constructor	Time	Time Gap
1	172	(Belgium) Brent van Donninck	Yamaha	1:43.122	
2	84	(Netherlands) Jeffrey Herlings	KTM	1:43.532	+0.410
3	4	(France) Dylan Ferrandis	Kawasaki	1:43.554	+0.432
4	59	(Russia) Aleksandr Tonkov	Yamaha	1:43.958	+0.836
5	64	(United States) Thomas Covington	Husqvarna	1:44.314	+1.192
6	99	(United Kingdom) Max Anstie	Husqvarna	1:44.802	+1.680
7	41	(Latvia) Pauls Jonass	KTM	1:44.824	+1.702
8	46	(Netherlands) Davy Pootjes	KTM	1:44.982	+1.860
9	152	(Bulgaria) Petar Petrov	Kawasaki	1:45.035	+1.913
10	811	(United Kingdom) Adam Sterry	KTM	1:45.569	+2.447
11	18	(Russia) Vsevolod Brylyakov	Kawasaki	1:45.599	+2.477
12	91	(Switzerland) Jeremy Seewer	Suzuki	1:45.702	+2.580
13	6	(France) Benoit Paturel	Yamaha	1:45.766	+2.644
14	101	(Spain) Jorge Zaragoza	Honda	1:45.940	+2.818
15	10	(Netherlands) Calvin Vlaanderen	KTM	1:45.949	+2.827
16	251	(Belgium) Jens Getteman	KTM	1:46.161	+3.039
17	161	(Sweden) Alvin Östlund	Yamaha	1:46.607	+3.485
18	29	(Germany) Henry Jacobi	Honda	1:46.748	+3.626
19	71	(Belgium) Damon Graulus	Honda	1:47.049	+3.927
20	97	(Bulgaria) Michael Ivanov	KTM	1:47.174	+4.052
21	189	(Netherlands) Brian Bogers	KTM	1:47.261	+4.139
22	88	(Netherlands) Freek van der Vlist	Kawasaki	1:47.706	+4.584
23	321	(Italy) Samuele Bernardini	TM	1:47.827	+4.705
24	919	(United Kingdom) Ben Watson	Husqvarna	1:48.136	+5.014
25	132	(Estonia) Karel Kutsar	KTM	1:50.355	+7.233
26	174	(United Kingdom) Alfie Smith	Yamaha	1:52.586	+9.464

MX2 Timed Practice

Position	No.	Driver	Constructor	Time	Time Gap
1	4	(France) Dylan Ferrandis	Kawasaki	1:42.677	
2	84	(Netherlands) Jeffrey Herlings	KTM	1:44.465	+1.788
3	152	(Bulgaria) Petar Petrov	Kawasaki	1:44.756	+2.079
4	59	(Russia) Aleksandr Tonkov	Yamaha	1:45.068	+2.391
5	64	(United States) Thomas Covington	Husqvarna	1:45.068	+2.391
6	41	(Latvia) Pauls Jonass	KTM	1:45.392	+2.715
7	189	(Netherlands) Brian Bogers	KTM	1:45.494	+2.817
8	6	(France) Benoit Paturel	Yamaha	1:45.743	+3.066
9	91	(Switzerland) Jeremy Seewer	Suzuki	1:45.822	+3.145
10	99	(United Kingdom) Max Anstie	Husqvarna	1:46.019	+3.342
11	172	(Belgium) Brent van Donninck	Yamaha	1:46.130	+3.453
12	251	(Belgium) Jens Getteman	KTM	1:46.209	+3.532
13	18	(Russia) Vsevolod Brylyakov	Kawasaki	1:46.375	+3.698
14	46	(Netherlands) Davy Pootjes	KTM	1:46.553	+3.876
15	101	(Spain) Jorge Zaragoza	Honda	1:46.680	+4.003
16	97	(Bulgaria) Michael Ivanov	KTM	1:46.777	+4.100
17	71	(Belgium) Damon Graulus	Honda	1:47.515	+4.838
18	321	(Italy) Samuele Bernardini	TM	1:47.592	+4.915
19	161	(Sweden) Alvin Östlund	Yamaha	1:47.690	+5.013
20	174	(United Kingdom) Alfie Smith	Yamaha	1:48.432	+5.755
21	29	(Germany) Henry Jacobi	Honda	1:48.528	+5.851
22	88	(Netherlands) Freek van der Vlist	Kawasaki	1:49.107	+6.430
23	919	(United Kingdom) Ben Watson	Husqvarna	1:49.222	+6.545
24	132	(Estonia) Karel Kutsar	KTM	1:49.405	+6.782
25	811	(United Kingdom) Adam Sterry^{1}	KTM	1:49.571	+6.894
26	10	(Netherlands) Calvin Vlaanderen	KTM	1:54.466	+11.789

^{1} Adam Sterry did not take further part in the Grand Prix due to a wrist injury picked up in timed practice.

=== MX2 Qualifying Race ===
Position	No.	Driver	Constructor	Laps	Time Gap
1	84	(Netherlands) Jeffrey Herlings	KTM	13	
2	4	(France) Dylan Ferrandis	Kawasaki	13	+1.783
3	41	(Latvia) Pauls Jonass	KTM	13	+35.137
4	91	(Switzerland) Jeremy Seewer	Suzuki	13	+38.236
5	6	(France) Benoit Paturel	Yamaha	13	+39.310
6	152	(Bulgaria) Petar Petrov	Kawasaki	13	+42.207
7	59	(Russia) Aleksandr Tonkov	Yamaha	13	+49.764
8	18	(Russia) Vsevolod Brylyakov	Kawasaki	13	+51.811
9	99	(United Kingdom) Max Anstie	Husqvarna	13	+54.116
10	46	(Netherlands) Davy Pootjes	KTM	13	+1:02.236
11	251	(Belgium) Jens Getteman	KTM	13	+1:08.536
12	321	(Italy) Samuele Bernardini	TM	13	+1:12.636
13	172	(Belgium) Brent van Doninck	Yamaha	13	+1:15.178
14	919	(United Kingdom) Ben Watson	KTM	13	+1:18.380
15	189	(Netherlands) Brian Bogers	KTM	13	+1:32.779
16	29	(Germany) Henry Jacobi	Honda	13	+1:33.758
17	132	(Estonia) Karel Kutsar	KTM	13	+1:35.647
18	101	(Spain) Jorge Zaragoza	Honda	13	+1:37.935
19	71	(Belgium) Damon Graulus	Honda	13	+1:39.298
20	161	(Sweden) Alvin Östlund	Yamaha	13	+1:46.573
21	97	(Bulgaria) Michael Ivanov	KTM	13	+1:46.906
22	88	(Netherlands) Freek van der Vlist	Kawasaki	12	+ 1 Lap
	10	(Netherlands) Calvin Vlaanderen^{1}	KTM	3	
	64	(United States) Thomas Covington	Husqvarna	1	
	174	(United Kingdom) Alfie Smith^{2}	Yamaha	0	
	811	(United Kingdom) Adam Sterry	KTM		Did not start

^{1} Calvin Vlaanderen did not take any further part in the Grand Prix after aggravating an ankle injury in timed practice.

^{2} Alfie Smith did not take any further part in the Grand Prix after picking up an injury in practice.

=== MX2 Races ===
Race 1

Position	No.	Driver	Constructor	Laps	Time Gap	Points
1	84	(Netherlands) Jeffrey Herlings	KTM	18		25
2	4	(France) Dylan Ferrandis	Kawasaki	18	+2.127	22
3	41	(Latvia) Pauls Jonass	KTM	18	+36.086	20
4	91	(Switzerland) Jeremy Seewer	Suzuki	18	+39.609	18
5	59	(Russia) Aleksandr Tonkov	Yamaha	18	+45.698	16
6	152	(Bulgaria) Petar Petrov	Kawasaki	18	+46.475	15
7	321	(Italy) Samuele Bernardini	TM	18	+54.016	14
8	172	(Belgium) Brent van Doninck	Yamaha	18	+1:00.550	13
9	251	(Belgium) Jens Getteman	KTM	18	+1:08.121	12
10	99	(United Kingdom) Max Anstie	Husqvarna	18	+1:12.918	11
11	64	(United States) Thomas Covington	Husqvarna	18	+1:19.051	10
12	161	(Sweden) Alvin Östlund	Yamaha	18	+1:21.324	9
13	189	(Netherlands) Brian Bogers	KTM	18	+1:24.675	8
14	919	(United Kingdom) Ben Watson	Husqvarna	18	+1:25.985	7
15	29	(Germany) Henry Jacobi	Honda	18	+1:56.695	6
16	132	(Estonia) Karel Kutsar	KTM	17	+1 Lap	5
17	71	(Belgium) Damon Graulus	Honda	17	+1 Lap	4
18	88	(Netherlands) Freek van der Vlist	Kawasaki	17	+1 Lap	3
19	97	(Bulgaria) Michael Ivanov	KTM	17	+1 Lap	2
20	101	(Spain) Jorge Zaragoza	Honda	17	+1 Lap	1
	6	(France) Benoit Paturel	Yamaha	12	Retired	
	18	(Russia) Vsevolod Brylyakov	Kawasaki	11	Retired	
	46	(Netherlands) Davy Pootjes^{1}	KTM	7	Retired	
	10	(Netherlands) Calvin Vlaanderen	KTM		Did Not Start	
	174	(United Kingdom) Alfie Smith	Yamaha		Did Not Start	
	811	(United Kingdom) Adam Sterry	KTM		Did Not Start	

^{1} Davy Pootjes broke his collarbone in this race and did not take part in the second race.

Race 2

Position	No.	Driver	Constructor	Laps	Time Gap	Points
1	84	(Netherlands) Jeffrey Herlings	KTM	18		25
2	4	(France) Dylan Ferrandis	Kawasaki	18	+17.253	22
3	41	(Latvia) Pauls Jonass	KTM	18	+33.722	20
4	172	(Belgium) Brent van Doninck	Yamaha	18	+35.284	18
5	91	(Switzerland) Jeremy Seewer	Suzuki	18	+36.687	16
6	152	(Bulgaria) Petar Petrov	Kawasaki	18	+38.114	15
7	59	(Russia) Aleksandr Tonkov	Yamaha	18	+39.889	14
8	6	(France) Benoit Paturel	Yamaha	18	+51.246	13
9	18	(Russia) Vsevolod Brylyakov	Kawasaki	18	+52.150	12
10	321	(Italy) Samuele Bernardini	TM	18	+1:07.939	11
11	101	(Spain) Jorge Zaragoza	Honda	18	+1:19.466	10
12	189	(Netherlands) Brian Bogers	KTM	18	+1:22.199	9
13	71	(Belgium) Damon Graulus	Honda	18	+1:24.406	8
14	919	(United Kingdom) Ben Watson	Husqvarna	18	+1:25.592	7
15	64	(United States) Thomas Covington	Husqvarna	18	+1:40.219	6
16	251	(Belgium) Jens Getteman	KTM	18	+1:44.040	5
17	161	(Sweden) Alvin Östlund	Yamaha	18	+1:47.376	4
18	29	(Germany) Henry Jacobi	Honda	18	+1:47.893	3
19	88	(Netherlands) Freek van der Vlist	Kawasaki	18	+1:50.551	2
20	132	(Estonia) Karel Kutsar	KTM	17	+1 Lap	1
	97	(Bulgaria) Michael Ivanov	KTM	2	Retired	
	99	(United Kingdom) Max Anstie	Husqvarna	0	Retired	
	46	(Netherlands) Davy Pootjes	KTM		Did Not Start	
	10	(Netherlands) Calvin Vlaanderen	KTM		Did Not Start	
	174	(United Kingdom) Alfie Smith	Yamaha		Did Not Start	
	811	(United Kingdom) Adam Sterry	KTM		Did Not Start	

=== MX2 Grand Prix Overall ===
Position	No.	Driver	Constructor	Race 1	Race 2	Points
1	84	(Netherlands) Jeffrey Herlings	KTM	25	25	50
2	4	(France) Dylan Ferrandis	Kawasaki	22	22	44
3	41	(Latvia) Pauls Jonass	KTM	20	20	40
4	91	(Switzerland) Jeremy Seewer	Suzuki	18	16	34
5	172	(Belgium) Brent van Doninck	Yamaha	13	18	31
6	152	(Bulgaria) Petar Petrov	Kawasaki	15	15	30
7	59	(Russia) Aleksandr Tonkov	Yamaha	16	14	30
8	321	(Italy) Samuele Bernardini	TM	14	11	25
9	189	(Netherlands) Brian Bogers	KTM	8	9	17
10	251	(Belgium) Jens Getteman	KTM	12	5	17
11	64	(United States) Thomas Covington	Husqvarna	10	6	16
12	919	(United Kingdom) Ben Watson	KTM	7	7	14
13	6	(France) Benoit Paturel	Yamaha	0	13	13
14	161	(Sweden) Alvin Östlund	Yamaha	9	4	13
15	18	(Russia) Vsevolod Brylyakov	Kawasaki	0	12	12
16	71	(Belgium) Damon Graulus	Honda	4	8	12
17	101	(Spain) Jorge Zaragoza	Honda	1	10	11
18	99	(United Kingdom) Max Anstie	Husqvarna	10	0	10
19	29	(Germany) Henry Jacobi	Honda	6	3	9
20	132	(Estonia) Karel Kutsar	KTM	5	1	6
21	88	(Netherlands) Freek van der Vlist	Kawasaki	3	2	5
22	97	(Bulgaria) Michael Ivanov	KTM	2	0	2
	46	(Netherlands) Davy Pootjes	KTM	0	0	0
	10	(Netherlands) Calvin Vlaanderen	KTM	0	0	0
	174	(United Kingdom) Alfie Smith	Yamaha	0	0	0
	811	(United Kingdom) Adam Sterry	KTM	0	0	0

== WMX ==
=== WMX Practice Times ===
Free Practice

Position	No.	Driver	Constructor	Time	Time Gap
1	151	(New Zealand) Courtney Duncan	Yamaha	1:52.326	
2	8	(Italy) Kiara Fontanesi	Honda	1:52.484	+0.158
3	114	(France) Livia Lancelot	Kawasaki	1:52.771	+0.445
4	85	(Netherlands) Nancy van de Ven	Yamaha	1:54.082	+1.756
5	423	(Germany) Larissa Papenmeier	Suzuki	1:54.893	+2.567
6	811	(Norway) Genette Vaage	KTM	1:57.780	+5.454
7	274	(Belgium) Amandine Verstappen	KTM	1:59.477	+7.151
8	44	(Republic of Ireland) Natalie Kane	KTM	2:00.477	+8.151
9	9	(Switzerland) Virginie Germond	Suzuki	2:01.440	+9.114
10	67	(Netherlands) Britt van der Werff	Suzuki	2:01.614	+9.228
11	111	(Germany) Anne Borchers	Suzuki	2:01.837	+9.511
12	52	(France) Justine Charroux	Yamaha	2:02.370	+10.044
13	555	(Sweden) Emelie Dahl	Yamaha	2:03.407	+11.081
14	45	(Netherlands) Gwenda Haans	Husqvarna	2:07.878	+15.552
15	25	(United Kingdom) Stacey Fisher	KTM	2:09.095	+16.769
16	188	(Netherlands) Shana van der Vlist	Yamaha	2:09.172	+16.846

MXW Timed Practice

Position	No.	Driver	Constructor	Time	Time Gap
1	114	(France) Livia Lancelot	Kawasaki	1:53.082	
2	8	(Italy) Kiara Fontanesi	Honda	1:54.442	+1.340
3	85	(Netherlands) Nancy van de Ven	Yamaha	1:54.780	+1.698
4	151	(New Zealand) Courtney Duncan	Yamaha	1:54.998	+1.916
5	423	(Germany) Larissa Papenmeier	Suzuki	1:57.158	+4.076
6	274	(Belgium) Amandine Verstappen	KTM	1:58.125	+5.043
7	811	(Norway) Genette Vaage	KTM	1:59.824	+6.742
8	67	(Netherlands) Britt van der Werff	Suzuki	2:00.645	+7.563
9	44	(Republic of Ireland) Natalie Kane	KTM	2:01.493	+8.411
10	9	(Switzerland) Virginie Germond	Suzuki	2:02.819	+9.737
11	52	(France) Justine Charroux	Yamaha	2:03.083	+10.001
12	111	(Germany) Anne Borchers	Suzuki	2:05.118	+12.036
13	555	(Sweden) Emelie Dahl	Yamaha	2:05.282	+12.200
14	188	(Netherlands) Shana van der Vlist	Yamaha	2:06.012	+12.930
15	25	(United Kingdom) Stacey Fisher	KTM	2:08.539	+15.457
16	45	(Netherlands) Gwenda Haans	Husqvarna	2:09.254	+16.172

=== WMX Races ===
Race 1

Position	No.	Driver	Constructor	Laps	Time Gap	Points
1	151	(New Zealand) Courtney Duncan^{1}	Yamaha	12		25
2	114	(France) Livia Lancelot	Kawasaki	12	+27.377	22
3	85	(Netherlands) Nancy van de Ven	Yamaha	12	+41.292	20
4	423	(Germany) Larissa Papenmeier	Suzuki	12	+49.822	18
5	274	(Belgium) Amandine Verstappen	KTM	12	+1:14.578	16
6	44	(Republic of Ireland) Natalie Kane	KTM	12	+1:22.373	15
7	811	(Norway) Genette Vaage	KTM	12	+1:24.655	14
8	67	(Netherlands) Britt van der Werff	Suzuki	12	+1:36.855	13
9	52	(France) Justine Charroux	Yamaha	12	+2:06.537	12
10	9	(Switzerland) Virginie Germond	Suzuki	12	+2:07.762	11
11	8	(Italy) Kiara Fontanesi	Honda	11	+1 Lap	10
12	111	(Germany) Anne Borchers	Suzuki	11	+1 Lap	9
13	555	(Sweden) Emelie Dahl	Yamaha	11	+1 Lap	8
14	25	(United Kingdom) Stacey Fisher	KTM	11	+1 Lap	7
15	45	(Netherlands) Gwenda Haans	Husqvarna	11	+1 Lap	6
	188	(Netherlands) Shana van der Vlist	Yamaha	0	Retired	5

^{1}Courtney Duncan won her first WMX race on her debut at world championship level.

Race 2

Position	No.	Driver	Constructor	Laps	Time Gap	Points
1	151	(New Zealand) Courtney Duncan^{1}	Yamaha	12		25
2	114	(France) Livia Lancelot	Kawasaki	12	+28.037	22
3	8	(Italy) Kiara Fontanesi	Honda	12	+48.139	20
4	85	(Netherlands) Nancy van de Ven	Yamaha	12	+1:00.122	18
5	423	(Germany) Larissa Papenmeier	Suzuki	12	+1:37.023	16
6	44	(Republic of Ireland) Natalie Kane	KTM	12	+1:54.701	15
7	67	(Netherlands) Britt van der Werff	Suzuki	12	+1:58.400	14
8	52	(France) Justine Charroux	Yamaha	12	+2:04.932	13
9	111	(Germany) Anne Borchers	Suzuki	12	+2:07.702	12
10	25	(United Kingdom) Stacey Fisher	KTM	11	+1 Lap	11
11	188	(Netherlands) Shana van der Vlist	Yamaha	11	+1 Lap	10
12	555	(Sweden) Emelie Dahl	Yamaha	11	+1 Lap	9
13	9	(Switzerland) Virginie Germond	Suzuki	11	+1 Lap	8
14	274	(Belgium) Amandine Verstappen	KTM	11	+1 Lap	7
	811	(Norway) Genette Vaage	KTM	0	Retired	6
	45	(Netherlands) Gwenda Haans	Husqvarna		Did Not Start	

^{1}Courtney Duncan took her first double race win on her world championship debut.

=== WMX Grand Prix Overall ===
Position	No.	Driver	Constructor	Race 1	Race 2	Points
1	151	(New Zealand) Courtney Duncan^{1}	Yamaha	25	25	50
2	114	(France) Livia Lancelot	Kawasaki	22	22	44
3	85	(Netherlands) Nancy van de Ven	Yamaha	20	18	38
4	423	(Germany) Larissa Papenmeier	Suzuki	18	16	34
5	8	(Italy) Kiara Fontanesi	Honda	10	20	30
6	44	(Republic of Ireland) Natalie Kane	KTM	15	15	30
7	67	(Netherlands) Britt van der Werff	Suzuki	13	14	27
8	52	(France) Justine Charroux	Yamaha	12	13	25
9	274	(Belgium) Amandine Verstappen	KTM	16	7	23
10	111	(Germany) Anne Borchers	Suzuki	9	12	21
11	811	(Norway) Genette Vaage	KTM	14	6	20
12	9	(Switzerland) Virginie Germond	Suzuki	11	8	19
13	25	(United Kingdom) Stacey Fisher	KTM	7	11	18
14	555	(Sweden) Emelie Dahl	Yamaha	8	9	17
15	188	(Netherlands) Shana van der Vlist	Yamaha	5	10	15
16	45	(Netherlands) Gwenda Haans	Husqvarna	6	0	6

^{1}Courtney Duncan won her first WMX overall grand prix on her debut in the world championship.
