= Arco Castle =

Castle in Arco, Italy

Coordinates: 45°55′18″N 10°53′16″E

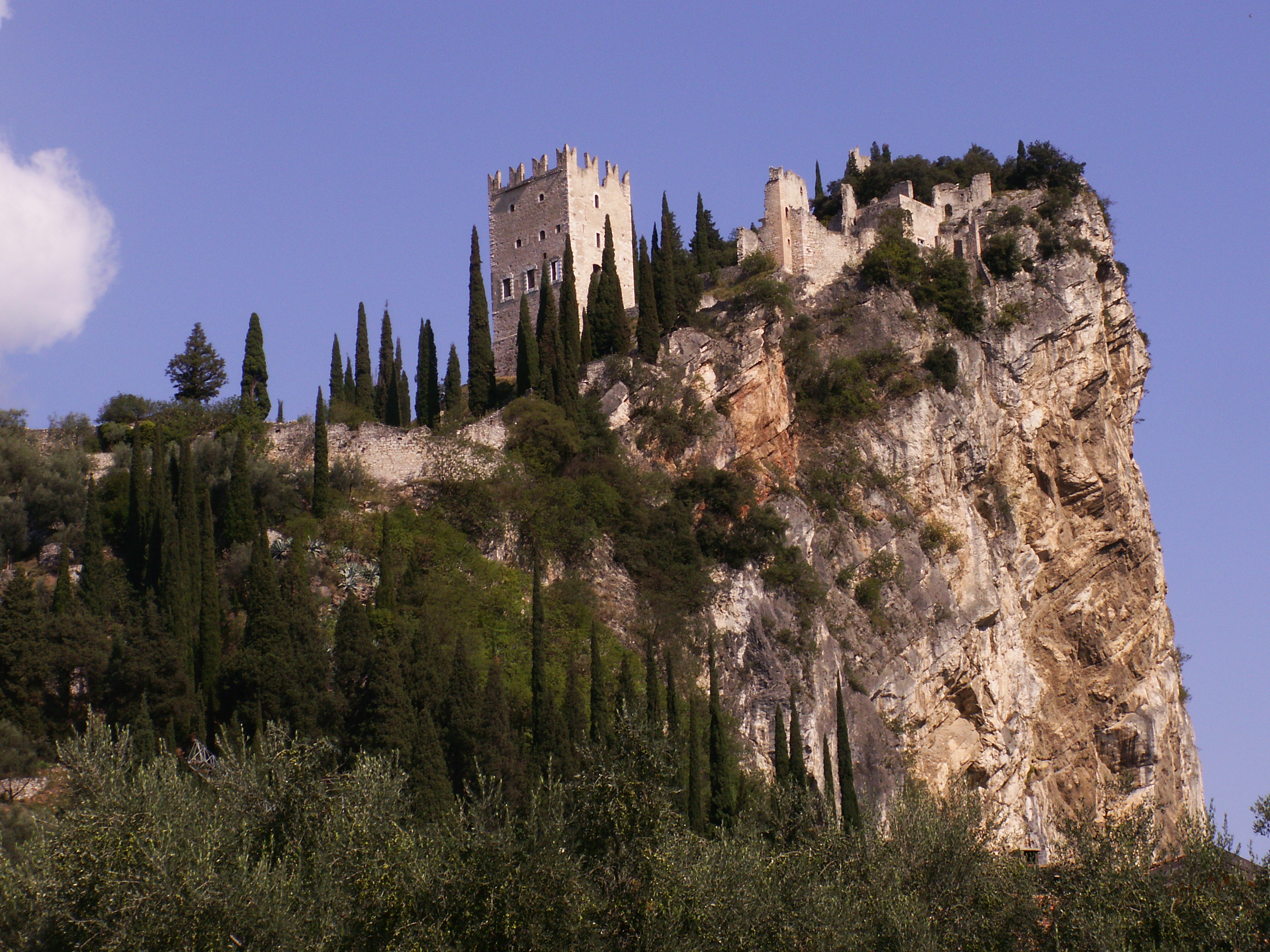
Arco Castle ruins

Arco Castle (Italian: Castello di Arco, German: Schloss Arch) is a ruined castle located on a prominent spur high above Arco and the Sarca Valley in Trentino, northern Italy.

== History ==
The exact date of its foundation is unknown but it existed at least after the year 1000 AD. The area around Arco was inhabited already before the Middle Ages, the castle was said to have been built by the citizens and only later becoming the property of the local nobles.

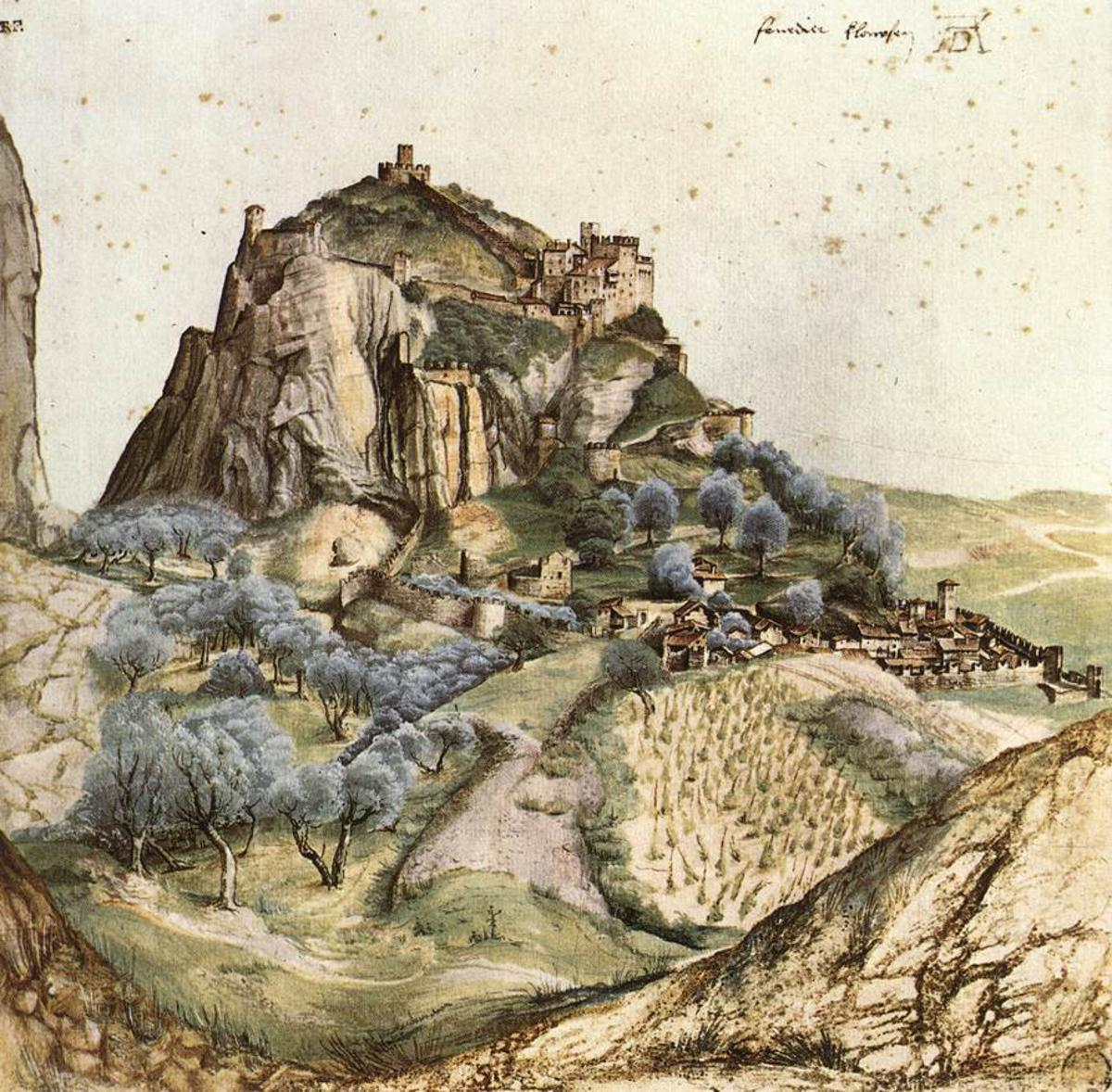
View of Arco, watercolor on paper by Albrecht Dürer (1495)

The counts of Arco (from Latin arcus, 'bow'), probably of Italian origin (a presumed kinship with the Bavarian counts of Bogen could not be established), were first mentioned in 1124 deed; they temporarily served as liensmen of the Trent prince-bishops. Though they were raised to comital (Grafen) status by the Hohenstaufen emperor Frederick II in 1221, they had to acknowledge the overlordship of the Meinhardiner princely counts of Tyrol in 1272.

The Counts of Arco were expelled by the Prince-Bishops of Trent in 1349, whereafter the castle fell to the Veronese noble house of Scaliger. Nevertheless, they regained the castle in a local uprising, and in 1413 further strengthened their position by obtaining the status of Imperial immediacy from the hands of Emperor Sigismund in 1413. However, in the long run, they could not prevail against the mighty House of Habsburg, rulers of Tyrol since 1363. Arco Castle was captured in 1579, and the counts had to submit to the Habsburgs in 1614. Their estates were officially seized by Emperor Leopold I in 1680.

The castle was later abandoned after a siege by French troops under General Duke Louis Joseph of Vendôme in the course of the War of the Spanish Succession in 1703. A careful restoration began 1986 and following others in more recent years restorations have found a number of frescoes depicting knights and court ladies of medieval times.
