= Veronika Minina =

Estonian athletics competitor

Veronika Minina (since 1984 Triisa; born 29 June 1955) is an Estonian athletics competitor.

She was born in Viljandi.

She began athletics training at the age of 11 in Viljandi, coached by Aita Peters. Later, in Tallinn, she was coached by Jüri Murakas and Vello Palm. She is multiple-times Estonian champion in shot put.

Her personal best was 18.03 (1980).

Her son is motorsport driver Toomas Triisa.
