= Toomas Triisa =

Estonian motorcycle racer

Personal information
- Nationality: (Estonia) Estonian
- Born: November 12, 1982 (age 43) Tallinn, then part of Estonian SSR, Soviet Union
- Years active: 1997–present
- Height: 189 cm (6 ft 2 in)
- Weight: 92 kg (203 lb)
- Spouse: Signe Triisa

Sport
- Country: Estonia
- Sport: Rally raid
- Team: Rally Raid Estonia

Toomas Triisa (born 12 November 1982) is an Estonian rally driver. Triisa won 2017 Dakar Rally Malle Moto class. He is the Estonian champion in various rally classes such as motocross.

== Dakar results ==
Year	Class	Vehicle	Position	Stages won
2014	Bikes	(Sweden) Husqvarna 450 Rally Factory Replica	55th	0
2017	Bikes	(Sweden) Husqvarna 450 Rally Factory Replica	30th	0
2023	SSV	(Canada) Can-Am	11th	0

== Achievements ==
- 1999 – Estonia Motocross Championship: 1st place overall.
- 1999 – Estonian Stadium Motocross Championship: 1st place overall.
- 2004 – Estonian Ice Racing Championship: 1st place in Open class.
- 2005 – Gotland Grand National Enduro: 1st place in class 4.
- 2006 – Gotland Grand National Enduro: 2nd place in class 4.
- 2007 – Estonian Ice Racing Championship: 1st place in MX1 class.
- 2014 – Dakar Rally: 55th place in Bikes class.
- 2017 – Dakar Rally: 30th place in Bikes class and 1st place in Malle Moto class.
- 2022 – Rally Breslau: 15th place
- 2022 – Rallye du Maroc: 9th place
- 2023 – Dakar Rally: 46th place overall and 11th place in T4 class.

== Personal ==
His mother is former athlete Veronika Minina.
