= Méthamis =

- Commune
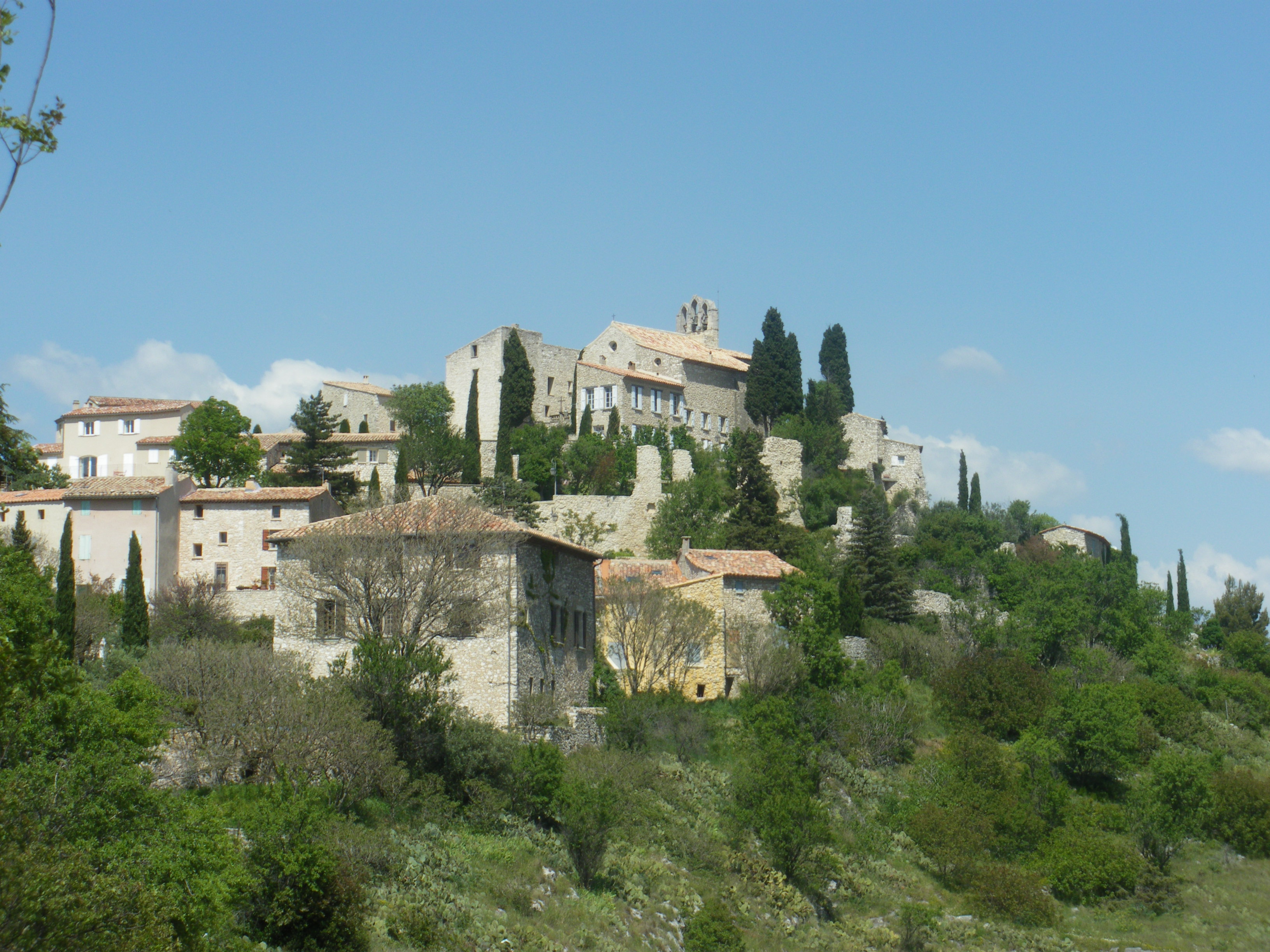
- Village of Méthamis

- Coat of arms
- Location of Méthamis
- Location within France Location within Provence-Alpes-Côte d'Azur
- Coordinates: 44°00′55″N 5°13′29″E
- Country: France
- Region: Provence-Alpes-Côte d'Azur
- Department: Vaucluse
- Arrondissement: Carpentras
- Canton: Pernes-les-Fontaines

Government
  - Mayor (2020–2026): Jean-Marc Teste
- Area^{1}: 36.81 km^{2} (14.21 sq mi)
- Elevation: 318 m (1,043 ft)
- Highest elevation: 891 m (2,923 ft)
- Lowest elevation: 228 m (748 ft)
- Population (2023): 450
  - Density: 12/km^{2} (32/sq mi)
- Time zone: UTC+01:00 (CET)
  - Summer (DST): UTC+02:00 (CEST)
- INSEE/Postal code: 84075 /84570
- ^{1} French Land Register data, which excludes lakes, ponds, glaciers > 1 km^{2} (0.386 sq mi or 247 acres) and river estuaries.

Méthamis (French pronunciation: [metamis]; Occitan: Metàmis) is a commune in the Vaucluse department in the Provence-Alpes-Côte d'Azur region in southeastern France.

== See also ==
- Communes of the Vaucluse department
