= Livia Lancelot =

French motorcycle racer (born 1988)

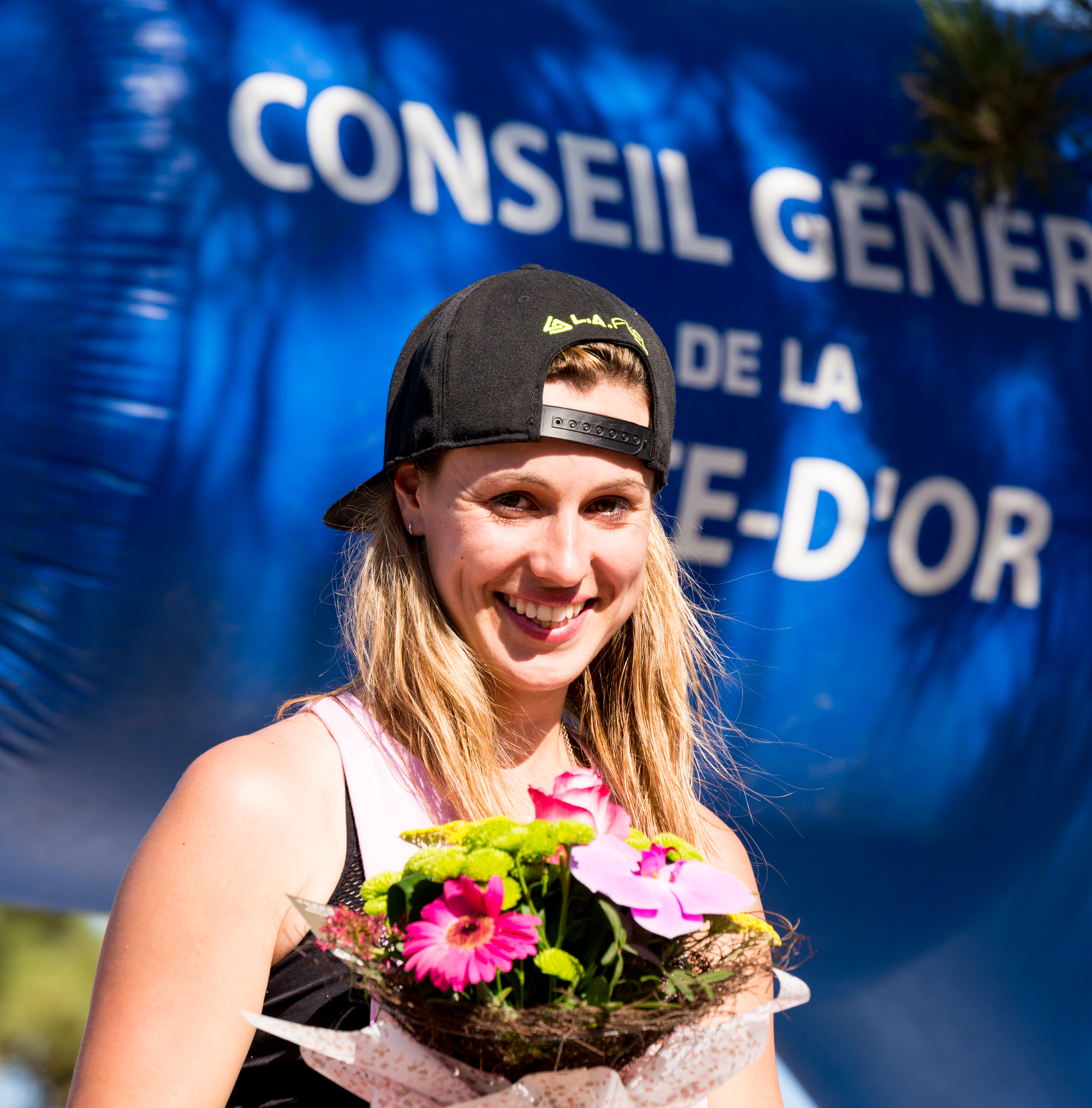
- Lancelot in 2015
- Nationality: French
- Born: 11 February 1988 (age 38) Saint-Denis, France

Motocross career
- Championships: Women's MX - 2008, 2016

Livia Lancelot (French: [livia lɑ̃slo]; born 11 February 1988) is a French professional motocross racer.

Born in Saint-Denis, France, Lancelot became the first ever Women's world champion in the history of motocross, winning the inaugural FIM Women's Motocross World Championship in 2008. Lancelot was awarded the Circuiti Gioielli Women's Pole Position Award in Mantua, Italy, and has also won some other competitions. She repeated as Women's motocross world champion in 2016.

== Career results ==
Year	Bike	Team	Competition	Result
2017	Kawasaki	Team 114	FIM Women's Motocross World Championship	2nd
2016	Kawasaki	Team 114	FIM Women's Motocross World Championship	1st
2015	Kawasaki	Team 114	FIM Women's Motocross World Championship	2nd
2014	Kawasaki	Team 114	FIM Women's Motocross World Championship	3rd
2011	Kawasaki	Bud Racing	FIM Women's Motocross World Championship	2nd
2010	KTM	KTM HDI	FIM Women's Motocross World Championship	2nd
2009	Kawasaki	KRT	Grand Prix of Portugal	1st
2008	Kawasaki	GPKR	FIM Women's Motocross World Championship	1st
2007	Kawasaki	GPKR	FIM Women's Motocross World Cup	2nd
2006	Yamaha	Privateer	FIM Women's Motocross World Cup	3rd
2005	Yamaha	Privateer	FIM Women's Motocross World Cup	3rd
