= Arco, Trentino =

Arco
- Comune
- Città di Arco
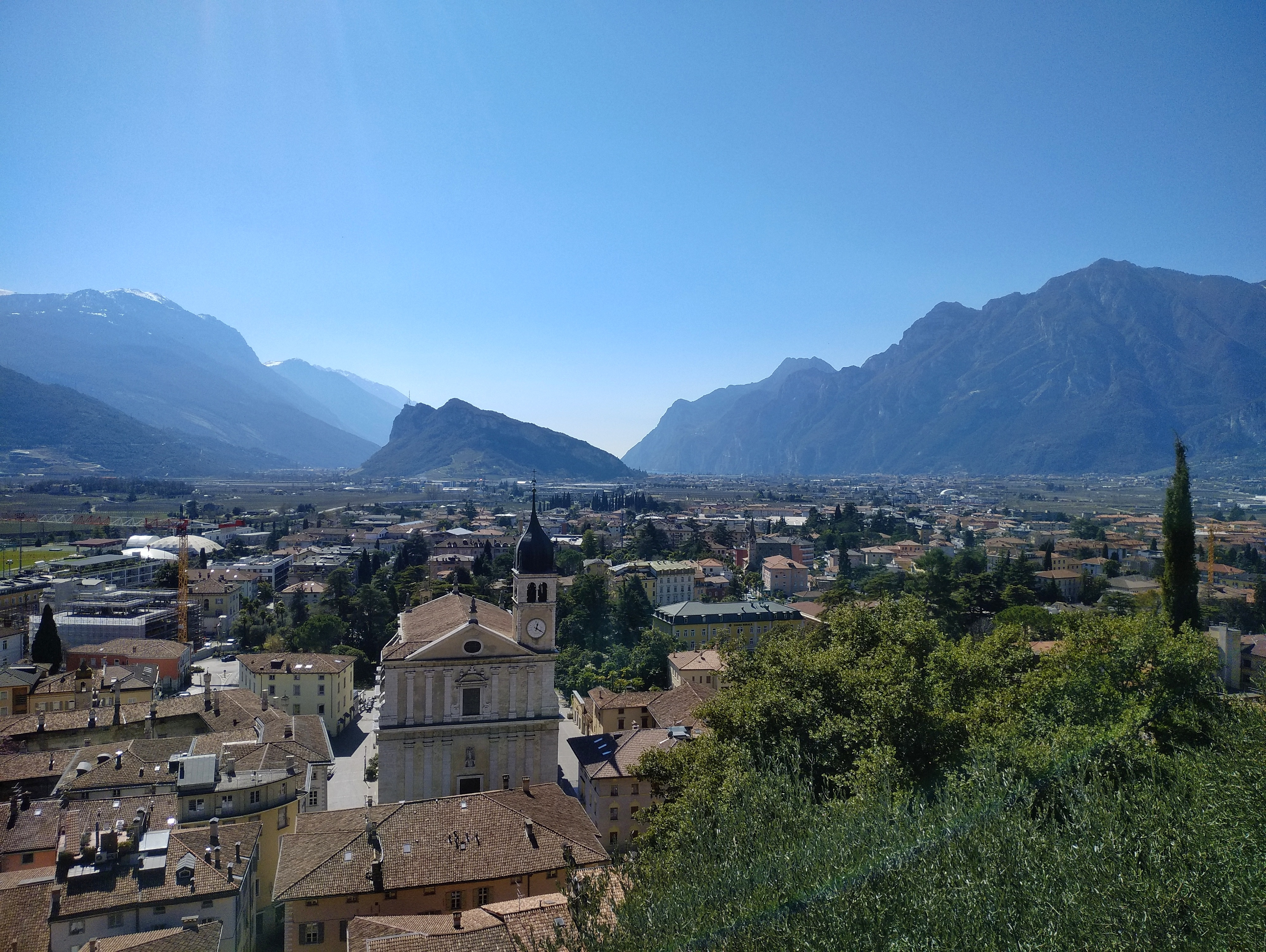

- Coat of arms

- Location of Arco in Italy Arco (Trentino-Alto Adige/Südtirol)
- Coordinates: 45°55′N 10°53′E
- Country: Italy
- Region: Trentino-Alto Adige/Südtirol
- Province: Trentino (TN)
- Frazioni: Bolognano, Caneve, Ceole, Chiarano, Laghel, Linfano, Massone, Mogno, Padaro, Pratosaiano, San Giorgio d'Arco, San Giovanni al Monte, San Martino d'Oltresarca, Varignano, Vigne di Romarzolo, Vignole

Government
  - Mayor: Arianna Fiorio

Area
  - Total: 63 km^{2} (24 sq mi)
- Elevation: 91 m (299 ft)

Population (2026)
  - Total: 17,747
  - Density: 280/km^{2} (730/sq mi)
- Demonym: Arcensi
- Time zone: UTC+1 (CET)
  - Summer (DST): UTC+2 (CEST)
- Postal code: 38062
- Dialing code: 0464
- Patron saint: Saint Anne
- Saint day: 26 July
- Website: Official website

Arco is a comune in Trentino-Alto Adige in northern Italy. The town is faced on one side by sheer limestone cliffs jutting up like a wall protecting it and its ancient hilltop castle. King Francis II of the Two Sicilies died there in 1894.

== Main sights ==
- The Castello di Arco, medieval castle
- Sanctuary and convent of Santa Maria delle Grazie, built in 1475–1492. It houses a wooden statue of the Virgin Mary dating to the 15th century
- Collegiata dell'Assunta, begun in 1613. Francis II, the last King of Two Sicilies, was provisionally buried here in the late 19th century, after his death at Arco in 1894.
- Church of Sant'Apollinare, with 14th-century frescoes
- Palazzo Marchettii (16th century). It has a portal attributed to Giulio Romano.
- Palazzo dei Panni (late 17th century)
- Stations of the Cross to the chapel "Santuario della Madonna di Laghel" 1896 by Josef Moroder-Lusenberg

== Economy ==
Tourism is a major part of the local economy, with many Germans and Austrians coming over the Brenner Pass from Austria. Popular tourist activities include windsurfing on nearby Lake Garda, and rock climbing on the walls near the city. The annual Rock Master event, an international climbing competition, is held on the town's outdoor artificial wall. Mountain biking is popular and international bikers flock to the town.

Agriculture is also important, with vines and citrus orchards filling the valley opposite the castle. Agro-chemical plants line the river Sarca towards the lake.

== Twin towns ==
- Schotten, Germany, since 1960
- Bogen, Germany, since 1983
- Roccella Ionica, Italy, since 2007
- Maybole, Scotland

== Climate ==
Climate data for Arco
| Month | Jan | Feb | Mar | Apr | May | Jun | Jul | Aug | Sep | Oct | Nov | Dec | Year |
|---|---|---|---|---|---|---|---|---|---|---|---|---|---|
| Mean daily maximum °C (°F) | 7 (45) | 10 (50) | 16 (61) | 19 (66) | 24 (75) | 27 (81) | 29 (84) | 29 (84) | 24 (75) | 18 (64) | 11 (52) | 7 (45) | 18 (65) |
| Mean daily minimum °C (°F) | −4 (25) | −1 (30) | 4 (39) | 6 (43) | 11 (52) | 15 (59) | 17 (63) | 16 (61) | 12 (54) | 8 (46) | 2 (36) | −3 (27) | 7 (45) |
Source: worldweatheronline.com
