= 2023 FIM Women's Motocross World Championship =

Motocross championship season

The 2023 FIM Women's Motocross World Championship was the 19th Women's Motocross World Championship season. Nancy van de Ven was the defending champion, after taking her first title in 2022 and Yamaha is the defending Manufacturing champion.

== 2023 Calendar ==
A 6-round calendar for the 2023 season was announced on 11 October 2022.

Round	Date	Grand Prix	Location	Race 1 Winner	Race 2 Winner	Round Winner	Report
1	March 26	Sardinia	Riola Sardo	(Netherlands) Lotte van Drunen	(Spain) Daniela Guillén	(Spain) Daniela Guillén	
2	April 10	Switzerland	Frauenfeld	(New Zealand) Courtney Duncan	(Netherlands) Lotte van Drunen	(New Zealand) Courtney Duncan	
3	May 7	Spain	intu Xanadú	(New Zealand) Courtney Duncan	(New Zealand) Courtney Duncan	(New Zealand) Courtney Duncan	
4	May 21	France	Villars-sous-Écot	(New Zealand) Courtney Duncan	(New Zealand) Courtney Duncan	(New Zealand) Courtney Duncan	
5	August 20	Netherlands	Arnhem	(Netherlands) Lotte van Drunen	(Netherlands) Lotte van Drunen	(Netherlands) Lotte van Drunen	
6	September 3	Turkey	Afyonkarahisar	(New Zealand) Courtney Duncan	(Netherlands) Lynn Valk	(New Zealand) Courtney Duncan	

== Participants ==
Team	Constructor	No	Rider	Rounds
GF4 Motorsport Racing Team	Honda	4	(Italy) Gaia Franchi	1–2
GF4 Motorsport Racing Team	Honda	47	(Italy) Gaia Oddo	1
Van de Laar Racing	Yamaha	5	(Netherlands) Britt Jans-Beken	All
Van de Laar Racing	Yamaha	188	(Netherlands) Shana van der Vlist	1–3, 5–6
JK Racing Yamaha	Yamaha	7	(Australia) Charli Cannon	1–4, 6
JK Racing Yamaha	Yamaha	71	(Romania) Aida Cojanu	6
MX Fonta Racing Syneco	Gas Gas	8	(Italy) Kiara Fontanesi	1–5
MX Fonta Racing Syneco	Gas Gas	94	(Italy) Priska Busatto	1–2
Team Dragon Moto	KTM	9	(Switzerland) Virginie Germond	1–4
Team Dragon Moto	KTM	74	(Switzerland) Joyce Zachmann	2
Seles Moto	KTM	11	(Croatia) Mia Ribić	2
Team VHR Racing	Gas Gas	14	(France) Mathilde Martinez	1–5
Team VHR Racing	Gas Gas	49	(Colombia) Alicia Göggel	3–4
Iran National Team	Yamaha	17	(Iran) Mahdis Heydarnezhadgorji	6
Iran National Team	Yamaha	20	(Iran) Hasti Rezaei	6
Zweiradsport Brunner	Kawasaki	18	(Germany) Katharina Schultz	2, 4–5
Jaccover	Yamaha	22	(Turkey) Selen Tınaz	6
Yamaha Čepelák Racing	Yamaha	23	(Czech Republic) Aneta Čepeláková	1–2, 4
Team Yamaha New Bike	Yamaha	24	(France) Lea Chaput	1–2, 4–5
Team Yamaha New Bike	Yamaha	130	(France) Jessie Joineau	
Team Yamaha New Bike	Yamaha	274	(Belgium) Amandine Verstappen	1–2, 4
Millionaire Racing Team	Gas Gas	28	(Italy) Elisa Galvagno	1
	Yamaha	30	(Belgium) Brenda Wagemans	
	Kawasaki	32	(Spain) Alba Fernández	3
KTM Italy	KTM	34	(Italy) Emanuela Talucci	1–2, 4
	KTM	51	(Netherlands) Jenitty van der Beek	1–4
Yamaha Scandinavia	Yamaha	53	(Denmark) Barbara Aagaard Andersen	1–2, 4–5
	KTM	62	(Switzerland) Michelle Zünd	2
	Yamaha	67	(Netherlands) Britt Van Der Werff	5
RFME WMX Team	Gas Gas	79	(Spain) Gabriela Seisdedos	1, 3, 5–6
RFME WMX Team	Gas Gas	255	(Spain) Daniela Guillén	All
Ceres 71 Yamaha Team	Yamaha	85	(Netherlands) Nancy van de Ven	1–4
	Kawasaki	86	(Switzerland) Ramona Gassmann	2
	Gas Gas	88	(Turkey) Irmak Yıldırım	6
Vogelsang Powersports	Yamaha	90	(Switzerland) Sandra Keller	2
	KTM	91	(Switzerland) Rahel Suter	2
	Yamaha	96	(Netherlands) Maureen Zweers	5
	Kawasaki	99	(Netherlands) Suzy Tausch	2
	KTM	101	(Switzerland) Loane Sudan	2
GripMesser Racing Team	Fantic	111	(Germany) Anne Borchers	2, 4–5
MBP Motocross Team	KTM	118	(Lithuania) Adrija Skudutytė	1–2, 4–5
	Gas Gas	124	(Austria) Alina Barthel	2, 4
Gabriel SS24 KTM	KTM	125	(United Kingdom) Lauren Collingwood	4
Ausio Racing Team	Yamaha	128	(Spain) Jana Sánchez	3–4
FlyOver Competition Gaerne	Kawasaki	131	(Italy) Giorgia Montini	1–5
Team JS Racing	Honda	137	(France) Lisa Guerber	2, 4
Team JS Racing	Honda	229	(France) Lena Marques	4
	Husqvarna	143	(Netherlands) Stephanie Stoutjesdijk	3–4
Big Van World MTX Kawasaki	Kawasaki	151	(New Zealand) Courtney Duncan	All
Team West Friends MX	KTM	153	(France) April Franzoni	2–5
Fantic Factory Team Maddii	Fantic	172	(Netherlands) Lynn Valk	All
MCR Racing Team Husqvarna	Husqvarna	174	(Italy) Giorgia Giudici	3–4
	Yamaha	194	(Italy) Alice Giorda	1
Team JPR	Yamaha	203	(France) Camille Viaud	4
	Fantic	211	(Netherlands) Kaylee van Dam	5
UK Racing Team	KTM	212	(Spain) Aitana Peña	3
	Kawasaki	237	(Germany) Celine Abel	
Team Ship to Cycle Honda Motoblouz SR	Honda	290	(France) Mathilde Denis	4
	Gas Gas	302	(Belgium) Maïté Stroo	4–5
Matt Gardiner MX KTM Race Team	KTM	310	(United Kingdom) Lucy Barker	5
Flexbox Racing	KTM	325	(Denmark) Sara Andersen	All
	Honda	360	(Germany) Tabea Zimmermann	5
JWR Honda Racing	Honda	374	(Sweden) Sofia Schou	4–5
Laurense Motors Kawasaki	Kawasaki	401	(Netherlands) Lotte van Drunen	All
Made Of Gas Gas	Gas Gas	412	(Italy) Matilde Stilo	1–2
Yamaha Racing 423	Yamaha	423	(Germany) Larissa Papenmeier	All
Yamaha Racing 423	Yamaha	969	(Germany) Fiona Hoppe	1–5
	Gas Gas	425	(Netherlands) Amber Simons	5
Jezyk Racing Team	KTM	469	(United States) Jamie Astudillo	All
Husqvarna Motorcycles Scandinavia	Husqvarna	511	(Norway) Martine Hughes	1, 3–5
	Yamaha	524	(Belgium) Elise De Baere	5
MC Sport Racing Team	Gas Gas	587	(Sweden) Tyra Bäckström	2, 4–5
	Yamaha	612	(Norway) Mathea Selebø	All
	KTM	621	(Germany) Anna Schimmer	5
	Yamaha	644	(Denmark) Laura Raunkjær	2, 5–6
	Gas Gas	699	(Austria) Elena Kapsamer	1–5
KTM Scandinavia	KTM	705	(Denmark) Malou Jakobsen	1–2, 4–5
Hannamax Motorsport	KTM	717	(Netherlands) Danée Gelissen	All
Kawasaki Montelimar	Kawasaki	731	(France) Lysa Raoux	2, 4
	KTM	747	(Germany) Juliane Bihr	4
	KTM	775	(Germany) Alexandra Massury	All
Twenty Racing Suspension	Gas Gas	830	(Netherlands) Britt Siemerink	5
KTM Beddini MX2	KTM	912	(Italy) Giorgia Blasigh	1–4
WMX Evolution	Yamaha	942	(France) Mathilde Sommier	4
	Sherco	967	(Switzerland) Ramona Schwitz	2
KMP Honda Racing	Honda	974	(Germany) Janina Lehmann	All

Points are awarded to finishers of the main races, in the following format:

Position	1st	2nd	3rd	4th	5th	6th	7th	8th	9th	10th	11th	12th	13th	14th	15th	16th	17th	18th	19th	20th
Points	25	22	20	18	16	15	14	13	12	11	10	9	8	7	6	5	4	3	2	1

== Riders Championship ==
Pos	Rider	Bike	SAR (Sardinia)		SUI (Switzerland)		ESP (Spain)		FRA (France)		NED (Netherlands)		TUR (Turkey)		Points
1	(New Zealand) Courtney Duncan	Kawasaki	3	4	1	2	1	1	1	1	4	3	1	2	270
2	(Spain) Daniela Guillén	Gas Gas	2	1	3	4	3	3	3	3	3	2	3	8	240
3	(Netherlands) Lotte van Drunen	Kawasaki	1	3	5	1	7	5	5	4	1	1	5	7	230
4	(Netherlands) Lynn Valk	Fantic	9	5	6	6	4	2	6	6	2	4	4	1	211
5	(Denmark) Sara Andersen	KTM	8	12	7	7	9	8	7	7	7	6	7	3	166
6	(Italy) Kiara Fontanesi	Gas Gas	10	9	2	5	2	Ret	2	2	5	7			157
7	(Germany) Larissa Papenmeier	Yamaha	12	13	8	10	5	7	4	5	DNS	DNS	2	4	145
8	(Netherlands) Britt Jans-Beken	Yamaha	5	7	9	11	Ret	9	11	11	9	8	12	9	130
9	(Australia) Charli Cannon	Yamaha	7	8	4	8	8	4	DSQ	19			6	DNS	106
10	(Netherlands) Shana van der Vlist	Yamaha	4	10	16	17	DNS	DNS			6	5	8	5	98
11	(Netherlands) Danée Gelissen	KTM	14	14	37	12	24	14	12	9	10	9	11	15	90
12	(Norway) Mathea Selebø	Yamaha	13	15	19	18	13	10	18	10	12	Ret	10	13	80
13	(Italy) Giorgia Blasigh	KTM	11	11	11	9	14	13	13	13					73
14	(Norway) Martine Hughes	Husqvarna	17	6			6	17	10	Ret	8	14			69
15	(Netherlands) Nancy van de Ven	Yamaha	Ret	2	Ret	3	12	6	Ret	DNS					66
16	(Spain) Gabriela Seisdedos	Gas Gas	19	16			11	16			14	12	9	6	65
17	(United States) Jamie Astudillo	KTM	22	19	13	13	10	11	16	25	Ret	Ret	13	10	63
18	(France) Mathilde Martinez	Gas Gas	18	18	12	14	15	20	8	12	17	19			57
19	(Belgium) Amandine Verstappen	Yamaha	6	Ret	10	Ret			9	8					51
20	(Denmark) Malou Jakobsen	KTM	16	17					14	24	11	10			50
20	(Denmark) Malou Jakobsen	Husqvarna			14	15									50
21	(Germany) Alexandra Massury	KTM	25	25	17	21	17	18	17	15	28	24	14	14	35
22	(France) April Franzoni	KTM			20	16	16	22	19	23	13	11			31
23	(Austria) Elena Kapsamer	Gas Gas	20	20	18	23	18	30	15	18	21	25			17
24	(Germany) Janina Lehmann	Honda	23	27	Ret	28	23	21	36	22	25	21	15	11	16
25	(Denmark) Laura Raunkjær	Yamaha			29	27					23	22	16	12	14
26	(Italy) Giorgia Montini	Kawasaki	21	21	22	20	19	19	20	16	24	18			14
27	(Switzerland) Virginie Germond	KTM	26	28	23	24	Ret	15	21	14					13
28	(Germany) Anne Borchers	Fantic			15	22			22	21	20	15			13
29	(Netherlands) Amber Simons	Gas Gas									15	16			11
30	(Spain) Jana Sánchez	Yamaha					Ret	12	25	27					9
31	(Sweden) Tyra Bäckström	Gas Gas			21	25			35	30	16	17			9
32	(Romania) Aida Cojanu	Yamaha											17	16	9
33	(United Kingdom) Lucy Barker	KTM									22	13			8
34	(Italy) Elisa Galvagno	Gas Gas	15	Ret											6
35	(Iran) Hasti Rezaei	Yamaha											18	18	6
36	(Lithuania) Adrija Skudutytė	KTM	27	22	38	19			29	26	18	20			6
37	(Netherlands) Jenitty van der Beek	KTM	Ret	26	27	37	20	24	Ret	17					5
38	(Turkey) Selen Tınaz	Yamaha											20	17	5
39	(Iran) Mahdis Heydarnezhadgorji	Yamaha											19	20	3
40	(Germany) Fiona Hoppe	Yamaha	Ret	23	24	38	21	27	26	28	19	Ret			2
41	(Turkey) Irmak Yıldırım	Gas Gas											21	19	2
42	(France) Camille Viaud	Yamaha							23	20					1
	(Italy) Giorgia Giudici	Husqvarna					22	23	24	33					0
	(Netherlands) Kaylee van Dam	Fantic									27	23			0
	(Denmark) Barbara Aagaard Andersen	Yamaha	24	24	28	39			DNQ	DNQ	29	30			0
	(Netherlands) Stephanie Stoutjesdijk	Husqvarna					25	26	33	38					0
	(Spain) Aitana Peña	KTM					26	25							0
	(Netherlands) Suzy Tausch	Kawasaki			25	31									0
	(Netherlands) Britt Siemerink	Gas Gas									26	26			0
	(Switzerland) Sandra Keller	Yamaha			26	30									0
	(Croatia) Mia Ribić	KTM			31	26									0
	(Colombia) Alicia Göggel	KTM					27	28	DNQ	DNQ					0
	(France) Lisa Guerber	Honda			30	32			27	32					0
	(Sweden) Sofia Schou	Honda							DNQ	DNQ	30	27			0
	(France) Lea Chaput	Yamaha	31	31	35	33			28	34	32	29			0
	(Italy) Priska Busatto	KTM	28	29	36	34									0
	(Spain) Alba Fernández	Kawasaki					28	29							0
	(Netherlands) Maureen Zweers	Yamaha									31	28			0
	(Italy) Emanuela Talucci	KTM	30	30	32	29			34	35					0
	(Czech Republic) Aneta Čepeláková	Yamaha	29	33	DNQ	DNQ			31	37					0
	(France) Mathilde Denis	Honda							Ret	29					0
	(Germany) Katharina Schultz	Kawasaki			34	36			30	36	Ret	DNS			0
	(Germany) Anna Schimmer	KTM									34	31			0
	(France) Lysa Raoux	Kawasaki			DNQ	DNQ			DNQ	31					0
	(Italy) Gaia Franchi	Honda	32	32	DNQ	DNQ									0
	(Belgium) Maïté Stroo	Gas Gas							DNQ	DNQ	33	32			0
	(France) Mathilde Sommier	Yamaha							32	39					0
	(Italy) Matilde Stilo	Gas Gas	33	35	DNQ	DNQ									0
	(Austria) Alina Barthel	Gas Gas			33	35			DNQ	DNQ					0
	(Belgium) Elise De Baere	Yamaha									36	33			0
	(Italy) Alice Giorda	Yamaha	34	34											0
	(Germany) Tabea Zimmermann	Honda									35	34			0
	(Italy) Gaia Oddo	Honda	35	36											0
	(Netherlands) Britt Van Der Werff	Yamaha									Ret	DNS			0
	(Switzerland) Michelle Zünd	KTM			DNQ	DNQ									0
	(Switzerland) Joyce Zachmann	KTM			DNQ	DNQ									0
	(Switzerland) Loane Sudan	KTM			DNQ	DNQ									0
	(Switzerland) Ramona Schwitz	Sherco			DNQ	DNQ									0
	(Switzerland) Rahel Suter	KTM			DNQ	DNQ									0
	(Switzerland) Ramona Gassmann	Kawasaki			DNQ	DNQ									0
	(United Kingdom) Lauren Collingwood	KTM							DNQ	DNQ					0
	(France) Lena Marques	Honda							DNQ	DNQ					0
	(Germany) Juliane Bihr	KTM							DNQ	DNQ					0
Pos	Rider	Bike	SAR (Sardinia)		SUI (Switzerland)		ESP (Spain)		FRA (France)		NED (Netherlands)		TUR (Turkey)		Points

== Manufacturers Championship ==
Pos	Bike	SAR (Sardinia)		SUI (Switzerland)		ESP (Spain)		FRA (France)		NED (Netherlands)		TUR (Turkey)		Points
1	Kawasaki	1	3	1	1	1	1	1	1	1	1	1	2	292
2	Gas Gas	2	1	2	4	2	3	2	2	3	2	3	6	250
3	Yamaha	4	2	4	3	5	4	4	5	6	5	2	4	217
4	Fantic	9	5	6	6	4	2	6	6	2	4	4	1	211
5	KTM	8	11	7	7	9	8	7	7	7	6	7	3	167
6	Husqvarna	17	6	14	15	6	17	10	33	8	14			82
7	Honda	23	27	30	28	23	21	27	22	13	11	15	11	34
	Sherco			DNQ	DNQ									0
Pos	Bike	SAR (Sardinia)		SUI (Switzerland)		ESP (Spain)		FRA (France)		NED (Netherlands)		TUR (Turkey)		Points
