= 2024 FIM Women's Motocross World Championship =

Motocross championship season

The 2024 FIM Women's Motocross World Championship is the 20th Women's Motocross World Championship season. Courtney Duncan is the defending champion, after taking her fourth title in 2023 and Kawasaki is the defending Manufacturing champion.

== 2024 Calendar ==
A 5-round calendar for the 2024 season was announced on 12 October 2023.

Round	Date	Grand Prix	Location	Race 1 Winner	Race 2 Winner	Round Winner	Report
1	24 March	Spain	intu Xanadú	(Spain) Daniela Guillén	(Spain) Daniela Guillén	(Spain) Daniela Guillén	
2	7 April	Sardinia	Riola Sardo	(Netherlands) Lotte van Drunen	(Netherlands) Lotte van Drunen	(Netherlands) Lotte van Drunen	
3	12 May	Galicia	Lugo	(New Zealand) Courtney Duncan	(Netherlands) Lotte van Drunen	(Netherlands) Lotte van Drunen	
4	2 June	Germany	Teutschenthal	(Spain) Daniela Guillén	(Germany) Larissa Papenmeier	(Germany) Larissa Papenmeier	
5	16 June	Italy	Maggiora	Race Stopped	(Netherlands) Lynn Valk	(Netherlands) Lynn Valk	
6	18 August	Netherlands	Arnhem	(Netherlands) Lotte van Drunen	(Netherlands) Lotte van Drunen	(Netherlands) Lotte van Drunen	
7	8 September	Turkey	Afyonkarahisar	(New Zealand) Courtney Duncan	(Spain) Daniela Guillén	(Spain) Daniela Guillén	

== Participants ==
Team	Constructor	No	Rider	Rounds
F&H Racing Team	Kawasaki	1	(New Zealand) Courtney Duncan	1–3, 5–7
GF4 Motorsport Racing Team	Honda	4	(Italy) Gaia Franchi	2, 4–5
Van de Laar Racing	Yamaha	5	(Netherlands) Britt Jans-Beken	1–2, 6
Van de Laar Racing	Yamaha	188	(Netherlands) Shana van der Vlist	1–4
Six Motorsport	Honda	6	(Italy) Giorgia Montini	5
JM Honda Racing	Honda	7	(Australia) Charli Cannon	7
MX Fonta Racing Syneco	Gas Gas	8	(Italy) Kiara Fontanesi	All
Team Dragon Moto	KTM	9	(Switzerland) Virginie Germond	1–4
SYE Racing Team 423	Yamaha	12	(Germany) Alicia Reitze	3–4
SYE Racing Team 423	Honda	423	(Germany) Larissa Papenmeier	All
SYE Racing Team 423	Yamaha	947	(Germany) Emely Heleenders	1
Team VHR Racing	Gas Gas	14	(France) Mathilde Martinez	1–2
Team VHR Racing	Gas Gas	49	(Colombia) Alicia Göggel	All
KTM-Shop24.de	KTM	17	(Germany) Emely Köhler	4–6
Zweiradsport Brunner	Kawasaki	18	(Germany) Katharina Schultz	4, 6
	Yamaha	20	(Iran) Hasti Rezaei	7
Enduro Istanbul	Yamaha	22	(Turkey) Selen Tınaz	7
Team New Bike Yamaha	Yamaha	24	(France) Lea Chaput	5
Team New Bike Yamaha	Yamaha	274	(Belgium) Amandine Verstappen	5–6
Motostar	Yamaha	25	(Sweden) Sanna Kjellberg	4
Yamaha Čepelák Racing	Yamaha	26	(Czech Republic) Aneta Čepeláková	1–2, 4–5, 7
	Kawasaki	31	(Germany) Johanna Neusüß	4
Pardi Racing KTM Motocross	KTM	34	(Italy) Emanuela Talucci	2, 4–6
Pardi Racing KTM Motocross	KTM	94	(Italy) Priska Busatto	5–6
Yamaha Scandinavia	Yamaha	53	(Denmark) Barbara Aagaard Andersen	1–2, 5–6
	Honda	55	(Germany) Kim Irmgartz	4
	KTM	79	(Poland) Wiktoria Kupczyk	4
	Gas Gas	80	(Italy) Cecilia Polato	4–5, 7
	Yamaha	85	(Netherlands) Nancy van de Ven	6
	Gas Gas	88	(Turkey) Irmak Yıldırım	7
Enduro Koch Racing	Husqvarna	89	(Germany) Gianna Sturzeck	4
	Yamaha	96	(Netherlands) Maureen Zweers	6
Noordman Autoservice/ProX Racing Parts	KTM	103	(Netherlands) Tara Noordman	6
Morbihan-moto	KTM	104	(France) Eloane Burban	3
Husqvarna Motorcycles Scandinavia	Husqvarna	126	(Sweden) Matilda Huss	4
Ausió Racing Team	Yamaha	128	(Spain) Jana Sánchez	1, 3, 5
Turci Racing Team KTM	KTM	136	(Italy) Chantal Pavoni	5
PFP Racing	Honda	153	(France) April Franzoni	All
Schmicker Racing	KTM	172	(Netherlands) Lynn Valk	All
MCR Racing Team	Husqvarna	174	(Italy) Giorgia Giudici	5
	KTM	176	(Zambia) Leah Heygate	4
Team JPR	Yamaha	203	(France) Camille Viaud	6
UK Racing Team	KTM	212	(Spain) Aitana Peña	3
MX Racing France	Yamaha	220	(France) Mélanie Perez	1–3
JK Racing Yamaha	Yamaha	228	(Romania) Aida Cojanu	7
Schrems Racing Parts	Fantic	237	(Germany) Celine Abel	4
RFME WMX Team	Gas Gas	255	(Spain) Daniela Guillén	All
Motorrad Knobloch / TYK Racing	Yamaha	257	(Germany) Lexi Pachmann	All
AVT Campers	KTM	310	(United Kingdom) Lucy Barker	All
Flexbox Racing	KTM	325	(Denmark) Sara Andersen	All
	Honda	360	(Germany) Tabea Zimmermann	4, 6
De Baets Yamaha MX Team	Yamaha	401	(Netherlands) Lotte van Drunen	All
	Gas Gas	425	(Netherlands) Amber Simons	2, 6
	Gas Gas	433	(Netherlands) Lynn Snoek	6
MB Motocross Team	Yamaha	442	(Norway) Rosalita Hovind	6
	Kawasaki	511	(Norway) Martine Hughes	1–2, 6–7
	Yamaha	524	(Belgium) Elise De Baere	6
	Yamaha	543	(Belgium) Maxime Breugelmans	6
MC Sport Racing Team	Gas Gas	587	(Sweden) Tyra Backström	2, 4, 6
	Yamaha	612	(Norway) Mathea Selebø	All
	Husqvarna	613	(Hungary) Lora Tamás	4
	Yamaha	644	(Denmark) Laura Raunkjær	1, 3–7
	Gas Gas	699	(Austria) Elena Kapsamer	All
KTM Scandinavia	KTM	705	(Denmark) Malou Jakobsen	All
	Kawasaki	714	(Germany) Sandra Weny	4
Ceres 71 Yamaha Team	Yamaha	717	(Netherlands) Danée Gelissen	All
	Kawasaki	774	(Germany) Gina-Marie Piepke	4
	KTM	775	(Germany) Alexandra Massury	All
Ramudden Sverige/Yamaha Scandinavia	Yamaha	841	(Sweden) Nellie Fransson	6
Ricky MX Store 636	Yamaha	872	(Italy) Francesca Mercante	5
	Yamaha	914	(Spain) Carmen Gómez	1, 3
Twenty Suspension	Husqvarna	969	(Germany) Fiona Hoppe	All
KL Motors	Honda	974	(Germany) Janina Lehmann	All

Points are awarded to finishers of the main races, in the following format:

Position	1st	2nd	3rd	4th	5th	6th	7th	8th	9th	10th	11th	12th	13th	14th	15th	16th	17th	18th	19th	20th
Points	25	22	20	18	16	15	14	13	12	11	10	9	8	7	6	5	4	3	2	1

== Riders Championship ==
Pos	Rider	Bike	ESP (Spain)		SAR (Sardinia)		GAL		GER (Germany)		ITA (Italy)		NED (Netherlands)		TUR (Turkey)		Points
1	(Netherlands) Lotte van Drunen	Yamaha	2	2	1	1	2	1	3	2	C	6	1	1	4	5	282
2	(Spain) Daniela Guillén	Gas Gas	1	1	2	2	4	3	1	4	C	3	5	3	2	1	278
3	(Italy) Kiara Fontanesi	Gas Gas	5	5	4	4	3	4	2	8	C	2	7	6	3	3	232
4	(Netherlands) Lynn Valk	KTM	4	4	3	3	8	5	5	3	C	1	3	4	Ret	6	219
5	(New Zealand) Courtney Duncan	Kawasaki	3	19	5	5	1	2			C	14	2	2	1	2	199
6	(Germany) Larissa Papenmeier	Honda	8	6	9	10	5	9	4	1	C	5	8	8	6	7	193
7	(Denmark) Sara Andersen	KTM	7	3	6	7	6	6	7	5	C	16	4	5	8	16	180
8	(Netherlands) Danée Gelissen	Yamaha	16	9	Ret	12	11	8	10	6	C	4	11	7	9	8	142
9	(Denmark) Malou Jakobsen	KTM	9	8	13	9	10	10	6	9	C	19	9	9	10	12	140
10	(France) April Franzoni	Honda	11	11	16	16	9	11	8	7	C	Ret	13	14	11	10	115
11	(Norway) Mathea Selebø	Yamaha	17	15	17	15	13	12	11	13	C	11	16	13	12	9	99
12	(Netherlands) Shana van der Vlist	Yamaha	10	12	7	6	7	7	9	Ret							89
13	(Norway) Martine Hughes	Kawasaki	6	7	8	8							12	30	7	11	88
14	(United Kingdom) Lucy Barker	KTM	12	14	14	11	14	15	15	10	C	Ret	19	22	13	14	80
15	(Germany) Alexandra Massury	KTM	13	13	18	23	21	14	12	12	C	9	22	19	17	13	70
16	(Germany) Fiona Hoppe	Husqvarna	18	17	11	18	15	23	13	17	C	18	23	17	Ret	15	51
17	(Denmark) Laura Raunkjær	Yamaha	19	20			16	17	18	16	C	12	18	18	15	18	44
18	(Sweden) Tyra Backström	Gas Gas			10	14			16	19			14	12			41
19	(Belgium) Amandine Verstappen	Yamaha									C	8	10	10			35
20	(Australia) Charli Cannon	Honda													5	4	34
21	(Spain) Jana Sánchez	Yamaha	15	10			12	13			C	DNS					34
22	(Netherlands) Britt Jans-Beken	Yamaha	Ret	DNS	15	13							15	11			30
23	(Austria) Elena Kapsamer	Gas Gas	20	16	19	20	Ret	DNS	35	Ret	C	10	24	28	14	Ret	27
24	(Germany) Janina Lehmann	Honda	21	21	21	22	19	16	17	29	C	17	Ret	23	16	17	24
25	(Netherlands) Amber Simons	Gas Gas			12	19							17	16			20
26	(Sweden) Mathilda Huss	Husqvarna							14	11							17
27	(Netherlands) Nancy van de Ven	Yamaha											6	Ret			15
28	(France) Mathilde Martinez	Gas Gas	14	18	20	17											15
29	(Italy) Giorgia Montini	Honda									C	7					14
30	(Germany) Alicia Reitze	Yamaha					17	19	19	20							9
31	(Italy) Emanuela Talucci	KTM			23	24			22	Ret	C	13	28	26			8
32	(Zambia) Leah Heygate	KTM							20	14							8
33	(Sweden) Nellie Fransson	Yamaha											20	15			7
34	(Italy) Gaia Franchi	Honda			27	28			27	21	C	15					6
35	(Poland) Wiktoria Kupczyk	KTM							28	15							6
36	(Switzerland) Virginie Germond	KTM	Ret	DNS	Ret	25	18	18	DNS	DNS							6
37	(Colombia) Alicia Göggel	Gas Gas	23	27	26	26	24	21	32	18	C	20	32	33	21	21	4
38	(Romania) Aida Cojanu	Yamaha													18	20	4
39	(Czech Republic) Aneta Čepeláková	Yamaha	24	22	24	29			Ret	25	C	23			19	19	4
40	(Spain) Aitana Peña	KTM					20	20									2
41	(Denmark) Barbara Aagaard Andersen	Yamaha	22	23	22	21					C	Ret	21	20			1
42	(Italy) Cecilia Polato	Gas Gas							31	30	C	Ret			20	Ret	1
	(Norway) Rosalita Hovind	Yamaha											27	21			0
	(Germany) Kim Irmgartz	Honda							21	Ret							0
	(France) Lea Chaput	Yamaha									C	21					0
	(Germany) Lexi Pachmann	Yamaha	Ret	25	25	27	22	22	26	22	C	Ret	36	34	22	22	0
	(Italy) Priska Busatto	KTM									C	22	35	35			0
	(Spain) Carmen Gómez	Yamaha	25	24			23	24									0
	(Sweden) Sanna Kjellberg	Yamaha							25	23							0
	(Germany) Sandra Weny	Kawasaki							23	28							0
	(Iran) Hasti Rezaei	Yamaha													23	Ret	0
	(France) Camille Viaud	Yamaha											25	24			0
	(Germany) Katharina Schultz	Kawasaki							24	Ret			26	29			0
	(Germany) Emely Köhler	KTM							30	24	C	Ret	30	32			0
	(Turkey) Selen Tınaz	Yamaha													24	DNS	0
	(France) Mélanie Perez	Yamaha	26	26	28	DNS	25	Ret									0
	(France) Eloane Burban	KTM					26	25									0
	(Netherlands) Maureen Zweers	Yamaha											34	25			0
	(Turkey) Irmak Yıldırım	Gas Gas													25	Ret	0
	(Germany) Gina-Marie Piepke	Kawasaki							36	26							0
	(Belgium) Maxime Breugelmans	Yamaha											29	27			0
	(Germany) Tabea Zimmermann	Honda							37	27			37	36			0
	(Germany) Celine Abel	Kawasaki							29	Ret							0
	(Netherlands) Lynn Snoek	Gas Gas											31	31			0
	(Germany) Johanna Neusüß	Kawasaki							34	31							0
	(Germany) Gianna Sturzeck	Husqvarna							38	32							0
	(Hungary) Lora Tamás	Husqvarna							33	Ret							0
	(Netherlands) Tara Noordman	KTM											33	Ret			0
	(Belgium) Elise De Baere	Yamaha											38	37			0
	(Italy) Francesca Mercante	Yamaha									C	Ret					0
	(Italy) Chantal Pavoni	KTM									C	Ret					0
	(Italy) Giorgia Giudici	Husqvarna									C	Ret					0
	(Germany) Emely Heleenders	Yamaha	DNS	DNS													0
Pos	Rider	Bike	ESP (Spain)		SAR (Sardinia)		GAL		GER (Germany)		ITA (Italy)		NED (Netherlands)		TUR (Turkey)		Points

== Manufacturers Championship ==
Pos	Bike	ESP (Spain)		SAR (Sardinia)		GAL		GER (Germany)		ITA (Italy)		NED (Netherlands)		TUR (Turkey)		Points
1	Yamaha	2	2	1	1	2	1	3	2	C	4	1	1	4	5	285
2	Gas Gas	1	1	2	2	3	3	1	4	C	2	5	3	2	1	282
3	KTM	4	3	3	3	6	5	5	3	C	1	3	4	8	6	236
4	Kawasaki	3	7	5	5	1	2	23	26	C	14	2	2	1	2	211
5	Honda	8	6	9	10	5	9	4	1	C	5	8	8	5	4	198
6	Husqvarna	18	17	11	18	15	23	13	11	C	18	23	17	Ret	15	57
Pos	Bike	ESP (Spain)		SAR (Sardinia)		GAL		GER (Germany)		ITA (Italy)		NED (Netherlands)		TUR (Turkey)		Points
