= 2022 FIM Women's Motocross World Championship =

18th Women's Motocross World Championship season

The 2022 FIM Women's Motocross World Championship is the 18th Women's Motocross World Championship season. Courtney Duncan is the defending champion, after taking her third title in 2021 and Kawasaki is the defending Manufacturing champion.

== 2022 Calendar ==
A 6-round calendar for the 2022 season was announced on 17 November 2021.

Round	Date	Grand Prix	Location	Race 1 Winner	Race 2 Winner	Round Winner	Report
1	March 6	(Lombardy) Lombardia	Mantova	(Netherlands) Lynn Valk	(Netherlands) Nancy van de Ven	(Netherlands) Nancy van de Ven	
2	April 3	Portugal	Águeda	(Netherlands) Lynn Valk	(Netherlands) Lynn Valk	(Netherlands) Lynn Valk	
3	May 15	Sardinia	Riola Sardo	(Netherlands) Shana van der Vlist	(Netherlands) Nancy van de Ven	(Netherlands) Shana van der Vlist	
4	May 29	Spain	intu Xanadu	(New Zealand) Courtney Duncan	(Spain) Daniela Guillén	(New Zealand) Courtney Duncan	
5	September 4	Turkey	Afyonkarahisar	(New Zealand) Courtney Duncan	(New Zealand) Courtney Duncan	(New Zealand) Courtney Duncan	

== Participants ==
Team	Constructor	No	Rider	Rounds
Big Van World MTX Kawasaki	Kawasaki	1	(New Zealand) Courtney Duncan	1–2, 4–5
Millionaire Racing Team	Husqvarna	4	(Italy) Gaia Franchi	1–3
Millionaire Racing Team	Husqvarna	28	(Italy) Elisa Galvagno	1–3, 5
Lakerveld Racing	KTM	5	(Netherlands) Britt Jans-Beken	All
M.B.T. Motorbike Racing Team	Husqvarna	7	(Italy) Giorgia Montini	1
Team Dragon Moto	KTM	9	(Switzerland) Virginie Germond	All
	Gas Gas	11	(Croatia) Mia Ribić	1
Yamaha Racing 423	Yamaha	12	(Germany) Alicia Reitze	2–4
Yamaha Racing 423	Yamaha	423	(Germany) Larissa Papenmeier	All
JK Racing Yamaha	Yamaha	17	(Australia) Charli Cannon	5
JK Racing Yamaha	Yamaha	172	(Netherlands) Lynn Valk	All
	Honda	20	(Iran) Hasti Rezaei	5
Team FR25	Gas Gas	24	(France) Lea Chaput	3
Yamaha Čepelák Racing Team	Yamaha	26	(Czech Republic) Aneta Čepeláková	1
	Yamaha	29	(Canada) Alissa Harkin	2–5
Vermeeren Honda Racing	Honda	36	(United States) Avrie Berry	3
Team RC Racing	Honda	47	(Italy) Gaia Oddo	1
Beurspro	KTM	51	(Netherlands) Jenitty Van der Beek	2, 5
Motorrad Waldmann	Honda	55	(Germany) Kim Irmgartz	1
	KTM	71	(Netherlands) Demi Verploegh	1–2
Top Cross TCS Racing Team	Yamaha	74	(Romania) Aida Cojanu	5
RFME WMX Team	KTM	79	(Spain) Gabriela Seisdedos	3–5
RFME WMX Team	KTM	255	(Spain) Daniela Guillén	1, 3–4
Ceres 71 Racing	Yamaha	85	(Netherlands) Nancy van de Ven	All
Ceres 71 Racing	Yamaha	912	(Italy) Giorgia Blasigh	All
Xdecor	Kawasaki	86	(Switzerland) Ramona Gassmann	5
IZZ Global/Fenermekanik	Gas Gas	88	(Turkey) Irmak Yıldırım	5
SK Racing	Yamaha	90	(Switzerland) Sandra Keller	All
MX Fonta Racing Syneco	Gas Gas	94	(Italy) Priska Busatto	1
GripMesser Racing Team	Fantic	111	(Germany) Anne Borchers	1–2
	KTM	124	(Austria) Alina Barthel	1
	KTM	125	(Netherlands) Amber Simons	1–2
	Husqvarna	136	(Italy) Chantal Pavoni	1
Yamaha Scandinavia	Yamaha	153	(Denmark) Barbara Aagaard Andersen	3
MCR Racing Team	Husqvarna	174	(Italy) Giorgia Giudici	1
Honda Racing New Zealand	Honda	179	(New Zealand) Roma Edwards	4
KTM Brouwer Motors	KTM	188	(Netherlands) Shana van der Vlist	All
Ausio Racing Team	Yamaha	246	(Spain) Jana Sánchez	4
9MM Energy Drink BUD Racing Kawasaki	Kawasaki	274	(Belgium) Amandine Verstappen	All
	Yamaha	299	(Poland) Karolina Jasińska	1
Flex-Box Racing	KTM	325	(Denmark) Sara Andersen	All
	KTM	401	(Netherlands) Lotte Van Drunen	5
Team Made Of Gas Gas	Gas Gas	412	(Italy) Matilde Stilo	1
Honda 114 Motorsports	Honda	511	(Norway) Martine Hughes	All
Honda 114 Motorsports	Honda	625	(Australia) Tahlia Jade O'Hare	All
Chase Racing MX Team	Gas Gas	512	(Germany) Julia Blatter	1
Motocrosscenter	Husqvarna	585	(Spain) Mariona Valero	4
Team NRT	Honda	611	(Spain) Natalia Rosado	4
	Yamaha	612	(Norway) Mathea Selebø	1–4
	Yamaha	644	(Denmark) Laura Raunkjær	1
KTM Scandinavia	KTM	705	(Denmark) Malou Jakobsen	All
	KTM	717	(Netherlands) Danée Gelissen	1, 3–5
BvZ Racing Team	Gas Gas	969	(Germany) Fiona Hoppe	1, 3–4
Honda RedMoto	Honda	937	(Italy) Erica Lago	3
KMP Honda Racing	Honda	974	(Germany) Janina Lehmann	1–2

Points are awarded to finishers of the main races, in the following format:

Position	1st	2nd	3rd	4th	5th	6th	7th	8th	9th	10th	11th	12th	13th	14th	15th	16th	17th	18th	19th	20th
Points	25	22	20	18	16	15	14	13	12	11	10	9	8	7	6	5	4	3	2	1

== Riders Championship ==
Pos	Rider	Bike	LOM (Lombardy)		POR (Portugal)		SAR (Sardinia)		ESP (Spain)		TUR (Turkey)		Points
1	(Netherlands) Nancy van de Ven	Yamaha	2	1	2	2	6	1	2	3	6	8	201
2	(Netherlands) Lynn Valk	Yamaha	1	2	1	1	2	Ret	8	5	3	6	183
3	(Germany) Larissa Papenmeier	Yamaha	11	6	3	4	4	6	4	4	2	4	172
4	(Netherlands) Shana van der Vlist	KTM	6	4	6	3	1	2	9	13	10	2	168
5	(Denmark) Sara Andersen	KTM	9	7	4	20	8	9	6	6	4	3	138
6	(Belgium) Amandine Verstappen	Kawasaki	4	5	7	6	5	Ret	12	7	5	5	134
7	(New Zealand) Courtney Duncan	Kawasaki	3	9	DNS	DNS			1	2	1	1	129
8	(Norway) Martine Hughes	Honda	5	3	5	Ret	10	4	11	17	9	14	114
9	(Italy) Giorgia Blasigh	Yamaha	7	14	10	8	11	8	5	9	16	12	110
10	(Australia) Tahlia Jade O'Hare	Honda	12	13	12	5	24	7	7	8	13	10	102
11	(Denmark) Malou Jakobsen	KTM	8	11	9	7	13	Ret	13	10	11	11	96
12	(Netherlands) Britt Jans-Beken	KTM	16	12	8	18	7	5	14	15	12	16	87
13	(Spain) Daniela Guillén	KTM	DNS	DNS			3	3	3	1			85
14	(Norway) Mathea Selebø	Yamaha	18	10	16	10	9	11	10	12			72
15	(Switzerland) Virginie Germond	KTM	14	18	17	11	15	15	18	18	17	13	54
16	(Switzerland) Sandra Keller	Yamaha	20	Ret	15	9	12	12	16	16	15	Ret	53
17	(Spain) Gabriela Seisdedos	KTM					17	13	17	11	14	15	39
18	(Germany) Anne Borchers	Fantic	10	16	11	12							35
19	(Italy) Elisa Galvagno	Husqvarna	DNS	8	13	DNS	DNS	DNS			Ret	9	33
20	(Netherlands) Danée Gelissen	KTM	17	Ret			14	10	19	20	19	19	29
21	(Germany) Alicia Reitze	Yamaha			14	13	19	17	15	19			29
22	(Netherlands) Lotte Van Drunen	KTM									7	7	28
23	(Germany) Kim Irmgartz	Honda	13	15									14
24	(Netherlands) Jenitty Van der Beek	KTM			20	15					18	17	14
25	(Australia) Charli Cannon	Yamaha									8	Ret	13
26	(United States) Avrie Berry	Honda					16	14					12
27	(Italy) Giorgia Montini	Husqvarna	15	17									10
28	(Germany) Janina Lehmann	Honda	Ret	DNS	18	16							8
29	(Netherlands) Amber Simons	KTM	24	22	Ret	14							7
30	(Spain) Jana Sánchez	Yamaha							24	14			7
31	(Italy) Gaia Franchi	Husqvarna	22	27	19	17	22	20					7
32	(Denmark) Barbara Aagaard Andersen	Yamaha					20	16					6
33	(Germany) Fiona Hoppe	Gas Gas	26	24			18	18	21	22			6
34	(Romania) Aida Cojanu	Yamaha									20	18	4
35	(Canada) Alissa Harkin	Yamaha			21	19	25	22	25	25	23	22	2
36	(France) Lea Chaput	Gas Gas					21	19					2
37	(Italy) Giorgia Giudici	Husqvarna	21	19									2
38	(Denmark) Laura Raunkjær	Yamaha	19	21									2
39	(Iran) Hasti Rezaei	Honda									21	20	1
40	(New Zealand) Roma Edwards	Honda							20	21			1
41	(Croatia) Mia Ribić	Gas Gas	25	20									1
	(Switzerland) Ramona Gassmann	Kawasaki									22	21	0
	(Italy) Erica Lago	Honda					23	21					0
	(Spain) Natalia Rosado	Honda							22	23			0
	(Spain) Mariona Valero	Husqvarna							23	24			0
	(Turkey) Irmak Yıldırım	Gas Gas									24	23	0
	(Netherlands) Demi Verploegh	Husqvarna	27	23	DNS	DNS							0
	(Czech Republic) Aneta Čepeláková	Yamaha	23	32									0
	(Italy) Priska Busatto	Gas Gas	28	25									0
	(Italy) Matilde Stilo	Gas Gas	29	26									0
	(Germany) Julia Blatter	Gas Gas	Ret	28									0
	(Italy) Chantal Pavoni	Husqvarna	32	29									0
	(Austria) Alina Barthel	KTM	30	Ret									0
	(Italy) Gaia Oddo	Honda	Ret	30									0
	(Poland) Karolina Jasińska	Yamaha	31	31									0
Pos	Rider	Bike	LOM (Lombardy)		POR (Portugal)		SAR (Sardinia)		ESP (Spain)		TUR (Turkey)		Points

== Manufacturers Championship ==
Pos	Bike	LOM (Lombardy)		POR (Portugal)		SAR (Sardinia)		ESP (Spain)		TUR (Turkey)		Points
1	Yamaha	1	1	1	1	2	1	2	3	2	4	229
2	KTM	6	4	4	3	1	2	3	1	4	2	203
3	Kawasaki	3	5	7	6	5	Ret	1	2	1	1	178
4	Honda	5	3	5	5	10	4	7	8	9	10	147
5	Husqvarna	15	8	13	17	22	20	23	24	Ret	9	44
6	Fantic	10	16	11	12							35
7	Gas Gas	25	20			18	18	21	22	24	23	7
Pos	Bike	LOM (Lombardy)		POR (Portugal)		SAR (Sardinia)		ESP (Spain)		TUR (Turkey)		Points
