= 2025 FIM Women's Motocross World Championship =

The 2025 FIM Women's Motocross World Championship was the 21st Women's Motocross World Championship season. Lotte van Drunen was the defending champion, after taking her first title in 2024 and Yamaha is the defending Manufacturing champion.

At the conclusion of the championship, van Drunen was able to successfully defend her title.

== 2025 Calendar ==
A 6-round calendar for the 2025 season was announced on 10 October 2024.

Round	Date	Grand Prix	Location	Race 1 Winner	Race 2 Winner	Round Winner	Report
1	5-6 April	Sardinia	Riola Sardo	(Netherlands) Lotte van Drunen	(Netherlands) Lotte van Drunen	(Netherlands) Lotte van Drunen	
2	10-11 May	Spain	Lugo	(Spain) Daniela Guillén	(Italy) Kiara Fontanesi	(Italy) Kiara Fontanesi	
3	31 May & 1 June	Germany	Teutschenthal	(Italy) Kiara Fontanesi	(Netherlands) Lotte van Drunen	(Italy) Kiara Fontanesi	
4	23-24 August	Netherlands	Arnhem	(Netherlands) Lotte van Drunen	(Spain) Daniela Guillén	(Spain) Daniela Guillén	
5	6-7 September	Turkey	Afyonkarahisar	(Spain) Daniela Guillén	(Italy) Kiara Fontanesi	(Italy) Kiara Fontanesi	
6	20-21 September	Australia	Darwin	(Italy) Kiara Fontanesi	(Spain) Daniela Guillén	(Spain) Daniela Guillén	

== Participants ==
Team	Constructor	No	Rider	Rounds
GF4 Motorsport Racing Team	Honda	4	(Italy) Gaia Franchi	1-3
Newcastle Powersports	KTM	5	(Australia) Sienna Giudice	6
Six Motorsport	Honda	6	(Italy) Giorgia Montini	1
Honda Racing Australia	Honda	7	(Australia) Charli Cannon	6
Honda Racing Australia	Honda	117	(Australia) Mia Tongue	6
MX Fonta Racing Syneco	Gas Gas	8	(Italy) Kiara Fontanesi	1-6
Team Dragon Moto	KTM	9	(Switzerland) Virginie Germond	1-3
Penrite Racing Empire Kawasaki	Kawasaki	10	(Australia) Taylah McCutcheon	6
KG MX Team	KTM	11	(Norway) Jenny Engeland	3
	Yamaha	14	(Germany) Lisa Bartling	3
KTM-Shop24.de	KTM	17	(Germany) Emely Köhler	3
Zweiradsport Brunner	Yamaha	18	(Germany) Katharina Schultz	3-4
ADAC Sachsen Motorsport	Triumph	20	(Germany) Tanja Schlosser	3
	KTM	22	(Australia) Madison Healey	6
VENUM BUD Racing Kawasaki	Kawasaki	24	(France) Lea Chaput	1-3
Yamaha Čepelák Racing	Yamaha	26	(Czech Republic) Aneta Čepeláková	1-6
Yamaha Motor Scandinavia	Yamaha	28	(Denmark) Nicoline Sørensen	4
	Kawasaki	31	(Germany) Johanna Neusüß	3
DDC Racing Team	Yamaha	34	(Italy) Emanuela Talucci	1-3
MB Motocross Team	Yamaha	40	(Norway) Rosalita Hovind	4
KTM Australia	KTM	43	(Australia) Darci Whalley	6
KTM Australia	KTM	161	(Australia) Taylor Thompson	6
Cat Moto Bauerschmidt Husqvarna	Husqvarna	49	(Colombia) Alicia Göggel	1-2, 4
Kawasaki España	Kawasaki	50	(Spain) Anna González	2
NR-Service Racing Team	Gas Gas	53	(Denmark) Barbara Aagaard Andersen	1-5
Motorrad Waldmann	Honda	55	(Germany) Kim Irmgartz	3
	Gas Gas	56	(Australia) Emily Lambert	6
Bunbury KTM	KTM	62	(Australia) Leah Rimbas	6
Monster Energy WBR Yamaha	Yamaha	63	(Australia) Madi Simpson	6
	Gas Gas	78	(Sweden) Elsa Andersson Löf	1, 3-4
Triumph Aqva Racing	Triumph	79	(Poland) Wiktoria Kupczyk	1-4
	Gas Gas	80	(Italy) Cecilia Polato	5
ZAH Motorcycle Racing	Honda	82	(Germany) Carina Prevoo	3
Enduro Koch Racing	Husqvarna	89	(Germany) Gianna Sturzeck	3
	Kawasaki	99	(Netherlands) Suzy Tausch	1, 3
	KTM	103	(Netherlands) Tara Noordman	4
FiveThreeSeven	KTM	110	(Netherlands) Zoe Cobussen	4
Team Moto Canberra	Husqvarna	111	(Australia) Samantha MacArthur	6
	Honda	115	(Germany) Mirja Kück	3
WZ Racing Team	KTM	118	(Lithuania) Adrija Skudutytė	1-5
Seven Seven Six Racing Team	Honda	127	(Germany) Pauline Sczeponek	3
Mequitec Gas Gas Racing Team	Gas Gas	128	(Spain) Jana Sánchez	1-5
Mequitec Gas Gas Racing Team	Gas Gas	255	(Spain) Daniela Guillén	1-6
Team JS Racing	Honda	137	(France) Lisa Guerber	3
	Honda	144	(Germany) Paula Kriegenhofer	3
Team Honda Motoblouz SR Motul	Honda	153	(France) April Franzoni	1-5
Van Venrooy KTM Racing	KTM	172	(Netherlands) Lynn Valk	1-4
Van de Laar Racing	Yamaha	188	(Netherlands) Shana van der Vlist	1-5
	Gas Gas	199	(Germany) Tarja Kück	3-4
MB Motors	Husqvarna	211	(Austria) Jana Bohle	3
Larry Bikes	Honda	218	(Spain) Cristina de Juan	2
Larry Bikes	Honda	611	(Spain) Natalia Rosado	2
Enduro Istanbul	GasGas	220	(Turkey) Selen Tınaz	5
Motorrad Waldmann	KTM	237	(Germany) Mara Benecke	1, 3-4
	KTM	238	(Belgium) Nanou Vangenechten	4
KTM Sarholz Racing Team	KTM	257	(Germany) Lexi Pachmann	1, 3
Team New Bike Yamaha	Yamaha	274	(Belgium) Amandine Verstappen	1-6
AVT Campers	KTM	310	(United Kingdom) Lucy Barker	1-5
Wozniak MX Racing Team	Yamaha	325	(Denmark) Sara Andersen	1-2, 4
	Honda	360	(Germany) Tabea Zimmermann	3
De Baets Yamaha MX Team	Yamaha	401	(Netherlands) Lotte van Drunen	1-6
De Baets Yamaha MX Team	Yamaha	717	(Netherlands) Danée Gelissen	1-5
SYE Racing Team 423	Honda	423	(Germany) Larissa Papenmeier	1-6
SYE Racing Team 423	Honda	644	(Denmark) Laura Raunkjær	2-5
	Triumph	425	(Netherlands) Amber Simons	1-4
Snoek Motoren	Gas Gas	433	(Netherlands) Lynn Snoek	4
Team XLR	Triumph	486	(Australia) Felicity Shrimpton	6
	Kawasaki	511	(Norway) Martine Hughes	1-5
MX Training Days by Michaël Das	KTM	526	(Netherlands) Kyshara Das	4
	Yamaha	543	(Belgium) Maxime Breugelmans	4
MC Sport Racing Team	Gas Gas	587	(Sweden) Tyra Backström	1-5
	Yamaha	612	(Norway) Mathea Selebø	1-5
	Gas Gas	699	(Austria) Elena Kapsamer	1-4
KL Racing Team	KTM	705	(Denmark) Malou Jakobsen	1-5
	KTM	775	(Germany) Alexandra Massury	1-6
JK Racing Yamaha	Yamaha	841	(Sweden) Nellie Fransson	1, 3, 5-6
	Yamaha	914	(Spain) Carmen Gómez	2
	Gas Gas	939	(Germany) Bibi Finnja Bestmann	3-4
Dörr Motorsport Triumph Racing	Triumph	969	(Germany) Fiona Hoppe	1-4

Points are awarded to finishers of the main races, in the following format:

Position	1st	2nd	3rd	4th	5th	6th	7th	8th	9th	10th	11th	12th	13th	14th	15th	16th	17th	18th	19th	20th
Points	25	22	20	18	16	15	14	13	12	11	10	9	8	7	6	5	4	3	2	1

== Riders Championship ==
Pos	Rider	Bike	SAR (Sardinia)		ESP (Spain)		GER (Germany)		NED (Netherlands)		TUR (Turkey)		AUS (Australia)		Points
1	(Netherlands) Lotte van Drunen	Yamaha	1	1	5	2	3	1	1	2	3	4	3	4	256
2	(Italy) Kiara Fontanesi	Gas Gas	4	6	2	1	1	2	4	6	2	1	1	2	249
3	(Spain) Daniela Guillén	Gas Gas	10	5	1	3	2	4	2	1	1	2	2	1	248
4	(Germany) Larissa Papenmeier	Honda	8	10	8	6	5	5	7	11	8	5	5	5	169
5	(Belgium) Amandine Verstappen	Yamaha	7	8	4	11	6	6	9	10	5	9	4	8	167
6	(Netherlands) Shana van der Vlist	Yamaha	3	2	18	5	8	12	3	3	10	8			147
7	(Norway) Martine Hughes	Kawasaki	6	7	12	10	11	9	11	7	4	3			133
8	(Netherlands) Danée Gelissen	Yamaha	9	9	9	7	10	8	5	5	12	7			129
9	(Netherlands) Lynn Valk	KTM	2	3	3	4	4	3	Ret	DNS					118
10	(France) April Franzoni	Honda	16	11	7	8	9	7	10	8	7	Ret			106
11	(United Kingdom) Lucy Barker	KTM	18	18	10	9	26	10	6	4	6	6			103
12	(Denmark) Malou Jakobsen	KTM	12	14	6	13	7	16	15	31	9	10			87
13	(Norway) Mathea Selebø	Yamaha	15	12	11	14	13	11	12	Ret	11	12			78
14	(Sweden) Tyra Bäckström	Gas Gas	11	15	15	12	12	23	13	12	14	11			74
15	(Denmark) Sara Andersen	Yamaha	5	4	19	DNS			8	9					61
16	(Germany) Alexandra Massury	KTM	22	22	13	21	14	17	18	18	13	18	12	10	56
17	(Sweden) Nellie Fransson	Yamaha	Ret	DNS			18	13			15	13	10	15	42
18	(Australia) Charli Cannon	Honda											7	3	34
19	(Netherlands) Amber Simons	Triumph	13	13	26	16	DNQ	DNQ	14	17					32
20	(Austria) Elena Kapsamer	Gas Gas	21	17	21	25	17	14	16	13					28
21	(Spain) Jana Sánchez	Gas Gas	24	23	14	18	16	18	25	Ret	18	14			28
22	(Denmark) Laura Raunkjær	Honda			17	22	19	20	17	16	17	15			26
23	(Australia) Madi Simpson	Yamaha											8	9	25
24	(Australia) Leah Rimbas	KTM											13	7	22
25	(Australia) Madison Healey	KTM											9	11	22
26	(Lithuania) Adrija Skudutytė	KTM	19	21	20	15	24	15	24	22	16	19			22
27	(Germany) Fiona Hoppe	Triumph	14	16	23	20	22	Ret	19	15					21
28	(Czech Republic) Aneta Čepeláková	Yamaha	26	27	25	19	Ret	28	Ret	DNS	19	17	15	14	21
29	(Australia) Taylor Thompson	KTM											16	6	20
30	(Australia) Taylah McCutcheon	Kawasaki											6	20	16
31	(Australia) Darci Whalley	KTM											11	16	15
32	(Australia) Mia Tongue	Honda											14	13	15
33	(Australia) Emily Lambert	Gas Gas											17	12	13
34	(Sweden) Elsa Andersson Löf	Gas Gas	20	20			21	27	26	14					9
35	(Australia) Felicity Shrimpton	Triumph											18	17	7
36	(Germany) Tanja Schlosser	Triumph					15	Ret							6
37	(Denmark) Barbara Aagaard	Gas Gas	25	Ret	22	24	31	26	30	21	20	16			6
38	(Italy) Giorgia Montini	Honda	17	19											6
39	(Germany) Mara Benecke	KTM	23	24			20	19	20	19					6
40	(Switzerland) Virginie Germond	KTM	34	33	16	23	32	21							5
41	(Italy) Gaia Franchi	Honda	28	26	24	17	23	22							4
42	(Australia) Sienna Giudice	KTM											20	18	4
43	(Australia) Samantha MacArthur	Husqvarna											19	19	4
44	(Italy) Cecilia Polato	Gas Gas									21	20			1
45	(Norway) Rosalita Hovind	Yamaha							23	20					1
	(Turkey) Selen Tınaz	Gas Gas									22	21			0
	(Netherlands) Kyshara Das	KTM							21	Ret					0
	(Germany) Katharina Schultz	Yamaha					28	31	22	23					0
	(Denmark) Nicoline Sørensen	Yamaha							28	24					0
	(Germany) Kim Irmgartz	Honda					29	24							0
	(Poland) Wiktoria Kupczyk	Triumph	29	25	32	28	35	30	27	Ret					0
	(Italy) Emanuela Talucci	Yamaha	33	31	28	29	30	25							0
	(Belgium) Maxime Breugelmans	Yamaha							29	25					0
	(France) Lisa Guerber	Honda					25	34							0
	(Colombia) Alicia Göggel	Husqvarna	31	29	29	26			Ret	DNS					0
	(Belgium) Nanou Vangenechten	KTM							35	26					0
	(Netherlands) Suzy Tausch	Kawasaki	27	28			33	38							0
	(Norway) Jenny Engeland	KTM					27	29							0
	(France) Lea Chaput	Kawasaki	32	32	31	27	34	33							0
	(Spain) Carmen Gómez	Yamaha			27	31									0
	(Netherlands) Zoe Cobussen	KTM							34	27					0
	(Netherlands) Lynn Snoek	Gas Gas							33	28					0
	(Germany) Bibi Finnja Bestmann	Gas Gas					DNQ	DNQ	36	29					0
	(Germany) Lexi Pachmann	KTM	30	30			37	35							0
	(Spain) Natalia Rosada	Honda			30	30									0
	(Netherlands) Tara Noordman	KTM							32	30					0
	(Germany) Tarja Kück	Gas Gas					Ret	37	31	32					0
	(Spain) Cristina de Juan	Honda			34	32									0
	(Austria) Jana Bohle	Husqvarna					36	32							0
	(Spain) Anna González	Kawasaki			33	33									0
	(Germany) Emely Köhler	KTM					38	36							0
	(Germany) Pauline Sczeponek	Gas Gas					DNQ	DNQ							0
	(Germany) Lisa Bartling	Yamaha					DNQ	DNQ							0
	(Germany) Paula Kriegenhofer	Honda					DNQ	DNQ							0
	(Germany) Gianna Sturzeck	Husqvarna					DNQ	DNQ							0
	(Germany) Johanna Neusüß	Kawasaki					DNQ	DNQ							0
	(Germany) Mirja Kück	Honda					DNQ	DNQ							0
	(Germany) Tabea Zimmermann	Honda					DNQ	DNQ							0
	(Germany) Carina Prevoo	Honda					DNQ	DNQ							0
Pos	Rider	Bike	SAR (Sardinia)		ESP (Spain)		GER (Germany)		NED (Netherlands)		TUR (Turkey)		AUS (Australia)		Points

== Manufacturers Championship ==
Pos	Bike	SAR (Sardinia)		ESP (Spain)		GER (Germany)		NED (Netherlands)		TUR (Turkey)		AUS (Australia)		Points
1	Gas Gas	4	5	1	1	1	2	2	1	1	1	1	1	278
2	Yamaha	1	1	4	2	3	1	1	2	3	4	3	4	258
3	KTM	2	3	3	4	4	3	6	4	6	6	9	6	208
4	Honda	8	10	7	6	5	5	7	8	7	5	5	3	178
5	Kawasaki	6	7	12	10	11	9	11	7	4	3	6	20	149
6	Fantic			11	14	13	11	12	Ret					44
7	Triumph	13	13	23	16	15	30	14	15			18	17	47
8	Husqvarna	31	29	29	26	36	32	Ret	DNS			19	19	4
Pos	Bike	SAR (Sardinia)		ESP (Spain)		GER (Germany)		NED (Netherlands)		TUR (Turkey)		AUS (Australia)		Points
