= 2021 FIM Women's Motocross World Championship =

17th Women's Motocross World Championship season

The 2021 FIM Women's Motocross World Championship was the 17th Women's Motocross World Championship season. Courtney Duncan successfully defended her title, after taking her second title in 2020 Yamaha is the defending Manufacturing champion.

== 2021 Calendar ==
A 5-round calendar for the 2021 season was announced on 10 February 2021.

Round	Date	Grand Prix	Location	Race 1 Winner	Race 2 Winner	Round Winner	Report
1	July 25	Czech Republic	Loket	(New Zealand) Courtney Duncan	(New Zealand) Courtney Duncan	(New Zealand) Courtney Duncan	
2	August 1	Belgium	Lommel	(Netherlands) Lynn Valk	(Netherlands) Shana van der Vlist	(Netherlands) Shana van der Vlist	
3	September 4	Turkey	Afyonkarahisar	(Italy) Kiara Fontanesi	(New Zealand) Courtney Duncan	(New Zealand) Courtney Duncan	
4	September 7	Afyon	Afyonkarahisar	(Italy) Kiara Fontanesi	(Italy) Kiara Fontanesi	(Italy) Kiara Fontanesi	
5	October 17	Spain	intu Xanadu	(Netherlands) Nancy van de Ven	(New Zealand) Courtney Duncan	(New Zealand) Courtney Duncan	
6	October 31	Italy	Pietramurata	(Germany) Larissa Papenmeier	(New Zealand) Courtney Duncan	(Germany) Larissa Papenmeier	

== Participants ==
Team	Constructor	No	Rider	Rounds
Bike It MTX Kawasaki	Kawasaki	1	(New Zealand) Courtney Duncan	All
Absolut MX Kawasaki	Kawasaki	2	(Sweden) Sandra Karlsson	1–2
Lakerveld Racing	KTM	5	(Netherlands) Britt Jans-Beken	All
MB Racing Team	Husqvarna	7	(Italy) Giorgia Montini	6
MXFontaRacing Syneco	Gas Gas	8	(Italy) Kiara Fontanesi	All
Team Dragon Moto	KTM	9	(Switzerland) Virginie Germond	All
Team Dragon Moto	KTM	74	(Switzerland) Joyce Zachmann	6
	Husqvarna	11	(Croatia) Mia Ribić	1, 3–4, 6
Yamaha Racing 423	Yamaha	12	(Germany) Alicia Reitze	5–6
Yamaha Racing 423	Yamaha	423	(Germany) Larissa Papenmeier	All
	Husqvarna	22	(Greece) Despina Mandani	3
Yamaha Čepelák Racing	Yamaha	26	(Czech Republic) Aneta Čepeláková	1
Ceres71 Racing Team	Yamaha	28	(Italy) Elisa Galvagno	1–4
Ceres71 Racing Team	Yamaha	85	(Netherlands) Nancy van de Ven	All
	Kawasaki	29	(Iran) Fahimeh Nematollahi	3–4
	Yamaha	30	(Belgium) Brenda Wagemans	1–2
	KTM	32	(United Kingdom) Elaine MacEachern	5
	Honda	35	(Germany) Johanna Neusüß	1
TKH Racing Husqvarna	Husqvarna	36	(United States) Avrie Berry	All
	KTM	38	(Belgium) Shaney Truyts	2
	Husqvarna	42	(Belgium) Britt Van Muylem	2
Buerspro	KTM	51	(Netherlands) Jenitty van der Beek	1–5
Motorrad Waldmann	Honda	55	(Germany) Kim Irmgartz	1
	KTM	62	(Switzerland) Michelle Zünd	1, 6
Team Ecomaxx Fuels	Yamaha	71	(Netherlands) Demi Verploegh	1–2, 5–6
RFME WMX Team	KTM	79	(Spain) Gabriela Seisdedos	All
RFME WMX Team	KTM	255	(Spain) Daniela Guillén	All
Afyonkarahisar Municipality	Gas Gas	88	(Turkey) Irmak Yıldırım	3–4
SK Racing Team	Kawasaki	90	(Switzerland) Sandra Keller	1–4, 6
	Yamaha	94	(Italy) Priska Busatto	
GripMesser Racing Team	Suzuki	111	(Germany) Anne Borchers	1–2, 5
	Yamaha	112	(Belgium) Samina Vermaut	2
Team Lacroce	Yamaha	114	(Italy) Gaia Franchi	1–2
Worx Sports Insurance	Yamaha	125	(United Kingdom) Lauren Collingwood	2
	Yamaha	129	(Canada) Alissa Harkin	6
JK Racing Yamaha	Yamaha	131	(Denmark) Line Dam	All
MC Lumezzane/Dream Team Motos	Husqvarna	136	(Italy) Chantal Pavoni	6
	Husqvarna	143	(Netherlands) Stephanie Stoutjesdijk	1–2, 5–6
Yamaha Store Roskilde	Yamaha	153	(Denmark) Barbara Aagaard	1–2
SKS Husqvarna Racing Team	Husqvarna	172	(Netherlands) Lynn Valk	All
Mad Bros Racing Division	Husqvarna	174	(Italy) Giorgia Giudici	6
Brouwer Motors KTM	KTM	188	(Netherlands) Shana van der Vlist	All
	Gas Gas	193	(Netherlands) Kimberley Braam	1–2
LaCharrette 1807	KTM	220	(France) Mélanie Perez	2
Yamaha Ausio Racing Team	Yamaha	246	(Spain) Jana Sánchez	5–6
BUD Racing Kawasaki	Kawasaki	274	(Belgium) Amandine Verstappen	All
Team New Bike Yamaha	Yamaha	290	(France) Mathilde Denis	1–2
MTX Racing Team	KTM	311	(Czech Republic) Viktorie Lohniská	1
Meccano Moto	Gas Gas	313	(Italy) Marta De Giovanni	6
	Gas Gas	317	(Italy) Desiree Agosti	6
Flex-Box Racing	KTM	325	(Denmark) Sara Andersen	All
	Husqvarna	411	(Netherlands) Mandy Vogelzang	2
Team Made Of	Gas Gas	412	(Italy) Matilde Stilo	1–2
MX Academy Honda	Honda	437	(France) Lisa Guerber	1
Jezyk Racing Team	KTM	469	(United States) Jamie Astudillo	All
Next Level Professional Yamaha	Yamaha	511	(Norway) Martine Hughes	
Motocross Center	Husqvarna	585	(Spain) Mariona Valero	5
	Yamaha	612	(Norway) Mathea Selebø	All
Honda 114 Motorsports	Honda	625	(Australia) Tahlia Jade O'Hare	All
Raunkjær Westside Racing	KTM	644	(Denmark) Laura Raunkjær	5–6
Gas Gas Austria	Gas Gas	699	(Austria) Elena Kapsamer	1, 3
KTM Scandinavia/CJ Handel	KTM	705	(Denmark) Malou Jakobsen	All
BCS Racing	KTM	711	(Netherlands) Danée Gelissen	1–2, 5–6
Oetke Motorradsport	Kawasaki	718	(Germany) Katharina Schultz	1–2
SHR Motorsports	Yamaha	775	(Germany) Alexandra Massury	1, 6
Pardi Racing Team	KTM	912	(Italy) Giorgia Blasigh	All
20 Racing Suspension	Husqvarna	969	(Germany) Fiona Hoppe	1–2, 5–6
	Yamaha	974	(Germany) Janina Lehmann	1–2

Points are awarded to finishers of the main races, in the following format:

Position	1st	2nd	3rd	4th	5th	6th	7th	8th	9th	10th	11th	12th	13th	14th	15th	16th	17th	18th	19th	20th
Points	25	22	20	18	16	15	14	13	12	11	10	9	8	7	6	5	4	3	2	1

== Riders Championship ==
Pos	Rider	Bike	CZE (Czech Republic)		BEL (Belgium)		TUR (Turkey)		TUR (Turkey)		ESP (Spain)		TRE		Points
1	(New Zealand) Courtney Duncan	Kawasaki	1	1	6	3	2	1	2	2	2	1	3	1	268
2	(Netherlands) Nancy van de Ven	Yamaha	5	3	4	4	4	3	3	4	1	2	2	3	237
3	(Italy) Kiara Fontanesi	Gas Gas	6	8	3	2	1	2	1	1	3	3	15	7	227
4	(Germany) Larissa Papenmeier	Yamaha	7	2	10	7	5	4	4	3	4	5	1	2	214
5	(Netherlands) Shana van der Vlist	KTM	2	4	2	1	6	10	6	5	5	11	6	9	197
6	(Belgium) Amandine Verstappen	Kawasaki	4	6	8	9	3	5	5	7	6	7	4	8	184
7	(Netherlands) Lynn Valk	Husqvarna	3	9	1	6	9	7	9	10	8	15	5	4	174
8	(Denmark) Sara Andersen	KTM	11	5	14	10	8	6	7	6	10	4	8	5	159
9	(Spain) Daniela Guillén	KTM	12	7	7	8	12	8	8	8	9	6	7	6	154
10	(Australia) Tahlia Jade O'Hare	Honda	26	10	19	12	10	11	13	9	7	9	9	10	112
11	(Denmark) Malou Jakobsen	KTM	17	14	11	16	11	12	15	13	11	21	10	18	83
12	(Norway) Mathea Selebø	Yamaha	21	12	12	Ret	16	13	14	15	16	10	11	14	77
13	(Italy) Elisa Galvagno	Yamaha	10	15	Ret	13	7	9	10	12					71
14	(Netherlands) Britt Jans-Beken	KTM	8	19	5	5	Ret	DNS	Ret	DNS	14	13	23	13	70
15	(Denmark) Line Dam	Yamaha	9	17	21	15	14	16	18	16	18	14	13	12	69
16	(Switzerland) Virginie Germond	KTM	14	18	27	33	13	15	12	11	17	Ret	21	15	53
17	(United States) Jamie Astudillo	KTM	22	31	26	22	17	14	11	14	Ret	8	16	21	46
18	(Germany) Anne Borchers	Suzuki	13	20	9	11					13	Ret			39
19	(United States) Avrie Berry	Husqvarna	31	16	17	17	19	18	17	18	12	24	18	22	37
20	(Spain) Gabriela Seisdedos	KTM	27	11	15	14	18	20	DNS	DNS	Ret	12	Ret	DNS	36
21	(Italy) Giorgia Blasigh	KTM	16	Ret	13	DNS	20	19	16	20	23	18	25	16	30
22	(Sweden) Sandra Karlsson	Kawasaki	15	13	16	19									21
23	(Italy) Giorgia Montini	Gas Gas											12	11	19
24	(Switzerland) Sandra Keller	Kawasaki	20	Ret	28	28	15	17	Ret	17			17	DNS	19
25	(Spain) Jana Sánchez	Yamaha									15	17	14	Ret	17
26	(Croatia) Mia Ribić	Husqvarna	28	21			21	21	19	19			35	17	8
27	(Netherlands) Jenitty van der Beek	KTM	36	36	18	18	22	22	20	21	DNS	DNS			7
28	(Netherlands) Danée Gelissen	KTM	40	32	24	27					25	16	20	24	6
29	(Austria) Elena Kapsamer	Gas Gas	18	26			Ret	DNS							3
30	(Denmark) Laura Raunkjær	KTM									20	Ret	27	19	3
31	(Italy) Giorgia Giudici	Husqvarna											19	20	3
32	(Germany) Alicia Reitze	Yamaha									19	22	24	23	2
33	(Germany) Fiona Hoppe	Husqvarna	32	25	22	29					24	19	28	33	2
34	(Germany) Janina Lehmann	Yamaha	19	22	Ret	24									2
35	(Netherlands) Kimberley Braam	Gas Gas	30	Ret	20	20									2
36	(Netherlands) Stephanie Stoutjesdijk	Husqvarna	37	29	34	32					21	20	22	26	1
	(Iran) Fahimeh Nematollahi	Kawasaki					24	24	21	22					0
	(Belgium) Brenda Wagemans	Yamaha	24	24	25	21									0
	(Netherlands) Demi Verploegh	Yamaha	39	35	23	23					22	23	29	25	0
	(Turkey) Irmak Yıldırım	Gas Gas					25	25	22	23					0
	(Greece) Despina Mandani	Husqvarna					23	23							0
	(France) Lisa Guerber	Honda	34	23											0
	(Germany) Kim Irmgartz	Honda	23	Ret											0
	(Spain) Mariona Valero	Husqvarna									26	25			0
	(Denmark) Barbara Aagaard	Yamaha	35	28	29	25									0
	(France) Mathilde Denis	Yamaha	25	30	32	30									0
	(Italy) Desiree Agosti	Gas Gas											26	29	0
	(Belgium) Samina Vermaut	Yamaha			30	26									0
	(Germany) Alexandra Massury	Yamaha	29	27									31	27	0
	(Switzerland) Michelle Zünd	KTM	DNQ	DNQ									30	28	0
	(Italy) Marta De Giovanni	Gas Gas											32	30	0
	(Netherlands) Mandy Vogelzang	Husqvarna			31	31									0
	(Switzerland) Joyce Zachmann	KTM											Ret	31	0
	(Italy) Chantal Pavoni	Husqvarna											33	32	0
	(Germany) Katharina Schultz	Kawasaki	33	33	38	36									0
	(Belgium) Britt Van Muylem	Husqvarna			33	37									0
	(Canada) Alissa Harkin	Yamaha											34	34	0
	(Italy) Gaia Franchi	Yamaha	DNQ	DNQ	35	34									0
	(Czech Republic) Viktorie Lohniská	KTM	38	34											0
	(United Kingdom) Lauren Collingwood	Yamaha			37	35									0
	(France) Mélanie Perez	KTM			36	38									0
	(United Kingdom) Elaine MacEachern	KTM									DNS	DNS			0
	(Italy) Matilde Stilo	Gas Gas	DNQ	DNQ	DNQ	DNQ									0
	(Czech Republic) Aneta Čepeláková	Yamaha	DNQ	DNQ											0
	(Germany) Johanna Neusüß	Honda	DNQ	DNQ											0
	(Belgium) Shaney Truyts	KTM			DNQ	DNQ									0
Pos	Rider	Bike	CZE (Czech Republic)		BEL (Belgium)		TUR (Turkey)		TUR (Turkey)		ESP (Spain)		TRE		Points

== Manufacturers Championship ==
Pos	Bike	CZE (Czech Republic)		BEL (Belgium)		TUR (Turkey)		TUR (Turkey)		ESP (Spain)		TRE		Points
1	Kawasaki	1	1	6	3	2	1	2	2	2	1	3	1	268
2	Yamaha	5	2	4	4	4	3	3	3	1	2	1	2	246
3	Gas Gas	6	8	3	2	1	2	1	1	3	3	12	7	230
4	KTM	2	4	2	1	6	6	6	5	5	4	6	5	213
5	Husqvarna	3	9	1	6	9	7	9	10	8	15	5	4	174
6	Honda	23	10	19	12	10	11	13	9	7	9	9	10	112
7	Suzuki	13	20	9	11					13	Ret			39
Pos	Bike	CZE (Czech Republic)		BEL (Belgium)		TUR (Turkey)		TUR (Turkey)		ESP (Spain)		TRE		Points
