= 2026 FIM Women's Motocross World Championship =

Women's Motocross World Championship season

The 2026 FIM Women's Motocross World Championship was the 22nd Women's Motocross World Championship season.

Lotte van Drunen was the defending champion, after taking her second consecutive title in 2025.

After taking the overall win at three of the five rounds, Daniela Guillén became world champion for the first time, and at the same time becoming the first Spanish women's world champion.

== Calendar and Results ==
A 5-round calendar for the 2026 season was announced in November 2025.

Round	Date	Grand Prix	Location	Race 1 Winner	Race 2 Winner	Round Winner	Report
1	23–24 May	France	Lacapelle-Marival	(Italy) Kiara Fontanesi	(Spain) Daniela Guillén	(Spain) Daniela Guillén	
2	30–31 May	Germany	Teutschenthal	(Spain) Daniela Guillén	(Spain) Daniela Guillén	(Spain) Daniela Guillén	
3	18–19 July	United Kingdom	Foxhill	(Italy) Kiara Fontanesi	(Italy) Kiara Fontanesi	(Italy) Kiara Fontanesi	
4	22–23 August	Netherlands	Arnhem	(Netherlands) Lotte van Drunen	(Netherlands) Lotte van Drunen	(Netherlands) Lotte van Drunen	
5	19–20 September	Australia	Darwin	(Spain) Daniela Guillén	(Spain) Daniela Guillén	(Spain) Daniela Guillén	

== Participants ==
Team	Constructor	No	Rider	Rounds
De Baets AIT Racing	Yamaha	1	(Netherlands) Lotte van Drunen	All
Newcastle Powersports	KTM	5	(Australia) Sienna Giudice	5
MX Fonta Racing Syneco	Gas Gas	8	(Italy) Kiara Fontanesi	All
Monster Energy Yamalube Yamaha	Yamaha	9	(United States) Lachlan Turner	5
KG MX Team	Husqvarna	11	(Norway) Jenny Engeland	1-2
Easy Racing	Yamaha	13	(Denmark) Line Dam	2
	Yamaha	14	(Germany) Lisa Bartling	2
	Husqvarna	17	(Germany) Emely Köhler	2, 4
Zweiradsport Brunner	Yamaha	18	(Germany) Katharina Schultz	2
Zweiradsport Brunner	Yamaha	199	(Germany) Tarja Kück	4
JP Pro Honda Baterias Pioneiro	Honda	19	(Brazil) Luanna Neves	1-3
ADAC Sachsen Motorsport	Triumph	20	(Germany) Tanja Schlosser	2
Rauch Powersports	Husqvarna	21	(Austria) Jana Bohle	1-3
Yamaha Čepelák Racing	Yamaha	26	(Czech Republic) Aneta Čepeláková	1-2
Team New Bike Yamaha	Yamaha	41	(France) Lea Lesoil	1, 4
Team New Bike Yamaha	Yamaha	274	(Belgium) Amandine Verstappen	All
Team JPR	Husqvarna	42	(Belgium) Britt Van Muylem	1
Honda Motorcycles Australia	Honda	43	(Australia) Darci Whalley	5
Midwest Racing Team	Husqvarna	50	(United Kingdom) Amber McGregor	3
	KTM	51	(Netherlands) Jenitty van der Beek	4
NR-Service Racing Team	Honda	53	(Denmark) Barbara Aagaard Andersen	1-4
Yamaha Motor Australia	Yamaha	63	(Australia) Madi Simpson	5
Yamaha Motor Australia	Yamaha	84	(Australia) Emma Milesevic	5
Team CRT	Honda	67	(France) Amélie Giraud	1
Team CRT	Honda	83	(France) Alice Stefani	1
Team CRT	Yamaha	238	(France) Louna Masset	1
Dirt Store Triumph Racing	Triumph	76	(United States) Lilly-Ann Pettus	3
	Yamaha	78	(Sweden) Elsa Andersson Löf	1-3
Triumph Aqva Racing	Triumph	79	(Poland) Wiktoria Kupczyk	1-2, 4
	Gas Gas	80	(Italy) Cecilia Polato	5
Enduro Koch Racing	Husqvarna	89	(Germany) Gianna Sturzeck	2
	KTM	99	(Netherlands) Suzy Tausch	3
	KTM	100	(United Kingdom) Hannah Jones	3
Team Moto Canberra	Husqvarna	101	(Australia) Samantha MacArthur	5
Van der Vegt Motors	TM	111	(Netherlands) Kaylee van Dam	4
	Honda	115	(Germany) Mirja Kück	2
WZ Racing Team	KTM	118	(Lithuania) Adrija Skudutytė	1-4
	KTM	125	(United Kingdom) Lauren May Collingwood	3-4
	Gas Gas	127	(Germany) Pauline Sczeponek	2
	Honda	136	(Italy) Chantal Pavoni	1
Honda Moto France	Honda	137	(France) Lisa Guerber	1
CEC Motorcycles	Honda	141	(Sweden) Hilda Sjöberg	1-4
Dixon Racing Team Kawasaki	Kawasaki	151	(New Zealand) Courtney Duncan	All
Team Honda Motoblouz SR Motul	Honda	153	(France) April Franzoni	1-4
DVS Junior Racing TM	TM	172	(Netherlands) Lynn Valk	1-2
Van de Laar Racing	Yamaha	188	(Netherlands) Shana van der Vlist	All
RFME WMX Team	Gas Gas	255	(Spain) Daniela Guillén	All
KTM Sarholz Racing Team	KTM	257	(Germany) Lexi Pachmann	1-2, 4
	Husqvarna	290	(Germany) Rosalie Völker	2
EMEKS Moto	KTM	310	(United Kingdom) Lucy Barker	All
	Husqvarna	333	(Italy) Alessia Di Luccia	4
MB Motocrossteam	Kawasaki	420	(Norway) Rosalita Hovind	1-4
MB Motocrossteam	Kawasaki	612	(Norway) Mathea Selebø	1-4
SYE Racing Team 423	Honda	423	(Germany) Larissa Papenmeier	2
JH MX Service	Triumph	425	(Netherlands) Amber Simons	1-3
	Honda	453	(United Kingdom) Kelly Phillips	3
	Fantic	526	(Netherlands) Kyshara Das	1-2, 4
	KTM	543	(Belgium) Maxime Breugelmans	1-4
	Gas Gas	555	(Germany) Angelina Felici	2
	Husqvarna	573	(Sweden) Wilma Hansson	1-2, 4
MC Sport Racing Team	Gas Gas	587	(Sweden) Tyra Backström	1-4
	Honda	611	(Spain) Natalia Rosado	1
MX-Academy Honda Racing by Meuwissen Motorsports	Honda	644	(Denmark) Laura Raunkjær	1-4
Becker Racing	KTM	699	(Austria) Elena Kapsamer	1-3
	Honda	702	(Denmark) Anna Legaard	2, 4
FiveThreeSeven	KTM	705	(Denmark) Malou Jakobsen	1-4
Krause Racing	Kawasaki	714	(Germany) Sandra Weny	1-2
	Husqvarna	717	(Netherlands) Danée Gelissen	1-4
Smienk Racing Team	Gas Gas	747	(Netherlands) Maylinn-Rose Sterk	4
	KTM	775	(Germany) Alexandra Massury	All
JK Racing Yamaha	Yamaha	841	(Sweden) Nellie Fransson	All
	Yamaha	939	(Germany) Bibi Finnja Bestmann	2
Dörr Motorsport Triumph Racing	Triumph	969	(Germany) Fiona Hoppe	1-2, 4

== Riders Championship ==
Points are awarded to finishers of the main races, in the following format:

Position	1st	2nd	3rd	4th	5th	6th	7th	8th	9th	10th	11th	12th	13th	14th	15th	16th	17th	18th	19th	20th
Points	25	22	20	18	16	15	14	13	12	11	10	9	8	7	6	5	4	3	2	1

Pos	Rider	Bike	FRA (France)		GER (Germany)		GBR (United Kingdom)		NED (Netherlands)		AUS (Australia)		Points
1	(Spain) Daniela Guillén	Gas Gas	2	1	1	1	3	2	2	2	1	1	233
2	(Italy) Kiara Fontanesi	Gas Gas	1	2	2	2	1	1	4	4	4	7	209
3	(Netherlands) Lotte van Drunen	Yamaha	9	3	4	18	4	7	1	1	2	3	177
4	(New Zealand) Courtney Duncan	Kawasaki	12	4	3	10	2	3	5	8	3	4	167
5	(United Kingdom) Lucy Barker	KTM	7	6	8	6	9	4	6	3	6	5	153
6	(Netherlands) Shana van der Vlist	Yamaha	10	7	9	3	5	5	3	5	5	DNS	141
7	(Belgium) Amandine Verstappen	Yamaha	6	8	10	4	7	8	8	9	10	8	133
8	(Denmark) Malou Jakobsen	KTM	4	10	5	8	6	6	7	7			116
9	(Sweden) Nellie Fransson	Yamaha	15	12	16	11	12	11	9	10	9	6	99
10	(Germany) Alexandra Massury	KTM	Ret	13	11	15	10	12	18	14	7	9	80
11	(France) April Franzoni	Honda	3	5	20	9	8	10	DNS	DNS			73
12	(Netherlands) Danée Gelissen	Husqvarna	11	9	Ret	31	11	9	12	6			68
13	(Netherlands) Lynn Valk	TM	5	11	6	5							57
14	(Norway) Mathea Selebøe	Kawasaki	14	16	13	21	13	15	11	11			54
15	(Sweden) Tyra Bäckström	Gas Gas	8	17	15	20	15	19	14	13			48
16	(Sweden) Hilda Sjöberg	Honda	17	15	14	12	18	21	17	17			37
17	(United States) Lachlan Turner	Yamaha									8	2	35
18	(Germany) Larissa Papenmeier	Honda			7	7							28
19	(Norway) Rosalita Hovind	Kawasaki	20	Ret	17	19	22	14	16	16			24
20	(Sweden) Elsa Andersson Löf	Yamaha	Ret	Ret	12	16	20	13					23
21	(Denmark) Laura Raunkjær	Honda	18	19	18	27	21	20	13	15			23
22	(Australia) Emma Milesevic	Yamaha									11	10	21
23	(Netherlands) Jenitty van der Beek	KTM							10	12			20
24	(Netherlands) Amber Simons	Triumph	16	20	23	14	14	Ret					20
25	(Australia) Madi Simpson	Yamaha									12	12	18
26	(Brazil) Luanna Neves	Honda	19	14	Ret	DNS	16	17					18
27	(Australia) Darci Whalley	Honda									14	11	17
28	(Italy) Cecilia Polato	Gas Gas									13	13	16
29	(Australia) Sienna Giudice	KTM									15	14	13
30	(Norway) Jenny Engeland	Husqvarna	13	24	28	17							12
31	(Australia) Samantha MacArthur	Husqvarna									16	15	11
32	(United States) Lilly-Ann Pettus	Triumph					17	16					9
33	(Germany) Tanja Schlosser	Triumph			Ret	13							8
34	(Austria) Elena Kapsamer	KTM	23	18	19	DNS	19	23					7
35	(Germany) Fiona Hoppe	Triumph	24	23	Ret	Ret			15	23			6
36	(Belgium) Maxime Breugelmans	KTM	31	21	29	Ret	26	22	19	18			5
37	(Lithuania) Adrija Skudutytė	KTM	29	30	22	22	23	18	20	22			4
38	(Denmark) Barbara Aagaard Andersen	Honda	25	Ret	24	23	24	24	21	19			2
39	(Denmark) Anna Legaard	Honda			25	28			28	20			1
	(Netherlands) Kyshara Das	Fantic	28	Ret	21	24			22	21			0
	(Czech Republic) Aneta Čepeláková	Yamaha	21	Ret	DNQ	DNQ							0
	(Sweden) Wilma Hansson	Husqvarna	27	22	27	32			23	24			0
	(France) Lisa Guerber	Honda	22	DNS									0
	(Netherlands) Kaylee van Dam	TM							24	26			0
	(Austria) Jana Bohle	Husqvarna	26	25	26	30	27	25					0
	(Germany) Emely Köhler	Husqvarna			36	34			25	25			0
	(United Kingdom) Lauren May Collingwood	KTM					25	DNS	27	28			0
	(Poland) Wiktoria Kupczyk	Triumph	32	27	30	25			29	29			0
	(Netherlands) Suzy Tausch	KTM					28	26					0
	(Germany) Katharina Schultz	Yamaha			35	26							0
	(Belgium) Britt Van Muylem	Husqvarna	36	26									0
	(Germany) Tarja Kück	Yamaha							26	Ret			0
	(United Kingdom) Amber McGregor	Husqvarna					29	27					0
	(Netherlands) Maylinn-Rose Sterk	Gas Gas							31	27			0
	(Germany) Sandra Weny	Kawasaki	30	28	31	DNS							0
	(United Kingdom) Kelly Phillips	Honda					Ret	28					0
	(Germany) Lexi Pachmann	KTM	35	29	33	36			30	30			0
	(United Kingdom) Hannah Jones	KTM					30	29					0
	(Germany) Angelina Felici	Gas Gas			DNQ	29							0
	(Italy) Alessia Di Luccia	Husqvarna							32	31			0
	(Spain) Natalia Rosado	Honda	34	31									0
	(France) Lea Lesoil	Yamaha	33	32					33	32			0
	(Germany) Pauline Sczeponek	Gas Gas			32	33							0
	(Italy) Chantal Pavoni	Honda	DNQ	33									0
	(Germany) Bibi Finnja Bestmann	Yamaha			34	35							0
	(France) Amélie Giraud	Honda	37	34									0
	(France) Alice Stefani	Honda	Ret	35									0
	(Germany) Lisa Bartling	Yamaha			DNQ	38							0
	(France) Louna Masset	Yamaha	DNQ	DNQ									0
	(Germany) Mirja Kück	Honda			DNQ	DNQ							0
	(Germany) Rosalie Völker	Husqvarna			DNQ	DNQ							0
	(Germany) Gianna Sturzeck	Husqvarna			DNQ	DNQ							0
	(Denmark) Line Dam	Yamaha			DNQ	DNQ							0
	(Italy) Alessia Di Luccia	Husqvarna											0
Pos	Rider	Bike	FRA (France)		GER (Germany)		GBR (United Kingdom)		NED (Netherlands)		AUS (Australia)		Points

== Manufacturers Championship ==
Pos	Bike	FRA (France)		GER (Germany)		GBR (United Kingdom)		NED (Netherlands)		AUS (Australia)		Points
1	Gas Gas	1	1	1	1	1	1	2	2	1	1	244
2	Yamaha	6	3	4	3	4	5	1	1	2	2	201
3	Kawasaki	12	4	3	10	2	3	5	8	3	4	167
4	KTM	4	6	5	6	6	4	6	3	6	5	163
5	Honda	3	5	7	7	8	10	13	15	14	11	119
6	Husqvarna	11	9	26	17	11	9	12	6	16	15	83
7	TM	5	11	6	5			24	26			57
8	Triumph	16	20	23	13	14	16	15	23			32
	Fantic	28	Ret	21	24			22	21			0
Pos	Bike	FRA (France)		GER (Germany)		GBR (United Kingdom)		NED (Netherlands)		AUS (Australia)		Points
