= Lotte van Drunen =

Dutch motocross racer

- Nationality: Dutch
- Born: 9 August 2007 (age 19); Gorinchem, The Netherlands
- Current team: De Baets Yamaha MX Team
- Bike number: 1

Lotte van Drunen (born 9 August 2007) is a Dutch professional Motocross racer. By winning the 2024 FIM Women's Motocross World Championship at seventeen years old, Van Drunen became the youngest rider to win the FIM Women's Motocross World Championship. She successfully defended her title in the 2025 FIM Women's Motocross World Championship at just eighteen years old, despite a serious ankle injury.

Prior to her World Championship career, Van Drunen gained notoriety during her youth career. Competing in The Netherlands and around Europe against her male counterparts, she often podiumed or outright won events. As part of this, she finished third in the 65 class of the 2019 FIM Motocross Junior World Championship and third in the EMX85 class of the 2021.

Alongside competing in the FIM Women's Motocross World Championship, Van Drunen became one of the few women to race in a round of the FIM Motocross World Championship. This happened for the first time in a wildcard appearance during the 2024 season.

== Career ==
=== Junior career ===
Due to her family's involvement with the sport, Van Drunen first rode a motocross bike at the age of four. With such an early start in the sport, she was able to enter the youth ranks of the sport within The Netherlands and around Europe, competing regularly against her male counterparts. At the age of nine, Van Drunen was able to become Dutch national champion in the 50cc class. A second national title came in 2018, when Van Drunen won the 65cc class Dutch championship. The 2018 season also saw Van Drunen's profile internationally rise, as her success regionally saw her qualify for the EMX65 class of the 2018 European Motocross Championship. After finishing tenth overall in the EMX65 class, Van Drunen later travelled to Australia to compete in that years FIM Motocross Junior World Championship. Again she achieved notable results, finishing second in the opening race and coming away with fourth overall in the event.

2019 would be Van Drunen's final season on a 65cc machine, which saw her win her third national title in the 65cc Big Wheel class. At European-level, there was further improvement, as she finished sixth overall in the EMX65 class of the 2019 European Motocross Championship. At that years FIM Motocross Junior World Championship, Van Drunen achieved her most notable result up until that point, by taking home the bronze medal with third overall in the 65 class. She moved directly to the 85cc Big Wheel class for the COVID-19 pandemic impacted 2020 season which again saw her achieve success nationally in The Netherlands. The return of international competition the following year saw Van Drunen make her debut in the EMX85 class of the 2021 European Motocross Championship. In sandy conditions, Van Drunen finished second and third to stand on the podium with third overall. She also appeared at the FIM Motocross Junior World Championship in Greece, where she finished twelfth overall.

For the 2022 season, at the age of fourteen, Van Drunen moved up to compete on a 125cc motorcycle and race in the EMX125 class of the 2022 European Motocross Championship. Across the season she scored fourteen championship points, with a standout performance being tenth place in the second race at the Belgian round. Later in the season, Van Drunen competed in the final round of the 2022 FIM Women's Motocross World Championship in Turkey. Still riding a 125, Van Drunen finished seventh in both of the main races to finish seventh overall in her debut at Women's World Championship-level. Alongside this, Van Drunen her run of national titles, by winning the 125cc class title in the Open Netherlands Championship.

=== 250 Career ===
Van Drunen made the move to compete full-time at FIM Women's World Championship-level for the 2023 season. Initially, she was signed to compete for the F&H Kawasaki team but left the team a few months before the start of the season. Competing with help from Laurense Motors, Van Drunen was able to win the first race of the season at the opening round in Sardinia, finishing second overall at the event. A second race win came at the following round in Switzerland to again finish second overall but take away the lead in the championship. She would lose the championship lead one round later but at the Dutch round later in the season would win both races in a dominant performance, to win her first Grand Prix in front of her home crowd. After finishing her first full season in third in the standings, Van Drunen rode in the final round of the EMX250 class of the 2023 European Motocross Championship.

At the end of the 2023 season, it was announced that Van Drunen had signed a deal with Yamaha Motor Europe, to compete for the brand on a multi-year contract. She made her debut for the brand at the Mini O's event in Florida at the end of 2023, picking up two titles. Competing for the De Baets Yamaha MX Team, Van Drunen started the 2024 FIM Women's Motocross World Championship by finishing second overall to her main championship rival Daniela Guillén. After winning three overall Grand Prix and five individual race wins, Van Drunen took her first FIM Women's Motocross World Championship title at seventeen years of age. During the season, Van Drunen competed as a wildcard at the Belgian round of the 2024 FIM Motocross World Championship in the MX2 class. She scored a point in the second race by finishing twentieth and battled with Belgian rider Nicolas Vennekens and Indonesian Delvintor Alfarizi throughout the event.

Van Drunen started off her title defence by winning the opening round of the 2025 FIM Women's Motocross World Championship in Sardinia with a perfect score. Despite this being her only overall win of the season, Van Drunen was able to successfully defend her world title, following a close championship battle with Kiara Fontanesi and Daniela Guillén. Alongside this, she made two starts in the MX2 class of the 2025 FIM Motocross World Championship. With the 2026 FIM Women's Motocross World Championship reduced to ten rounds, van Drunen started her season by competing in three rounds of the MX2 class. She scored seven points across these rounds, albeit against reduced field sizes at the rounds in Spain and Sardinia. To the surprise of many, van Drunen had a tough opening three rounds in WMX, not landing on the podium at all. With her championship chances effectively over, she opted to compete in two rounds of the American women's championship, finishing on the podium in the second of these. A fourth appearance in MX2 came at the Belgian round, where she scored a further point. Van Drunen managed to salvage her world championship season somewhat by winning the penultimate round on home turf and finishing second at the final round, to end the season in third.

== Honours ==
FIM Women's Motocross World Championship

- WMX: 2024 2025 (gold) , 2023 & 2026 (bronze)

FIM Motocross Junior World Championship

- 65: 2019 (bronze)

European Motocross Championship

- EMX85: 2021 (bronze)

Open Netherlands Championship

- 125cc: 2022 (gold)
- 65cc Big Wheel: 2019 (gold)
- 65cc Small Wheel: 2018 (gold) , 2017 (silver)
- 50cc: 2016 (gold)

== Career statistics ==
=== FIM Women's Motocross World Championship ===
==== By season ====
Season	Class	Number	Motorcycle	Team	Race	Race Wins	Overall Wins	Race Top-3	Overall Podium	Pts	Plcd
2022	WMX	401	KTM		2	0	0	0	0	28	22nd
2023	WMX	401	Kawasaki	Laurense Motors Kawasaki	12	4	1	5	3	230	3rd
2024	WMX	401	Yamaha	De Baets Yamaha MX Team	13	5	3	10	5	282	1st
2025	WMX	401	Yamaha	De Baets Yamaha MX Team	12	4	1	9	4	256	1st
2026	WMX	1	Yamaha	De Baets AIT Racing	10	2	1	5	2	177	3rd
Total					49	15	6	29	14	973	

=== FIM Motocross World Championship ===
==== By season ====
Season	Class	Number	Motorcycle	Team	Race	Race Wins	Overall Wins	Race Top-3	Overall Podium	Pts	Plcd
2024	MX2	401	Yamaha	De Baets Yamaha MX Team	2	0	0	0	0	1	65th
2025	MX2	401	Yamaha	De Baets Yamaha MX Team	4	0	0	0	0	0	N/A
2026	MX2	401	Yamaha	De Baets AIT Racing	8	0	0	0	0	8	65th
Total					14	0	0	0	0	9	

==== Grand Prix wins ====
GP wins
GP-win count	Date	Grand Prix	Place
WMX-class
1	20 August 2023	The Netherlands	Arnhem
2	7 April 2024	Sardinia	Riola Sardo
3	12 May 2024	Galicia	Lugo
4	18 August 2024	The Netherlands	Arnhem
5	6 April 2025	Sardinia	Riola Sardo
6	23 August 2026	The Netherlands	Arnhem
