= Daniela Guillén =

Spanish motocross racer

- Nationality: Spanish
- Born: 3 February 2006 (age 20); Blanes
- Current team: RFME WMX Team
- Bike number: 255

Daniela Guillén García (born 3 February 2006) is a Spanish professional motocross racer. Guillén has competed in the FIM Women's Motocross World Championship since the 2021 season. Guillén won the 2026 FIM Women's Motocross World Championship, to become the first Spanish rider to win a women's world title.

In addition to her 2026 world title, Guillén finished second in the Women's World Championship in 2023 and 2024.

She is an eight-time grand prix winner in the WMX class.

Guillén is a two-time winner of the Women's Motocross of European Nations event, where she has captained the Spanish team to victory.

Before racing full-time in the Women's World Championship, Guillén raced against male competition as a junior, winning national titles in France and racing at the Mini O's event in the United States.

== Career ==
=== Junior career ===
Guillén began racing motorcycles at the age of three. As she progressed through the junior ranks in both Spain and abroad, Guillén competed regularly against male counterparts. Amongst her achievements, Guillén finished runner-up in the southwest zone of the 65cc European Motocross Championship in 2016, taking the Minivert 65 championship in France. In 2017, Guillén competed in the Mini O's event in the United States, where she won the Girls (9-11) class. After moving onto an 85cc motorcycle, Guillén was able to repeat her success in the French Minivert series, winning the 85 championship against male opposition in 2018.

During the 2020 season, Guillén made history in the 85cc class of the Spanish Motocross Championship, winning the final round of the series by taking both race wins.

=== Pro career ===
The Spanish federation created an official team to compete in the FIM Women's Motocross World Championship for the 2021 season, with Guillén forming part of the team. After moving from an 85cc motorcycle to a 250cc motorcycle for this move, Guillén finished ninth in her rookie season on the world stage. She only competed at two rounds of the 2022 FIM Women's Motocross World Championship, but was able to podium at both Grand Prix and win her first individual race at her home round in Spain. In addition to this, Guillén won the Spanish Women's Championship title and won both races at the Women's Motocross of European Nations event, where the Spanish team won overall.

The 2023 FIM Women's Motocross World Championship began with Guillén picking up her first overall win at the opening round in Sardinia. Over the six round series, Guillén finished on the overall podium five times, ultimately finishing runner-up in the championship to Courtney Duncan. In addition, she successfully defended her national title in Spain. Guillén further improved in the 2024 FIM Women's Motocross World Championship, winning the opening round in her native Spain. Over the remaining six rounds, she would finish on the podium five more times, which included a second overall win at the final round in Turkey. These results led to Guillén finishing runner-up in the series again, this time behind Lotte van Drunen by just four points. She spearheaded the Spanish team that won the 2024 Women's Motocross of European Nations and won her third Spanish women's championship in a row.

Guillén won two grand prix and four individual race wins during the 2025 FIM Women's Motocross World Championship, eventually finishing third in the standings, one point behind Kiara Fontanesi in second. Opting to compete against male competition domestically, Guillén raced in the MX2 class of the 2025 Spanish Motocross Championship, recording four top-ten race finishes across the five rounds she competed in. Guillén had a strong start to the 2026 FIM Women's Motocross World Championship, taking the overall win at the first two rounds. She lost her championship lead to Kiara Fontanesi at the third round in Great Britain but would gain it back again at the following round. Taking the overall win by winning both races at the final round in Australia sealed Guillén's first world championship title, also the first for a Spanish rider in the women's world championship. Before the final world championship round, Guillén raced a round of the American women's series, where she finished third overall.

== Honours ==
FIM Women's Motocross World Championship

- WMX: 2026 (gold) , 2023 & 2024 (silver) , 2025 (bronze)

Women's Motocross of European Nations

- Team Overall: (Spain) 2022 & 2024 (gold)

Spanish Women's Motocross Championship

- WMX: 2022, 2023 & 2024 (gold) , 2026 (silver)

French Motocross Championship

- Minivert 85: 2018 (gold)
- Minivert 65: 2016 (gold)

== Career statistics ==
=== FIM Women's Motocross World Championship ===
==== By season ====
| Season | Class | Number | Motorcycle | Team | Race | Race Wins | Overall Wins | Race Top-3 | Overall Podium | Pts | Plcd |
|---|---|---|---|---|---|---|---|---|---|---|---|
| 2021 | WMX | 255 | KTM | RFME WMX Team | 12 | 0 | 0 | 0 | 0 | 154 | 9th |
| 2022 | WMX | 255 | KTM | RFME WMX Team | 4 | 1 | 0 | 4 | 2 | 85 | 13th |
| 2023 | WMX | 255 | Gas Gas | RFME WMX Team | 12 | 1 | 1 | 10 | 5 | 240 | 2nd |
| 2024 | WMX | 255 | Gas Gas | RFME WMX Team | 13 | 4 | 2 | 10 | 6 | 278 | 2nd |
| 2025 | WMX | 255 | Gas Gas | RFME WMX Team | 12 | 4 | 2 | 9 | 5 | 248 | 3rd |
| 2026 | WMX | 255 | Gas Gas | RFME WMX Team | 10 | 5 | 3 | 10 | 5 | 233 | 1st |
| Total | | | | | 63 | 15 | 8 | 33 | 23 | 1238 | |

==== Grand Prix wins ====
GP wins
| GP-win count | Date | Grand Prix | Place |
WMX-class
| 1 | 26 March 2023 | Sardinia | Riola Sardo |
| 2 | 24 March 2024 | Spain | intu Xanadú |
| 3 | 8 September 2024 | Turkey | Afyonkarahisar |
| 4 | 24 August 2025 | The Netherlands | Arnhem |
| 5 | 21 September 2025 | Australia | Darwin |
| 6 | 24 May 2026 | France | Lacapelle-Marival |
| 7 | 31 May 2026 | Germany | Teutschenthal |
| 8 | 20 September 2026 | Australia | Darwin |
