= FIM Women's Motocross World Championship =

Women-only motocross championship

- Category: Motocross
- Country: International
- Inaugural season: 2005
- Riders' champion: (Spain) Daniela Guillén
- Constructors' champion: (Spain) Gas Gas

The FIM Women's Motocross World Championship is a women-only motocross championship, inaugurated in 2005, and is a feeder series to the FIM Motocross World Championship.

== Champions ==
Season	Rider	Constructor
2005	(Germany) Stephanie Laier	(Austria) KTM
2006	(New Zealand) Katherine Prumm	(Japan) Kawasaki
2007	(New Zealand) Katherine Prumm	(Japan) Kawasaki
2008	(France) Livia Lancelot	(Japan) Kawasaki
2009	(Germany) Stephanie Laier	(Austria) KTM
2010	(Germany) Stephanie Laier	(Austria) KTM
2011	(Germany) Stephanie Laier	(Austria) KTM
2012	(Italy) Kiara Fontanesi	(Japan) Yamaha
2013	(Italy) Kiara Fontanesi	(Japan) Yamaha
2014	(Italy) Kiara Fontanesi	(Japan) Yamaha
2015	(Italy) Kiara Fontanesi	(Japan) Yamaha
2016	(France) Livia Lancelot	(Japan) Kawasaki
2017	(Italy) Kiara Fontanesi	(Japan) Yamaha
2018	(Italy) Kiara Fontanesi	(Japan) Yamaha
2019	(New Zealand) Courtney Duncan	(Japan) Kawasaki
2020	(New Zealand) Courtney Duncan	(Japan) Yamaha
2021	(New Zealand) Courtney Duncan	(Japan) Kawasaki
2022	(Netherlands) Nancy van de Ven	(Japan) Yamaha
2023	(New Zealand) Courtney Duncan	(Japan) Kawasaki
2024	(Netherlands) Lotte van Drunen	(Japan) Yamaha
2025	(Netherlands) Lotte van Drunen	(Japan) Yamaha
2026	(Spain) Daniela Guillén	(Spain) Gas Gas
