= 2020 FIM Women's Motocross World Championship =

16th Women's Motocross World Championship season

The 2020 FIM Women's Motocross World Championship was the 16th Women's Motocross World Championship season. Courtney Duncan successfully defended her title, after taking her first title in 2019. Kawasaki was the defending Manufacturing champion.

== 2020 Calendar ==
A 6-round calendar for the 2019 season was announced on 16 October 2020.

| Round | Date | Grand Prix | Location | Race 1 Winner | Race 2 Winner | Round Winner | Report |
|---|---|---|---|---|---|---|---|
| 1 | March 1 | United Kingdom | Matterley Basin | (New Zealand) Courtney Duncan | (New Zealand) Courtney Duncan | (New Zealand) Courtney Duncan | |
| 2 | March 8 | Netherlands | Valkenswaard | (Italy) Kiara Fontanesi | (Germany) Larissa Papenmeier | (Germany) Larissa Papenmeier | |
| 3 | September 26 | Lombardia | Mantova | (New Zealand) Courtney Duncan | (Netherlands) Nancy Van De Ven | (Germany) Larissa Papenmeier | |
| 4 | September 29 | (Italy) Citta Di Mantova | Mantova | (Netherlands) Nancy Van De Ven | (New Zealand) Courtney Duncan | (New Zealand) Courtney Duncan | |
| 5 | October 31 | Trentino | Pietramurata | (New Zealand) Courtney Duncan | (Netherlands) Nancy Van De Ven | (New Zealand) Courtney Duncan | |

== Participants ==
| Team | Constructor | No | Rider | Rounds |
|---|---|---|---|---|
| DRT Kawasaki | Kawasaki | 1 | (New Zealand) Courtney Duncan | All |
| Lakerveld Racing | KTM | 5 | (Netherlands) Britt Jans-Beken | 1–3 |
| MXFontaracing | KTM | 8 | (Italy) Kiara Fontanesi | All |
| MXFontaracing | KTM | 912 | (Italy) Giorgia Blasigh | 5 |
| Team Dragon Moto | KTM | 9 | (Switzerland) Virginie Germond | All |
| Team JPR | KTM | 10 | (France) Emma Chaput | 5 |
| Yamaha Racing 423 | Yamaha | 12 | (Germany) Alicia Reitze | All |
| Yamaha Racing 423 | Yamaha | 423 | (Germany) Larissa Papenmeier | All |
| Team VHR KTM Racing | KTM | 14 | (France) Mathilde Martinez | 1–4 |
| RHR Motocross Team | Yamaha | 18 | (Australia) Madison Brown | 1 |
| | KTM | 20 | (United Kingdom) Ria Truman | 1 |
| Cheddar MX | Honda | 26 | (United Kingdom) Catherine King | 1 |
| Team MascotMotor Yamaha | Yamaha | 27 | (Sweden) Ida Djärf Björklund | 1–2 |
| | Yamaha | 30 | (Belgium) Brenda Wagemans | 1 |
| Offroad Tryout | Husqvarna | 35 | (United Kingdom) Nieve Holmes | 1–2 |
| CreyMert Racing | KTM | 36 | (United States) Avrie Berry | 2 |
| | KTM | 36 | (United States) Avrie Berry | 3–5 |
| | Husqvarna | 42 | (Belgium) Britt Van Muylem | 1–2 |
| Motoland Amiens | Yamaha | 52 | (France) Justine Charroux | 1–2 |
| Motorrad Waldmann | Honda | 55 | (Germany) Kim Irmgartz | 3–5 |
| Alf Graarud Motor | Yamaha | 62 | (Norway) Madelen Hofseth Pedersen | 1–2 |
| Laurense Motors | Suzuki | 67 | (Netherlands) Britt Van der Werff | 1–2 |
| Verploegh Racing | Yamaha | 71 | (Netherlands) Demi Verploegh | 1–2 |
| | KTM | 73 | (Italy) Clarissa Tognaccini | 4 |
| RFME MX Women's Team | Kawasaki | 79 | (Spain) Gabriela Seisdedos | 1–4 |
| Ghidinelli Racing s.s.d s.r.l | Yamaha | 85 | (Netherlands) Nancy Van De Ven | All |
| Ghidinelli Racing s.s.d s.r.l | Yamaha | 116 | (Italy) Francesca Nocera | 3–5 |
| SK Racing | KTM | 90 | (Switzerland) Sandra Keller | 3–5 |
| Team AC171 | Yamaha | 99 | (France) Manon Haudoire | 1–2 |
| Team Suzuki Reinecke | Suzuki | 111 | (Germany) Anne Borchers | All |
| Ceres 71 Racing | Yamaha | 121 | (Italy) Elisa Galvagno | All |
| TBS Conversions KTM | KTM | 125 | (Netherlands) Amber Simons | 1–2 |
| Team EasyMX Racing | Yamaha | 131 | (Denmark) Line Dam | 1–4 |
| | Husqvarna | 136 | (Netherlands) Cynthia Swets | 2 |
| Passion MX | KTM | 138 | (United Kingdom) Kathryn Booth | 1 |
| | Husqvarna | 143 | (Netherlands) Stephanie Stoutjesdijk | All |
| Twenty Racing Suspension | Suzuki | 146 | (Germany) Lisa Michels | 1–2 |
| Twenty Racing Suspension | Husqvarna | 969 | (Germany) Fiona Hoppe | 2–5 |
| JK Racing Yamaha | Yamaha | 172 | (Netherlands) Lynn Valk | All |
| Brouwer Motors | KTM | 188 | (Netherlands) Shana van der Vlist | All |
| JBR Alfred Gerrits Motorsport | Kawasaki | 193 | (Netherlands) Kimberley Braam | 2 |
| Racing Team Espoirs CV23 | Yamaha | 203 | (France) Camille Viaud | 1–2, 5 |
| | KTM | 220 | (France) Melanie Perez | 5 |
| BUD Kawasaki Racing | Kawasaki | 274 | (Belgium) Amandine Verstappen | 1–2, 4 |
| BUD Kawasaki Racing | Kawasaki | 301 | (United States) Jordan Jarvis | 1 |
| Team New Bike | Yamaha | 290 | (France) Mathilde Denis | 1–2 |
| | Husqvarna | 317 | (Italy) Desire Agosti | 5 |
| Flex-Box | KTM | 325 | (Denmark) Sara Andersen | 1, 3–5 |
| Team Made of Race Service | Honda | 412 | (Italy) Matilde Stilo | 1–2, 4–5 |
| Team MX Academy | Honda | 437 | (France) Lisa Guerber | 4 |
| | KTM | 461 | (United Kingdom) Nadiya Jones | 1 |
| Jezyk Racing Team | KTM | 469 | (United States) Jamie Astudillo | All |
| EMX Racing | Yamaha | 555 | (Sweden) Emelie Dahl | 1–2 |
| West Coast Motorcycles | Honda | 623 | (Australia) Hannah Bagnall | 1–2 |
| Diga WMX Racing | KTM | 625 | (Australia) Tahlia O'Hare | All |
| GG Racing Team | Husqvarna | 644 | (Denmark) Laura Raunkjær | 3–4 |
| Cofain KTM | KTM | 699 | (Austria) Elena Kapsamer | All |
| Team KTM Scandinavia | KTM | 705 | (Denmark) Malou Jakobsen | All |
| | Yamaha | 974 | (Germany) Janina Lehmann | All |

Points are awarded to finishers of the main races, in the following format:

| Position | 1st | 2nd | 3rd | 4th | 5th | 6th | 7th | 8th | 9th | 10th | 11th | 12th | 13th | 14th | 15th | 16th | 17th | 18th | 19th | 20th |
| Points | 25 | 22 | 20 | 18 | 16 | 15 | 14 | 13 | 12 | 11 | 10 | 9 | 8 | 7 | 6 | 5 | 4 | 3 | 2 | 1 |

=== Riders Championship ===
| Pos | Rider | Bike | GBR (United Kingdom) | | NED (Netherlands) | | LOM | | CDM (Italy) | | TRE | | Points |
|---|---|---|---|---|---|---|---|---|---|---|---|---|---|
| 1 | (New Zealand) Courtney Duncan | Kawasaki | 1 | 1 | 4 | 2 | 1 | Ret | 2 | 1 | 1 | 3 | 207 |
| 2 | (Netherlands) Nancy Van De Ven | Yamaha | 5 | 3 | 2 | 3 | 5 | 1 | 1 | 2 | 5 | 1 | 207 |
| 3 | (Germany) Larissa Papenmeier | Yamaha | 4 | 2 | 3 | 1 | 2 | 2 | 4 | 8 | 2 | 4 | 200 |
| 4 | (Italy) Kiara Fontanesi | Yamaha | 2 | 6 | 1 | 4 | 3 | 5 | 3 | 3 | 6 | 2 | 193 |
| 5 | (Netherlands) Lynn Valk | Yamaha | 3 | 5 | 7 | 5 | 7 | 4 | 7 | 5 | 3 | 5 | 164 |
| 6 | (Netherlands) Shana van der Vlist | KTM | 11 | 12 | 5 | 6 | 10 | 7 | 8 | 7 | 4 | 6 | 135 |
| 7 | (Denmark) Sara Andersen | KTM | 6 | 11 | | | 6 | 3 | 6 | 4 | 7 | 7 | 121 |
| 8 | (Denmark) Line Dam | Yamaha | 9 | 8 | 6 | 7 | 4 | 6 | 9 | 6 | | | 114 |
| 9 | (Germany) Anne Borchers | Suzuki | 17 | 9 | 10 | 9 | 12 | 9 | 13 | 12 | 12 | 13 | 94 |
| 10 | (Australia) Tahlia O'Hare | KTM | 15 | 10 | 15 | 8 | 16 | 8 | 10 | 11 | 15 | 11 | 91 |
| 11 | (United States) Jamie Astudillo | KTM | 16 | 16 | Ret | 13 | 9 | 22 | 11 | 10 | 8 | 8 | 77 |
| 12 | (Denmark) Malou Jakobsen | KTM | 36 | 30 | 18 | 25 | 8 | 17 | 14 | 13 | 13 | 10 | 54 |
| 13 | (Italy) Francesca Nocera | Yamaha | | | | | 11 | Ret | 12 | 14 | 10 | 9 | 49 |
| 14 | (Belgium) Amandine Verstappen | Kawasaki | Ret | 4 | 25 | 36 | | | 5 | 9 | | | 46 |
| 15 | (France) Mathilde Martinez | KTM | 13 | 7 | 13 | 12 | 27 | 21 | 23 | DNS | | | 39 |
| 16 | (Netherlands) Britt Jans-Beken | KTM | 8 | 23 | 9 | 11 | 26 | DNS | | | | | 35 |
| 17 | (Switzerland) Sandra Keller | KTM | | | | | 24 | 10 | Ret | DNS | 9 | 12 | 32 |
| 18 | (Sweden) Emelie Dahl | Yamaha | 12 | 14 | 12 | 14 | | | | | | | 32 |
| 19 | (Netherlands) Britt Van Der Werff | Suzuki | 14 | DNS | 8 | 10 | | | | | | | 31 |
| 20 | (United States) Avrie Berry | KTM | | | 17 | Ret | 13 | 11 | 19 | 21 | 24 | 14 | 31 |
| 21 | (Austria) Elena Kapsamer | KTM | Ret | 31 | DNS | DNS | 18 | 13 | 21 | 16 | 11 | Ret | 26 |
| 22 | (Italy) Elisa Galvagno | Yamaha | 10 | Ret | 23 | 22 | 19 | 15 | 18 | 20 | 19 | 21 | 25 |
| 23 | (Switzerland) Virginie Germond | KTM | 22 | 17 | 29 | 33 | 23 | 12 | 24 | 23 | 14 | 16 | 25 |
| 24 | (United States) Jordan Jarvis | Kawasaki | 7 | 13 | | | | | | | | | 22 |
| 25 | (Germany) Kim Irmgartz | Honda | | | | | 17 | 19 | 15 | 22 | 16 | 17 | 21 |
| 26 | (Germany) Fiona Hoppe | Husqvarna | | | 27 | 15 | 25 | 18 | 16 | 19 | 17 | 20 | 21 |
| 27 | (Spain) Gabriela Seisdedos | Kawasaki | 30 | 15 | 34 | 19 | 14 | 23 | 17 | 26 | | | 19 |
| 28 | (Germany) Alicia Reitze | Yamaha | 25 | 22 | 26 | 35 | 21 | 14 | 20 | 18 | 20 | 18 | 15 |
| 29 | (Germany) Janina Lehmann | Yamaha | Ret | 24 | 31 | 32 | 15 | Ret | 22 | 15 | 21 | 19 | 14 |
| 30 | (Netherlands) Stephanie Stoutjesdijk | Husqvarna | 20 | 28 | 20 | 20 | 20 | 16 | 25 | 17 | 22 | 23 | 13 |
| 31 | (France) Justine Charroux | Yamaha | 23 | 19 | 14 | 18 | | | | | | | 12 |
| 32 | (Netherlands) Amber Simons | KTM | Ret | 35 | 11 | 28 | | | | | | | 10 |
| 33 | (France) Camille Viaud | Yamaha | 24 | 38 | 32 | 29 | | | | | 18 | 15 | 9 |
| 34 | (Netherlands) Kimberley Braam | Kawasaki | | | 16 | 21 | | | | | | | 5 |
| 35 | (Netherlands) Demi Verploegh | Yamaha | 32 | 33 | 35 | 16 | | | | | | | 5 |
| 36 | (Norway) Madelen Hofseth Pedersen | Yamaha | 34 | 34 | 33 | 17 | | | | | | | 4 |
| 37 | (France) Mathilde Denis | Yamaha | 21 | 18 | 21 | 24 | | | | | | | 3 |
| 38 | (Belgium) Brenda Wagemans | Yamaha | 18 | 26 | | | | | | | | | 3 |
| 39 | (United Kingdom) Nieve Holmes | Husqvarna | 19 | 21 | 22 | 27 | | | | | | | 2 |
| 40 | (Sweden) Ida Djärf Björklund | Yamaha | 28 | 27 | 19 | 23 | | | | | | | 2 |
| 41 | (Denmark) Laura Raunkjær | Husqvarna | | | | | 22 | 20 | 26 | 24 | | | 1 |
| 42 | (United Kingdom) Kathryn Booth | KTM | 27 | 20 | | | | | | | | | 1 |
| | (Italy) Giorgia Blasigh | KTM | | | | | | | | | 23 | 22 | 0 |
| | (Netherlands) Cynthia Swets | Husqvarna | | | 24 | 26 | | | | | | | 0 |
| | (France) Melanie Perez | KTM | | | | | | | | | 26 | 24 | 0 |
| | (Australia) Madison Brown | Yamaha | 26 | 25 | | | | | | | | | 0 |
| | (Italy) Desire Agosti | Husqvarna | | | | | | | | | 25 | 26 | 0 |
| | (France) Lisa Guerber | Honda | | | | | | | 27 | 25 | | | 0 |
| | (France) Emma Chaput | KTM | | | | | | | | | 28 | 25 | 0 |
| | (Italy) Matilde Stilo | Honda | DNQ | 37 | 37 | 31 | | | 28 | Ret | 27 | 27 | 0 |
| | (Italy) Clarissa Tognaccini | KTM | | | | | | | Ret | 27 | | | 0 |
| | (France) Manon Haudoire | Yamaha | 29 | 32 | 28 | 30 | | | | | | | 0 |
| | (Germany) Lisa Michels | Suzuki | 31 | 29 | Ret | DNS | | | | | | | 0 |
| | (Belgium) Britt Van Muylem | Husqvarna | 33 | 36 | 30 | 34 | | | | | | | 0 |
| | (Australia) Hannah Bagnall | Honda | 35 | 39 | 36 | 37 | | | | | | | 0 |
| | (United Kingdom) Catherine King | Honda | DNQ | DNQ | | | | | | | | | 0 |
| | (United Kingdom) Ria Truman | KTM | DNQ | DNQ | | | | | | | | | 0 |
| | (United Kingdom) Nadiya Jones | KTM | DNQ | DNQ | | | | | | | | | 0 |
| Pos | Rider | Bike | GBR (United Kingdom) | | NED (Netherlands) | | LOM | | CDM (Italy) | | TRE | | Points |

=== Manufacturers Championship ===
| Pos | Bike | GBR (United Kingdom) | | NED (Netherlands) | | LOM | | CDM (Italy) | | TRE | | Points |
|---|---|---|---|---|---|---|---|---|---|---|---|---|
| 1 | Yamaha | 3 | 2 | 2 | 1 | 2 | 1 | 1 | 2 | 2 | 1 | 230 |
| 2 | Kawasaki | 1 | 1 | 4 | 2 | 1 | Ret | 2 | 1 | 1 | 3 | 207 |
| 3 | KTM | 2 | 6 | 1 | 4 | 3 | 3 | 3 | 3 | 4 | 2 | 200 |
| 4 | Suzuki | 14 | 9 | 8 | 9 | 12 | 9 | 13 | 12 | 12 | 13 | 99 |
| 5 | Husqvarna | 19 | 21 | 20 | 15 | 20 | 16 | 16 | 17 | 17 | 20 | 29 |
| 6 | Honda | 35 | 37 | 36 | 31 | 17 | 19 | 15 | 22 | 16 | 17 | 21 |
| Pos | Bike | GBR (United Kingdom) | | NED (Netherlands) | | LOM | | CDM (Italy) | | TRE | | Points |
