= Selen Tınaz =

Turkish motorcycle racer

- Nationality: Turkish
- Born: 2008 (age 17–18) Arnavutköy, Istanbul, Turkey

Motocross career
- Years active: 2019 – present
- Teams: Arnavutköy Bld. S.K.
- Grands Prix: 1
- Championships: -
- Wins: -
- GP debut: 2023
- First GP win: -

Selen Tınaz (born 2008) is a Turkish motocross racer.

Tınaz got interested in motorcycle riding at the age of five inspired by her motorcyclist father. Coached by her father Yalçın Tınaz, training in the neighboring district Çatalca and racing for the local Arnavutköy Bld. S.K. in Istanbul, she won several medals. In 2019, she became the winner of the 65 cc event at the first leg of the Turkish Motocross Championships. She took the gold medal in the second leg of the 2022 Motocross Championships in Edirne, Turkey. She became Turkish champion in the women's category in 2022. The same year, she took the third place at the East European Motocross Championships. In 2023, she debuted at the FIM Motocross World Championship's MXGP of Turkey racing at the Afyonkarahisar Motor Sports Center. She finished the WMX event on the 19th place, where 21 participants competed. She competes on a Yamaha. She scored five points in her first GP with a 20th and a 17th.

== See also ==
- Irmak Yıldırım (born 2005)
