= Irmak Yıldırım =

Turkish motorcycle racer

- Nationality: Turkish
- Born: 2005 (age 20–21) Balıkesir, Turkey

Motocross career
- Years active: 2019 – present
- Teams: Afyonkarahisar Municipality
- Grands Prix: 4
- Championships: -
- Wins: -
- GP debut: RD 3 2021
- First GP win: -

Irmak Yıldırım (born 2005) is a Turkish motocross racer. She is her country's first female athlete in this sport. She is a native of Balıkesir, Turkey.

Encouraged by her father, Yıldırım started motorcycle riding in 2012. She has been participating in international motocross competitions since 2019. Supported by the Afyonkarahisar Municipality, she competed in the third leg of the 2021 FIM Women's Motocross World Championship held in Afyonkarahisar, Turkey. She placed 25th at the MXGP of Turkey and 23rd at the MXGP of Afyon rounds. She rides on a Gas Gas. She scored two points in the last heat of the 2023 season.

== See also ==
- Selen Tınaz (born 2008)
