= Riola Sardo =

Riola Sardo Arriora
- Comune
- Comune di Riola Sardo
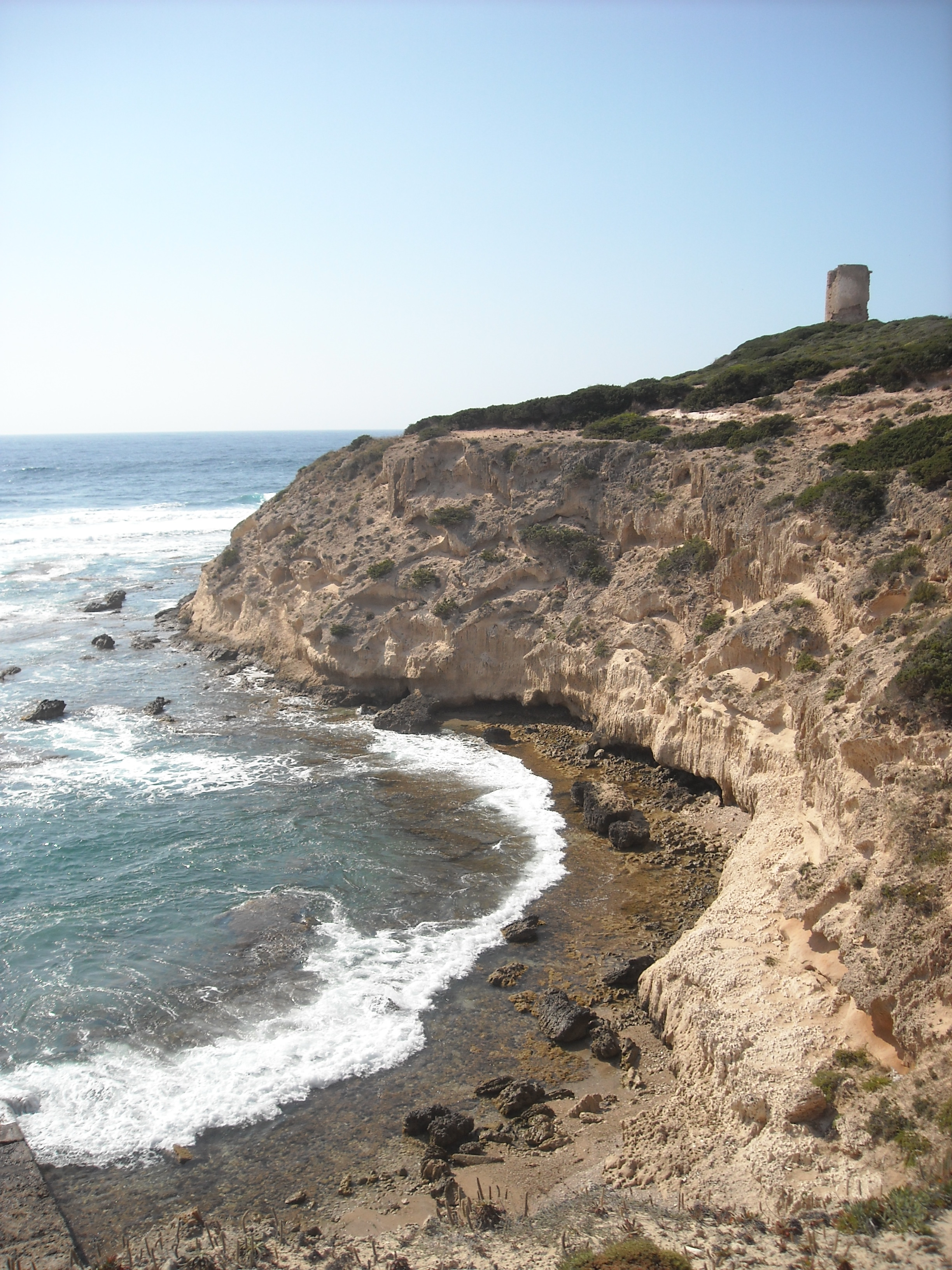
- Cape Mannu

- Location within Sardinia
- Coordinates: 40°0′N 8°33′E
- Country: Italy
- Region: Sardinia
- Province: Province of Oristano (OR)

Area
  - Total: 48.2 km^{2} (18.6 sq mi)
- Elevation: 9 m (30 ft)

Population (Dec. 2004)
  - Total: 2,132
  - Density: 44.2/km^{2} (115/sq mi)
- Demonym: Rioresi
- Time zone: UTC+1 (CET)
  - Summer (DST): UTC+2 (CEST)
- Postal code: 09070
- Dialing code: 0783

Riola Sardo, Arriora or Arriola in the Sardinian language, is a comune (municipality) in the Province of Oristano in the Italian region Sardinia, located about 100 kilometres (62 mi) northwest of Cagliari and about 11 kilometres (7 mi) north of Oristano. As of 31 December 2004, it had a population of 2,132 and an area of 48.2 square kilometres (18.6 mi^{2}).

Riola Sardo borders the following municipalities: Baratili San Pietro, Cabras, Narbolia, Nurachi, San Vero Milis.

== Demographic evolution ==
Historical population

Year	Pop.	±%
1861	1,122	—
1871	1,114	−0.7%
1881	1,110	−0.4%
1901	1,396	+25.8%
1911	1,359	−2.7%

Year	Pop.	±%
1921	1,332	−2.0%
1931	1,411	+5.9%
1936	1,471	+4.3%
1951	1,741	+18.4%
1961	1,943	+11.6%

Year	Pop.	±%
1971	2,043	+5.1%
1981	2,162	+5.8%
1991	2,143	−0.9%
2001	2,137	−0.3%

Source: Data from ISTAT
