= Madrid Xanadú =

Megamall with attractions in Arroyomolinos, Madrid, Spain

Xanadú Shopping Centre

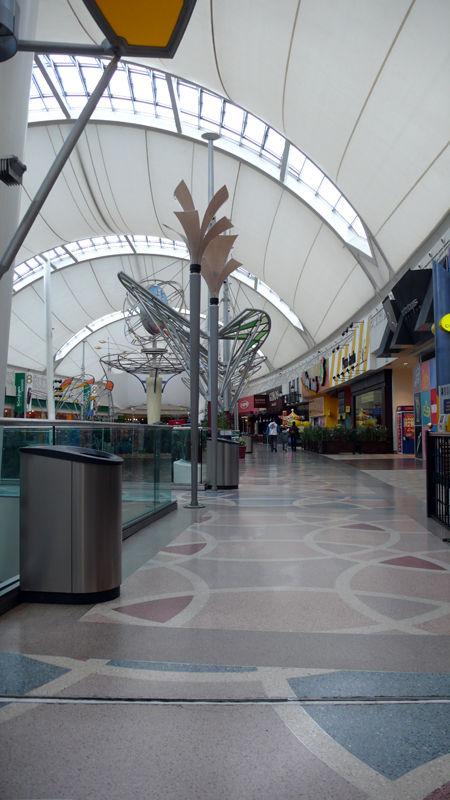
- Madrid Xanadú in April 2007
- Location: Arroyomolinos, Madrid, Spain
- Coordinates: 40°17′57″N 3°55′39″W
- Opened: 16 May 2003; 23 years ago
- Previous names: Madrid Xanadú (2003–2018); Intu Xanadú (2018–2026)
- Developer: The Mills Corporation; KanAm International
- Manager: Alexis Martín de la Peña; CBRE Asset Management
- Owner: Nuveen Real Estate (50%); Rivoli Asset Management (50%)
- Num. of stores: 220+ (at peak)
- Num. of anchor tenants: 18 (at peak)
- Floor area: 110,000 square metres (1,200,000 sq ft)
- Floors: 2
- Parking: Lighted lot
- Website: www.xanadumadrid.com

Xanadú Shopping Centre, formerly Intu Xanadú (stylized intu Xanadú) and Madrid Xanadú, is a super-regional shopping mall and entertainment complex in Arroyomolinos, Madrid, Spain. Constructed next to the Autovía de Extremadura highway, the mall is one of Europe's largest, with over 220 shops, eateries, and a 15-screen Cinesa Movie Theatre. The most distinctive attraction is Madrid SnoZone, an indoor ski slope. The slope is from a Canadian company, Intrawest. The mall was named after the 1980 film Xanadu, starring Olivia Newton-John.

== Amenities ==
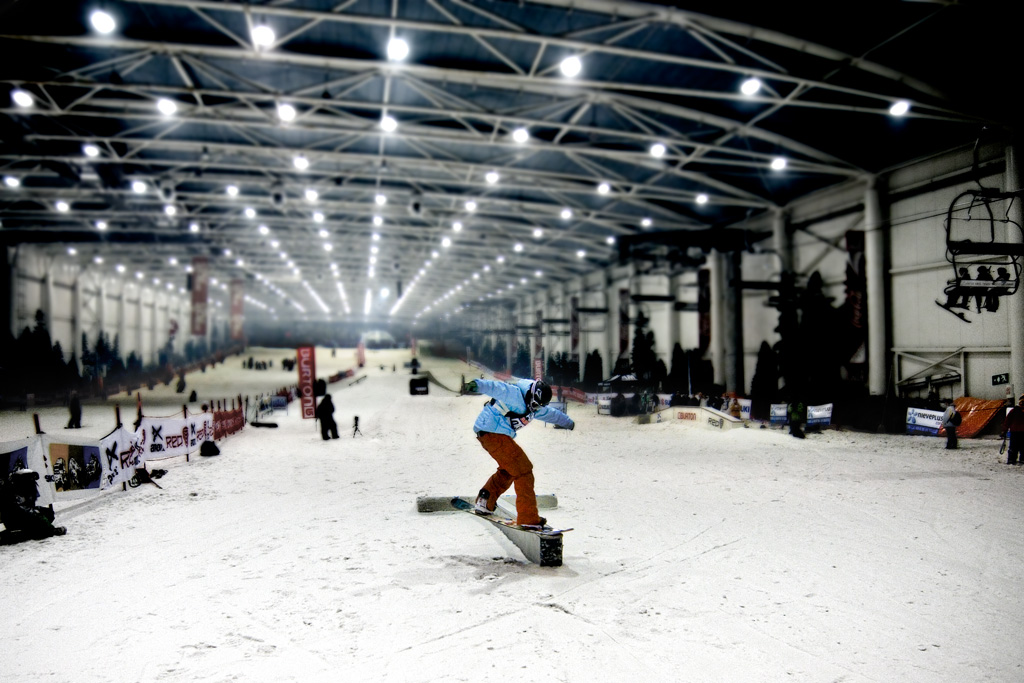
Madrid SnoZone (December 2007)

- Cinesa 15 Theaters
- El Corte Inglés
- Hipercor at El Corte Inglés
- Madrid SnoZone

== History ==
Original logo (2003–2018)

The conception of the initial project, which only contemplated the installation of a ski slope with artificial snow, was the work of Al Yalabi Yafar Yawad, a businessman of Iraqi origin, who acquired the Spanish company PGC (Gonzalo Chacón), owner of the land. Before starting construction, the American-based Mills Corporation formed a joint venture with PGC and the German-based KanAm International to develop a shopping centre and entertainment complex to the track, a specialty business. This would be the Mills Corp.'s first and only shopping mall developed outside of North America. While they did plan to develop other international properties, they were never built.

Madrid Xanadú had its grand opening celebration on 16 May 2003, with immediate success, causing a traffic jam at 11 kilometers of the 27 that separated the complex from the City of Madrid. Originally, Yawad had the open opposition of employers, unions and environmentalists in Madrid. The union Comisiones Obreras (CC.OO.) stated that Decree Law 130/2002, which regulates the opening of shops on holidays, would be violated. To avoid this, the Government of the Community of Madrid chaired by Alberto Ruiz-Gallardón issued another request to declare Arroyomolinos as a tourist municipality, so Madrid Xanadú could stay open year-round. Then, the Federation of Merchants and Entrepreneurs of the South of Madrid (FECOESUR) filed an appeal against the request. That same year, PGC sold its shares in Madrid Xanadú to The Mills Corporation, effectively abandoning the project.

By May 2006, The Mills Corporation was undergoing an investigation by the U.S. Securities and Exchange Commission (SEC) for its financial problems. As a result, on 15 August 2006, Mills sold its international assets—including Madrid Xanadú—for £770 million to the Canadian-based Ivanhoé Cambridge, a subsidiary of Caisse de dépôt et placement du Québec. Primark would open a 2,610 m^{2} (28,100 sq ft) store at the complex on 15 November 2007 and be staffed by approximately 198 people. It was the Irish retailer's fourth Spain location.

As part of an expansion into the Spanish market, the Apple Store would open at Madrid Xanadú in September 2010. In October 2016, seeing that the price of properties with this type of use was rising in Spain, Ivanhoé Cambridge put the complex up for sale.

On 10 March 2017, the sale was closed for nearly £530 million to Intu Properties, a British company that also specialized in the real estate management of shopping centres. As a result, in December 2018, the complex was rebranded as Intu Xanadú. Madrid Xanadú celebrated its 20th anniversary on 23 June 2023, with the presence of presenter Luis Larroder. Over the summer, workshops and musical performances were held at the complex, alongside other initiatives.

== North American version ==
On 29 September 2004, The Mills Corporation started to build its American counterpart, Meadowlands Xanadu in New Jersey. However, ownership changes and countless delays plagued the schedule for the opening. The project was eventually taken over by Triple Five Group, which renamed it American Dream Meadowlands. The "Meadowlands" part of the name was later dropped, and the first phase of the project opened on 25 October 2019. The rest of the mall opened on 5 December 2019, and 1 October 2020.
