= Afyonkarahisar Motor Sports Center =

Motor sports trqack in Afyonkarahisar, Turkey

- Location: Afyonkarahisar, Turkey
- Coordinates: 38°47′08.8″N 30°28′53.1″E
- Owner: Afyonkarahisar Municipality
- Operator: Turkish Motorcycle Federation
- Opened: 2016; 9 years ago
- Major events: Motocross World Championship
- Website: www.turkeymxgp.com
- Surface: Hard pack
- Length: 1.725 km (1.072 mi)
- Turns: 17
- Location of the race track in Turkey

Afyonkarahisar Motor Sports Center (Turkish: Afyon Motor Sporları Merkezi) is a motor sports race track for motocross events in Afyonkarahisar, Turkey. Opened in 2016, the 1,725 m (5,659 ft)-long track has a hard pack type of soil.

The race track was opened after a short construction time in 2016. Owned by the Afyonkarahisar Municipality and operated by the Turkish Motorcycle Federation, it is located at Sadıkbey Mah. and Dörtyol Mah., Turgut Özal Cad., next to the Yeni Şehir Stadiumu in Afyonkarahisar.

The Turkish Motocross Championships in 2016 and 2017. were held at the race track. The finals of the 2019 European Motorcycle Acrobatics Championships took place at the race track. It hosted the MXGP of Turkey on 2 September, the 2018 FIM Motocross World Championship, the MXGP of Turkey on 8 September, the 17th leg of the 2019 FIM Motocross World Championship, the MXGP of Afyon on 9 September as the ninth leg of the 2021 FIM Motocross World Championship, and the WMXGP of Turkey on 4 September and the WMXGP of Afyon on 7 September in the third leg of the 2021 FIM Women's Motocross World Championship, were held .
