= Courtney Duncan (motorcyclist) =

New Zealand motocross racer

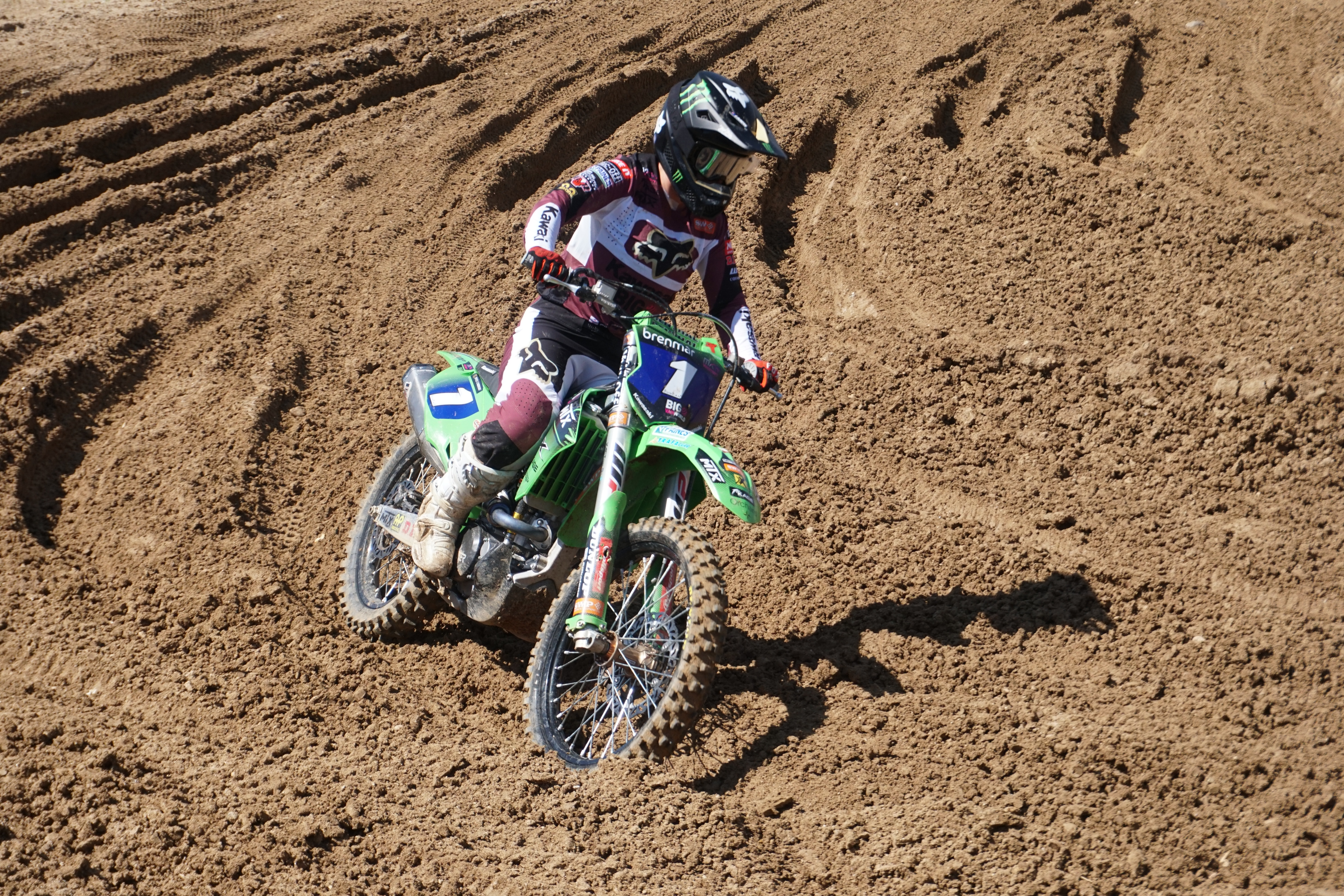
- Courtney Duncan at the Motocross World Championship in Spain
- Nationality: New Zealand
- Born: 26 January 1996 (age 30) Otago, New Zealand

Motocross career
- Years active: 2016–present
- Teams: Altherm JCR Yamaha, Bike It DRT Kawasaki
- Championships: 4 (2019, 2020, 2021, 2023)
- Wins: WMX: 22
- GP debut: 2016 (Qatar, round 1)
- First GP win: 2016 (Qatar, round 1)

Courtney Duncan (born 26 January 1996) is a New Zealand professional motocross racer. She is a four-time WMX Motocross World Champion.

== WMX Results ==
Year	Rnd 1	Rnd 2	Rnd 3	Rnd 4	Rnd 5	Rnd 6	Rnd 7	Average Finish	Podium Percent	Place
2016 WMX	1	2	17	OUT	OUT	1	1	4.40	80%	5th
2017 WMX	1	2	8	1	5	3	-	3.33	67%	3rd
2018 WMX	2	1	1	3	OUT	OUT	-	1.75	100%	4th
2019 WMX	4	1	1	1	1	-	-	1.60	80%	1st
2020 WMX	1	4	8	1	1	-	-	3.00	60%	1st
2021 WMX	1	5	1	2	1	2	-	2.00	83%	1st
2022 WMX	6	OUT	OUT	1	1	-	-	2.67	66%	7th
2023 WMX	3	1	1	1	4	1	-	1.83	83%	1st
