= Kiara Fontanesi =

Italian motorcycle racer

- Nationality: Italian
- Born: Chiara; 10 March 1994 (age 32) Parma, Italy

Motocross career
- Years active: 2011 – present
- Teams: Yamaha Monster Energy
- Grands Prix: 12
- Championships: 6 (2012/2015, 2017/2018)
- GP debut: 2011
- First GP win: 2011

Kiara Fontanesi (born 10 March 1994) is an Italian professional motocross racer. She has competed in the Motocross World Championships since 2011. Fontanesi is notable for being six-time FIM women's motocross world champion.

== Biography ==
Since 2016, Fontanesi is an athlete of the Gruppo Sportivo Fiamme Oro (Fiamme Oro Sports Group).

== Personal life ==
In 2015, Fontanesi was in a relationship with the Spanish MotoGP rider Maverick Viñales. In 2017, she was engaged to the former Aprilia-MotoGP rider, the British Scott Redding. She is currently in a relationship with the boxer Devin Parenti. They have two daughters together.
