= List of 2019 motorsport champions =

2019 motorsport champions
Previous: 2018	Next: 2020

This list of 2019 motorsport champions is a list of national or international motorsport series with championships decided by the points or positions earned by a driver from multiple races where the season was completed during the 2019 calendar year.

== Air racing ==
Series	Champion	refer
Red Bull Air Race World Championship	(Australia) Matt Hall	2019 Red Bull Air Race World Championship
Red Bull Air Race World Championship	Challenger Class: (Germany) Florian Bergér	2019 Red Bull Air Race World Championship
National Championship Air Races	Unlimited: (United States) Steve Hinton	2019 National Championship Air Races
National Championship Air Races	Jet: (United States) Rick Vandam	2019 National Championship Air Races
National Championship Air Races	Sport: (United States) Jeff LaVelle	2019 National Championship Air Races
National Championship Air Races	T-6: (United States) Chris Rushing	2019 National Championship Air Races
National Championship Air Races	Formula One: (United States) Lowell Slatter	2019 National Championship Air Races
National Championship Air Races	Biplane: (United States) Jeff Rose	2019 National Championship Air Races

== Dirt oval racing ==
Series	Champion	refer
Lucas Oil Late Model Dirt Series	(United States) Jonathan Davenport	2019 Lucas Oil Late Model Dirt Series
Oval Superstars Tour	(New Zealand) Shane Dewar	2019 Oval Superstars Tour
USAC Silver Crown Series	(United States) Kody Swanson	2019 USAC Silver Crown Series
USAC Silver Crown Series	Entrant: (United States) Klatt Enterprises	2019 USAC Silver Crown Series
World of Outlaws Craftsman Sprint Car Series	(United States) Brad Sweet	2019 World of Outlaws Craftsman Sprint Car Series
World of Outlaws Craftsman Sprint Car Series	Teams: (United States) Kasey Kahne Racing	2019 World of Outlaws Craftsman Sprint Car Series
World of Outlaws Late Model Series	(United States) Brandon Sheppard	2019 World of Outlaws Late Model Series
World of Outlaws Late Model Series	Teams: (United States) Mark Richards Racing	2019 World of Outlaws Late Model Series

== Drag racing ==
Series	Champion	refer
NHRA Mello Yello Drag Racing Series	Top Fuel: (United States) Steve Torrence	2019 NHRA Mello Yello Drag Racing Series
NHRA Mello Yello Drag Racing Series	Funny Car: (United States) Robert Hight	2019 NHRA Mello Yello Drag Racing Series
NHRA Mello Yello Drag Racing Series	Pro Stock: (United States) Erica Enders-Stevens	2019 NHRA Mello Yello Drag Racing Series
NHRA Mello Yello Drag Racing Series	PS Motorcycle: (United States) Andrew Hines	2019 NHRA Mello Yello Drag Racing Series
European Drag Racing Championship	Top Fuel: (Finland) Anita Mäkelä	
European Drag Racing Championship	Top Methanol: (Belgium) Sandro Bellio	
European Drag Racing Championship	Pro Stock Car: (Sweden) Jimmy Ålund	
European Drag Racing Championship	Pro Stock Modified: (Sweden) Jan Ericsson	

== Drifting ==
Series	Champion	refer
FIA Intercontinental Drifting Cup	(Russia) Georgy Chivchyan	2019 FIA Intercontinental Drifting Cup
British Drift Championship	(United Kingdom) Oliver Evans	2019 British Drift Championship
British Drift Championship	Teams: (United Kingdom) Slide Motorsport	2019 British Drift Championship
British Drift Championship	Pro-Am: (United Kingdom) Lwi Edwards	2019 British Drift Championship
D1 Grand Prix	(Japan) Masashi Yokoi	2019 D1 Grand Prix series
D1 Grand Prix	Teams: (Japan) D-MAX Racing Team	2019 D1 Grand Prix series
D1 Grand Prix	Tanso Series: (Japan) Yusuke Kitaoka	2019 D1 Grand Prix series
D1 Lights	(Japan) Kojiro Mekuwa	2019 D1 Lights
D1 Lights	Tanso Series: (Japan) Keisuke Hatakeyama	2019 D1 Lights
D1NZ	(New Zealand) Darren Kelly	2019 D1NZ season
D1NZ	Pro-Sport: (New Zealand) Michael Thorley	2019 D1NZ season
Formula Drift	(Republic of Ireland) James Deane	2019 Formula Drift
Formula Drift	Auto Cup: (Japan) Toyota	2019 Formula Drift
Formula Drift	Tire Cup: (Japan) Falken Tire	2019 Formula Drift
Formula Drift	Pro-2: (United States) Trenton Beechum	2019 Formula Drift
Formula Drift Japan	(United Kingdom) Andrew Gray	2019 Formula Drift
Drift Masters	(Republic of Ireland) James Deane	2019 Drift Masters
Drift Masters	Nations Cup: (Republic of Ireland) Ireland	2019 Drift Masters

== eSports ==
Series	Champion	refer
Formula One Esports Series	(Italy) David Tonizza	2019 Formula One Esports Series
Formula One Esports Series	Constructors: (Austria) Red Bull Racing Esports	2019 Formula One Esports Series
FIA-Certified Gran Turismo Championships	Nations Cup: (Germany) Mikail Hizal	2019 FIA-Certified Gran Turismo Championships
FIA-Certified Gran Turismo Championships	Manufacturers Series: (Japan) Tomoaki Yamanaka; Manufacturers Series: (France) Rayan Derrouiche; Manufacturers Series: (Brazil) Igor Fraga	2019 FIA-Certified Gran Turismo Championships
FIA-Certified Gran Turismo Championships	Manufacturer: (Japan) Toyota	2019 FIA-Certified Gran Turismo Championships
Gfinity Supercars eSeries	(Australia) Josh Rogers	2019 Gfinity Supercars eSeries
eROC	(United Kingdom) James Baldwin	2019 Race of Champions
McLaren Shadow Project	(Brazil) Igor Fraga	2018–19 McLaren Shadow Project
iRacing
eNASCAR PEAK Antifreeze iRacing Series	(United States) Zack Novak	2019 eNASCAR PEAK Antifreeze iRacing Series
Porsche eSports Supercup	(Australia) Josh Rogers	2019 Porsche eSports Supercup
VRS GT iRacing Series	(Australia) Josh Rogers (Portugal) Ricardo Castro Ledo	2019 VRS GT iRacing Series
iRacing USAC World Championship	(United States) David Heileman	2019 iRacing USAC World Championship
World of Outlaws Late Model Series	(United States) Kendal Tucker	2019 World of Outlaws Morton Buildings Late Model Championship Series
World of Outlaws Sprint Car Series	(Canada) Alex Bergeron	2019 World of Outlaws NOS Energy Drink Sprint Car Championship Series

== Karting ==
Series	Driver	Season article
CIK-FIA Karting World Championship	OK: (Italy) Lorenzo Travisanutto	
CIK-FIA Karting World Championship	OKJ: (Netherlands) Thomas ten Brinke	
CIK-FIA Karting World Championship	KZ: (Netherlands) Marijn Kremers	
CIK-FIA Karting World Championship	KZ2: (France) Émilien Denner	
CIK-FIA Karting Academy Trophy	(Lithuania) Kajus Siksnelis	2019 CIK-FIA Karting Academy Trophy
CIK-FIA Karting European Championship	OK: (Italy) Lorenzo Travisanutto	
CIK-FIA Karting European Championship	OK-J: (France) Marcus Amand	
CIK-FIA Karting European Championship	KZ: (Netherlands) Jorrit Pex	
CIK-FIA Karting European Championship	KZ2: (Sweden) Emil Skärås	
WSK Champions Cup	OK: (United Kingdom) Taylor Barnard	
WSK Champions Cup	OKJ: (Republic of Ireland) Alex Dunne	
WSK Champions Cup	60 Mini: (Italy) Andrea Filaferro	
WSK Euro Series	KZ2: (Italy) Marco Ardigò	
WSK Euro Series	OK: (Italy) Lorenzo Travisanutto	
WSK Euro Series	OKJ: (Italy) Andrea Kimi Antonelli	
WSK Euro Series	60 Mini: (United Arab Emirates) Rashid Al Dhaheri	
Rotax Max Challenge	DD2: (Czech Republic) Petr Bezel	
Rotax Max Challenge	DD2 Masters: (Austria) Robert Pesevski	
Rotax Max Challenge	Senior: (Finland) Axel Saarniala	
Rotax Max Challenge	Junior: (New Zealand) Clay Osborne	
Rotax Max Challenge	Mini: (France) Jolan Raccamier	
Rotax Max Challenge	Micro: (New Zealand) Jay Urwin	
Rotax Max Challenge	Nations Cup: France	

== Motorcycle racing ==
Series	Champion	refer
MotoGP World Championship	(Spain) Marc Márquez	2019 MotoGP season
MotoGP World Championship	Teams: (Japan) Repsol Honda	2019 MotoGP season
MotoGP World Championship	Manufacturers: (Japan) Honda	2019 MotoGP season
Moto2 World Championship	(Spain) Alex Márquez	2019 Moto2 season
Moto2 World Championship	Teams: (Spain) Marc VDS Racing Team	2019 Moto2 season
Moto2 World Championship	Manufacturers: (Germany) Kalex	2019 Moto2 season
Moto3 World Championship	(Italy) Lorenzo Dalla Porta	2019 Moto3 season
Moto3 World Championship	Teams: (Luxembourg) Leopard Racing	2019 Moto3 season
Moto3 World Championship	Manufacturers: (Japan) Honda	2019 Moto3 season
MotoE	(Italy) Matteo Ferrari	2019 MotoE season
Red Bull MotoGP Rookies Cup	(Spain) Carlos Tatay	2019 Red Bull MotoGP Rookies Cup
FIM CEV Moto2 European Championship	(Spain) Edgar Pons	2019 FIM CEV Moto2 European Championship
FIM CEV Moto2 European Championship	Manufacturers: (Germany) Kalex	2019 FIM CEV Moto2 European Championship
FIM CEV Moto2 European Championship	Superstock 600: (Italy) Alessandro Zetti	2019 FIM CEV Moto2 European Championship
FIM CEV Moto2 European Championship	Superstock 600 Manufacturers: (Japan) Yamaha	2019 FIM CEV Moto2 European Championship
FIM CEV Moto3 Junior World Championship	(Spain) Jeremy Alcoba	2019 FIM CEV Moto3 Junior World Championship
FIM CEV Moto3 Junior World Championship	Manufacturers: (Japan) Honda	2019 FIM CEV Moto3 Junior World Championship
British Superbike Championship	(United Kingdom) Scott Redding	2019 British Superbike Championship
British Superbike Championship	BSB Riders Cup: (United Kingdom) Christian Iddon	2019 British Superbike Championship
Superbike World Championship	(United Kingdom) Jonathan Rea	2019 Superbike World Championship
Superbike World Championship	Manufacturers: (Japan) Kawasaki	2019 Superbike World Championship
Supersport World Championship	(Switzerland) Randy Krummenacher	2019 Supersport World Championship
Supersport World Championship	Manufacturers: (Japan) Yamaha	2019 Supersport World Championship
Supersport 300 World Championship	(Spain) Manuel González	2019 Supersport 300 World Championship
Supersport 300 World Championship	Manufacturers: (Japan) Kawasaki	2019 Supersport 300 World Championship
Australian Superbike Championship	(Australia) Mike Jones	

=== Dirt racing ===
Series	Champion	refer
FIM Motocross World Championship	(Slovenia) Tim Gajser	2019 FIM Motocross World Championship
FIM Motocross World Championship	Manufacturers: (Japan) Honda	2019 FIM Motocross World Championship
FIM Motocross World Championship	MX2: (Spain) Jorge Prado	2019 FIM Motocross World Championship
FIM Motocross World Championship	MX2 Manufacturers: (Austria) KTM	2019 FIM Motocross World Championship
FIM Women's Motocross World Championship	(New Zealand) Courtney Duncan	2019 FIM Women's Motocross World Championship
FIM Women's Motocross World Championship	Manufacturers: (Japan) Kawasaki	2019 FIM Women's Motocross World Championship
FIM Enduro World Championship	(United Kingdom) Bradley Freeman	2019 FIM Enduro World Championship
FIM Enduro World Championship	Enduro 1: (United Kingdom) Bradley Freeman	2019 FIM Enduro World Championship
FIM Enduro World Championship	Enduro 2: (France) Loïc Larrieu	2019 FIM Enduro World Championship
FIM Enduro World Championship	Enduro 3: (United Kingdom) Steve Holcombe	2019 FIM Enduro World Championship
FIM Enduro World Championship	Junior: (Italy) Andrea Verona	2019 FIM Enduro World Championship
FIM Enduro World Championship	Junior 1: (Italy) Andrea Verona	2019 FIM Enduro World Championship
FIM Enduro World Championship	Junior 2: (Spain) Enric Francisco	2019 FIM Enduro World Championship
FIM Enduro World Championship	Youth: (New Zealand) Hamish MacDonald	2019 FIM Enduro World Championship
FIM Enduro World Championship	Women: (United Kingdom) Jane Daniels	2019 FIM Enduro World Championship
FIM Enduro World Championship	Open 2-Stroke: (Portugal) Gonçalo Reis	2019 FIM Enduro World Championship
FIM Enduro World Championship	Open 4-Stroke: (United Kingdom) Thomas Ellwood	2019 FIM Enduro World Championship
AMA Motocross Championship	(United States) Eli Tomac	2019 AMA National Motocross Championship
AMA Motocross Championship	250cc: (United States) Adam Cianciarulo	2019 AMA National Motocross Championship
AMA Supercross Championship	(United States) Cooper Webb	2019 AMA Supercross Championship
AMA Supercross Championship	250SX West: (France) Dylan Ferrandis	2019 AMA Supercross Championship
AMA Supercross Championship	250SX East: (United States) Chase Sexton	2019 AMA Supercross Championship

== Open wheel racing ==
Series	Champion	refer
FIA Formula One World Championship	(United Kingdom) Lewis Hamilton	2019 Formula One World Championship
FIA Formula One World Championship	Constructors: (Germany) Mercedes	2019 Formula One World Championship
FIA Formula 2 Championship	(Netherlands) Nyck de Vries	2019 FIA Formula 2 Championship
FIA Formula 2 Championship	Teams: (France) DAMS	2019 FIA Formula 2 Championship
FIA Formula E Championship	(France) Jean-Éric Vergne	2018–19 Formula E season
FIA Formula E Championship	Constructors: (China) DS Techeetah Formula E Team	2018–19 Formula E season
BOSS GP Series	(Austria) Ingo Gerstl	2019 BOSS GP Series
BOSS GP Series	Teams: (Italy) Marco Ghiotto	2019 BOSS GP Series
Indy Lights	(United States) Oliver Askew	2019 Indy Lights
Indy Lights	Teams: (United States) Andretti Autosport	2019 Indy Lights
Indy Pro 2000 Championship	(United States) Kyle Kirkwood	2019 Indy Pro 2000 Championship
Indy Pro 2000 Championship	Teams: (United States) Juncos Racing	2019 Indy Pro 2000 Championship
IndyCar Series	(United States) Josef Newgarden	2019 IndyCar Series
IndyCar Series	Manufacturers: (Japan) Honda	2019 IndyCar Series
IndyCar Series	Rookie: (Sweden) Felix Rosenqvist	2019 IndyCar Series
MRF Challenge Formula 2000 Championship	(United Kingdom) Jamie Chadwick	2018–19 MRF Challenge Formula 2000 Championship
New Zealand Formula First Championship	(New Zealand) Reece Hendl-Cox	2018–19 New Zealand Formula First Championship
F2000 Italian Formula Trophy	(Italy) Andrea Cola	2019 F2000 Italian Formula Trophy
F2000 Italian Formula Trophy	Teams: (Italy) Monolite Racing	2019 F2000 Italian Formula Trophy
Super Formula Championship	(New Zealand) Nick Cassidy	2019 Super Formula Championship
Super Formula Championship	Teams: (Japan) DoCoMo Team Dandelion Racing	2019 Super Formula Championship
FIA Masters Historic Formula One Championship	Fittipaldi/Stewart: (United Kingdom) Henry Fletcher	2019 FIA Masters Historic Formula One Championship
FIA Masters Historic Formula One Championship	Head/Lauda: (Italy) Matteo Ferrer-Aza	2019 FIA Masters Historic Formula One Championship
Atlantic Championship Series	(United States) Dario Cangialosi	2019 Atlantic Championship
Toyota Racing Series	(New Zealand) Liam Lawson	2019 Toyota Racing Series
U.S. F2000 National Championship	(United States) Braden Eves	2019 U.S. F2000 National Championship
U.S. F2000 National Championship	Teams: (United States) Pabst Racing	2019 U.S. F2000 National Championship
Formula Three
FIA Formula 3 Championship	(Russia) Robert Shwartzman	2019 FIA Formula 3 Championship
FIA Formula 3 Championship	Teams: (Italy) Prema Powerteam	2019 FIA Formula 3 Championship
F3 Americas Championship	(United States) Dakota Dickerson	2019 F3 Americas Championship
F3 Americas Championship	Masters Cup: (United States) Global Racing Group	2019 F3 Americas Championship
F3 Asian Championship	(Japan) Ukyo Sasahara	2019 F3 Asian Championship
F3 Asian Championship	Masters Cup: (Hong Kong) Paul Wong	2019 F3 Asian Championship
F3 Asian Championship	Teams: (United Kingdom) Hitech Grand Prix	2019 F3 Asian Championship
F3 Asian Championship (Winter Series)	(Netherlands) Rinus VeeKay	2019 F3 Asian Championship (Winter Series)
F3 Asian Championship (Winter Series)	Masters Cup: (Japan) Tairoku Yamaguchi	2019 F3 Asian Championship (Winter Series)
F3 Asian Championship (Winter Series)	Teams: (United Kingdom) Hitech Grand Prix	2019 F3 Asian Championship (Winter Series)
Australian Formula 3 Championship	(Australia) John Magro	2019 Australian Formula 3 Championship
Australian Formula 3 Championship	National: (Australia) Roman Krumins	2019 Australian Formula 3 Championship
Austria Formula 3 Cup	(Switzerland) Sandro Zeller	2019 Drexler-Automotive Formula 3 Cup
Austria Formula 3 Cup	Trophy: (Switzerland) Florian Münger	2019 Drexler-Automotive Formula 3 Cup
Austria Formula 3 Cup	RAVENOL Formula 3 Cup: (Germany) Dr. Ralph Pütz	2019 Drexler-Automotive Formula 3 Cup
Austria Formula 3 Cup	Swiss Formula 3 Cup: (Switzerland) Sandro Zeller	2019 Drexler-Automotive Formula 3 Cup
BRDC British Formula 3 Championship	(United Kingdom) Clément Novalak	2019 BRDC British Formula 3 Championship
Euroformula Open Championship	(Japan) Marino Sato	2019 Euroformula Open Championship
Euroformula Open Championship	Teams: (Germany) Team Motopark	2019 Euroformula Open Championship
Euroformula Open Championship	Rookies': (New Zealand) Liam Lawson	2019 Euroformula Open Championship
Formula Regional European Championship	(Denmark) Frederik Vesti	2019 Formula Regional European Championship
Formula Regional European Championship	Rookies' Cup: (Denmark) Frederik Vesti	2019 Formula Regional European Championship
Formula Regional European Championship	Teams: (Italy) Prema Powerteam	2019 Formula Regional European Championship
All-Japan Formula Three Championship	(France) Sacha Fenestraz	2019 Japanese Formula 3 Championship
All-Japan Formula Three Championship	Teams: (Japan) B-Max Racing Team with Motopark	2019 Japanese Formula 3 Championship
All-Japan Formula Three Championship	National: (Japan) 'Dragon'	2019 Japanese Formula 3 Championship
Formula Renault Eurocup	(Australia) Oscar Piastri	2019 Formula Renault Eurocup
Formula Renault Eurocup	Teams: (France) R-ace GP	2019 Formula Renault Eurocup
MotorSport Vision Formula Three Cup	(Republic of Ireland) Cian Carey	2019 MotorSport Vision Formula Three Cup
MotorSport Vision Formula Three Cup	Teams: (United Kingdom) CF Racing	2019 MotorSport Vision Formula Three Cup
W Series	(United Kingdom) Jamie Chadwick	2019 W Series
Formula 4
ADAC Formula 4 Championship	(France) Théo Pourchaire	2019 ADAC Formula 4 Championship
ADAC Formula 4 Championship	Teams: (Germany) US Racing-CRS	2019 ADAC Formula 4 Championship
ADAC Formula 4 Championship	Rookies: (Czech Republic) Roman Staněk	2019 ADAC Formula 4 Championship
Australian Formula 4 Championship	(Australia) Luis Leeds	2019 Australian Formula 4 Championship
Australian Formula 4 Championship	Teams: (Australia) AGI Sport	2019 Australian Formula 4 Championship
F4 British Championship	(Barbados) Zane Maloney	2019 F4 British Championship
F4 British Championship	Teams: (United Kingdom) Double R Racing	2019 F4 British Championship
F4 British Championship	Rookie Cup: (Barbados) Zane Maloney	2019 F4 British Championship
China Formula 4 Championship	(New Zealand) Conrad Clark	2019 China Formula 4 Championship
China Formula 4 Championship	Teams: (Hong Kong) BlackArts Racing Team	2019 China Formula 4 Championship
F4 Danish Championship	(Denmark) Malthe Jakobsen	2019 F4 Danish Championship
F4 Danish Championship	Rookies': (Denmark) Largim Ali	2019 F4 Danish Championship
F4 Danish Championship	Formula 5: (Denmark) Lucas Daugaard	2019 F4 Danish Championship
French F4 Championship	(France) Hadrien David	2019 French F4 Championship
French F4 Championship	Junior: (France) Victor Bernier	2019 French F4 Championship
Italian F4 Championship	(Norway) Dennis Hauger	2019 Italian F4 Championship
Italian F4 Championship	Teams: (Netherlands) Van Amersfoort Racing	2019 Italian F4 Championship
Italian F4 Championship	Rookies: (Estonia) Paul Aron	2019 Italian F4 Championship
Italian F4 Championship	Woman Trophy: (United Arab Emirates) Amna Al Qubaisi	2019 Italian F4 Championship
F4 Japanese Championship	(Japan) Ren Sato	2019 F4 Japanese Championship
F4 Japanese Championship	Teams: (Japan) Honda Formula Dream Project	2019 F4 Japanese Championship
F4 Japanese Championship	Independent Cup: (Japan) Sergeyevich Sato	2019 F4 Japanese Championship
NACAM Formula 4 Championship	(Mexico) Manuel Sulaimán	2018–19 NACAM Formula 4 Championship
SMP F4 Championship	(Russia) Pavel Bulantsev	2019 SMP F4 Championship
Formula 4 South East Asia Championship	(Republic of Ireland) Lucca Allen	2019 Formula 4 South East Asia Championship
F4 Spanish Championship	(Argentina) Franco Colapinto	2019 F4 Spanish Championship
F4 Spanish Championship	Teams: (Spain) Drivex School	2019 F4 Spanish Championship
Fórmula Academy Sudamericana	(Brazil) Juan Vieira	2019 Formula Academy Sudamericana season
Formula 4 UAE Championship	(Italy) Matteo Nannini	2019 Formula 4 UAE Championship
Formula 4 UAE Championship	Teams: (United Arab Emirates) Xcel Motorsport	2019 Formula 4 UAE Championship
Formula 4 United States Championship	(Australia) Joshua Car	2019 Formula 4 United States Championship
Formula 4 United States Championship	Teams: (United States) Crosslink / Kiwi Motorsport	2019 Formula 4 United States Championship
JAF Japan Formula 4	(Japan) Kouhei Tokumasu	2019 JAF Japan Formula 4
Formula Ford
Australian Formula Ford Championship	(Australia) Angelo Mouzouris	2019 Australian Formula Ford Championship
F1600 Championship Series	(United States) Jonathan Kotyk	2019 F1600 Championship Series
F1600 Championship Series	Teams: (United States) K-Hill Motorsports	2019 F1600 Championship Series
New Zealand Formula 1600 Championship	(New Zealand) Jordan Michels	2018–19 New Zealand Formula 1600 Championship
Pacific F2000 Championship	(United States) Jason Reichert	2019 Pacific F2000 Championship
Toyo Tires F1600 Championship Series	(Canada) Olivier Bedard	2019 Toyo Tires F1600 Championship Series
Other Junior Formulae
Chilean Formula Three Championship	(Chile) Giovanni Ramirez	2019 Chilean Formula Three Championship
Formula Renault 2.0 Argentina	(Argentina) Guido Moggia	2019 Formula Renault 2.0 Argentina

== Rally ==
Series	Champion	refer
FIA World Rally Championship	(Estonia) Ott Tänak	2019 World Rally Championship
FIA World Rally Championship	Co-drivers: (Estonia) Martin Järveoja	2019 World Rally Championship
FIA World Rally Championship	Manufacturers: (South Korea) Hyundai Shell Mobis WRT	2019 World Rally Championship
World Rally Championship-2 Pro	(Finland) Kalle Rovanperä	2019 World Rally Championship-2 Pro
World Rally Championship-2 Pro	Co-drivers: (Finland) Jonne Halttunen	2019 World Rally Championship-2 Pro
World Rally Championship-2 Pro	Manufacturers: (Czech Republic) Škoda Motorsport	2019 World Rally Championship-2 Pro
World Rally Championship-2	(France) Pierre-Louis Loubet	2019 World Rally Championship-2
World Rally Championship-2	Co-drivers: (France) Vincent Landais	2019 World Rally Championship-2
FIA Junior World Rally Championship	(Spain) Jan Solans	2019 Junior World Rally Championship
FIA Junior World Rally Championship	Co-drivers: (Spain) Mauro Barreiro	2019 Junior World Rally Championship
FIA Junior World Rally Championship	Nations: Spain	2019 Junior World Rally Championship
FIA R-GT Cup	(Italy) Enrico Brazzoli	2019 FIA R-GT Cup
FIA R-GT Cup	Manufacturers: (Italy) Abarth	2019 FIA R-GT Cup
African Rally Championship	(Kenya) Manvir Baryan	2019 African Rally Championship
African Rally Championship	Co-Drivers: (United Kingdom) Drew Sturrock	2019 African Rally Championship
Andros Trophy	(France) Jean-Baptiste Dubourg	2018–19 Andros Trophy
Andros Trophy	Teams: (Belgium) Comtoyou Racing	2018–19 Andros Trophy
Andros Trophy	Elite: (France) Dorian Boccolacci	2018–19 Andros Trophy
Andros Trophy	Électrique: (France) Christophe Ferrier	2018–19 Andros Trophy
Andros Trophy	AMV Cup: (France) Maxime Emery	2018–19 Andros Trophy
Asia-Pacific Rally Championship	(Chinese Taipei) Lin De-wei	2019 Asia-Pacific Rally Championship
Asia-Pacific Rally Championship	Co-Drivers: (China) Le Kepeng	2019 Asia-Pacific Rally Championship
Australian Rally Championship	(Australia) Harry Bates	2019 Australian Rally Championship
Australian Rally Championship	Co-Drivers: (Australia) John McCarthy	2019 Australian Rally Championship
British Rally Championship	(United Kingdom) Matt Edwards	2019 British Rally Championship
British Rally Championship	Co-drivers: (United Kingdom) Patrick Walsh	2019 British Rally Championship
Canadian Rally Championship	(Canada) Karel Carré	2019 Canadian Rally Championship
Canadian Rally Championship	Co-Drivers: (Canada) Samuel Joyal	2019 Canadian Rally Championship
Central European Zone Rally Championship	Class 2: (Slovenia) Rok Turk	2019 Central European Zone Rally Championship
Central European Zone Rally Championship	Production: (Slovakia) Lukáš Lapdavský	2019 Central European Zone Rally Championship
Central European Zone Rally Championship	2WD: (Serbia) Goran Rabasovic	2019 Central European Zone Rally Championship
Central European Zone Rally Championship	Historic: (Italy) Luigi Battistolli	2019 Central European Zone Rally Championship
Czech Rally Championship	(Czech Republic) Jan Kopecký	2019 Czech Rally Championship
Czech Rally Championship	Co-Drivers: (Czech Republic) Pavel Dresler	2019 Czech Rally Championship
Deutsche Rallye Meisterschaft	(Germany) Fabian Kreim	
European Rally Championship	(United Kingdom) Chris Ingram	2019 European Rally Championship
European Rally Championship	Co-drivers: (United Kingdom) Ross Whittock	2019 European Rally Championship
European Rally Championship	Teams: (France) Saintéloc Junior Racing	2019 European Rally Championship
European Rally Championship	Nations Cup: (Czech Republic) ACCR Czech Rally Team I	2019 European Rally Championship
European Rally Championship	ERC-2: (Argentina) Juan Carlos Alonso	2019 European Rally Championship
European Rally Championship	ERC-2 Co-drivers: (Argentina) Juan Pablo Monasterolo	2019 European Rally Championship
European Rally Championship	ERC-3: (Spain) Efrén Llarena	2019 European Rally Championship
European Rally Championship	ERC-3 Co-drivers: (Spain) Sara Fernández	2019 European Rally Championship
European Rally Championship	Ladies Trophy: (Bulgaria) Ekaterina Stratieva	2019 European Rally Championship
European Rally Championship	ERC 1 Junior: (Czech Republic) Filip Mareš	2019 European Rally Championship
European Rally Championship	ERC 1 Junior Co-drivers: (Czech Republic) Jan Hloušek	2019 European Rally Championship
European Rally Championship	ERC 3 Junior: (Spain) Efrén Llarena	2019 European Rally Championship
European Rally Championship	ERC 3 Junior Co-drivers: (Spain) Sara Fernández	2019 European Rally Championship
European Rally Championship	Abarth Rally Cup: (Italy) Andrea Nucita	2019 European Rally Championship
Codasur South American Rally Championship	(Paraguay) Alejandro Galanti	2019 Codasur South American Rally Championship
Estonian Rally Championship	(Estonia) Georg Gross	2019 Estonian Rally Championship
Estonian Rally Championship	Co-Drivers: (Estonia) Raigo Mõlder	2019 Estonian Rally Championship
French Rally Championship	(France) Yohan Rossel	
Hungarian Rally Championship	(Hungary) Ferenc Vincze	
Hungarian Rally Championship	Co-Drivers: (Hungary) Igor Bacigál	
Indian National Rally Championship	(India) Chetan Shivram	
Indian National Rally Championship	Co-Drivers: (India) Dilip Sharan	
Italian Rally Championship	(Italy) Giandomenico Basso	
Italian Rally Championship	Co-Drivers: (Italy) Lorenzo Granai	
Italian Rally Championship	Manufacturers: (France) Citroën	
Middle East Rally Championship	(Qatar) Nasser Al-Attiyah	
NACAM Rally Championship	(Mexico) Ricardo Triviño	2019 NACAM Rally Championship
NACAM Rally Championship	Co-Drivers: (Mexico) Marco Hernández	2019 NACAM Rally Championship
New Zealand Rally Championship	(New Zealand) Ben Hunt	2019 New Zealand Rally Championship
New Zealand Rally Championship	Co-Drivers: (New Zealand) Tony Rawstorn	2019 New Zealand Rally Championship
Polish Rally Championship	(Poland) Mikołaj Marczyk	
Romanian Rally Championship	(Romania) Simone Tempestini	
Scottish Rally Championship	(United Kingdom) Euan Thorburn	2019 Scottish Rally Championship
Scottish Rally Championship	Co-drivers: (United Kingdom) Paul Beaton	2019 Scottish Rally Championship
Slovak Rally Championship	(Poland) Grzegorz Grzyb	
Slovak Rally Championship	Co-Drivers: (Poland) Michał Poradzisz	
South African National Rally Championship	(South Africa) Guy Botterill	
South African National Rally Championship	Co-Drivers: (South Africa) Simon Vacy-Lyle	
Spanish Rally Championship	(Spain) Pepe López	
Spanish Rally Championship	Co-Drivers: (Spain) Borja Rozada	

=== Rallycross ===
Series	Champion	refer
FIA World Rallycross Championship	(Sweden) Timmy Hansen	2019 FIA World Rallycross Championship
FIA World Rallycross Championship	Teams: (Sweden) Team Hansen MJP	2019 FIA World Rallycross Championship
FIA World Rallycross Championship	RX2: (Sweden) Oliver Eriksson	2019 FIA World Rallycross Championship
FIA European Rallycross Championship	(Sweden) Robin Larsson	2019 FIA European Rallycross Championship
FIA European Rallycross Championship	Super1600: (Russia) Aydar Nuriev	2019 FIA European Rallycross Championship
FIA European Rallycross Championship	Touring Car: (Belgium) Steve Volders	2019 FIA European Rallycross Championship
Americas Rallycross Championship	(United States) Tanner Foust	2019 Americas Rallycross Championship
Americas Rallycross Championship	ARX2: (Jamaica) Fraser McConnell	2019 Americas Rallycross Championship
Americas Rallycross Championship	ARX3: (Australia) John McInnes	2019 Americas Rallycross Championship
British Rallycross Championship	(United Kingdom) Julian Godfrey	

== Rally raid ==
Series	Champion	refer
FIA World Cup for Cross-Country Bajas	(Argentina) Orlando Terranova	2019 FIA World Cup for Cross-Country Bajas
FIA World Cup for Cross-Country Bajas	Co-drivers: (Argentina) Ronnie Graue	2019 FIA World Cup for Cross-Country Bajas
FIA World Cup for Cross-Country Bajas	Teams: (Germany) X-Raid Mini JCW Team	2019 FIA World Cup for Cross-Country Bajas
FIA World Cup for Cross-Country Bajas	T2 Cup: (Latvia) Aldis Vilcans	2019 FIA World Cup for Cross-Country Bajas
FIA World Cup for Cross-Country Bajas	T2 Cup Teams: (Latvia) VA Motorsports	2019 FIA World Cup for Cross-Country Bajas
FIA World Cup for Cross-Country Bajas	T3 Cup: (Russia) Fedor Vorobyev	2019 FIA World Cup for Cross-Country Bajas
FIA World Cup for Cross-Country Bajas	T3 Cup Teams: (Russia) Zavidovo Racing Team	2019 FIA World Cup for Cross-Country Bajas
FIA World Cup for Cross-Country Rallies	(France) Stéphane Peterhansel	2019 FIA World Cup for Cross-Country Rallies
FIA World Cup for Cross-Country Rallies	Co-drivers: (Germany) Andrea Peterhansel	2019 FIA World Cup for Cross-Country Rallies
FIA World Cup for Cross-Country Rallies	Teams: (Germany) X-Raid Mini JCW Team	2019 FIA World Cup for Cross-Country Rallies
FIA World Cup for Cross-Country Rallies	T2 Cup: (Qatar) Mohammed Al-Meer	2019 FIA World Cup for Cross-Country Rallies
FIA World Cup for Cross-Country Rallies	T2 Cup Teams: (Qatar) QMMF Team	2019 FIA World Cup for Cross-Country Rallies
FIA World Cup for Cross-Country Rallies	T3 Cup: (Brazil) Reinaldo Marques Varela	2019 FIA World Cup for Cross-Country Rallies
FIA World Cup for Cross-Country Rallies	T3 Cup Teams: (Germany) Monster Energy Can-Am	2019 FIA World Cup for Cross-Country Rallies
FIM Bajas World Cup	(France) Benjamin Melot	2019 FIM Bajas World Cup
FIM Bajas World Cup	Quads: (Russia) Aleksandr Maksimov	2019 FIM Bajas World Cup
FIM Cross-Country Rallies World Championship	(United Kingdom) Sam Sunderland	2019 FIM Cross-Country Rallies World Championship
FIM Cross-Country Rallies World Championship	Manufacturers (Bikes): (Austria) KTM	2019 FIM Cross-Country Rallies World Championship
FIM Cross-Country Rallies World Championship	Quads: (Poland) Rafał Sonik	2019 FIM Cross-Country Rallies World Championship
FIM Cross-Country Rallies World Championship	Manufacturers (Quads): (Japan) Yamaha	2019 FIM Cross-Country Rallies World Championship
Dakar Rally	(Qatar) Nasser Al-Attiyah; Co-driver: (France) Matthieu Baumel	2019 Dakar Rally
Dakar Rally	Bikes: (Australia) Toby Price	2019 Dakar Rally
Dakar Rally	Trucks: (Russia) Eduard Nikolaev; Trucks: (Russia) Evgeny Yakovlev; Trucks: (Russia) Vladimir Rybakov	2019 Dakar Rally
Dakar Rally	Quads: (Argentina) Nicolas Cavigliasso	2019 Dakar Rally
Dakar Rally	UTV: (Chile) Francisco López Contardo; UTV Co-driver: (Chile) Alvaro Quintanilla	2019 Dakar Rally

== Special events ==
Series	Champion	refer
FIA Formula 3 World Cup	(Netherlands) Richard Verschoor	2019 Macau Grand Prix
FIA GT World Cup	(Italy) Raffaele Marciello	2019 FIA GT World Cup
FIA GT World Cup	Manufacturers: (Germany) Mercedes-Benz	2019 FIA GT World Cup
Race of Champions	(Mexico) Benito Guerra Jr.	2019 Race of Champions
Race of Champions	Nations: (Sweden) (Denmark) Nordic	2019 Race of Champions
FIA Motorsport Games
FIA Motorsport Games Digital Cup	(gold) Australia (Cody Nikola Latkovski)	2019 FIA Motorsport Games Digital Cup
FIA Motorsport Games Digital Cup	(silver) Costa Rica (Bernal Valverde)	2019 FIA Motorsport Games Digital Cup
FIA Motorsport Games Digital Cup	(bronze) Italy (Stefano Conte)	2019 FIA Motorsport Games Digital Cup
FIA Motorsport Games Drifting Cup	(gold) Ukraine (Dmitriy Illyuk)	2019 FIA Motorsport Games Drifting Cup
FIA Motorsport Games Drifting Cup	(silver) Czech Republic (Michal Reichert)	2019 FIA Motorsport Games Drifting Cup
FIA Motorsport Games Drifting Cup	(bronze) Russia (Ilya Fedorov)	2019 FIA Motorsport Games Drifting Cup
FIA Motorsport Games Formula 4 Cup	(gold) Italy (Andrea Rosso)	2019 FIA Motorsport Games Formula 4 Cup
FIA Motorsport Games Formula 4 Cup	(silver) Germany (Niklas Krütten)	2019 FIA Motorsport Games Formula 4 Cup
FIA Motorsport Games Formula 4 Cup	(bronze) Finland (William Alatalo)	2019 FIA Motorsport Games Formula 4 Cup
FIA Motorsport Games GT Cup	(gold) Japan (Ukyo Sasahara / Hiroshi Hamaguchi)	2019 FIA Motorsport Games GT Cup
FIA Motorsport Games GT Cup	(silver) Poland (Artur Janosz / Andrzej Lewandowski)	2019 FIA Motorsport Games GT Cup
FIA Motorsport Games GT Cup	(bronze) Australia (Brenton Grove / Stephen Grove)	2019 FIA Motorsport Games GT Cup
FIA Motorsport Games Karting Slalom Cup	(gold) Netherlands (Nina Pothof / Bastiaan van Loenen)	2019 FIA Motorsport Games Karting Slalom Cup
FIA Motorsport Games Karting Slalom Cup	(silver) Belgium (Manon Degotte / Antoine Morlet)	2019 FIA Motorsport Games Karting Slalom Cup
FIA Motorsport Games Karting Slalom Cup	(bronze) Russia (Olesya Vashchuk / Vladislav Bushuev)	2019 FIA Motorsport Games Karting Slalom Cup
FIA Motorsport Games Touring Car Cup	(gold) Russia (Klim Gavrilov)	2019 FIA Motorsport Games Touring Car Cup
FIA Motorsport Games Touring Car Cup	(silver) Belgium (Gilles Magnus)	2019 FIA Motorsport Games Touring Car Cup
FIA Motorsport Games Touring Car Cup	(bronze) Slovakia (Maťo Homola)	2019 FIA Motorsport Games Touring Car Cup

== Sports car and GT ==
Series	Champion	refer
FIA World Endurance Championship	(Switzerland) Sébastien Buemi (Japan) Kazuki Nakajima (Spain) Fernando Alonso	2018–19 FIA World Endurance Championship
FIA World Endurance Championship	Manufacturers: (Japan) Toyota Gazoo Racing	2018–19 FIA World Endurance Championship
FIA World Endurance Championship	LMP2: (France) Nicolas Lapierre; LMP2: (France) Pierre Thiriet; LMP2: (Brazil) André Negrão	2018–19 FIA World Endurance Championship
FIA World Endurance Championship	LMP2 Teams: (France) #36 Signatech Alpine Matmut	2018–19 FIA World Endurance Championship
FIA World Endurance Championship	LMGTE: (Denmark) Michael Christensen; LMGTE: (France) Kévin Estre	2018–19 FIA World Endurance Championship
FIA World Endurance Championship	LMGTE Manufacturers: (Germany) Porsche	2018–19 FIA World Endurance Championship
FIA World Endurance Championship	LMGTE Am: (Germany) Jörg Bergmeister; LMGTE Am: (United States) Patrick Lindsey; LMGTE Am: (Norway) Egidio Perfetti	2018–19 FIA World Endurance Championship
FIA World Endurance Championship	LMGTE Am Teams: (Germany) #56 Team Project 1	2018–19 FIA World Endurance Championship
ADAC GT Masters	(South Africa) Kelvin van der Linde (Switzerland) Patric Niederhauser	2019 ADAC GT Masters
ADAC GT Masters	Teams: (Germany) HCB-Rutronik Racing	2019 ADAC GT Masters
ADAC GT Masters	Junior Cup: (Austria) Max Hofer	2019 ADAC GT Masters
ADAC GT Masters	Trophy Cup: (Germany) Sven Barth	2019 ADAC GT Masters
ADAC GT4 Germany	(Austria) Eike Angermayr (Norway) Mads Siljehaug	2019 ADAC GT4 Germany
ADAC GT4 Germany	Teams: (Switzerland) Hofor Racing by Bonk Motorsport	2019 ADAC GT4 Germany
ADAC GT4 Germany	Trophy: (Germany) Oliver Mayer	2019 ADAC GT4 Germany
ADAC GT4 Germany	Junior: (Germany) Marius Zug	2019 ADAC GT4 Germany
Asian Le Mans Series	LMP2: (United Kingdom) Paul di Resta; LMP2: (United Kingdom) Phil Hanson	2018–19 Asian Le Mans Series
Asian Le Mans Series	LMP2 Teams: (United States) United Autosports	2018–19 Asian Le Mans Series
Asian Le Mans Series	LMP2 Am: (China) Kang Ling; LMP2 Am: (United Kingdom) Darren Burke; LMP2 Am: (Slovakia) Miro Konopka	2018–19 Asian Le Mans Series
Asian Le Mans Series	LMP2 Am Teams: (Slovakia) ARC Bratislava	2018–19 Asian Le Mans Series
Asian Le Mans Series	LMP3: (Poland) Jakub Śmiechowski; LMP3: (Germany) Martin Hippe	2018–19 Asian Le Mans Series
Asian Le Mans Series	LMP3 Teams: (Poland) Inter Europol Competition	2018–19 Asian Le Mans Series
Asian Le Mans Series	GT: (United Kingdom) James Calado; GT: (Japan) Kei Cozzolino; GT: (Japan) Takeshi Kimura	2018–19 Asian Le Mans Series
Asian Le Mans Series	GT Teams: (Japan) Car Guy Racing	2018–19 Asian Le Mans Series
Asian Le Mans Series	GT Am: (Italy) Max Wiser	2018–19 Asian Le Mans Series
Asian Le Mans Series	GT Am Teams: (China) Tianshi Racing Team	2018–19 Asian Le Mans Series
Asian Le Mans Series	GT Cup: (France) Philippe Descombes; GT Cup: (Denmark) Benny Simonsen	2018–19 Asian Le Mans Series
Asian Le Mans Series	GT Cup Teams: (Hong Kong) Modena Motorsports	2018–19 Asian Le Mans Series
Australian GT Championship	(Australia) Geoff Emery	2019 Australian GT Championship
Australian GT Championship	Endurance: (Australia) Geoff Emery; Endurance: (Australia) Garth Tander	2019 Australian GT Championship
Australian GT Championship	GT4: (Australia) Justin McMillan; GT4: (Australia) Glen Wood	2019 Australian GT Championship
Australian GT Championship	Trophy: (Australia) Dale Paterson	2019 Australian GT Championship
Australian GT Championship	Tropheo: (Australia) Nick Karnaros	2019 Australian GT Championship
Britcar Endurance Championship	Overall: (United Kingdom) Paul Bailey; Overall: (United Kingdom) Andy Schultz	2019 Britcar Endurance Championship
Britcar Endurance Championship	Class 1: (United Kingdom) Alastair Boulton; Class 1: (United Kingdom) Tim Gray; Class 1: (Wales) Grant Williams	2019 Britcar Endurance Championship
Britcar Endurance Championship	Class 2: (United Kingdom) Paul Bailey; Class 2: (United Kingdom) Andy Schultz	2019 Britcar Endurance Championship
Britcar Endurance Championship	Class 3: (United Kingdom) Mark Cunningham; Class 3: (United Kingdom) Peter Cunningham	2019 Britcar Endurance Championship
Britcar Endurance Championship	Class 4: (United Kingdom) Tim Docker	2019 Britcar Endurance Championship
Britcar Endurance Championship	Class 5: (United Kingdom) Chris Murphy	2019 Britcar Endurance Championship
British GT Championship	GT3: (United Kingdom) Jonathan Adam; GT3: (United Kingdom) Graham Davidson	2019 British GT Championship
British GT Championship	GT4: (United Kingdom) Tom Canning; GT4: (United Kingdom) Ashley Hand	2019 British GT Championship
British GT Championship	GT3 Teams: (United Kingdom) Barwell Motorsport	2019 British GT Championship
British GT Championship	GT4 Teams: (United Kingdom) TF Sport	2019 British GT Championship
British GT Championship	GT3 Pro-Am: (United Kingdom) Jonny Cocker; GT3 Pro-Am: (United Kingdom) Sam De Haan	2019 British GT Championship
British GT Championship	GT4 Pro-Am: (United Kingdom) Kelvin Fletcher; GT4 Pro-Am: (United Kingdom) Martin Plowman	2019 British GT Championship
British GT Championship	GT3 Silver Cup: (United Kingdom) Bradley Ellis; GT3 Silver Cup: (United Kingdom) Oliver Wilkinson	2019 British GT Championship
British GT Championship	GT4 Silver Cup: (United Kingdom) Tom Canning; GT4 Silver Cup: (United Kingdom) Ashley Hand	2019 British GT Championship
British GT Championship	GT3 Am: (United Kingdom) Greg Caton; GT3 Am: (United Kingdom) Shamus Jennings	2019 British GT Championship
British GT Championship	GT4 Am: (United Kingdom) Steve McCulley; GT4 Am: (United Kingdom) Paul Vice	2019 British GT Championship
British GT Championship	Blancpain Trophy: (United Kingdom) Sam De Haan	2019 British GT Championship
Ginetta GT4 Supercup	(United Kingdom) Harry King	2019 Ginetta GT4 Supercup
Ginetta GT4 Supercup	Amateur: (United Kingdom) Colin White	2019 Ginetta GT4 Supercup
Ginetta Junior Championship	(United Kingdom) James Hedley	2019 Ginetta Junior Championship
GT4 America Series	SprintX Pro-Am: (United States) Greg Liefooghe; SprintX Pro-Am: (United States) Sean Quinlan	2019 GT4 America Series
GT4 America Series	SprintX Am: (United States) Preston Calvert; SprintX Am: (United States) Matt Keegan	2019 GT4 America Series
GT4 America Series	SprintX Teams: (United States) Stephen Cameron Racing	2019 GT4 America Series
GT4 America Series	SprintX Manufacturers: (Germany) Porsche	2019 GT4 America Series
GT4 America Series	East Pro-Am: (United Kingdom) Stevan McAleer; East Pro-Am: (United States) Justin Raphael	2019 GT4 America Series
GT4 America Series	East Am: (United States) Matt Fassnacht; East Am: (United States) Christian Szymczak	2019 GT4 America Series
GT4 America Series	SprintX East Teams: (United States) Park Place Motorsports	2019 GT4 America Series
GT4 America Series	West Pro-Am: (United States) Harry Gottsacker; West Pro-Am: (United States) Jon Miller	2019 GT4 America Series
GT4 America Series	West Am: (United States) Jeff Burton; West Am: (United States) Vesko Kozarov	2019 GT4 America Series
GT4 America Series	SprintX West Teams: (Canada) ST Racing	2019 GT4 America Series
GT4 America Series	Sprint: (United States) Ian James	2019 GT4 America Series
GT4 America Series	Sprint Am: (United States) Drew Staveley	2019 GT4 America Series
GT4 America Series	Sprint Teams: (United States) Team Panoz Racing	2019 GT4 America Series
GT4 America Series	Sprint Manufacturers: (United Kingdom) McLaren	2019 GT4 America Series
GT4 European Series	Silver Cup: (Netherlands) Simon Knap; Silver Cup: (United States) Alec Udell	2019 GT4 European Series
GT4 European Series	Teams: (Germany) Leipert Motorsport	2019 GT4 European Series
GT4 European Series	Pro-Am: (Norway) Marcus Påverud; Pro-Am: (Germany) Luca Trefz	2019 GT4 European Series
GT4 European Series	Am: (Switzerland) Pascal Bachmann; Am: (Luxembourg) Clément Seyler	2019 GT4 European Series
GT Cup Open Europe	(Switzerland) Hans-Peter Koller	2019 GT Cup Open Europe
GT Cup Open Europe	Teams: (Italy) Vincenzo Sospiri Racing	2019 GT Cup Open Europe
GT Cup Open Europe	Silver Cup: (Spain) Marc de Fulgencio; Silver Cup: (Brazil) Thiago Vivacqua	2019 GT Cup Open Europe
GT Cup Open Europe	Pro-Am: (Switzerland) Hans-Peter Koller	2019 GT Cup Open Europe
GT Cup Open Europe	Am: (Switzerland) Niki Leutweiler	2019 GT Cup Open Europe
IMSA Prototype Challenge	(United States) Austin McCusker (Peru) Rodrigo Pflucker	2019 IMSA Prototype Challenge
IMSA Prototype Challenge	Teams: (United States) #47 Forty 7 Motorsports	2019 IMSA Prototype Challenge
IMSA Prototype Challenge	Bronze Cup: (United States) Joel Janco; Bronze Cup: (United States) Jonathan Jorge	2019 IMSA Prototype Challenge
Intercontinental GT Challenge	(Norway) Dennis Olsen	2019 Intercontinental GT Challenge
Intercontinental GT Challenge	Constructors: (Germany) Porsche	2019 Intercontinental GT Challenge
Intercontinental GT Challenge	Bronze: (Australia) Kenny Habul	2019 Intercontinental GT Challenge
International GT Open	(Italy) Giacomo Altoè (Spain) Albert Costa	2019 International GT Open
International GT Open	Teams: (Switzerland) Emil Frey Racing	2019 International GT Open
International GT Open	Pro-Am: (United Kingdom) Tom Onslow-Cole; Pro-Am: (Germany) Valentin Pierburg	2019 International GT Open
International GT Open	Am: (Italy) Giuseppe Cipriani	2019 International GT Open
Michelin Le Mans Cup	LMP3: (United Kingdom) Duncan Tappy; LMP3: (United Kingdom) Michael Benham	2019 Michelin Le Mans Cup
Michelin Le Mans Cup	LMP3 Teams: (United Kingdom) Lanan Racing	2019 Michelin Le Mans Cup
Michelin Le Mans Cup	GT3: (Italy) Giacomo Piccini; GT3: (Italy) Sergio Pianezzola	2019 Michelin Le Mans Cup
Michelin Le Mans Cup	GT3 Teams: (Switzerland) Kessel Racing	2019 Michelin Le Mans Cup
Michelin Pilot Challenge	Grand Sport: (United States) Tyler McQuarrie; Grand Sport: (United States) Jeff Westphal	2019 Michelin Pilot Challenge
Michelin Pilot Challenge	Grand Sport Teams: (United States) #39 Carbahn with Peregrine Racing	2019 Michelin Pilot Challenge
Michelin Pilot Challenge	Grand Sport Manufacturers: (Germany) Mercedes-AMG	2019 Michelin Pilot Challenge
Michelin Pilot Challenge	Touring Car: (United States) Michael Lewis; Touring Car: (Canada) Mark Wilkins	2019 Michelin Pilot Challenge
Michelin Pilot Challenge	Touring Car Teams: (United States) #98 Bryan Herta Autosport with Curb-Agajanian	2019 Michelin Pilot Challenge
Michelin Pilot Challenge	Touring Car Manufacturers: (Germany) Audi	2019 Michelin Pilot Challenge
Super GT Series	(Japan) Kazuya Oshima (Japan) Kenta Yamashita	2019 Super GT Series
Super GT Series	GT300: (Japan) Shinichi Takagi; GT300: (Japan) Nirei Fukuzumi	2019 Super GT Series
Toyota 86 Racing Series	(Australia) Aaron Borg	2019 Toyota 86 Racing Series
Toyota Finance 86 Championship	(New Zealand) Callum Hedge	2018–19 Toyota Finance 86 Championship
WeatherTech SportsCar Championship	DPi: (United States) Dane Cameron; DPi: (Colombia) Juan Pablo Montoya	2019 WeatherTech SportsCar Championship
WeatherTech SportsCar Championship	DPi Teams: (United States) #6 Acura Team Penske	2019 WeatherTech SportsCar Championship
WeatherTech SportsCar Championship	LMP2: (United States) Matt McMurry	2019 WeatherTech SportsCar Championship
WeatherTech SportsCar Championship	LMP2 Teams: (United States) #52 PR1/Mathiasen Motorsports	2019 WeatherTech SportsCar Championship
WeatherTech SportsCar Championship	GTLM: (New Zealand) Earl Bamber; GTLM: (Belgium) Laurens Vanthoor	2019 WeatherTech SportsCar Championship
WeatherTech SportsCar Championship	GTLM Teams: (United States) #912 Porsche GT Team	2019 WeatherTech SportsCar Championship
WeatherTech SportsCar Championship	GTD: (Germany) Mario Farnbacher; GTD: (United States) Trent Hindman	2019 WeatherTech SportsCar Championship
WeatherTech SportsCar Championship	GTD Teams: (United States) #86 Meyer-Shank Racing with Curb Agajanian	2019 WeatherTech SportsCar Championship
Automobile Club de l'Ouest
Asian Le Mans Series	LMP2 Pro： (United Kingdom) Paul di Resta; LMP2 Pro： (United Kingdom) Phil Hanson	2018–19 Asian Le Mans Series
Asian Le Mans Series	LMP2 Pro Teams: (United States) #22 United Autosports	2018–19 Asian Le Mans Series
Asian Le Mans Series	LMP2 Am: (Slovakia) Miro Konôpka; LMP2 Am: (China) Kang Ling; LMP2 Am: (United Kingdom) Darren Burke	2018–19 Asian Le Mans Series
Asian Le Mans Series	LMP2 Am Teams: (Slovakia) #4 ARC Bratislava	2018–19 Asian Le Mans Series
Asian Le Mans Series	LMP3: (Poland) Jakub Śmiechowski; LMP3: (Germany) Martin Hippe	2018–19 Asian Le Mans Series
Asian Le Mans Series	LMP3 Teams: (Poland) #13 Inter Europol Competition	2018–19 Asian Le Mans Series
Asian Le Mans Series	GT: (United Kingdom) James Calado; GT: (Japan) Kei Cozzolino; GT: (Japan) Takeshi Kimura	2018–19 Asian Le Mans Series
Asian Le Mans Series	GT Teams: (Japan) No. 11 CarGuy Racing	2018–19 Asian Le Mans Series
Asian Le Mans Series	GT Am: (Switzerland) Massimiliano Wiser	2018–19 Asian Le Mans Series
Asian Le Mans Series	GT Am Teams: (China) Tianshi Racing Team #66	2018–19 Asian Le Mans Series
Asian Le Mans Series	GT Cup: (France) Philippe Descombes; GT Cup: (Denmark) Benny Simonsen	2018–19 Asian Le Mans Series
Asian Le Mans Series	GT Cup Teams: (Hong Kong) No. 16 Modena Motorsports	2018–19 Asian Le Mans Series
24H Series
24H Continents Series	(Germany) Harald Schlotter	2019 24H GT Series
24H Continents Series	Teams: (Germany) Leipert Motorsport	2019 24H GT Series
24H Continents Series	A6: (Germany) Elmar Grimm; A6: (Germany) Johannes Kirchhoff	2019 24H GT Series
24H Continents Series	A6 Teams: (Germany) Car Collection Motorsport	2019 24H GT Series
24H Continents Series	A6-Am: (Germany) Elmar Grimm; A6-Am: (Germany) Johannes Kirchhoff	2019 24H GT Series
24H Continents Series	A6-Am Teams: (Germany) Car Collection Motorsport	2019 24H GT Series
24H Continents Series	SPX: (Germany) Harald Schlotter	2019 24H GT Series
24H Continents Series	SPX Teams: (Germany) Leipert Motorsport	2019 24H GT Series
24H Continents Series	991: (France) Frédéric Ancel	2019 24H GT Series
24H Continents Series	991 Teams: (France) Porsche Lorient Racing	2019 24H GT Series
24H Continents Series	GT4: (Germany) Björn Simon; GT4: (Germany) Olaf Meyer; GT4: (United States) Simon Tibbett	2019 24H GT Series
24H Continents Series	GT4 Teams: (Germany) Sorg Rennsport	2019 24H GT Series
24H Europe Series	(Italy) Matteo Malucelli (Czech Republic) Jiří Písařík (Czech Republic) Josef Král	2019 24H GT Series
24H Europe Series	Teams: (Czech Republic) Bohemia Energy Racing with Scuderia Praha	2019 24H GT Series
24H Europe Series	A6: (Italy) Matteo Malucelli; A6: (Czech Republic) Jiří Písařík; A6: (Czech Republic) Josef Král	2019 24H GT Series
24H Europe Series	A6 Teams: (Czech Republic) Bohemia Energy Racing with Scuderia Praha	2019 24H GT Series
24H Europe Series	A6-Pro: (Italy) Matteo Malucelli; A6-Pro: (Czech Republic) Jiří Písařík; A6-Pro: (Czech Republic) Josef Král	2019 24H GT Series
24H Europe Series	A6-Pro Teams: (Czech Republic) Bohemia Energy Racing with Scuderia Praha	2019 24H GT Series
24H Europe Series	A6-Am: (Germany) Edward Lewis Brauner	2019 24H GT Series
24H Europe Series	A6-Am Teams: (Germany) Herberth Motorsport	2019 24H GT Series
24H Europe Series	SPX: (United States) Jim Briody; SPX: (Netherlands) Cor Euser; SPX: (United Kingdom) Ricky Coomber; SPX: (Norway) Einar Thorsen	2019 24H GT Series
24H Europe Series	SPX Teams: (Netherlands) Cor Euser Racing	2019 24H GT Series
24H Europe Series	991: (France) Frédéric Ancel; 991: (France) Jean-François Demorge	2019 24H GT Series
24H Europe Series	991 Teams: (France) Porsche Lorient Racing	2019 24H GT Series
24H Europe Series	SP2: (Czech Republic) Tomas Miniberger; SP2: (Czech Republic) Erik Janiš	2019 24H GT Series
24H Europe Series	SP2 Teams: (Czech Republic) RTR Projects	2019 24H GT Series
24H Europe Series	GT4: (Austria) Michael Fischer; GT4: (Austria) Thomas Jäger	2019 24H GT Series
24H Europe Series	GT4 Teams: (Switzerland) Hofor Racing powered by Bonk Motorsport	2019 24H GT Series
24H Europe Series	Ladies Cup: (Austria) Laura Kraihamer	2019 24H GT Series
24H Europe Series	Junior Cup: (Austria) Michael Fischer	2019 24H GT Series
24H Middle East Series	(Italy) Ivan Bellarosa (Italy) Guglielmo Belotti	2019 24H Middle East Series
24H Middle East Series	Teams: (Italy) #45 Avelon Formula	2019 24H Middle East Series
24H Middle East Series	SPX: (Lebanon) Yusif Bassil; SPX: (Oman) Al Faisal Al Zubair	2019 24H Middle East Series
24H Middle East Series	SPX Teams: (Belgium) #78 Speed Lover	2019 24H Middle East Series
24H Middle East Series	TCR: (Netherlands) Luc Breukers	2019 24H Middle East Series
24H Middle East Series	TCR Teams: (Netherlands) #101 Red Camel-Jordans.nl	2019 24H Middle East Series
Blancpain GT Series
Blancpain GT Series	(Italy) Andrea Caldarelli (Italy) Marco Mapelli	2019 Blancpain GT Series
Blancpain GT Series	Teams: (China) Orange1 FFF Racing Team	2019 Blancpain GT Series
Blancpain GT Series	Silver Cup: (Germany) Nico Bastian	2019 Blancpain GT Series
Blancpain GT Series	Silver Cup Teams: (France) AKKA ASP Team	2019 Blancpain GT Series
Blancpain GT Series	Pro-Am Cup: (Belgium) Louis Machiels; Pro-Am Cup: (Italy) Andrea Bertolini	2019 Blancpain GT Series
Blancpain GT Series	Pro-Am Cup Teams: (Italy) AF Corse	2019 Blancpain GT Series
Blancpain GT Series Endurance Cup	(Italy) Andrea Caldarelli (Italy) Marco Mapelli	2019 Blancpain GT Series Endurance Cup
Blancpain GT Series Endurance Cup	Teams: (China) Orange1 FFF Racing Team	2019 Blancpain GT Series Endurance Cup
Blancpain GT Series Endurance Cup	Silver Cup: (Germany) Nico Bastian; Silver Cup: (Russia) Timur Boguslavskiy; Silver Cup: (Brazil) Felipe Fraga	2019 Blancpain GT Series Endurance Cup
Blancpain GT Series Endurance Cup	Silver Cup Teams: (France) AKKA ASP Team	2019 Blancpain GT Series Endurance Cup
Blancpain GT Series Endurance Cup	Pro-Am Cup: (Republic of Ireland) Charlie Eastwood; Pro-Am Cup: (Oman) Ahmad Al Harthy; Pro-Am Cup: (Turkey) Salih Yoluç	2019 Blancpain GT Series Endurance Cup
Blancpain GT Series Endurance Cup	Pro-Am Cup Teams: Oman Racing with TF Sport	2019 Blancpain GT Series Endurance Cup
Blancpain GT Series Endurance Cup	Am Cup: (Russia) Leo Machitski; Am Cup: (Switzerland) Adrian Amstutz	2019 Blancpain GT Series Endurance Cup
Blancpain GT Series Endurance Cup	Am Cup Teams: (United Kingdom) Barwell Motorsport	2019 Blancpain GT Series Endurance Cup
Blancpain GT Sports Club	(Denmark) Jens Reno Møller	2019 Blancpain GT Sports Club
Blancpain GT Sports Club	Titanium Cup: (Germany) Coach McKansy	2019 Blancpain GT Sports Club
Blancpain GT Sports Club	Iron Cup: (United States) Stephen Earle	2019 Blancpain GT Sports Club
Blancpain GT World Challenge America	(Finland) Toni Vilander	2019 Blancpain GT World Challenge America
Blancpain GT World Challenge America	Teams: (United States) K-PAX Racing	2019 Blancpain GT World Challenge America
Blancpain GT World Challenge America	Manufacturers: (Italy) Ferrari	2019 Blancpain GT World Challenge America
Blancpain GT World Challenge America	Pro-Am Cup: (United States) Dane Cameron	2019 Blancpain GT World Challenge America
Blancpain GT World Challenge America	Pro-Am Cup Teams: (United States) RealTime Racing	2019 Blancpain GT World Challenge America
Blancpain GT World Challenge America	Am Cup: (Mexico) Martin Fuentes	2019 Blancpain GT World Challenge America
Blancpain GT World Challenge America	Am Cup Teams: (Italy) Squadra Corse	2019 Blancpain GT World Challenge America
Blancpain GT World Challenge Europe	(Italy) Andrea Caldarelli (Italy) Marco Mapelli	2019 Blancpain GT World Challenge Europe
Blancpain GT World Challenge Europe	Teams: (France) AKKA ASP Team	2019 Blancpain GT World Challenge Europe
Blancpain GT World Challenge Europe	Silver Cup: (Germany) Nico Bastian; Silver Cup: (France) Thomas Neubauer	2019 Blancpain GT World Challenge Europe
Blancpain GT World Challenge Europe	Silver Cup Teams: (France) AKKA ASP Team	2019 Blancpain GT World Challenge Europe
Blancpain GT World Challenge Europe	Pro-Am Cup: (Japan) Hiroshi Hamaguchi; Pro-Am Cup: (United Kingdom) Phil Keen	2019 Blancpain GT World Challenge Europe
Blancpain GT World Challenge Europe	Pro-Am Cup Teams: (China) Orange1 FFF Racing Team	2019 Blancpain GT World Challenge Europe
Blancpain GT World Challenge Europe	Am Cup: (Germany) Florian Scholze; Am Cup: (Germany) Wolfgang Triller	2019 Blancpain GT World Challenge Europe
Blancpain GT World Challenge Europe	Am Cup Teams: (Austria) HB Racing	2019 Blancpain GT World Challenge Europe
Porsche Supercup, Porsche Carrera Cup and GT3 Cup Challenge
Porsche Supercup	(Germany) Michael Ammermüller	2019 Porsche Supercup
Porsche Supercup	Teams: (Austria) BWT Lechner Racing	2019 Porsche Supercup
Porsche Carrera Cup Australia	(Australia) Jordan Love	2019 Porsche Carrera Cup Australia
Porsche Carrera Cup Australia	Pro-Am: (Australia) Liam Talbot	2019 Porsche Carrera Cup Australia
Porsche Carrera Cup Deutschland	(France) Julien Andlauer	2019 Porsche Carrera Cup Deutschland
Porsche Carrera Cup Deutschland	Teams: (Austria) BWT Lechner Racing	2019 Porsche Carrera Cup Deutschland
Porsche Carrera Cup Deutschland	Amateur: (Luxembourg) Carlos Rivas	2019 Porsche Carrera Cup Deutschland
Porsche Carrera Cup Deutschland	Rookies: (New Zealand) Jaxon Evans	2019 Porsche Carrera Cup Deutschland
Porsche Carrera Cup France	(Turkey) Ayhancan Güven	2019 Porsche Carrera Cup France
Porsche Carrera Cup France	Teams: (France) Martinet by Alméras	2019 Porsche Carrera Cup France
Porsche Carrera Cup France	Gentlemen: (France) Jérôme Boullery	2019 Porsche Carrera Cup France
Porsche Carrera Cup France	Rookies: (France) Enzo Guibbert	2019 Porsche Carrera Cup France
Porsche Carrera Cup Great Britain	(United Kingdom) Daniel Harper	2019 Porsche Carrera Cup Great Britain
Porsche Carrera Cup Great Britain	Pro-Am: (Republic of Ireland) Karl Leonard	2019 Porsche Carrera Cup Great Britain
Porsche Carrera Cup Great Britain	Am: (United Kingdom) Justin Sherwood	2019 Porsche Carrera Cup Great Britain
Porsche Carrera Cup Japan	(Japan) Ukyo Sasahara	2019 Porsche Carrera Cup Japan
Porsche Carrera Cup Japan	Team: (Japan) BINGO RACING	2019 Porsche Carrera Cup Japan
Porsche Carrera Cup Japan	Gentleman: (Japan) Tomohide Yamaguchi	2019 Porsche Carrera Cup Japan
Porsche Carrera Cup Scandinavia	(Sweden) Lukas Sundahl	2019 Porsche Carrera Cup Scandinavia
Porsche Carrera Cup Scandinavia	Approved Cup: (Sweden) Hugo Andersson	2019 Porsche Carrera Cup Scandinavia
Porsche Carrera Cup Scandinavia	Masters: (Sweden) Lars-Bertil Rantzow	2019 Porsche Carrera Cup Scandinavia
Ferrari Challenge
Finali Mondiali	Trofeo Pirelli Pro: (United Kingdom) Adam Carroll; Trofeo Pirelli Pro-Am: (Italy) Emanuele-Maria Tabacchi; Coppa Shell Pro-Am: (United States) James Weiland; Coppa Shell Am: (Sweden) Ingvar Mattsson	2019 Finali Mondiali
Ferrari Challenge Europe	Trofeo Pirelli Pro: (Italy) Louis Prette; Trofeo Pirelli Pro-Am: (Italy) Emanuele-Maria Tabacchi; Coppa Shell Pro-Am: (Lebanon) Tani Hanna; Coppa Shell Am: (Denmark) Henrik Jansen	2019 Ferrari Challenge Europe
Ferrari Challenge North America	Trofeo Pirelli Pro: (United States) Cooper MacNeil; Trofeo Pirelli Pro-Am: (United States) Neil Gehani; Coppa Shell Pro-Am: (United States) Mark Issa; Coppa Shell Am: (United States) Bradley Horstmann	2019 Ferrari Challenge North America
Ferrari Challenge Asia-Pacific	Trofeo Pirelli Pro-Am: (Italy) Philippe Prette; Coppa Shell Pro-Am: (Japan) Makoto Fujiwara; Coppa Shell Am: (South Korea) Andrew Moon	2019 Ferrari Challenge Asia-Pacific

== Stock car racing ==
Series	Champion	refer
ARCA Menards Series	(United States) Christian Eckes	2019 ARCA Menards Series
ARCA Menards Series	Teams: (United States) Venturini Motorsports	2019 ARCA Menards Series
Stock Car Brasil	(Brazil) Daniel Serra	2019 Stock Car Brasil Championship
Turismo Carretera	(Argentina) Agustín Canapino	2019 Turismo Carretera Championship
NASCAR
Monster Energy NASCAR Cup Series	(United States) Kyle Busch	2019 Monster Energy NASCAR Cup Series
Monster Energy NASCAR Cup Series	Manufacturers: (Japan) Toyota	2019 Monster Energy NASCAR Cup Series
NASCAR Xfinity Series	(United States) Tyler Reddick	2019 NASCAR Xfinity Series
NASCAR Xfinity Series	Manufacturers: (United States) Chevrolet	2019 NASCAR Xfinity Series
NASCAR Gander Outdoors Truck Series	(United States) Brett Moffitt	2019 NASCAR Gander Outdoors Truck Series
NASCAR Gander Outdoors Truck Series	Manufacturers: (Japan) Toyota	2019 NASCAR Gander Outdoors Truck Series
NASCAR K&N Pro Series East	(United States) Sam Mayer	2019 NASCAR K&N Pro Series East
NASCAR K&N Pro Series East	Manufacturers: (United States) Chevrolet	2019 NASCAR K&N Pro Series East
NASCAR K&N Pro Series West	(United States) Derek Kraus	2019 NASCAR K&N Pro Series West
NASCAR K&N Pro Series West	Manufacturers: (Japan) Toyota	2019 NASCAR K&N Pro Series West
NASCAR PEAK Mexico Series	(Mexico) Rubén García Jr.	2019 NASCAR PEAK Mexico Series
NASCAR Pinty's Series	(Canada) Andrew Ranger	2019 NASCAR Pinty's Series
NASCAR Pinty's Series	Manufacturers: (United States) Dodge	2019 NASCAR Pinty's Series
NASCAR Whelen Modified Tour	(United States) Doug Coby	2019 NASCAR Whelen Modified Tour
NASCAR Whelen Modified Tour	Manufacturers: (United States) Chevrolet	2019 NASCAR Whelen Modified Tour
NASCAR Whelen Euro Series	(Netherlands) Loris Hezemans	2019 NASCAR Whelen Euro Series
NASCAR Whelen Euro Series	Teams: (Netherlands) Hendriks Motorsport	2019 NASCAR Whelen Euro Series
NASCAR Whelen Euro Series	Elite 2: (Denmark) Lasse Sørensen	2019 NASCAR Whelen Euro Series

== Touring cars ==
Series	Champion	refer
24H TCE Continents Series	(Switzerland) Jérôme Ogay (Switzerland) Yannick Mettler	2019 24H TCE Series
24H TCE Continents Series	Teams: (Switzerland) Autorama Motorsport by Wolf-Power Racing	2019 24H TCE Series
24H TCE Continents Series	TCR: (Switzerland) Jérôme Ogay; TCR: (Switzerland) Yannick Mettler	2019 24H TCE Series
24H TCE Continents Series	TCR Teams: (Switzerland) Autorama Motorsport by Wolf-Power Racing	2019 24H TCE Series
24H TCE Europe Series	(Switzerland) Fabian Danz	2019 24H TCE Series
24H TCE Europe Series	Teams: (Switzerland) Autorama Motorsport by Wolf-Power Racing	2019 24H TCE Series
24H TCE Europe Series	TCR: (Switzerland) Fabian Danz	2019 24H TCE Series
24H TCE Europe Series	TCR Teams: (Switzerland) Autorama Motorsport by Wolf-Power Racing	2019 24H TCE Series
24H TCE Europe Series	SP3: (Netherlands) Eric van den Munckhof; SP3: (Netherlands) Marco Poland	2019 24H TCE Series
24H TCE Europe Series	SP3 Teams: (Netherlands) Munckhof Racing	2019 24H TCE Series
24H TCE Europe Series	A3: (United Kingdom) Daniel Wheeler; A3: (United Kingdom) Alyn James	2019 24H TCE Series
24H TCE Europe Series	A3 Teams: (United Kingdom) Synchro Motorsport	2019 24H TCE Series
24H TCE Europe Series	CUP1: (Austria) Martin Kroll; CUP1: (Germany) Axel Burghardt	2019 24H TCE Series
24H TCE Europe Series	CUP1 Teams: (Switzerland) Hofor Racing by Bonk Motorsport	2019 24H TCE Series
24H TCE Europe Series	A2: (Austria) Michael Winkler	2019 24H TCE Series
24H TCE Europe Series	A2 Teams: (Austria) Winkler Tuning	2019 24H TCE Series
24H TCE Europe Series	Ladies Cup: (Germany) Nicole Holzer	2019 24H TCE Series
24H TCE Europe Series	Junior Cup: (Germany) Jonas Holmgaard; Junior Cup: (Germany) Magnus Holmgaard	2019 24H TCE Series
Aussie Racing Cars	(Australia) Justin Ruggier	2019 Aussie Racing Cars
British Touring Car Championship	(United Kingdom) Colin Turkington	2019 British Touring Car Championship
British Touring Car Championship	Manufacturers: (Germany) BMW	2019 British Touring Car Championship
British Touring Car Championship	Teams: (United Kingdom) Halfords Yuasa Racing	2019 British Touring Car Championship
British Touring Car Championship	Independent: (United Kingdom) Rory Butcher	2019 British Touring Car Championship
British Touring Car Championship	Independent Teams: (United Kingdom) Cobra Sport AmD AutoAid/RCIB Insurance	2019 British Touring Car Championship
British Touring Car Championship	Jack Sears Trophy: (United Kingdom) Rory Butcher	2019 British Touring Car Championship
Deutsche Tourenwagen Masters	(Germany) Rene Rast	2019 Deutsche Tourenwagen Masters
Deutsche Tourenwagen Masters	Teams: (Germany) Audi Sport Team Rosberg	2019 Deutsche Tourenwagen Masters
Deutsche Tourenwagen Masters	Manufacturers: (Germany) Audi	2019 Deutsche Tourenwagen Masters
Global Touring Cars	(South Africa) Keagan Masters	2019 Global Touring Cars
Global Touring Cars	Manufacturers: (Germany) Volkswagen	2019 Global Touring Cars
Global Touring Cars	GTC2: (South Africa) Brad Liebenberg	2019 Global Touring Cars
Global Touring Cars	GTC2 Manufacturers: (Germany) Volkswagen	2019 Global Touring Cars
Jaguar I-Pace eTrophy	(Brazil) Sérgio Jimenez	2018–19 Jaguar I-Pace eTrophy
Jaguar I-Pace eTrophy	Pro-Am: (Saudi Arabia) Bandar Alesayi	2018–19 Jaguar I-Pace eTrophy
Mini Challenge UK	(United Kingdom) Robert Dalgliesh	2019 Mini Challenge UK
Mini Challenge UK	Open: (United Kingdom) Dan Butcher-Lloyd	2019 Mini Challenge UK
Mini Challenge UK	JCW: (United Kingdom) James Gornall	2019 Mini Challenge UK
Mini Challenge UK	Cooper Am: (United Kingdom) Lee Pearce	2019 Mini Challenge UK
NZ Touring Cars Championship	(Australia) Jack Smith	2018–19 NZ Touring Cars Championship
NZ Touring Cars Championship	Class Two: (New Zealand) Justin Ashwell	2018–19 NZ Touring Cars Championship
Renault UK Clio Cup	(United Kingdom) Jack Young	2019 Renault UK Clio Cup
Renault UK Clio Cup	Graduate Cup: (United Kingdom) Jack Young	2019 Renault UK Clio Cup
Supercars Championship	(New Zealand) Scott McLaughlin	2019 Supercars Championship
Supercars Championship	Teams: (Australia) DJR Team Penske	2019 Supercars Championship
Supercars Championship	Manufacturers: (United States) Ford	2019 Supercars Championship
Supercars Championship	Enduro Cup: (Australia) Jamie Whincup; Enduro Cup: (Australia) Craig Lowndes	2019 Supercars Championship
Super2 Series	(Australia) Bryce Fullwood	2019 Super2 Series
Super3 Series	(Australia) Broc Feeney	2019 Super3 Series
TA2 Series	(Australia) Aaron Seton	2019 TA2 Series
TA2 Asia Series	(New Zealand) Paul Manuell (Australia) Jaylyn Robotham	2019 TA2 Asia Series
Spanish Touring Car Championship	(Spain) Borja García	2019 Campeonato de España de Turismos Series
Spanish Touring Car Championship	Manufacturers: (Japan) Honda	2019 Campeonato de España de Turismos Series
Súper TC 2000	(Argentina) Leonel Pernía	2019 Súper TC 2000
Súper TC 2000	Teams: (Argentina) Renault Sport	2019 Súper TC 2000
Súper TC 2000	Manufacturers: (France) Renault	2019 Súper TC 2000
Top Race V6	(Argentina) Matías Rossi	2019 Top Race V6
Turismo Nacional	Clase 3: (Argentina) José Manuel Urcera	2019 Turismo Nacional Championship
Turismo Nacional	Clase 2: (Argentina) Ever Franetovich	2019 Turismo Nacional Championship
TCR Series
FIA World Touring Car Cup	(Hungary) Norbert Michelisz	2019 World Touring Car Cup
FIA World Touring Car Cup	Teams: (Sweden) Cyan Racing Lynk & Co	2019 World Touring Car Cup
TC America Series	(United States) Michael Hurczyn	2019 TC America Series
TC America Series	Teams: (United States) FCP Euro	2019 TC America Series
TC America Series	Manufacturers: (Germany) Volkswagen	2019 TC America Series
TC America Series	TCR DSG Cup: (United States) Brian Putt	2019 TC America Series
TC America Series	TCA: (United States) Tyler Maxson	2019 TC America Series
TC America Series	TCA Teams: (United Kingdom) MINI JCW Team	2019 TC America Series
TC America Series	TCA Manufacturers: (United Kingdom) Mini	2019 TC America Series
TC America Series	TC: (Denmark) Johan Schwartz	2019 TC America Series
TC America Series	TC Teams: (United States) Rooster Hall Racing	2019 TC America Series
TC America Series	TC Manufacturers: (Germany) BMW	2019 TC America Series
TCR Asia Series	(Germany) Luca Engstler	2019 TCR Asia Series
TCR Asia Series	Team: (Germany) Hyundai Team Engstler	2019 TCR Asia Series
TCR Australia Touring Car Series	(Australia) Will Brown	2019 TCR Australia Touring Car Series
TCR Australia Touring Car Series	Team: (Australia) HMO Customer Racing	2019 TCR Australia Touring Car Series
TCR China Touring Car Championship	(China) Huang Chu Han	2019 TCR China Touring Car Championship
TCR China Touring Car Championship	Team: (China) Liqui Moly Team NewFaster	2019 TCR China Touring Car Championship
TCR China Touring Car Championship	Manufacturers: (Japan) Honda	2019 TCR China Touring Car Championship
TCR Eastern Europe Trophy	(Serbia) Milovan Vesnić	2019 TCR Eastern Europe Trophy
TCR Eastern Europe Trophy	Team: (Serbia) ASK Vesnić	2019 TCR Eastern Europe Trophy
TCR Europe Touring Car Series	(United Kingdom) Josh Files	2019 TCR Europe Touring Car Series
TCR Europe Touring Car Series	Team: (Italy) Target Competition	2019 TCR Europe Touring Car Series
TCR Europe Touring Car Series	TCR BeNeLux: (France) Julien Briché	2019 TCR Europe Touring Car Series
TCR Europe Touring Car Series	TCR BeNeLux Teams: (France) JSB Compétition	2019 TCR Europe Touring Car Series
ADAC TCR Germany Touring Car Championship	(Germany) Max Hesse	2019 ADAC TCR Germany Touring Car Championship
ADAC TCR Germany Touring Car Championship	Team: (Germany) Hyundai Team Engstler	2019 ADAC TCR Germany Touring Car Championship
ADAC TCR Germany Touring Car Championship	Junior Cup: (Germany) Michelle Halder	2019 ADAC TCR Germany Touring Car Championship
TCR Italy Touring Car Championship	(Italy) Salvatore Tavano	2019 TCR Italy Touring Car Championship
TCR Italy Touring Car Championship	Am: (Austria) Günter Benninger	2019 TCR Italy Touring Car Championship
TCR Italy Touring Car Championship	DSG: (Italy) Eric Scalvini	2019 TCR Italy Touring Car Championship
TCR Italy Touring Car Championship	Under-25: (Italy) Matteo Greco	2019 TCR Italy Touring Car Championship
TCR Japan Touring Car Series	Saturday Series: (United Kingdom) Matthew Howson	2019 TCR Japan Touring Car Series
TCR Japan Touring Car Series	Saturday Series (Gentlemen): (Japan) Yukinori Taniguchi	2019 TCR Japan Touring Car Series
TCR Japan Touring Car Series	Sunday Series: (Japan) Takeshi Matsumoto	2019 TCR Japan Touring Car Series
TCR Japan Touring Car Series	Sunday Series (Gentlemen): (Japan) Shuji Maejima	2019 TCR Japan Touring Car Series
TCR Japan Touring Car Series	Entrants: (Hong Kong) KCMG	2019 TCR Japan Touring Car Series
TCR Malaysia Touring Car Championship	(Germany) Luca Engstler	2019 TCR Malaysia Touring Car Championship
TCR Malaysia Touring Car Championship	Team: (Germany) Liqui Moly Team Engstler	2019 TCR Malaysia Touring Car Championship
TCR Middle East Touring Car Series	(Germany) René Münnich	2019 TCR Middle East Touring Car Series
TCR Middle East Touring Car Series	Team: (Germany) ALL-INKL.COM Münnich Motorsport	2019 TCR Middle East Touring Car Series
Russian Circuit Racing Series	(Russia) Dmitry Bragin	2019 Russian Circuit Racing Series
Russian Circuit Racing Series	Team: (Russia) TAIF Motorsport	2019 Russian Circuit Racing Series
TCR Scandinavia Touring Car Championship	(Sweden) Robert Dahlgren	2019 TCR Scandinavia Touring Car Championship
TCR Scandinavia Touring Car Championship	Team: (Sweden) Brink Motorsport	2019 TCR Scandinavia Touring Car Championship
Touring Car Trophy	(United Kingdom) Henry Neal	2019 Touring Car Trophy
Touring Car Trophy	TCR UK: (United Kingdom) James Turkington	2019 Touring Car Trophy
TCR UAE Touring Car Championship	(Greece) Costas Papantonis	2018–19 TCR UAE Touring Car Championship
TCR UAE Touring Car Championship	Team: (United Arab Emirates) Mouhritsa Racing Team	2018–19 TCR UAE Touring Car Championship

== Truck racing ==
Series	Champion	refer
Copa Truck	(Brazil) Beto Monteiro	2019 Copa Truck season
FIA European Truck Racing Championship	(Germany) Jochen Hahn	2019 European Truck Racing Championship
FIA European Truck Racing Championship	Grammer Truck Cup: (United Kingdom) Oliver Janes	2019 European Truck Racing Championship
New Zealand Super Truck Championship	(New Zealand) Troy Wheeler	2019 New Zealand Super Truck Championship
New Zealand V8 Ute Racing Series	(New Zealand) Matt Spratt	2018–19 New Zealand V8 Ute Racing Series
Stadium Super Trucks	(Australia) Matthew Brabham	2019 Stadium Super Trucks
SuperUtes Series	(New Zealand) Tom Alexander	2019 SuperUtes Series

== See also ==
- List of motorsport championships
