= 2019 in motorsport =

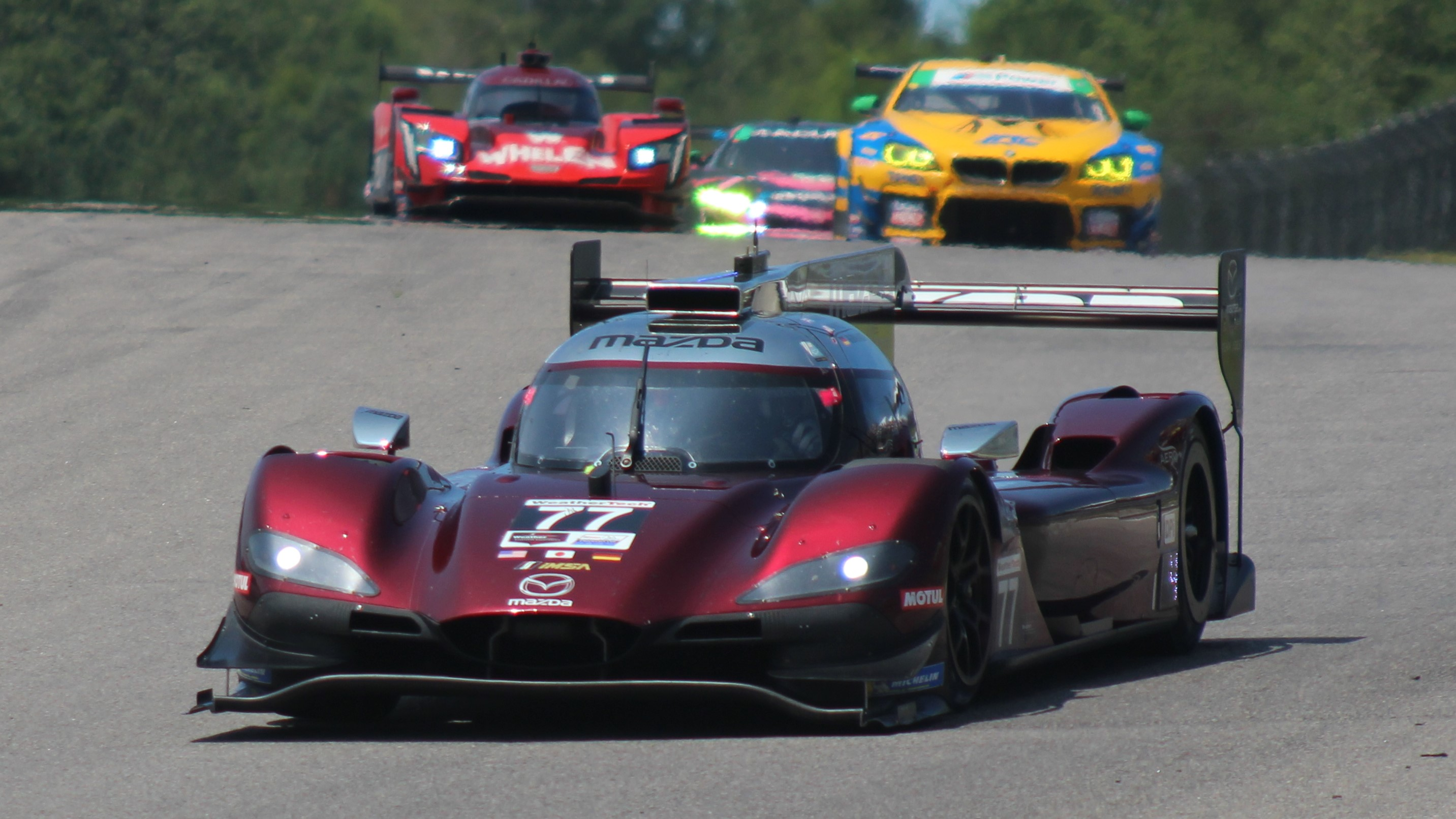
An image of racing cars or Sports Cars

The following is an overview of the events of 2019 in motorsport, including the major racing events, motorsport venues that were opened and closed during a year, championships and non-championship events that were established and disestablished in a year, and births and deaths of racing drivers and other motorsport people.

== Annual events ==
The calendar includes only annual major non-championship events or annual events that had significance separate from the championship. For the dates of the championship events see related season articles.

Date	Event	Ref
6–17 January	41st Dakar Rally	
19–20 January	30th Race of Champions	
26–27 January	57th 24 Hours of Daytona	
17 February	61st Daytona 500	
16 March	67th 12 Hours of Sebring	
16 March	78th Daytona 200	
29 April–4 May	28th Tour Auto	
22–23 April	42nd 24 Hours of Le Mans Moto	
6–11 May	103rd Scottish Six Days Trial	
26 May	77th Monaco Grand Prix	
26 May	103rd Indianapolis 500	
25 May–7 June	101st Isle of Man TT	
15–16 June	87th 24 Hours of Le Mans	
20–23 June	47th 24 Hours of Nürburgring	
30 June	97th Pikes Peak International Hill Climb	
6–7 July	27th Goodwood Festival of Speed	
12 July	112th APBA Gold Cup	
28 July	42nd Suzuka 8 Hours	
27–28 July	71st 24 Hours of Spa	
10–11 August	46th Rolex Motorsport Reunion	
26 August	59th Cowes-Torquay-Cowes	
11–15 September	53rd National Championship Air Races	
14–15 September	22nd Goodwood Revival	
18, 21 September	18th IFMAR 1:10 Electric Off-Road World Championship	
21–22 September	83rd Bol d'Or	
28–29 September	74th Motocross des Nations	
13 October	62nd Bathurst 1000	
1–2 November	23rd IFMAR 1:8 IC Track World Championship	
1–3 November	1st FIA Motorsport Games	
17 November	66th Macau Grand Prix	
11-16 November	94th International Six Days Enduro	
22–24 November	52nd Baja 1000	
22 December	34th Boat Race Grand Prix	
31 December	34th Super Star Championship	

== Established championships/events ==
First race	Championship	Ref
20 January	TCR Malaysia Touring Car Championship	
13 April	Formula Regional European Championship	
27 April	ADAC GT4 Germany	
11 May	FIA Formula 3 Championship	
18 May	TCR Australia Touring Car Series	

== Deaths ==
Date	Month	Name	Age	Nationality	Occupation	Note	Ref
24	January	Karl "Charly" Lamm	63	German	Team manager	Owner of Schnitzer Motorsport	
5	February	Robert Hubbard	75	American	Inventor	Co-inventor of HANS device	
14	March	Charlie Whiting	66	British	F1 director	Race Director, Safety Delegate, and Permanent Starter	
3	April	Brian "Dirtinator" Kinwald	45	American	R/C car racer	Double IFMAR 1:10 Electric Off-Road World Champion (1993, 1997)	
24	April	Hubert Hahne	84	German	F1 driver		
20	May	Niki Lauda	70	Austrian	F1 driver	Triple Formula One World Champion (1975, 1977, 1984)	
5	June	Robin Herd	80	British		Co-founder of March Engineering	
14	June	Rod Hall	81	American	Off-road racer		
30	June	Carlin Dunne	36	American	Motorcyclist	4 times Pikes Peak motorcycle winner	
31	July	Jean-Luc Thérier	73	French	Rally driver	5 time WRC winner	
4	August	Jean-Paul Driot	68	French	Team owner	Owner of DAMS	
27	August	Jessi Combs	39	American			
31	August	Anthoine Hubert	22	French	Racing driver	2018 GP3 Series Champion	
15	October	Andrew Cowan	82	British	Rally driver	founder/senior director of Mitsubishi Ralliart Europe	
17	November	Tuka Rocha	36	Brazilian	Racing driver	Stock Car Brasil driver	
20	December	Robert "Junior" Johnson	88	American	Racing driver and team owner	6 time NASCAR championship team owner	

== See also ==
- List of 2019 motorsport champions
