= FIA Central European Zone Formula 3 =

Open wheel racing series

- Category: Single-seaters
- Country: Europe
- Inaugural season: 1994
- Constructors: Dallara
- Drivers' champion: (Germany) Dr. Ralph Pütz
- Official website: http://www.cez-motorsport.com/

The FIA Central European Zone Formula 3 is an open wheel racing series based in Central and Eastern Europe. The series has been running since 1994 under Formula Libre rules as a sub class of the FIA Central European Circuit Racing series, primarily featuring older Formula Three cars and engines. Notable regular circuits include the Formula 1 circuits of Hungaroring and Red Bull Ring.

According to article 23-B-4 of the FIA World Council Statutes (for Karting the CIK/FIA), a Central European Zone has been established. Members of this zone are: Albania, Austria, Bosnia and Herzegovina, Croatia, Czech Republic, Hungary, Italy, Macedonia, Montenegro, Poland, Serbia, Slovenia and Slovakia.

== Champions ==
Season	Formula 3 Champion	Team & Car/Engine
1994	(Czech Republic) Tomas Karhanek	WTS - TKF Racing - Dallara F393-Opel
1995	(Poland) Jaroslaw Wierczuk	GPF Motorsport - Dallara F393-Fiat
1996	(Czech Republic) Jaroslav Kostelecky	Chemopetrol Ring Racing Team - Dallara F394-Mugen-Honda
1997	(Czech Republic) Petr Krizan	(Austria) Franz Wöss Racing - Dallara F393-Opel
1998	(Germany) Andrè Fibier	(Austria) Franz Wöss Racing - Dallara F395-Opel
1999	(Germany) Andrè Fibier	(Austria) Franz Wöss Racing - Dallara F397-Opel
2000	(Italy) Fulvio Cavicchi	Azeta Sava Olimpija - Dallara F397-Opel
2001	(Czech Republic) Jaroslav Kostelecky	(Czech Republic) Czech National Team - Dallara F399-Opel
2002	(Austria) Richard Lietz	(Austria) Palfinger F3 Racing Team - Dallara F300-Opel
2003	(Italy) Diego Romanini	(Germany) JMS Jenichen Motorsport - Dallara F399-Opel
2004	(Austria) Andreas Zuber	(Germany) Penker Racing - Dallara F303-Opel
2005	(Belgium) Michael Herck	(Belgium) Junior Racing Team - Dallara F305-Opel
2006-2015	Not held	
2016	(Italy) Paolo Brajnik	(Italy) 212 Racing - Dallara F308-VW Spiess
2017	(Italy) Andrea Cola	(Italy) Monolite Racing - Dallara F312-Mercedes
2018	(Italy) Andrea Cola	(Italy) Monolite Racing - Dallara F312-Mercedes
2019	(Czech Republic) Tom Beckhäuser	(Austria) Franz Wöss Racing - Dallara F308-Opel Spiess
2020	(Germany) Ralph Pütz	(Austria) Franz Wöss Racing - Dallara F305-Opel Spiess
2021	(Austria) Stefan Fürtbauer	(Austria) Franz Wöss Racing - Dallara F316
2022	(Hungary) Benjámin Berta	(Austria) Team Hoffmann Racing - Dallara F314-Toyota
2023	(Hungary) Benjámin Berta	(Hungary) Solution Racing SE - Dallara F316
2024	(Hungary) Benjámin Berta	(Austria) Franz Wöss Racing - Dallara 320
2025	(Hungary) Benjámin Berta	(Austria) Franz Wöss Racing - Dallara 320

== See also ==
- Formula Three
