= Andrea Cola =

Italian racing driver

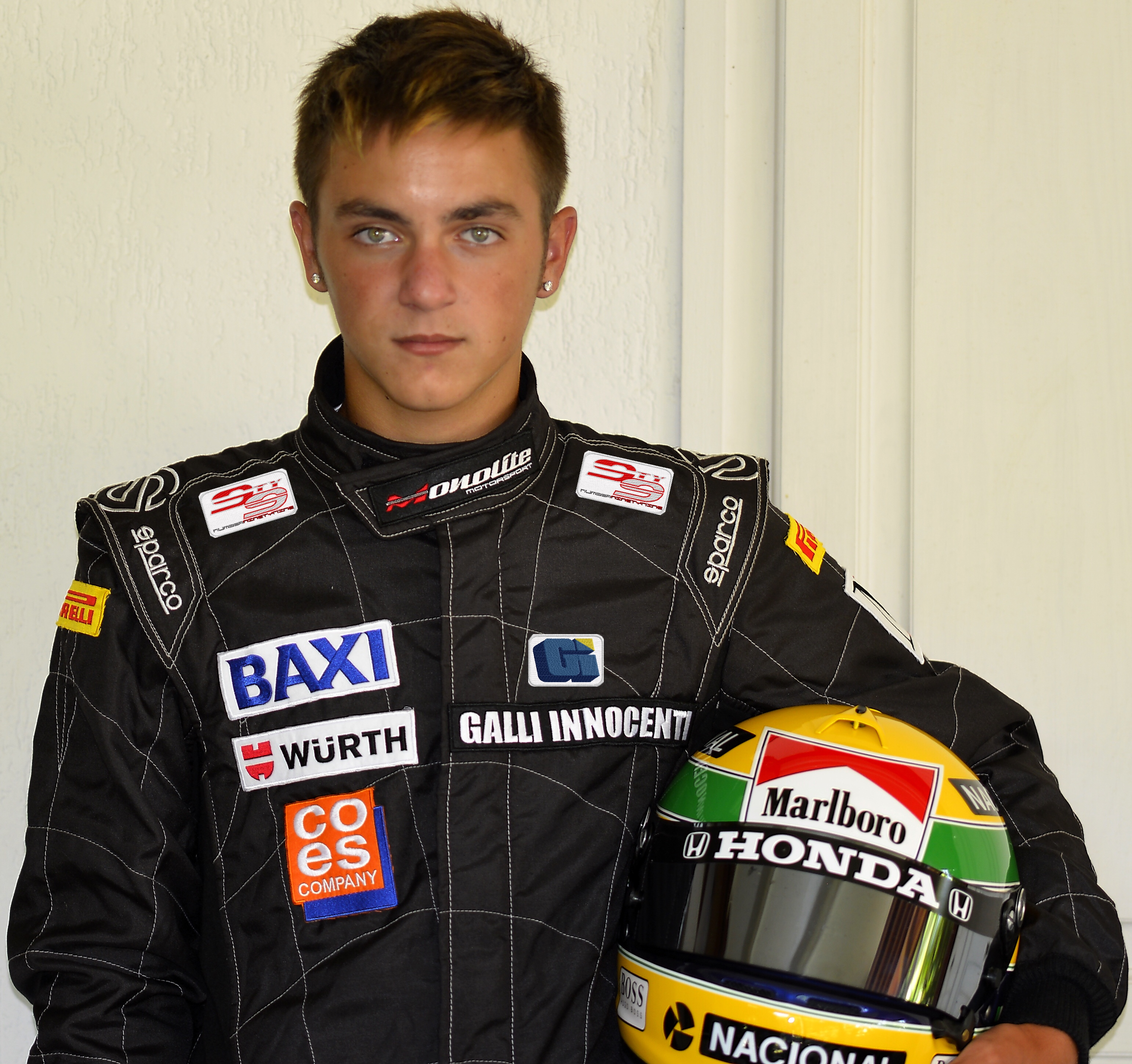
- Andrea Cola in 2018
- Nationality: Italy
- Born: 9 June 1999 (age 27) Rome, Italy

Lamborghini Super Trofeo Europe career
- Debut season: 2021
- Current team: Target Racing
- Categorisation: FIA Silver
- Car number: 99
- Starts: 4
- Wins: 1
- Poles: 0
- Fastest laps: 0

Previous series
- 2020 2019 2017-18: FR European Championship; Drexler-Automotive Formula 3 Cup; Remus F3 Cup

Andrea Cola (Italian pronunciation: [anˈdrɛːa ˈkɔːla]; born 9 June 1999 in Rome) is an Italian racing driver currently competing in the Lamborghini Super Trofeo Europe for Target Racing.

== Career ==
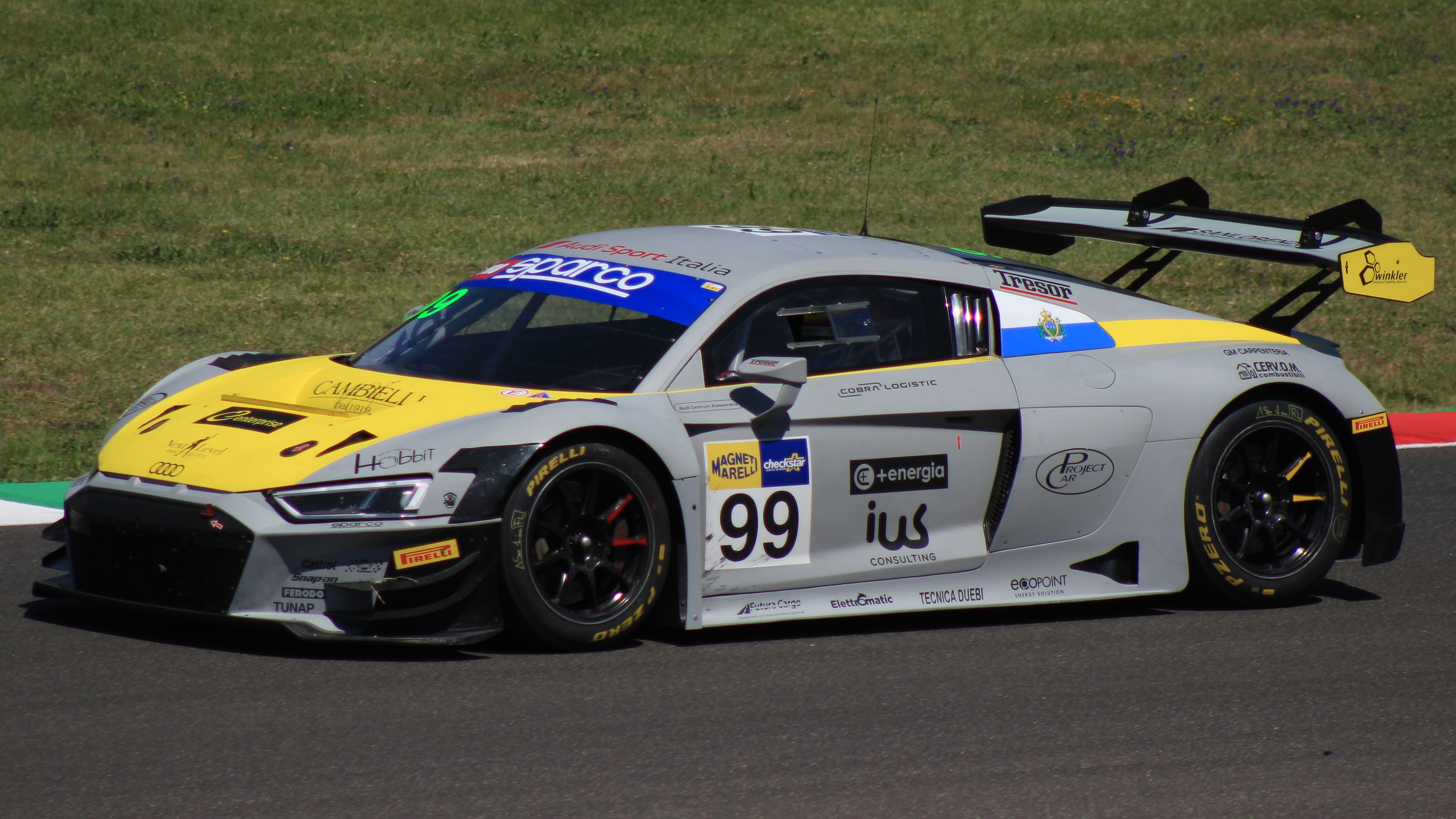
Andrea Cola in 2024

=== Karting ===
Cola began racing in 2009, when he was ten years-old, practicing on karting. After gaining experience in the Italian Championship Regione Lazio in the 60 cc category in 2009 and 2010, he took part in the Italian Championship Regione Lazio 125 cc category junior in 2011 and 2012. In the 2012 championship, he ranked second.

=== Single-seater racing ===
In June 2016, Cola had his debut on F. Abarth in the F2 Italian Trophy with Monolite Racing (in the middle of the championship) at the Misano World Circuit getting the first place of his class in both races. He ranked second in the final standings of his class.

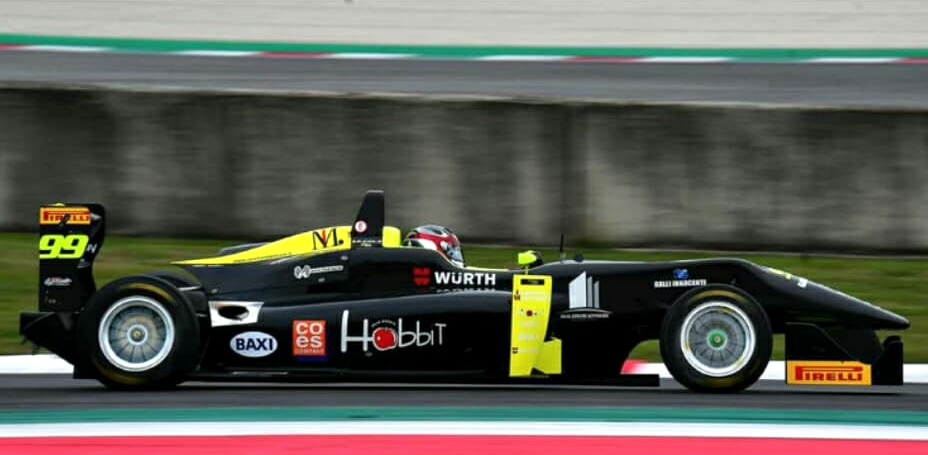
Andrea Cola on the F312 Dallara-Mercedes in 2017

On 1 April 2017, Cola debuted in Formula 3 driving a F312 Dallara-Mercedes again on the Misano World Circuit. He retired in the last corner while he was second during Race 1 and ranked third in Race 2.

In 2017, Cola raced also in the Austria Formula 3 Cup, Afr Pokale and FIA CEZ Formula 3 championships. His first win in Formula 3 came in Race 2 on the Red Bull Ring circuit in Spielberg, Austria. Thanks to the good standings in the last two races on the Brno Circuit, he won the FIA CEZ Formula 3 Championship 2017.

In 2018, Cola raced in the FIA CEZ Formula 3 Championship again. He ranked first in his category in the first two races of the season at the Hungaroring on 28 and 29 April. At the Red Bull Ring circuit, the second round of the season, he ranked third in Race 1 and second in Race 2, behind Jo Zeller Racing driver Sandro Zeller who won both races. Cola managed to win the 2018 Championship by scoring 154.5 points, 27 more than Paolo Brajnik, while another Italian racer, Ricardo Perego, got the third place.

In 2019, Cola returned to the FIA CEZ Formula 3 Championship, on his F312 Dallara now motorized Volkswagen.

== Racing record ==
=== Career summary ===
Season	Series	Team	Races	Wins	Poles	F/Laps	Podiums	Points	Position
2017	Remus F3 Cup	Monolite Racing	8	1	1	0	5	107	5th
2017	FIA Central European Zone Formula 3	Monolite Racing	?	?	?	?	?	?	**1st**
2018	Remus F3 Cup	Monolite Racing	14	1	0	0	5	160	**2nd**
2018	FIA Central European Zone Formula 3	Monolite Racing	8	5	?	?	8	154.5	**1st**
2019	Drexler-Automotive Formula 3 Cup	Monolite Racing	15	2	0	4	10	229	**2nd**
2019	FIA Central European Zone Formula 3	Monolite Racing	10	0	?	?	10	129	**2nd**
2019	F2000 Italian Formula Trophy	Monolite Racing	?	?	?	?	?	?	**1st**
2020	Formula Regional European Championship	Monolite Racing	15	0	0	0	0	26	14th
2021	Lamborghini Super Trofeo Europe - Pro-Am	Target Racing	10	3	2	?	5	87	4th
2022	Italian GT Endurance Championship - GT3	Vincenzo Sospiri Racing	4	0	0	0	0	16	6th
2022	Italian GT Endurance Championship - GT3 Pro-Am	Vincenzo Sospiri Racing	4	1	0	0	3	47	**1st**
2022	GT World Challenge Europe Endurance Cup	Vincenzo Sospiri Racing	1	0	0	0	0	0	NC
2022	GT World Challenge Europe Endurance Cup - Silver Cup	Vincenzo Sospiri Racing	1	0	0	0	0	0	NC
2023	GT World Challenge Europe Endurance Cup	Boutsen VDS Racing	5	0	0	0	0	0	NC
2023	GT World Challenge Europe Endurance Cup - Silver Cup	Boutsen VDS Racing	5	0	0	0	0	39	7th
2024	Italian GT Sprint Championship - GT3	Tresor Audi Sport Italia	8	0	0	0	2	34	9th
2024	Italian GT Endurance Championship - GT3	Tresor Audi Sport Italia	4	0	0	0	1	31	8th
2024	GT World Challenge Europe Endurance Cup	Tresor Attempto Racing	1	0	0	0	0	0	NC
2025	Italian GT Championship Endurance Cup - GT3	Audi Sport Italia	3	0	0	0	1	26	9th
2026	Italian GT Championship Endurance Cup - GT3	Imperiale Racing	4	0	0	0	0	18	12th

* Season still in progress.

=== Complete GT World Challenge results ===
==== GT World Challenge Europe Endurance Cup ====
(Races in bold indicate pole position) (Races in italics indicate fastest lap)

Year	Team	Car	Class	1	2	3	4	5	6	7	Pos.	Points
2022	Vincenzo Sospiri Racing	Lamborghini Huracán GT3 Evo	Silver	IMO	LEC	SPA; 6H	SPA; 12H	SPA; 24H	HOC	CAT; 24	NC	0
2023	Boutsen VDS	Audi R8 LMS Evo II	Silver	MNZ; 33	LEC; 21	SPA; 6H; 41	SPA; 12H; 63	SPA; 24H; Ret	NÜR; 38	CAT; Ret	7th	39

^{*}Season still in progress.
