= 2019 FIM Women's Motocross World Championship =

Motocross championship season

The 2019 FIM Women's Motocross World Championship was the 15th Women's Motocross World Championship season. Kiara Fontanesi was the defending champion, after taking her sixth title in 2018. Yamaha was the defending Manufacturing champion.

== 2019 Calendar ==
A 5-round calendar for the 2019 season was announced on 25 October 2018.

Round	Date	Grand Prix	Location	Race 1 Winner	Race 2 Winner	Round Winner	Report
1	March 31	Netherlands	Valkenswaard	(New Zealand) Courtney Duncan	(Netherlands) Nancy Van De Ven	(Belgium) Amandine Verstappen	Report
2	May 19	Portugal	Agueda	(New Zealand) Courtney Duncan	(New Zealand) Courtney Duncan	(New Zealand) Courtney Duncan	Report
3	July 28	Czech Republic	Loket	(New Zealand) Courtney Duncan	(New Zealand) Courtney Duncan	(New Zealand) Courtney Duncan	Report
4	August 18	Italy	Imola	(New Zealand) Courtney Duncan	(New Zealand) Courtney Duncan	(New Zealand) Courtney Duncan	Report
5	September 8	Turkey	Afyonkarahisar	(New Zealand) Courtney Duncan	(New Zealand) Courtney Duncan	(New Zealand) Courtney Duncan	Report

== Participants ==
Team	Constructor	No	Rider	Rounds
Kawasaki Sweden Team Green	Kawasaki	2	(Sweden) Sandra Karlsson	3–4
Team Lakerveld Racing	KTM	5	(Netherlands) Britt Jans-Beken	1, 3
Team Lakerveld Racing	KTM	125	(Netherlands) Amber Simons	1, 3
Team Dragon Motos	KTM	9	(Switzerland) Virginie Germond	1–2, 5
Cepelak Racing Team	Yamaha	10	(Czech Republic) Kristyna Vitkova	3
Team VHR KTM Racing	KTM	14	(France) Mathilde Martinez	1–2
Kawasaki Elf Team Oetke	Kawasaki	18	(Germany) Katharina Schultz	1, 3
Team ADS-MXN	Yamaha	21	(Netherlands) Kaylee van Dam	1
VM Racing	Husqvarna	22	(Norway) Vilde Marie Holt	1
	Kawasaki	27	(Sweden) Ida Djärf Björklund	1
Team Defraine	Yamaha	30	(Belgium) Brenda Wagemans	1, 3
DIGA WMX Racing	KTM	36	(United States) Avrie Berry	1–4
DIGA WMX Racing	KTM	625	(Australia) Tahlia O'Hare	1–3
Team Eisenbach Tresore Yamaha	Yamaha	40	(Germany) Alicia Reitze	3–4
	Husqvarna	42	(Belgium) Britt Van Muylem	1
A1M Husqvarna	Husqvarna	46	(Estonia) Kadri Ehamäe	2
Motoland Amiens	Yamaha	52	(France) Justine Charroux	1–4
KMP Honda Racing	Honda	55	(Germany) Kim Irmgartz	1–3
Bud Racing Kawasaki	Kawasaki	66	(Australia) Meghan Rutledge	1
Laurense Motors	Husqvarna	67	(Netherlands) Britt Van Der Werff	1–4
Team Ecomaxx Fuels	KTM	71	(Netherlands) Demi Verploegh	1–4
RFME MX Women's Team	Kawasaki	79	(Spain) Gabriela Seisdedos	3
RFME MX Women's Team	Honda	108	(Spain) Miriam Mena	4
RFME MX Women's Team	KTM	346	(Spain) Sara Coloret	3–4
No Fear Yamaha	Yamaha	85	(Netherlands) Nancy Van De Ven	All
Team SK Racing	Kawasaki	90	(Switzerland) Sandra Keller	1–3
Team AC171	Yamaha	99	(France) Manon Haudoire	2–4
Team AC171	Yamaha	203	(France) Camille Viaud	1–4
	KTM	100	(Netherlands) Eline Burgmans	1–3
Suzuki Reinecke	Suzuki	111	(Germany) Anne Borchers	All
MX Factory Shop	Yamaha	114	(Italy) Gaia Franchi	4
Ceres 71 Racing	Suzuki	116	(Italy) Francesca Nocera	1, 3–4
Ceres 71 Racing	Yamaha	121	(Italy) Elisa Galvagno	1, 3–5
Allcon	KTM	118	(Austria) Vanessa Umschaden	3–4
Team Petriglia Racing	KTM	120	(Italy) Beatrice Cimarra	4
	Honda	131	(Denmark) Line Dam	All
	Husqvarna	136	(Netherlands) Cynthia Swets	1
RFX KTM Racing	KTM	138	(United Kingdom) Kathryn Booth	1
	Husqvarna	143	(Netherlands) Stephanie Stoutjesdijk	1–4
Twenty Suspension	Suzuki	146	(Germany) Lisa Michels	1–4
Bike It DRT Kawasaki	Kawasaki	151	(New Zealand) Courtney Duncan	All
I-Fly JK Racing Yamaha	Yamaha	172	(Netherlands) Lynn Valk	All
	KTM	188	(Netherlands) Shana van der Vlist	All
Orion Racing Team	Suzuki	221	(Czech Republic) Barbora Lankova	3
Jaas Racing	KTM	237	(Germany) Celine Abel	3
Yamaha Europe	Yamaha	274	(Belgium) Amandine Verstappen	All
	Yamaha	290	(France) Mathilde Denis	1–4
Flex-Box	KTM	325	(Denmark) Sara Andersen	All
Jetmar Husqvarna	Husqvarna	364	(Portugal) Joana Gonçalves	2
Team Made of Race Service	Honda	421	(Italy) Matilde Stilo	3–4
MXFontaRacing Syneco	Yamaha	423	(Germany) Larissa Papenmeier	All
MX Academy	Honda	437	(France) Lisa Guerber	3–4
Yamaha Motor Scandinavia	Yamaha	555	(Sweden) Emelie Dahl	3–4
Stordspeedshop	Yamaha	612	(Norway) Mathea Selebø	3
	Honda	827	(Japan) Juri Hatao	1–4
Nine Six Four	Yamaha	964	(Netherlands) Nicky van Wordragen	1–3
	Suzuki	974	(Germany) Janina Lehmann	1–2
	Honda	987	(Italy) Erica Lago	4

Points are awarded to finishers of the main races, in the following format:

Position	1st	2nd	3rd	4th	5th	6th	7th	8th	9th	10th	11th	12th	13th	14th	15th	16th	17th	18th	19th	20th
Points	25	22	20	18	16	15	14	13	12	11	10	9	8	7	6	5	4	3	2	1

=== Riders Championship ===
Pos	Rider	Bike	NED (Netherlands)		POR (Portugal)		CZE (Czech Republic)		ITA (Italy)		TUR (Turkey)		Points
1	(New Zealand) Duncan	Kawasaki	1	7	1	1	1	1	1	1	1	1	239
2	(Netherlands) Van De Ven	Yamaha	4	1	3	2	2	4	3	4	3	3	203
3	(Germany) Papenmeier	Yamaha	3	3	2	3	4	2	2	2	8	5	195
4	(Belgium) Verstappen	Yamaha	2	2	10	9	8	3	6	3	4	4	171
5	(Denmark) Andersen	KTM	6	27	5	4	3	15	4	5	2	2	153
6	(Netherlands) van der Vlist	KTM	5	4	7	8	5	5	7	6	6	6	152
7	(Netherlands) Valk	Yamaha	7	6	4	5	9	6	5	7	7	8	147
8	(Denmark) Dam	Honda	11	5	8	6	6	Ret	Ret	9	5	7	111
9	(Germany) Borchers	Suzuki	10	15	9	13	7	8	14	10	9	9	106
10	(Netherlands) van Wordragen	Yamaha	8	9	6	7	10	Ret					65
11	(Netherlands) Van Der Werff	Husqvarna	DNS	DNS	14	10	12	11	10	12			57
12	(Switzerland) Germond	KTM	13	11	19	16					10	11	46
13	(Sweden) Karlsson	Kawasaki					14	9	8	11			42
14	(Italy) Nocera	Suzuki	29	21			13	7	9	15			40
15	(France) Denis	Yamaha	16	13	13	Ret	21	16	Ret	14			33
16	(United States) Berry	KTM	12	16	16	20	32	17	16	19			31
17	(Italy) Galvagno	Yamaha	DNS	DNS			22	25	17	16	11	10	30
18	(Switzerland) Keller	Kawasaki	17	14	22	12	28	12					29
19	(Australia) Rutledge	Kawasaki	9	8									25
20	(France) Charroux	Yamaha	32	18	18	19	18	22	15	13			25
21	(Sweden) Dahl	Yamaha					Ret	DNS	11	8			23
22	(Australia) O'Hare	KTM	14	12	17	18	Ret	DNS					23
23	(Norway) Selebø	Yamaha					11	10					21
24	(Germany) Reitze	Yamaha					15	14	13	21			21
25	(Japan) Hatao	Honda	21	31	15	14	34	19	20	17			20
26	(France) Martinez	KTM	15	10	Ret	DNS							17
27	(Netherlands) Stoutjesdijk	Husqvarna	27	30	20	21	16	20	12	24			16
28	(Portugal) Gonçalves	Husqvarna			12	15							15
29	(Germany) Lehmann	Suzuki	26	32	11	17							14
30	(Belgium) Wagemans	Yamaha	25	19			17	13					14
31	(Germany) Michels	Suzuki	33	28	Ret	11	25	27	30	Ret			10
32	(Netherlands) Simons	KTM	18	20			31	18					7
33	(France) Guerber	Honda					19	29	18	20			6
34	(Netherlands) Jans-Beken	KTM	20	17			23	21					5
35	(France) Haudoire	Yamaha			24	24	30	31	19	18			5
36	(Germany) Irmgartz	Honda	19	24	21	22	DNQ	26					2
37	(Spain) Seisdedos	Kawasaki					20	Ret					1
	(Austria) Umschaden	KTM					33	33	21	23			0
	(Netherlands) Verploegh	KTM	22	22	Ret	DNS	35	30	29	26			0
	(Spain) Coloret	KTM					27	28	23	22			0
	(Italy) Franchi	Yamaha							22	28			0
	(France) Viaud	Yamaha	34	36	23	23	26	32	24	27			0
	(Sweden) Djärf Björklund	Kawasaki	23	23									0
	(Netherlands) Burgmans	KTM	DNS	DNS	25	26	24	23					0
	(Netherlands) Swets	Husqvarna	24	25									0
	(Czech Republic) Lankova	Suzuki					29	24					0
	(Spain) Mena	Honda							25	25			0
	(Estonia) Ehamäe	Husqvarna			26	25							0
	(United Kingdom) Booth	KTM	28	26									0
	(Italy) Stilo	Honda					Ret	DNS	26	30			0
	(Italy) Cimarra	KTM							27	29			0
	(Italy) Lago	Honda							28	31			0
	(Norway) Holt	Husqvarna	31	29									0
	(Belgium) Van Muylem	Husqvarna	30	35									0
	(Netherlands) van Dam	Yamaha	35	33									0
	(Germany) Schultz	Kawasaki	36	34			DNQ	DNS					0
	(Germany) Abel	KTM					36	34					0
	(Czech Republic) Vitkova	Yamaha					Ret	DNS					0
Pos	Rider	Bike	NED (Netherlands)		POR (Portugal)		CZE (Czech Republic)		ITA (Italy)		TUR (Turkey)		Points

=== Manufacturers Championship ===
Pos	Bike	NED (Netherlands)		POR (Portugal)		CZE (Czech Republic)		ITA (Italy)		TUR (Turkey)		Points
1	Kawasaki	1	7	1	1	1	1	1	1	1	1	239
2	Yamaha	2	1	2	2	2	2	2	2	3	3	219
3	KTM	5	4	5	4	3	5	4	5	2	2	182
4	Honda	11	5	8	6	6	19	18	9	5	7	116
5	Suzuki	10	15	9	11	7	7	9	10	9	9	114
6	Husqvarna	24	25	12	10	12	11	10	12			59
Pos	Bike	NED (Netherlands)		POR (Portugal)		CZE (Czech Republic)		ITA (Italy)		TUR (Turkey)		Points
