= 2019 D1NZ season =

Premier drifting series of New Zealand

The 2019 D1NZ season was the sixteenth D1NZ series; the premier drifting series of New Zealand. The season began at Trustpower Baypark Stadium on January 12 and concluded at Manfeild: Circuit Chris Amon on April 27. Darren Kelly won the main championship, whilst Michael Thorley won the Pro-Sport class.

== Teams and drivers ==
=== Pro Series ===
Manufacturer	Vehicle	Team	No	Driver	Rounds
BMW	BMW M3 (E46)	DDT Racing	93	(New Zealand) Daynom Templeman	All
Ford	Ford Mustang (S550)	FDC Motorsport	7	(New Zealand) Daniel Woolhouse	All
Ford	Shelby Mustang (S-197)	Rattla Motorsport	30	(New Zealand) Shane Allen	1–3
Ford	Ford Falcon (BF)	Rattla Motorsport	30	(New Zealand) Shane Allen	4
Mazda	Mazda RX-7 (FC)	Andrew Redward Racing	24	(New Zealand) Andrew Redward	All
Mazda	Mazda RX-7 (FC)	JC Drift	32	(New Zealand) Jordy Cole	All
Nissan	Nissan 180SX	Davies Steedman Racing	14	(New Zealand) Adam Davies	All
Nissan	Nissan 350Z	Brad Smith Racing	231	(New Zealand) Brad Smith	1
Nissan	Nissan Laurel (C33)	Euphoric Motorsport	13	(New Zealand) Vincent Langhorn	All
Nissan	Nissan Silvia (S13)	Davies Steedman Racing	5	(New Zealand) David Steedman	2–5
Nissan	Nissan Silvia (S13)	07 Drift	11	(New Zealand) Jason Brown	1–2, 4
Nissan	Nissan Silvia (S13)	Stuart Baker Drift	21	(New Zealand) Stuart Baker	2–5
Nissan	Nissan Silvia (S13)	LBP Drift	31	(New Zealand) Liam Burke	All
Nissan	Nissan Silvia (S13)	Mag and Turbo Motorsport	123	(New Zealand) Bruce Tannock	All
Nissan	Nissan Silvia (S14)	Olivecrona Drift Motorsport	12	(New Zealand) Jaron Olivecrona	All
Nissan	Nissan Silvia (S15)	4mance Automotive	4	(Australia) Matty Hill	All
Nissan	Nissan Silvia (S15)	Wilkinson Motorsport	6	(New Zealand) Ben Wilkinson	All
Nissan	Nissan Silvia (S15)	Jerry Zhu Drift	19	(New Zealand) Jerry Zhu	All
Nissan	Nissan Silvia (S15)	Jesse Greensdale Drift	87	(New Zealand) Jesse Greensdale	All
Nissan	Nissan Silvia (S15)	Marsh Motorsport	666	(New Zealand) Carl Thompson	All
Nissan	Nissan Skyline GT-R (R32)	Gagan Kang	33	(New Zealand) Gagan Kang	All
Nissan	Nissan Skyline GT-R (R34)	Cole Armstrong Drift	1	(New Zealand) Cole Armstrong	All
Nissan	Nissan GT-R (R35)	Nissan New Zealand	2	(New Zealand) Darren Kelly	All
Toyota	Toyota AE86	Joel Paterson Drift	36	(New Zealand) Joel Paterson	2–3
Toyota	Toyota GT86	Team Jenkins Motorsport	856	(New Zealand) Troy Jenkins	All
Toyota	Toyota GT86	Team Jenkins Motorsport	857	(New Zealand) Ben Jenkins	All
Toyota	Toyota Supra (A80)	Team DMNZ	747	(New Zealand) Drew Donovan	1–2
Toyota	Toyota Supra (A80)	Team DMNZ	777	(New Zealand) Jodie Donovan	1–2

=== Pro-Sport ===
Manufacturer	Vehicle	Team	No	Driver	Rounds
Mazda	Mazda RX-7 (FC)	Adam Camplin Drift	888	(New Zealand) Adam Camplin	1–4
Mazda	Mazda RX-7 (FD)	R&M Motorsport	25	(New Zealand) Russell Vare	1–4
Nissan	Nissan 180SX	J R Coombes Drift	11	(New Zealand) Jared Coombes	1
Nissan	Nissan 180SX	James Wynyard Drift	18	(New Zealand) James Wynyard	1–2
Nissan	Nissan 180SX	R & M Motorsport	30	(New Zealand) Matthew Brown	1–4
Nissan	Nissan Cefiro (A31)	AW Drift	21	(New Zealand) Adam Whitehead	1–4
Nissan	Nissan Cefiro (A31)	Hayman Motorsport	34	(New Zealand) Eddie Hayman	3–4
Nissan	Nissan Laurel (C33)	Custom Drift	17	(New Zealand) Michael Thorley	1–4
Nissan	Nissan Laurel (C33)	Team 33	23	(New Zealand) Andy Donoghue	1–4
Nissan	Nissan Laurel (C33)	Team Thirty3	713	(New Zealand) David Hunter	1–3
Nissan	Nissan Silvia (S13)	Team Chow		(New Zealand) Jamie Carr	4
Nissan	Nissan Silvia (S13)	Team 13	13	(New Zealand) Scott Dinsdale	4
Nissan	Nissan Silvia (S13)	Calvin Clark Drift	15	(New Zealand) Calvin Clark	1
Nissan	Nissan Silvia (S13)	Choice Drift	27	(New Zealand) Charlie Bound-Walsh	1–4
Nissan	Nissan Silvia (S13)	RB Motorsport	29	(New Zealand) Rowan Bainbridge	1–3
Nissan	Nissan Silvia (S13)	Jordan Joyce Drift	333	(New Zealand) Jordan Joyce	1–3
Nissan	Nissan Silvia (S14)	Central Drift Team	3	(New Zealand) Taylor James	1–4
Nissan	Nissan Silvia (S14)	Aaron Hyatt Drift	28	(New Zealand) Aaron Hyatt	1–3
Nissan	Nissan Silvia (S14)	Choice Drift	719	(New Zealand) Shaun Potroz	1–4
Nissan	Nissan Silvia (S15)	TP BOYS	22	(New Zealand) Alex Griffin	1–4
Nissan	Nissan Silvia (S15)	Precision Roofing	24	(New Zealand) Atlan Norman	1–4
Nissan	Nissan Skyline GT-R (R32)	Kurt Blackie Drift	99	(New Zealand) Kurt Blackie	1–4

== Calendar ==
Round	Circuit	Location	Date	Pro Winner	Pro-Sport Winner
1	Trustpower Baypark Stadium	Mount Maunganui, Bay of Plenty	January 12-13	(New Zealand) Darren Kelly	(New Zealand) Michael Thorley
2	Wellington Family Speedway	Upper Hutt, Wellington Region	February 15-16	(New Zealand) Ben Jenkins	(New Zealand) Shaun Potroz
3	Hampton Downs Motorsport Park	Hampton Downs, North Waikato	March 16-17	(New Zealand) Darren Kelly	(New Zealand) Jordyn Joyce
4	Pukekohe Park Raceway	Pukekohe, Auckland Region	March 30-31	(New Zealand) Daniel Woolhouse	(New Zealand) Michael Thorley
5	Manfeild: Circuit Chris Amon	Feilding, Manawatū District	April 26-27	(New Zealand) Darren Kelly	(New Zealand) Michael Thorley

== Championship standings ==
=== Pro ===
Pos	Driver	Vehicle	BOP	WEL	HAM	PUK	MAN	Pts
1	(New Zealand) Darren Kelly	Nissan GT-R (R35)	1	10				138
2	(New Zealand) Adam Davies	Nissan 180SX	8	3				125
3	(New Zealand) Ben Jenkins	Toyota GT86	19	1				123
4	(New Zealand) Andrew Redward	Mazda RX-7 (FC)	13	2				120
5	(New Zealand) Daniel Woolhouse	Ford Mustang (S550)	6	5				107
6	(Australia) Matthew Hill	Nissan Silvia (S15)	3	11				105
7	(New Zealand) David Steedman	Nissan Silvia (S13)	4	9				102
8	(New Zealand) Daynom Templeman	BMW M3 (E46)	2	17				102
9	(New Zealand) Cole Armstrong	Nissan Skyline GT-R (R34)	12	4				99
10	(New Zealand) Carl Thompson	Nissan Silvia (S15)	9	6				92
11	(New Zealand) Ben Wilkinson	Nissan Silvia (S15)	17	7				71
12	(New Zealand) Liam Burke	Nissan Silvia (S13)	18	8				71
13	(New Zealand) Jason Brown	Nissan Silvia (S13)	7	18				70
14	(New Zealand) Stuart Baker	Nissan Silvia (S13)	14	12				70
15	(New Zealand) Jordy Cole	Mazda RX-7 (FC)	11	20				54
16	(New Zealand) Drew Donovan	Toyota Supra (A80)	5					53
17	(New Zealand) Jaron Olivecrona	Nissan Silvia (S14)	21	13				53
18	(New Zealand) Jerry Zhu	Nissan Silvia (S15)	22	14				53
19	(New Zealand) Vincent Langhorn	Nissan Laurel (C33)	20	15				52
20	(New Zealand) Troy Jenkins	Toyota GT86	23	16				52
21	(New Zealand) Gagan Kang	Nissan Skyline GT-R (R32)	16	22				52
22	(New Zealand) Bruce Tannock	Nissan Silvia (S13)	24	19				36
23	(New Zealand) Joel Paterson	Toyota AE86	10	23				36
24	(New Zealand) Jodie Donovan	Toyota Supra (A80)	15					34
25	(New Zealand) Jesse Greensdale	Nissan Silvia (S15)	26	21				20
26	(New Zealand) Shane Allen	Shelby Mustang (S-197)	25					2
Pos	Driver	Vehicle	BOP	WEL	HAM	PUK	MAN	Pts
