= 2019 Drexler-Automotive Formula 3 Cup =

Motor racing competition

The 2019 Drexler-Automotive Formula 3 Cup was the 38th Austria Formula 3 Cup season and the first Drexler-Automotive Formula 3 Cup season.

== Teams and drivers ==
All Cup cars were built between 2008 and 2012, while Trophy cars were built between 1992 and 2007.

Team	Chassis	Engine	No.	Driver	Class	Rounds
(Italy) Facondini Racing	Dallara F308	Fiat-FPT	2	(Italy) Lattanzi Ginpaolo	C	3
(Switzerland) Jo Zeller Racing	Dallara F306	Mercedes	2	(Switzerland) Urs Rüttimann	T	2, 5-6
(Switzerland) Jo Zeller Racing	Dallara F308	Mercedes	3	(Switzerland) Marcel Tobler	C	2–7
(Switzerland) Jo Zeller Racing	Dallara F308	Mercedes	44	(Switzerland) Sandro Zeller	C	All
(Switzerland) Jo Zeller Racing	Dallara F306	Volkswagen-Spiess	81	(Switzerland) Florian Münger	T	All
(Italy) Puresport	Dallara F308	Fiat-FPT	4	(Italy) Paolo Vagaggini	C	3
(Italy) Puresport	Dallara F308	Fiat-FPT	5	(Italy) Enrico Milani	C	3
(Italy) Puresport	Dallara F310	Volkswagen-Spiess	8	(Italy) Dino Rasero	C	1–3, 5-7
(Austria) Franz Wöss Racing	Dallara F306	Volkswagen-Spiess	6	(Italy) Luca Iannaccone	T	All
(Austria) Franz Wöss Racing	Dallara F306	Volkswagen-Spiess	6	(Switzerland) Thomas Aregger	T	4
(Austria) Franz Wöss Racing	Dallara F308	Mugen-Honda	10	(Greece) Daniel Tapinos	C	1–4
(Austria) Franz Wöss Racing	Dallara F309	Volkswagen-Spiess	11	(Switzerland) Kurt Böhlen	C	1–6
(Austria) Franz Wöss Racing	Dallara F308	Fiat-FPT	24	(Germany) Christian Wachter	C	1
(Austria) Franz Wöss Racing	Dallara F305	Opel-Spiess	61	(Germany) Dr. Ralph Pütz	T	All
(Austria) Franz Wöss Racing	Dallara F308	Opel-Spiess	95	(Czech Republic) Tom Beckhäuser	C	2–7
(Germany) Christian Zeller	Dallara F308	Mercedes	7	(Germany) Christian Zeller	C	2
(Austria) LS Performance	Dallara F305	Opel-Spiess	9	(Austria) Manfred Lang	T	2, 6
(Switzerland) GForce Racing	Dallara F312	Mercedes	16	(Switzerland) Antoine Bottiroli	C	All
(Republic of Ireland) VS-Racing	Dallara F304	Toyota	19	(Republic of Ireland) Tim Buckley	T	3, 5
(Italy) Team One Motorsport	Dallara F312	Volkswagen	21	(Italy) Alessandro Bracalente	C	3
(Italy) Team One Motorsport	Dallara F308	Fiat-FPT	23	(Italy) Federico Porri	C	3
(Germany) Philipp Regensperger	Dallara F305	Opel-Spiess	33	(Germany) Philipp Regensperger	C	2
(Italy) Riccardo Perego	Dallara F308	Fiat-FPT	46	(Italy) Riccardo Perego	C	3
(Italy) HT Powertrain	Dallara F308	Toyota	51	(Italy) Bernardo Pellegrini	C	3
(Hungary) F-Racing 2000 kft	Dallara F313	Toyota	53	(Hungary) Robert Hefler	C	7
(Austria) Renauer Motorsport	Dallara F308	Opel-Spiess	70	(Austria) Josef Halwachs	C	2
(France) Jean-Luc Neri	Dallara F311	Fiat-FPT	78	(France) Jean-Luc Neri	C	2
(Italy) Monolite Racing	Dallara F312	Mercedes	99	(Italy) Andrea Cola	C	1–2, 6
(Italy) Monolite Racing	Dallara F312	Volkswagen-Spiess	99	(Italy) Andrea Cola	C	3–5, 7
(Italy) Scuderia Antonino	Dallara F311	Volkswagen-Spiess	777	(Italy) Antonino Pellegrino	C	3, 5
(Hungary) Magyar Racing Team	Dallara F397	Opel-Spiess	999	(Hungary) Atilla Pénzes	T	2

== Calendar & Race results ==
A provisional calendar was released in early 2019.

R.	RN	Circuit	Date	Pole position	Fastest lap	Winning driver	Winning team	Trophy winner
1	1	(Italy) Autodromo Nazionale Monza, Monza	6 April	(Switzerland) Sandro Zeller	(Switzerland) Antoine Bottiroli	(Switzerland) Sandro Zeller	(Switzerland) Jo Zeller Racing	(Switzerland) Florian Münger
1	2	(Italy) Autodromo Nazionale Monza, Monza	7 April	(Switzerland) Antoine Bottiroli	(Switzerland) Antoine Bottiroli	(Switzerland) Sandro Zeller	(Switzerland) Jo Zeller Racing	(Italy) Luca Iannaccone
2	1	(Austria) Red Bull Ring, Spielberg	18 May	(Italy) Alessio Deledda	(Italy) Andrea Cola	(Switzerland) Sandro Zeller	(Switzerland) Jo Zeller Racing	(Switzerland) Urs Rüttimann
2	2	(Austria) Red Bull Ring, Spielberg	19 May	(Italy) Andrea Cola	(Czech Republic) Tom Beckhäuser	(Czech Republic) Tom Beckhäuser	(Austria) Franz Wöss Racing	(Switzerland) Urs Rüttimann
3	1	(Italy) Autodromo Enzo e Dino Ferrari, Imola	22 June	(Switzerland) Sandro Zeller	(Switzerland) Sandro Zeller	(Switzerland) Sandro Zeller	(Switzerland) Jo Zeller Racing	(Italy) Luca Iannaccone
3	2	(Italy) Autodromo Enzo e Dino Ferrari, Imola	23 June	(Switzerland) Sandro Zeller	(Italy) Andrea Cola	(Switzerland) Sandro Zeller	(Switzerland) Jo Zeller Racing	(Switzerland) Florian Münger
4	1	(Czech Republic) Autodrom Most, Most	29 June	(Switzerland) Sandro Zeller	(Czech Republic) Tom Beckhäuser	(Switzerland) Sandro Zeller	(Switzerland) Jo Zeller Racing	(Switzerland) Thomas Aregger
4	2	(Czech Republic) Autodrom Most, Most	30 June	(Switzerland) Sandro Zeller	(Switzerland) Sandro Zeller	(Switzerland) Sandro Zeller	(Switzerland) Jo Zeller Racing	(Switzerland) Florian Münger
5	1	(Italy) Mugello Circuit, Scarperia e San Piero	20 July	(Czech Republic) Tom Beckhäuser	(Czech Republic) Tom Beckhäuser	(Switzerland) Sandro Zeller	(Switzerland) Jo Zeller Racing	(Switzerland) Urs Rüttimann
5	2	(Italy) Mugello Circuit, Scarperia e San Piero	21 July	(Italy) Andrea Cola	(Switzerland) Sandro Zeller	(Italy) Andrea Cola	(Italy) Monolite Racing	(Switzerland) Urs Rüttimann
6	1	(Czech Republic) Brno Circuit, Brno	7 September		(Czech Republic) Tom Beckhäuser	(Czech Republic) Tom Beckhäuser	(Austria) Franz Wöss Racing	(Austria) Manfred Lang
6	2	(Czech Republic) Brno Circuit, Brno	8 September		(Switzerland) Sandro Zeller	(Switzerland) Sandro Zeller	(Switzerland) Jo Zeller Racing	(Switzerland) Urs Rüttimann
7	1	(Hungary) Hungaroring, Mogyoród	5 October		(Czech Republic) Tom Beckhäuser	(Czech Republic) Tom Beckhäuser	(Austria) Franz Wöss Racing	(Switzerland) Florian Münger
7	2	(Hungary) Hungaroring, Mogyoród	6 October		(Czech Republic) Tom Beckhäuser	(Czech Republic) Tom Beckhäuser	(Austria) Franz Wöss Racing	(Italy) Luca Iannaccone
7	3	(Hungary) Hungaroring, Mogyoród	6 October		(Italy) Andrea Cola	(Italy) Andrea Cola	(Italy) Monolite Racing	(Switzerland) Florian Münger

== Championship standings ==
Position	1st	2nd	3rd	4th	5th	6th	7th	8th	9th	10th
Main	25	18	15	12	10	8	6	4	2	1
Trophies	12.5	9	7.5	6	5	4	3	2	1	0.5

Standings for all competitions are shown below.

=== Drexler-Automotive Formula 3 Cup ===
Pos	Driver	MON (Italy)		RBR (Austria)		IMO (Italy)		MOS (Czech Republic)		MUG (Italy)		BRN (Czech Republic)		HUN (Hungary)			Pts
1	(Switzerland) Sandro Zeller	**1**	1	**1**	2	**1**	1	1	**1**	1	12	3	**1**	3	3	5	298
2	(Italy) Andrea Cola	5	3	5	4	3	2	3	3	3	1	6	5	2	2	1	229
3	(Czech Republic) Tom Beckhäuser			Ret	1	11	3	**2**	8	**4**	4	**1**	2	1	1	4	191
4	(Switzerland) Antoine Bottiroli	2	**2**	2	Ret	2	4	4	2	6	2	4	4	4	4	DNP	188
5	(Switzerland) Marcel Tobler			3	3	5	5	6	4	7	6	5	3	5	6	3	142
6	(Switzerland) Kurt Böhlen	3	4	4	5	4	6			5	5	2	6				115
7	(Italy) Dino Rasero	4	8	DSQ	Ret	6	7			2	3	7	Ret	Ret	7	DNS	75
8	(Switzerland) Florian Münger	8	9	12	11	9	9	7	5	10	8	12	9	6	9	6	51
9	(Italy) Luca Iannaccone	Ret	6	11	8	8	Ret	DNP	6	11	9	11	11	7	8	7	42
10	(Hungary) Robert Hefler													9	5	2	30
11	(Switzerland) Urs Rüttimann			8	7					8	7	9	7				28
12	(Greece) Daniel Tapinos	7	5	9	Ret	7	Ret										24
13	(Germany) Dr. Ralph Pütz	9	10	13	12	10	Ret	8	7	12	11	10	10	8	Ret	8	24
14	(Germany) Christian Wachter	6	7														14
15	(Austria) Josef Halwachs			7	6												14
16	(Switzerland) Thomas Aregger							5	DNP								10
17	(Austria) Manfred Lang			Ret	10							8	8				9
18	(Germany) Christian Zeller			6	DNP												8
19	(Republic of Ireland) Tim Buckley					Ret	8			13	10						3
20	(Hungary) Atilla Pénzes			10	9												3
21	(Switzerland) Antonino Pellegrino									9	Ret						2
Pos	Driver	MON (Italy)		RBR (Austria)		IMO (Italy)		MOS (Czech Republic)		MUG (Italy)		BRN (Czech Republic)		HUN (Hungary)			Pts

Colour	Result
Gold	Winner
Silver	Second place
Bronze	Third place
Green	Points classification
Blue	Non-points classification
Blue	Non-classified finish (NC)
Purple	Retired, not classified (Ret)
Red	Did not qualify (DNQ)
Red	Did not pre-qualify (DNPQ)
Black	Disqualified (DSQ)
White	Did not start (DNS)
White	Withdrew (WD)
White	Race cancelled (C)
Blank	Did not practice (DNP)
Blank	Did not arrive (DNA)
Blank	Excluded (EX)

**Bold** – Pole
Italics – Fastest Lap

=== Drexler-Automotive Formula 3 Trophy ===
Pos	Driver	MON (Italy)		RBR (Austria)		IMO (Italy)		MOS (Czech Republic)		MUG (Italy)		BRN (Czech Republic)		HUN (Hungary)			Pts
1	(Switzerland) Florian Münger	8	9	12	11	9	9	7	5	10	8	12	9	6	9	6	163.5
2	(Italy) Luca Iannaccone	Ret	6	11	8	8	Ret	DNP	6	11	9	11	11	7	8	7	134.5
3	(Switzerland) Urs Rüttimann			8	7					8	7	9	7				118
4	(Germany) Dr. Ralph Pütz	9	10	13	12	10	Ret	8	7	12	11	10	10	8	Ret	8	111
5	(Austria) Manfred Lang			Ret	10							8	8				55
6	(Hungary) Atilla Pénzes			10	9												33
7	(Switzerland) Thomas Aregger							7	DNP								12.5
Pos	Driver	MON (Italy)		RBR (Austria)		IMO (Italy)		MOS (Czech Republic)		MUG (Italy)		BRN (Czech Republic)		HUN (Hungary)			Pts

=== RAVENOL Formula 3 Cup ===
Pos	Driver	MON (Italy)		RBR (Austria)		IMO (Italy)		MOS (Czech Republic)		GRB (Croatia)		BRN (Czech Republic)		HUN (Hungary)		Pts
1	(Germany) Dr. Ralph Pütz	9	10	9	10	10	Ret	8	7	6	DNP	10	10	8	Ret	247
2	(Germany) Christian Wachter	6	7													50
3	(Germany) Christian Zeller			6	DNP											25
4	(Germany) Dr. Ulrich Drechsler									5	DNP					25
5	(Germany) Philipp Regensperger															0
6	(Germany) Jörg Sandek															0
Pos	Driver	MON (Italy)		RBR (Austria)		IMO (Italy)		MOS (Czech Republic)		GRB (Croatia)		BRN (Czech Republic)		HUN (Hungary)		Pts

=== Swiss Formula 3 Cup ===
Pos	Driver	MON (Italy)		RBR (Austria)		IMO (Italy)		MOS (Czech Republic)		MUG (Italy)		BRN (Czech Republic)		HUN (Hungary)		Pts
1	(Switzerland) Sandro Zeller	1	1	1	2	1	1	1	1	1	12	3	1	3	3	326
2	(Switzerland) Antoine Bottiroli	2	2	2	Ret	2	4	4	2	6	2	4	4	4	4	232
3	(Switzerland) Marcel Tobler			3	3	5	5	6	4	7	6	5	3	5	6	174
4	(Switzerland) Kurt Böhlen	3	4	4	5	4	6			5	5	2	6			157
5	(Switzerland) Florian Münger	8	9	12	11	9	9	7	5	10	8	12	9	6	9	140
6	(Switzerland) Urs Rüttimann			8	7					8	7	9	7			64
7	(Switzerland) Thomas Aregger							5	DNP							15
8	(Switzerland) Antonino Pellegrino									9	Ret					8
Pos	Driver	MON (Italy)		RBR (Austria)		IMO (Italy)		MOS (Czech Republic)		MUG (Italy)		BRN (Czech Republic)		HUN (Hungary)		Pts
