= Women in motorsport =

Women are active participants in all forms of motor racing. Pictured: 2026 F1 Academy Zandvoort Feature Race podium.

Women have occupied various roles in auto racing throughout its history, contributing as drivers, team and vehicle owners, mechanics and engineers, sponsors, and media personnel. Female participation in motorsport has historically been limited due to perceptions around gender stereotypes such as ability and physicality compared to their male counterparts, despite initiatives (historical and ongoing) to counter this. A 2023 study estimated that women account for only 10% of participants across all motorsport competition categories, representing approximately 13% of competitors in karting and 7% in open-wheel and GT racing.

== Pre-World War II ==
The first recorded motor races involving women took place in Francophone Europe in the late 1890s. An event called the Championnat des Chauffeuses (lit. 'Women Drivers' Championship') was held at the Longchamp Racecourse in Paris in 1897, featuring eight female drivers from a theatrical background competing in various head-to-head heats on motorised tricycles; costume designer Léa Lemoine won all three iterations of this event on a De Dion-engined Clément. The first female participant of a car race was a Madame Labrousse, who raced a three-seater Panhard in the Brussels-Namur-Spa stage race over 1–2 July 1899 and finished third in class in a time of 8 hours, 30 minutes and 29 seconds.

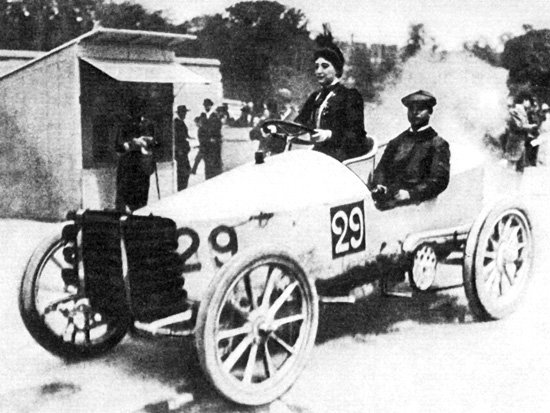
Camille du Gast aboard her De Dietrich in the 1903 Paris–Madrid.

At the turn of the century, with the Automobile Club of France (ACF) organising Grandes Épreuves like the Paris–Berlin and Paris–Vienna, socialite Camille du Gast, Baroness Hélène de Zuylen, and the aristocratic Anne de Rochechouart de Mortemart used their political connections to compete in the early great road races; however, du Gast's career was briefly derailed by the La Femme au Masque scandal in 1902. Following the 1903 Paris–Madrid in which multiple fatalities occurred, the ACF barred women from racing cars, citing the danger involved and "feminine nervousness".

Across the English Channel, secretary Dorothy Levitt was introduced to motoring by S.F. Edge – a renowned driver with an eye for publicity – and immediately won the 1903 Southport Speed Trial, a development which shocked Edwardian high society. She went on to win medals at various speed trials in the British Isles and on the European continent throughout the 1900s, set and re-set women's world speed records, and wrote a book for would-be female motorists. The Brooklands circuit had initially forbidden women drivers (arguing that there were no women jockeys, either), relenting in 1908 when it hosted the Ladies' Bracelet Handicap, a women-only motor race won by Scot Muriel Thompson aboard her brother's Austin.

Joan Newton Cuneo was the first woman to participate in a motor race on the American continent when she was reluctantly accepted into the 1905 Glidden Tour; despite a collision with a competitor that ultimately put her out of the race, she was praised by the media for her resilience and this publicity launched her career. Newton Cuneo contested track races, gymkhanas and speed trials, earning a medal for a perfect score in the 1908 Glidden Tour and finishing second to Ralph DePalma in a fifty-mile race at the New Orleans Fairgrounds in 1909. Following the New Orleans races, the American Automobile Association banned women from its competitions, ending Newton Cuneo's career.

During World War I, many women had driven ambulances, taxis, or military vehicles, and when peace returned there was a small boom of women racers across various disciplines and in both mixed-gender and female-only competitions. The Brooklands circuit continued to segregate its events, with the likes of Jill Scott and Violette Cordery challenging for speed and distance records – Cordery was twice awarded the Dewar Trophy, in 1926 and 1929, for "meritorious performance or test furthering the interests and advancement of the automobile industry." Eliška Junková became a household name in her native Czechoslovakia through successes in hillclimb events, and both she and Maria Antonietta Avanzo were among the first women to participate in the Targa Florio. Best known as a tennis player, three-time Wimbledon finalist Lilí Álvarez won the 1924 Catalonian Automobile Championship at 19 years of age. Canadian Kay Petre raced in a handful of non-championship Grands Prix in 1937, finishing sixth in the Grosvenor Grand Prix in South Africa.

== Open-wheel racing ==
=== Formula One ===
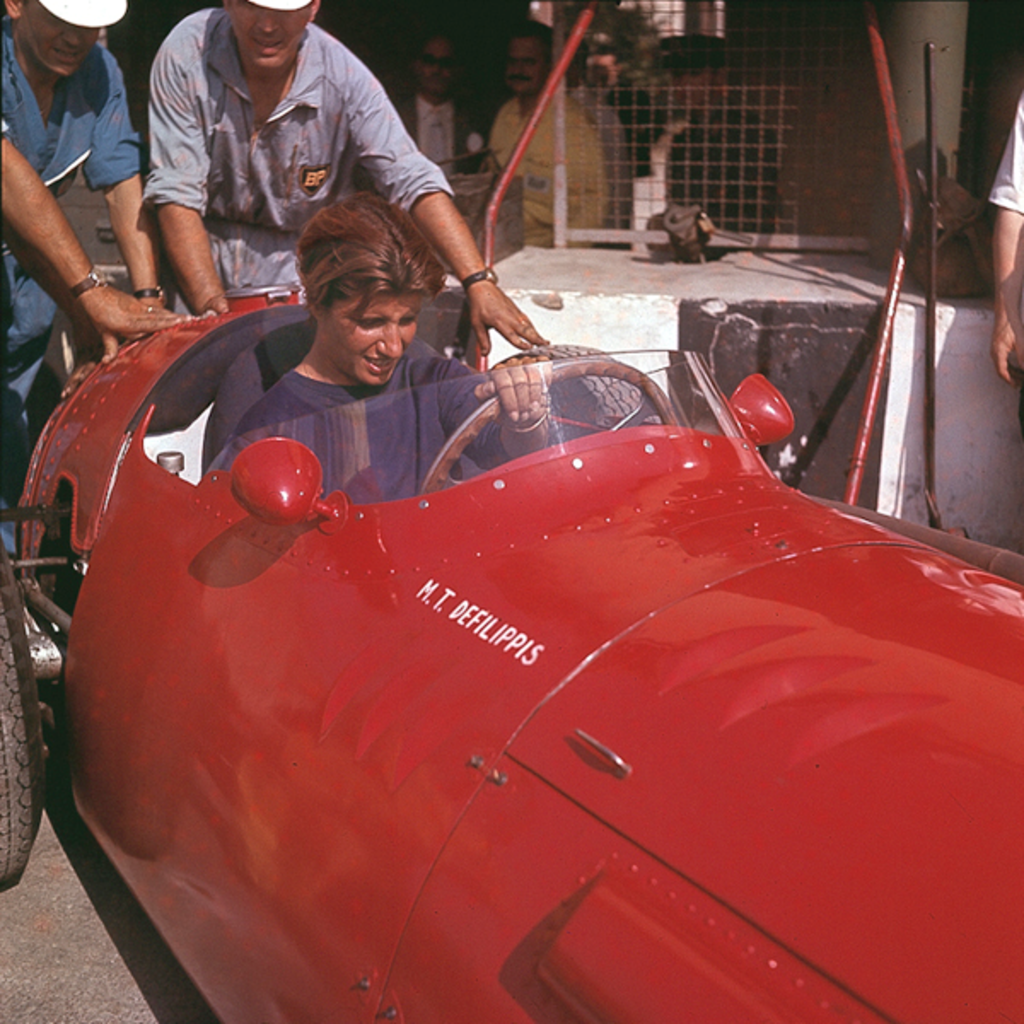
Maria Teresa de Filippis competing in the 1958 Italian Grand Prix.

"Although women have never been officially prohibited from competing in Formula 1, there have been fewer than 10 female drivers since its inception," notes scholar Olivia R. Howe. As of 2026, five women have either qualified or attempted to qualify for a World Championship Formula One Grand Prix. Maria Teresa de Filippis was the first, entering six Grands Prix in the 1958 season; one of these was the non-championship Syracuse Grand Prix, where she finished 5th, as well as the French Grand Prix where the race director barred her from competing, claiming, "the only helmet a woman should wear is the one at the hairdresser's." De Filippis finished just one World Championship race, the 1958 Belgian Grand Prix in tenth place and two laps down, and did not complete the two races she entered in 1959 before walking away from the sport after Jean Behra's fatal crash at AVUS.

Italian Lella Lombardi has the most World Championship Grand Prix appearances of any driver, entering 17 events between 1974 and 1976. She is the only female driver to score points in a World Championship Formula One race, finishing sixth in the truncated 1975 Spanish Grand Prix.

Three women have entered World Championship Formula One races with the intention of racing, but did not qualify. Olympic skier Divina Galica made three attempts to qualify for Grands Prix in the late-1970s, as did Giovanna Amati for Brabham in the first three races of the 1992 season. South African driver Desiré Wilson also failed to qualify for her only World Championship outing at Brands Hatch in 1980, but earlier that same year won a round of the British Formula One Championship at the same venue in a Wolf WR4.

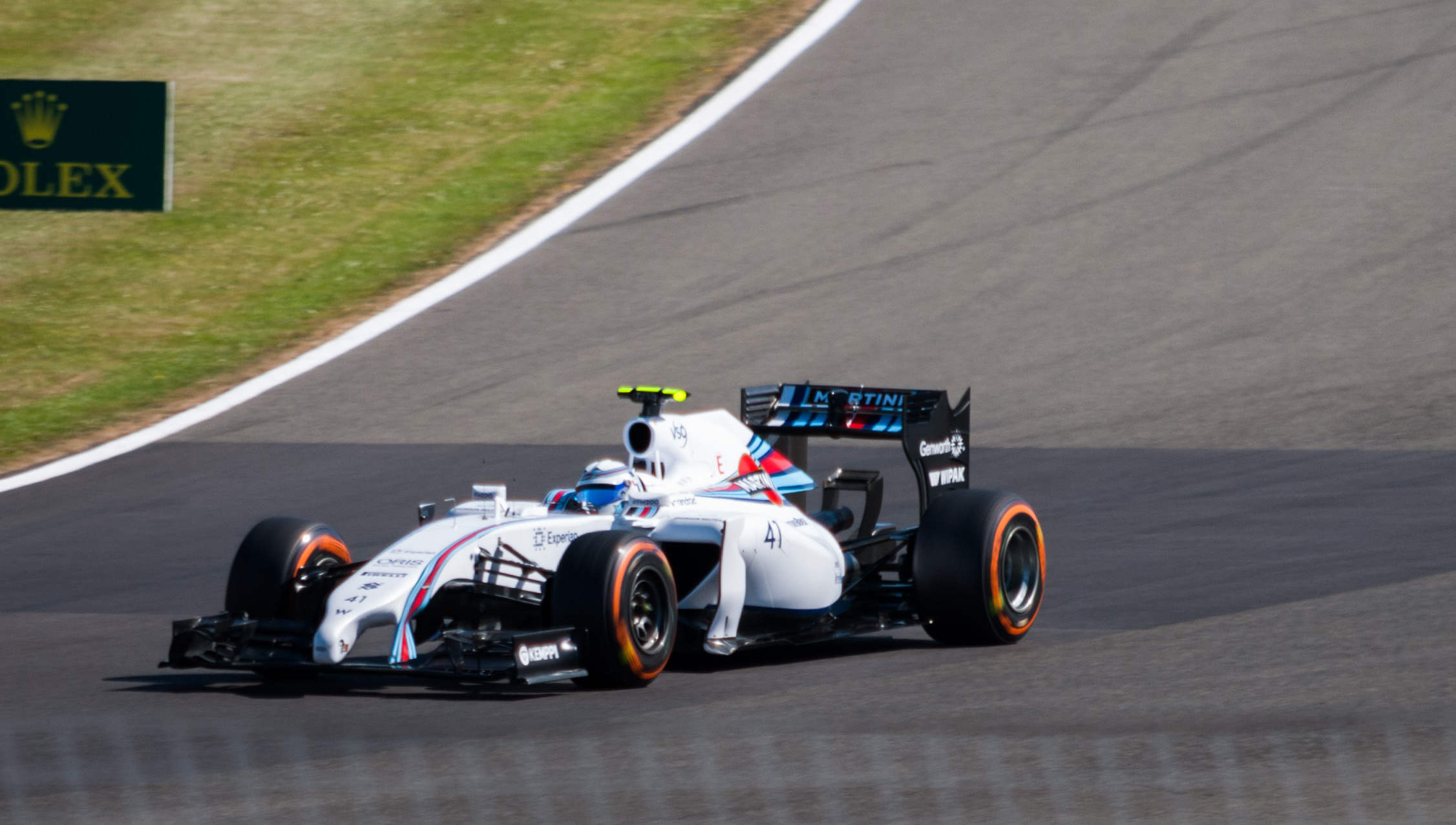
Susie Wolff driving a Williams FW36 in free practice for the 2014 British Grand Prix.

Alongside these five, various women have driven Formula One cars in official sessions or private tests. The most prolific of these is Susie Wolff, who drove in official practice for Williams in four Grands Prix across the 2014 and 2015 seasons. Other women to have tested Formula One cars include, but are not limited to, Katherine Legge with Minardi in 2005, Tatiana Calderón for Sauber in 2018 and Doriane Pin with Mercedes in 2026. María de Villota conducted straight-line testing of a Marussia MR01 in 2012, but crashed into a stationary truck at the end of a run and suffered serious head and facial injuries; the Spaniard died 15 months later from a cardiac arrest that was a consequence of neurological injuries sustained in the accident.

Various women have additionally held roles within teams, both on the management side as well as being crew members. In 2010, Monisha Kaltenborn was appointed CEO of Sauber having spent a decade as a shareholder and lawyer for the team; she was later promoted to team principal following founder Peter Sauber's departure in 2012, becoming Formula One's first female team principal, a role she held until her own departure in 2017. Claire Williams became deputy team principal and day-to-day operator of her father's eponymous team in 2013 after working as a press officer and marketing director – she held the role until Williams was sold after the 2020 Italian Grand Prix. Hannah Schmitz has won multiple championships with Red Bull as their head of race strategy, whilst Laura Müller became Formula One's first female chief race engineer in 2025 when Haas assigned her to Esteban Ocon's car. Other women to have held significant engineering roles at Formula One constructors include, but are not limited to, Ruth Buscombe, Bernadette Collins and Krystina Emmanouilides.

=== American open-wheel racing ===
Prior to the 1970s, women were excluded from the American open-wheel paddock in a professional capacity; despite this, two women entered cars in the 1929 Indianapolis 500. Maude A. Yagle purchased a Miller 8 with the help of her wealthy husband Edward and hired Ray Keech to compete in the 1929 AAA Championship Car season – Keech went on to win the race, making Yagle the first and (as of 2026) only female car owner to win the Indy 500, however Yagle could only watch the success from the grandstand. Marion Batten, widow of former driver Norman Batten, also entered a Fengler for Wesley Crawford; Battens' entry was classified fifteenth after cycling through four different relief drivers and suffering carburetor problems.

In 1971, the ban on women in the paddock was lifted through the efforts of journalist Denise McCluggage. Janet Guthrie became the first female driver to participate in a USAC Championship Car race in 1976 when she was classified fifteenth in the Trenton 200, and subsequently became the first woman to qualify for the Indianapolis 500 a year later. Guthrie also went on to finish fifth in the final race of the 1979 USAC season at Milwaukee. In the 1990s, Lyn St. James was a regular entrant at Indianapolis and made sporadic appearances in both CART and IndyCar, finishing inside the top-ten at Walt Disney World Speedway in 1996.

Danica Patrick is the only woman to have won a race in the IndyCar Series.

Female participation on both sides of "the split" accelerated in the early-2000s. Sarah Fisher was a regular participant in the Indy Racing League throughout the 2000s, scoring two podiums for Walker Racing at Kentucky Speedway and Homestead–Miami; she later became an owner–driver before moving full-time into team management in 2011. Danica Patrick made an immediate impact on debut in 2005, finishing fourth in her first Indianapolis 500 having led multiple laps – she then went on to win the 2008 Indy Japan 300, the last race before reunification, the only top-class American open-wheel race win for a female driver as of 2026. Katherine Legge meanwhile contested multiple seasons on the Champ Car side of the divide, leading laps at the Milwaukee Mile but also walking away from a serious crash at Road America.

The years following reunification marked a boom period for women in IndyCar. A record five women entered the 2010 Indianapolis 500; Fisher, Patrick, Simona de Silvestro, Milka Duno and Ana Beatriz de Figueiredo, with De Silvestro being awarded Rookie of the Year. This was followed by all four drivers entered in the centennial race – Patrick, De Silvestro, De Figueiredo and Pippa Mann – qualifying for the race, a feat repeated in 2013 (De Figueiredo, De Silvestro, Legge and Mann). De Silvestro scored four top-five finishes during her IndyCar tenure, including a second-place at Houston in 2013. After 2013, participation levels dropped with only one female driver starting subsequent Indy 500s, and none participating in the 2020 and 2025 races; De Silvestro and Tatiana Calderón did however make select starts in the 2022 IndyCar Series, the Swiss' coming through former Dodge Motorsport director Beth Parettas' short-lived program.

Angela Ashmore won the 2022 Indianapolis 500 as Marcus Ericsson's data engineer, becoming the first female crew member to win the race.

Three women have won races in the Indy Lights feeder series – De Figueiredo at Nashville Superspeedway in 2008 and Iowa Speedway in 2009, Mann at Kentucky Speedway in 2010 and Jamie Chadwick at Road America in 2024. Legge and De Silvestro also won races of the Atlantic Championship.

=== Japanese open-wheel racing ===
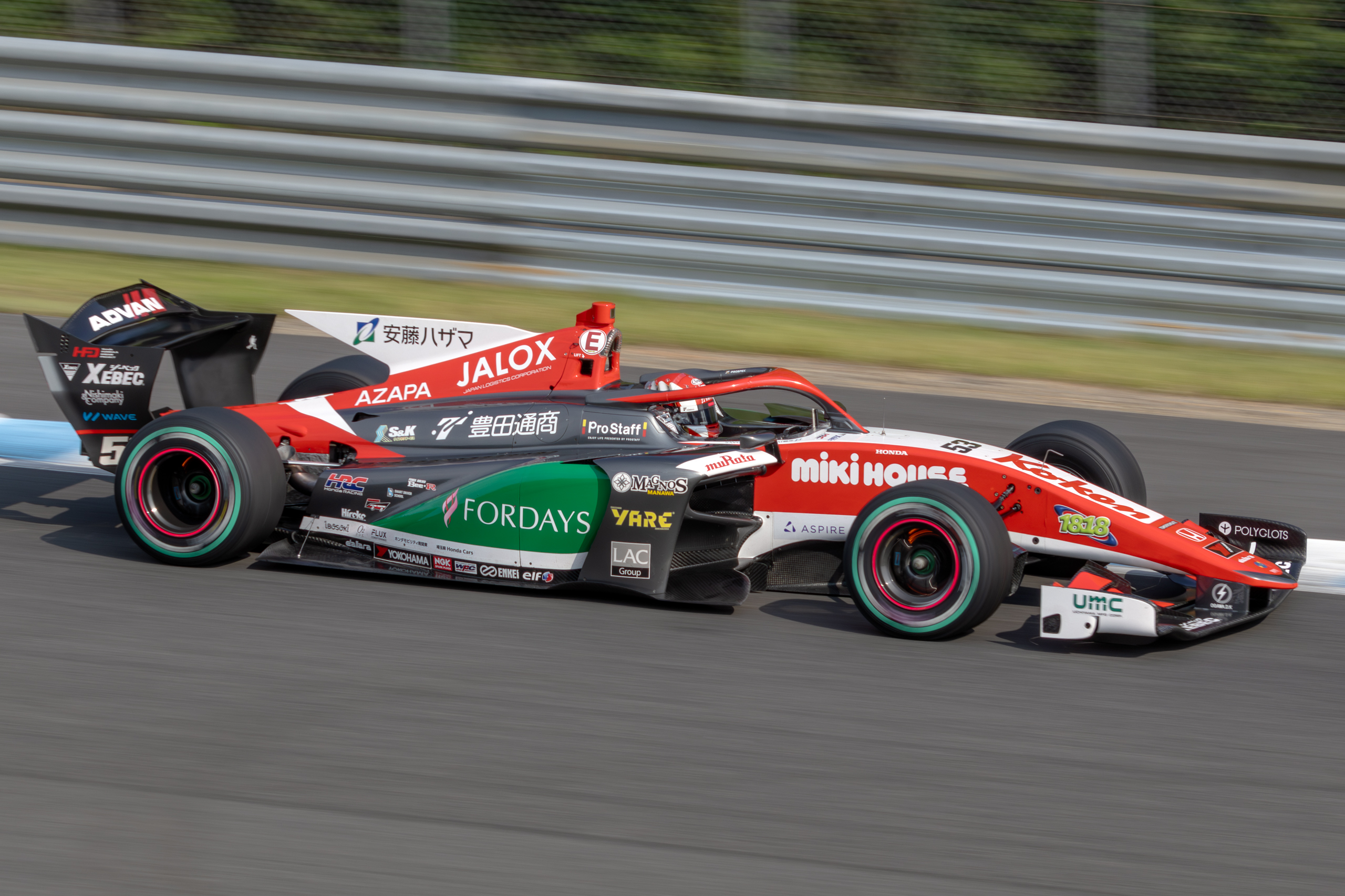
Juju Noda competing in the 2024 Super Formula Championship.

Historically, female participation at the top level of Japanese formula racing has been sparse and most of those who have competed have come from outside Japan. Divina Galica finished seventh in the third round of the 1980 All-Japan Formula 2 Championship, and Sarah Kavanagh competed in the first two rounds of the 1997 Formula Nippon Championship but was criticised by fellow competitors and local media for being dangerously slow. Tatiana Calderón contested most of the races across the 2020 and 2021 seasons, but did not complete the full season in either due to coronavirus-related travel restrictions. In 2024, Juju Noda became the first Japanese woman to compete in the category; after a season with TGM Grand Prix, she then moved to a new team founded by her father Hideki, however has remained a backmarker with no points finishes in three full seasons of competition.

=== Other professional series ===
Three women have competed in Formula E; Katherine Legge and Michela Cerruti competed in the first few races of the inaugural championship, whilst Simona de Silvestro drove for Andretti Autosport in the second season. Formula E have also hosted three female-exclusive test days; the first in December 2018 in Diriyah, the second at Jarama in November 2024 and the third in Valencia in October 2025.

María de Villota competed in thirteen events for Atlético Madrid in Superleague Formula, claiming a best finish of fourth in a race at the Nürburgring; she did not qualify for a Super Final.

=== Junior formulae ===
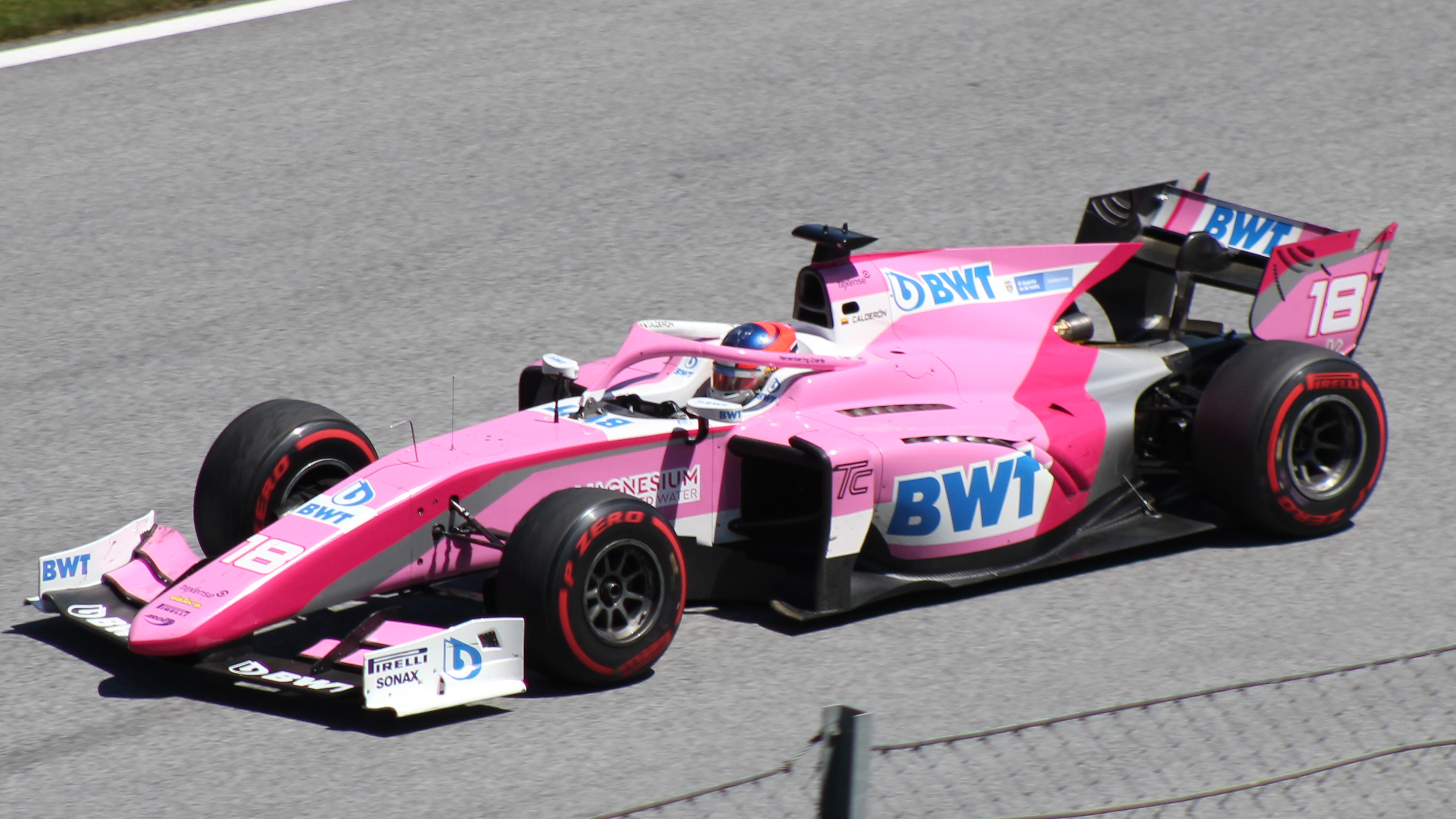
Tatiana Calderón racing in Formula 2 at the Red Bull Ring in 2019.

Divina Galica was also the only woman to compete in the original European Formula Two Championship; she made sporadic appearances between 1977 and 1980, with two eleventh-place finishes at Silverstone and Donington Park in 1979 being her best results. Upon becoming F3000, there was an uptick in female participation – Cathy Muller entered most of the 1986 season and finished seventeenth three times, whilst Giovanna Amati finished in the top-ten four times in fourteen starts between 1987 and 1991 (albeit failing to qualify for a further seventeen events). Ellen Lohr then failed to qualify for the Le Mans round in 1990 before Mercedes Stermitz did not start the non-championship 1992 World Cup in Buenos Aires; after this, no female drivers participated in International F3000 or the subsequent GP2 Series. In 2019, after the series had been rebranded back to Formula 2, Tatiana Calderón broke the drought with a full-season campaign for Arden – the Colombian also made a handful of starts for Charouz at the back end of the 2022 season, with a best finish of eleventh across both stints.

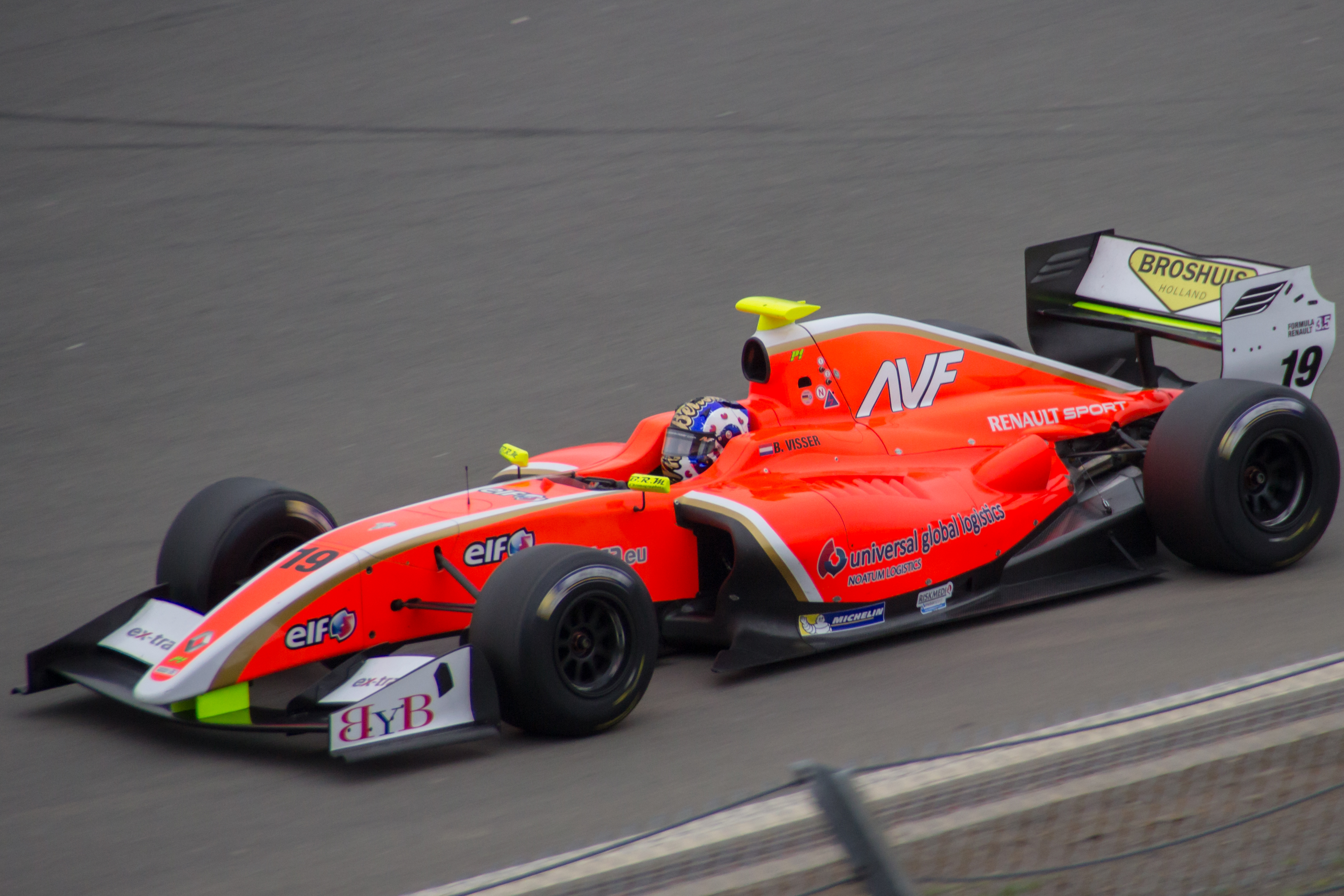
Beitske Visser competed in the Formula Renault 3.5 series in the mid-2010s.

Four women raced in Formula Renault 3.5 and its predecessors. Milka Duno scored just one points finish in 19 starts across 2001 and 2002, followed by Pippa Mann who completed the 2008 season. After winning a race in the 2013 ADAC Formel Masters, Beitske Visser spent the next three full seasons in Formula Renault 3.5; the Dutchwoman finished inside the top-five twice, both of which came at Jerez. Tatiana Calderón competed in the series' final ever event in Bahrain in 2017, finishing on the podium as part of a heavily-reduced field.

Two women participated in the MotorSport Vision-run Formula 2 series held between 2009 and 2012 – Natacha Gachnang and Natalia Kowalska.

As of 2026, seven women have competed in the GP3 Series and FIA Formula 3 Championship. Carmen Jordá, Vicky Piria and Alice Powell all made their debuts in the 2012 season; Jordá was the only driver of the three to contest multiple seasons, however Powell was the only one to score a championship point. Venezuelan Samin Gómez completed the 2013 season for Jenzer along with a handful of races in 2015, whilst Beitske Visser competed in a single event in both 2014 and 2015. Tatiana Calderón competed in the final three seasons under the GP3 moniker, becoming a regular point-scorer towards the end of the 2018 season. Sophia Flörsch is currently the only female driver to have competed in the FIA Formula 3 era, initially for Campos Racing in 2020 before returning with financial support from the series' parent company across 2023 and 2024 – the German scored her only points in a wet-dry race at Spa-Francorchamps.

Female participation in Formula Three varied by region and time period. Three women have raced in the Macau Grand Prix whilst under Formula 3 regulations, with best showings of eleventh place for both Cathy Muller in the first edition and Sophia Flörsch in the last iteration; Flörsch also infamously suffered a high-speed crash in the 2018 race, fracturing two vertebrae and injuring three photographers when her out-of-control car launched off a kerb and flew through a catch-fence. Muller also won a French F3 race at Circuit d'Albi in 1984, as did Rahel Frey in a German F3 race at the Nürburgring in 2009 and Jamie Chadwick in a BRDC F3 race at Brands Hatch in 2018.

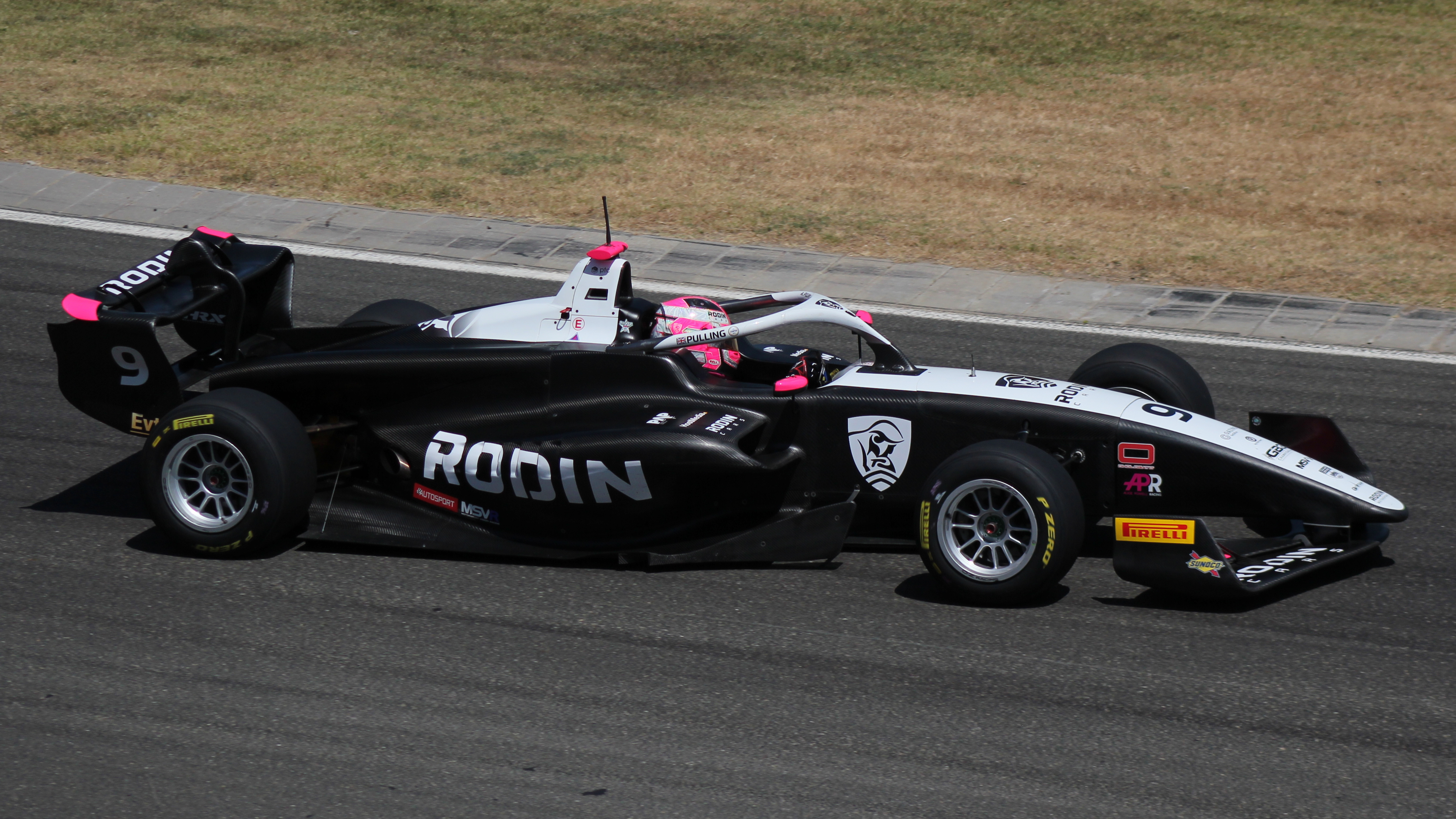
Abbi Pulling (pictured in 2025) was the first woman to win a race in the GB3 Championship in 2026.

Miki Koyama won the Formula Regional Japanese Championship in 2022, becoming the only woman to win a mixed-gender single-seater championship sanctioned by the FIA. Two other women have won mixed-gender Formula Regional or FR-adjacent races; Chloe Chambers won a reverse-grid race at Taupō in New Zealand in 2023, whilst Abbi Pulling took victory in a GB3 Championship race at Spa-Francorchamps in 2026. In 2021 and 2022, the Formula Regional European Championship restricted teams to only running three cars but granted exceptions for fourth entries if they were piloted by female drivers.

Alexandra Mohnhaupt, Belén García, Doriane Pin, Rafaela Ferreira, Abbi Pulling, Nerea Martí and Jade Jacquet have all won FIA-recognised mixed-gender races at the Formula 4 level as of 2026; Mohnhaupt was the first, doing so twice in one weekend during the 2017–18 NACAM series, whilst Martí also won a NACAM race in 2024. García was victorious in the first round of the 2019 Spanish series, Pin won the final race of the 2023 Formula 4 South East Asia Championship, Ferreira won multiple races in the 2024 F4 Brazilian Championship, Pulling won a heat of the 2024 British championship at Brands Hatch and Jacquet claimed victory in a race of the 2026 French F4 Championship. Additionally, Amna Al Qubaisi won a non-championship F4 UAE race in 2019 and Juju Noda has won races in the non-FIA-sanctioned F4 Danish Championship.

Jamie Chadwick also won the Indian-based MRF Challenge championship in 2018–19, whilst Ellen Lohr won the German Formula Ford championship in 1987.

==== Segregated series ====
In 2015, Formula One CEO Bernie Ecclestone first floated the idea of a separate World Championship for female drivers, citing commercial interest and later claiming that female drivers "wouldn't be taken seriously." The proposal sparked backlash from male and female drivers, with 2009 champion Jenson Button stating there was "no reason a woman can't race against guys," whilst Williams test driver Susie Wolff declared it was "most definitely not the right way forward."

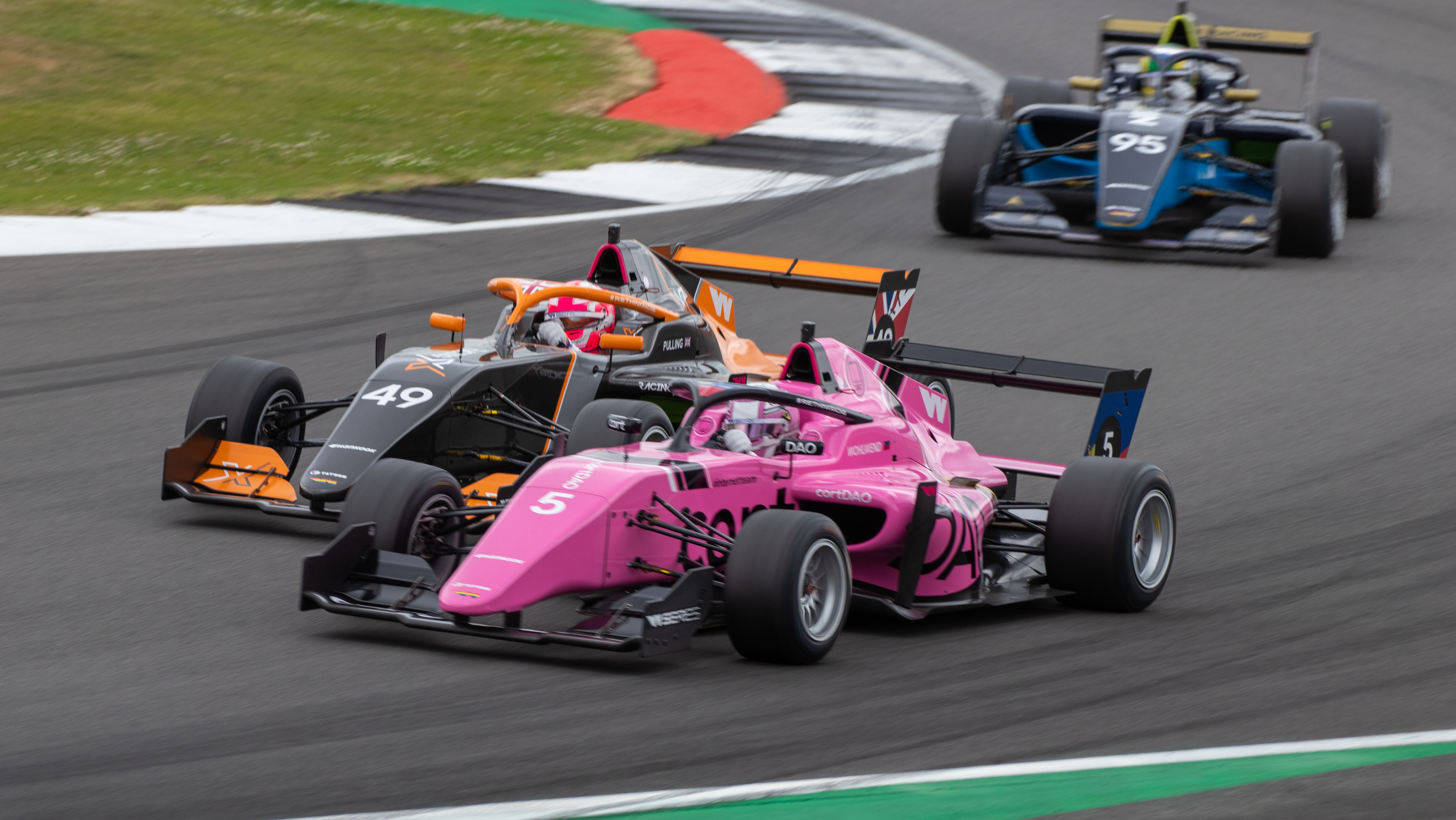
The W Series was the first attempt at a professional-level segregated single-seater championship, running between 2019 and 2022. Pictured: 2022 W Series Silverstone round.

In 2018, the W Series was launched as a Formula Regional-level feeder series with involvement from various ex-F1 personnel, including David Coulthard, Dave Ryan and Matt Bishop. The championship was presented as a merit-based series, with evaluations for potential drivers, all cars run by a single operator and a prize pool connected to the championship standings, however some applicants disputed the transparency of the driver selection. W Series ran in support of the DTM in 2019 before the 2020 season was cancelled due to the COVID-19 pandemic; it returned in 2021 on the Formula One support bill. Partway through the 2022 season, the championship cancelled its closing rounds due to financial problems and later fell into administration. Jamie Chadwick was the champion of all three seasons.

Formula One announced the creation of F1 Academy, a Formula 4-level championship designed to provide a smoother transition for female karters into car racing, at the end of 2022. Unrelated to W Series, the Susie Wolff-led project brought in established teams from Formula 2 and FIA Formula 3 to run three cars each whilst an age and season limit were placed on drivers. From the 2024 season onwards, all active Formula One constructors have been required to support at least one driver per season.

The Fuji Speedway-based Kyojo Cup was first held in 2017, utilising a spec open-cockpit prototype built from a Toyota Vitz. From 2025, the series switched to KCMG-built Formula 4 cars.

== Endurance and sportscar racing ==
=== 24 Hours of Le Mans ===
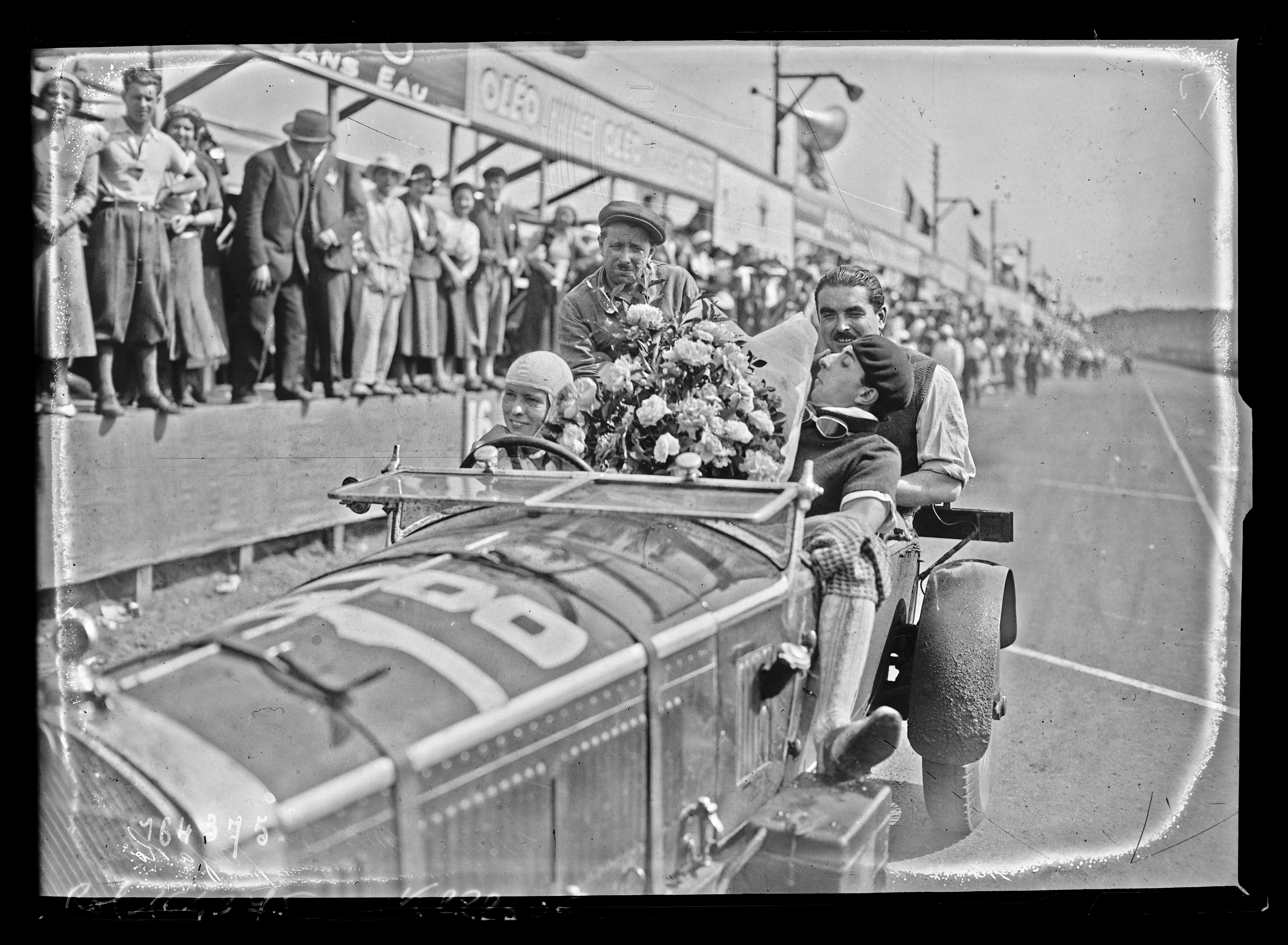
Odette Siko finished fourth outright in the 1932 24 Hours of Le Mans.

First held in 1923, Marguerite Mareuse and Odette Siko became the first women to compete in the 24 Hours of Le Mans in 1930, sharing a Bugatti Type 40 to seventh place overall. Two years later, Siko finished fourth outright alongside Louis Charavel, which remains the best outright result for a female driver as of 2026. Over the next two decades, punctuated by World War II, a further 25 female drivers participated in the race but none rivalled the early performances of Mareuse and Siko; Anne-Cécile Itier came closest with a 12th-place finish in 1938.

Following the Le Mans disaster in 1955, the Automobile Club de l'Ouest banned women from competing in the race indefinitely. The restriction was only lifted in 1971, possibly in response to the women's liberation movement, allowing Marie-Claude Beaumont to compete in a Chevrolet Corvette. Between 1973 and 1978, eight women claimed class honours – Beaumont in 1973 and 1974, Christine Beckers, Yvette Fontaine and Marie Laurent in a shared Chevron B23 in 1974, Michèle Mouton, Marianne Hoepfner and Christine Dacremont in a shared Moynet LM75 in 1975, and Anny-Charlotte Verney in 1978. As of 2026, Verney has the most starts for a female driver at Le Mans with 10, whilst a further 32 female drivers have participated in the race – three of whom, Desiré Wilson (1983), Lilian Bryner (1994) and Vanina Ickx (2011), are credited with outright top-ten finishes. Doriane Pin's crew led the majority of the 2026 race in the LMP2 class before suffering a brake failure with three hours remaining.

Leena Gade won the 2011 edition of the race as lead engineer on the No. 2 Audi R18 TDI, the only woman to have done so.

=== World championships ===
The first female drivers to compete in World Championship endurance racing did so at the 1953 1000 km of Nürburgring – "Madame Bizeray" drove a Renault 4CV alongside her husband Louis, whilst pre-war pioneer Simone des Forest shared a Porsche 356 with Elyane Imbert, however neither car was a classified finisher.

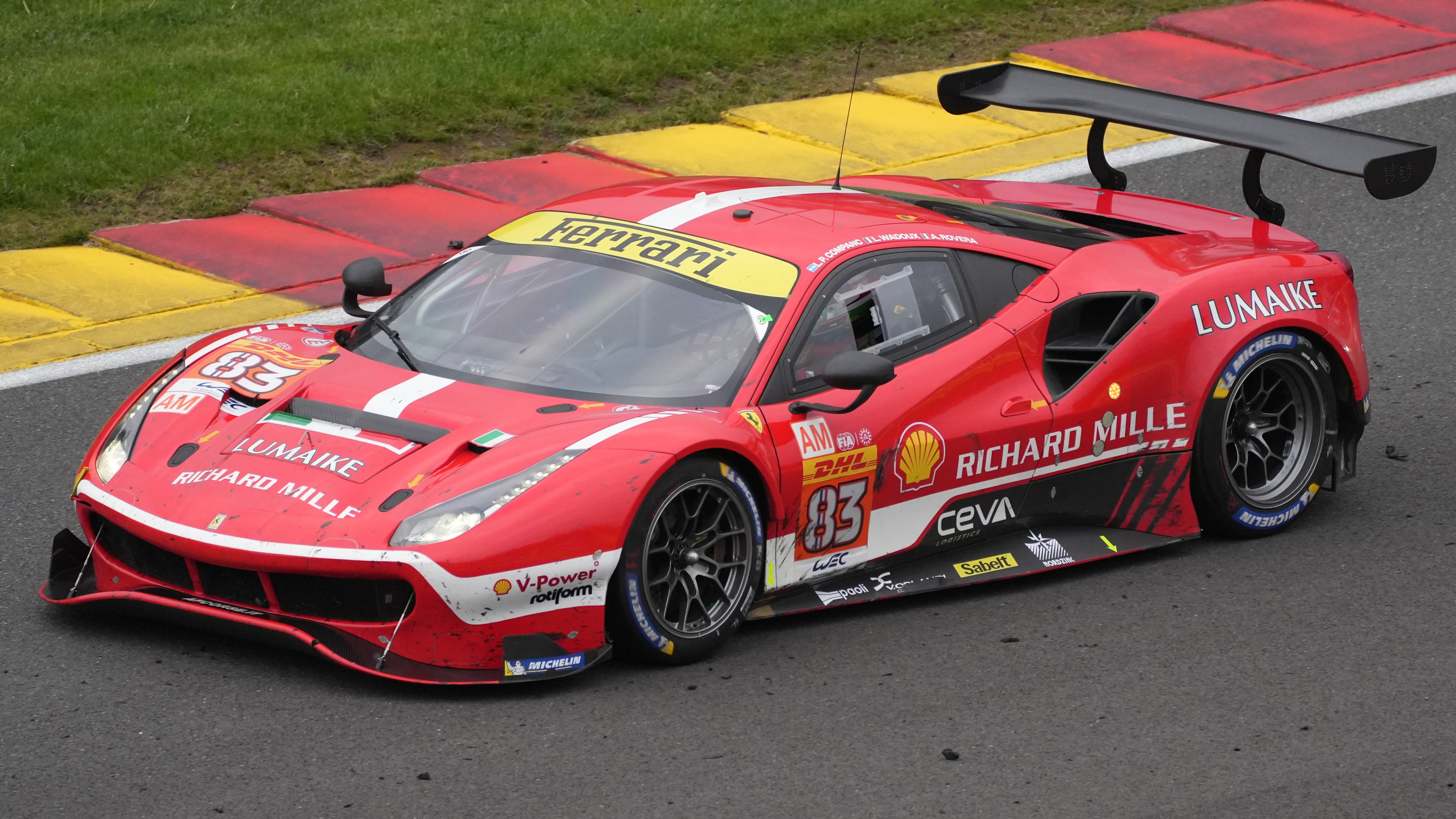
Lilou Wadoux is the first woman to win a World Endurance Championship race, doing so in the GTE class at the 2023 6 Hours of Spa-Francorchamps.

Keiko Ihara was the first woman to compete in the rebranded FIA World Endurance Championship from 2012, scoring two podiums in the LMP2 class in 2014. Doriane Pin also finished on the podium in the same class at the 2023 1000 Miles of Sebring, whilst an all-female driving crew consisting of Tatiana Calderón, Sophia Flörsch and Beitske Visser contested the 2021 season. In 2023 FIA World Endurance Championship, Lilou Wadoux became Ferrari's first female factory driver and went on to win the 2023 6 Hours of Spa-Francorchamps in the GTE class with Luís Pérez Companc and Alessio Rovera, the first race win for a female driver in WEC.

In 2018, French businesswoman and amateur racing driver Deborah Mayer founded the Iron Dames project. Mayer shopped the Dames entry to teams in various categories and provided them with female drivers, most notably in WEC with Kessel Racing, Iron Lynx Motorsport Lab and Manthey Racing. One of the most recognisable motorsport brands of the early-2020s, the Dames became the first all-female crew to win a WEC race – Sarah Bovy, Rahel Frey and Michelle Gatting taking GTE-class honours in the 2023 8 Hours of Bahrain en route to second in the championship. Following financial problems for parent company DC Racing Solutions in 2025, Iron Dames' entries were withdrawn from all categories at the end of the year however Mayer continued to provide support for select drivers.

=== North America ===
The North American IMSA series saw an influx of female drivers in the late-1970s and early-1980. Notably, Kathy Rude won the 1982 24 Hours of Daytona in class alongside Lee Mueller and Allan Moffat, and Bonnie Henn finished fourth outright in the 1982 Daytona 250 Miles.

Christina Nielsen won the GTD class championship in 2016 and 2017. Nielsen also won the 2016 12 Hours of Sebring in class, preceded only by Liz Halliday's LMP2-class win and second-place overall a decade earlier.

=== Japan ===
Seven women have competed in Super GT and its predecessor, the All Japan Grand Touring Car Championship. Jun Okanoya held multiple roles in Japanese motorsport before becoming the first female driver in the JGTC's history in 1995, and claimed a podium in the GT2 class on debut. Actress and idol Junko Mihara and motoring journalist Kumi Sato were regular participants in the late-1990s, whilst Keiko Ihara entered two races in 2003. Swiss driver Cyndie Allemann contested most of the 2012 season, and Lilou Wadoux scored a class podium in her sole GT300 season in 2024. Toyota junior driver Miki Koyama has been a regular competitor in the GT300 class since 2023, taking back-to-back podiums in the opening rounds of the 2026 season.

=== Other series ===
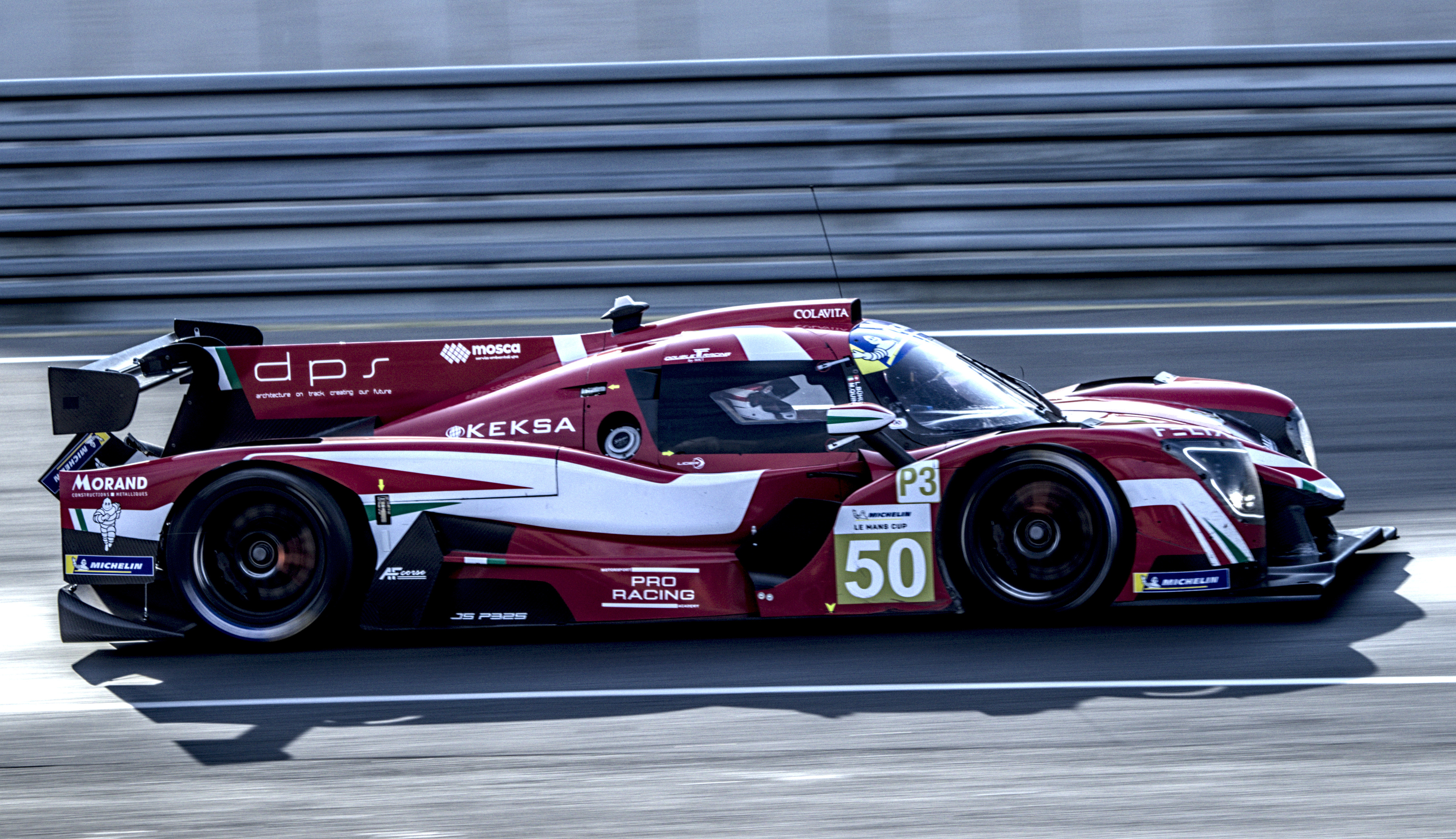
Léna Bühler won a race of the 2025 Le Mans Cup outright, the first woman to do so.

The Iron Dames were the first women to win a European Le Mans Series race in class, doing so at the 2022 4 Hours of Portimão with Sarah Bovy, Michelle Gatting and Doriane Pin. Two milestones were achieved at the 2025 4 Hours of Le Castellet; Jamie Chadwick became the first woman to win an ELMS race outright, and it was also the first ELMS race to feature female winners in multiple classes after Lilou Wadoux triumphed in the GTE division. In 2025, Léna Bühler became the first woman to win a Le Mans Cup race outright at the Circuit de la Sarthe, whilst the Iron Dames duo of Marta García and Vanina Ickx were the first all-female driving crew to win a Le Mans Cup race in class at Silverstone later in the year.

Sarah Moore won the Britcar Endurance Series in 2018 with a Ginetta G50, whilst Jamie Chadwick became the youngest winner of the Silverstone 24 Hours after winning the 2015 edition at 16 years of age.

Austrian driver Annie Bousquet set a womens' world record for speed at Montlhéry in 1955, lapping the course at an average of 230.5kph, before she was killed in a crash at the 12 Hours of Reims a year later.

=== Grand touring ===
Two women have won races in the ADAC GT Masters; Claudia Hürtgen won seven races between 2012 and 2014, finishing in the top five of the championship in all three of those seasons, whilst Rahel Frey also won a race in both the 2015 and 2016 seasons. Hürtgen also won the Dubai 24 Hour in 2011, and Frey also holds the best finish for a female driver at the Bathurst 12 Hour with fifth place in the 2014 edition.

The Iron Dames were the first all-female driving crew to win a major GT3 endurance race when they took Gold class honours in the 2022 24 Hours of Spa with Sarah Bovy, Rahel Frey, Michelle Gatting and Doriane Pin.

=== Nürburgring ===
Sabine Schmitz was widely considered to be one of if not the most experienced driver at the Nürburgring, having completed an estimated 20,000 laps of the 20-kilometre-long Nordschleife. Having grown up within the confines of the circuit, Schmitz won the 1996 and 1997 editions of the 24 Hours of Nürburgring outright in a BMW M3. After she passed away in 2021 following a long battle with cancer, the Nürburgring named one of its corners in her honour.

In 2019, WS Racing launched the "Girls Only" program; an entry made up entirely of female drivers and mechanics. Initially competing with a TCR-spec Mk.7 Golf, as of 2026 the team compete with a Porsche Cup car in the alternative fuels class; Pippa Mann, Célia Martin, Carrie Schreiner and Fabienne Wohlwend finished third in class at the 2022 24 Hours of Nürburgring in a BMW M4 GT4.

== Rally and off-road racing ==
=== World Rally Championship ===
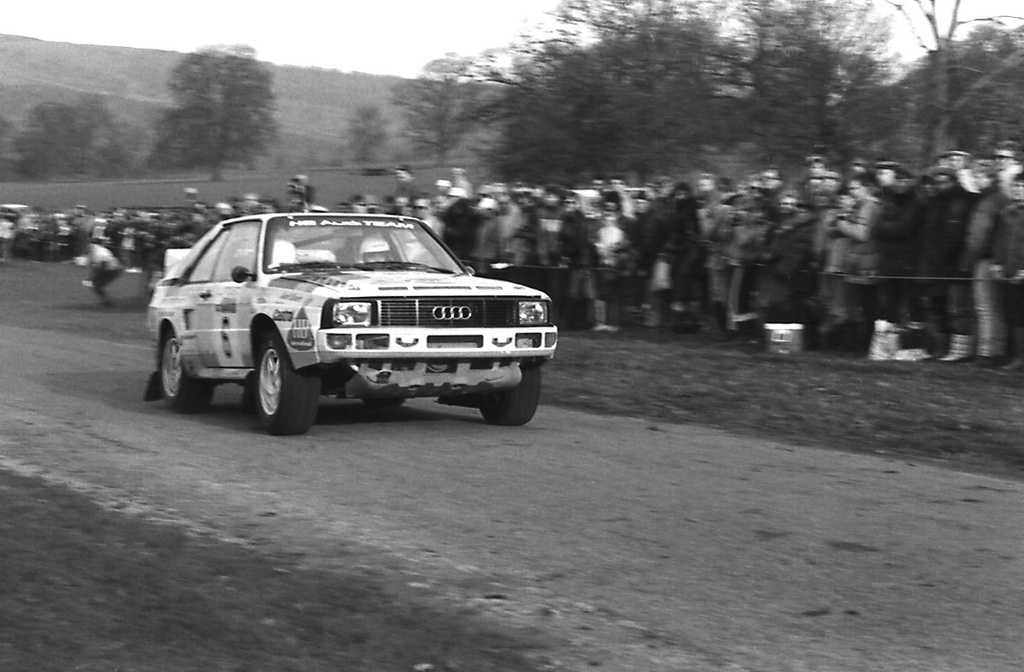
Michèle Mouton competing in the 1984 RAC Rally.

Michèle Mouton is considered by many media and fans to be the greatest female driver in motorsport history for her achievements in the World Rally Championship. After finishing runner-up in the 1977 European Rally Championship, she was signed by Audi to contest the 1981 World Rally Championship and won the Rallye Sanremo with Fabrizia Pons, becoming the first women to win a World Championship rally. Mouton finished runner-up in the 1982 season with three victories in Portugal, Brazil and Greece; she remained in contention for the title at the penultimate event of the season in Côte d'Ivoire, participating despite the death of her father and led by more than an hour before being struck down by mechanical problems. Mouton retired in 1986 after the demise of the Group B regulation set, but not before winning the Pikes Peak International Hill Climb in 1985. Mouton faced sexism in her career, with Ari Vatanen claiming before her win in San Remo, "never can nor will I lose to a woman", whilst her 1982 title rival and team-mate Walter Röhrl stated that he would not have accepted losing to Mouton "not because I doubt her capabilities as a driver, but because she is a woman." In 2024, she received the FIA's Lifetime Achievement Award.

Isabelle Galmiche is the only other female co-driver to win a WRC event outright, navigating Sébastien Loeb to victory in the 2022 Monte Carlo Rally.

Between 1990 and 1995, the WRC ran a Ladies Cup that was contested across the classes. Louise Aitken-Walker beat Paola de Martini to the inaugural title despite crashing into a lake at Rally de Portugal. Isolde Holderied won the last two iterations of the Cup and is also the most recent female driver to score outright points, doing so at the 1995 Rallye Monte Carlo.

In the modern smaller-capacity classes, Maxine Wahome won the 2022 Safari Rally in the WRC-3 class.

=== Other rally championships ===
Ewy Rosqvist and Pat Moss were the main protagonists for the European Ladies' Rally Championship in the 1950s and 1960s, winning all but one of the titles between 1958 and 1965.

Molly Taylor is the only female driver to have won the Australian Rally Championship, doing so in 2016. Her mother Coral has won the ARC six times as a co-driver.

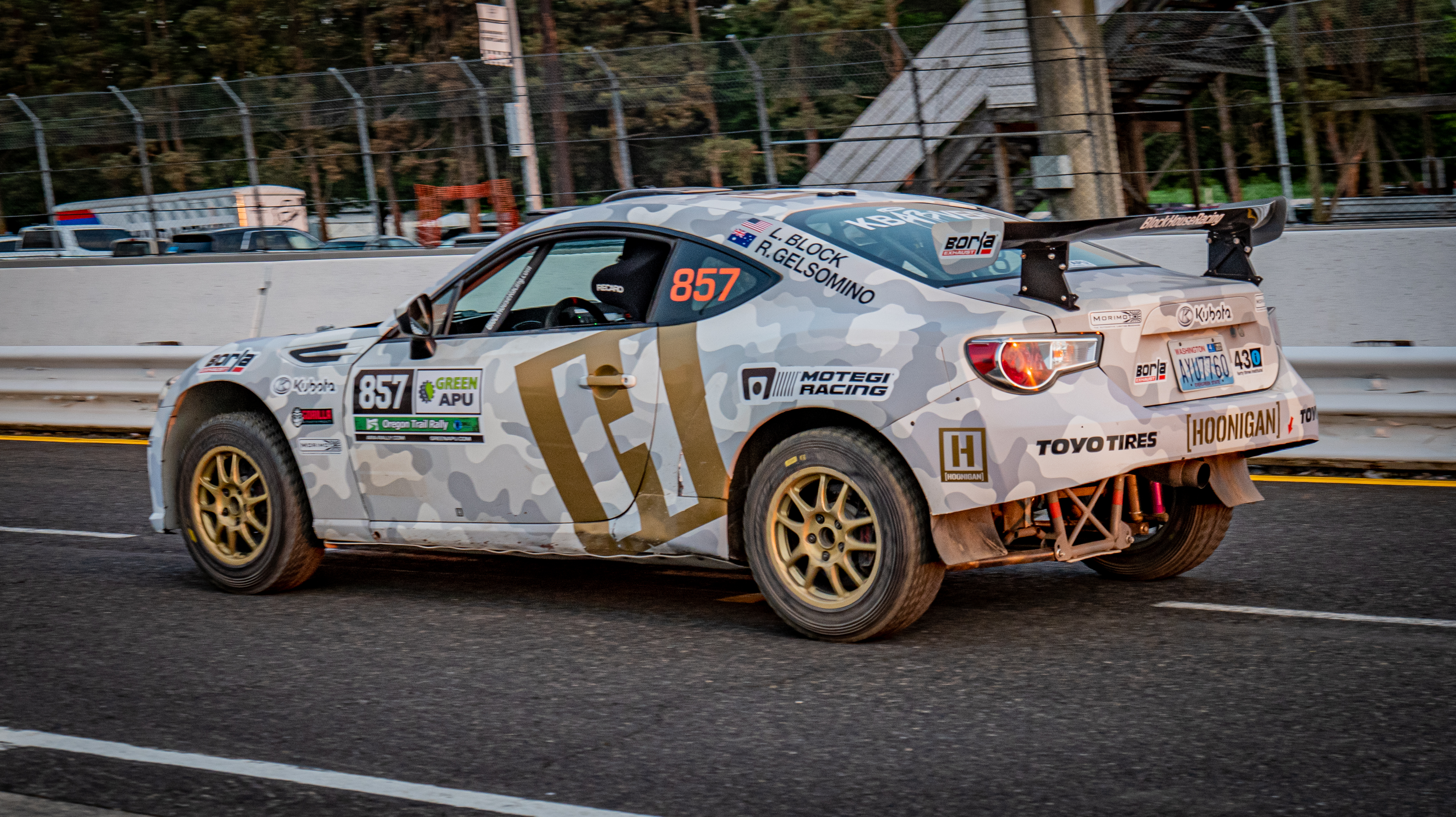
Lia Block won the Open 2WD class championship of the 2023 American Rally Association.

Lia Block is the only woman to win an American Rally Association event outright at the 2026 Ojibwe Forest Rally, and is the youngest ARA champion after winning the Open 2WD class at 16 years of age.

=== Off-road ===
Two women have won the Dakar Rally in their class; Jutta Kleinschmidt won the Cars category in 2001 after Jean-Louis Schlesser received a penalty for "unsportsmanlike conduct", and Cristina Gutiérrez won the 2024 edition in Saudi Arabia in the T3 Prototype buggy class.

The Extreme E championship required that each car featured a male and female driver. Molly Taylor, Cristina Gutiérrez and Mikaela Åhlin-Kottulinsky were the female half of the championship-winning crews in the three seasons held before the 2024 season was cancelled and it transitioned to a hydrogen formula in 2025.

=== Rallycross ===
Ramona Karlsson and Klara Andersson participated in the FIA World Rallycross Championship at opposite ends of its twelve-season tenure. Andersson finished on the podium three times in the RX1e category.

Anderssons' older sister Magda is the only female driver to win a FIA European Rallycross Championship final, doing so in the TouringCar class of the 2016 Euro RX of Belgium.

At the 2016 World RX of Norway, an all female panel of stewards officiated for the first time at an FIA World Championship event.

== Touring car racing ==
=== International ===
Apart from a few guest starts for Annette Meeuvissen and Mercedes Stermitz in the standalone 1987 season, two women made a pair of wildcard starts at their home World Touring Car Championship races – María de Villota at Valencia in 2006 and 2007, and Nürburgring specialist Sabine Schmitz at the Nordschleife in 2015 and 2016. At the 2016 Nürburgring round, Ukrainian Super1600 driver Kseniya Niks was one of a select number of European Touring Car Cup entries to fill the field.

Jessica Bäckman was the only woman to race in the World Touring Car Cup era, doing so in the first half of 2021.

=== Australia ===
The zenith of female involvement in Australian touring car racing came in the 1960s and 1970s; however, most of these appearances came at the Bathurst enduro which (prior to 1973) was a production car race and unrelated to the Australian Touring Car Championship. In 1975, Christine Gibson (née Cole) became the first to contest the touring car championship proper and claimed class honours in four of the five races she competed in, finishing fifth in the outright championship thanks to points weighting. Later that same year, French rally driver Marie-Claude Beaumont earned the best outright finish for a female driver at the Bathurst 1000 with sixth place, a result equalled by Gibson in 1981. Sue Ransom competed in just one ATCC season in a lower-class Ford Capri, but matched Gibson's outright achievements with fifth in the 1978 standings.

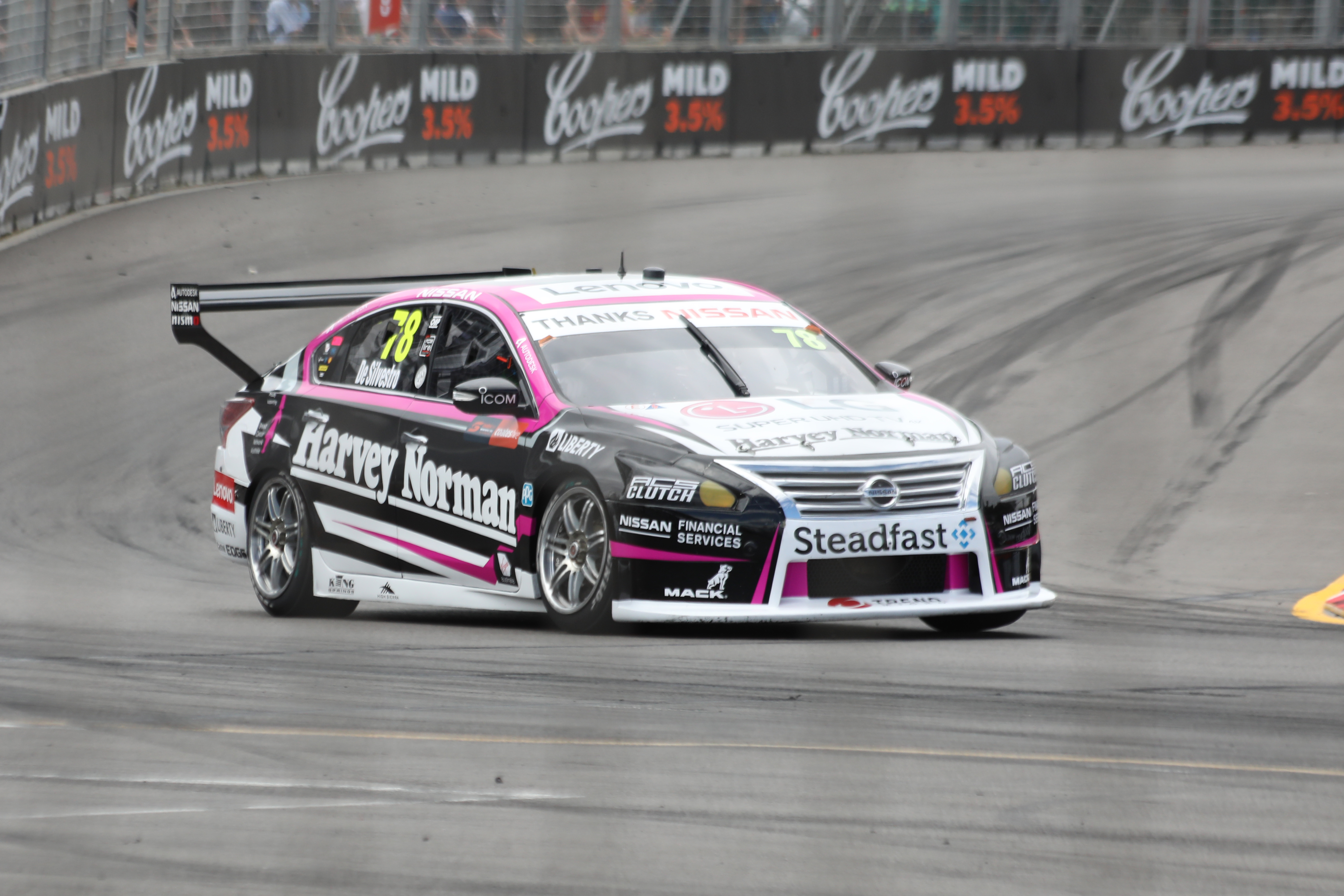
Simona de Silvestro competing in the 2018 Newcastle 500.

Outside of a few high-profile international entries at the Bathurst 1000 – Janet Guthrie with Indianapolis 500 winner Johnny Rutherford in 1977, Annette Meeuvissen and Mercedes Stermitz sharing a factory BMW in 1987 – womens' participation at the top level was largely limited to lower-profile private entries until the formation of the Castrol Cougars project in 1997. At the behest of team sponsor Castrol, Larry Perkins ran a third car for female drivers across the 1997 and 1998 seasons with driving shared by Melinda Price and Kerryn Brewer; the pairing claimed a best finish of eleventh at the 1998 Australia 1000. Leanne Ferrier took part in the series' endurance races in 2001 and 2009 before another all-female project, the Harvey Norman Supergirls, was created for lower-division driver Renee Gracie and IndyCar Series regular Simona de Silvestro to compete at Bathurst in 2015 and 2016. De Silvestro then spent the next three seasons as a full-time competitor before returning to her native Europe at the end of 2019.

Billionaire businesswoman Betty Klimenko became the first female team owner in V8 Supercars when her team, Erebus Motorsport, bought out Stone Brothers Racing ahead of the 2013 season. Erebus went on to win the Bathurst 1000 in 2017 and 2024, as well as the overall championship with Brodie Kostecki in 2023.

Seven women have also raced in the second-tier Super2 Series – Ferrier (2001–2002, 2009), Amber Anderson (2010), Gracie (2015–2017), Chelsea Angelo (2015–2016), Abbie Eaton (2019), Elly Morrow (2022–2023) and Alice Buckley (2026). Ferrier scored five podiums in the 2001 season and finished fifth in the championship.

=== Brazil ===
Whilst Stock Car Brasil races have been held since 1979, only since 2014 have women competed at the top level of Brazilian domestic motorsport. Ana Beatriz de Figueiredo contested six consecutive seasons and scored two top-five finishes before a combination of pregnancy and a legal matter pushed her out of the category. Bruna Tomaselli raced in the lower division Stock Series for multiple seasons in the mid-2020s before being promoted as an injury replacement in the final round of the 2024 season. Antonella Bassani, daughter of former team owner Eduardo Bassani, has also made a handful of individual event starts as a replacement driver.

=== Germany ===
Susie Stoddart in the 2007 DTM Brands Hatch round.

Ellen Lohr is the only female driver to have won a DTM race, having done so during the Group A touring car era at the Hockenheimring in 1992. Following the collapse and rebuild of the series in the late-1990s and early-2000s, the DTM began a female driver push in 2006 with Vanina Ickx joining Audi and Susie Stoddart joining Mercedes-AMG; Stoddart became a series mainstay, with two seventh-place finishes in 2010 her best results, whilst Audi went through greater turnover by replacing Ickx with Katherine Legge before Legge was in-turn replaced with Rahel Frey. Both Stoddart and Frey were released at the end of 2012, and the next female representation did not come until the DTM switched to GT3 regulations in 2021 with Sophia Flörsch and Esmee Hawkey – Flörsch scored two ninth-place finishes en route to eighteenth in the standings, but only Hawkey continued into 2022 before the Englishwomans' team withdrew from the series mid-season.

=== Scandinavia ===
Two women raced in the formative years of the Swedish Touring Car Championship; Elisabeth Nilsson and Nettan Lindgren-Jansson. Nilsson finished second in the Karlskoga round of the inaugural season, and Lindgren-Jansson completed most of the 1998 and 1999 seasons. Fifteen years later, Emma Kimiläinen spent three seasons in the Scandinavian Touring Car Championship during its Solution F era, finishing on the podium three times in thirty-three starts, whilst Emelie Liljeström made select starts in the 2015 season. Mikaela Åhlin-Kottulinsky became the first female driver to win an STCC race, doing so at Karlskoga in 2018 following the series' switch to TCR machinery, and went on to finish runner-up in the 2021 championship.

=== United Kingdom ===
Scottish rally driver Geunda Eadie contested a single season of the British Touring Car Championship in 1980 after winning a Ladies' Ford Fiesta Challenge the year before. Nettan Lindgren-Jansson and Louise Aitken-Walker found class success in the early-1990s, as did Paula Cook in the Independent class during the highly-competitive Super Touring era. Following the demise of Super Touring, the likes of Annie Templeton and Joanna Clarke participated in the Production class in the early-2000s, whilst Fiona Leggate finished in the top-five in a race at Silverstone during her three-season tenure. In 2020, Jade Edwards became the first third-generation BTCC driver; over the course of four seasons she made 91 starts and scored points on two occasions.

== Stock car racing ==
=== NASCAR Cup ===
Sara Christian was the first female NASCAR driver, finishing in thirteenth place in the series' first ever race. All but one of her seven starts came driving her husbands' cars, and she remains the only female driver to finish a Cup Series race inside the top-five. In the series' second official race at Daytona Beach, Christian was joined by Ethel Mobley and Louise Smith – the three also shared the track later in the season at Langhorne Speedway, two of only three occasions on which three women have competed in a Cup Series race.

Multiple women made one-off entries in the 1950s and 1960s before Janet Guthrie began competing on a part-time basis between 1976 and 1980. At the 1977 Firecracker 400, NASCAR invited F1 driver Lella Lombardi and endurance racer Christine Beckers to join Guthrie in a 'showcase' of female talent – none of the three women finished the race due to mechanical or handling problems, however Guthrie did go on to post four top-ten finishes before the end of that season. Patty Moise started five races in the late-1980s, with a best finish of 26th at the 1988 Firecracker 400.

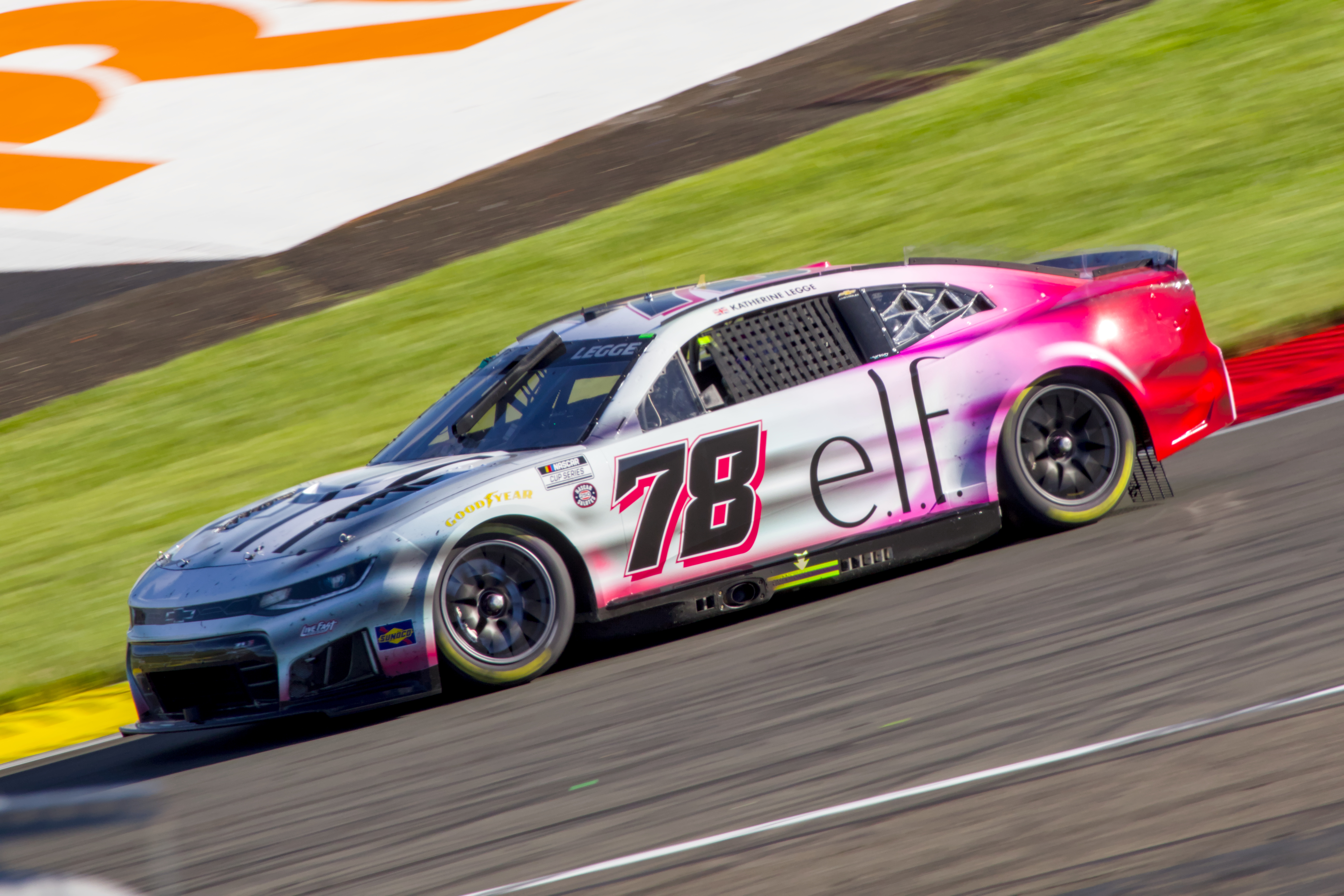
Katherine Legge is the first female driver to attempt the American motorsport "double" at Indianapolis and Charlotte.

In the 21st century, three women have competed in the top division of NASCAR. Danica Patrick is the most prolific of these, competing in 191 races between 2012 and 2018 and claiming pole position for the 2013 Daytona 500, the only pole position for a female driver in the Cup Series. Shawna Robinson started eight races in the early-2000s, with a best finish of 24th in the 2002 Daytona 500. Britain's Katherine Legge is the most recent woman to compete in the Cup Series, notably becoming the first female driver to attempt the Indianapolis 500–World 600 double in 2026.

=== NASCAR feeder series ===
Patrick and Robinson are the most successful female drivers in NASCAR's second division, each taking a single pole position whilst Patrick also finished fourth at the 2011 Las Vegas 300. Moise has the most starts in the second tier with 133.

In the Truck Series, Jennifer Jo Cobb has more than three times as many appearances as the next-most female driver, starting 234 races between 2008 and 2024. Natalie Decker holds the best finish for a female driver in the Truck Series, finishing fifth in the 2020 Daytona 250.

Two women have won races in ARCA competition, both in the Western division. Hailie Deegan was the first, doing so at the 2018 Idaho 208 before going on to win four more races – two in 2019 and two in 2026. Gracie Trotter is the other, winning a race of the 2020 season at The Bullring at Las Vegas Motor Speedway.

Robinson is credited as the first woman to win any form of NASCAR race, doing so in ISCARS-sanctioned competition at Asheville-Weaverville Speedway in 1988.

=== NASCAR international series ===
Beitske Visser competing in the 2026 NASCAR Euro Series.

Tatiana Calderón is the only woman to have won a race outright in one of NASCAR's non-American divisions, doing so in a Brazilian championship race at the Circuito dos Cristais in 2026.

Alexandra Mohnhaupt won Rookie of the Year honours in the 2025 NASCAR Mexico Truck Series after qualifying for the playoffs.

=== Trans-Am ===
Amy Ruman twice won the top-class championship of American Trans-Am racing in the mid-2010s, the only woman to have done so, having already taken the first outright race win for a female driver in the category in 2011. Deborah Gregg, widow of former driver Peter, also had success in Trans-Am in the 1980s, finishing on the podium twice for Jack Roush en route to fifth in the 1987 championship.

Outside of North America, Alice Buckley has won multiple races in the Australian TA2 Racing Muscle Car Series.

=== Turismo Carretera ===
One of the longest-running active championships having started in 1937, four women have competed in Turismo Carretera – Argentina's premier motor-racing championship – as drivers. Delia Borges competed in seven races between 1951 and 1953, including the 1951 Gran Premio Argentino de Carretera as part of the largest entry list in series' history. Dora Bavio also contested seven races, scoring the best finish to date for a female driver with 8th place in the 1970 Vuelta a Salto. Marisa Panagópulo raced three times in the 1996 season and Julia Ballario competed alongside Camilo Echevarría and Sebastián Abella in the 2018 1000km Buenos Aires, however Ballario was not eligible to score points as a designated co-driver. Mariana Vassalli also won the penultimate TC race that employed navigators as passenger to Patricio di Palma in 2007.

=== Other series ===
Two female drivers participated in the British ASCAR Racing Series in the early-2000s, Amanda Stretton and Paula Cook. Stretton claimed two seventh-place finishes in the inaugural season.

== One-make series ==
Since 2001, Ellen Lohr is the only driver to have contested a full season of the Porsche Supercup, finishing 11th overall in the 2003 season. Christina Nielsen and Abbie Eaton have taken class victories in the German (2012) and British (2024) Carrera Cup championships respectively, whilst Esmee Hawkey was Pro-Am champion of the 2020 Porsche Carrera Cup Great Britain.

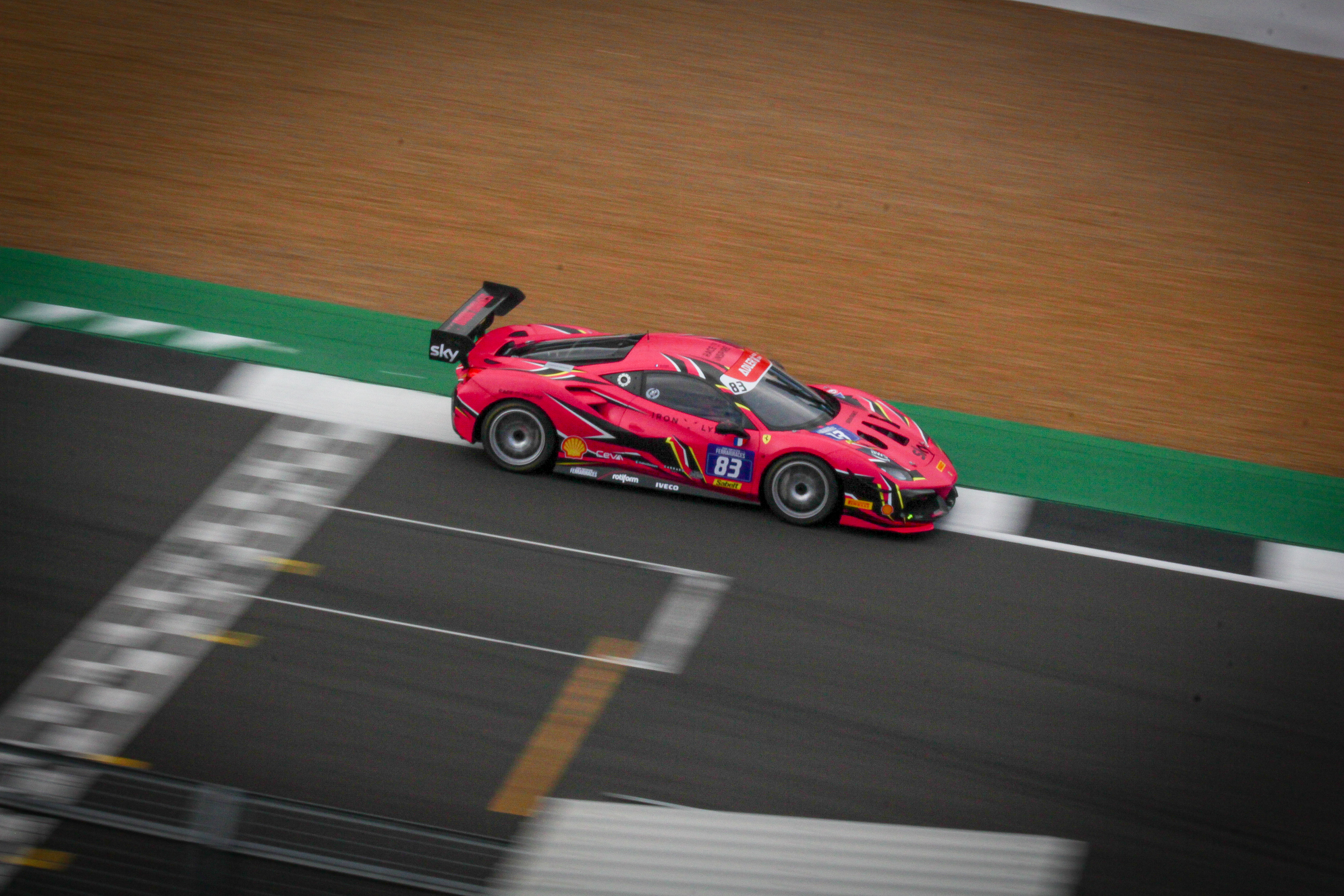
Doriane Pin won the Ferrari Challenge Europe championship in 2022.

Fabienne Wohlwend became the first woman to win a Ferrari Challenge race outright in 2017, doing so in a European championship race at Imola – the Liechtensteiner then went on to win the 2018 World Finals in her class. Michelle Gatting and Doriane Pin have since won the Ferrari Challenge Europe championship outright in 2021 and 2022 respectively.

Hailie Deegan was the only female driver to compete in the SRX Series during its three-year tenure, scoring a podium on debut at Knoxville in 2021 and another at Eldora in 2023, on both occasions finishing runner-up to Tony Stewart.

Ashley Gregory won a Mini Challenge UK race outright at Donington Park in 2025, whilst Erika Lavazza claimed a class victory in the Italian Mini Challenge at Mugello in 2022.

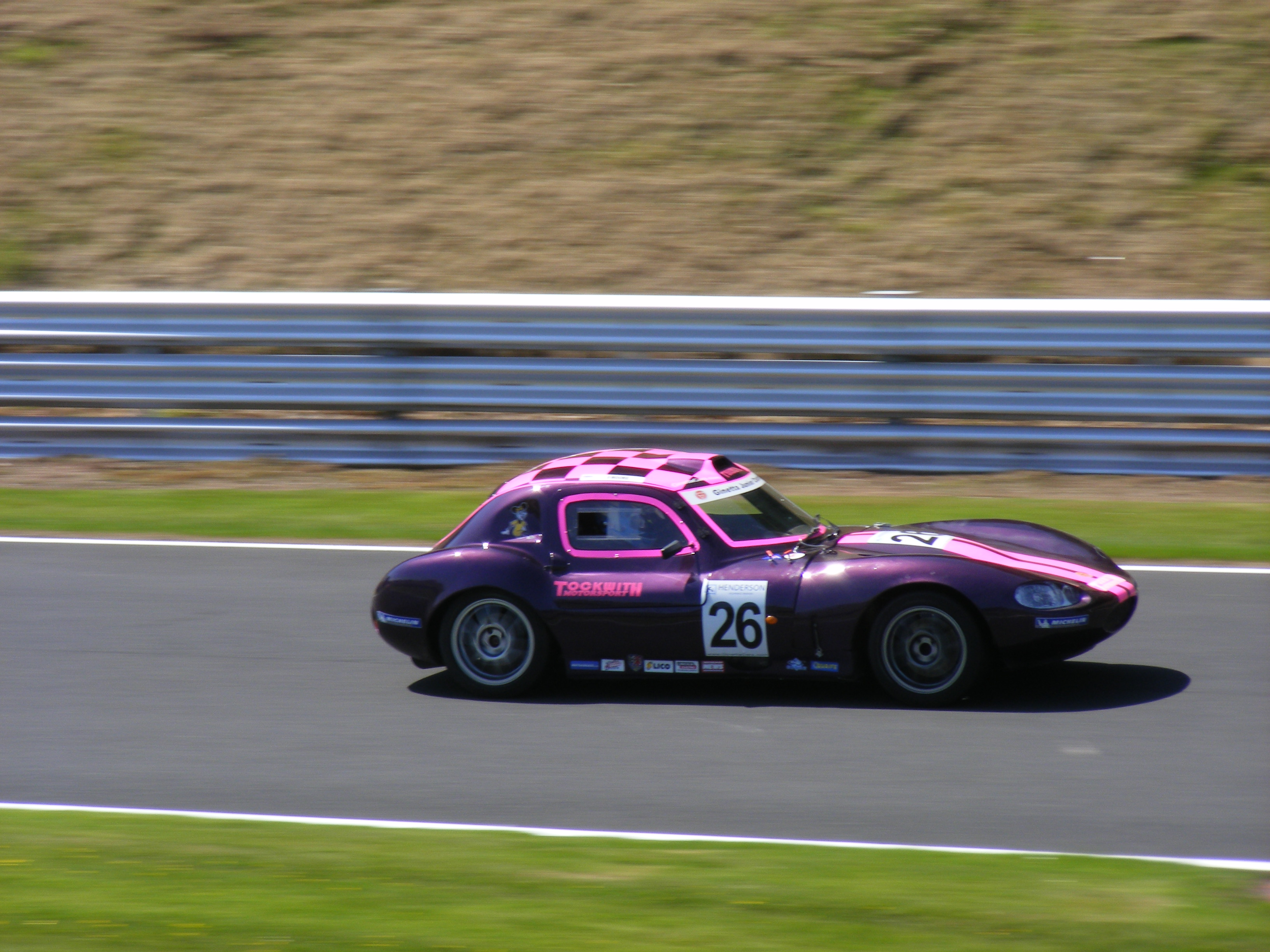
Sarah Moore en route to winning the 2009 Ginetta Junior Championship.

Sarah Moore is the first and only female champion of the British entry-level Ginetta Juniors category, winning the 2009 championship at 16 years of age. German driver Sophia Flörsch also won races in the 2015 season as a 14-year-old.

Latvia's Patricija Stalidzane and Sweden's Siri Hökfelt each won a race in the electric NXT Gen Cup, both doing so at the Sachsenring in 2025.

From its inception as the X1 Racing League in 2019, the Indian Racing League has required its franchises to enter one female driver as part of its four-person roster. Sarah Moore was the first female driver to win an IRL race in 2023, whilst Fabienne Wohlwend won the championship alongside Raoul Hyman in the 2025–26 season. Mira Erda is the only domestic female driver to have competed in the series as of 2026, doing so in 2024.

== Motorcycle racing ==
=== Road racing ===
Ana Carrasco became the first woman to win an individual motorcycle world championship race in 2017, doing so at Portimão in the Supersport 300 World Championship. A year later, Carrasco won the overall Supersport 300 title, becoming the first female rider to win a solo motorcycle road-racing world championship title.

=== Motocross ===
In 2005, the FIM created a separate World Cup for women in motocross, which was upgraded to World Championship status in 2007. Kiara Fontanesi is the series' most successful rider, winning six titles between 2012 and 2018.

== Drag racing ==
Women have long been prominent in Top Fuel, a leading class of drag racing. One of the first was Shirley Muldowney, who was the first driver to win three National Hot Rod Association championships in the United States, in 1977, 1980, and 1982. As of 2026, women have won seven out of the last nine European Top Fuel championships, and make up 20% of the drivers in the American and European championships. Participants have identified the sport's collaborative grassroots structure, family-oriented junior programmes, and lack of hostility towards female drivers, as leading reasons in the sport's comparative overrepresentation of women in motorsport. Female drag racers are also becoming more prominent outside the Western world, with leading examples in Brazil, South Africa, India, and the Middle East.

== Karting ==
"It is good to be awarded a trophy as the best female driver, but the real challenge for me remains to beat the boys on the track! When I compete, I feel myself as a racing driver, not as a girl."

— Beitske Visser at the 2010 CIK-FIA Karting Awards Ceremony.

Five women and girls have won major senior international karting titles:

- Susanna Raganelli, World Championship, 1966
- Cathy Muller, European Championship, 100cc, 1979
- Sophie Kumpen, Andrea Margutti Trophy, FA, 1995
- Beitske Visser, WSK Master Series, KZ2, 2010
- Luna Fluxá, Champions of the Future Academy Program, OK-N, 2024

Additionally, Cyndie Allemann won the CIK-FIA Green Helmet Trophy in 1999, and Marta García won the Academy Trophy and Trofeo delle Industrie in 2015, all in junior classes.

== Initiatives ==
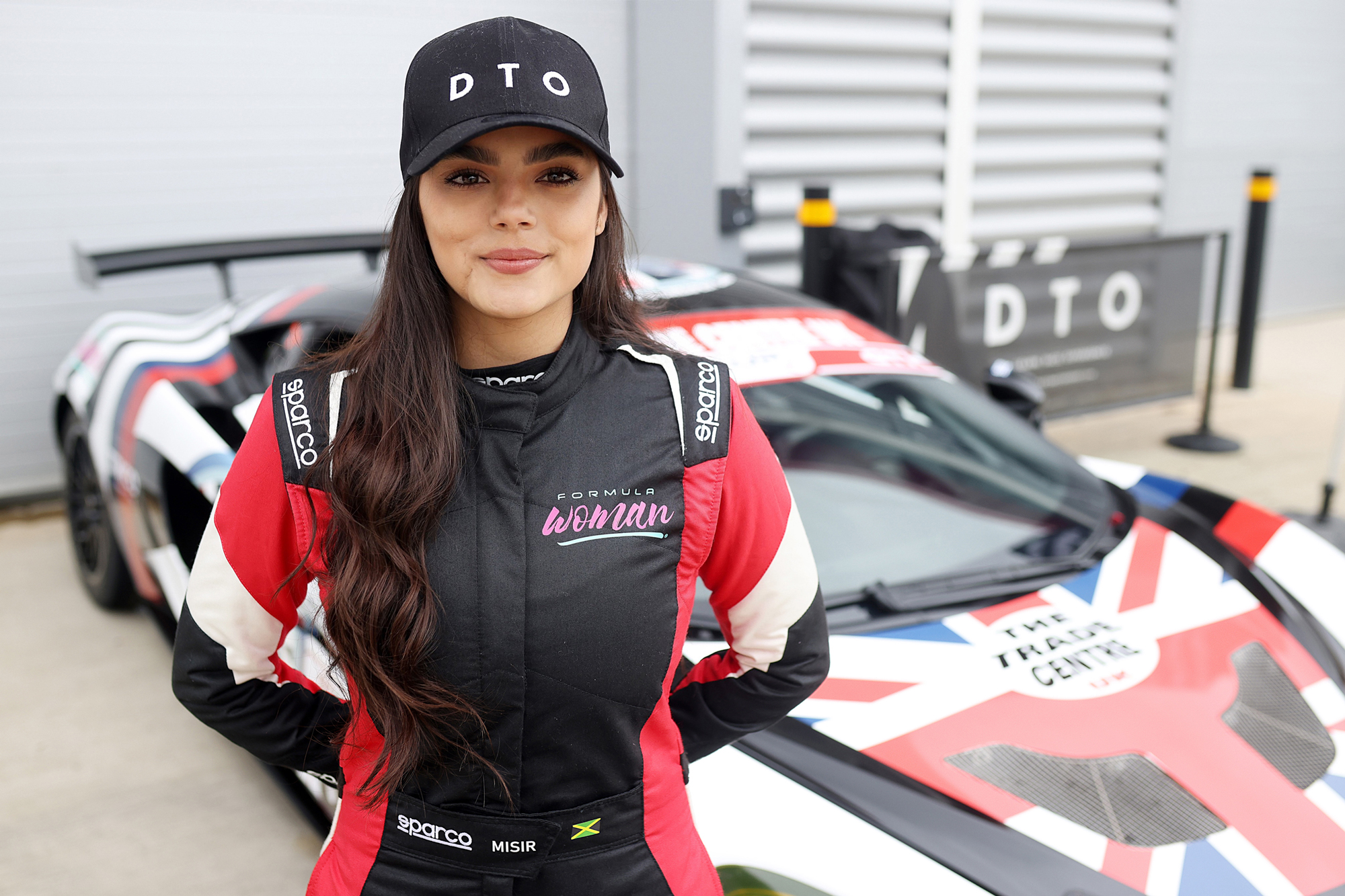
Jamaica's Sara Misir was a beneficiary of the re-launched Formula Woman program.

In 2009, the Fédération Internationale de l'Automobile launched the Women in Motorsport Commission to encourage and facilitate female participation.

Former DTM driver Susie Wolff launched the nonprofit foundation Dare to be Different in 2016 as a platform to workshop motorsport participation to school-age girls. In 2020, the organisation merged with the FIA Girls on Track initiative launched a year earlier.

Formula Woman was launched as a made-for-TV serial championship in 2004, hiring applicants based on presentation skills instead of driving ability. It ran for three seasons, initially using Mazda RX-8s before switching to Caterham 7s, before being quietly cancelled ahead of an advertised 2007 season. In 2021, it was re-launched as a knockout competition in a similar vein to the Shannons Supercar Showdown, with the winners receiving a funded drive in a GT4 car in the British GT Cup Championship.

== See also ==
- List of female racing drivers
