= Husk (disambiguation) =

A husk is the outer shell or coating of a seed.

Husk may also refer to:

== Fictional characters ==
=== Print, film, and television ===
- Husk (comics), a Marvel Comics mutant
- Husk, a character in adult-animated musical series Hazbin Hotel
- Husk, a character in children's novel series The Mistmantle Chronicles
- Danny Husk, recurring character in the TV series, The Kids in the Hall
- Geraldine Husk, villain in 2000s American animated series Totally Spies!
- Terry Husk, the protagonist in The Order (2024 film)

=== Video games ===
- Husks, a type of Reaper unit in the Mass Effect trilogy
- The Husks, a fictional race of creatures in the video game Fortnite: Save the World
- Husk, a zombie variant in the video game Minecraft

== Other uses ==
- Husk (film), a 2011 horror film
- Husk (animal disease), also known as parasitic bronchitis
- Husk (surname), list of people with the surname
