= Husk (surname) =

Husk is a surname. Notable people with the surname include:

- Cecil Husk (1847–1920), British professional singer and spiritualist medium
- William Henry Husk (1814–1887), English historian of music and critic
