= Dorothy Levitt =

British racing driver and journalist (1882–1922)

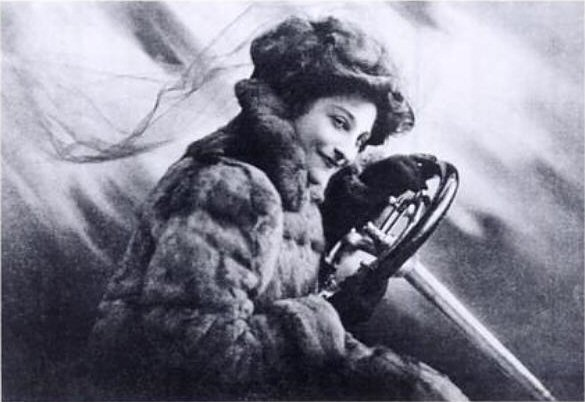
- Levitt on the frontispiece of The Woman and the Car
- Born: Elizabeth Levi; 5 January 1882; Hackney, Middlesex, UK
- Died: 17 May 1922 (aged 40); Marylebone, London, UK
- Occupations: racing driver; journalist

Dorothy Elizabeth Levitt (born Elizabeth Levi; 5 January 1882 – 17 May 1922) was a Jewish British racing driver and journalist. She was the first British woman racing driver, holder of the world's first water speed record, the women's world land speed record holder, and an author. She was a pioneer of female independence and female motoring and taught Queen Alexandra and the British royal princesses how to drive. In 1905, she established the record for the longest drive achieved by a lady driver by driving a De Dion-Bouton from London to Liverpool and back over two days, receiving the soubriquets in the press of the Fastest Girl on Earth, and the Champion Lady Motorist of the World.

Levitt's book The Woman and the Car: A Chatty Little Handbook for all Women Who Motor or Who Want to Motor (1909), recommended that women should "carry a little hand-mirror in a convenient place when driving" so they may "hold the mirror aloft from time to time in order to see behind while driving in traffic". She also advised women travelling alone to carry a handgun; her recommendation was an automatic Colt, as, in her opinion, its relative lack of recoil made it particularly suitable for women.

Levitt's 1903 court case against a GPO van driver who had hit her car was another landmark: the first legal case in England won by the driver of a self-propelled vehicle.

== Background ==
Levitt was born Elizabeth Levi, in Hackney on 5 January 1882. She was the daughter of Jacob Levi, a prosperous jeweller, tea dealer, and Commission Agent of Colvestone Crescent, Hackney. Dorothy's mother was born Julia Raphael in Aldgate on 31 October 1856 (or possibly 1858) and married Jacob Levi in March 1877. Jacob died in 1934 and Julia in 1942. Levitt had two sisters: Lilly, (6 March 1878 – 8 April 1879); and Elsie Ruby (1892–1959 or 1963). (Note: The ODNB entry gives the date of death as 1959 whereas Williams quotes 1963.) Levitt or Levit had been adopted as the anglicized family surname by 1901. Her family was of Sephardic Jewish descent.

Scant information is available about Levitt's life except indications that she was an experienced horse rider. She described remaining astride a galloping horse while it negotiated jumps in a steeplechase as easier than retaining a seat in a car being driven at speed. In 1902 she was employed as a secretary at the Napier & Son works in Vine Street, Lambeth, where she was engaged initially on a temporary basis. The Napier engineering company had been purchased by Montague Napier from the executors of his father's estate. After undertaking work for Selwyn Edge on his Panhard et Levassor racing car, Napiers diversified to manufacturing cars in 1899. At this time the British motor industry was only beginning to develop; even the suggestion of motor races on public roads caused an outcry with hill climbs and speed tests having to be undertaken on private land.

When or how Levitt met Edge is unclear, as several versions and nuances are reported and both she and Edge appear to have been "orientated towards self-publicity". Napier cars were driven by Edge in motor races and he piloted one to win the 1902 Gordon Bennett Cup, a race from Paris to Austria; while competing there he noticed the influence Camille du Gast's participation had in drawing media attention to French racing cars. One suggestion was that Edge was seeking an English version of du Gast to enhance the sale of British cars. Jean Williams, British sports historian, hypothesises it may also have been to initiate a similar strategy to that employed by Kodak to infer "even women" could manage it. Edge noticed Levitt, who was described by author Jean Francois Bouzanquet as a "beautiful secretary with long legs and eyes like pools", working in the Napier office and promoted her to become his personal assistant, as she fulfilled almost all of his criteria for a suitable woman to attract extra publicity for the company. (Note: Women motorists were very unusual around the start of the 20th century, so newspapers were generally guaranteed to include any news stories about them.)

Later newspaper accounts paint a "romantic history" for Levitt by reporting that when she was twenty her parents moved to the countryside and tried to arrange a marriage for her. Unhappy about their choice of prospective husband, she absconded. While her parents searched fruitlessly for her, she became acquainted with Edge, who advised her to develop a career.

Edge's influence on her career was enormous, having recognised her spirit he instigated her career in motoring, arranged her training in Paris, provided her cars in order to promote his dealerships and supplied her motor boats. She is presumed to have also been his mistress for a time.

== Pioneer feminist and female motorist ==
The turn of the 20th-century saw a transition from the more austere Victorian era towards the dynamics of Edwardian times; transport methods were beginning to change yet there remained little opportunity for men to race motors so women driving was almost unheard of. Levitt had to be taught to drive and Leslie Callingham, a young salesman employed by Napiers, was instructed to undertake the task during his day off work. Fortunately Levitt was a fast learner as Callingham disliked her intensely and was affronted at having to teach a woman to drive. Cars were entered in official trials to accumulate performance information for possible buyers; only the company driver and an official were permitted in the vehicle. The driver was required to undertake any necessary maintenance during the proceedings so Edge had to ensure Levitt was also proficient in mechanics. In later interviews, Levitt described how after Edge advised her to make a career in automobiles, he arranged a six-month apprenticeship to a French automobile maker in Paris, where she learned all aspects of building and driving cars. On her return to London she began teaching women how to drive, reportedly teaching Queen Alexandra, the Royal Princesses (Louise, Victoria and Maud), other ladies of nobility and female American tourists.

=== 1903 ===
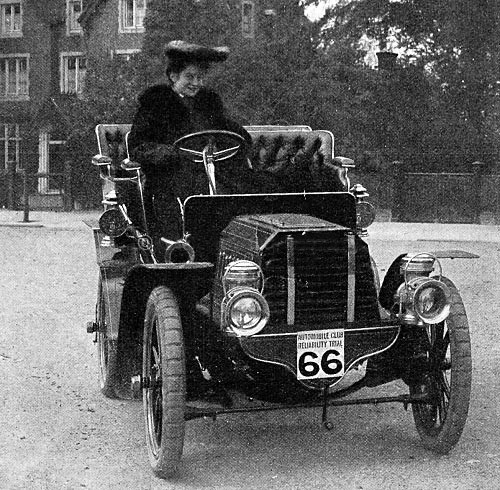
Dorothy Levitt and the 12 hp Gladiator car she drove in a series of reliability trials in 1903

Levitt's introductory experience competing in a motor race took place in April 1903, the first English woman driver ever to do so. She did not feature among the prize winners but determined that she would improve. Edge was the British agent for Gladiator vehicles and that was the marque driven by Levitt during the first year of her career. In May she piloted the 16 hp version in the four hundred mile Glasgow to London non-stop run, losing only six points out of a possible maximum of 1,000; the points reduction was due to having to stop to address a problem with the vehicle tyres. Her vehicle was a non-starter in the Sun-Rise Hill Climb near Edge Hill, Warwickshire on 25 July so on that occasion she accompanied Edge in his vehicle as official passenger. Levitt became the first British woman to take part in a speed competition when she made her début in speed races at the Southport Speed Trials where she won the class for cars priced between £400 and £550 in her four seater Gladiator. The heats were held on Friday 2 October and the finals on the Saturday when she covered the flying kilometre in a time of one minute forty-five seconds. At a time when purchasing cars was only within the reach of the aristocracy and the upper middle classes and women were expected to remain at home tending to their husband's needs, British society was astonished a woman working in a secretarial capacity was competing in a sport commonly believed to be a male discipline.

Typically, Edwardian women interested or involved in any mechanical disciplines were perceived to be masculine in outlook, temperament and style, who would also dress in utilitarian male type clothing. When du Gast competed in the ~1300km long Paris to Madrid 1903 road race, her face was almost entirely obscured by a mask and she wore a hat that featured ear flaps; her coat was leather and double breasted and she was assumed to be male until her voice revealed her gender. with regard to this, it must be considered that the driving conditions for the early long distance inter city races was appalling. The roads invariably being covered with rocks and loose stones and as protection from these and the dust clouds these fast cars also raised, all competitors wore face masks and heavy protective clothing, as period photographs confirm. Levitt, however, competing in perhaps less gruelling races dressed in flattering feminine outfits complete with co-ordinating hat and veil; a loose, lightweight coat, which became popularly known as a dust coat, afforded overall protection to her fashionable clothes.

Both Levitt's book and newspaper column in The Graphic described her atypical lifestyle for the Edwardian era: an independent, privileged, "bachelor girl", living with friends in the West End of London and waited on by two servants.

In the vernacular of the 1900s Levitt was a scorcher, a motorist who delighted in exceeding the speed limit and who therefore came to the attention of the police. On 6 November 1903, she was summonsed to appear at Marlborough Street Assizes for speeding in Hyde Park. According to the reported statement by the police she was said to have driven at a "terrific pace" and, when stopped, reportedly said that "[she] ... would like to drive over every policeman and wished she had run over the sergeant and killed him." Although she did not appear personally, the magistrate, Mr Denman, fined her £5 with 2s costs. The other six motoring defendants that day were only fined £2 plus costs. In November 1903, Levitt and her friend Hena Frankton claimed damages against a GPO van driver who had hit their car. In two discrete cases they received compensation of £35 each. This was celebrated as the first legal case in England which was won by the driver of a self-propelled vehicle.

=== 1904 ===
During 1904, Levitt suffered some ill health and spent time convalescing in Madeira.

In September Levitt drove an officially entered 8 horse-power De Dion car in the Hereford 1,000-mile (1,600 km) Light Car Trial, entirely alone, without mechanics. Her diary records that she "did everything myself, Had non-stop for five days." Only mechanical problems on the final day, which she repaired herself, prevented her from winning a gold medal.

The Times of 5 September 1904 reported:

It is satisfactory to note that no cars disappeared from the list, although one of the De Dions – the one driven by Miss Dorothy Levitt – which had up to Saturday afternoon run without any loss of marks, came to a standstill owing to a needle valve in the carburetter[sic] (which regulates the flow of petrol) getting loose and consequently closing. The trouble took more than the official 20 minutes to locate, with the result that not only did the car lose its chance of any non-stop award, but the fellow to it was also cut out, as similar cars have to run as a team. This was hard on both drivers after a week's work.

In October she won two medals at the Southport Speed Trials (Blackpool) driving a 50 horse-power Napier (or 20 hp). (Touring cars £750-£1200, second place behind Leon Bollee Syndicate (40 hp Léon Bolllée).

According to a November 1906 interview with the Penny Illustrated Paper Levitt balanced "the fearful excitement of automobile racing by quietly going fishing, and described trout fishing as her favourite sport. She also described poker as her favourite game and claimed significant expertise at roulette. Outlining her "most wonderful secret system with which she is going this winter to attempt to break the bank at Monte Carlo."

Levitt was noted for her ever-present, yappy, black Pomeranian dog called Dodo. A gift from Mademoiselle Marie Cornelle around 1903, he had been smuggled into England by being drugged and then hidden in the repair box of an automobile.

Levitt sometimes mixed at the highest social levels, such that her appearances were reported in advance in the Court Circulars of The Times. To wit her attendance at Major General Sir Alfred Turner's "Salon reception" at the Picadilly Hotel on 14 July 1909.

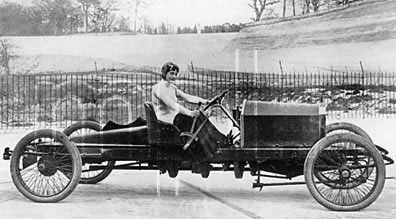
Dorothy Levitt, in a 26 hp Napier, at Brooklands, 1908

In the book The car and British society: class, gender and motoring, 1896–1939, Sean O'Connell described Levitt as "arguably the best known of the early women drivers" in an age when male prejudices against women drivers were typified by a 1905 item in Autocar that opined the hope that "the controlling of motor cars will be wrested from the hands of ... these would be men". Thus, in the preface to the first edition of her book The Woman and the Car: A chatty little handbook for all women who motor or who want to motor, the editor, C. Byng-Hall, stated that:

The public, in its mind's eye, no doubt figures this motor champion as a big, strapping Amazon. Dorothy Levitt is exactly, or almost so, the direct opposite of such a picture. She is the most girlish of womanly women.

She was described as "slight in nature, shy and shrinking, almost timid". Her book went on to state that "[there might] be pleasure in being whisked around the country by your friends and relatives, or ... chauffeur, but the real intense pleasure only comes when you drive your own car."

== Motor yachting ==
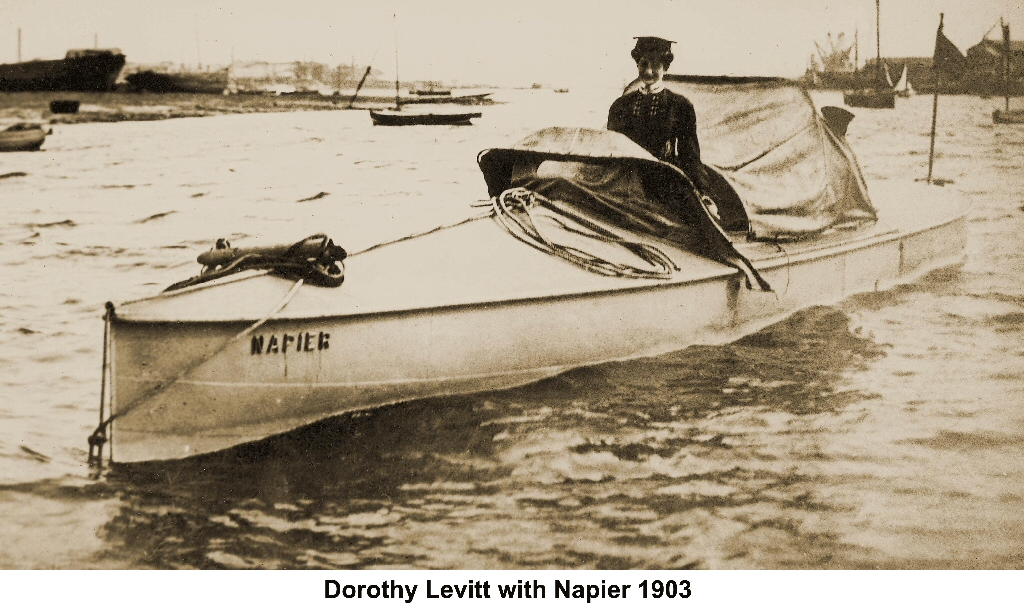
Dorothy Levitt driving the Napier motor yacht, 1903

In July 1903 (possibly the 12th), Levitt won the inaugural British International Harmsworth Trophy for motor-boats, defeating the French entry Trefle-A-Quatre. The event was officiated by the Automobile Club of Great Britain and Ireland and the Royal Victoria Yacht Club and took place at the Royal Cork Yacht Club at Cork Harbour in Ireland. Levitt set the world's first Water Speed Record when she achieved 19.3 mph (31.1 km/h) in a 40-foot (12 m) steel-hulled, 75-horsepower Napier speedboat fitted with a 3-blade propeller. Selwyn Edge was both the owner and entrant of the boat, and thus "S. F. Edge" is engraved on the trophy as the winner. The third crew member, Campbell Muir, may also have taken the controls. An article in the Cork Constitution on 13 July reported "A large number of spectators viewed the first mile from the promenade of the Yacht Club, and at Cork several thousand people collected at both sides of the river to see the finishes."

On 8 August 1903, Levitt drove the Napier motor-boat at Cowes and won the race. She was then commanded to the Royal yacht Albert & Victoria by King Edward VII where he congratulated her on her pluck and skill, and they discussed, among other things, the performance of the boat and its potential for British government despatch work.

Later in August she went to Trouville, France, and won the Gaston Menier Cup. This was reported as "a very competitive race, 'against the world's cracks'", and she won what was described as the "five-mile world's championship of the sea" and the $1,750 prize.

In October 1903 she returned to Trouville with the Napier motor-boat and won the Championship of the Seas. The French government, like King Edward VII, saw the merit of the design, so went ahead and bought the boat for £1,000.

== Sporting motoring ==
=== 1905 ===
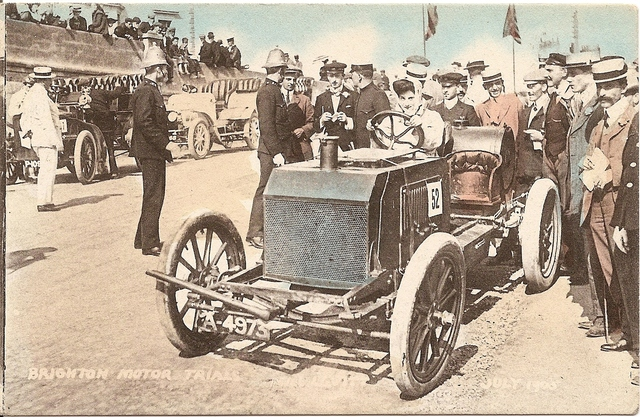
Dorothy Levitt driving a Napier at the inaugural Brighton Speed Trials in July 1905, setting a new Ladies World Land Speed record of 79.75 miles an hour, as well as winning her class and the Autocar Challenge Trophy

In February Levitt established the record for the "longest drive achieved by a lady driver". She drove an 8-horse-power De Dion-Bouton from London to Liverpool and back in two days, without the aid of a mechanic but accompanied by an official observer, her pet Pomeranian dog Dodo, plus a revolver. On 29 March 1905 she departed from the De-Dion showroom in Great Marlborough Street London at 07:00, reached Coventry at 11:36 94 miles (151 km), and arrived at the Adelphi Hotel in Liverpool (the home of her maternal grandmother) at 18:10, having completed the 205 miles (330 km) in a little over 11 hours. The following day she completed the return journey. Her diary records that February 1905 – Did Liverpool and back to London in two days, averaging a level 20 miles per hour throughout for the entire 411 miles.

In May she won a Non-stop Certificate at the Scottish Trials driving her eight horse-power De Dion. In her diary she noted that these trials "Ran over very rough and hilly roads in the Highlands."

In July Levitt set her first Ladies World Speed record when competing at the inaugural Brighton Speed Trials, in which she drove an 80 hp Napier at a speed of 79.75 miles per hour. She won her class, the Brighton Sweepstakes and the Autocar Challenge Trophy. Her diary records that she "Beat a great many professional drivers .... Drove at rate of 77.75 miles in Daily Mail Cup."

She also drove a 100 hp (74.6 kW) development of the Napier K5 at the Blackpool Speed Trials.

Her success and skills meant that she was offered a works drive in a French Mors in the inaugural RAC Tourist Trophy Race on the Isle of Man, but she was prohibited from accepting by Selwyn Edge, to protect the reputation of his Napier marque. Ironically the 208-mile (335 km) 1905 event was won by Mr. J. S. Napier in his Arrol Johnson car, ahead of 40 competitors.

=== 1906 ===
The highlight of Levitt's year was at the Blackpool Speed Trial in October when she broke her own Women's World Speed Record (which she set at the Brighton Speed Trials in 1905). She recorded a speed of 90.88 mph (146.26 km/h) over a flying kilometre, driving the 100 hp (74.6 kW) development of the Napier K5-L48. Thus, she was described as the "Fastest Girl on Earth"' and the "Champion Lady Motorist of the World". Her diary recorded:

Broke my own record and created new world's record for women at Blackpool. Ninety horse-power six cylinder Napier. Racing car. Drove at rate of 91 miles an hour. Had near escape as front part of bonnet worked loose and, had I not pulled up in time, might have blown back and beheaded me. Was presented with a cup by the Blackpool Automobile Club and also a cup by S. F. Edge, Limited.

— Dorothy Levitt. October 1906.

Dorothy's diary records : June 1906 – Shelsey Walsh Hill Climb Worcestershire. Was only sixth at finish. Fifty horse-power Napier. Mine was only car competing which was not fitted with non-skids [tyres]. Car nearly went over embankment owing to this and greasy state of roads. In the Open Class she set the Ladies' Record in a 50 hp Napier (7790 cc), making the climb in 92.4 seconds, 12 seconds faster than the male winner and around three minutes faster than the previous record set by Miss Larkins. Her record stood until 1913.

In July she competed at the Aston Clinton Hillclimb, near Tring in Buckinghamshire, finishing third on a 50 horse-power Napier.

She was unsuccessful in a challenge run against a White Motor Company steam car driven by Frederic A. Coleman of Camden, London.

In November 1906, after setting her new world record, Levitt was the subject of a full page profile in the national Penny Illustrated Paper that was headlined – The Sensational Adventures of Miss Dorothy Levitt, – Champion Lady Motorist of the World. In the article she described her career and spoke of the sensations of travelling at the "awful pace" of world record speeds.

Wonderful. One can hardly describe one's sensations. There is a feeling of flying through space. I never think of the danger. That sort of thing won't do. But I know it is omnipresent. The slightest touch of the hand and the car swerves, and swerves are usually fatal. But I am a good gambler, and always willing to take the chance. In going that pace, the hardest thing is to keep in the car. Half the time the wheels don't touch the ground at all, and when they do touch you must be prepared to take the shock and lurch, else out you will go. It is far harder work to sit in the car than to ride a galloping horse over the jumps in a steeplechase. When I made the records I was in the car alone. I prefer it.

— Dorothy Levitt, November 1906.

=== 1907 ===
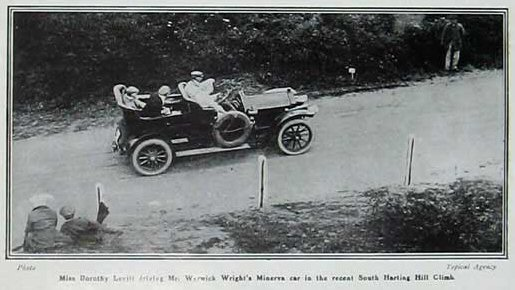
Dorothy Levitt drives Warwick Wright and guests in his Minerva in the 1907 South Harting, West Sussex, hill climb

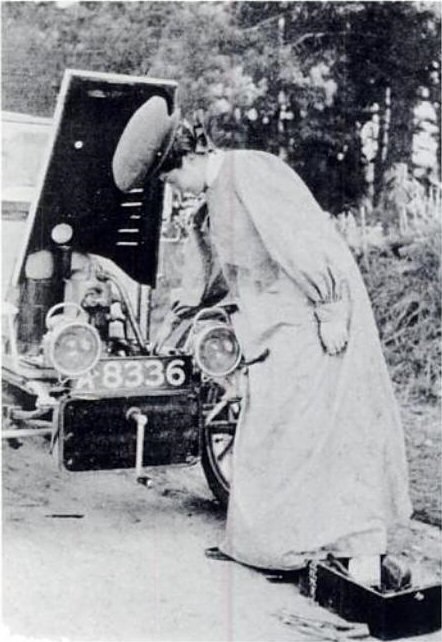
Dorothy Levitt priming a carburetor and wearing an early version of a motoring 'duster' coat

In 1907, the newly opened Brooklands circuit would not accept her entry, even though she was vouchsafed by S. F. Edge, and it continued to reject women drivers until the following year. Thus, she set her sights on Europe, and achieved great success in France and Germany driving for Napier.

In May, she finished second in the Appearance Competition at the Bexhill on Sea Speed Trial along the sea front. She was driving her Eight horse-power De Dion.

In June, she won a Gold Medal at the Herkomer Trophy Race (1,818 kilometres) in Germany (founded by Sir Hubert von Herkomer), finishing fourth out of 172 competitors, and the first of all women in all competitions. Her diary records that she drove a "Sixty horse-power six-cylinder Napier. There were 42 cars with much larger engines than I had."

In October, she won her class in the Gaillon Hillclimb in France, driving a 40 hp 6-cylinder Napier. In her diary she noted that "Won in my class by 20 seconds. Gradient of hill 1 in 10 average."

=== 1908 ===
Her 1908 schedule was hectic and successful and Brooklands began to allow lady competitors. In June she drove a 45 hp Napier to win a silver plaque in the Prinz Heinrich Trophy at the Herkomer Trophy Trial in Germany. Her diary states "Made absolute non-stop run on 45 horse-power Napier. Won large silver placque."

In July, her 60 hp Napier was second fastest of over 50 competitors at the Aston Clinton Hill Climb in Buckinghamshire.

In August, she competed at La Côte du Calvaire hill climb at Trouville, France.

== Pioneering aviation ==
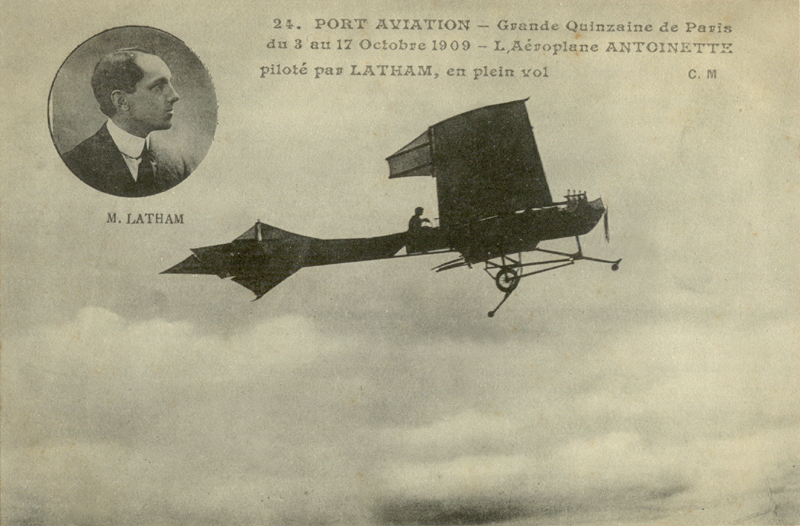
Hubert Latham and his Antoinette IV monoplane at the Grande Quinzaine de Paris, 3–17 October 1909. This was the type of aircraft in which Dorothy Levitt attempted to qualify for her pilot's licence.

In 1909 Levitt attempted to qualify as a pilot at the Hubert Latham School of Aviation at Châlons Camp Mourmelon-le-Grand, between Châlons-en-Champagne and Rheims in France. She attended along with Marie Marvingt and Baroness Raymonde de Laroche, the only woman ever licensed in the difficult to fly Antoinette monoplane. Levitt became a member of The Aero Club of the United Kingdom in January 1910, and was booked to give a talk at the Criterion Restaurant on Thursday, 3 March 1910 about her experiences learning to fly. According to the Oxford Dictionary of National Biography she learned to fly a Farman aircraft at a flying school in France in 1910, and by March she was interviewed in the Daily Chronicle about her flying experiences although there is no record of her having qualified.

== Journalism ==
Levitt became the leading exponent of a woman's "right to motor" and in 1909 published The Woman and the Car: A Chatty Little Hand Book for Women Who Motor or Want to Motor, based on her newspaper column in The Graphic. She also gave many lectures to encourage women to take up motoring.

She tried to counter the clichés about mechanically ignorant females:

I am constantly asked by some astonished people "Do you really understand all the horrid machinery of a motor, and could you mend it if it broke down? ... the details of an engine may sound complicated and look "horrid", but an engine is easily mastered.

In 1912 she received a byline for a column in the Yorkshire Evening Post on Saturday 3 August 1912 entitled "Motoring for Ladies : Some Commonsense Hints to Amateurs."

== Death ==
Levitt's career reflected that of several of her contemporaries with a meteoric rise to prominence before abruptly vanishing from public engagements, and her life after 1910 is undocumented. She was found dead in her bed at 50 Upper Baker Street on 17 May 1922 in Marylebone, according to probate granted on 27 September 1922. The death certificate named her as Dorothy Elizabeth Levi, unmarried, and stated that "the cause of death was morphine poisoning while suffering from heart disease and an attack of measles. The inquest recorded a verdict of misadventure." The beneficiary of her estate, valued at £224 2s 5d (equivalent to £11,000 in 2025 (Note: UK Consumer Price Index inflation figures from 1209–2024 based on data from "Inflation calculator", Bank of England, London, 18 February 2026)), was her sister Elsie. A plaque is now displayed at Levitt's birthplace on Colvestone Crescent. But the Blue Rebellion Plaque was stolen a year or so ago, and a new more pemanent one has been erected by the Jewish American Sociey for Historic Preservation, UK branch, donated by Jerry Klinger and initiated and organised by local Hackney historian Martin Sugarman with the kind coopertaion of Clarion Housing, the owners of the building. Dorothy is buried at Brighton Jewish cemetery under her true name Dorothy Elizabeth Levi.

== Historical Marker ==
Historical marker at 13 Colvestone Crescent where Levitt lived.
