= Cecil Husk =

British singer and medium (1847–1920)

Cecil Husk (1847-1920) was a British professional singer and spiritualist medium.

== Biography ==
Husk was a professional singer and member of the Carl Rosa Opera Company. His eyesight deteriorated and he became a full-time medium. It was alleged he could materialize spirits and perform psychokinesis.

In 1891 at a public séance with twenty sitters Husk was exposed as a fraud. He was caught leaning over a table pretending to be a spirit by covering his face with phosphor material. It was noted by investigators that the materializations of Husk had fine singing voices and sounded similar to himself. Husk also claimed to have the psychic ability to push his entire arm through an iron ring with a size that did not allow its passage over the hand, however, it was discovered that he performed the trick by using a local anesthetic on his hand.

Alfred Edward Turner attended séances with Husk. He became convinced that Husk could materialize spirits and defended the medium in various newspaper articles. During one of the séances he stated that he had witnessed the materialization of W. T. Stead.

The magician Will Goldston exposed the fraudulent mediumship of Husk. During a séance that Goldston attended a pale face materialization appeared in the room. Goldston wrote that "I saw at once that it was a gauze mask, and that the moustache attached to it was loose at one side through lack of gum. I pulled at the mask. It came away, revealing the face of Husk."
