= The Woman and the Car =

Book by Dorothy Levitt

The Woman and the Car: A Chatty Little Handbook for all Women Who Motor or Who Want to Motor
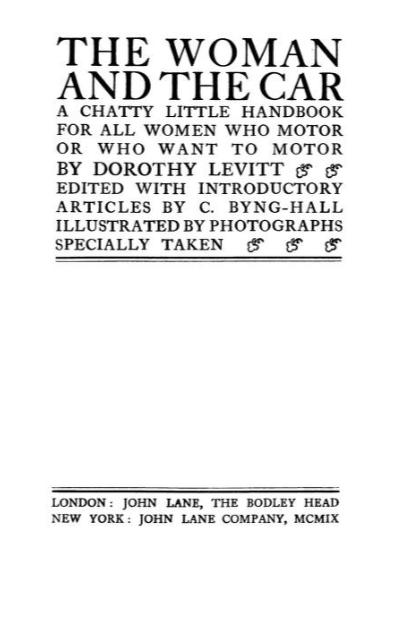
- Title page for The Woman and the Car: A Chatty Little Handbook for all Women Who Motor or Who Want to Motor (1909)
- Author: Dorothy Levitt
- Language: English
- Genre: Non-fiction
- Publication date: 1909
- Publication place: United Kingdom

The Woman and the Car: A Chatty Little Handbook for all Women Who Motor or Who Want to Motor is a book by Dorothy Levitt, first published in 1909.

== Autobiographical background ==
From 1903 until 1908 Levitt wrote a motoring column for The Graphic, an illustrated weekly newspaper, a series that formed the basis of The Woman and the Car. Levitt's handbook was not the first targeted at women motorists – English writer Eliza Davis Aria had published Woman and the Motorcar: Being the Autobiography of an Automobilist in 1906 for instance – but it was the most widely circulated of its day and the Ladies Automobile Club, which Levitt recommended, had been founded in 1903.

== Contents ==
In her introductory chapter Levitt sets the scene by explaining that she is not writing for the benefit of those women who have already taken to motoring; her target audience is instead "those [women] who would like to, but either dare not because of nervousness, or who imagine it is too difficult to understand the many necessary technical details". Photographs illustrating the topics that Levitt describes, including recommended motoring dress, adjusting the footbrake and changing a spark plug were taken by Horace Nicholls. Levitt covers topics such as starting a car, changing speed, motor manners and what to wear while driving.
