= Modesta Victoria =

Ship in Bariloche, Argentina

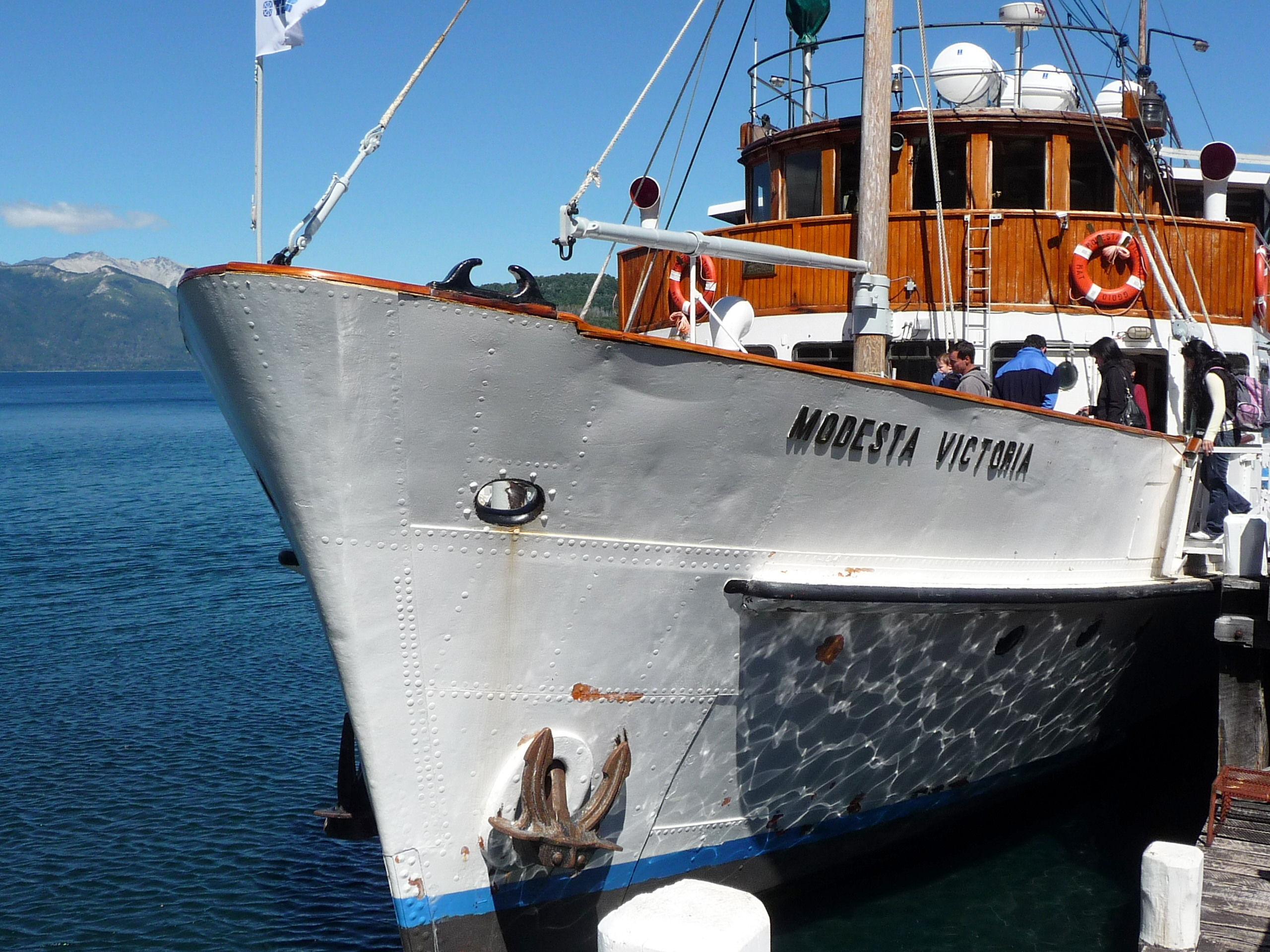

History

Argentina
- Name: Modesta Victoria
- Builder: N.V. Verschure & Co, Amsterdam
- Launched: 10 November 1938
- Maiden voyage: 12 January 1939, 1937
- In service: in active service, as of 2020
- Identification: LW 6358

General characteristics
- Tonnage: 207
- Length: 39 metre
- Decks: 3
- Installed power: 2 Volvo Penta Engines. output: 600 HP
- Capacity: Passengers: 300

Modesta Victoria is a passenger ship which travels on the Nahuel Huapi Lake inside the National Park of the same name in Río Negro, Argentina.

Modesta Victoria was built in 1937 in the Dutch shipyard N.V. Verschure & Co, and launched to the lake on 12 October 1938. In 1939, the ship began operations under National Parks Administration. Since 1969, she is owned by the tourism operator Turisur.

Modesta Victoria is named after a former vessel, Modesta de O'Connor which, under command of Lieutenant Eduardo O'Connor, became in 1883 the first vessel to enter the Nahuel Huapi Lake from the Atlantic Ocean, through the Limay River.

Personalities such as Barack Obama, Bill Clinton, Che Guevara, Dwight Eisenhower, Mohammad Reza Pahlavi (Shah of Iran) and his wife Farah Diba have traveled aboard Modesta Victoria.

== History ==
The ship was envisaged by the General Direction of Navigation and Ports. In November 1935, the National Parks Administration (directed by Exequiel Bustillo) started a public bid to purchase a ship for the Nahuel Huapi Lake, to be launched simultaneously with the Llao Llao Hotel. Five companies presented offers, four from Argentina and Verchure from the Netherlands. The latter won the bid. Construction started under supervision of Manuel Bianchi, an engineer who had been involved in the construction of the ARA Presidente Sarmiento. As a construction inspector, he filed over 700 acts of disagreement to different aspects of the ship construction.

The ship was constructed and assembled in Amsterdam, and then disassembled to be shipped by sea to Buenos Aires and from there, by rail until the lake in Bariloche. There, Modesta Victoria was re-assembled (also under supervision of Manuel Bianchi) and, using a dry dock nearby to the rail station, launched to the Nahuel Huapi Lake on 10 November 1938.

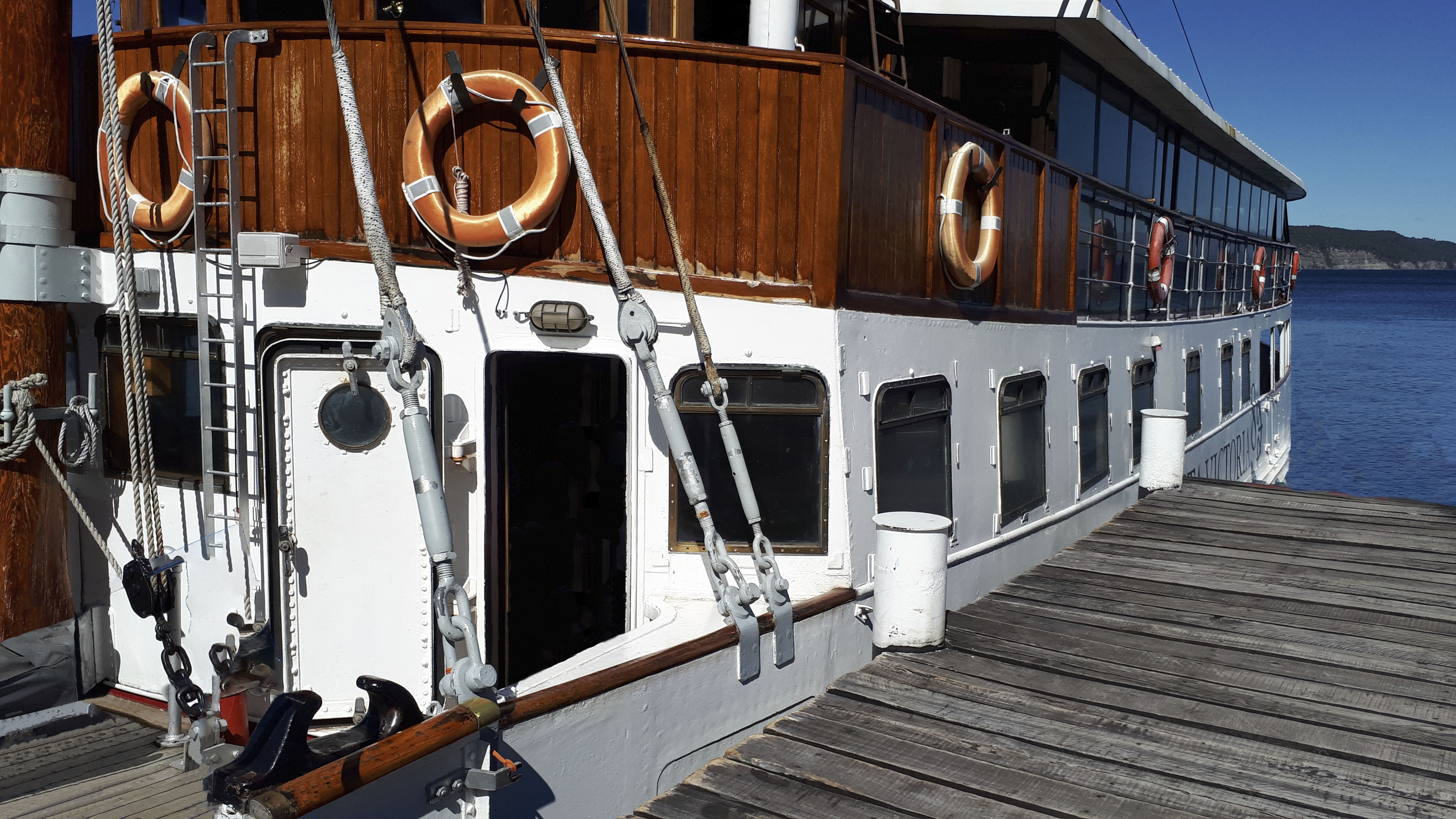
Close up of the ship

In January 1939, the ship began operations for the Villalonga Express Transport Company. The first journey was on 12 January 1939. By then, she was assigned to several routes in the lake: Puerto Blest, Victoria Island (then called Anchorena Island), La Angostura, and the Correntoso Hotel.

The vessel was transferred to the Argentina Naval Prefecture for a time, and then transferred back to the National Parks Administration.

In 1944, she transported the remains of Francisco Perito Moreno to his burial place at Centinela Island.

In 1968, the National Parks Administration ruled that the Modesta Victoria operation was losing money and launched a public bid to sell her. On 12 December 1968, the offers of the public tender were revealed and she was sold to Turisur, a tourism operator who made the only offer in the bid. The ship was sold on the terms that she is kept in good condition and continues to navigate the Nahuel Huapi. Modesta Victoria was refurbished and expanded by the new owner: a glass enclosure was made and the engines were replaced.

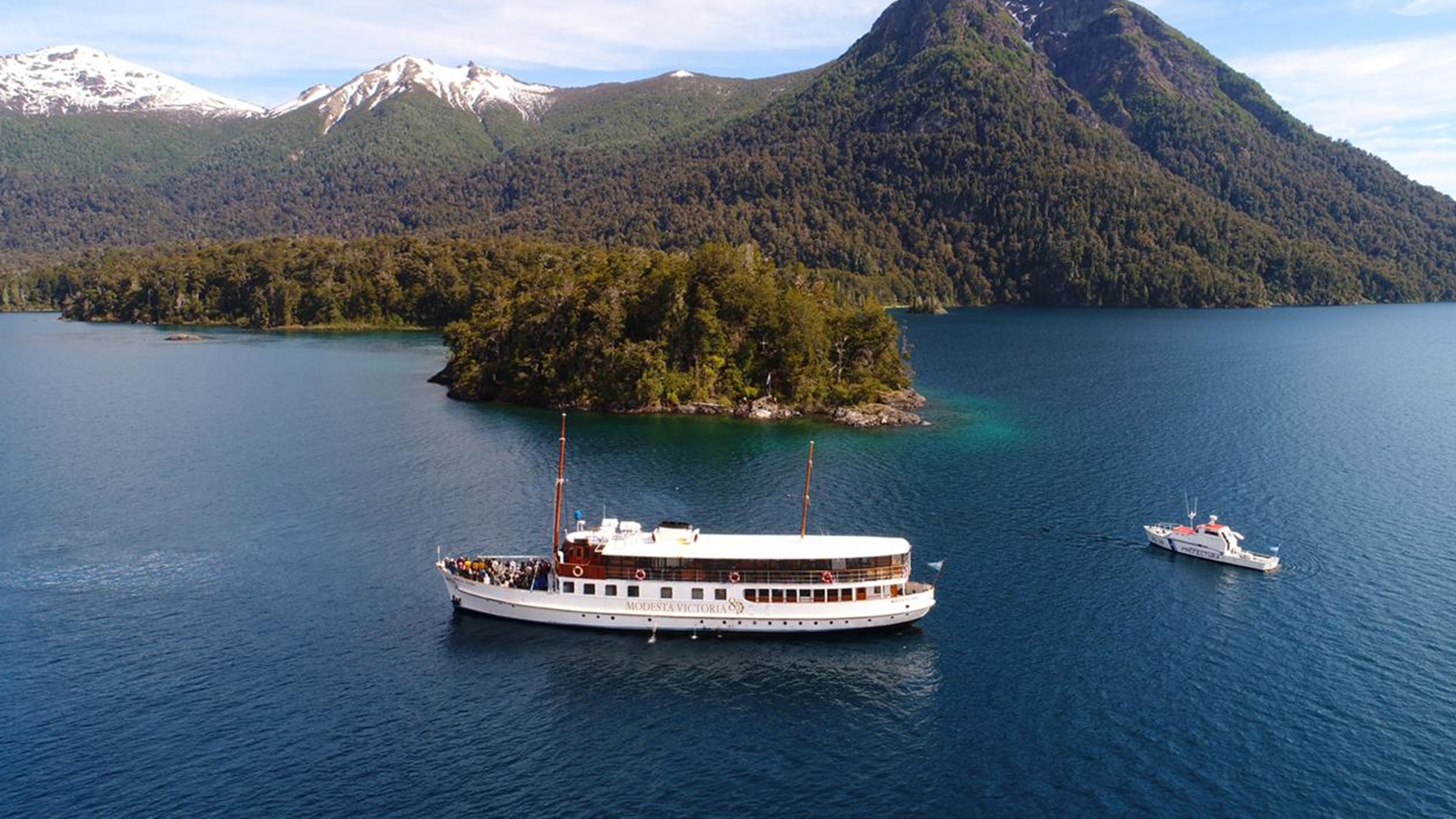
Modesta Victoria sailing the Nahuel Huapi Lake with Centinela island on the background

== Technical aspects ==
When Modesta Victoria was first built, the ship had a maximum capacity of 165 passengers. Nowadays, the vessel can carry up to 300 people.

She has three passenger decks, with teak floors, bronze fittings and alabaster lampshades.

Its original engines were also replaced to fit two Volvo Penta 300 hp engines, which power the ship nowadays.

== See also ==
- Nahuel Huapi National Park
- Nahuel Huapi Lake
