= Capraro =

Capraro is a surname. Notable people with the surname include:

- Albert Capraro (1943–2013), American fashion designer
- Primo Capraro (1873–1933), Italian-Argentine businessman
