= SS Hermanos =

Cargo ship

History
- Name: Hendrick Fisser V (1944-45); Empire Galbraith (1945-46); Highland (1946-59); Gowrie (1959-63); Hermanos (1963-69)
- Owner: Fisser & Van Doornum (1944-45); Ministry of War Transport (1945-46); Currie Line Ltd (1946-59); Dundee, Perth & London Shipping Line (1959-63); Cia Naviera Algeo SA (1963-69)
- Operator: Fisser & Van Doornum (1944-45); Currie Line Ltd (1945-59); Dundee, Perth & London Shipping Line (1959-63); G Vlassis & Co (1963-69)
- Port of registry: (Nazi Germany) Emden, Germany (1944-45); London, United Kingdom (1945-46); (United Kingdom) Leith (1946-59); (United Kingdom) London (1959-63); Piraeus, Greece (1963-69)
- Builder: Verschure & Co's Scheepswerft en Maschinenfabriek
- Yard number: 247
- Launched: 1944
- Completed: July 1944
- Out of service: September 1969
- Identification: United Kingdom Official Number 180694 (1945-63); Code Letters GNNS (1945-63); IMO number: 5420281 ( –1969)
- Fate: Scrapped

General characteristics
- Class & type: Hansa A type Cargo ship
- Tonnage: 1,923 GRT, 935 NRT, 3,120 DWT
- Length: 85.22 m (279 ft 7 in)
- Beam: 13.51 m (44 ft 4 in)
- Draught: 5.59 m (18 ft 4 in)
- Depth: 4.80 m (15 ft 9 in)
- Installed power: Compound steam engine, 1,200IHP
- Propulsion: Single screw propeller
- Speed: 10.5 knots (19.4 km/h)

Hermanos was a Hansa A Type cargo ship which was built as Hendrick Fisser V in 1944 by Verschure & Co's Scheepswerft en Maschinenfabriek, Amsterdam, Netherland for Fisser & Van Doornum, Emden, Germany. She was seized as a prize of war in 1945, passing to the Ministry of War Transport and renamed Empire Galbraith. She was sold in 1946 and was renamed Highland. A further sale in 1959 saw her renamed Gowrie. She was sold to Greece in 1963 and was renamed Hermanos. She served until 1969 when she was scrapped.

== Description ==
The ship was 85.22 m (279 ft 7 in) long, with a beam of 13.51 m (44 ft 4 in). She had a depth of 4.80 m (15 ft 9 in), and a draught of 5.59 m (18 ft 4 in). She was assessed as 1,923 GRT, 935 NRT, 3,400 DWT.

The ship was propelled by a compound steam engine, which had two cylinders of 42 cm (16 9/16 inches) and two cylinders of 90 cm (35 7/16 inches) diameter by 90 cm (35 7/16 inches) stroke. The engine was built by Verschure & Co's Scheepswerft en Maschinenfabriek. Rated at 1,200IHP, it drove a single screw propeller and could propel the ship at 10.5 knots (19.4 km/h).

== History ==
Hendrick Fisser V was a Hansa A Type cargo ship built in 1944 as yard number 247 by Verschure & Co's Scheepswerft en Maschinenfabriek, Amsterdam, Netherlands for Fisser & Van Doornum, Emden, Germany. She wascompleted in July 1944. Her port of registry was Emden.

In May 1945, Hendrick Fisser V was seized as a prize of war at Kiel in a damaged condition. She was passed to the Ministry of War Transport. She was renamed Empire Galbraith. The Code Letters GNNS and United Kingdom Official Number 180694 were allocated. Her port of registry was London and she was operated under the management of Currie Line Ltd, Leith.

In December 1946, Empire Galbraith was sold to Currie Line and was renamed Highland. She was sold to the Dundee, Perth & London Shipping Co Ltd in 1959 and renamed Gowrie.

In 1963, Gowrie was sold to Cia Naviera Algeo SA. Piraeus, Greece and renamed Hermanos. With their introduction in the 1960s, Hermanos was allocated the IMO Number 5420281. She was operated under the management of G Vlassis & Co. She served until 1969, arriving at Vado Ligure, Italy in September for scrapping, which happened in December.
