= Puerto Blest =

- Municipality and village
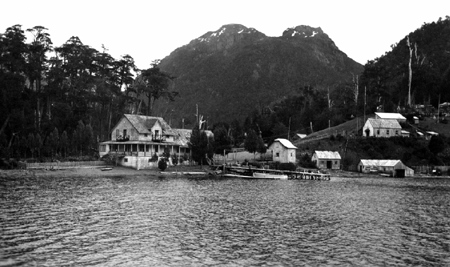

- Location within Argentina
- Coordinates: 41°02′S 71°49′W
- Country: Argentina
- Province: Río Negro Province
- Time zone: UTC−3 (ART)

Puerto Blest is a small port located on Lake Nahuel Huapi, at the end of the Blest Arm, in Río Negro Province in Argentina, located at the coordinates: 41 ° 01′27.16 ″ S 71 ° 48′49.80 ″ W. The port is located where the Frías river discharges into Lake Nahuel Huapi, within the Nahuel Huapi National Park at 808 meters above sea level, and is part of a tourist path that connects the city of Bariloche with Lake Frías and the Cántaros waterfall.
