= Gutiérrez River =

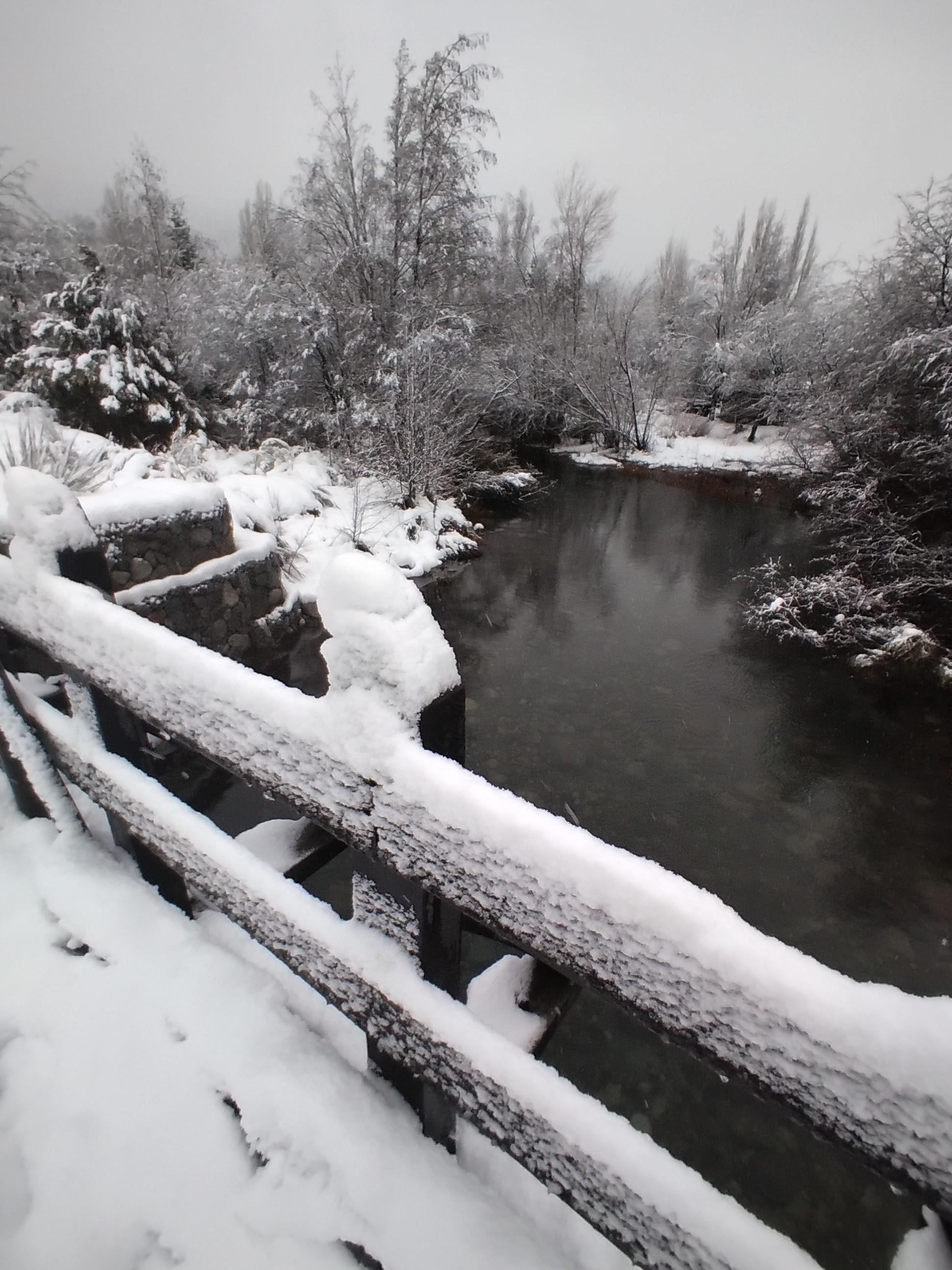

Location
- Country: Argentina

Physical characteristics
- Source
  - location: Gutiérrez Lake
  - elevation: 770 m (2,530 ft) AMSL
- Mouth
  - location: Río Negro
- Length: 4 km (2.5 mi)

The Gutiérrez River is a small river in the northwestern Argentine Patagonia (the region of Comahue). It is born at the northern end of the Gutiérrez and flows in a rect path for about 4 kilometres (2.5 mi) and ends on the Nahuel Huapi Lake.

This short river divides the city of Bariloche in two.

The river is also used for fly fishing, and cross a military camp in the middle of their path.
