= Nahuel Huapi National Park =

National park in Argentina

Nahuel Huapi National Park Parque Nacional Nahuel Huapi
- IUCN category II (national park)
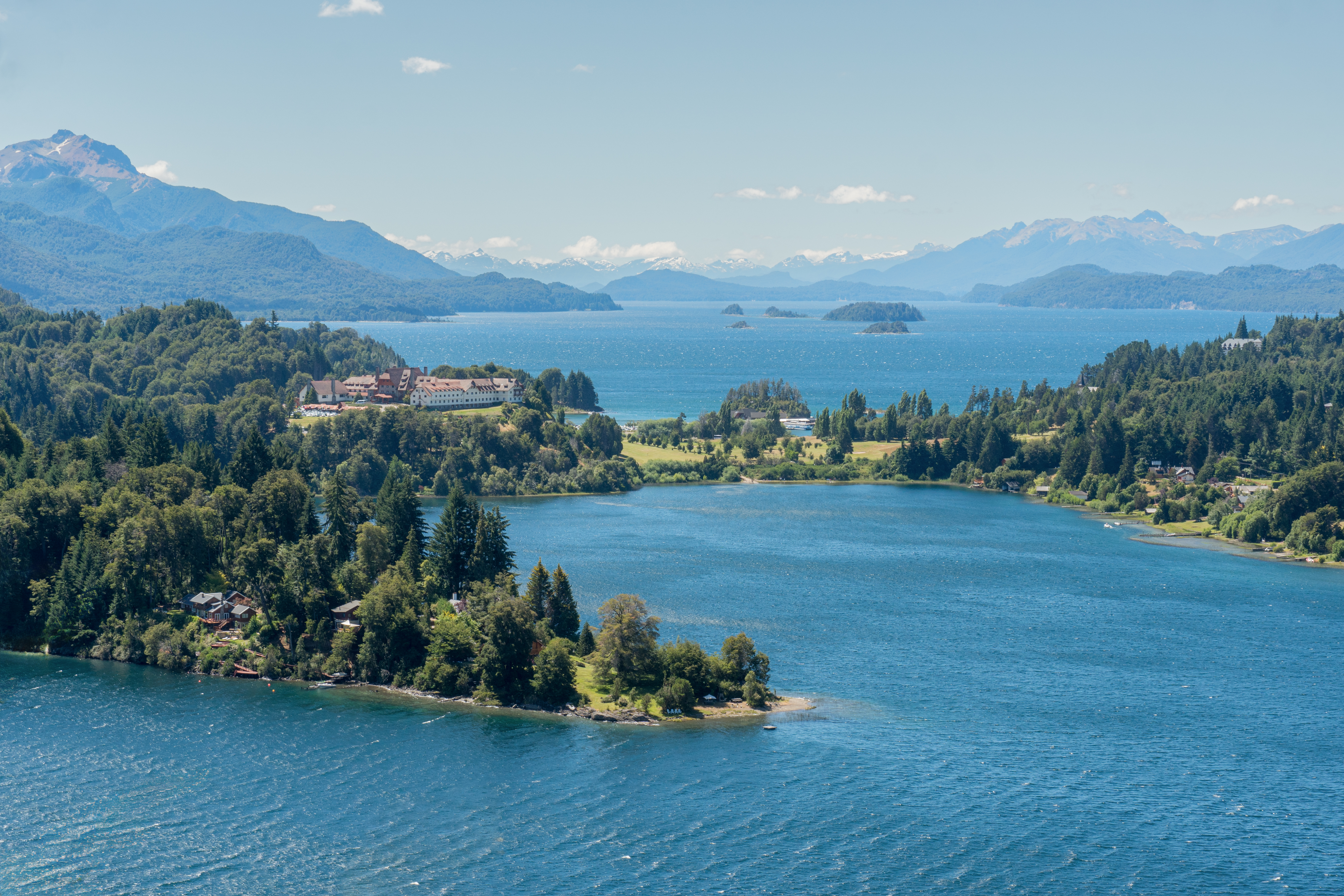
- Llao Llao peninsula

- Location within Argentina
- Location: Río Negro and Neuquén provinces, Argentina
- Nearest city: San Carlos de Bariloche and Villa La Angostura
- Coordinates: 41°00′S 71°30′W
- Area: 7,050 km^{2} (2,720 mi^{2})
- Established: 1934
- Governing body: Administración de Parques Nacionales

Nahuel Huapi National Park (Spanish: Parque Nacional Nahuel Huapi) is the oldest national park in Argentina, established in 1922 as Parque Nacional de Sud and reconfigured in 1934. It surrounds Nahuel Huapi Lake in the foothills of the Patagonian Andes. The largest of the national parks in the region, it has an area of 7,050 km^{2} (2,720 mi^{2}), or nearly 2 million acres. Its landscapes represent the north Patagonian Andean Zone consisting of three types, namely, the Altoandino (with perpetual snow above an altitude of 1,600 metres (5,200 ft)), the Andino-Patagónico (in the lower reaches of the hills), and the Patagonian Desert. It also represents small parts of the Valdivian Rainforest.

The park and the reserve lie at an elevation of 720–3,574 metres (2,362–11,726 ft), and are designated under IUCN management categories II (National Park) and IV (Management Reserve). The park is completely protected while the reserve is partially protected. The national park is dominated by the high mountain chain of the Andes, many lakes, rapid rivers, waterfalls, snow-clad peaks, glaciers and extensive forests. It is bordered by Chile on its western side.

== Etymology ==
The park derives its name from the lake which it surrounds, namely the "Nahuel Huapi". In the Mapuche language, Nahuel means "jaguar", and Huapi means "island".

Parque Nacional Nahuel Huapi (Map)

== History ==
The earliest discovery of Nahuel Huapi by the non-indigenous peoples is linked to the conquest of Chile. In the summer of 1552–1553, the Governor of Chile Pedro de Valdivia sent Francisco de Villagra to explore the area east of the Andes at the latitudes of the city of Valdivia. Francisco de Villagra crossed the Andes through Mamuil Malal Pass and headed south until reaching Limay River in the vicinity of Nahuel Huapi Lake.

In colonial times explorers in the search for the legendary "Ciudad de Los Cesares" visited the zone and Jesuit missionaries coming from Chiloé Archipelago established a precarious mission on the shores of the lake. Quinoa is known to have been cultivated near the shores of the lake during this period.

In the 1870s and 1880s Perito Moreno undertook a series of exploration trips into Patagonia. Later he worked for the Argentine government's boundary commission. In short —Perito Morenos‘ explorations and work were fundamental for securing Argentine sovereignty of the Nahuel Huapi area. As compensation for his services Perito Moreno was granted a huge tract of land around Nahuel Huapi Lake.

In 1903, Perito Moreno donated 75 square kilometres (29 mi^{2}) of land in the area to the federal government. At the same time he proposed the creation of a national park. A decree of February 1, 1909 recognized that the area needed protection then in 1916 works begun to establish a park and it finally opened in 1922 as Parque Nacional del Sur. The total surface of the incipient national park in 1916 surpassed that of the donations of Perito Moreno. It was not until October 9, 1934 that Nahuel Huapi National Park acquired it present name. At the same time in 1934 the Iguazú National Park was established in Argentina.

One of the main objectives of the civilizing visions of the National Parks Direction established in 1934 was the urban development of the small settlement of San Carlos de Bariloche on the shores of Lake Nahuel Huapi, which had been connected to the Argentine railway network in 1934. Bustillo clearly articulated the pretension of building a new orderly city that would act as a bulwark for the colonization of Patagonia, and placed it in a historical line that began with the war of conquest against the Mapuche at the end of the 19th century. Touristification was the main aim of the National Park Direction, establishing the luxury hotel Llao-Llao. In the first year of the National Park Service, 1935, several regulations were implemented that affected Nahuel Huapi. These included construction code, standardization of drinking water sanitation, and issuance of vendor permits. The area opened up for mountain climbing, sport fishing, ski and other recreational activities after the park was established.

== Geography ==
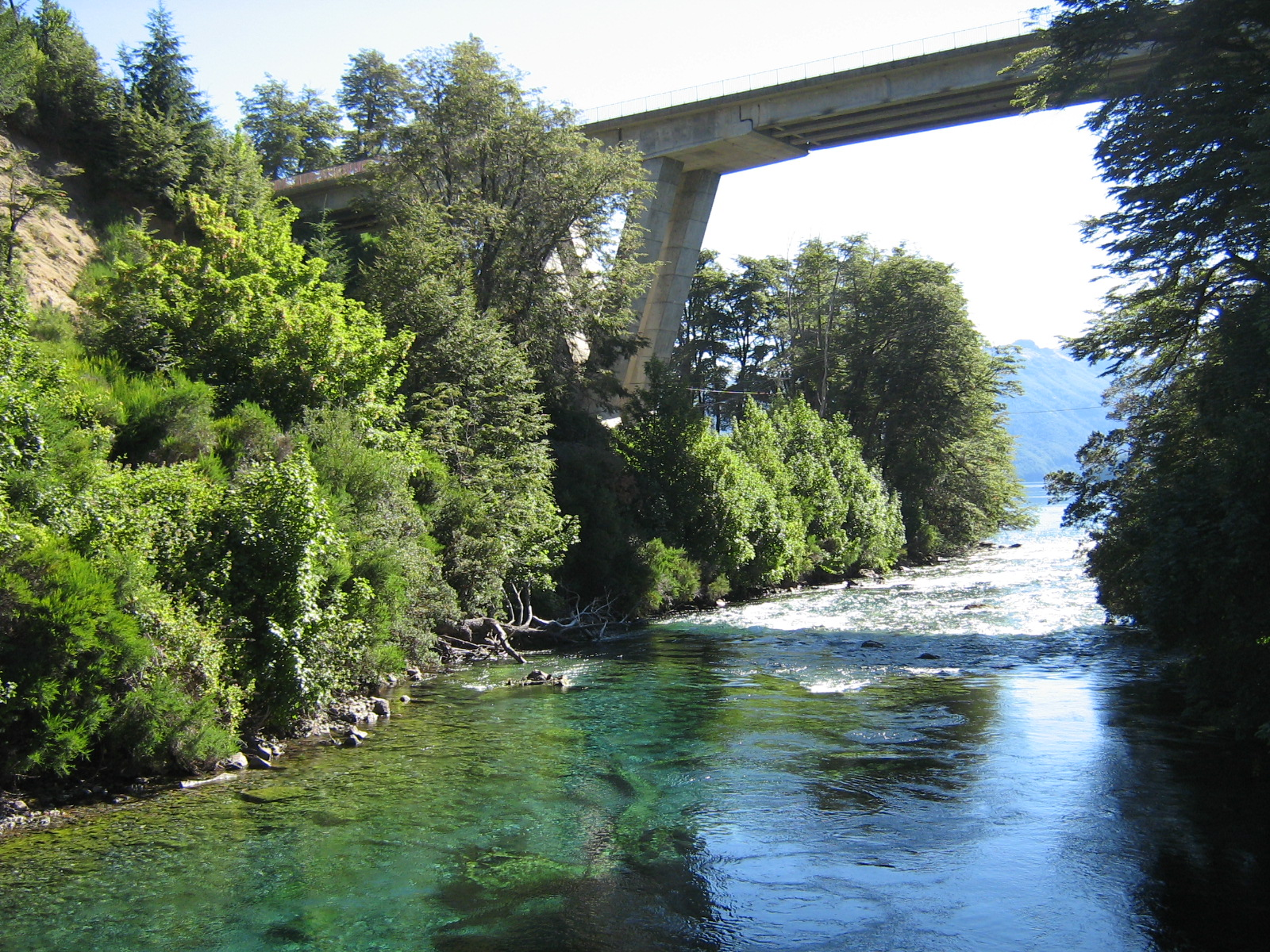
Route 231 bridge across the Correntoso River that flows into Lake Nahuel Huapi.

The park covers approximately 7,050 square kilometres (2,720 mi^{2}). It is located in the southwest section of the Neuquén and northwest section of the Río Negro provinces, bordering with Chile. The park has two zones: the park and the natural reserve with development concentrated in the reserve. The largest city and a base for tourism is San Carlos de Bariloche, which is surrounded by the park. San Carlos de Bariloche is the main hub when visiting the lake, and is known as the "Gateway to Patagonia", the "Chocolate Capital" and the "Honeymoon Capital" of Argentina. However, the city and other settlements are zoned outside the limits of the park. A further subzoning into the north, south and southern zones has been implemented with an exclusive recreational area named the Cerro Cathedral. Villa La Angostura is another lakeside resort also within the boundaries of the park.

The area is known as the Argentine Lake District, as there are many lakes in the park, including Nahuel Huapi, Mascardi, Gutiérrez, Traful, Guillelmo, Fonck and Perito Moreno Lakes. Cerro Catedral is a 2,388-metre-high (7,835 ft) peak within the park and an important ski resort. Cerro Tronador, on the Chilean border, is the highest mountain in the park at 3,491 metres (11,453 ft). Bordering the park to the north is the Lanín National Park.

Geology

Geological formations in the park and the reserve are generally tertiary rocks of volcanic origin coupled with andesites and porphyrys. The cliffs of the San Pedro Peninsula depict eroded glacial features and the lakes also show many glacial effects.

Climate

The park has a cold temperate climate. Winters are cold and rainy with frequent snowfalls. Mean temperatures range between 2 and 4 °C (35.6 and 39.2 °F) during winter. Summers are dry with mean temperatures ranging between 14 and 16 °C (57.2 and 60.8 °F). Mean annual precipitation ranges from 4,000 mm (160 in) in Puerto Blest and decreases towards the east, averaging only 600 mm (24 in) in the easternmost parts.

=== Lake Nahuel Huapi ===
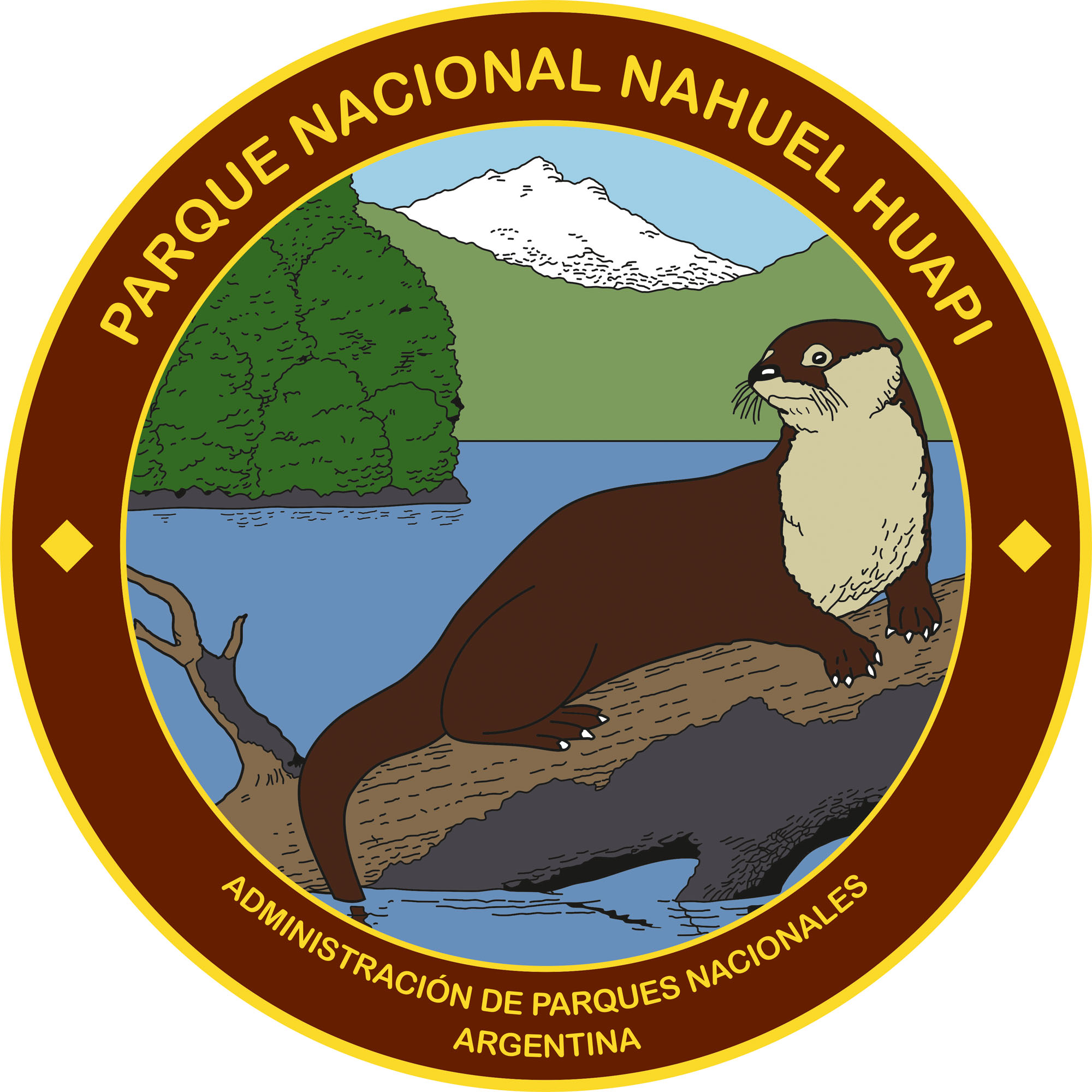
Park logo

Lake Nahuel Huapi is the largest and deepest clear water lake in the lake district of Argentina, with a depth of 425 metres (1,394 ft). Located at the foot of the Andes Mountains at an altitude of 767 metres (2,516 ft), it measures 544 square kilometres (210 sq mi). The lake was explored by the Jesuit priest Nicolás Mascardi in 1670 who also built a chapel on the Huemul Peninsula of the lake. The lake extends 100 kilometres (62 mi) across the border with Chile, and includes many fjords and the Valdivian temperate rain forest. The southern shore of the lake has many hotels and restaurant catering to the tourist industry. The Quetrihué Peninsula in the north of the lake has been set aside as a separate national park, Los Arrayanes National Park. The lake has many islands. The Forest Research station is located on one of them, Victoria Island, which is a natural reserve approachable by boats. Huemul Island hosted the Huemul Project, the Argentinean secret research project on nuclear fusion in 1949–1952.

=== Bariloche ===
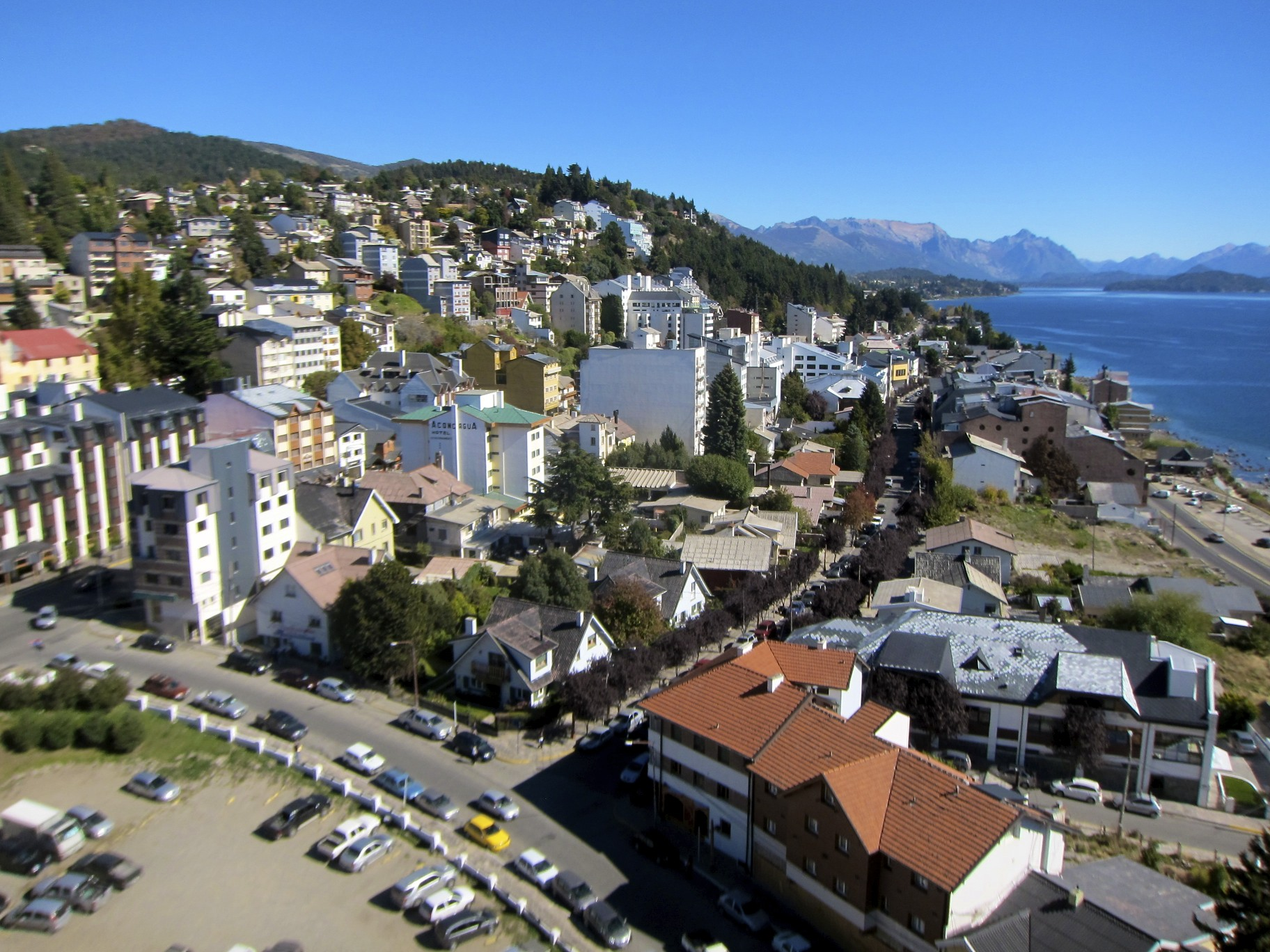
Bariloche on the Nahuel Huapi lakeshore

San Carlos de Bariloche is located on the southern shore of Lake Nahuel Huapi. The town was established in 1902. However, its importance as tourist hub grew after the 1930s when the national park surrounding it was established. It is well known as the "Honeymoon Capital of Argentina", apart from its fame for its chocolate manufacturing industry. Its 130 kilometres (81 mi) stretch below the Andes mountains is bounded on the south by Lago Mascardi and on the north by the Villa Traful. North of the city the Seven Lakes road provides scenic vistas of landscapes. Glaciers and waterfalls, which are near to the Pampa Linda, are located to the west of Bariloche. It is also the base for mountaineering trips to 3,554-metre-high (11,660 ft) Mount Tronador (also known as the Thunderer as ice falling produces such sounds) of extinct volcanic origin. The town is well-connected by air, rail and road transport; the airport is 15 kilometres (9.3 mi) to the east of the town; and the train and bus stations are 3 kilometres (1.9 mi) to the east. The Cerro Catedral mountain peak is the snow sports center, with many skiing runs, which is 23 kilometres (14 mi) from Bariloche.

== Plants and animals ==
The park's ecology consists of Patagonian steppe at lower elevations and Valdivian temperate forests at higher elevations. It is notable for its rich wildlife due to its many biotopes, attributed to the varied altitude and precipitation range.

The dominant species of plankton in the lake is Dictyosphaerium pulchellum.

Plants

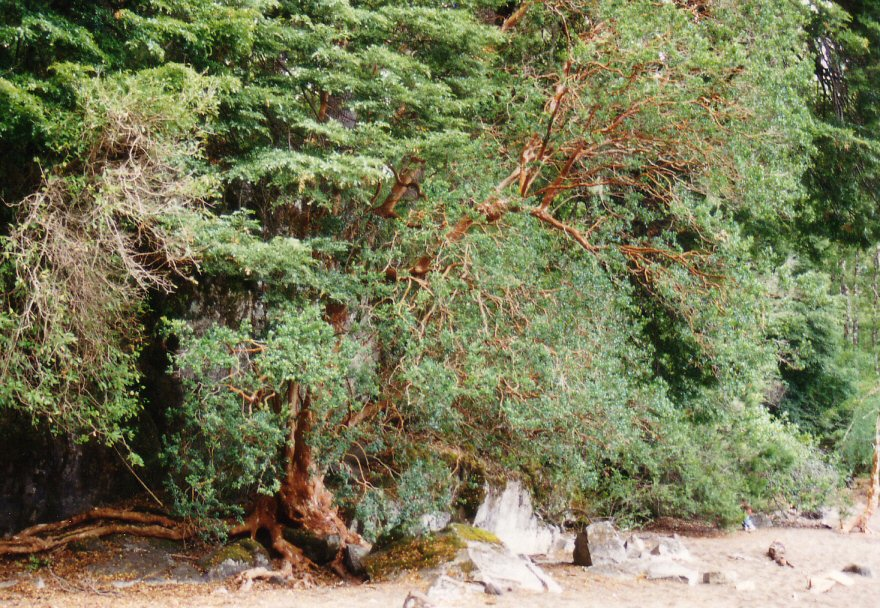
Nothofagus and Luma apiculata (red bark), two trees types common the national park.

Xerophytic Patagonian flora is dominant in the eastern half of the park while the western half is covered profusely with temperate rain forests. The dominant tree species in the park are the lengas, coihue, and the ñires. Other varieties of trees seen in the park are the Chilean cedar (Austrocedrus chilensis), Winter's bark (Drimys winteri), Myrceugenella apiculata, Lomatia ferruginea, Lomatia hirsuta, Alstroemeria aurantica, Fuchsia magellanica, bamboo Chusquea culcou, Mitraria cocinea and Embothrium coccineum. The alerce or Patagonian cypress is a slow-growing conifer which is also present. Other flora include arrayanes, coihues, ferns, the caña colihue reeds, amancayes and arvejillas. The llao llao fungus has irregular growth patterns on the trees and is a symbol of the area; it is also the name of the Llao Llao Hotel, a famous resort. The Valdivian rain forests is well forested with fine arrayan trees with crumbling bark. In the high rain fall zones close to the Chilean border there is profusion of 450-year-old coihue trees (small leaved evergreen beeches). Fitzroya (Spanish: Alerce) of 1500 year's age scattered throughout the park. Chusquea canes grows in abundance.

Animals

Animals include river otters (Lontra provocax), southern Andean huemuls (Hippocamelus bisulcus), pudus (small deer), foxes, cougars, guanacos and maras. Huillin (Lontra provocax), an endangered native otter, has been reported in the park. Birds reported include Magellanic woodpeckers, green austral parakeets, geese, ducks, swans, blue-eyed cormorants, Andean condors (Vultur gryphus) and green-backed firecrowns (Saphonoides sephaniodes). Amphibian fauna reported are Hylorina sylvatica and Bufo spinolosus. Five genera and 32 species of Simuliidae (black fly) have been recorded. These genera are Cnesia, Cnesiamima, Gigantodax, Paraustrasimulium, and Simulium (Pternaspatha), a subgenus of Simulium with 19 species; these account for 57% of the Simuliidae fauna found in Argentina.

Nahuelito is a lake monster named after the Nahuel Huapi Lake as its sighting in the lake is reported widely. Whether it is a fact or fiction, its sighting has been reported by local people and tourists with widely varying descriptions mentioning a “giant water snake with humps and fish-like fins to a swan with a snake's head, the overturned hull of a boat, and the stump of a tree”. Its length is also reported in the range of 15–150 feet (4.6–45.7 m). Reported widely since the 1920s, predating Nessie and the book titled The Lost World (Arthur Conan Doyle), Nahuelito is described as “an Argentinean media star”.

== Recreation ==
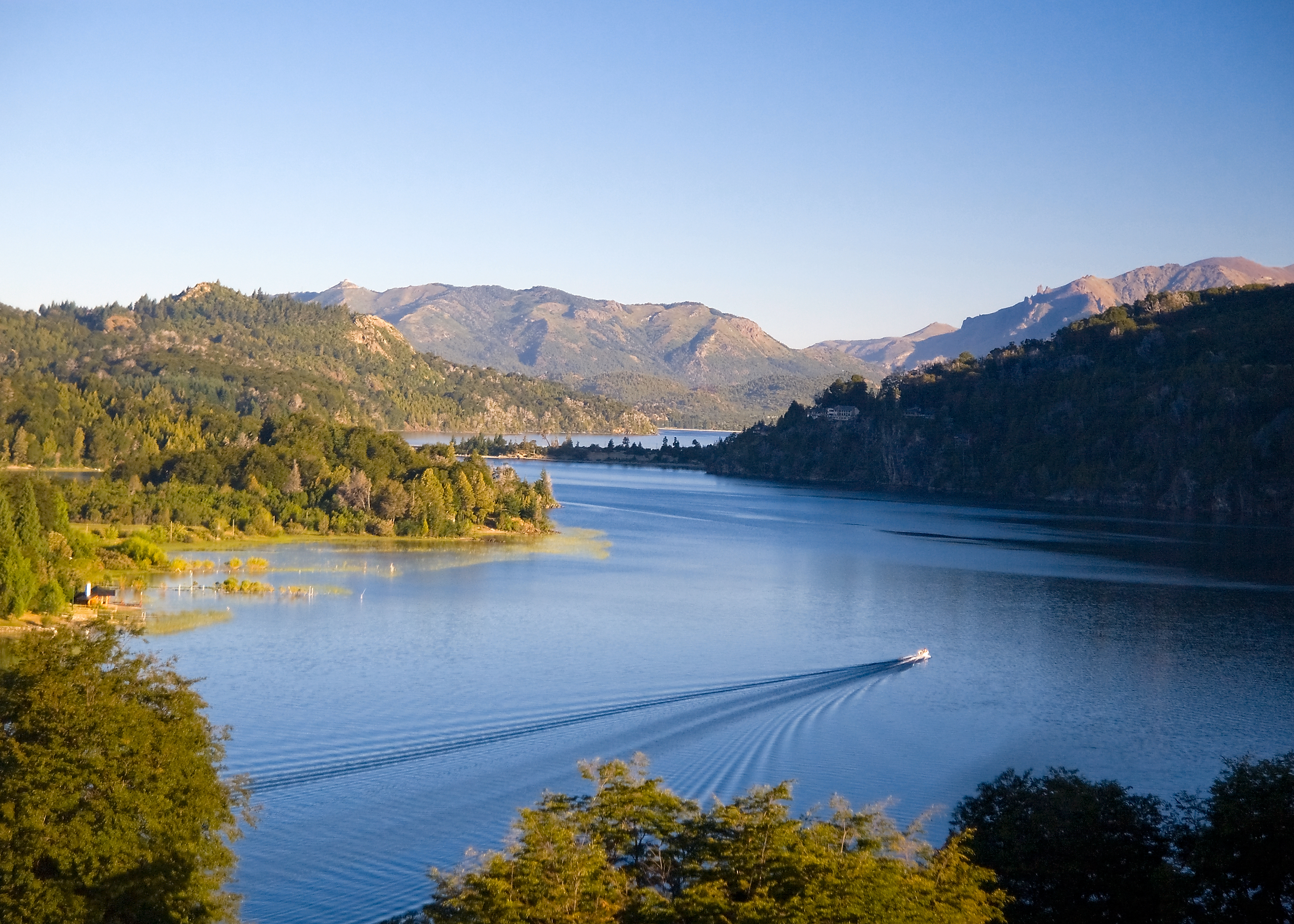
Recreation in the Nahuel Huapi Lake in Llao Llao

The park offers many avenues for recreation. Particular places of interest in this context are the Arrayanes Peninsula, Tronador, Puerto Blest, Victoria Island and the road to the 7 Lakes. Other options for recreation are available at the Cerro Bayo, Lopez and Punta Negra. Most of the recreation facility revolves around trekking of high mountain and steep hills apart from rafting, skiing in Cerro Catedral, kayaking in Patagonia Infinita, mountain biking, rock-climbing, kite surfing, canopy, golf at Llao Llao, trekking on a number of routes, ferry services from Villa la Angostura.

Some of the well-developed routes for mountaineering are: The climb to the Thunderer volcano, which has several trails that reach up to the large glaciers; trails to the Tronador (an extinct volcano); the trails that link the San Martin shelter and Manfredo Segre (Black Lagoon); treks to San Martín and Manfredo Segre (Laguna Negra); to Lopez and to the viewpoint of the Stone of Habsburg, the walk of Paso de las Nubes Puerto Frías linking to Pampa Linda; to the valley and the ridge of Mount Rucaco Black Gap; and to Frey and San Martín (Jakob lagoon), which passes by the edge of Cerro Catedral.

The trekking routes have accommodation facilities at several locations and the treks depend on fitness and the distance varies from a minimum of 12 kilometres (7.5 mi) to a maximum of 45 kilometres (28 mi) involving 1-2-3 and more than 4 days of trekking. The treks are graded under four categories depending on the terrain and the difficulty of climbing rugged hills of heights varying from 200 to 3,000 metres (660 to 9,840 ft).

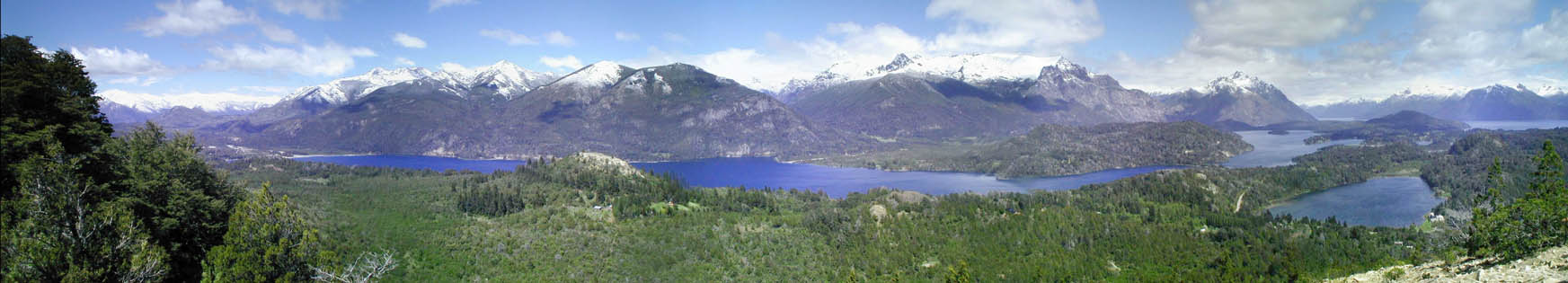
Cerros Catedral, López and Capilla, and lakes Moreno and Nahuel Huapi, as seen from Cerro Campanario.

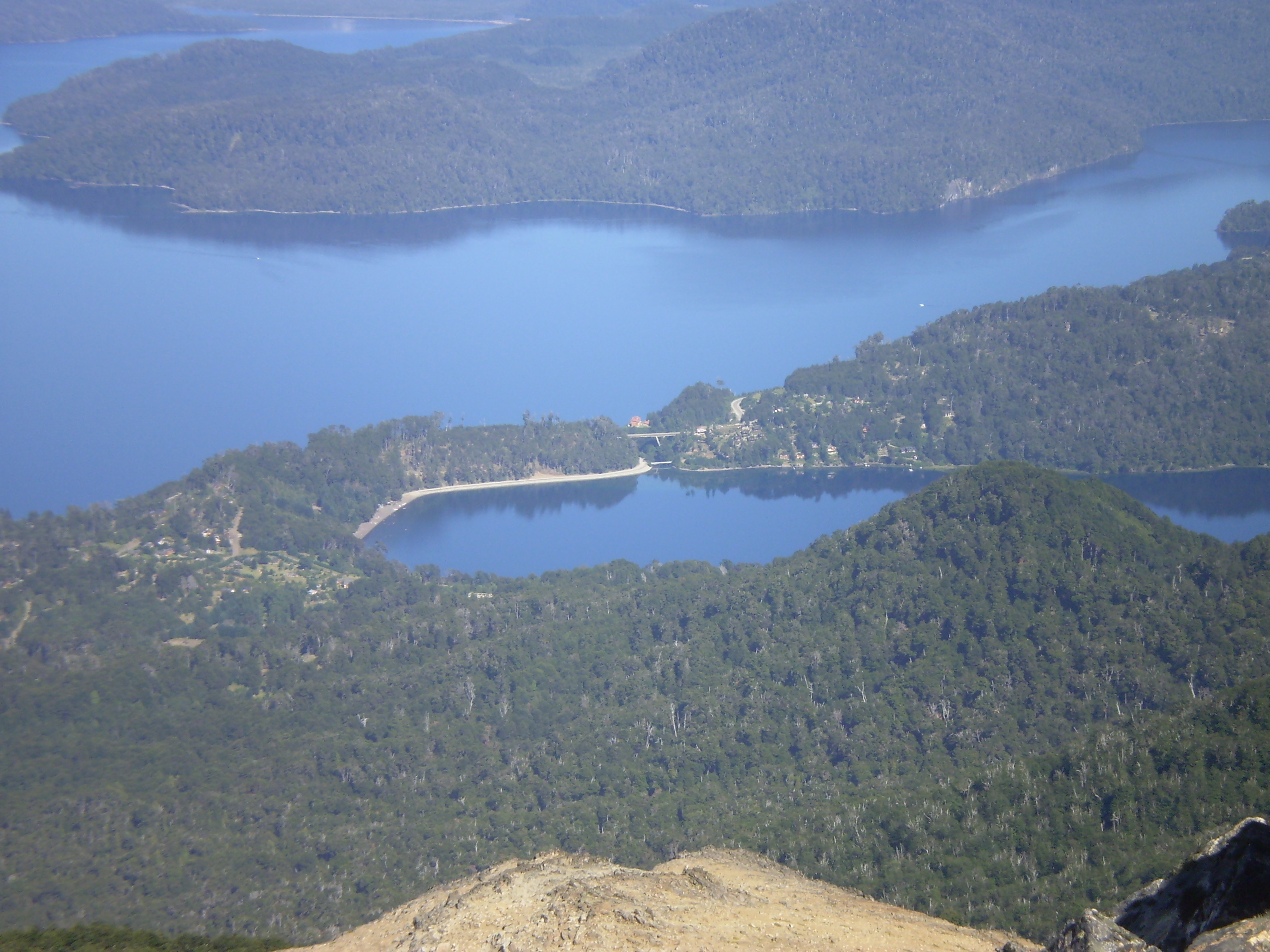
Lago Correntoso

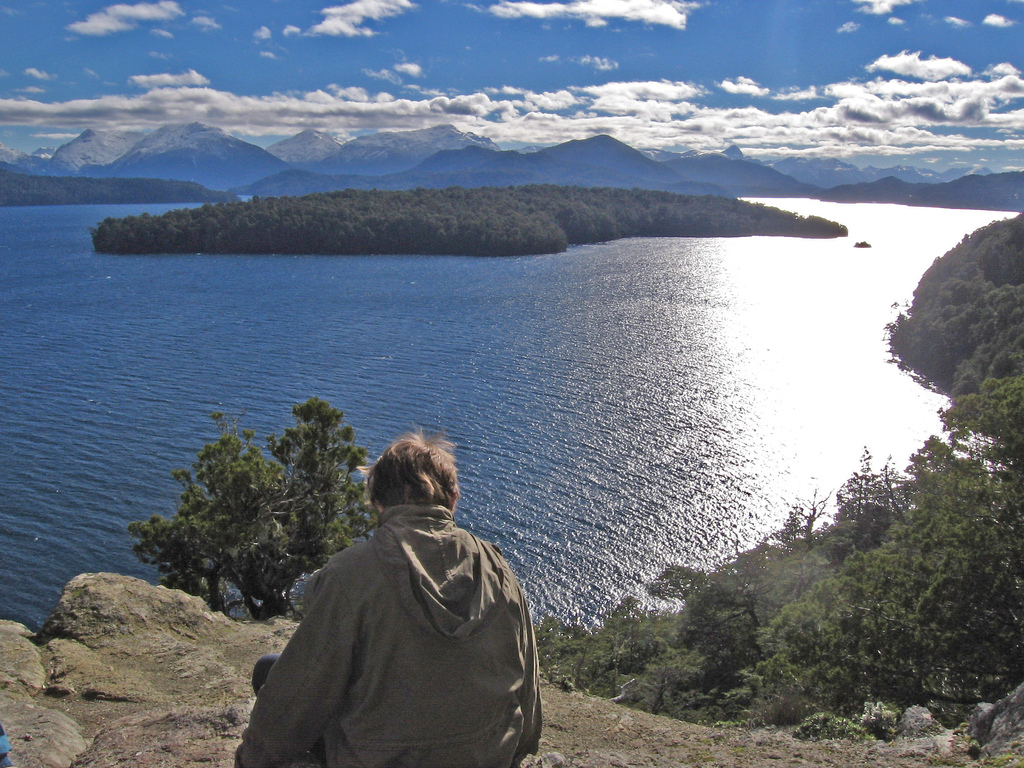
La Angostura

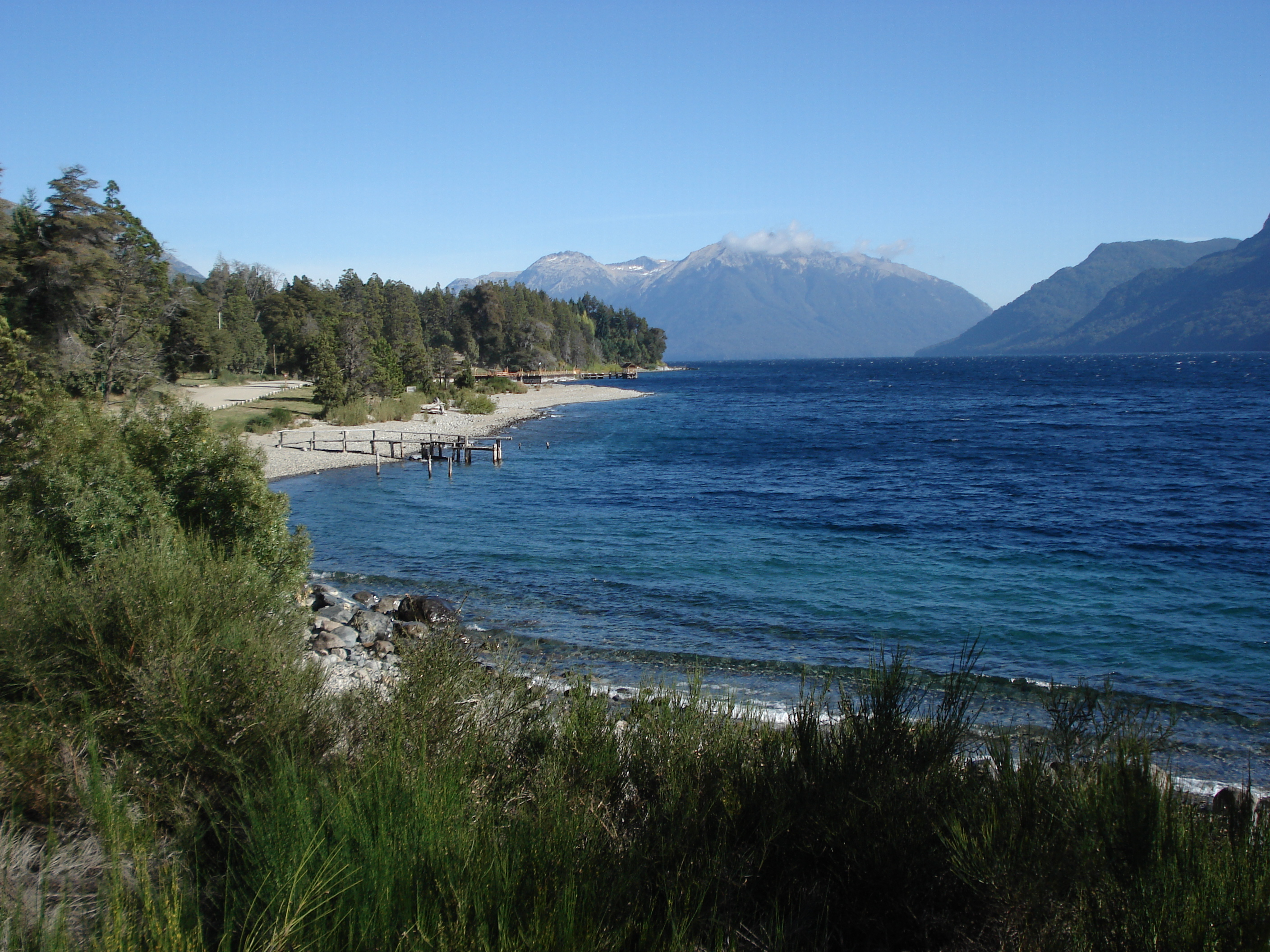
Lago Traful
