= Lake Frías =

- Lago Frías (Spanish)
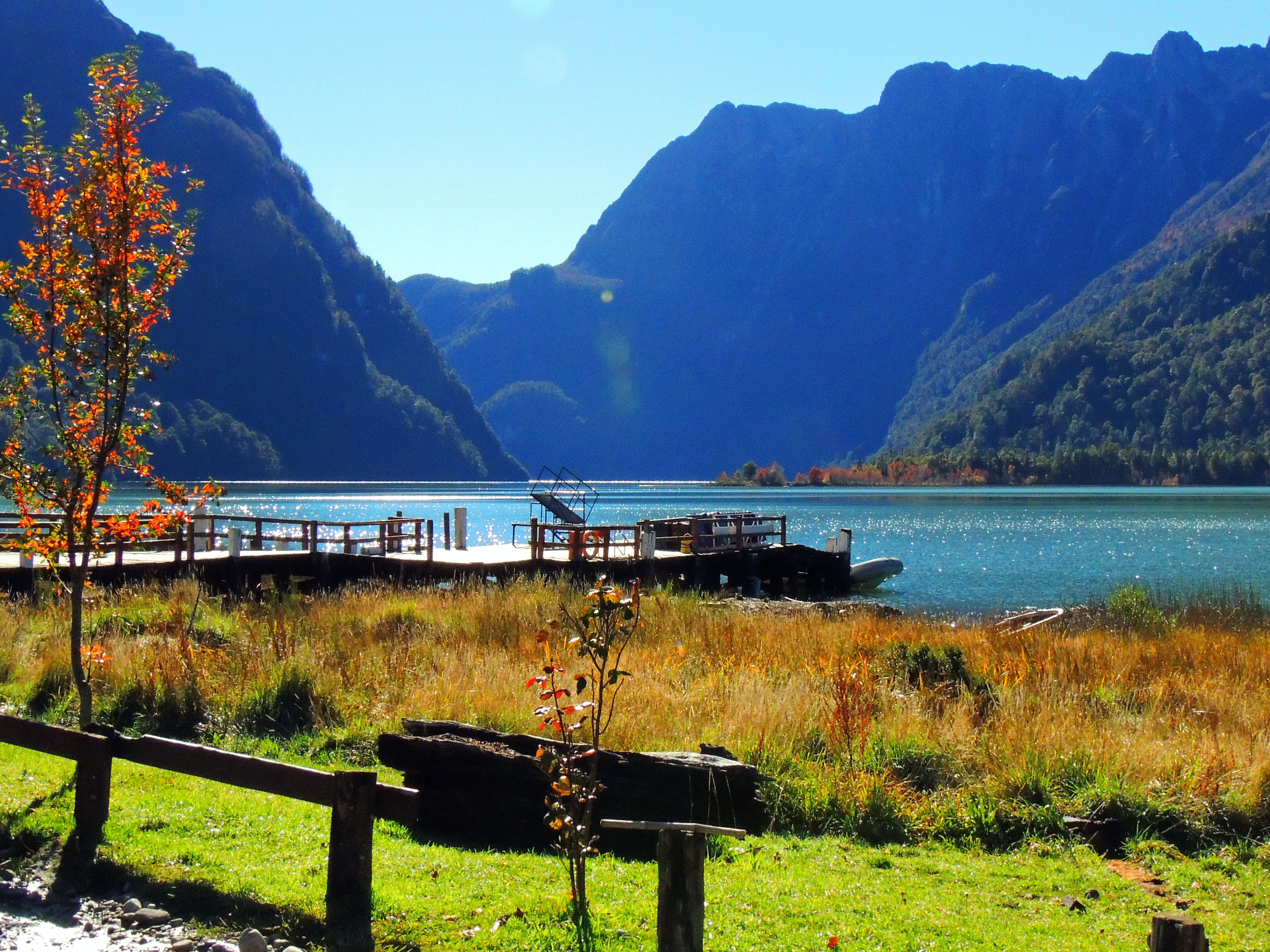
- Interactive map of Lake Frías
- Location: Bariloche Department, Río Negro Province (Argentina)
- Coordinates: 41°03′40″S 71°47′54″W
- Type: glacial lake
- Basin countries: Argentina
- Max. depth: ~75 m (246 ft)
- Surface elevation: 790 m (2,590 ft)

Lake Frías (Spanish: Lago Frías) is a glacial lake located in Nahuel Huapi National Park, in the province of Río Negro in Argentina.

== History ==
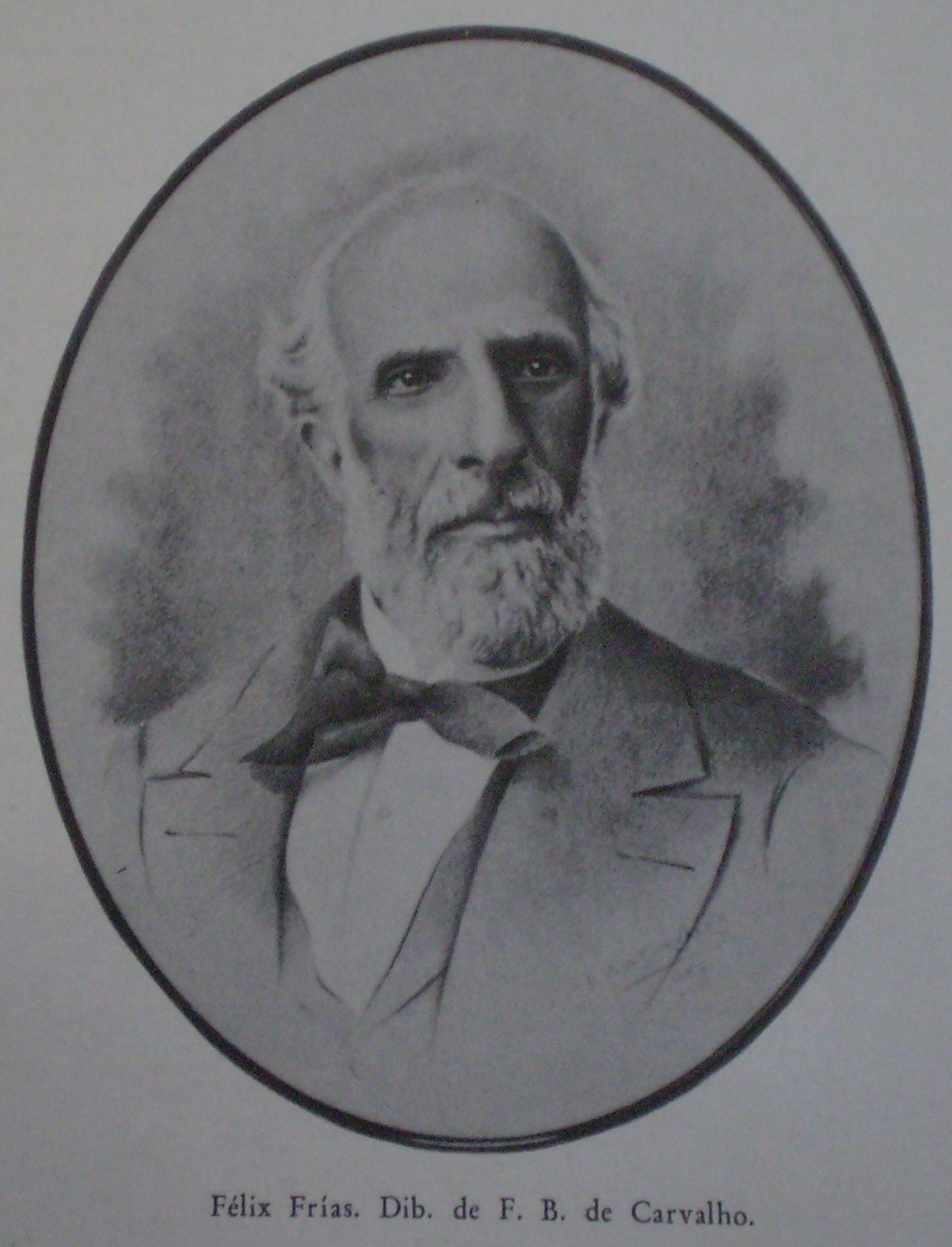
Félix Frías.

The lake was originally called "Lake Frio" by the expedition members Vicente Gómez and Federico Geisse. Later, Francisco P. Moreno adopted the name "Lake Frías" in honor of Félix Frías.

== Geography ==
Lake Frías, of glacial origin, is fed by the abundant rainfall of the area and by streams descending from the Cerro Tronador glaciers.

Climate data for Laguna Fría (1937–1966)
Month	Jan	Feb	Mar	Apr	May	Jun	Jul	Aug	Sep	Oct	Nov	Dec	Year
Average precipitation mm (inches)	159.2 (6.27)	149.3 (5.88)	214.6 (8.45)	277.0 (10.91)	502.2 (19.77)	502.0 (19.76)	447.4 (17.61)	346.3 (13.63)	277.9 (10.94)	187.3 (7.37)	234.6 (9.24)	181.6 (7.15)	3,480 (137.0)
Source: Secretaria de Mineria
