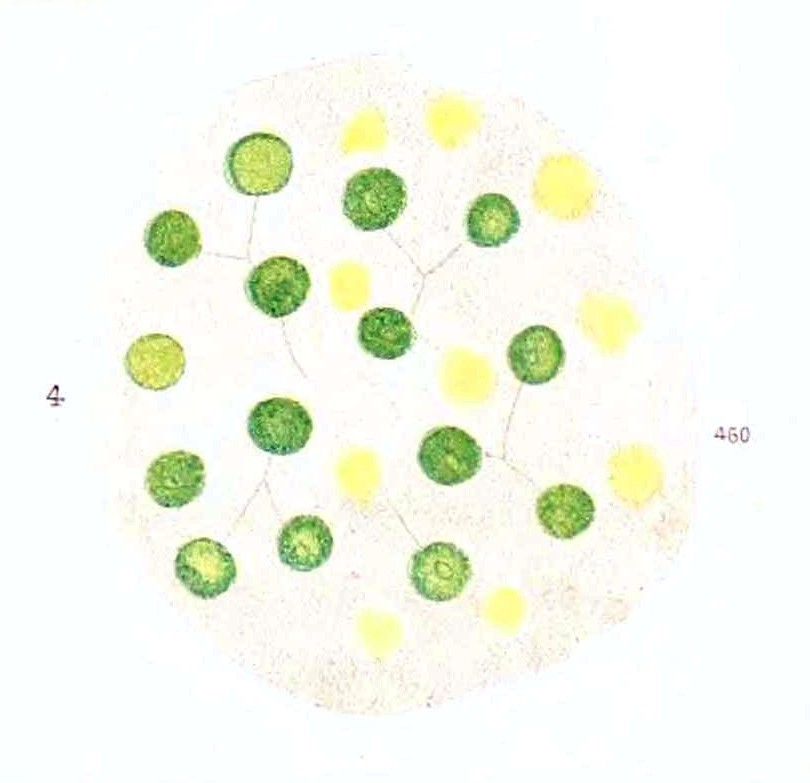

Scientific classification
- Clade: Viridiplantae
- Division: Chlorophyta
- Class: Trebouxiophyceae
- Order: Chlorellales
- Family: Chlorellaceae
- Genus: Mucidosphaerium
- Species: M. pulchellum

Binomial name
- Mucidosphaerium pulchellum (H.C.Wood) C.Bock, Proschold & Krienitz

Synonyms
- Dictyosphaerium pulchellum H.C.Wood

= Mucidosphaerium pulchellum =

Species of algae

Mucidosphaerium pulchellum, also known by its synonym Dictyosphaerium pulchellum, is a species of freshwater green algae, in the family Chlorellaceae.

Mucidosphaerium pulchellum is widespread, occurring in plankton of freshwater bodies. It appears to be the most common in temperate to subarctic climates. For example, it is present in many lakes in southern Chile and Argentina including Lanalhue, Quillén, Lácar, and Nahuel Huapi. In this last lake it is the dominant algae species in the winter halfyear. It has occasionally been found terrestrially on soil.

== Description ==
Mucidosphaerium pulchellum consists of colonies of cells up to 80 μm wide, with 16 to 32 (rarely 64) cells, or solitary cells. Young cells are obovoid to ellipsoidal or spindle-shaped, while older cells are spherical. The cells are attached on tetrachotomously branched (i.e. 4-branched) threads by their narrow ends. The chloroplast is basal and cup- or saucer-shaped, and contains a pyrenoid covered by two starch grains. Reproduction occurs by the formation of autospores (two to four per sporangium), which are released from a tear in the parental cell wall.

== Taxonomy ==
Traditionally, Mucidosphaerium pulchellum was distinguished from similar species (e.g. Dictyosphaerium ehrenbergianum, Dictyosphaerium tetrachotomum—now Hindakia tetrachotoma) by morphological features, such as the cell size and shape, and attachment of the cell to its stalk. However, molecular phylogenetic studies have found that algae matching the morphology of Dictyosphaerium sensu lato may be genetically distinct and belong to different species or genera, which are more or less cryptic in nature.
