= Gutiérrez Lake =

Lake in Río Negro, Argentina

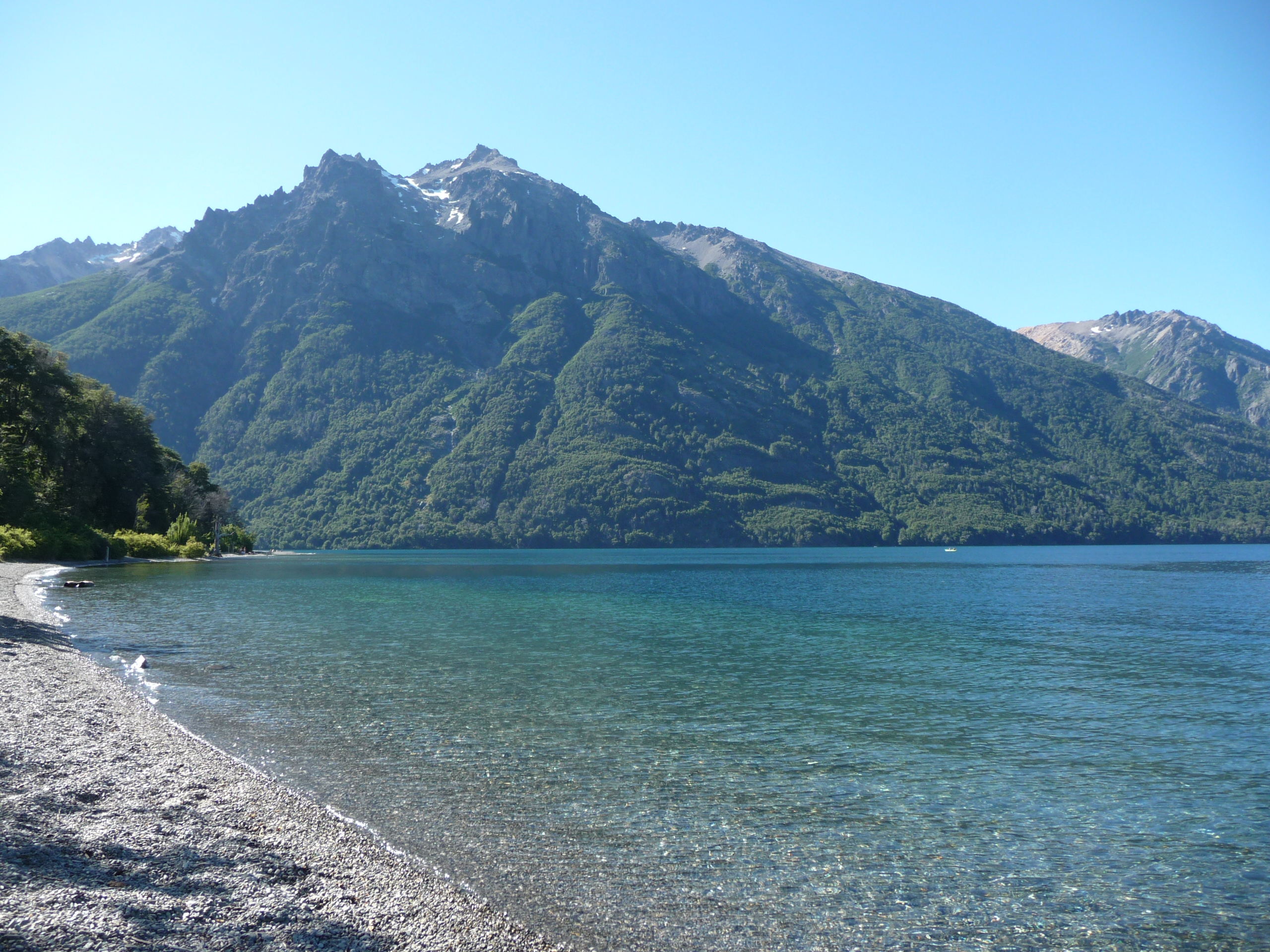

- Location within Argentina
- Location: Bariloche Department, Río Negro Province, Argentina, in Patagonia
- Coordinates: 41°11′12″S 71°24′37″W
- Type: Moraine-dammed lake
- Primary outflows: Gutiérrez River
- Basin countries: Argentina
- Surface elevation: 2,510 ft (770 m)
- Islands: 0 (no islands)
- Settlements: San Carlos de Bariloche

Gutiérrez Lake (Spanish: Lago Gutiérrez) is a lake of the lake region of northern Patagonia in the province of Río Negro, in Argentina. It is of glacial origin, being a Moraine-dammed lake. The lake is connected to Nahuel Huapi Lake. It was named by explorer and naturalist Francisco P. Moreno as an homage to his academic mentor Juan María Gutiérrez.

The lake harbors several species of trout including rainbow trout, brown trout and brook trout which attract anglers from the world over.

Despite being nowhere near any ocean and being at high altitude, the lake is also home to the kelp gull and the blue-eyed cormorant (Phalacrocorax atriceps), otherwise strictly marine birds.

The lake's clear waters are very susceptible to climate change and have an average surface temperature of 45 °F (7 °C). Hypothermia is one of the risks bathers must endure. Kayaking is a popular sport on this and adjacent lakes.

The lake is located near San Carlos de Bariloche (about 12 km), and it is a popular tourist attraction. It has several good spots for having a picnic or sunbathing.

== Villa los Coihues ==
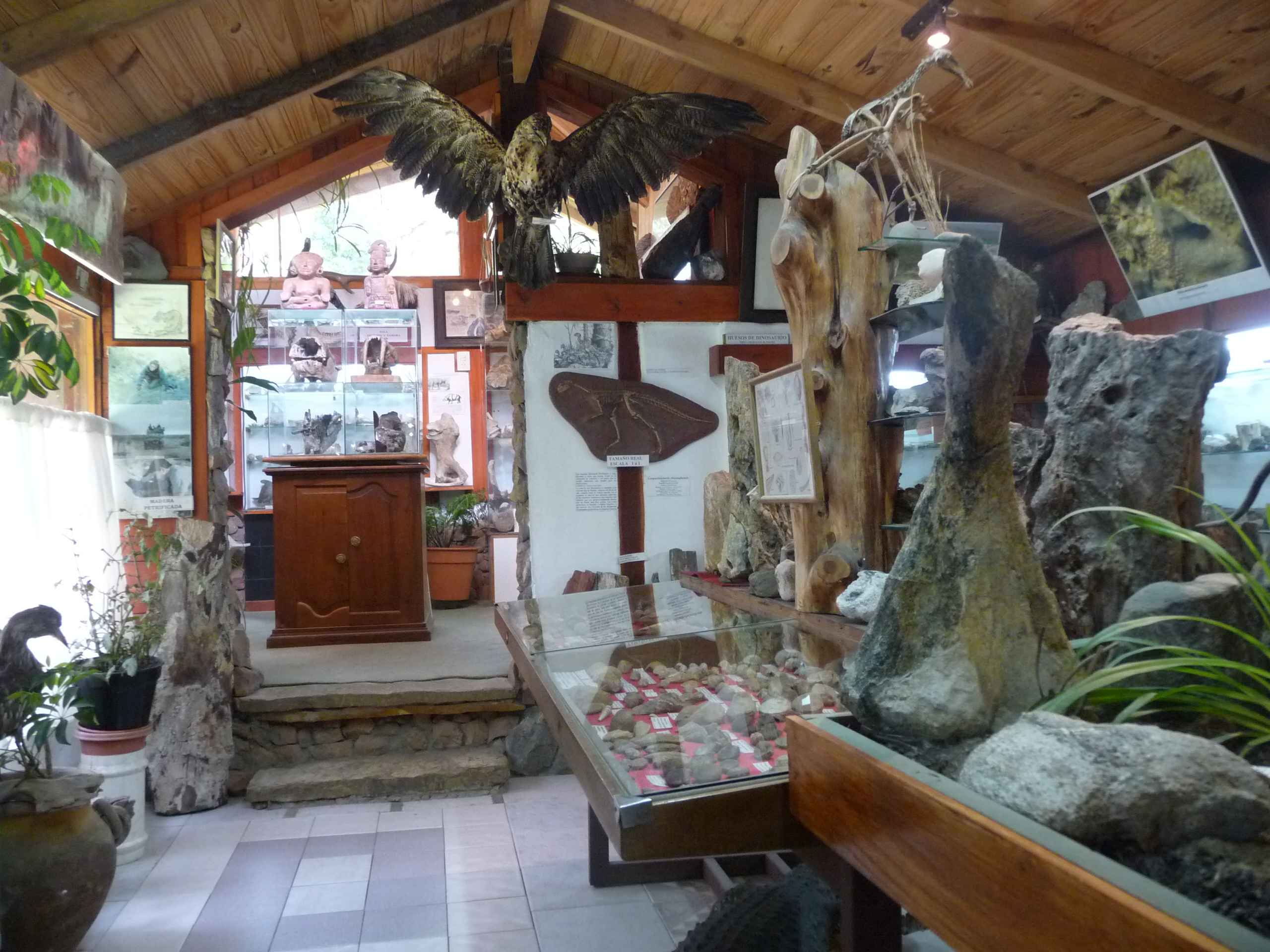
One room in the Dr Rosendo Pascual geological and paleontological museum

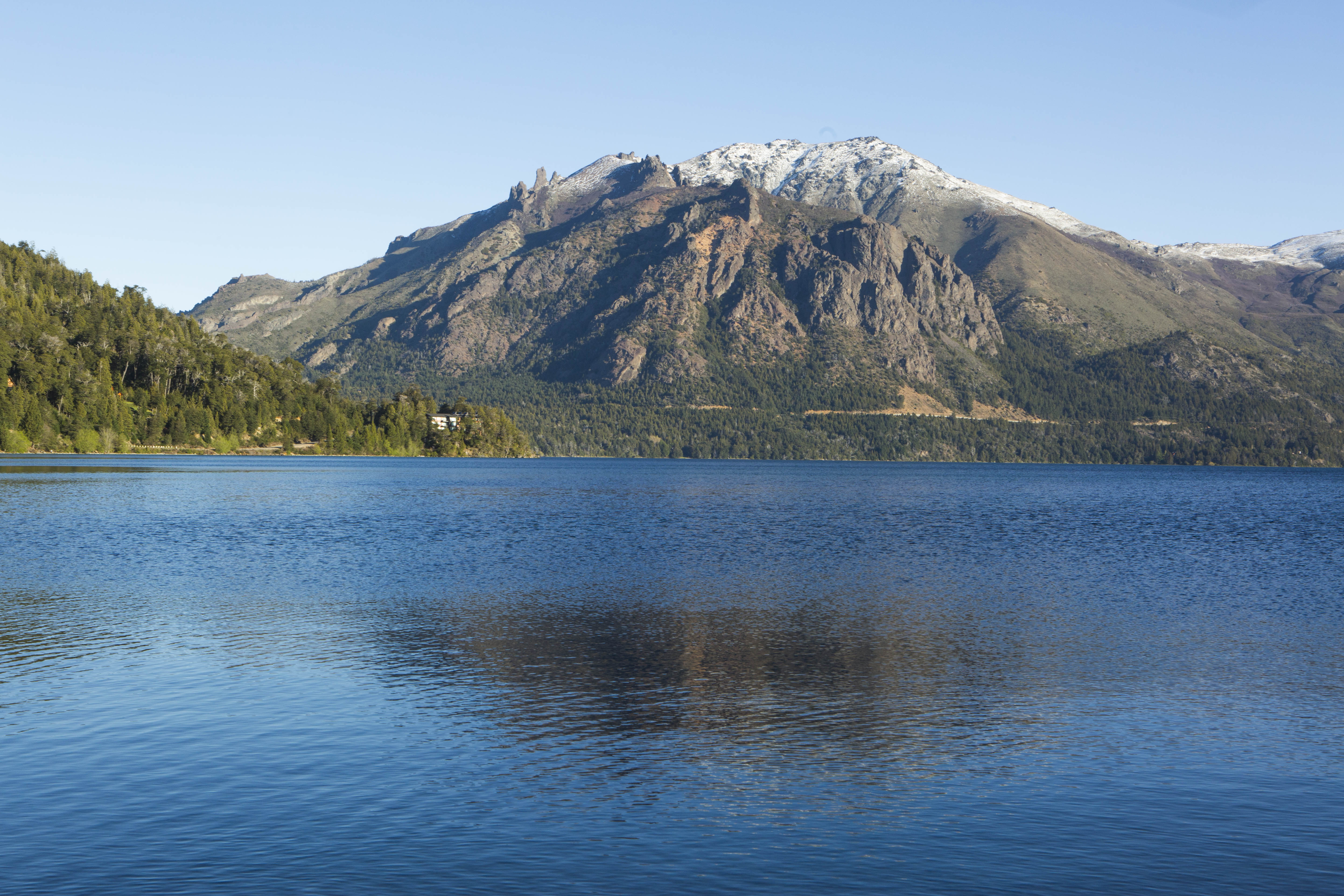
View from Villa los Coihues

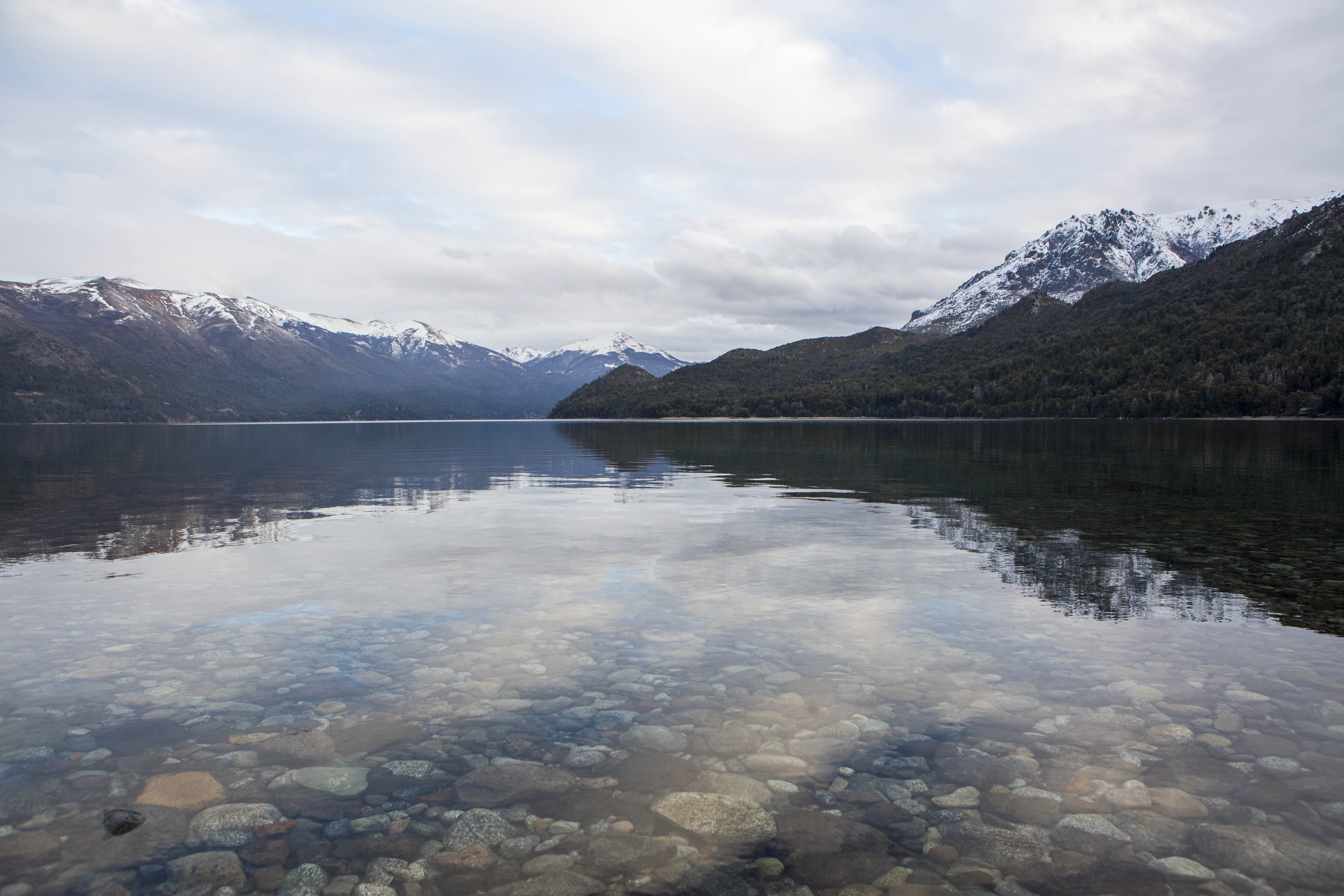
View from Arelauquen, before reaching the villa on the route

In the northern shore of the lake there is a village called Villa los Coihues (Coihue is the popular name of the tree Nothofagus dombeyi). It is a small but thriving community.

In this village is located the "Dr. Rosendo Pascual" geological and paleothological museum which, although small, exhibits a large collection of rocks and fossils.
