= Primo Capraro =

Italian businessman constructor (1873–1933)

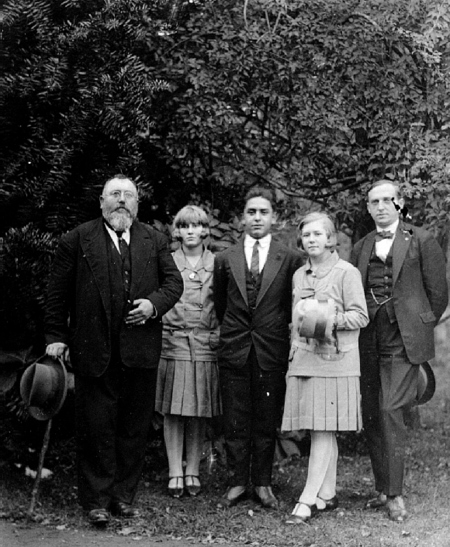
Primo Capraro in 1930, to the left, beside his children and a fellow.

Primo Modesto Capraro (Belluno, Italy, 1873 – San Carlos of Bariloche, Argentina, 1933) was an Italian businessman constructor based in southern Argentina. He was a pioneer in the trade, the industry and the tourism of the region of San Carlos of Bariloche.

== Biography ==
He studied in the industrial school of his home town and loaned military service like pontonier, carpentry, and construction. He promised marriage to his girlfriend Matilde for after a trip to Latin America. After failing on his attempt in Mexico, Santiago of Chile and Mendoza where he worked for a rail company, he traveled to the region of Bariloche to look for gold.

He arrived to the zone of Nahuel Huapi Lake in April 1903, and installed himself in the lake Correntoso. There he devoted himself to carpentry and to the construction, and was the constructor of the first houses of San Carlos of Bariloche. When he gathered sufficient revenue, he founded the Commercial Company and Grazier Chile Argentina and created a fleet of small boats to cross the lake.

Of impotent appearance, he was high and, blond, weighed almost 130 kg, and impressed to the scarce travellers that visited the isolated region by his initiative and his decision, since he did not use defend himself by force of the abuses of the English company that had the greater part of the earths of the zone.

Between his employees he had a Swiss youngster, Otto Meiling, that began the manufacture of skis and initiated the practice of this sport in Bariloche.

He was the founder of the Pension Mrs. Rosa, that over time would turn into the Hotel Correntoso, base for the tourist development of Villa La angostura, place that also owes his starts to Capraro. In the decade of 1920, almost all the economic and political activity of Bariloche went through Capraro, that was consul of Italy in the region, member of the Municipality, representative of several banks and insurance company, in addition to YPF.

The crisis of 1930 left it to the edge of the ruin, and the elections of this year deprived it of the absolute control of the local politics that had exerted until then. Even so, he had time to associate with other local employers to open the radiotelegraph office of Villa La Angostura on 15 May 1932, date in that it considers founded the current city.

He reportedly killed himself on 4 October 1932.

A square in Villa La Angostura, an avenue and a small monument in the city of Bariloche, and the most ancient private school of Bariloche honour with his name the memory of this pioneer.
