= Albert Capraro =

American fashion designer (1943–2013)

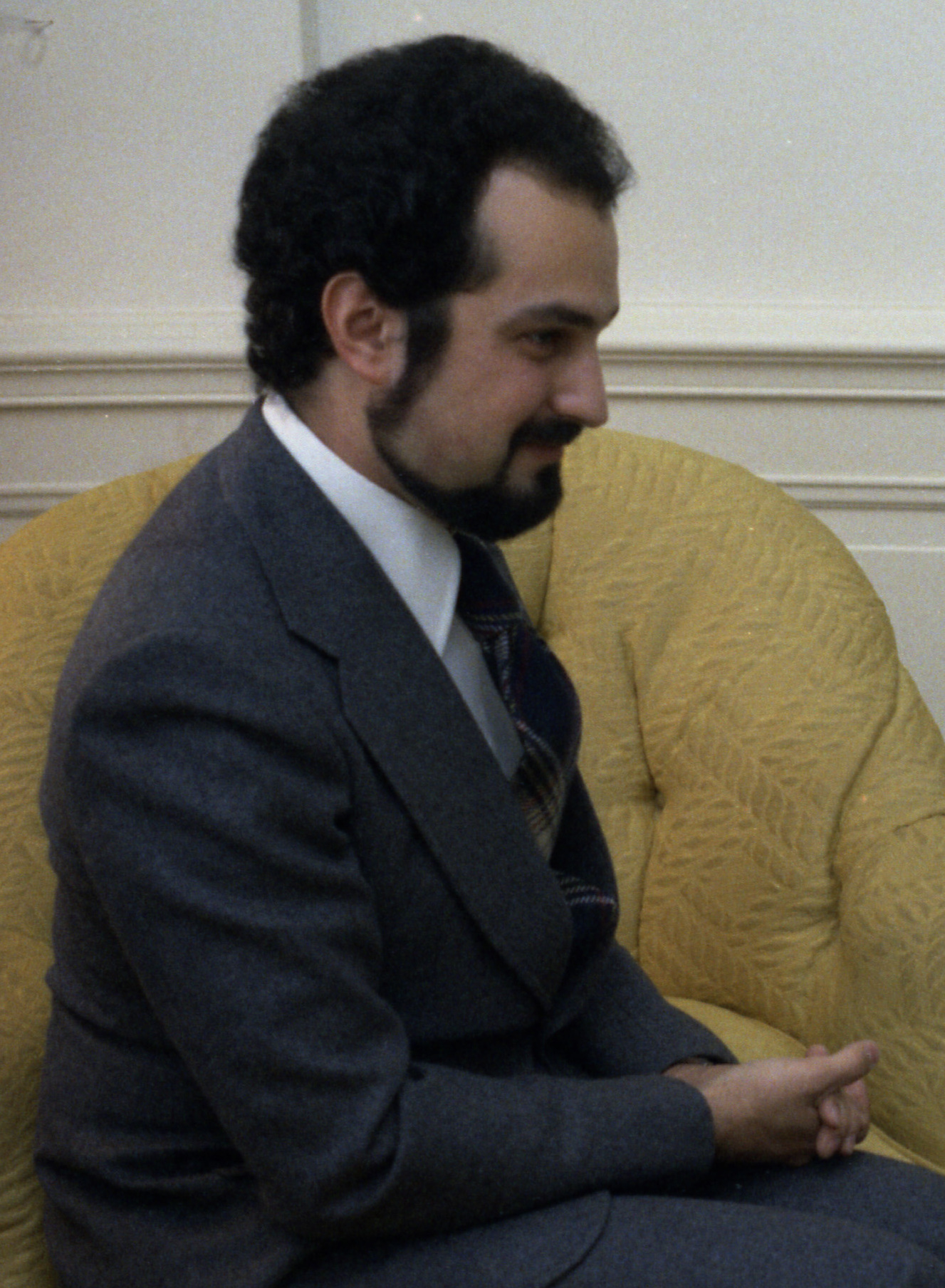
- Capraro in 1975
- Born: May 20, 1943; New York, New York
- Died: October 5, 2013 (aged 70); West Islip, New York
- Education: Parsons School of Design
- Label: ALBERT CAPRARO Ltd.- ALBERT CAPRARO COUTURE
- Website: albertcapraro.com

Albert Capraro (May 20, 1943 – October 5, 2013) was an American fashion designer.

== Early life and education ==
He graduated from Parsons School of Design and worked for Lilly Daché and Oscar de la Renta for 8 years crafting the boutique collection, before starting his own business in 1974. His clients included Betty Ford, Susan Ford, Barbara Walters, Cristina Ferrare, Polly Bergen, Tawny Little , Phyllis George and Anne Armstrong.

Capraro died in October 2013, aged 70.
