= Verschure & Co's =

Dutch shipbuilding company

Verschure & Co's Shipyard and Machinefactory
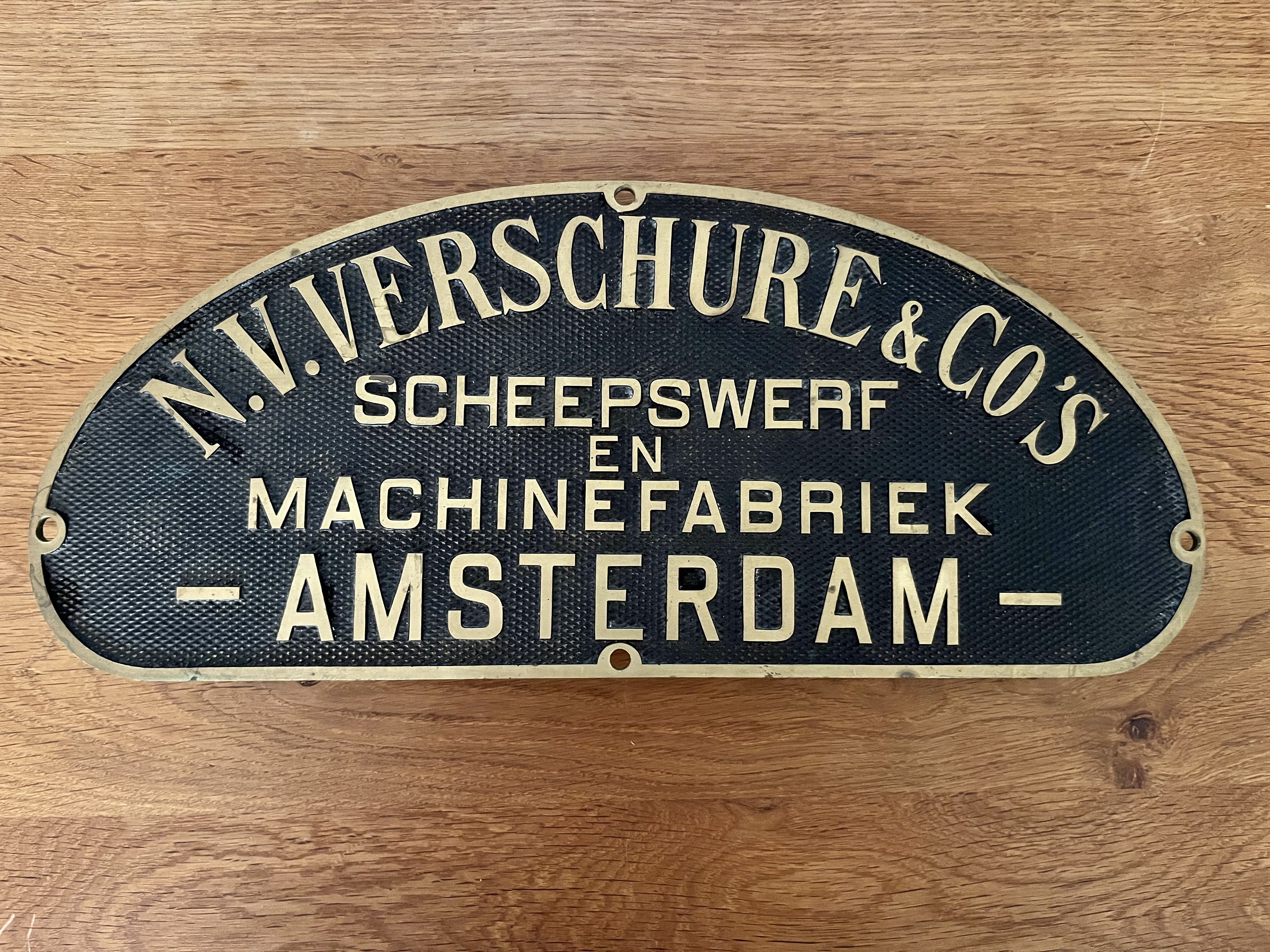
- Manufacturer's plate used in engine room floating grain elevator IGMA
- Industry: shipbuilding
- Founded: 1908
- Defunct: 1980
- Headquarters: Amsterdam

Verschure & Co's was a shipbuilding company and machine factory in Amsterdam.

== Context ==
The shipping line Verschure & Co created its own repair shop in the Oosterdok, Amsterdam in the early 20th century. This was a floating repair shop, the changed paddle steamer Stad Zwolle. In 1908 it became a real shipyard on a terrain on the north shore of the IJ. This was at Meeuwenlaan, and the later Motor Canal. The terrain was leased from the municipality of Amsterdam.

Verschure thus became a complete shipyard, but it was still primarily meant for repairing the shipping line's ships. It immediately got electricity for lighting and machinery, instead of using steam. The shipyard was also successful in doing work for others. In 1912 it built its first ships for the shipping line. In 1913 Verschure & Co. became a separate private limited company, the N.V. Verschure & Co's Scheepswerf en Machinefabriek. The capital stock was 300.000 guilders, of which 150.000 actually bought. Ing. A.J.M. (Ton) Verschure became its first chief executive.

In 1915/1916 Verschure & Co's got a new shipyard on the Johan van Hasselt Canal with two slipways. In 1918 this was extended with a new boiler factory and smithy. The facility was completed in 1919, when it got its own floating dry dock. This dry dock was bought in Germany, where it had been used for submarines.

== Interwar period ==
After World War I international shipbuilding had a few years of very high demand. In 1920 Verschure and Co's had 900 employees. From 1922 to 1924 Verschure lost money, and the number of employees dropped to 300. A turning point was the 1923 order for two tin dredgers, which would become a specialization. The other specialization of Verschure were floating grain elevators.

The 1930s were very bad, with staff dropping to only 240 employees in 1934. From then business improved for Verschure with orders for dredging equipment for the Zuiderzee Works.

== IHC ==
=== Industriële Handels Combinatie IHC ===
In 1943 the partnership Industriële Handels Combinatie IHC was founded by six companies specialized in dredging equipment. In October 1944 the shipyard and factory with its dry dock, floating sheerleg and crane were almost completely destroyed by the occupation forces. Recovery was quick, and in November 1946 the first post-war tin dredger was launched.

Like many other Dutch shipyards, Verschure profited from the post-war boom in shipbuilding. Because of space limitations a new machine factory DMN was founded in Noordwijkerhout in 1951. In 1952 Verschure acquired part of the recently founded Oranjewerf, and became its manager. In 1954 Verschure had 1,100 employees. In 1958 it got its second dry dock. In 1959 Verschure got total ownership of the Oranjewerf.

=== IHC Holland ===
In 1965, Verschure and four other partners of IHC founded the holding IHC Holland. In 1971 the companies themselves were merged into IHC Holland NV. This new company had to deal with the European shipbuilding crisis that started in the 1970s. In 1978 Gusto Shipyard in Schiedam was closed down. At that time, the Amsterdam activities of IHC consisted of three parts. The machine factory and head office were on the Meeuwenlaan. New ships were built at Verschure shipyard at Zamenhofstraat. Ship repair was done at the Oranjewerf. In 1979 Verschure & Co's shipyard was closed down.

In 1989 the inventory of the machine factory and the dry dock were moved to the Oranjewerf. The terrain and buildings were sold to the municipality.
