= Nahuel Huapi Lake =

Lake in Patagonia

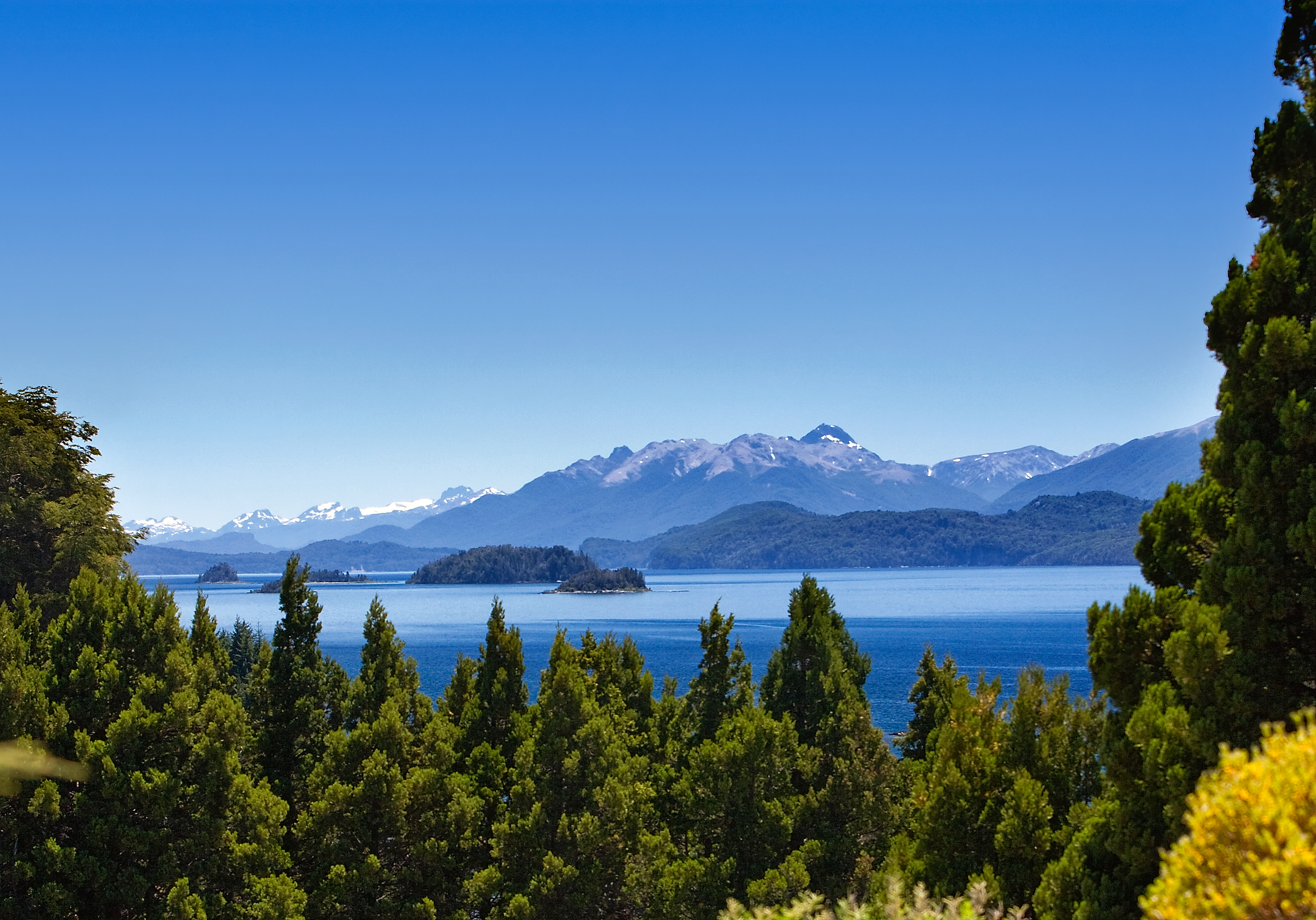

- Location within Argentina
- Location: Los Lagos Department, Neuquén Province / Bariloche Department, Río Negro Province, Argentina, in Patagonia
- Coordinates: 41°05′25″S 71°20′08″W
- Type: Glacial lake
- Primary inflows: Huemul river Correntoso river Bonito river Machete river
- Primary outflows: Limay River
- Catchment area: 3,989 km^{2} (1,540 sq mi)
- Basin countries: Argentina
- Max. length: 76 km (47 mi)
- Max. width: 10.1 km (6.3 mi)
- Surface area: 530 km^{2} (205 sq mi)
- Average depth: 157 m (515 ft)
- Max. depth: 464 m (1,522 ft) deeper places might exist
- Water volume: 83.35 km^{3} (20.00 cu mi)
- Shore length^{1}: 357 km (222 mi)
- Surface elevation: 2,523 ft (769 m)
- Frozen: never
- Islands: Isla Victoria; Isla Huemul
- Settlements: San Carlos de Bariloche; Villa La Angostura
- ^{1} Shore length is not a well-defined measure.

Nahuel Huapi Lake (Spanish: Lago Nahuel Huapi) is an Andean lake in the lake region of northern Patagonia between the provinces of Río Negro and Neuquén, in Argentina. The lake has a northwest-southeast elongated shape and complex geography with several branches, peninsulas and islands. The city of Bariloche is on the southern shore of the lake and the town of Villa La Angostura lies on its northwestern shores. The lake is wholly inside Nahuel Huapi National Park. It is one of the largest lakes in northern Patagonia. It is drained by Limay River and it is part of the watershed of Negro River which discharges into the South Atlantic. The lake is, Argentinas deepest non-cryptodepression (the deepest point is well over mean sea level).

== Etymology ==
The name of the lake derives from the toponym of its major island in Mapudungun (Mapuche language): "Island of Puma", from nahuel, 'puma', and huapí, 'island'. There is, however, more to the word "Nahuel"—it can also signify 'a man who by sorcery has been transformed to a puma'.

== Geography ==
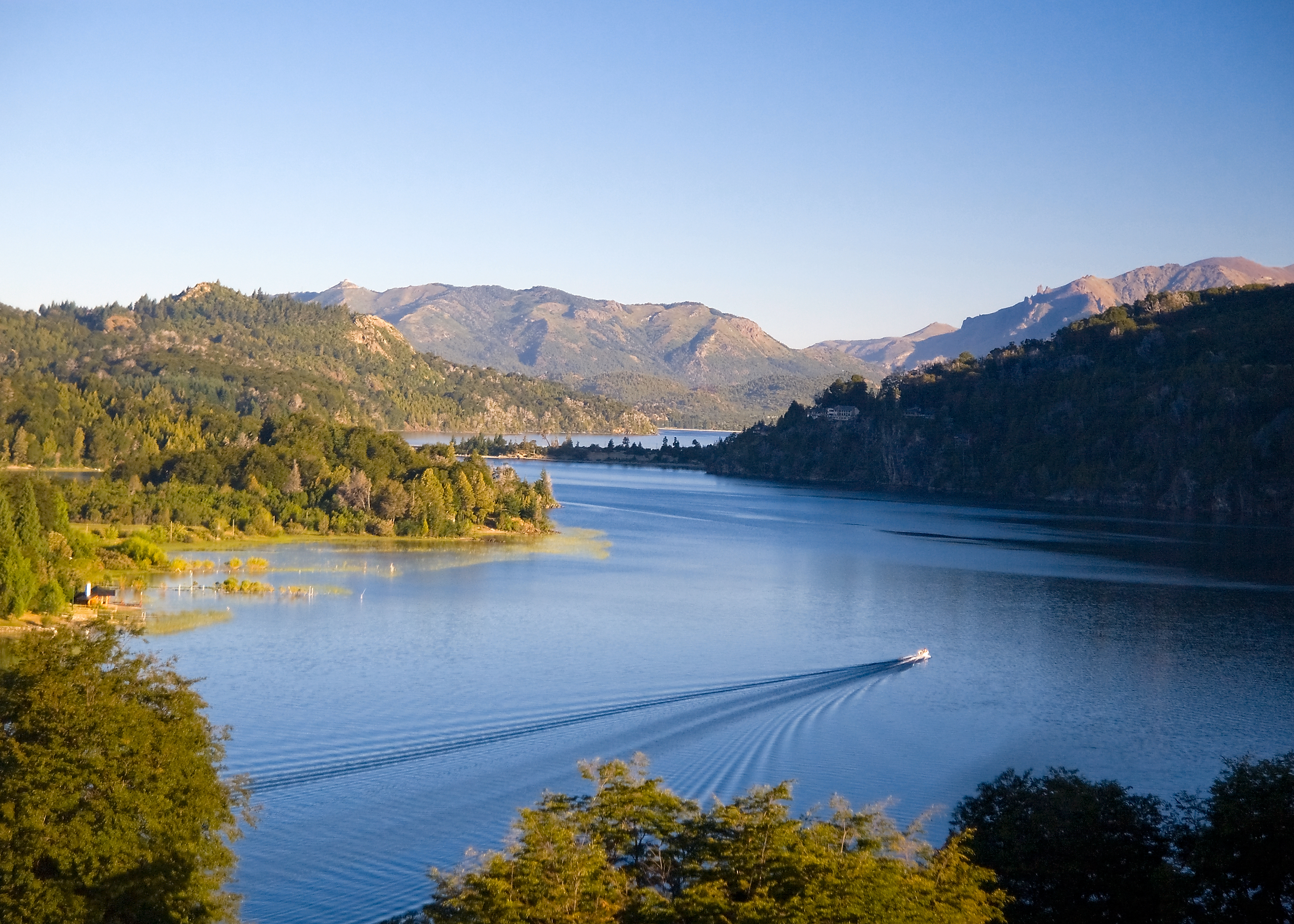
Lake Nahuel Huapi. The surrounding area became Argentina's first National Park in 1903

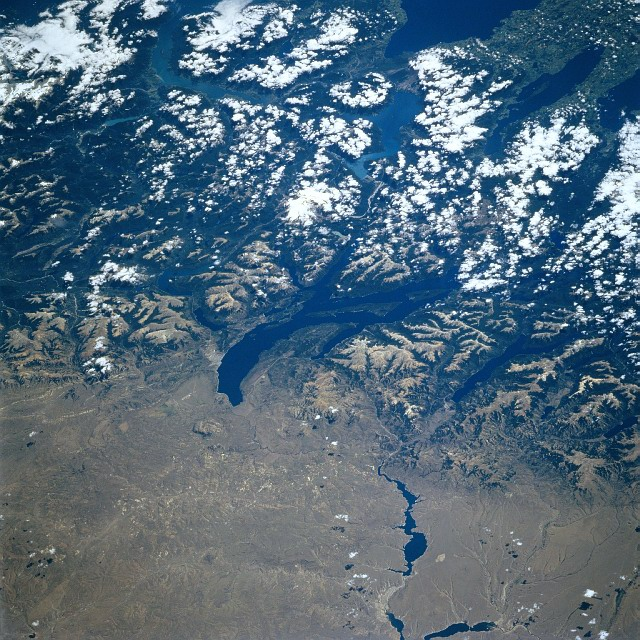
Lake Nahuel Huapi from space (the elongated, dark feature in the center of the image is the lake and in the bottom is seen the Limay River), North is to the right of the image, 1997.

Nahuel Huapi lake, located within the Nahuel Huapi National Park, has a surface of 530 km^{2} (200 sq mi), rests 770 metres (2,510 ft) above the sea level, and has a maximum measured depth (as of 2007) of 464 metres (1,522 ft).

Its seven branches are named Blest (36 km^{2} or 14 sq mi), Huemul (21.5 km^{2} or 8.3 sq mi), de la Tristeza (18.5 km^{2} or 7.1 sq mi), Campanario (7.9 km^{2} or 3.1 sq mi), Machete, del Rincón and Última Esperanza. It is connected to other smaller lakes such as Gutiérrez, Moreno, Espejo and Correntoso. The deep-blue waters hold a number of islands, most notably Isla Victoria with an area of 31 km^{2} (12 sq mi), and Isla Huemul on the south end of the lake.

The lake's crystal clear waters are very susceptible to climate changes and have an average surface temperature of 7 °C (45 °F); this makes it both beautiful and treacherous. Hypothermia is one of the risks bathers must undertake. Kayaking is a popular sport on this and adjacent lakes. The lake is also the starting point of the Limay River.

== Limnology and geology ==
The lake depression consists of several glacial valleys carved out along faults and Miocene valleys that were later dammed by moraines. During the Last Glacial Maximum of the Llanquihue glaciation the lake basin was wholly occupied by a glacier.

The lake has usually a blue colour but on occasion its water have turned turquoise or green after earthquakes in southern Chile such as the one on 22 May 1960 and the one on 2 January 2011.

The June 2011 eruption of the Puyehue-Cordón Caulle volcanic complex, in neighboring Chile, caused parts of the lake's surface to be blanketed in volcanic ash.

The dominant species of plankton in the winter half-year in the lake is Dictyosphaerium pulchellum. The remainder of the year Bacillariophyceae and Chrysophyceae algae dominate.

== Fauna ==
This lake harbors several introduced, non-native species of trout, including rainbow trout, brown trout and brook trout which attract anglers from the world over.

A curious fact about the lake is that, despite being nowhere near any ocean and being at high altitude, it is also home for kelp gull and the blue eyed cormorant (Phalacrocorax atriceps), otherwise strictly marine birds.

== Culture ==
=== Nahuelito ===
At the beginning of the 20th century, and following an old aboriginal legend, the rumor of a giant creature living in the deep waters of the lake took up. The creature is known locally as Nahuelito. Reported sightings of it predate Nessie and Arthur Conan Doyle's The Lost World (1912).

Local Mapuche called another creature el Cuero (leather) for its smooth skin. The neighboring lake Lago Lácar, has also been the site for accounts of another creature, more consistent with a plesiosaur, with aborigines describing it as a sea-cow with teeth all around it.

Members of the Buenos Aires Zoo visited the lake in 1922 trying to corroborate the reports of sightings of the prehistoric animal, but found no evidence to support the theory of such a creature.

=== Hitler conspiracy theory ===
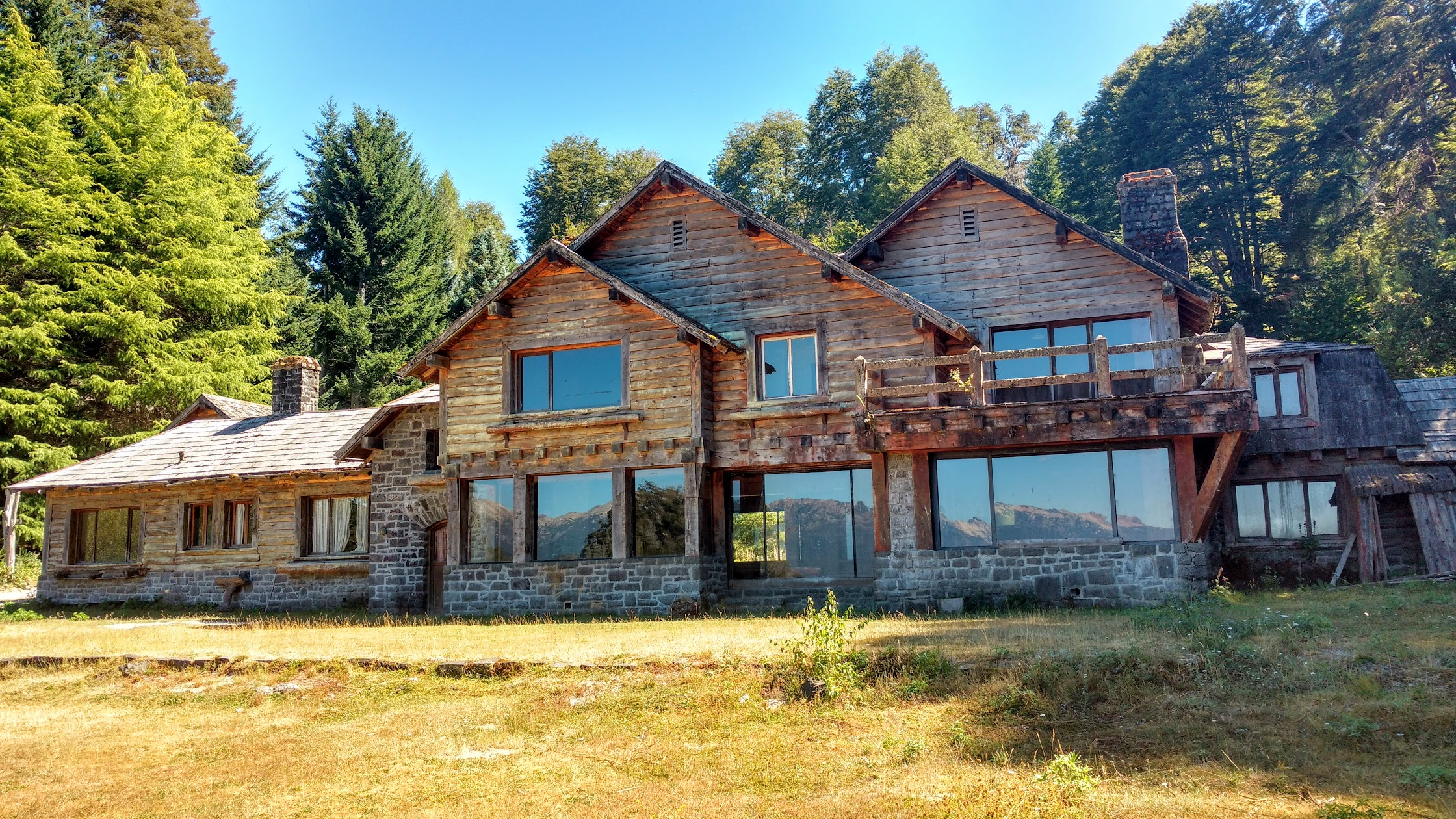
The Inalco House near the current settlement of Villa La Angostura. According to the fringe theory, Hitler lived some years here after 1945.

Some works, such as the National Police Gazette (circa 1950–1970), an American tabloid-style magazine, as well as a 2004 book by Abel Basti and the 2011 book Grey Wolf claim that Adolf Hitler and Eva Braun did not commit suicide but escaped to Argentina along with other Nazis and lived in the surroundings of Bariloche for many years after World War II. Hitler and Braun allegedly resided at the Inalco House, located at the northwest end of the lake, in part due to the estate's remoteness and lack of accessibility.

The son of real-estate businessman Primo Capraro sold the property to architect Alejandro Bustillo, who designed the house in early 1943. The plan includes unusual design features such as bedrooms connected by bathrooms (and closets), similar to Hitler's Berghof residence in Bavaria. Bustillo sold the estate to Enrique García Merou, a Buenos Aires lawyer linked to several German businesses; Merou is alleged to have assisted the Nazi ratlines. The residence was later sold to businessman Jorge Antonio, the representative of German automaker Mercedes-Benz in Argentina and a close associate of Argentine president Juan Perón. In 1970, the house was sold to José Rafael Trozzo, who also bought properties owned by escaped Schutzstaffel (SS) officer Reinhard Kopps, who—along with Capraro—had ties to SS commander Erich Priebke. The Trozzo family put the house up for sale in 2011.

According to the fringe theory, a number of U-boats ferried certain high level Nazis including Adolf Hitler and Eva Braun and a large amount of Nazi loot to Argentina, where the Nazis were given refuge by Perón, who, with his wife Evita, had been receiving money from the Nazis for some time. Hitler allegedly went to Argentina, first staying at Hacienda San Ramón, a large ranch east of San Carlos de Bariloche. Hitler then moved to a Bavarian-style mansion at Inalco where he remained until Peron was overthrown in a military coup in 1955, when he fled to an even more remote chalet to avoid detection when the new government in Buenos Aires began looking for Nazi war criminals alleged to be hiding in Argentina. Purportedly, Eva Braun left Hitler around 1954 and moved to Neuquén with their daughter, Ursula ('Uschi'), and Hitler died in February 1962.

Citing a former Nazi presence in Bariloche, the investigative series Hunting Hitler (2015–2018) reveals a guard tower—reportedly built by the same architect as the Inalco House—looking over the lake (situated closer to Bariloche than the house), as well as a destroyed bunker on the other side of the lake; together the two sites (in addition to other possible lookouts such as a wooden building resembling a guard shack) may have provided a panoramic view used to safeguard the mansion, then accessible from only the lake due to heavy forestation and long rumoured to have housed Hitler. Additionally, the Hunting Hitler team cited the proximity of German scientist Ronald Richter's Perón-backed nuclear fusion project on Huemul Island.

In a 2018 episode of Expedition Unknown, Abel Basti secured a rare excursion into the Inalco House, revealing little except for some old kitchen utensils in the basement. Using a metal detector on the grounds, host Josh Gates located a Nazi coin, leading him to conclude that Nazis (but not necessarily Hitler) could have used the house.

== Gallery ==
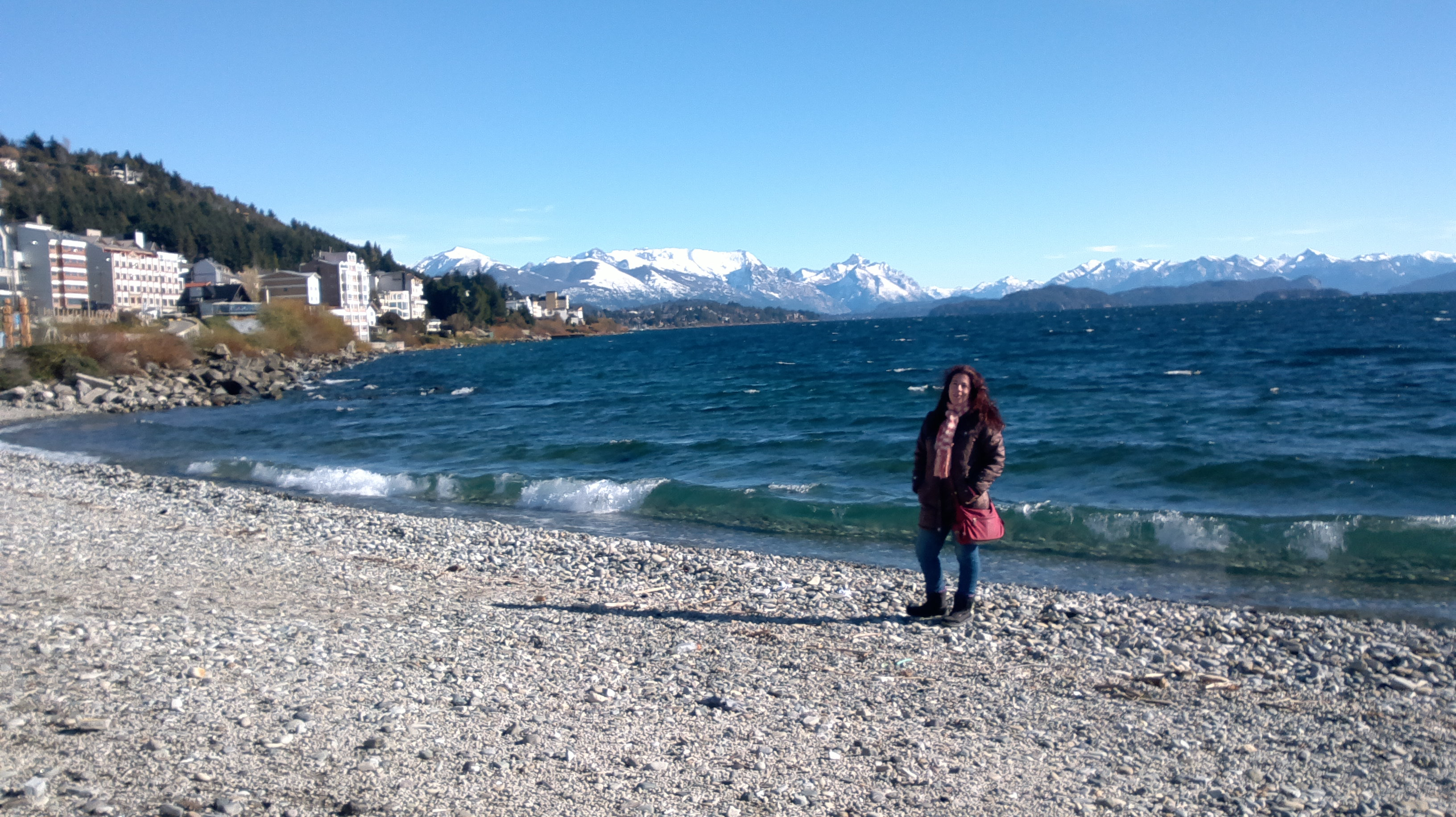
Nahuel Huapi Lake

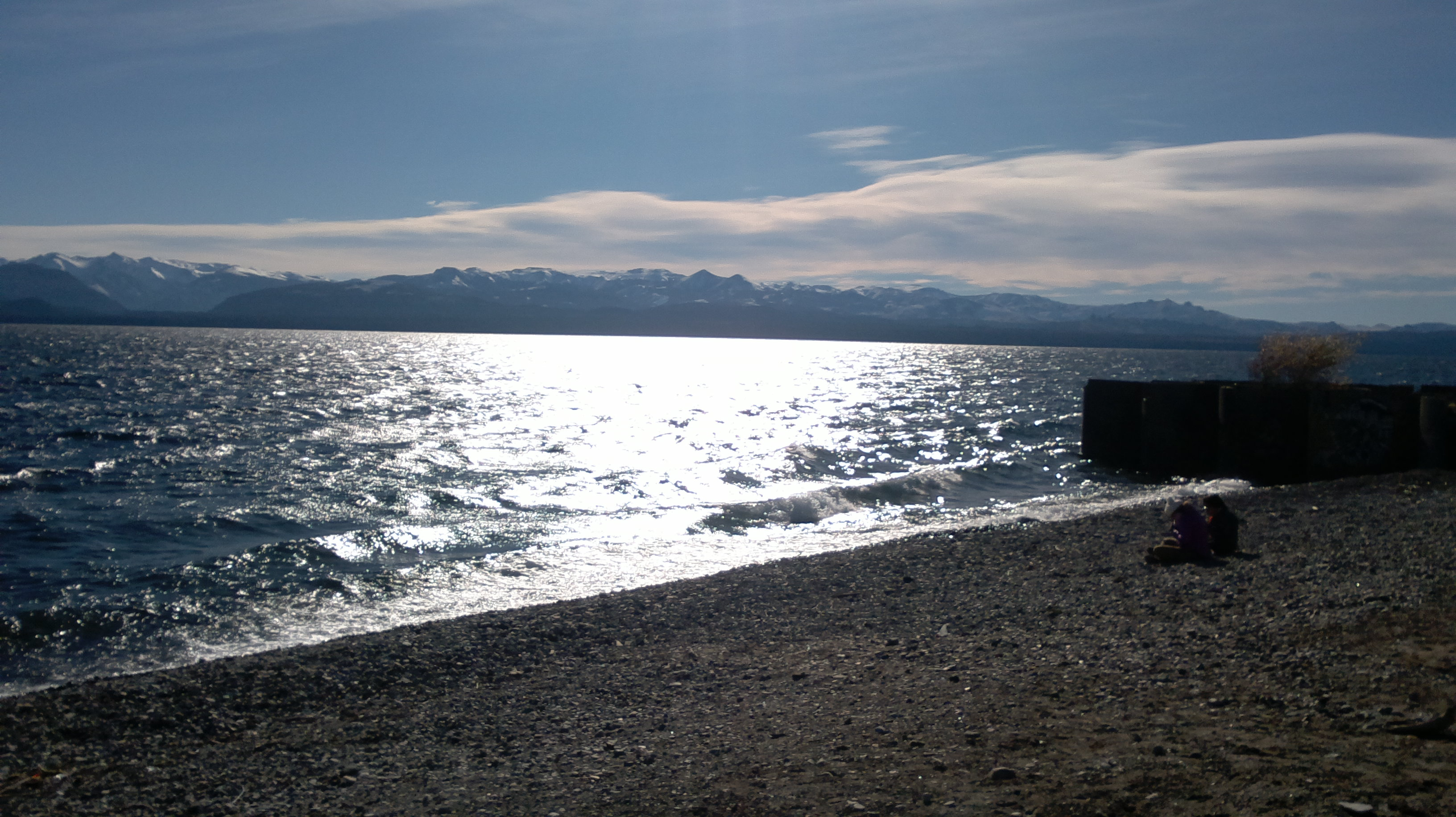
Sun over the Nahuel Huapi lake at 12:00 pm

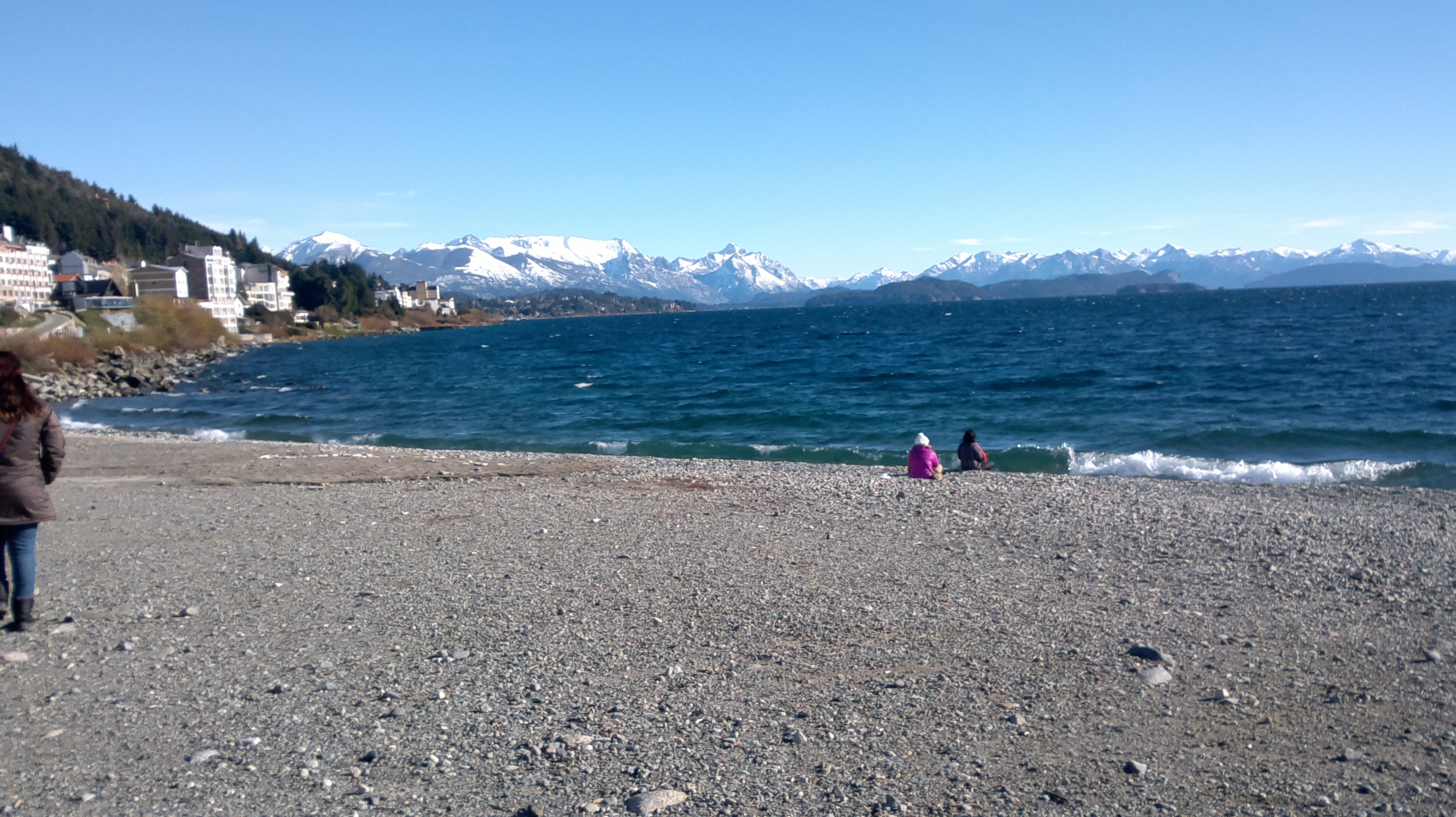
Windy Nahuel Huapi

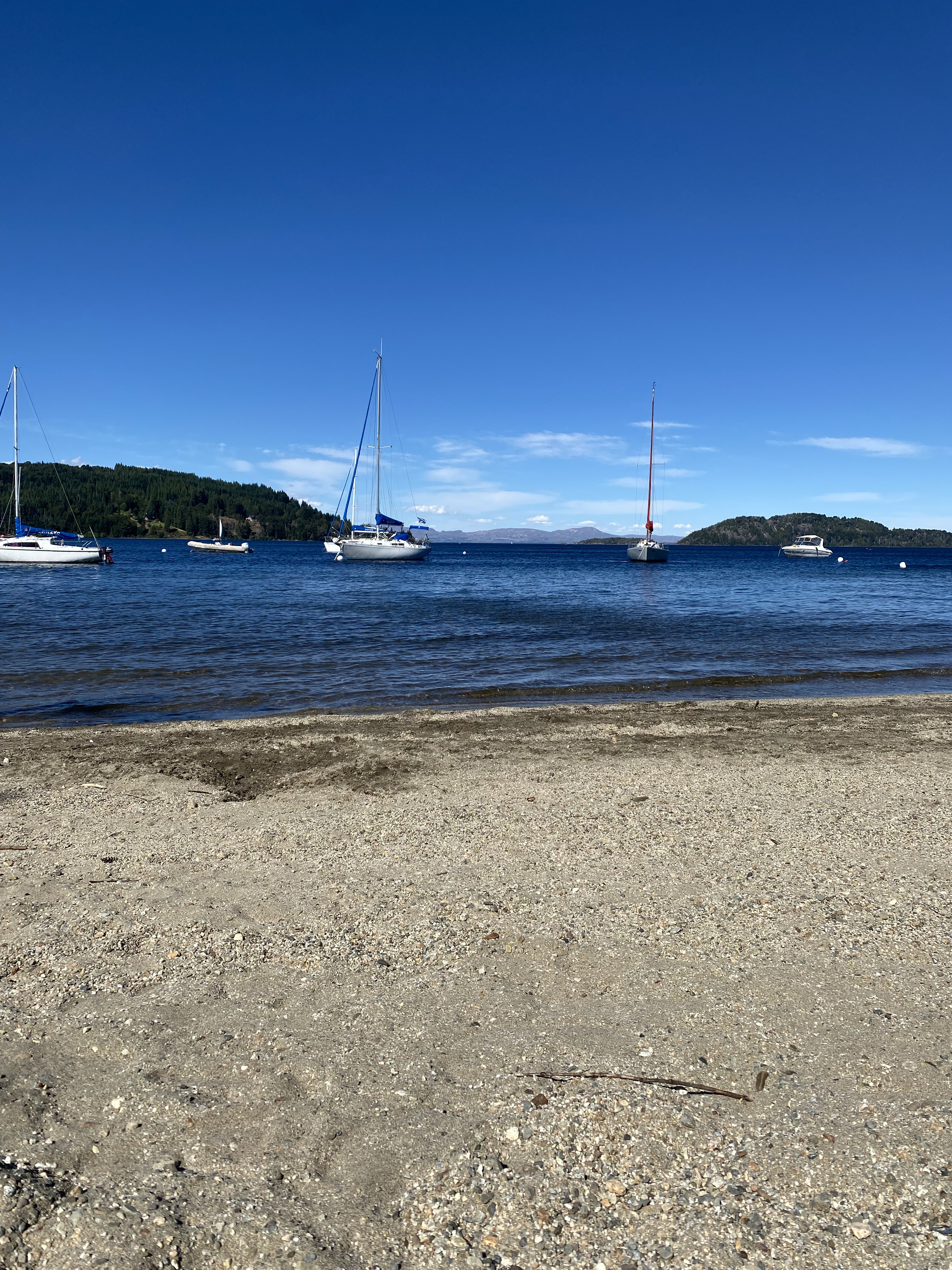
Nahuel Huapi Lake captured from Camping Petunia

== See also ==
- Limay River, a major river of the region that runs from the lake
