= Espejo Lake =

Glacial lake in Argentina

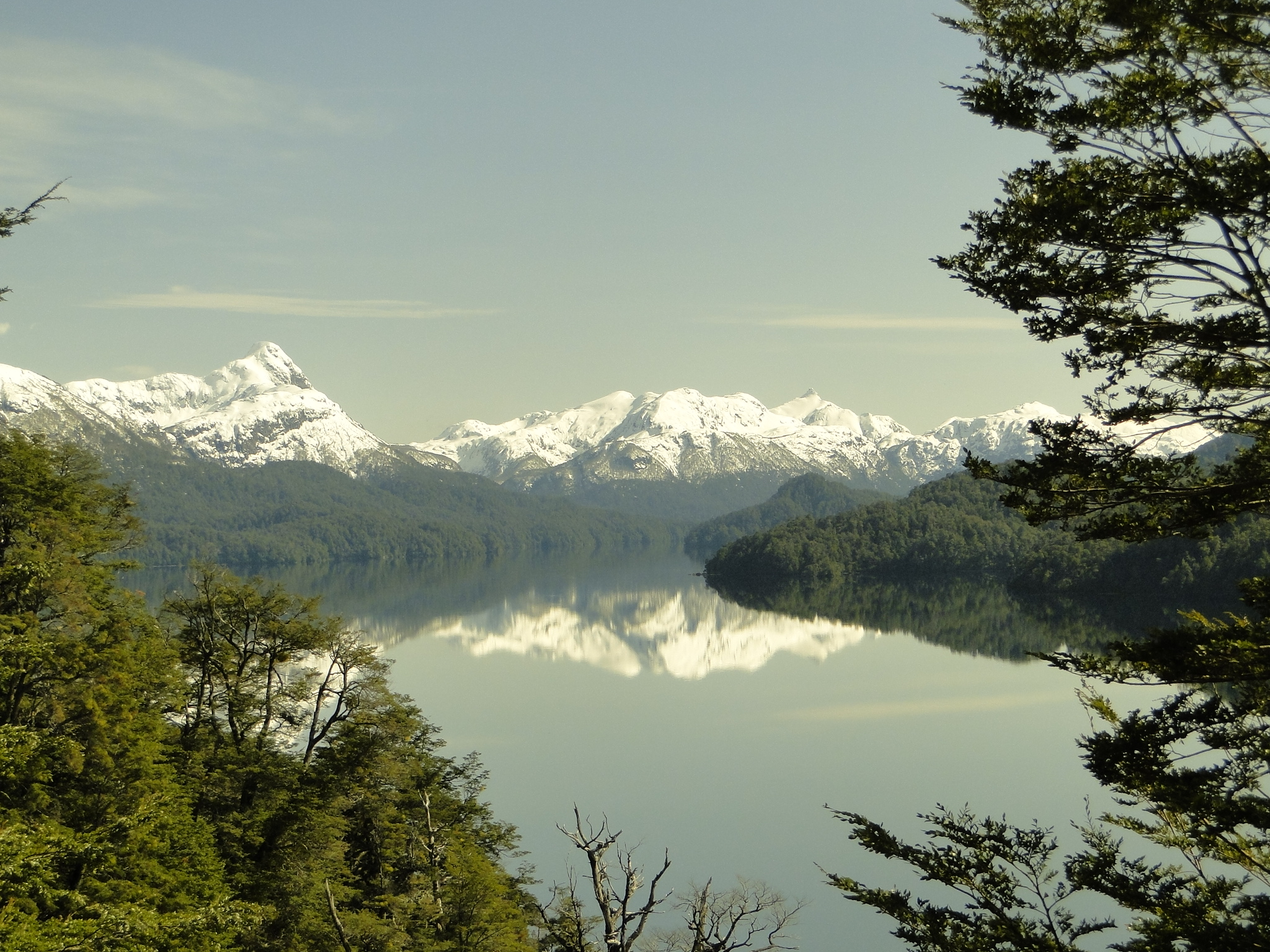

- Location within Argentina
- Location: Los Lagos Department, Neuquén Province
- Coordinates: 40°37′S 71°45′W
- Type: glacial
- Basin countries: Argentina
- Surface area: 30 km^{2} (12 sq mi)
- Max. depth: 245 m (804 ft)
- Surface elevation: 786 m (2,579 ft)

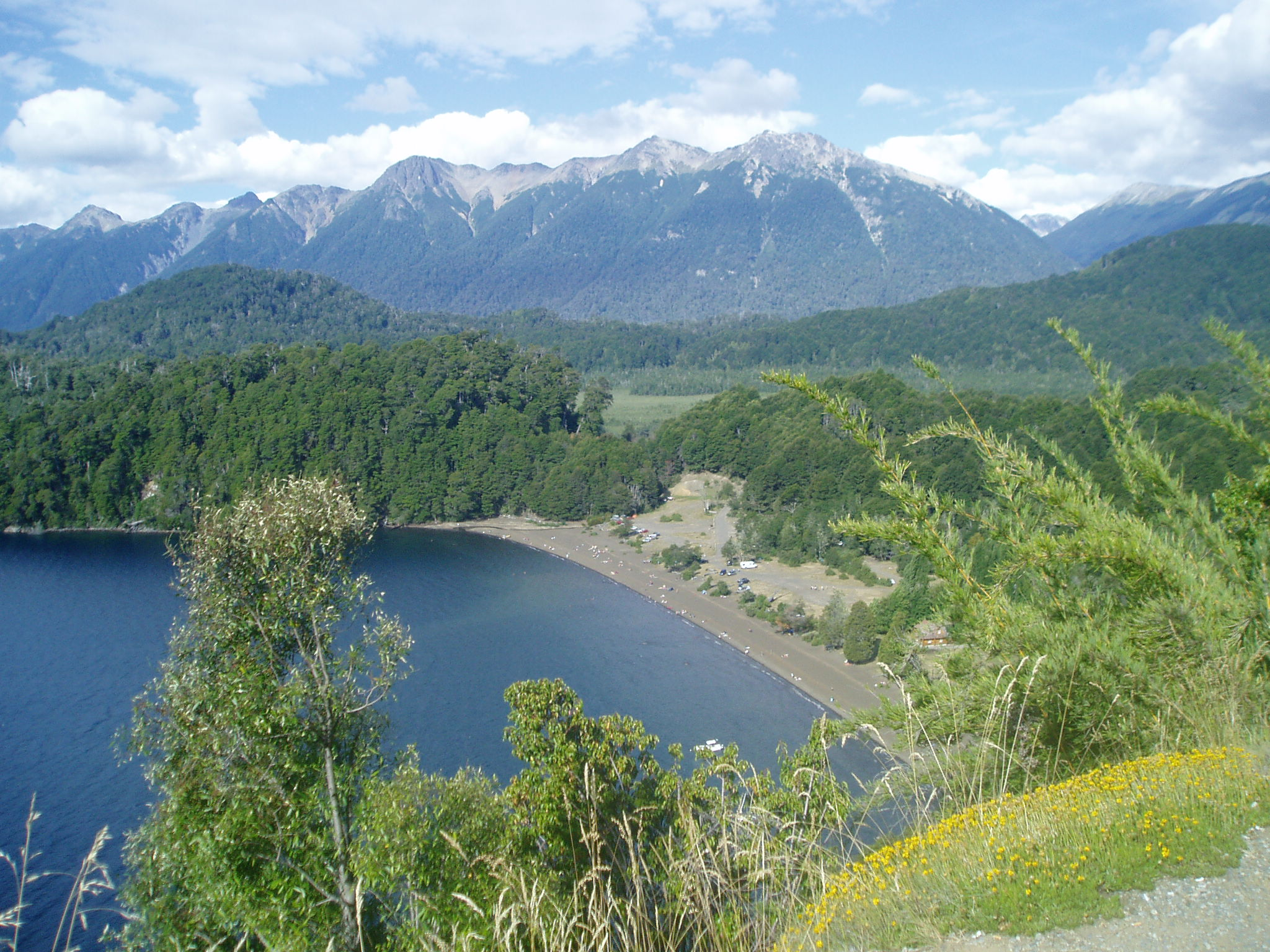
Southern shore of Lake Espejo viewed from the 231 National.

Espejo Lake (Spanish for Mirror Lake) is a lake of glacial tectonic origin located in southern Neuquén Province, Argentina. The lake lies near the town of Villa La Angostura, on the route known as the Road of the Seven Lakes.

Its name refers to the clean and quiet waters, which reflect the landscape like a mirror. The lake is fed by numerous streams bringing snow- and ice-melt from the nearby mountains. The shore of the lake alternates between volcanic sand beaches, juncus, and rock walls.

Among the most common activities in the area are mountain biking, sport fishing, windsurfing, trekking, and BMX riding.
