= 2024 FIM Motocross World Championship =

Champions of the world motocross 2024

The 2024 FIM Motocross World Championship was the 68th FIM Motocross World Championship season.

In the MXGP class, Jorge Prado started the season as the reigning champion after picking up his third world title in 2023. The reigning MX2 world champion, Andrea Adamo, defended his title as well.

== Race calendar and results ==
A provisional calendar was released on 12 October 2023. The championship will be contested over twenty rounds in Europe, Asia and South America.

=== MXGP ===
Round	Date	Grand Prix	Location	Pole position	Race 1 Winner	Race 2 Winner	Round Winner	Report
1	10 March	MXGP of Argentina	Villa La Angostura	(Slovenia) Tim Gajser	(Spain) Jorge Prado	(Slovenia) Tim Gajser	(Spain) Jorge Prado	
2	24 March	MXGP of Spain	intu Xanadú	(Spain) Jorge Prado	(Spain) Jorge Prado	(Spain) Jorge Prado	(Spain) Jorge Prado	
3	7 April	(Sardinia) MXGP of Sardegna	Riola Sardo	(Spain) Jorge Prado	(Spain) Jorge Prado	(Spain) Jorge Prado	(Spain) Jorge Prado	
4	14 April	MXGP of Trentino	Pietramurata	(France) Romain Febvre	(France) Romain Febvre	(Spain) Jorge Prado	(Spain) Jorge Prado	
5	5 May	MXGP of Portugal	Águeda	(Slovenia) Tim Gajser	(Slovenia) Tim Gajser	(Netherlands) Jeffrey Herlings	(Latvia) Pauls Jonass	
6	12 May	MXGP of Galicia	Lugo	(Spain) Jorge Prado	(Spain) Jorge Prado	(Spain) Jorge Prado	(Spain) Jorge Prado	
7	19 May	MXGP of France	Saint-Jean-d'Angély	(France) Romain Febvre	(Slovenia) Tim Gajser	(Netherlands) Jeffrey Herlings	(Slovenia) Tim Gajser	
8	2 June	MXGP of Germany	Teutschenthal	(Slovenia) Tim Gajser	(Spain) Jorge Prado	(Spain) Jorge Prado	(Spain) Jorge Prado	
9	9 June	MXGP of Latvia	Ķegums	(Slovenia) Tim Gajser	(Netherlands) Jeffrey Herlings	(Spain) Jorge Prado	(Netherlands) Jeffrey Herlings	
10	16 June	MXGP of Italy	Maggiora	(Slovenia) Tim Gajser	(Slovenia) Tim Gajser	(Netherlands) Jeffrey Herlings	(Slovenia) Tim Gajser	
11	30 June	MXGP of Indonesia	Lombok	(Netherlands) Jeffrey Herlings	(Netherlands) Jeffrey Herlings	(Spain) Jorge Prado	(Spain) Jorge Prado	
12	7 July	MXGP of Indonesia	Lombok	(Netherlands) Jeffrey Herlings	(Netherlands) Jeffrey Herlings	(Netherlands) Jeffrey Herlings	(Netherlands) Jeffrey Herlings	
13	21 July	MXGP of Czech Republic	Loket	(Slovenia) Tim Gajser	(Netherlands) Jeffrey Herlings	(Slovenia) Tim Gajser	(Slovenia) Tim Gajser	
14	28 July	MXGP of Flanders	Lommel	(Spain) Jorge Prado	(Netherlands) Jeffrey Herlings	(Netherlands) Jeffrey Herlings	(Netherlands) Jeffrey Herlings	
15	11 August	MXGP of Sweden	Uddevalla	(Slovenia) Tim Gajser	(Spain) Jorge Prado	(Spain) Jorge Prado	(Spain) Jorge Prado	
16	18 August	MXGP of The Netherlands	Arnhem	(Netherlands) Glenn Coldenhoff	(Netherlands) Jeffrey Herlings	(Netherlands) Jeffrey Herlings	(Netherlands) Jeffrey Herlings	
17	25 August	MXGP of Switzerland	Frauenfeld	(Spain) Jorge Prado	(Slovenia) Tim Gajser	(Slovenia) Tim Gajser	(Slovenia) Tim Gajser	
18	8 September	MXGP of Turkey	Afyonkarahisar	(Slovenia) Tim Gajser	(Switzerland) Jeremy Seewer	(Spain) Jorge Prado	(Spain) Jorge Prado	
19	16 September	MXGP of China	Shanghai	Race Cancelled	(France) Romain Febvre	(Spain) Jorge Prado	(Spain) Jorge Prado	
20	29 September	MXGP of Castilla–La Mancha	Cózar	(Spain) Jorge Prado	(Spain) Jorge Prado	(Netherlands) Jeffrey Herlings	(Spain) Jorge Prado	

=== MX2 ===
Round	Date	Grand Prix	Location	Pole position	Race 1 Winner	Race 2 Winner	Round Winner	Report
1	10 March	MXGP of Argentina	Villa La Angostura	(Belgium) Lucas Coenen	(Germany) Simon Längenfelder	(Netherlands) Kay de Wolf	(Netherlands) Kay de Wolf	
2	24 March	MXGP of Spain	intu Xanadú	(Netherlands) Kay de Wolf	(Netherlands) Kay de Wolf	(Italy) Andrea Adamo	(Netherlands) Kay de Wolf	
3	7 April	(Sardinia) MXGP of Sardegna	Riola Sardo	(Netherlands) Kay de Wolf	(Belgium) Lucas Coenen	(Netherlands) Kay de Wolf	(Netherlands) Kay de Wolf	
4	14 April	MXGP of Trentino	Pietramurata	(Italy) Andrea Adamo	(Netherlands) Kay de Wolf	(Germany) Simon Längenfelder	(Belgium) Liam Everts	
5	5 May	MXGP of Portugal	Águeda	(Belgium) Liam Everts	(Belgium) Liam Everts	(Belgium) Liam Everts	(Belgium) Liam Everts	
6	12 May	MXGP of Galicia	Lugo	(France) Thibault Benistant	(Italy) Andrea Adamo	(Belgium) Lucas Coenen	(Belgium) Lucas Coenen	
7	19 May	MXGP of France	Saint-Jean-d'Angély	(Belgium) Lucas Coenen	(Belgium) Lucas Coenen	(Belgium) Lucas Coenen	(Belgium) Lucas Coenen	
8	2 June	MXGP of Germany	Teutschenthal	(Netherlands) Kay de Wolf	(Belgium) Lucas Coenen	(Belgium) Lucas Coenen	(Belgium) Lucas Coenen	
9	9 June	MXGP of Latvia	Ķegums	(Netherlands) Kay de Wolf	(Netherlands) Kay de Wolf	(Belgium) Sacha Coenen	(Belgium) Sacha Coenen	
10	16 June	MXGP of Italy	Maggiora	(Belgium) Liam Everts	(Belgium) Liam Everts	(Belgium) Sacha Coenen	(Belgium) Sacha Coenen	
11	30 June	(West Nusa Tenggara) MXGP of Lombok	Lombok	(Belgium) Lucas Coenen	(Netherlands) Kay de Wolf	(Netherlands) Kay de Wolf	(Netherlands) Kay de Wolf	
12	7 July	MXGP of West Nusa Tenggara	Lombok	(Belgium) Lucas Coenen	(Belgium) Lucas Coenen	(Belgium) Lucas Coenen	(Belgium) Lucas Coenen	
13	21 July	MXGP of Czech Republic	Loket	(Belgium) Lucas Coenen	(Belgium) Lucas Coenen	(Netherlands) Kay de Wolf	(Netherlands) Kay de Wolf	
14	28 July	MXGP of Flanders	Lommel	(Netherlands) Kay de Wolf	(Netherlands) Kay de Wolf	(Germany) Simon Längenfelder	(Netherlands) Kay de Wolf	
15	11 August	MXGP of Sweden	Uddevalla	(Netherlands) Kay de Wolf	(Belgium) Lucas Coenen	(Belgium) Lucas Coenen	(Belgium) Lucas Coenen	
16	18 August	MXGP of The Netherlands	Arnhem	(Belgium) Lucas Coenen	(Netherlands) Kay de Wolf	(Belgium) Lucas Coenen	(Belgium) Lucas Coenen	
17	25 August	MXGP of Switzerland	Frauenfeld	(Belgium) Lucas Coenen	(Netherlands) Kay de Wolf	(Germany) Simon Längenfelder	(Netherlands) Kay de Wolf	
18	8 September	MXGP of Turkey	Afyonkarahisar	(Belgium) Liam Everts	(Belgium) Lucas Coenen	(Belgium) Lucas Coenen	(Belgium) Lucas Coenen	
19	16 September	MXGP of China	Shanghai	Race Cancelled	(Belgium) Lucas Coenen	(Belgium) Lucas Coenen	(Belgium) Lucas Coenen	
20	29 September	MXGP of Castilla–La Mancha	Cózar	(Belgium) Lucas Coenen	(Belgium) Lucas Coenen	(Belgium) Lucas Coenen	(Belgium) Lucas Coenen	

=== Grand Prix locations ===
Location of non-European Grands Prix in 2024.
Location of European Grands Prix in 2024.

== MXGP ==
=== Entry list ===
Officially Approved Teams & Riders
Team	Constructor	No	Rider	Rounds
Red Bull Gas Gas Factory Racing	Gas Gas	1	(Spain) Jorge Prado	All
Kawasaki Racing Team MXGP	Kawasaki	3	(France) Romain Febvre	1–8, 13–20
Kawasaki Racing Team MXGP	Kawasaki	91	(Switzerland) Jeremy Seewer	All
De Baets Yamaha MX Team	Yamaha	6	(France) Benoît Paturel	2–17
Monster Energy Yamaha Factory MXGP Team	Yamaha	10	(Netherlands) Calvin Vlaanderen	1–16
Monster Energy Yamaha Factory MXGP Team	Yamaha	93	(Belgium) Jago Geerts	1, 14, 16–17
Monster Energy Yamaha Factory MXGP Team	Yamaha	98	(United Kingdom) Todd Kellett	3
Monster Energy Yamaha Factory MXGP Team	Yamaha	132	(Italy) Andrea Bonacorsi	5–20
Monster Energy Yamaha Factory MXGP Team	Yamaha	959	(France) Maxime Renaux	1–2, 17–20
Schmicker Racing	KTM	17	(Norway) Cornelius Tøndel	1–13, 15–18
Schmicker Racing	KTM	811	(United Kingdom) Adam Sterry	2–7, 13–14, 16
Team Ship to Cycle Honda Motoblouz SR	Honda	24	(Norway) Kevin Horgmo	All
Team Ship to Cycle Honda Motoblouz SR	Honda	92	(Switzerland) Valentin Guillod	All
JM Honda Racing	Honda	32	(Belgium) Brent Van Doninck	1, 13–18, 20
JM Honda Racing	Honda	37	(Sweden) Tim Edberg	3–6
Team HRC	Honda	39	(Netherlands) Roan van de Moosdijk	3–4
Team HRC	Honda	70	(Spain) Rubén Fernández	1, 17–20
Team HRC	Honda	243	(Slovenia) Tim Gajser	All
Standing Construct Honda MXGP	Honda	41	(Latvia) Pauls Jonass	1–8
Standing Construct Honda MXGP	Honda	303	(Italy) Alberto Forato	1, 13–20
JK Racing Yamaha	Yamaha	60	(Sweden) Anton Nagy	2–7
JK Racing Yamaha	Yamaha	517	(Sweden) Isak Gifting	1–7, 10–17
Red Bull KTM Factory Racing	KTM	84	(Netherlands) Jeffrey Herlings	All
SixtySeven Racing Team	Husqvarna	87	(Switzerland) Kevin Brumann	1–4, 7–10, 13–20
SixtySeven Racing Team	Husqvarna	991	(Germany) Mark Scheu	2–10, 13–17, 20
Nestaan Husqvarna Factory Racing	Husqvarna	101	(Italy) Mattia Guadagnini	5–20
MRT Racing Team Beta	Beta	128	(Italy) Ivo Monticelli	1–10, 13–18, 20
MRT Racing Team Beta	Beta	919	(United Kingdom) Ben Watson	1–8
JWR Honda	Honda	161	(Sweden) Alvin Östlund	2–6, 8–10, 14–16, 20
Fantic Factory Racing MXGP	Fantic	189	(Netherlands) Brian Bogers	3–11, 13–20
Fantic Factory Racing MXGP	Fantic	259	(Netherlands) Glenn Coldenhoff	All
TEM JP253 KTM Racing Team	KTM	253	(Slovenia) Jan Pancar	All
Gabriel SS24 KTM	KTM	326	(United Kingdom) Josh Gilbert	1–2, 5–10, 13–18, 20
Wild Card Teams & Riders
Team	Constructor	No	Rider	Rounds
Yamaha Motor Switzerland	Yamaha	4	(Switzerland) Arnaud Tonus	17
Raceline Husqvarna Tdub Racing Team	Husqvarna	7	(Australia) Todd Waters	19
AIT Racing Team	Yamaha	9	(Bulgaria) Petar Petrov	14, 16
Cat Moto Bauerschmidt Husqvarna	Husqvarna	13	(Switzerland) Loris Freidig	17
Cat Moto Bauerschmidt Husqvarna	Husqvarna	131	(Germany) Cato Nickel	7–8, 14–15, 17, 20
SC Sporthomes Husqvarna	Husqvarna	14	(South Africa) Tristan Purdon	13
Apico Honda	Honda	16	(United Kingdom) Tom Grimshaw	7
AMX Racing Team	KTM	20	(Denmark) Victor Kleemann	8
KTM Sarholz Racing Team	KTM	29	(Germany) Henry Jacobi	8
KTM Sarholz Racing Team	KTM	35	(Germany) Lukas Platt	8
KTM Sarholz Racing Team	KTM	300	(Germany) Noah Ludwig	8
Yamaha Johansson MPE	Yamaha	30	(Sweden) Eddie Hjortmarker	15
JH-MX Service	Gas Gas	34	(Netherlands) Micha-Boy de Waal	16
Osička MX Team	KTM	45	(Slovakia) Tomáš Kohút	8–9, 13, 17
Osička MX Team	KTM	701	(Austria) Marcel Stauffer	17
Team Husqvarna Scandinavia	Husqvarna	52	(Sweden) Albin Gerhardsson	9, 13, 15
Gas Gas Racing Team	Gas Gas	56	(Australia) Kirk Gibbs	19
KMP Honda Racing Team powered by Krettek	Honda	57	(Latvia) Edvards Bidzāns	13, 15
Coop Põlva/Mehka/Alcantra	Gas Gas	62	(Estonia) Andero Lusbo	9
Superior Moto Gas Gas Switzerland	Gas Gas	65	(Switzerland) Robin Scheiben	17
Superior Moto Gas Gas Switzerland	Gas Gas	137	(Liechtenstein) Luca Bruggmann	17
KTM Kosak Team	KTM	71	(Germany) Maximilian Spies	2–5, 8–10, 13–17
KTM Kosak Team	KTM	226	(Germany) Tom Koch	2–4, 8–9, 13–17, 20
Agroservimotos Honda	Honda	76	(Chile) Sergio Villaronga	1
Ducati Corse R&D – Maddii Racing Team	Ducati	77	(Italy) Alessandro Lupino	20
Ducati Corse R&D – Maddii Racing Team	Ducati	222	(Italy) Antonio Cairoli	16
STC Sturm Racing Team	Yamaha	90	(Germany) Justin Trache	4, 8
	Honda	99	(China) Wang Junkai	19
AQVA IDA-VIRU Racing Team	KTM	104	(Estonia) Aleksei Vinogradov	9, 17
Team Honda Pighetti Racing	Honda	107	(Netherlands) Lars van Berkel	1
RS-Shop KTM Chile	KTM	110	(Chile) Matías Pavez	1
	Husqvarna	113	(Argentina) Emiliano Castillo	1
GCC Swiss Racing Team	Husqvarna	119	(Switzerland) Nicolas Bender	17
SMR Racing	Gas Gas	121	(Spain) Lucas Bodega	2, 6
DL Competicion	Honda	124	(Argentina) Lucas Sendón	1
KTM Silve Racing	KTM	142	(Finland) Jere Haavisto	4, 9, 15
Castrol – Axion Sport MX Team	Husqvarna	144	(Uruguay) Nicolás Rolando	1
Castrol – Axion Sport MX Team	Husqvarna	707	(Argentina) Víctor Dario Arco	1
Star Racing Team	Yamaha	157	(Turkey) Ata Kuzu	18
Honda Dream Racing Bells	Honda	163	(Japan) Yuki Okura	11–12
Kawasaki Racing Team	Kawasaki	179	(Argentina) Joaquín Poli	1
MBP Motocross Team	KTM	181	(Lithuania) Domantas Jazdauskas	9
FZ Motorsport	KTM	200	(Italy) Filippo Zonta	10
Effective Racing	TM	201	(Czech Republic) František Smola	13
	Yamaha	213	(China) Pu Yang	19
Millionaire Racing Team	Honda	223	(Italy) Giuseppe Tropepe	4, 7, 10, 13
Millionaire Racing Team	Honda	228	(Italy) Emilio Scuteri	4, 7, 10
Enduro Koch Racing	Husqvarna	224	(Czech Republic) Jakub Terešák	3–4, 8, 13
Yamaha Monster Energy Geração	Yamaha	238	(Brazil) Fábio Santos	1, 20
Brouwer Motors	KTM	241	(Netherlands) Michel Hoenson	14, 16
Motos VR Yamaha	Yamaha	247	(Portugal) Luís Outeiro	5
Promoto Husqvarna Racing Team	Husqvarna	249	(Czech Republic) Rudolf Plch	13
Becker Racing	Gas Gas	260	(Germany) Nico Koch	8
Becker Racing	Gas Gas	278	(Belgium) Thomas Vermijl	6, 8, 13–14, 16
Motostar Racing	Husqvarna	297	(Sweden) Anton Gole	15
Pardi Racing KTM Motocross	KTM	311	(Italy) Mirko Dal Bosco	4, 10
SHR Motorsports	Yamaha	313	(Czech Republic) Petr Polák	8, 13, 16
SHR Motorsports	Yamaha	491	(Germany) Paul Haberland	8
SHR Motorsports	Yamaha	822	(Netherlands) Mike Bolink	8, 16
Orion Racing Team	KTM	322	(Slovakia) Pavol Repčák	13
Team Borz	Honda	333	(Italy) Luca Borz	4
Team Rizqy Motorsport	KTM	336	(Australia) Lewis Stewart	11
FM CAMI Racing	Honda	337	(Italy) Yuri Quarti	8, 10, 17
FM CAMI Racing	Honda	771	(Italy) Simone Croci	10
KL Racing Team	KTM	365	(Denmark) Nikolaj Skovgaard	2, 4, 7–10, 13–18, 20
Camping Cupido	Yamaha	380	(Netherlands) Marcel Conijn	16
KRD.gr - The Family Motors	TM	388	(Greece) Panagiotis Kouzis	13, 18
Martin Racing Technology	Honda	397	(Italy) Yuri Pasqualini	4
MB Racing Team	Honda	399	(Italy) Pietro Trinchieri	4
MB Racing Team	Honda	430	(France) Christophe Charlier	4
MB Racing Team	Honda	878	(Italy) Stefano Pezzuto	10
	Gas Gas	403	(Argentina) Ezequiel Suárez	1
Crendon Tru7 Honda Racing	Honda	426	(United Kingdom) Conrad Mewse	14, 16
Yamaha Scandinavia/Motostar Racing	Yamaha	454	(Sweden) Liam Hanström	15
KTM Switzerland	KTM	474	(Belgium) Bryan Boulard	17
	Honda	494	(Argentina) Flavio Nicolás Sastre	1
FRT Motorsport	Kawasaki	499	(Italy) Emanuele Alberio	4
Fantic Nederland	Fantic	521	(Netherlands) Boris Blanken	14–16
MSR Kawasaki	Kawasaki	533	(New Zealand) Dylan Walsh	17
Brouwer Motors/FiveThreeSeven	KTM	537	(Netherlands) Damian Wedage	15–16
Tech32 Racing MX	KTM	570	(France) Pierre Goupillon	7
Bike It Kawasaki Racing Team	Kawasaki	579	(United Kingdom) Bobby Bruce	13–15
MR Motorcycle Kawasaki	Kawasaki	596	(Ecuador) Andrés Benenaula	1
MXMagmum	Gas Gas	637	(Latvia) Tomass Šileika	3, 9
MXMagmum	Gas Gas	684	(Latvia) Uldis Freibergs	9, 13, 15
MQ World Factory Racing Team	KTM	644	(Italy) Ismaele Guarise	4, 10
Ausió Racing Team	Yamaha	692	(Spain) Ander Valentín	2, 6
	Husqvarna	816	(China) He Rongzhe	19
Kapers Motoren	TM	826	(Netherlands) Nick Leerkes	14, 16
Dadaş Motor Yamaha/MOVERS	Yamaha	830	(Turkey) Batuhan Demiryol	18
GPX Motocross Team	Husqvarna	838	(Italy) Paolo Ermini	10
MX88 Motorsport	KTM	881	(Netherlands) Freek van der Vlist	16
Factory Bike Mundo	Yamaha	909	(Ecuador) Miguel Cordovez	1
Hfour Racing Kawasaki	Kawasaki	949	(Switzerland) Alessandro Contessi	17
Djienem MX Racing Team	KTM	988	(France) Lionel Kerhoas	11–12

==== Riders Championship ====
Points are awarded to the top-ten finishers of the qualifying race, in the following format:

Position	1st	2nd	3rd	4th	5th	6th	7th	8th	9th	10th
Points	10	9	8	7	6	5	4	3	2	1

Points are awarded to finishers of the main races, in the following format:

Position	1st	2nd	3rd	4th	5th	6th	7th	8th	9th	10th	11th	12th	13th	14th	15th	16th	17th	18th	19th	20th
Points	25	22	20	18	16	15	14	13	12	11	10	9	8	7	6	5	4	3	2	1

Pos	Nr	Rider	Bike	ARG (Argentina)		ESP (Spain)		SAR (Sardinia)		TRE		POR (Portugal)		GAL		FRA (France)		GER (Germany)		LAT (Latvia)		ITA (Italy)		WNT (West Nusa Tenggara)		LOM (West Nusa Tenggara)		CZE (Czech Republic)		FLA (Flanders)		SWE (Sweden)		NED (Netherlands)		SUI (Switzerland)		TUR (Turkey)		CHN (China)		CAS		Points
1	1	(Spain) Jorge Prado	Gas Gas	1^{+7}	2	1^{+10}	1	1^{+10}	1	3	1	15^{+4}	12	1^{+10}	1	2^{+7}	5	1^{+9}	1	7^{+9}	1	2^{+5}	Ret	2^{+9}	1	4^{+7}	5	2^{+9}	2	2^{+10}	2	1^{+9}	1	2^{+8}	2	3^{+10}	3	3^{+9}	1	2	1	1^{+10}	4	996
2	243	(Slovenia) Tim Gajser	Honda	5^{+10}	1	2^{+9}	2	2^{+9}	2	2^{+9}	4	1^{+10}	10	6^{+9}	3	1^{+9}	4	3^{+10}	2	2^{+10}	2	1^{+10}	2	3^{+8}	5	2^{+9}	2	3^{+10}	1	5^{+8}	4	2^{+10}	3	4^{+6}	3	1^{+9}	1	4^{+10}	2	17	2	2^{+8}	3	986
3	84	(Netherlands) Jeffrey Herlings	KTM	8^{+5}	7	3^{+7}	4	3^{+8}	3	4^{+7}	7	Ret^{+9}	1	4^{+8}	2	6^{+1}	1	2^{+7}	3	1^{+5}	3	3^{+9}	1	1^{+10}	2	1^{+10}	1	1^{+8}	4	1^{+9}	1	5^{+4}	2	1^{+7}	1	2^{+8}	2	10^{+8}	3	3	4	6^{+9}	1	944
4	91	(Switzerland) Jeremy Seewer	Kawasaki	7^{+4}	5	7^{+5}	6	11^{+7}	7	5^{+6}	3	Ret	5	5^{+5}	6	4^{+8}	6	9^{+6}	6	14	6	5^{+7}	3	6^{+7}	3	5^{+6}	6	4^{+7}	6	10^{+1}	5	4^{+6}	8	6^{+1}	6	4^{+6}	5	1^{+5}	6	10	Ret	3^{+7}	5	686
5	3	(France) Romain Febvre	Kawasaki	2^{+9}	3	4^{+3}	3	6	5	1^{+10}	5	3^{+8}	4	2^{+7}	4	3^{+10}	2	Ret^{+8}	DNS									6^{+5}	5	4^{+4}	3	3^{+8}	4	5^{+9}	5	6^{+2}	4	7^{+7}	4	1	3	4	2	651
6	259	(Netherlands) Glenn Coldenhoff	Fantic	6	8	6^{+6}	DSQ	4^{+4}	9	9^{+8}	6	4^{+5}	13	7	5	8	13	6	5	3^{+8}	4	7	10	7^{+1}	11	6^{+5}	8	9^{+3}	7	6	6	9^{+1}	6	3^{+10}	4	7^{+5}	Ret	6	5	5	8	11^{+3}	7	601
7	10	(Netherlands) Calvin Vlaanderen	Yamaha	9^{+2}	9	9^{+2}	5	7^{+5}	6	6^{+4}	2	20^{+7}	9	3^{+6}	7	7^{+5}	8	4^{+4}	4	6^{+7}	7	4^{+6}	5	4^{+6}	4	3^{+8}	3	5^{+6}	3	3^{+7}	12	6	5	14^{+5}	DNS									550
8	24	(Norway) Kevin Horgmo	Honda	12	10	11	9	10	10	12	12	10	6	Ret	14	11^{+6}	7	13	13	5	10	11^{+1}	14	9^{+5}	6	9	7	13	10	7^{+6}	7	17	7	8	10	11^{+4}	8	11	14	7	10	DNS	DNS	428
9	92	(Switzerland) Valentin Guillod	Honda	11^{+1}	11	10^{+4}	8	18^{+2}	15	7^{+2}	9	18	DNS	8^{+4}	9	Ret	11	12	9	10	8	9^{+4}	13	8^{+4}	13	7^{+3}	4	Ret^{+2}	9	25	25	10^{+5}	9	16	Ret	8	11	14	13	13	14	8^{+1}	6	388
10	132	(Italy) Andrea Bonacorsi	Yamaha									6	8	Ret	11	10	9	7^{+1}	19	9^{+2}	Ret	8^{+2}	12	5^{+2}	12	10^{+2}	10	17	11	8^{+2}	9	15	13	7	9	12	10	5^{+2}	8	12	7	7^{+2}	14	340
11	189	(Netherlands) Brian Bogers	Fantic					8^{+3}	11	16	14	5	7	10	12	9^{+3}	12	8	11	4^{+3}	5	6^{+8}	4	DNS	DNS			10	12	9^{+5}	13	Ret^{+7}	DNS	12	12	14	16	15	16	14	15	14	Ret	326
12	101	(Italy) Mattia Guadagnini	Husqvarna									17	14	13^{+3}	8	13	17	11^{+3}	10	13^{+6}	9	14^{+3}	7	10	7	8^{+4}	12	8^{+4}	16	16	10	18	17	11^{+3}	7	13	13	12^{+3}	10	9	9	Ret	DNS	307
13	253	(Slovenia) Jan Pancar	KTM	15	14	20	14	23	23	15	11	9	16	14	17	14	14	22	16	18	14	12	8	12^{+3}	9	13	9	14	14	21	19	8^{+3}	11	20	17	10	Ret	16^{+1}	9	8	5	10	10	287
14	41	(Latvia) Pauls Jonass	Honda	3^{+8}	4	8	7	5^{+6}	4	8^{+5}	10	2^{+6}	2	9^{+2}	10	5	3	5^{+5}	Ret																									274
15	17	(Norway) Cornelius Tøndel	KTM	14	17	12	16	16	14	17^{+3}	20	12	3	11^{+1}	15	22	23	15	12	8^{+4}	11	16	Ret	15	8	14	14	Ret	DNS			14	18	13	Ret	18	Ret	17	20					197
16	6	(France) Benoît Paturel	Yamaha			22	19	20	24	11	8	16^{+1}	18	19	Ret	12^{+4}	10	14	7	Ret	16	10	9	13	10	12	13	7	13	13	14	12	16	Ret	DNS	DNS	DNS							197
17	959	(France) Maxime Renaux	Yamaha	4^{+6}	6	5^{+8}	DNS																													5^{+7}	7	2^{+4}	11	6	20	9^{+5}	9	181
18	517	(Sweden) Isak Gifting	Yamaha	16	15	15^{+1}	15	14	8	20	Ret	8^{+2}	Ret	12	13	DNS	DNS					23	6	11	14	11^{+1}	11	Ret	DNS	DNS	DNS	7^{+2}	10	19	Ret	Ret	14							166
19	303	(Italy) Alberto Forato	Honda	DNS	DNS																							16	15	12	16	13	14	9	11	9^{+1}	6	8	7	11	19	5^{+6}	12	160
20	226	(Germany) Tom Koch	KTM			19	10	12	13	14	18							20	8	DNS	DNS							12	24	11	11	16	15	21	16	22	Ret					17	13	111
21	919	(United Kingdom) Ben Watson	Beta	10	12	13	12	9	12	10^{+1}	13	7	Ret	Ret	16	16^{+2}	20	16	Ret																									110
22	161	(Sweden) Alvin Östlund	Honda			18	18	13^{+1}	18	18	17	11^{+3}	11	16	18			18	15	11	12	15	16							Ret	20	DNS	DNS	23	Ret							18	15	105
23	70	(Spain) Rubén Fernández	Honda	DNS	DNS																															17^{+3}	9	9^{+6}	12	4	6	13^{+4}	8	104
24	128	(Italy) Ivo Monticelli	Beta	13^{+3}	13	14	13	19	21	19	25	Ret	19	15	21	18	16	21	Ret	16	Ret	19	11					15	20	22	21	23	27	25	19	20	Ret	13	17			19	16	100
25	32	(Belgium) Brent Van Doninck	Honda	DNS	DNS																							11	8	17	8	11	12	18^{+2}	8	DNS	DNS	20	15			21	11	94
26	71	(Germany) Maximilian Spies	KTM			16	11	15	20	Ret	16	Ret	Ret					Ret	14	Ret^{+1}	Ret	17	Ret					19	17	15	15	22	Ret	17	15	Ret	12							76
27	87	(Switzerland) Kevin Brumann	Husqvarna	Ret	16	23	21	25	19	23	24					19	15	27	21	Ret	13	Ret	20					18	25	18	Ret	19	19	Ret	21	19	15	19	18	15	11	16	17	72
28	326	(United Kingdom) Josh Gilbert	KTM	DNS	DNS	DNS	DNS					21	15	17	22	17	19	17	18	15	Ret	DNS	DNS					26	Ret	24	22	28	23	Ret	22	16	19	18	19			15	18	50
29	811	(United Kingdom) Adam Sterry	KTM			21	17	17	17	21	22	13	Ret	18	19	DNS	DNS											Ret	DNS	19	Ret			28	20									28
30	163	(Japan) Yuki Okura	Honda																					14	15	15	15																	25
31	426	(United Kingdom) Conrad Mewse	Honda																											14^{+3}	17			24	14									21
32	988	(France) Lionel Kerhoas	KTM																					16	16	16	16																	20
33	93	(Belgium) Jago Geerts	Yamaha	DNS	DNS																									DNS	DNS			10	13	DNS	DNS							19
34	142	(Finland) Jere Haavisto	KTM							13	23									12	20											DNS	DNS											18
35	223	(Italy) Giuseppe Tropepe	Honda							Ret	Ret					15	21					13	Ret					Ret^{+1}	DNS															15
36	56	(Australia) Kirk Gibbs	Gas Gas																																					16	12			14
37	29	(Germany) Henry Jacobi	KTM															10^{+2}	31																									13
38	37	(Sweden) Tim Edberg	Honda					Ret	22	22	19	14	17	DNS	DNS																													13
39	222	(Italy) Antonio Cairoli	Ducati																															15^{+4}	Ret									10
40	4	(Switzerland) Arnaud Tonus	Yamaha																																	15	17							10
41	77	(Italy) Alessandro Lupino	Ducati																																							12	Ret	9
42	7	(Australia) Todd Waters	Husqvarna																																					20	13			9
43	45	(Slovakia) Tomáš Kohút	KTM															23	22	Ret	15							22	21							21	18							9
44	213	(China) Pu Yang	Yamaha																																					18	16			8
45	991	(Germany) Mark Scheu	Husqvarna			24	22	26	26	28	29	22	Ret	21	23	20	22	Ret	23	20	21	20	19					24	26	29	26	29	24	32	26	25	20					22	19	8
46	692	(Spain) Ander Valentín	Yamaha			17	20							20	20																													7
47	228	(Italy) Emilio Scuteri	Honda							Ret	15					Ret	Ret					21	Ret																					6
48	337	(Italy) Yuri Quarti	Honda															Ret	25			DNS	15													24	22							6
49	52	(Sweden) Albin Gerhardsson	Husqvarna																	19	17							Ret	DNS			21	21											6
50	684	(Latvia) Uldis Freibergs	Gas Gas																	17	19							29	29			27	30											6
51	99	(China) Wang Junkai	Honda																																					19	17			6
52	224	(Czech Republic) Jakub Terešák	Husqvarna					22	Ret	24	21							19	20									21	18															6
53	98	(United Kingdom) Todd Kellett	Yamaha					21	16																																			5
54	107	(Netherlands) Lars van Berkel	Honda	18	19																																							5
55	909	(Ecuador) Miguel Cordovez	Yamaha	17	Ret																																							4
56	300	(Germany) Noah Ludwig	KTM															32	17																									4
57	200	(Italy) Filippo Zonta	KTM																			25	17																					4
58	131	(Germany) Cato Nickel	Husqvarna													21	18	Ret	28											23	24	25	22			Ret	21					20	DNS	4
59	9	(Bulgaria) Petar Petrov	Yamaha																											Ret	18			Ret	Ret									3
60	238	(Brazil) Fábio Santos	Yamaha	22	18																																					Ret	DNS	3
61	771	(Italy) Simone Croci	Honda																			22	18																					3
62	637	(Latvia) Tomass Šileika	Gas Gas					Ret	Ret											Ret	18																							3
63	816	(China) He Rongzhe	Yamaha																																					Ret	18			3
64	878	(Italy) Stefano Pezzuto	Honda																			18	Ret																					3
65	881	(Netherlands) Freek van der Vlist	KTM																															27	18									3
66	60	(Sweden) Anton Nagy	Yamaha			25	23	24	25	26	27	19	20	DNS	DNS	23	DNS																											3
67	144	(Uruguay) Nicolás Rolando	Husqvarna	19	21																																							2
68	313	(Czech Republic) Petr Polák	Yamaha															26	26									25	19					29	23									2
69	297	(Sweden) Anton Gole	Husqvarna																													20	20											2
70	596	(Ecuador) Andrés Benenaula	Kawasaki	21	20																																							1
71	365	(Denmark) Nikolaj Skovgaard	KTM			27	24			32	33					25	24	30	33	Ret	23	24	22					32	34	Ret	29	33	31	34	25	28	26	21	22			23	20	1
72	76	(Chile) Sergio Villaronga	Honda	20	22																																							1
73	521	(Netherlands) Boris Blanken	Fantic																											20	23	30	29	26	Ret									1
74	14	(South Africa) Tristan Purdon	Husqvarna																									20	22															1
	388	(Greece) Panagiotis Kouzis	TM																									30	32									22	21					0
	311	(Italy) Mirko Dal Bosco	KTM							31	32											Ret	21																					0
	278	(Belgium) Thomas Vermijl	Gas Gas											22	25			31	30									33	33	28	27			35	28									0
	181	(Lithuania) Domantas Jazdauskas	KTM																	Ret	22																							0
	34	(Netherlands) Micha-Boy de Waal	Gas Gas																															22	Ret									0
	494	(Argentina) Flavio Nicolás Sastre	Honda	23	23																																							0
	157	(Turkey) Ata Kuzu	Yamaha																																			23	23					0
	121	(Spain) Lucas Bodega	Gas Gas			26	Ret							23	24																													0
	119	(Switzerland) Nicolas Bender	Husqvarna																																	30	23							0
	322	(Slovakia) Pavol Repčák	KTM																									23	31															0
	579	(United Kingdom) Bobby Bruce	Kawasaki																									Ret	23	Ret	Ret	DNS	DNS											0
	533	(New Zealand) Dylan Walsh	Kawasaki																																	23	Ret							0
	113	(Argentina) Emiliano Castillo	Husqvarna	24	24																																							0
	830	(Turkey) Batuhan Demiryol	Gas Gas																																			24	24					0
	57	(Latvia) Edvards Bidzāns	Honda																									28	27			24	25											0
	35	(Germany) Lukas Platt	KTM															25	24																									0
	104	(Estonia) Aleksei Vinogradov	KTM																	Ret	24															31	27							0
	260	(Germany) Nico Koch	Gas Gas															24	27																									0
	822	(Netherlands) Mike Bolink	Yamaha															29	29															33	24									0
	474	(Belgium) Bryan Boulard	KTM																																	29	24							0
	16	(United Kingdom) Tom Grimshaw	Honda													24	Ret																											0
	124	(Argentina) Lucas Sendón	Honda	25	25																																							0
	949	(Switzerland) Alessandro Contessi	Kawasaki																																	27	25							0
	430	(France) Christophe Charlier	Honda							25	Ret																																	0
	30	(Sweden) Eddie Hjortmarker	Yamaha																													26	26											0
	403	(Argentina) Ezequiel Suárez	Husqvarna	26	27																																							0
	241	(Netherlands) Michel Hoenson	KTM																											26	28			36	29									0
	499	(Italy) Emanuele Alberio	Kawasaki							30	26																																	0
	137	(Liechtenstein) Luca Bruggmann	Gas Gas																																	26	Ret							0
	249	(Czech Republic) Rudolf Plch	Husqvarna																									27	28															0
	380	(Netherlands) Marcel Conijn	Yamaha																															30	27									0
	826	(Netherlands) Nick Leerkes	TM																											27	Ret			31	Ret									0
	397	(Italy) Yuri Pasqualini	Honda							27	Ret																																	0
	20	(Denmark) Victor Kleemann	KTM															28	32																									0
	537	(Netherlands) Damian Wedage	KTM																													32	28	DNQ	DNQ									0
	644	(Italy) Ismaele Guarise	KTM							Ret	28											DNS	DNS																					0
	333	(Italy) Luca Borz	Honda							29	31																																	0
	201	(Czech Republic) František Smola	TM																									31	30															0
	454	(Sweden) Liam Hanström	Yamaha																													31	Ret											0
	90	(Germany) Justin Trache	Yamaha							Ret	34							DNS	DNS																									0
	110	(Chile) Matías Pavez	KTM	DSQ	26																																							0
	39	(Netherlands) Roan van de Moosdijk	Honda					Ret	Ret	DNS	DNS																																	0
	65	(Switzerland) Robin Scheiben	Gas Gas																																	Ret	Ret							0
	179	(Argentina) Joaquín Poli	Kawasaki	Ret	DNS																																							0
	247	(Portugal) Luís Outeiro	Yamaha									Ret	DNS																															0
	491	(Germany) Paul Haberland	Yamaha															Ret	DNS																									0
	62	(Estonia) Andero Lusbo	Gas Gas																	Ret	DNS																							0
	701	(Austria) Marcel Stauffer	KTM																																	Ret	DNS							0
	707	(Argentina) Víctor Dario Arco	Husqvarna	DNS	DNS																																							0
	399	(Italy) Pietro Trinchieri	Honda							DNS	DNS																																	0
	570	(France) Pierre Goupillon	KTM													DNS	DNS																											0
	838	(Italy) Paolo Ermini	Husqvarna																			DNS	DNS																					0
	336	(Australia) Lewis Stewart	KTM																					DNS	DNS																			0
	13	(Switzerland) Loris Freidig	Husqvarna																																	DNS	DNS							0
Pos	Nr	Rider	Bike	ARG (Argentina)		ESP (Spain)		SAR (Sardinia)		TRE		POR (Portugal)		GAL		FRA (France)		GER (Germany)		LAT (Latvia)		ITA (Italy)		WNT (West Nusa Tenggara)		LOM (West Nusa Tenggara)		CZE (Czech Republic)		FLA (Flanders)		SWE (Sweden)		NED (Netherlands)		SUI (Switzerland)		TUR (Turkey)		CHN (China)		CAS		Points

==== Manufacturers Championship ====
Pos	Bike	ARG (Argentina)		ESP (Spain)		SAR (Sardinia)		TRE		POR (Portugal)		GAL		FRA (France)		GER (Germany)		LAT (Latvia)		ITA (Italy)		WNT (West Nusa Tenggara)		LOM (West Nusa Tenggara)		CZE (Czech Republic)		FLA (Flanders)		SWE (Sweden)		NED (Netherlands)		SUI (Switzerland)		TUR (Turkey)		CHN (China)		CAS		Points
1	Honda	3^{+10}	1	2^{+9}	2	2^{+9}	2	2^{+9}	4	1^{+10}	2	6^{+9}	3	1^{+9}	3	3^{+10}	2	2^{+10}	2	1^{+10}	2	3^{+8}	5	2^{+9}	2	3^{+10}	1	5^{+8}	4	2^{+10}	3	4^{+6}	3	1^{+9}	1	4^{+10}	2	4	2	2^{+8}	3	1017
2	Gas Gas	1^{+7}	2	1^{+10}	1	1^{+10}	1	3	1	15^{+4}	12	1^{+10}	1	2^{+7}	5	1^{+9}	1	7^{+9}	1	2^{+5}	Ret	2^{+9}	1	4^{+7}	5	2^{+9}	2	2^{+10}	2	1^{+9}	1	2^{+8}	2	3^{+10}	3	3^{+9}	1	2	1	1^{+10}	4	996
3	KTM	8^{+5}	7	3^{+7}	4	3^{+8}	3	4^{+7}	7	9^{+9}	1	4^{+8}	2	6^{+1}	1	2^{+7}	3	1^{+5}	3	3^{+9}	1	1^{+10}	2	1^{+10}	1	1^{+8}	4	1^{+9}	1	5^{+4}	2	1^{+7}	1	2^{+8}	2	10^{+8}	3	3	4	6^{+9}	1	956
4	Kawasaki	2^{+9}	3	4^{+5}	3	6^{+7}	5	1^{+10}	3	3^{+8}	4	2^{+7}	4	3^{+10}	2	9^{+8}	6	14	6	5^{+7}	3	6^{+7}	3	5^{+6}	6	4^{+7}	5	4^{+4}	3	3^{+8}	4	5^{+9}	5	4^{+6}	4	1^{+7}	4	1	3	3^{+7}	2	867
5	Yamaha	4^{+6}	6	5^{+8}	5	7^{+5}	6	6^{+4}	2	6^{+7}	8	3^{+6}	7	7^{+5}	8	4^{+4}	4	6^{+7}	7	4^{+6}	5	4^{+6}	4	3^{+8}	3	5^{+6}	3	3^{+7}	9	6^{+2}	5	7^{+5}	9	5^{+7}	7	2^{+4}	8	6	7	7^{+5}	9	748
6	Fantic	6	8	6^{+6}	DSQ	4^{+4}	9	9^{+8}	6	4^{+5}	7	7	5	8^{+3}	12	6	5	3^{+8}	4	6^{+8}	4	7^{+1}	11	6^{+5}	8	9^{+3}	7	6^{+5}	6	9^{+7}	6	3^{+10}	4	7^{+5}	16	6	5	5	8	11^{+3}	7	643
7	Husqvarna	19	16	23	21	22	19	23	21	17	14	13^{+3}	8	13	15	11^{+3}	10	13^{+6}	9	14^{+3}	7	10	7	8^{+4}	12	8^{+4}	16	16	10	18	17	11^{+3}	7	13	13	12^{+3}	10	9	9	16	17	327
8	Beta	10^{+3}	12	13	12	9	12	10^{+1}	13	7	19	15	16	16^{+2}	16	16	Ret	16	Ret	19	11					15	20	22	21	23	27	25	19	20	Ret	13	17			19	16	171
9	Ducati																															15^{+4}	Ret							12	Ret	19
	TM																									30	30	27	Ret			31	Ret			22	21					0
Pos	Bike	ARG (Argentina)		ESP (Spain)		SAR (Sardinia)		TRE		POR (Portugal)		GAL		FRA (France)		GER (Germany)		LAT (Latvia)		ITA (Italy)		WNT (West Nusa Tenggara)		LOM (West Nusa Tenggara)		CZE (Czech Republic)		FLA (Flanders)		SWE (Sweden)		NED (Netherlands)		SUI (Switzerland)		TUR (Turkey)		CHN (China)		CAS		Points

== MX2 ==
=== Entry list ===
Officially Approved Teams & Riders
Team	Constructor	No	Rider	Rounds
Monster Energy Triumph Racing	Triumph	8	(South Africa) Camden McLellan	1–5, 11–20
Monster Energy Triumph Racing	Triumph	11	(Denmark) Mikkel Haarup	All
Bike It Kawasaki MX2 Racing Team	Kawasaki	12	(United States) Jack Chambers	1–13, 15–17
Bike It Kawasaki MX2 Racing Team	Kawasaki	579	(United Kingdom) Bobby Bruce	1–9
Schmicker Racing	KTM	18	(Denmark) William Kleemann	2–10
Schmicker Racing	KTM	125	(Finland) Emil Weckman	1–2, 16–18
Schmicker Racing	KTM	484	(Netherlands) Dave Kooiker	3–10, 13
Red Bull KTM Factory Racing	KTM	19	(Belgium) Sacha Coenen	1–17, 20
Red Bull KTM Factory Racing	KTM	72	(Belgium) Liam Everts	2–19
Red Bull KTM Factory Racing	KTM	80	(Italy) Andrea Adamo	1–13, 15–20
Fantic Factory Racing MX2	Fantic	22	(Spain) David Braceras	All
Fantic Factory Racing MX2	Fantic	33	(Netherlands) Kay Karssemakers	2–13, 16–20
Red Bull Gas Gas Factory Racing	Gas Gas	28	(France) Marc-Antoine Rossi	1–4, 6–8
Red Bull Gas Gas Factory Racing	Gas Gas	516	(Germany) Simon Längenfelder	All
Monster Energy Yamaha Factory MX2 Team	Yamaha	44	(Netherlands) Rick Elzinga	1–19
Monster Energy Yamaha Factory MX2 Team	Yamaha	47	(Latvia) Kārlis Reišulis	11–20
Monster Energy Yamaha Factory MX2 Team	Yamaha	132	(Italy) Andrea Bonacorsi	1–4
Monster Energy Yamaha Factory MX2 Team	Yamaha	198	(France) Thibault Benistant	1–7, 17–20
WZ Racing KTM	KTM	51	(Spain) Oriol Oliver	1–18, 20
WZ Racing KTM	KTM	83	(France) Maxime Grau	6, 13
WZ Racing KTM	KTM	262	(Australia) Ryan Alexanderson	6, 16
WZ Racing KTM	KTM	427	(Norway) Håkon Fredriksen	1–2
Team HRC	Honda	73	(Italy) Ferruccio Zanchi	1–2, 6–20
Nestaan Husqvarna Factory Racing	Husqvarna	74	(Netherlands) Kay de Wolf	All
Nestaan Husqvarna Factory Racing	Husqvarna	96	(Belgium) Lucas Coenen	All
Team Leoparden Racing	Husqvarna	180	(Sweden) Leopold Ambjörnsson	1, 3–15, 17–18, 20
JM Honda Racing	Honda	214	(Norway) Håkon Østerhagen	1–7
JM Honda Racing	Honda	498	(Germany) Maximilian Werner	10, 16
F&H Racing Team	Kawasaki	319	(France) Quentin-Marc Prugnières	1–12, 16–18, 20
Wild Card Teams & Riders
Team	Constructor	No	Rider	Rounds
Dream Team	Fantic	15	(Italy) Mattia Barbieri	16
AIT Racing Team	KTM	18	(Denmark) William Kleemann	15–17, 20
AIT Racing Team	KTM	50	(France) Xavier Cazal	3
AIT Racing Team	KTM	123	(Italy) Federico Tuani	2–8, 13–17, 20
Wozniak MX Racing Team	Yamaha	27	(Denmark) Nicolai Skovbjerg	3
737 Performance Gas Gas	Gas Gas	31	(France) Tom Guyon	7
Iran National Motocross Team	KTM	40	(Iran) Peyman Mohammadalizadeh	18
Iran National Motocross Team	KTM	58	(Iran) Mohammad Danesh	18
Young Motion powered by Resa	KTM	42	(Finland) Sampo Rainio	4, 7–9, 13–14, 16
Young Motion powered by Resa	KTM	338	(Sweden) Filip Olsson	4, 7–9, 13–17
Young Motion powered by Resa	Gas Gas	505	(Sweden) Arvid Lüning	3–4, 7–9, 13–17
Team VRT Yamaha Racing	Yamaha	47	(Latvia) Kārlis Reišulis	10
Team VRT Yamaha Racing	Yamaha	115	(United States) Gavin Towers	10, 16
Team VRT Yamaha Racing	Yamaha	432	(Netherlands) Ivano van Erp	10, 16
Team Honda Racing Australia	Honda	48	(New Zealand) Brodie Connolly	19
Maggiora Park Racing Team	KTM	49	(Italy) Mattia Dusi	4, 10
Beddini Gas Gas Factory Juniors	Gas Gas	53	(Italy) Valerio Lata	6, 10
Beddini Gas Gas Factory Juniors	Gas Gas	515	(Denmark) Mads Fredsøe	6
Gas Gas Racing Argentina	Gas Gas	54	(Argentina) Tomás Matkovich	1
RS-Shop Gas Gas Chile	Gas Gas	55	(Chile) Ignacio Diez	1
	Yamaha	66	(China) Fang Xiangliang	19
Steels Dr. Jack TM Racing	TM	67	(Spain) Yago Martínez	2–7, 9–10, 13–17
KTM Kosak Team	KTM	75	(Netherlands) Bradley Mesters	16
Team Seven Motorsport	KTM	79	(Italy) Nicola Salvini	10
Team Seven Motorsport	KTM	212	(Italy) Alfio Pulvirenti	6
Honda Ecuador	Honda	88	(Ecuador) Italo Medina	1
Honda Ecuador	Honda	221	(Ecuador) Andrés Feicán	1
Team Ride Innovation Development	Husqvarna	95	(France) Enzo Casat	7
AQVA IDA-VIRU Racing Team	Triumph	106	(Estonia) Juri Vinogradov	17
Yamaha Monster Energy Geração	Yamaha	109	(Brazil) Guilherme Bresolin	1
Factory Bike Mundo	Husqvarna	112	(Ecuador) Pedro Suárez	1
VNT Racing Team	Gas Gas	114	(Belgium) Nicolas Vennekens	6–10, 13–17
	KTM	130	(Czech Republic) Radim Kraus	13
	Honda	139	(China) Zou Shaohui	19
Motofundador Yamaha Motor Portugal	Yamaha	141	(Portugal) Afonso Gomes	5
Husqvarna Uruguay	Husqvarna	146	(Uruguay) Alfonso Bratschi	1
Team #254	Gas Gas	155	(Germany) Tom Schröder	8
FlyOver Competition Gaerne	Kawasaki	171	(Italy) Morgan Bennati	2, 4, 7–8, 10
Gabriel SS24 KTM	KTM	172	(Netherlands) Cas Valk	3, 6, 10, 16
BumShaker Corsa	KTM	177	(Thailand) Jiraj Wannalak	11–12, 16–17
Husqvarna Motorcycles Slovenia	Husqvarna	183	(Slovenia) Jaka Peklaj	6, 10, 13, 20
MBP Motocross Team	KTM	188	(Lithuania) Erlandas Mackonis	9
	Husqvarna	191	(Argentina) Juan Ignacio Salgado	1
Eight Hundred Racing Team	KTM	227	(Czech Republic) Daniel Stehlík	13
Team Suzuki Chile Pro Circuit	Suzuki	251	(Chile) Iñaki Arbazua	1
Team VHR	Gas Gas	268	(France) Thibault Maupin	7
La Higuerita MX	KTM	288	(Argentina) Ignacio Liprandi	1
Cizz Racing	Gas Gas	302	(Turkey) Yiğit Ali Selek	18
JM Racing Astra Honda	Honda	325	(Indonesia) Delvintor Alfarizi	4–14
JM Racing Astra Honda	Honda	914	(Indonesia) Muhammad Arsenio Algifari	11–12
Abadia Motos	Honda	347	(Argentina) Juan Abadia	1
KTM Spain	KTM	368	(Spain) Samuel Nilsson	5–7, 13, 15, 20
Team TMX Competition	Yamaha	389	(France) Jules Pietre	7
De Baets Yamaha MX Team	Yamaha	401	(Netherlands) Lotte van Drunen	14
KMP Honda Racing Team powered by Krettek	Honda	408	(Netherlands) Scott Smulders	2, 7–8, 10, 13–14, 16
KL Racing Team	KTM	414	(Denmark) Oscar Brix	2, 4, 9–10, 13, 15–18, 20
ZL N2P s.r.o.	KTM	431	(Czech Republic) Tomáš Pikart	13
Q Racing Team	Gas Gas	437	(Czech Republic) Martin Venhoda	13
Osička MX Team	KTM	451	(Czech Republic) Julius Mikula	4–10, 13
KTM Sarholz Racing Team	KTM	470	(Germany) Peter König	8, 14
KTM SB Racing Team	KTM	489	(Netherlands) Jens Walvoort	All
MRA Racing Team	Gas Gas	490	(Slovakia) Jaroslav Katriňák	6, 13
SixtySeven Racing Team	Husqvarna	511	(Germany) Jan Krug	4, 8, 10, 14
Tognetti Racing Department	KTM	522	(Italy) Raffaele Giuzio	10
Team Rizqy Motorsport	KTM	529	(Indonesia) Nakami Vidi Makarim	11–12
Becker Racing	KTM	568	(Sweden) Max Pålsson	20
	KTM	601	(United Kingdom) Kelton Gwyther	16, 18, 20
K-Tech Aristo Cars Racing	KTM	616	(United Kingdom) Ollie Colmer	16
Yamalube Yamaha Racing	Yamaha	754	(Australia) Jayce Cosford	19
	KTM	767	(China) Li Haoyu	19
Mecamotor KTM	KTM	938	(Brazil) Rodolfo Bicalho	10
GT Racing KTM	KTM	961	(Sweden) August Frisk	10

==== Riders Championship ====
Points are awarded to the top-ten finishers of the qualifying race, in the following format:

Position	1st	2nd	3rd	4th	5th	6th	7th	8th	9th	10th
Points	10	9	8	7	6	5	4	3	2	1

Points are awarded to finishers of the main races, in the following format:

Position	1st	2nd	3rd	4th	5th	6th	7th	8th	9th	10th	11th	12th	13th	14th	15th	16th	17th	18th	19th	20th
Points	25	22	20	18	16	15	14	13	12	11	10	9	8	7	6	5	4	3	2	1

Pos	Nr	Rider	Bike	ARG (Argentina)		ESP (Spain)		SAR (Sardinia)		TRE		POR (Portugal)		GAL		FRA (France)		GER (Germany)		LAT (Latvia)		ITA (Italy)		WNT (West Nusa Tenggara)		LOM (West Nusa Tenggara)		CZE (Czech Republic)		FLA (Flanders)		SWE (Sweden)		NED (Netherlands)		SUI (Switzerland)		TUR (Turkey)		CHN (China)		CAS		Points
1	74	(Netherlands) Kay de Wolf	Husqvarna	2^{+9}	1	1^{+10}	2	2^{+10}	1	1^{+5}	8	3^{+1}	9	2^{+4}	3	3^{+8}	2	2^{+10}	2	1^{+10}	9	7^{+1}	6	1^{+9}	1	3^{+9}	6	3^{+5}	1	1^{+10}	2	7^{+10}	4	1^{+9}	4	1^{+9}	3	4^{+2}	2	3	2	7^{+8}	2	959
2	96	(Belgium) Lucas Coenen	Husqvarna	Ret^{+10}	3	3^{+7}	4	1^{+2}	2	10	9	16^{+6}	8	4^{+9}	1	1^{+10}	1	1^{+4}	1	2^{+9}	3	10	2	7^{+10}	2	1^{+10}	1	1^{+10}	4	5^{+9}	8	1^{+8}	1	2^{+10}	1	8^{+10}	7	1^{+9}	1	1	1	1^{+10}	1	939
3	516	(Germany) Simon Längenfelder	Gas Gas	1^{+7}	4	2^{+9}	3	7^{+6}	3	8^{+8}	1	2^{+7}	Ret	7^{+6}	9	4^{+4}	3	3^{+3}	3	4^{+8}	2	2^{+9}	8	6^{+8}	6	2^{+8}	5	2^{+7}	2	8^{+8}	1	3^{+7}	3	9	10	4^{+8}	1	2^{+7}	4	2	3	3^{+9}	9	852
4	72	(Belgium) Liam Everts	KTM			4^{+8}	6	8^{+5}	4	3^{+9}	2	1^{+10}	1	3	2	6^{+7}	5	7^{+8}	7	5^{+3}	4	1^{+10}	4	4^{+6}	7	5^{+5}	4	5^{+8}	3	6^{+6}	3	5^{+6}	5	3^{+8}	7	2^{+7}	5	3^{+10}	5	4	17			749
5	11	(Denmark) Mikkel Haarup	Triumph	5	2	5^{+6}	17	5^{+4}	9	9^{+7}	5	18	3	9	5	5^{+3}	6	10^{+7}	4	7^{+6}	6	8	7	3^{+5}	5	4^{+6}	3	4	5	4	7	2^{+9}	6	8^{+6}	9	5^{+5}	4	6^{+8}	3	5	4	6^{+5}	5	694
6	80	(Italy) Andrea Adamo	KTM	8^{+8}	5	6^{+5}	1	4	DSQ	7^{+10}	6	6	7	1	4	2^{+6}	4	4^{9}	6	13^{+7}	8	3^{5}	5	2^{+7}	3	6^{+1}	2	Ret^{+2}	DNS			4^{+1}	2	4^{+7}	2	11^{+6}	12	5^{+3}	9	6	5	2^{+2}	4	674
7	44	(Netherlands) Rick Elzinga	Yamaha	10	9	10	13	6^{+8}	8	4^{+6}	13	4^{+9}	2	8^{+5}	8	10	11	5^{+6}	5	8	5	6	14	9	11	15^{+4}	7	6^{+6}	6	2^{+7}	4	8^{+3}	9	6^{+4}	5	24^{+4}	6	8	6	8	18			555
8	19	(Belgium) Sacha Coenen	KTM	6^{+2}	10	12^{+3}	8	13^{+1}	6	Ret^{+3}	11	8	20	6^{+8}	7	15	9	13	10	3^{+5}	1	4^{7}	1	5	4	7^{+7}	13	Ret^{+9}	9	10^{+3}	6	10^{+4}	12	10^{+3}	6	15	15					DNS	DNS	456
9	8	(South Africa) Camden McLellan	Triumph	11	6	8	7	3^{+7}	5	5^{+1}	7	DNS	DNS											8^{+2}	9	8	8	7^{+3}	8	3^{+5}	9	6	8	5^{+5}	3	10^{+1}	11	7^{+4}	8	7	8	8^{+6}	11	424
10	73	(Italy) Ferruccio Zanchi	Honda	7^{+1}	8	18	12							11^{+7}	10	7^{+2}	8	8	8	15^{+2}	11	11^{+8}	9	14^{+4}	8	9	16	14^{+1}	12	7^{+2}	12	Ret^{+5}	7	12	13	6	9	17^{+6}	10	12	9	5^{+3}	6	393
11	198	(France) Thibault Benistant	Yamaha	3^{+6}	7	7^{+2}	5	10^{+9}	7	2^{+2}	4	5^{+3}	4	5^{+10}	6	DNS	DNS																			3^{+2}	8	11^{+5}	11	10	6	4	3	350
12	51	(Spain) Oriol Oliver	KTM	14	19	Ret	14	9	13	11	10	22	10	20^{+2}	17	14^{+1}	7	9^{+1}	9	6^{+4}	7	12^{+4}	11	16^{+1}	19	10^{+3}	9	8	10	12	11	21	19	13	14	12	20	13	12			11^{+1}	8	323
13	319	(France) Quentin-Marc Prugnières	Kawasaki	9	16	17	16	12	Ret	13	12	9^{+4}	6	12^{+3}	21	8^{+5}	10	6^{+5}	13	9^{+1}	12	9	10	10	12	11	20							14^{+1}	12	9	10	10	13			10^{+7}	7	319
14	47	(Latvia) Kārlis Reišulis	Yamaha																			18	21	13	13	12^{+2}	11	10^{+4}	7	9^{+4}	5	9^{+2}	10	7	Ret	7^{+3}	2	9^{+1}	7	9	7	9^{+4}	10	259
15	489	(Netherlands) Jens Walvoort	KTM	19	20	19	19	16	15	19	16	10^{+5}	5	17	18	11	16	17	14	11	10	19	17	15	10	14	12	9	13	11	10	13	14	18	Ret	17	16	12	14	14	12	13	20	259
16	22	(Spain) David Braceras	Fantic	21	13	16	15	15	Ret	18	Ret	12	14	DNS	DNS	16	15	16	12	14	Ret	17^{+2}	12	Ret	Ret	Ret	10	11	11	17	Ret	11	11	17	17	Ret	13	14	15	11	16	Ret	Ret	190
17	12	(United States) Jack Chambers	Kawasaki	12	11	13	11	Ret	16	14	14	11	15	15	23	13	14	12	16	17	16	16	Ret	11^{+3}	14	17	14	Ret	DNS			12	13	Ret	15	16	Ret							180
18	33	(Netherlands) Kay Karssemakers	Fantic			Ret	18	17	12	15	15	Ret	Ret	18	14	9	17	11^{+2}	11	12	14	Ret	15	12	Ret	13	Ret	Ret	DNS					21	Ret	14	14	15	20	13	10	12	12	173
19	28	(France) Marc-Antoine Rossi	Gas Gas	4^{+5}	12	9^{+4}	10	11	10	6^{+4}	19			10^{+1}	33	Ret^{+9}	DNS	DNS	DNS																									122
20	180	(Sweden) Leopold Ambjörnsson	Husqvarna	20	21			Ret	20	Ret	21	13	11	25	24	19	19	19	22	24	17	28	DNS	17	16	20	15	15	14	16	13	DNS	DNS			20	21	18	17			16	14	92
21	132	(Italy) Andrea Bonacorsi	Yamaha	13^{+3}	14	11^{+1}	9	21^{+3}	11	12	3																																	83
22	451	(Czech Republic) Julius Mikula	KTM							20	17	Ret	12	23	11	12	13	14	Ret	10	13	21	13					Ret	DNS															75
23	214	(Norway) Håkon Østerhagen	Honda	17^{+4}	17	14	20	Ret	22	17	26	7^{+8}	19	16	13	25	20																											62
24	67	(Spain) Yago Martínez	TM			23	Ret	24	Ret	16	18	20^{+2}	16	21	20	18	12			23	20	15	18					Ret	Ret	DSQ	DNS	14	15	Ret	DNS	13	Ret							60
25	172	(Netherlands) Cas Valk	KTM					14	DNS					13	12							14^{+3}	19											11^{+2}	11									58
26	53	(Italy) Valerio Lata	Gas Gas											14	15							5^{+6}	3																					55
27	505	(Sweden) Arvid Lüning	Gas Gas					18	14	23	20					24	Ret	18	20	16	Ret							18	20	15	14	17	16	23	20	21	18							50
28	123	(Italy) Federico Tuani	KTM			20	21	22	18	21	Ret	15	Ret	29	Ret	22	22	26	DNS									16	16	19	17	22	18	19	19	18	17					18	16	48
29	338	(Sweden) Filip Olsson	KTM							22	Ret					Ret	27	21	23	19	18							17	17	18	15	15	17	20	Ret	Ret	DNS							33
30	579	(United Kingdom) Bobby Bruce	Kawasaki	16	18	Ret	Ret	Ret	DNS	Ret	DNS	19	17	Ret	16	17	Ret	Ret	15	18	Ret																							32
31	432	(Netherlands) Ivano van Erp	Yamaha																			13	16											16	8									31
32	484	(Netherlands) Dave Kooiker	KTM					20	Ret	24	22	14	13	26	22	Ret	Ret	22	17	20	15	Ret	22					Ret	Ret															27
33	18	(Denmark) William Kleemann	KTM			24	23	Ret	19	Ret	27	17	18	30	27	30	25	25	19	21	19	32	Ret									16	21	22	21	Ret	22					15	Ret	24
34	125	(Finland) Emil Weckman	KTM	18	Ret	21	Ret																											Ret	18	19	19	16	16					20
35	368	(Spain) Samuel Nilsson	KTM									Ret	DNS	19	26	20	Ret											21	Ret			20	Ret									14	13	19
36	427	(Norway) Håkon Fredriksen	KTM	15	15	15	22																																					18
37	408	(Netherlands) Scott Smulders	Honda			Ret	24									28	23	Ret	DNS			30	29					19	18	14^{+1}	18			Ret	DNS									16
38	754	(Australia) Jayce Cosford	Yamaha																																					15	11			16
39	42	(Finland) Sampo Rainio	KTM							Ret	DNS					27	21	Ret	24	22	21							20	19	13	16			24	Ret									16
40	437	(Czech Republic) Martin Venhoda	Gas Gas																									12	15															15
41	177	(Thailand) Jiraj Wannalak	KTM																					18	17	16	18							29	26	23	23							15
42	139	(China) Zou Shaohui	Honda																																					16	14			12
43	325	(Indonesia) Delvintor Alfarizi	Honda							27	24	21	Ret	34	30	26	26	27	27	25	Ret	DNS	DNS	19	15	Ret	17	Ret	Ret	Ret	21													12
44	767	(China) Li Haoyu	KTM																																					18	13			11
45	75	(Netherlands) Bradley Mesters	KTM																															15	16									11
46	470	(Germany) Peter König	KTM															15	18											20	DNS													10
47	568	(Sweden) Max Pålsson	KTM																																							17	15	10
48	66	(China) Fang Xiangliang	Yamaha																																					17	15			10
49	490	(Slovakia) Jaroslav Katriňák	Gas Gas											27	25													13	Ret															8
50	414	(Denmark) Oscar Brix	KTM			25	26			28	29									28	24	34	30					24	24			19	20	28	25	25	25	DNS	DNS			20	18	7
51	183	(Slovenia) Jaka Peklaj	Husqvarna											32	31							25	27					DNS	DNS													19	17	6
52	27	(Denmark) Nicolai Skovbjerg	Yamaha					19	17																																			6
53	40	(Iran) Peyman Mohammadalizadeh	KTM																																			19	18					5
54	114	(Belgium) Nicolas Vennekens	Gas Gas											33	34	Ret	28	Ret	28	27	22	Ret	DNS					22	22	22	19	18	Ret	25	23	22	24							5
55	529	(Indonesia) Nakami Vidi Makarim	KTM																					21	20	19	19																	5
56	48	(New Zealand) Brodie Connolly	Honda																																					19	19			4
57	914	(Indonesia) M. Arsenio Algifari	Honda																					20	18	18	Ret																	3
58	268	(France) Thibault Maupin	Gas Gas													21	18																											3
59	302	(Turkey) Yiğit Ali Selek	Gas Gas																																			20	19					3
60	601	(United Kingdom) Kelton Gwyther	KTM																															26	24			Ret	DNS			21	19	2
61	515	(Denmark) Mads Fredsøe	Gas Gas											24	19																													2
62	115	(United States) Gavin Towers	Yamaha																			22	20											DNS	DNS									1
63	498	(Germany) Maximilian Werner	Honda																			20	25											Ret	DNS									1
64	511	(Germany) Jan Krug	Husqvarna							25	25							20	25			24	24							DNS	DNS													1
65	401	(Netherlands) Lotte van Drunen	Yamaha																											21	20													1
	171	(Italy) Morgan Bennati	Kawasaki			22	25			26	23					23	24	24	21			23	DNS																					0
	50	(France) Xavier Cazal	KTM					23	21																																			0
	227	(Czech Republic) Daniel Stehlík	KTM																									23	21															0
	109	(Brazil) Guilherme Bresolin	Yamaha	22	22																																							0
	83	(France) Maxime Grau	KTM											22	32													DNS	DNS															0
	616	(United Kingdom) Ollie Colmer	KTM																															Ret	22									0
	155	(Germany) Tom Schröder	Gas Gas															23	26																									0
	188	(Lithuania) Erlandas Mackonis	KTM																	26	23																							0
	79	(Italy) Nicola Salvini	KTM																			29	23																					0
	88	(Ecuador) Italo Medina	Honda	Ret	23																																							0
	112	(Ecuador) Pedro Suárez	KTM	23	29																																							0
	130	(Czech Republic) Radim Kraus	KTM																									Ret	23															0
	191	(Argentina) Juan Ignacio Salgado	Husqvarna	24	26																																							0
	54	(Argentina) Tomás Matkovich	Gas Gas	27	24																																							0
	146	(Uruguay) Alfonso Bratschi	Husqvarna	25	25																																							0
	49	(Italy) Mattia Dusi	KTM							29	28											26	28																					0
	347	(Argentina) Juan Abadia	Honda	26	28																																							0
	938	(Brazil) Rodolfo Bicalho	KTM																			33	26																					0
	106	(Estonia) Juri Vinogradov	Triumph																																	26	DNS							0
	55	(Chile) Ignacio Diez	Gas Gas	28	27																																							0
	961	(Sweden) August Frisk	KTM																			27	Ret																					0
	15	(Italy) Mattia Barbieri	Honda																															27	Ret									0
	262	(Australia) Ryan Alexanderson	KTM											28	29																			Ret	DNS									0
	212	(Italy) Alfio Pulvirenti	KTM											31	28																													0
	389	(France) Jules Pietre	Yamaha													29	Ret																											0
	251	(Chile) Iñaki Abarzua	Suzuki	Ret	30																																							0
	95	(France) Enzo Casat	Husqvarna													31	Ret																											0
	522	(Italy) Raffaele Giuzio	KTM																			31	Ret																					0
	288	(Argentina) Ignacio Liprandi	KTM	Ret	Ret																																							0
	431	(Czech Republic) Tomáš Pikart	KTM																									Ret	Ret															0
	141	(Portugal) Afonso Gomes	Yamaha									Ret	DNS																															0
	58	(Iran) Mohammad Danesh	KTM																																			Ret	DNS					0
	221	(Ecuador) Andrés Feicán	Honda	DNS	DNS																																							0
	31	(France) Tom Guyon	Gas Gas													DNS	DNS																											0
Pos	Nr	Rider	Bike	ARG (Argentina)		ESP (Spain)		SAR (Sardinia)		TRE		POR (Portugal)		GAL		FRA (France)		GER (Germany)		LAT (Latvia)		ITA (Italy)		WNT (West Nusa Tenggara)		LOM (West Nusa Tenggara)		CZE (Czech Republic)		FLA (Flanders)		SWE (Sweden)		NED (Netherlands)		SUI (Switzerland)		TUR (Turkey)		CHN (China)		CAS		Points

==== Manufacturers Championship ====
Pos	Bike	ARG (Argentina)		ESP (Spain)		SAR (Sardinia)		TRE		POR (Portugal)		GAL		FRA (France)		GER (Germany)		LAT (Latvia)		ITA (Italy)		WNT (West Nusa Tenggara)		LOM (West Nusa Tenggara)		CZE (Czech Republic)		FLA (Flanders)		SWE (Sweden)		NED (Netherlands)		SUI (Switzerland)		TUR (Turkey)		CHN (China)		CAS		Points
1	Husqvarna	2^{+10}	1	1^{+10}	2	1^{+10}	1	1^{+5}	8	3^{+6}	8	2^{+9}	1	1^{+10}	1	1^{+10}	1	1^{+10}	3	7^{+1}	2	1^{+10}	1	1^{+10}	1	1^{+10}	1	1^{+10}	2	1^{+10}	1	1^{+10}	1	1^{+10}	3	1^{+9}	1	1	1	1^{+10}	1	1105
2	KTM	6^{+8}	5	4^{+8}	1	4^{+5}	4	3^{+10}	2	1^{+10}	1	1^{+8}	2	2^{+7}	4	4^{+9}	6	3^{+7}	1	1^{+10}	1	2^{+7}	3	5^{+7}	2	5^{+9}	3	6^{+6}	3	4^{+6}	2	3^{+8}	2	2^{+7}	5	3^{+10}	5	4	5	2^{+2}	4	942
3	Gas Gas	1^{+7}	4	2^{+9}	3	7^{+6}	3	6^{+8}	1	2^{+7}	Ret	7^{+6}	9	4^{+9}	3	3^{+3}	3	4^{+8}	2	2^{+9}	8	6^{+8}	6	2^{+8}	5	2^{+7}	2	8^{+4}	1	3^{+7}	3	9	10	4^{+8}	1	2^{+7}	4	2	3	3^{+9}	9	864
4	Triumph	5	2	5^{+6}	7	3^{+7}	5	5^{+7}	5	18	3	9	5	5^{+3}	6	10^{+7}	4	7^{+6}	6	8	7	3^{+5}	5	4^{+6}	3	4^{+3}	5	3^{+5}	7	2^{+9}	6	5^{+6}	3	5^{+5}	4	6^{+8}	3	5	4	6^{+6}	5	741
5	Yamaha	3^{+6}	7	7^{+2}	5	6^{+9}	7	2^{+6}	3	4^{+9}	2	5^{+10}	6	10	11	5^{+6}	5	8	5	6	14	9	11	12^{+4}	7	6^{+6}	6	2^{+7}	4	8^{+3}	9	6^{+4}	5	3^{+4}	2	8^{+5}	6	8	6	4^{+4}	3	702
6	Honda	7^{+4}	8	14	12	Ret	22	17	24	7^{+8}	19	11^{+7}	10	7^{+2}	8	8	8	15^{+2}	11	11^{+8}	9	14^{+4}	8	9	16	14^{+1}	12	7^{+2}	12	Ret^{+5}	7	12	13	6	9	17^{+6}	10	12	9	5^{+3}	6	428
7	Kawasaki	9	11	13	11	12	16	13	12	9^{+4}	6	12^{+3}	16	8^{+5}	10	6^{+5}	13	9^{+1}	12	9	10	10^{+3}	12	11	14	Ret	DNS			12	13	14^{+1}	12	9	10	10	13			10^{+7}	7	369
8	Fantic	21	13	16	15	15	12	15	15	12	14	18	14	9	15	11^{+2}	11	12	14	17^{+2}	12	12	Ret	13	10	11	11	17	Ret	11	11	17	17	14	13	14	15	11	10	12	12	290
9	TM			23	Ret	24	Ret	16	18	20^{+2}	16	21	20	18	12			23	20	15	18					Ret	Ret	DSQ	DNS	14	15	Ret	DNS	13	Ret							60
	Suzuki	Ret	30																																							0
Pos	Bike	ARG (Argentina)		ESP (Spain)		SAR (Sardinia)		TRE		POR (Portugal)		GAL		FRA (France)		GER (Germany)		LAT (Latvia)		ITA (Italy)		WNT (West Nusa Tenggara)		LOM (West Nusa Tenggara)		CZE (Czech Republic)		FLA (Flanders)		SWE (Sweden)		NED (Netherlands)		SUI (Switzerland)		TUR (Turkey)		CHN (China)		CAS		Points

== See also ==
- 2024 FIM Women's Motocross World Championship
- 2024 European Motocross Championship
- 2024 Motocross des Nations
- 2024 FIM Supercross World Championship
- 2024 ProMX Championship
- 2024 AMA National Motocross Championship
