= Young Motion powered by Resa GP team =

Dutch Motocross world championship team

Young Motion powered by Resa
- Base: Haaksbergen, Netherlands
- Principal: Team ownership: Ron aan de Stegge; Wout ten Thije; Technical Manager: Rene Satink
- Rider(s): Motocross MX2: Samuel Nilsson; Filip Olsson; Martin Michelis
- Motorcycle: KTM and GasGas
- Tyres: various

The Young Motion powered by Resa GP team is a Dutch motocross racing team that competes in the Motocross World Championship and the Dutch Masters of Motocross in the MX2 class. The team is owned by Young Motion, a video agency from the Netherlands, which aims to help young privateers to make the next step

Founded in 2022 to compete at the Grand Prix level under the name Powered by Young Motion, the team started their first season by supporting Glen Meier in MX2 and Jens Walvoort and Meico Vettik in the European championship. Vettik impressed with a podium result and 11th overall after missing 3 races, while Meier scored the first world championship points for the team.

In 2023 the team expanded and set up a partnership with Resa Racing, a Yamaha dealer, to take care of the technical aspects of the team. The teamname was changed to Young Motion powered by Resa to reflect this. Riders were GP veteran Petr Polak and Dutch rookies Raf Meuwissen and Mike Bolink. Meuwissen was replaced during the season by French rider Saad Soulimani. Polak scored 23 points while Mike Bolink finished 10th overall in the Dutch Masters.

For 2024 the team dropped the association with Yamaha while continuing the partnership with Resa Racing. The team signed three Scandinavian riders for the MX2 class in Sampo Rainio, Arvid Lüning and Filip Olsson. They would compete in the majority of the European Grand Prix, the Dutch Masters and the Swedish and Finnish championship. It was a much improved season, with the team scoring 99 GP points. Lüning scored the team's best ever finish with a 14th in MX2 GP of Sardegna early in the season and followed that up with a 16th place finish in Latvia. At this GP Olsson scored his first points of the season and went on a streak of 9 motos with GP points. Rainio often was the fastest of the three riders in timed practice, but had issues converting this to moto results. He did improve the team's best ever finish to 13th at the GP of Lommel. Both Rainio and Lüning were selected to represent their country in the MXoN.

Lüning aged out for the MX2 class, while Rainio was not retained by the team meaning that for 2025 only Filip Olsson would stay. Spanish rider Samuel Nilsson and Martin Michelis from Estonia would join him. The schedule for the 2025 season would look similar to 2024.

== Riders ==
=== MX2 world championship (2022-2025) ===
- (Denmark) Glen Meier (2022)
- (Czech Republic) Petr Polák (2023)
- (France) Saad Soulimani (2023)
- (Netherlands) Raf Meuwissen (2023)
- (Sweden) Arvid Lüning (2024)
- (Finland) Sampo Rainio (2024)
- (Sweden) Filip Olsson (2024-2025)
- (Estonia) Martin Michelis (2025)
- (Spain) Samuel Nilsson (2025)

=== MXGP world championship (2023) ===
- (Netherlands) Mike Bolink (2023)

=== EMX 250 European championship (2022) ===
- (Estonia) Meico Vettik (2022)
- (Netherlands) Jens Walvoort (2022)

== Complete racing results ==
=== Motocross World Championship ===
| Year | Pos | Nr | Rider | Bike | 1 | 2 | | 3 | | 4 | | 5 | | 6 | | 7 | | 8 | | 9 | | 10 | | 11 | 12 | | 13 | | 14 | | 15 | | 16 | | 17 | 18 | 19 | 20 | Points |
| 2022 | | | | | GBR (United Kingdom) | LOM | | ARG (Argentina) | | POR (Portugal) | | TRE | | LAT (Latvia) | | ITA (Italy) | | SAR (Sardinia) | | ESP (Spain) | | FRA (France) | | GER (Germany) | IDN (Indonesia) | | CZE (Czech Republic) | | FLA (Flanders) | | SWE (Sweden) | | FIN (Finland) | | CHA | TUR (Turkey) | | | |
|---|---|---|---|---|---|---|---|---|---|---|---|---|---|---|---|---|---|---|---|---|---|---|---|---|---|---|---|---|---|---|---|---|---|---|---|---|---|---|---|
| 2022 | 58 | 192 | (Denmark) Glen Meier | KTM | | 20 | 18 | | | | | 24 | 20 | 19 | 28 | | | | | | | Ret | DNS | | | | | | | | | | | | | | | | 7 |
| 2023 | Pos | Nr | Rider | Bike | ARG (Argentina) | SAR (Sardinia) | | SUI (Switzerland) | | TRE | | POR (Portugal) | | ESP (Spain) | | FRA (France) | | LAT (Latvia) | | GER (Germany) | | SUM (West Nusa Tenggara) | | LOM (West Nusa Tenggara) | CZE (Czech Republic) | | FLA (Flanders) | | FIN (Finland) | | SWE (Sweden) | | NED (Netherlands) | | TUR (Turkey) | ITA (Italy) | GBR (United Kingdom) | | |
| 2023 | 38 | 313 | (Czech Republic) Petr Polák | Yamaha | | | | 19 | 18 | Ret | 21 | | | | | 19 | 16 | | | 17 | 16 | | | | 20 | Ret | 27 | 20 | | | | | | | | | | | 23 |
| 2023 | NC | 817 | (Netherlands) Raf Meuwissen | Yamaha | | | | 27 | Ret | DNS | DNS | | | | | | | | | | | | | | | | | | | | | | | | | | | | 0 |
| 2023 | NC | 744 | (France) Saad Soulimani | Yamaha | | | | | | | | | | | | | | | | Ret | Ret | | | | Ret | 22 | 22 | Ret | | | | | | | | | | | 0 |
| 2023 | NC | 822 | (Netherlands) Mike Bolink | Yamaha | | | | | | | | | | | | | | | | | | | | | 31 | 30 | 23 | 23 | | | | | 23 | 26 | | | | | 0 |
| 2024 | Pos | Nr | Rider | Bike | ARG (Argentina) | EUR (Europe) | | SAR (Sardinia) | | TRE | | POR (Portugal) | | ESP (Spain) | | FRA (France) | | GER (Germany) | | LAT (Latvia) | | SUM (West Nusa Tenggara) | | LOM (West Nusa Tenggara) | CZE (Czech Republic) | | FLA (Flanders) | | SWE (Sweden) | | NED (Netherlands) | | SUI (Switzerland) | | TUR (Turkey) | ITA (Italy) | | | |
| 2024 | 39 | 42 | (Finland) Sampo Rainio | KTM | | | | | | Ret | DNS | | | | | 27 | 21 | Ret | 24 | 22 | 21 | | | | 20 | 19 | 13 | 16 | | | 24 | Ret | | | | | | | 16 |
| 2024 | 29 | 338 | (Sweden) Filip Olsson | KTM | | | | | | 22 | Ret | | | | | Ret | 27 | 21 | 23 | 19 | 18 | | | | 17 | 17 | 18 | 15 | 15 | 17 | 20 | Ret | Ret | DNS | | | | | 33 |
| 2024 | 27 | 505 | (Sweden) Arvid Lüning | GasGas | | | | 18 | 14 | 23 | 20 | | | | | 24 | Ret | 18 | 20 | 16 | Ret | | | | 18 | 20 | 15 | 14 | 17 | 16 | 23 | 20 | 21 | 18 | | | | | 50 |

All riders except Mike Bolink raced in the MX2 class

=== EMX250 European Championship ===
| Year | Pos | Rider | Bike | LOM | | POR (Portugal) | | ITA (Italy) | | SAR (Sardinia) | | FRA (France) | GER (Germany) | FLA (Flanders) | | SWE (Sweden) | | FIN (Finland) | | CHA | | Points |
|---|---|---|---|---|---|---|---|---|---|---|---|---|---|---|---|---|---|---|---|---|---|---|
| 2022 | 11 | (Estonia) Meico Vettik | KTM | 10 | 2 | 10 | 5 | Ret | 13 | Ret | Ret | | | 13 | 8 | 15 | 8 | 10 | 10 | | | 130 |
| 2022 | 40 | (Netherlands) Jens Walvoort | KTM | 32 | 20 | 25 | 30 | | | | | | | 18 | 17 | 26 | 24 | 28 | 11 | 26 | 21 | 18 |
