= Road of the Seven Lakes =

Scenic road portion in Argentina

Coordinates: 40.6338°S 71.7050°W

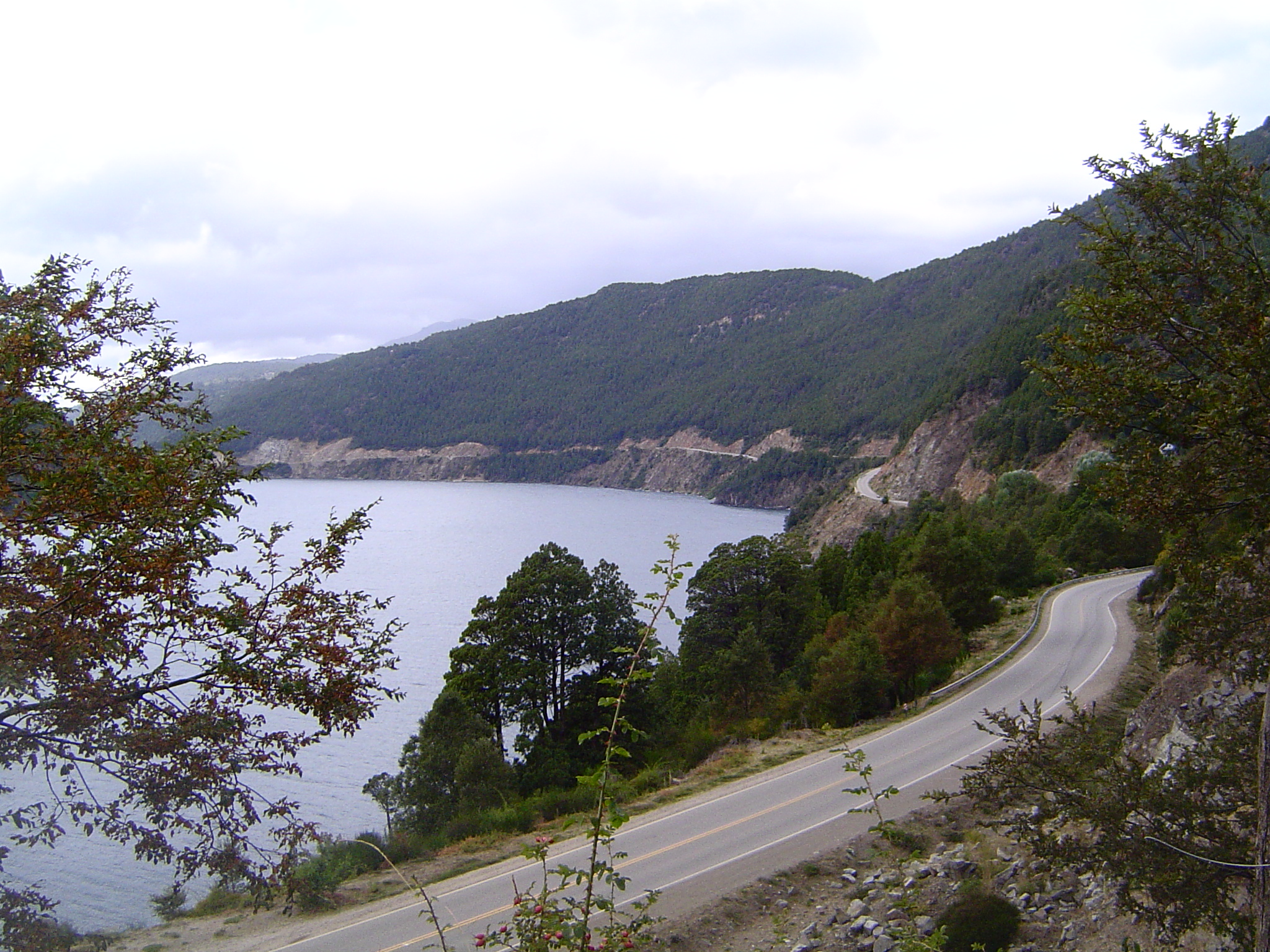
Road of the Seven Lakes

The Road of the Seven Lakes (Spanish: Camino de los Siete Lagos) is the popular name given to the scenic portion of national route 40 between the towns of San Martín de los Andes and Villa La Angostura in the Neuquén Province, in Patagonia Argentina.

The 107 km road that crosses the Lanín and Nahuel Huapi national parks provides access to several lakes in the forest area of the Patagonic Andes, as well as to other sights.

The seven most important lakes on the way of the road after which the route is named are:

- Machónico
- Escondido Lake (southern Neuquén)
- Correntoso
- Espejo
- Lácar
- Falkner
- Villarino

Other lakes accessible through secondary paths include the Meliquina, Hermoso, Traful and Espejo chico lakes.
