= Los Lagos Department =

Coordinates: 40°45′43″S 71°38′35″W

Los Lagos
- Department
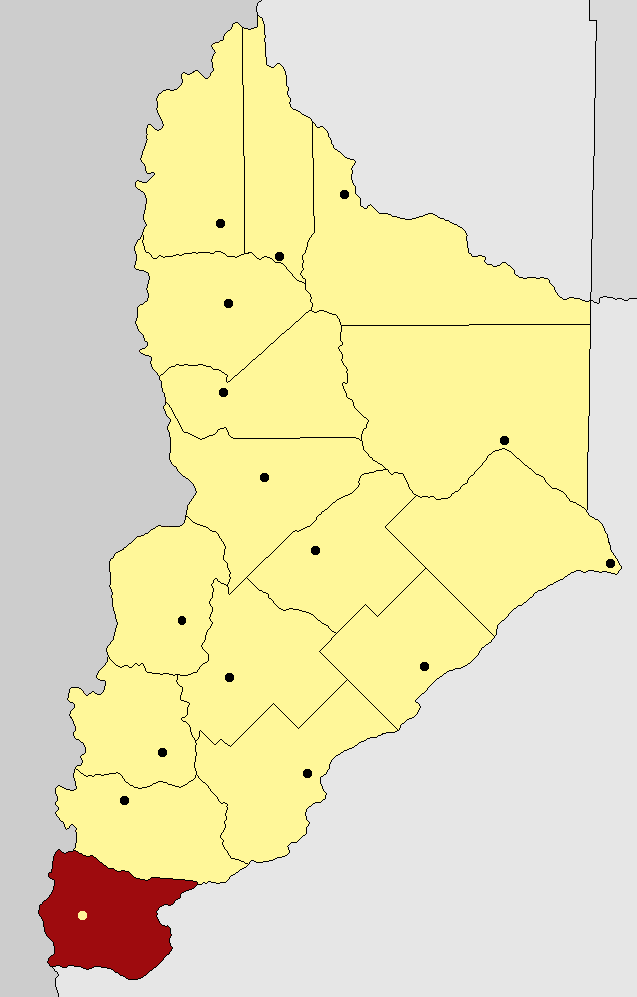
- Country: Argentina
- Province: Neuquén
- Capital: Villa La Angostura

Area
  - Total: 4,230 km^{2} (1,630 sq mi)

Population (2022)
  - Total: 15,555
  - Density: 3.68/km^{2} (9.52/sq mi)
- Important cities: Villa La Angostura: Villa Traful; Huemul; Paso Coihue; Puerto Huemul; Puerto Anchorena; Nahuel Huapi; Ruca Malen; Cuyin Manzano; Villa Llanquin; El Portezuelo; Pichi Traful

Los Lagos is a department located in the south of Neuquén Province, Argentina.

== Geography ==
The Department limits with Lácar Department at north, Rio Negro Province at the east and southeast, with Chile at southwest and east.
