= Villa Traful =

- Hamlet
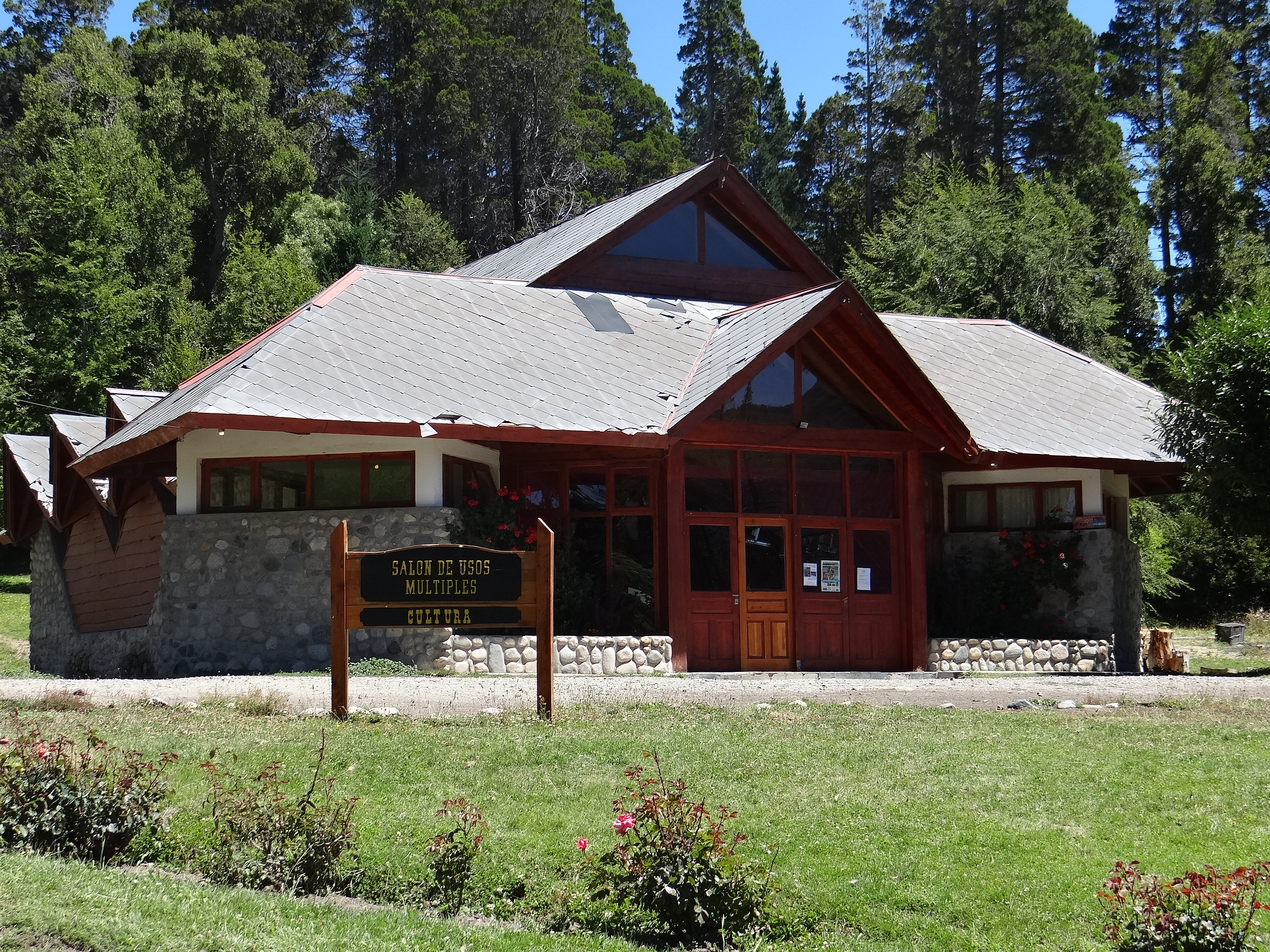

- Location within Neuquén Province Location within Argentina
- Coordinates: 40°40′S 71°24′W
- Country: Argentina
- Province: Neuquen Province
- Elevation: 720 m (2,360 ft)

Population
  - Total: 400
- Demonym: trafulense (Spanish)
- Time zone: UTC−3 (ART)
- Climate: Csb

Villa Traful is a hamlet of the Argentine province of Neuquén located at the shore of the Traful Lake, at 720 metres above mean sea level. It is located inside the Nahuel Huapi National Park on the Road of the Seven lakes, 60 km from Villa La Angostura and 100 km from Bariloche, at 40°40′S 71°24′W. The main access is Provincial Route 65. The town was founded in 1936 by the Argentine National Park Administration (DPN).

It's composed of about 80 houses, built in traditional Alpine-Andine architecture that combines wood with stone, and its population is over 400 inhabitants. The most important part of the economy is based on tourism, especially sport fishing, trekking, horseback riding and mountaineering. Since Villa Traful is inside a National Park, fishing and mountaineering are allowed only with authorisation. Tourism is concentrated generally in summer and spring, while in winter there are almost no tourist.

== Sources ==
- The Magic of living in the Nature - MercoTour.com (Spanish)
- Pictures at VillaTraful.com
- Traful History
- Villa Traful at Patagonia.com.ar (Spanish)

Media related to Villa Traful at Wikimedia Commons
