= Correntoso River =

Coordinates: 40°44′11″S 71°40′28″W

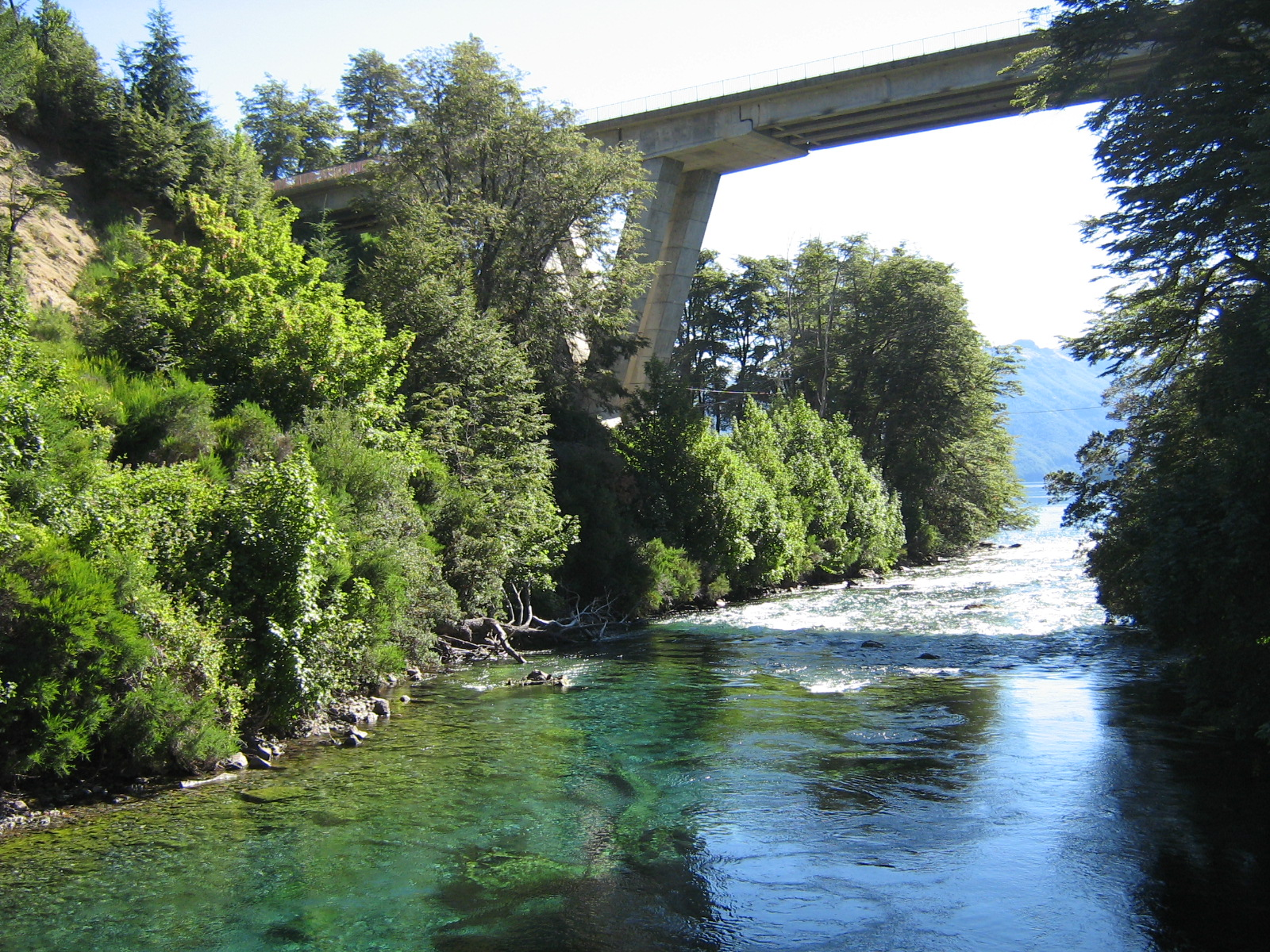
- Correntoso River in Villa La Angostura, Argentina

Location
- Country: Argentina

The Correntoso River is a river located in Villa La Angostura, Argentina. This river runs from Correntoso Lake to Nahuel Huapi Lake, standing out as one of the shortest rivers in the world, with between 200 and 300 m in length (depending on the height of the lakes). This river is famous among the fishing enthusiasts, due to the abundance of large trout, especially at the mouth of Nahuel Huapi Lake.

== See also ==
- List of rivers of Argentina
