= Traful River =

Coordinates: 40.7139°S 71.1332°W

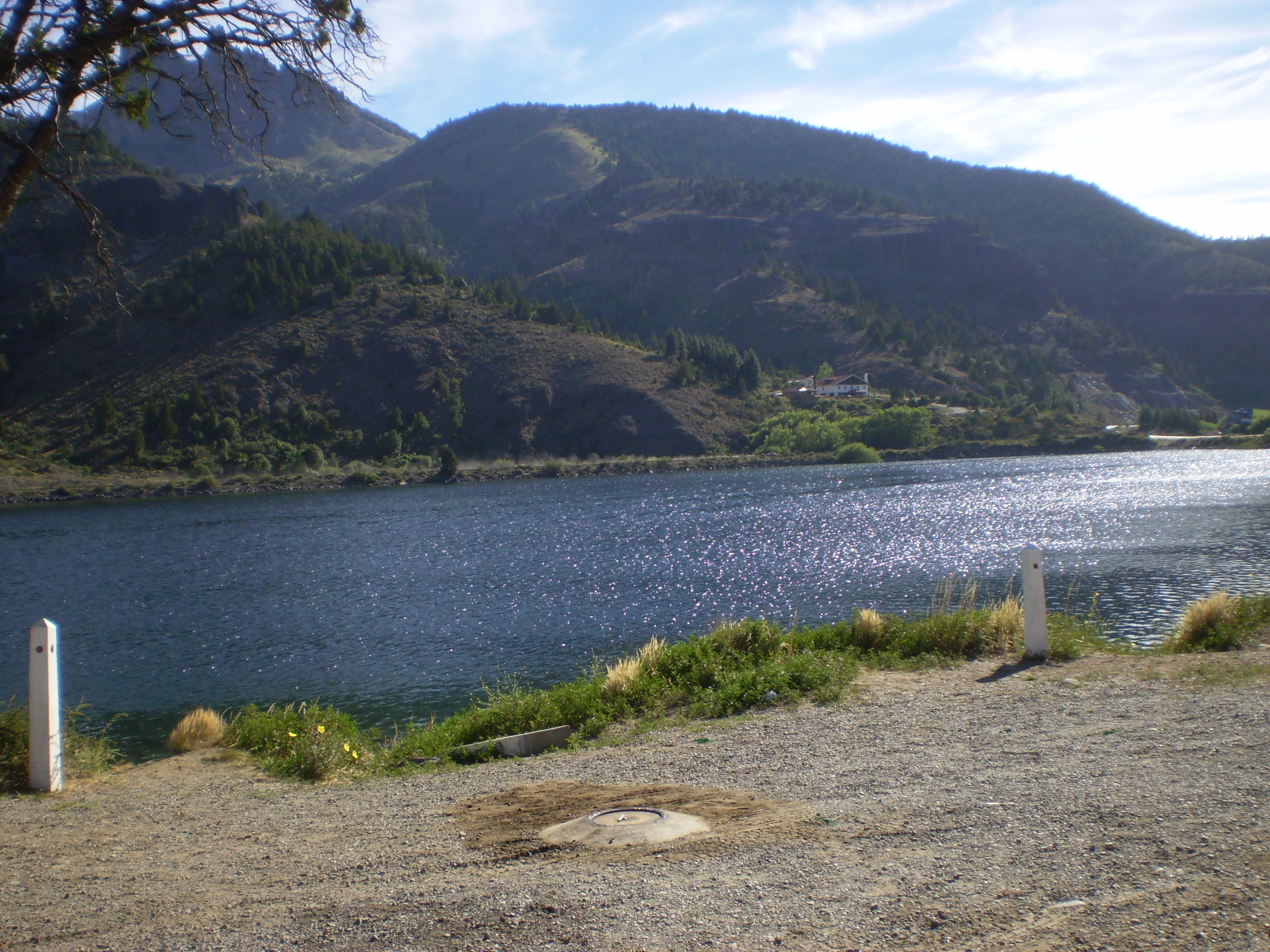

Location
- Country: Argentina

The Traful River is a river in Argentina. It flows from Traful Lake to Limay River.

== See also ==
- List of rivers of Argentina
