= UD Arroyomolinos =

Arroyomolinos
- Full name: Unión Deportiva Arroyomolinos
- Founded: 1993
- Dissolved: 2021
- Ground: La Dehesa; Arroyomolinos, Community of Madrid, Spain
- Capacity: 3,000
- Chairman: (Spain) Emilio Díaz
- Manager: (Spain) Mario Martín
- 2020–21: Primera de Aficionados – Group 4, 20th of 20
- Website: http://www.udarroyomolinos.es
Home colours	Away colours

Unión Deportiva Arroyomolinos was a Spanish football club based in Arroyomolinos, in the Community of Madrid. Founded in 1993 and dissolved in 2021, it last played in Primera de Aficionados – Group 4; its stadium is Estadio La Dehesa.

== Season to season ==
Season	Tier	Division	Place	Copa del Rey
1992–93	8	3ª Reg.	2nd	
1993–94	7	2ª Reg.	1st	
1994–95	6	1ª Reg.	6th	
1995–96	6	1ª Reg.	15th	
1996–97	6	1ª Reg.	7th	
1997–98	6	1ª Reg.	15th	
1998–99	7	2ª Reg.	1st	
1999–2000	6	1ª Reg.	9th	
2000–01	6	1ª Reg.	8th	
2001–02	6	1ª Reg.	18th	
2002–03	7	1ª Reg.	11th	
2003–04	7	2ª Reg.	1st	
2004–05	6	1ª Reg.	1st	
2005–06	5	Reg. Pref.	6th	
2006–07	5	Reg. Pref.	9th	

Season	Tier	Division	Place	Copa del Rey
2007–08	5	Reg. Pref.	3rd	
2008–09	5	Reg. Pref.	6th	
2009–10	5	Pref.	9th	
2010–11	5	Pref.	10th	
2011–12	5	Pref.	7th	
2012–13	5	Pref.	10th	
2013–14	5	Pref.	16th	
2014–15	6	1ª Afic.	16th	
2015–16	7	2ª Afic.	2nd	
2016–17	6	1ª Afic.	7th	
2017–18	6	1ª Afic.	7th	
2018–19	6	1ª Afic.	9th	
2019–20	6	1ª Afic.	13th	
2020–21	6	1ª Afic.	20th	
