= Traful Lake =

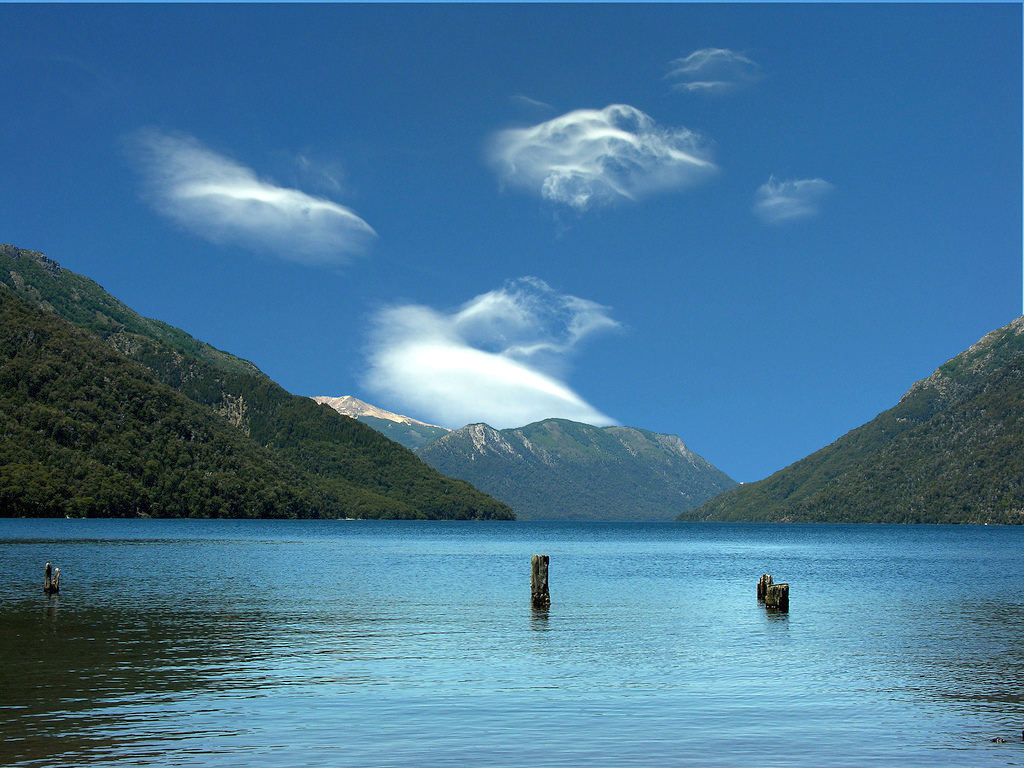

- Location within Neuquén Province
- Location: Los Lagos Department, Neuquén Province
- Coordinates: 40°38′05″S 71°25′36″W
- Type: Freshwater lake
- Primary inflows: Pichi Traful river and the Machico, Cataratas and Coaco arroyos
- Primary outflows: Traful River(25 km) (Traful → Limay → Negro → Atlantic)
- Basin countries: Argentina
- Max. length: 23.5 km (14.6 mi)
- Max. width: 3.52 km (2.19 mi)
- Surface area: 71.5 km^{2} (27.6 sq mi)
- Average depth: 173 m (568 ft)
- Max. depth: 339 m (1,112 ft)
- Water volume: 12.37 km^{3} (2.97 cu mi)
- Surface elevation: 720 m (2,360 ft)
- Settlements: Villa Traful

Traful Lake is a lake in the Los Lagos Department of the Argentine province of Neuquén with an area of 71,5 km^{2}. The lake is the starting point of the Traful River that empties into the Limay River. It is contained inside Nahuel Huapi National Park.

This lake is famous for a scenic view from a 102-meter-high glacier cliff which offers a complete view of the lake and the entire valley. On the lake's shore lies the mountain town of Villa Traful, the main settlement in the lake area. It has campgrounds, a gas station, and hotels.

The waters of the lake are very transparent and well oxygenated. The irregular coasts of the lake have cliffs and beaches. Fishing is possible both from boats and from the shore. The north shore has good fishing for landlocked salmon, rainbow trout, brook trout, and brown trout.

== Northern arm, “Pichi Traful” ==
The lake has a long, thin northern arm, known as Lake Pichi Traful. It extends to the northwest of the main body of the lake, accessible by the lake road or by highways RP 65 and RP 234. Upon arrival, there is a park guard station, which provides information about places to spend the night or camp. This branch of the lake is fed by the Pichi Traful river, which contributes oxygenated water. It's an excellent place for fly-fishing. At its mouth, there are beaches for camping.

== Submerged forest ==
The lake contains a dead forest of some 60 cypress trees, which stand in some 15 meters of water. Previously they stood on a nearby hill, but a landslide, probably in the 1960s, plunged them into the lake, where they still stand today. Due to the water's great transparency, their roots are visible from the surface when it is calm.
