= Villa Llanquín =

Coordinates: 40°53′44″S 71°02′12″W

- Municipality and village
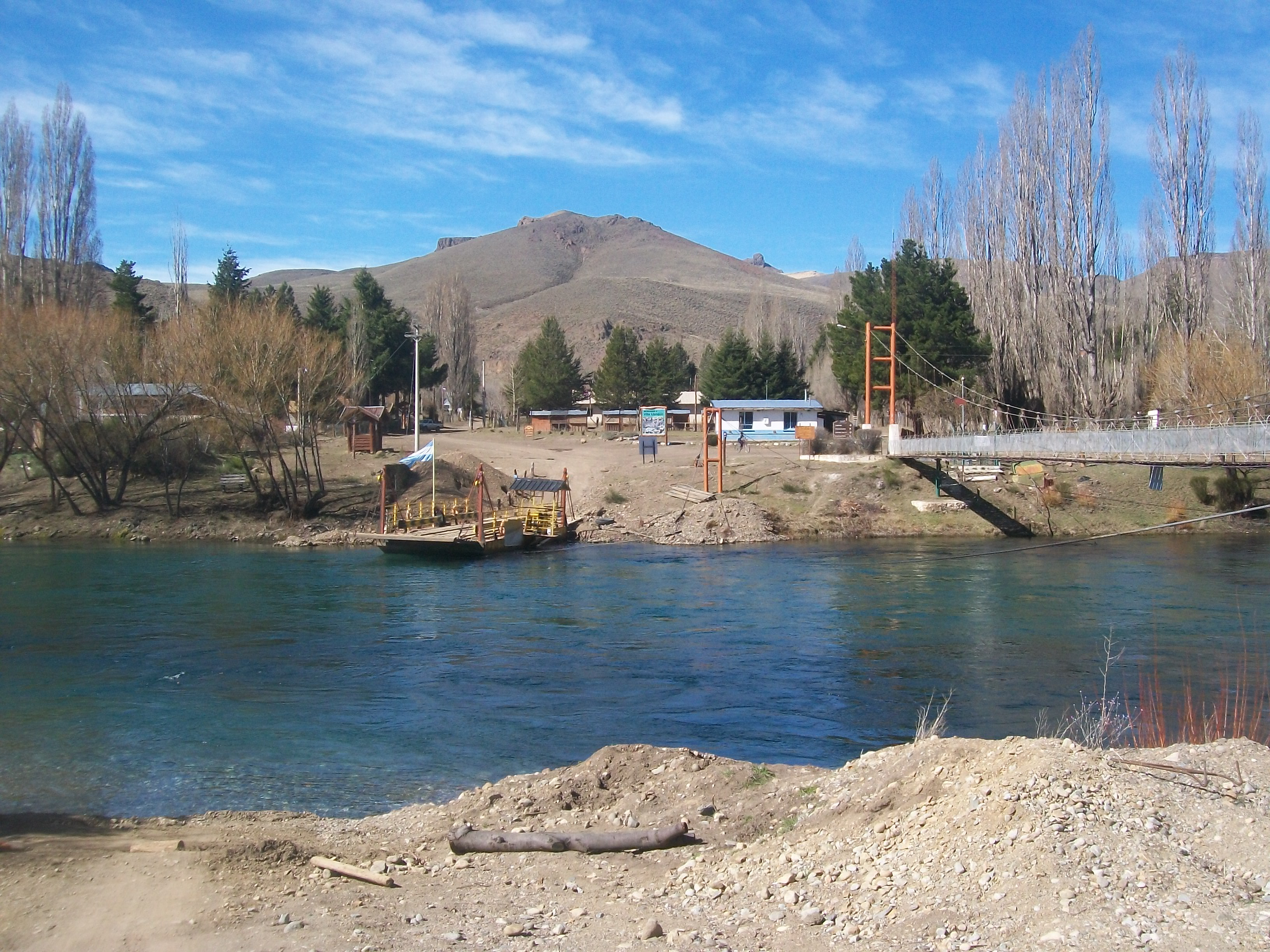
- View of the hanging walkway over the Limay river and the raft for vehicle crossing in Villa Llanquín
- Interactive map of Villa Llanquín
- Country: Argentina
- Province: Río Negro Province
- Time zone: UTC−3 (ART)

Villa Llanquín is a village and municipality in Río Negro Province in Argentina.
