= Cuyín Manzano =

Village in Neuquén Province, Argentina

- Municipality and village
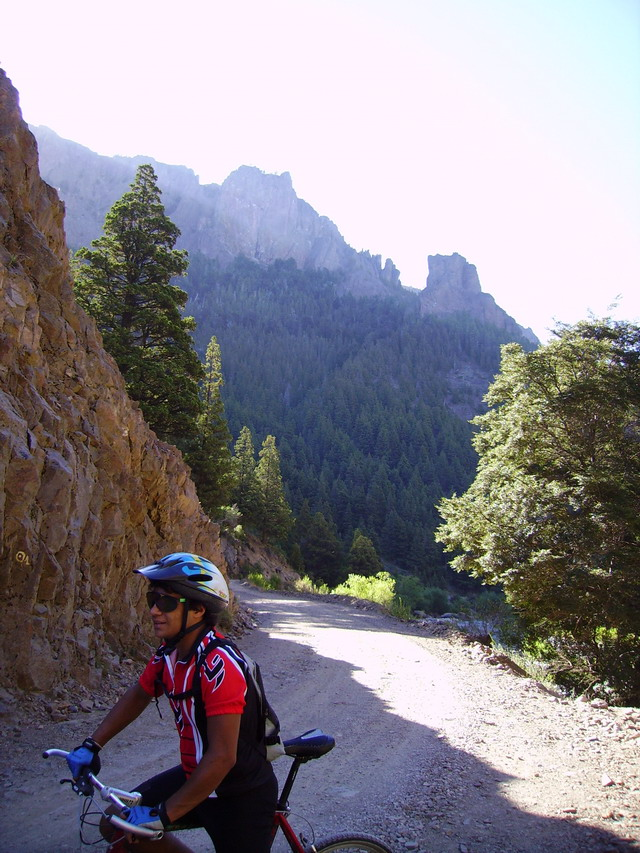
- Section of Cuyin Manzano village

- Location within Neuquén Province Location within Argentina
- Coordinates: 40°46′S 71°11′W
- Country: Argentina
- Province: Neuquén Province
- Time zone: UTC−3 (ART)

Cuyín Manzano is a village and municipality in Neuquén Province in southwestern Argentina.
