= Arroyomolinos, Madrid =

Coordinates: 40°16′N 3°54′W

Arroyomolinos
- Municipality
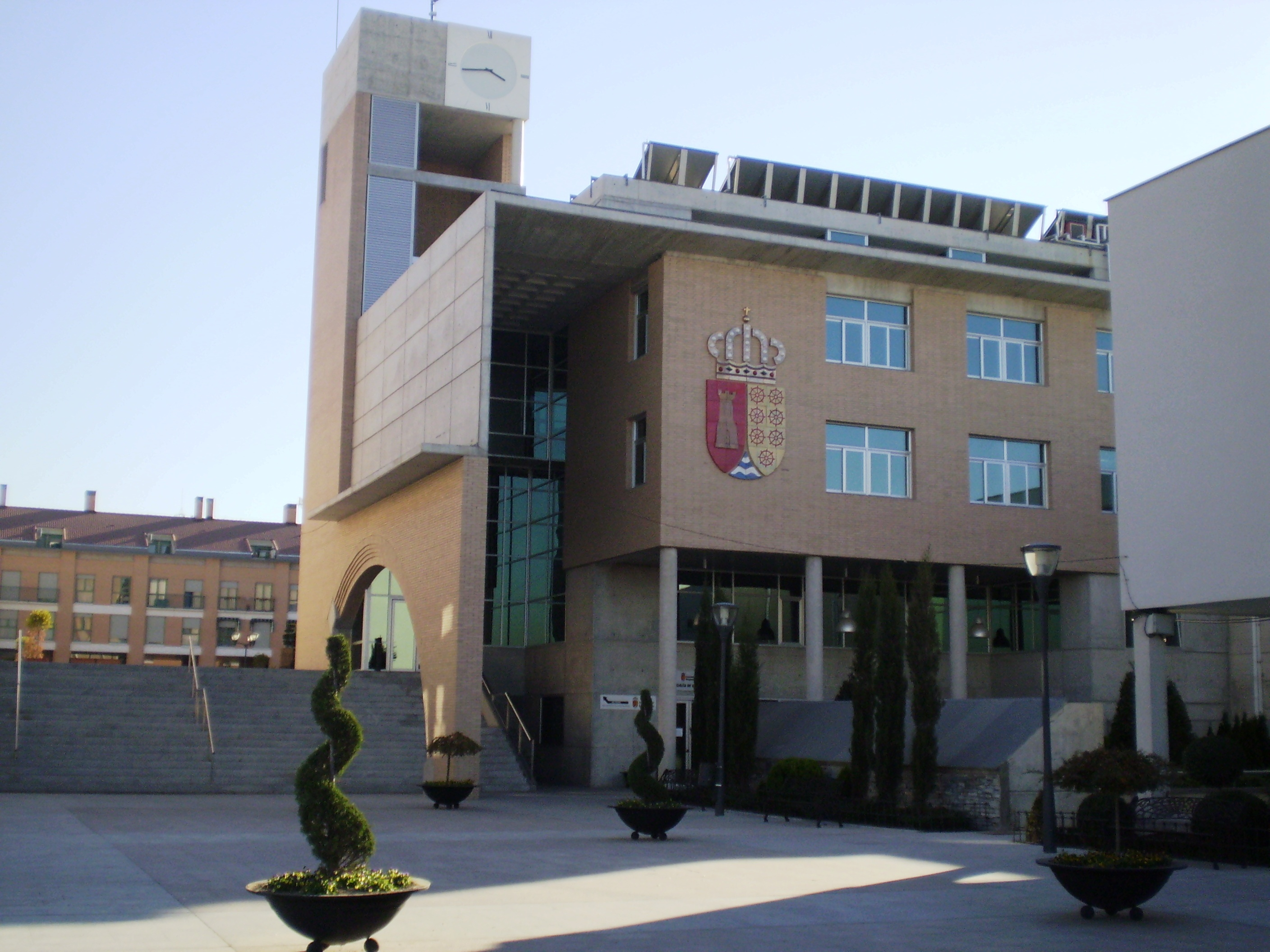

- Flag Coat of arms

- Municipal location within the Community of Madrid.
- Country: Spain
- Autonomous community: Community of Madrid

Area
  - Total: 7.98 sq mi (20.66 km^{2})

Population (2025-01-01)
  - Total: 38,075
  - Density: 4,773/sq mi (1,843/km^{2})
- Time zone: UTC+1 (CET)
  - Summer (DST): UTC+2 (CEST)

Arroyomolinos (Spanish pronunciation: [ˈaroʝomoˈlinos]) is a municipality of the autonomous community of Madrid in central Spain. As of 2022, it had a population of 34,833.

== Demographics ==
Historical population

Year	Pop.	±%
1842	82	—
1857	162	+97.6%
1877	155	−4.3%
1887	128	−17.4%
1900	150	+17.2%
1910	139	−7.3%
1920	135	−2.9%
1930	167	+23.7%
1940	135	−19.2%

Year	Pop.	±%
1950	170	+25.9%
1960	219	+28.8%
1970	231	+5.5%
1981	211	−8.7%
1991	1,236	+485.8%
2001	5,541	+348.3%
2011	22,135	+299.5%
2021	33,757	+52.5%

Source: National Statistics Institute

== See also ==
- UD Arroyomolinos
