= Villa La Angostura =

- Town
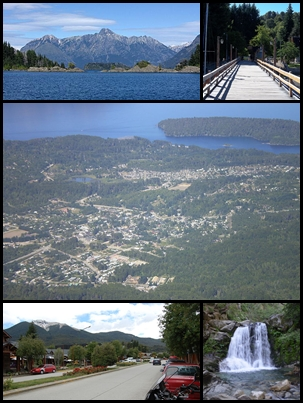
- Nickname: Jardín de la Patagonia
- Location within Neuquén Province Location within Argentina
- Coordinates: 40°45′44.9″S 71°38′46.7″W
- Country: Argentina
- Province: Neuquén
- Department: Los Lagos
- Established: 15 May 1932

Government
  - Intendant: Fabio Stefani

Area
  - Total: 79.6 km^{2} (30.7 sq mi)
- Elevation: 870 m (2,850 ft)

Population (2010 census [INDEC])
  - Total: 11,063
  - Density: 139/km^{2} (360/sq mi)
- Time zone: UTC−3 (ART)
- CPA base: Q8407
- Dialing code: +54 02944
- Climate: Cfb
- Website: villalaangostura.gov.ar

Villa La Angostura (Spanish for Town of the Narrowing) is a town located in the Los Lagos Department in the south of the Argentine province of Neuquén, on the northwest shore of the Nahuel Huapi Lake.

Nestled in the northern part of the Nahuel Huapi National Park, and surrounded by lakes, forests and mountains, it is considered to be one of the most beautiful locations in the mountainous parts of Patagonia; earning it the nickname Garden of Patagonia (Spanish: Jardín de la Patagonia).

Just located a couple of kilometers away from the border with Chile through the Cardenal Antonio Samoré Pass and with other nearby places such as Bariloche and San Martín de los Andes, it forms a popular tourist corridor during both summer and winter.

== Geography ==
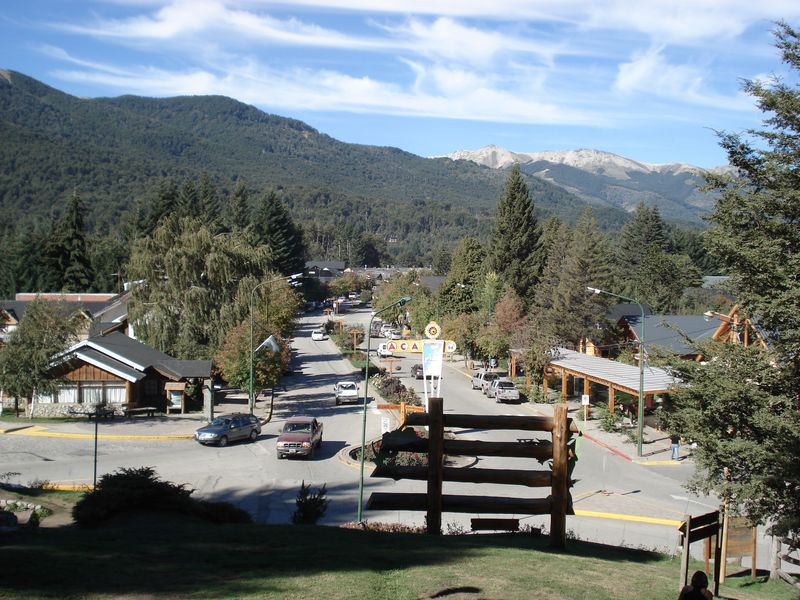
View of the center of Villa La Angostura.

The town is located halfway between the cities of San Martín de los Andes and Bariloche, inside the Nahuel Huapi National Park, very close to the isthmus of the Quetrihue Peninsula, where the Los Arrayanes National Park and its arrayanes (Luma apiculata) forest is located. The town is located nearby Cardenal Antonio Samoré Pass that links it with Osorno in Chile.

The elevation of the city centre is about 790 m (2,590 ft), and the lake is at 765 m (2,510 ft). Surrounding mountains range from 1,500 m (4,900 ft) to about 2,000 m (6,600 ft) (Cerro Bayo, right behind the city, is 1,782 m (5,846 ft) high).

=== Climate ===
The area's climate is with marked alpine characteristics despite relatively low altitudes. Summers are known for being sunny and pleasant, with high temperatures usually between 18 and 25 °C (64 and 77 °F), but with cold nights between 2 and 9 °C (36 and 48 °F). Temperatures will reach 30 °C (86 °F) only a couple of times every year, and night frost happens occasionally during the summer as well. There are often long stretches of sunny, windy weather; however, when the weather gets locked in a stormy pattern, it can remain so for several days or weeks: temperatures will stay cold (10 °C to 18 °C, or 50 °F to 65 °F) and summer sleet is not unprecedented. Rainfall in the summer averages 70 to 85 mm (2.8 to 3.3 in) per month, with a very high variability from one year to another. March brings more frequent frost, but also nice stretches of sunny weather. The average high temperature is 19 °C, the low is 4 °C, occasionally 30 °C can be reached, and temperatures may fall to -5 °C. The most radical change occurs sometime during the month of April, when Villa La Angostura first gets in the path of a "train of Pacific storms": in the end, total precipitation for the month averages 168 mm (6.6 in). The average high is 14 °C (57 °F), the low is 2 °C or 35 °F(the nighttime change is small due to increased cloudiness) and by late April any cloudless night will be frosty. May is known for being extremely rainy, with an average amount of 434 mm (17.1 in) (including sleet and snow). It is also often the month of the first significant snowfall. High temperatures are usually around 9 °C (48 °F), lows average 1 °C (34 °F), sometimes temperatures can reach −10 °C (14 °F). June, July and August are the core of the winter in Villa La Angostura, when the average high ranges from 5 to 8 °C (41 to 46 °F) and lows from 0 to −2 °C (32 to 28 °F). Storms are very frequent and usually bring a mixture of rain, snow and sleet; overall precipitation averages 200 to 300 mm (7.9 to 11.8 in) monthly for the period, falling mostly as snow in the mountains around the city. Snowstorms can sometimes be heavy (over 20 cm or 8 inches), and extreme cold waves might bring temperatures down to −18 °C (0 °F) or lower; however, long stretches of intense frost are rare as Pacific storms always strike the area with milder, moist air. In September, the storminess diminishes slightly (172 mm (6.8 in) in total), and high temperatures reach an average of 11 °C, although low temperatures only increase to -1 °C. By the end of the month, there might be stretches of pleasant weather and comfortable temperatures, but the month also marks the beginning of the windiest part of the year. October is extremely variable, going back and forth between periods of extremely windy, but sunny weather, and freak cold snaps that bring night temperatures below −5 °C (23 °F) and mixtures of sleet and snow. Average highs are 14 °C (57 °F), lows are 1 °C (34 °F), and precipitation reaches 121 mm (4.8 in). November brings springlike weather, much lower precipitation (83 mm (3.3 in)) but strong winds and wild variations in temperature. Averages are 17 °C in the afternoon and 3 °C at night, but it is not unusual to have a day of rain and sleet with a high below 5 °C (41 °F), or a day with sunny weather and a high of 25 °C (77 °F). Finally, December is a transition between spring and summer: winds are still very strong and freak variations occur, but the average high of 20 °C (68 °F) and the low of 5 °C (41 °F) are more typical of summer weather. Storminess might be a bit higher as in November, with an average of 90 mm (3.5 in) of rain. On the whole, Villa La Angostura's climate is noted for being among the rainiest in Argentina (with 2,074 mm (81.7 in) of rain over almost 300 days a year), for having no frost-free periods whatsoever, and for its clear, dry and extremely pleasant summer days. Areas west of the city are much rainier, with over 3,000 mm (120 in) over Brazo Rincon.

Nearby La Angostura is the Cerro Bayo and its ski centre. The resort's base, at only 250 m (820 ft) higher than the city, usually only sees sufficient snow cover for a few weeks in midwinter, following large storms. However, slopes above the altitude of 1,200 m (3,900 ft) offer reliable snow cover, and most of the skiing takes place between 1,500 and 1,780 m (4,920 and 5,840 ft), where pockets of snow might be found till midsummer. The view from the top is impressive, especially toward the west, across Nahuel Huapi lake, with the majestic, heavily glaciated Cerro Tronador (3,450 m (11,320 ft)), clearly visible.

Climate data for Villa La Angostura (1993–2004)
| Month | Jan | Feb | Mar | Apr | May | Jun | Jul | Aug | Sep | Oct | Nov | Dec | Year |
|---|---|---|---|---|---|---|---|---|---|---|---|---|---|
| Mean daily maximum °C (°F) | 23.2 (73.8) | 23.2 (73.8) | 19.6 (67.3) | 14.5 (58.1) | 10.6 (51.1) | 7.4 (45.3) | 7.5 (45.5) | 9.1 (48.4) | 11.6 (52.9) | 15.6 (60.1) | 17.2 (63.0) | 21.4 (70.5) | 15.2 (59.4) |
| Daily mean °C (°F) | 14.7 (58.5) | 14.2 (57.6) | 11.8 (53.2) | 8.3 (46.9) | 5.8 (42.4) | 3.8 (38.8) | 3.1 (37.6) | 4.7 (40.5) | 5.7 (42.3) | 8.6 (47.5) | 10.3 (50.5) | 13.6 (56.5) | 8.9 (48.0) |
| Mean daily minimum °C (°F) | 6.1 (43.0) | 5.2 (41.4) | 3.9 (39.0) | 2.2 (36.0) | 1.2 (34.2) | 0.3 (32.5) | −1.0 (30.2) | 0.4 (32.7) | −0.1 (31.8) | 1.5 (34.7) | 3.3 (37.9) | 5.6 (42.1) | 2.5 (36.5) |
| Record low °C (°F) | −2.5 (27.5) | −4.5 (23.9) | −5.0 (23.0) | −9.0 (15.8) | −8.1 (17.4) | −9.0 (15.8) | −10.5 (13.1) | −10.2 (13.6) | −8.9 (16.0) | −4.5 (23.9) | −4.0 (24.8) | −2.0 (28.4) | −10.5 (13.1) |
| Average precipitation mm (inches) | 63.7 (2.51) | 44.5 (1.75) | 77.8 (3.06) | 141.3 (5.56) | 207.8 (8.18) | 362.4 (14.27) | 249.6 (9.83) | 226.3 (8.91) | 144.3 (5.68) | 139.8 (5.50) | 123.1 (4.85) | 67.7 (2.67) | 1,848.2 (72.76) |
Source: Instituto Nacional de Tecnología Agropecuaria

== Tourism ==
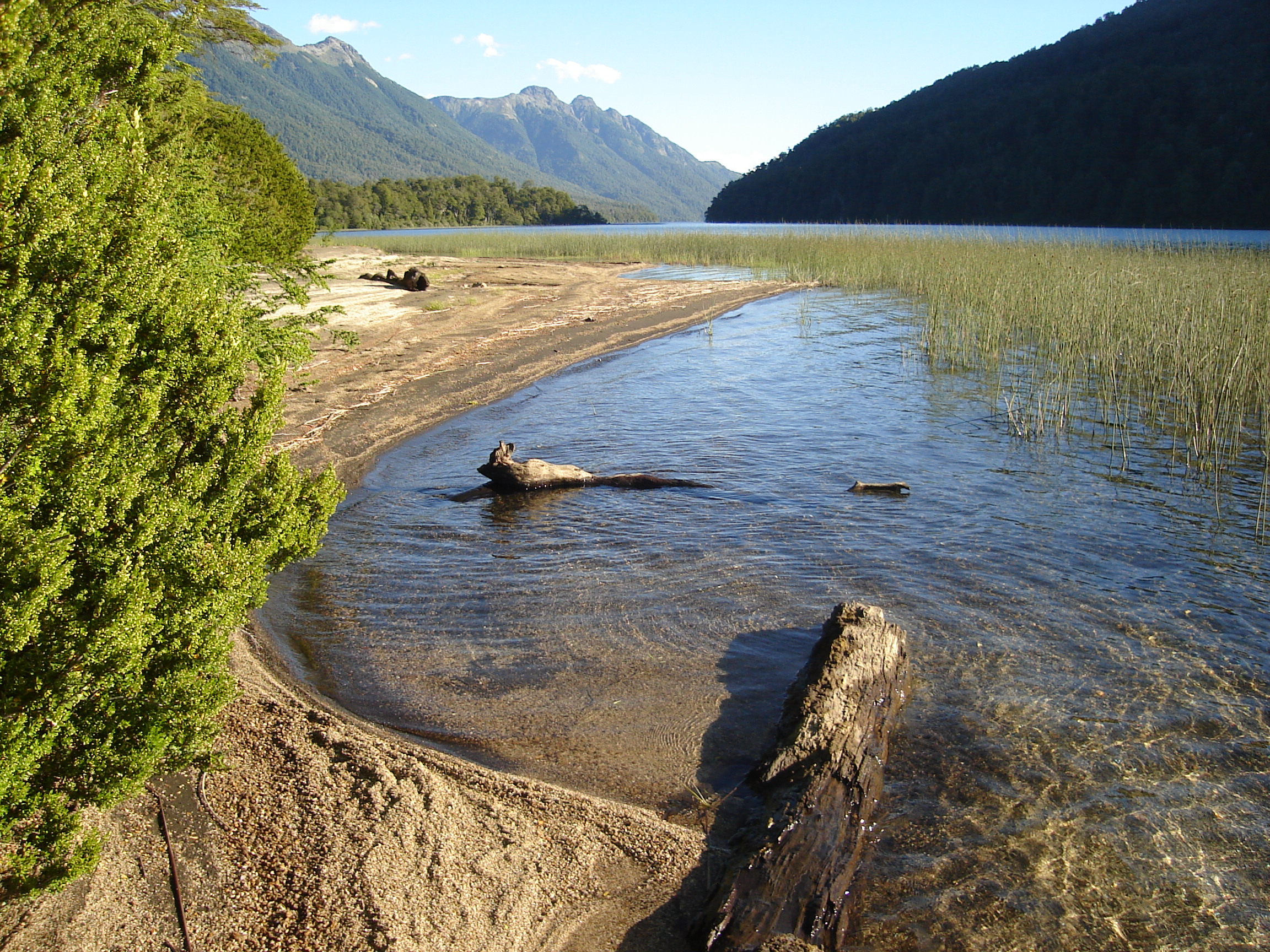
Lago Correntoso

La Angostura is considered among the main attractions of Argentina's Andean Patagonia not only because of the wooden town itself, but also because of the beauty of its sights. On its west side is the Nahuel Huapi Lake, and to the east, the Correntoso Lake. Both lakes are connected by the Correntoso River, which, with 200 meters of length, is one of the sport fishing destinations around La Angostura.

The architecture of the town follows a stylized Alpine wooden style similar to that of Bariloche's city centre. There are shops and restaurants of artisanal products such as chocolate, beer and trout. It is categorised as a mountain village, even though it has approximately 11,000 inhabitants.

== 2011 volcanic ash ==
In June 2011, Villa La Angostura was declared a disaster area due to the massive layer of ash dumped on the community by the eruption to the west in Chile.
