= Mascardi =

Mascardi is an Italian surname. Notable people with the surname include:

== People ==
- Agostino Mascardi (1590-1640), Italian rhetorician, historian and poet
- Diego Mascardi (born 2006), Italian footballer
- Evangelina Mascardi (born 1977), Argentine lutenist, guitarist, and theorbist
- Giovanni Mascardi (died 1646), Roman Catholic prelate
- Nicolás Mascardi (1625-1673), Ligurian Jesuit priest and missionar

== Places ==
- Mascardi Lake, lake region of northern Patagonia in Río Negro Province, Argentina
- Villa Mascardi, village in Río Negro Province in Argentina

== See also ==
- Huelmo–Mascardi Cold Reversal, cooling event in South America between 11,400 and 10,200 14C years BP
