= Bariloche =

Bariloche San Carlos de Bariloche (Spanish)
- City and municipality
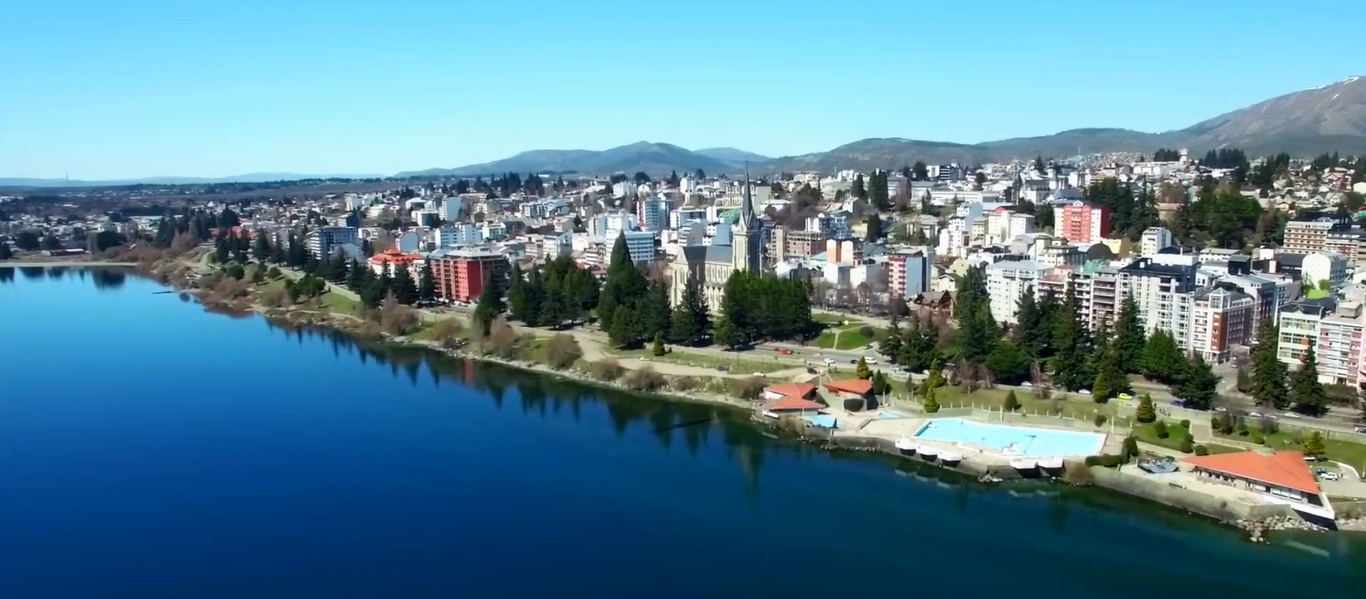
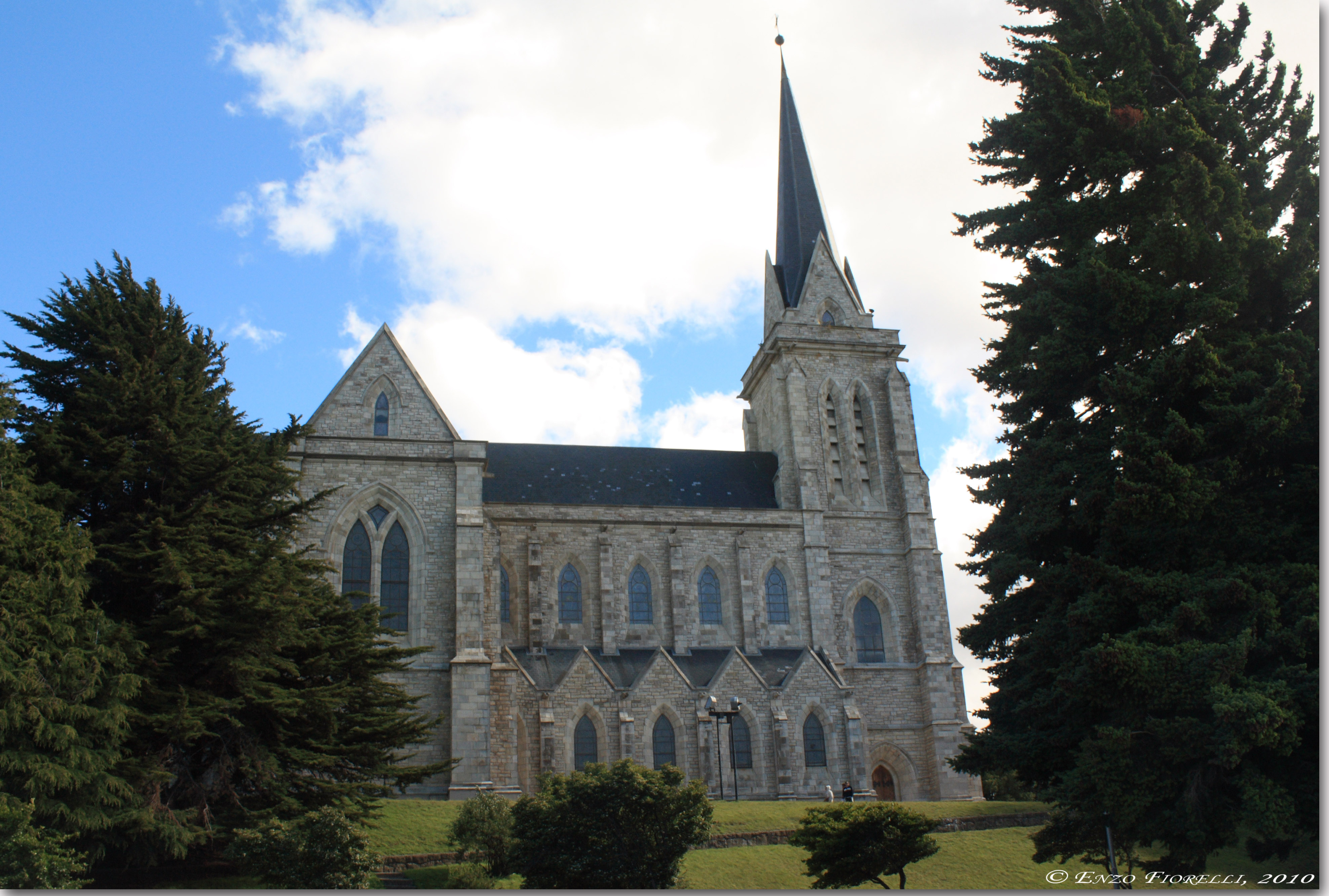
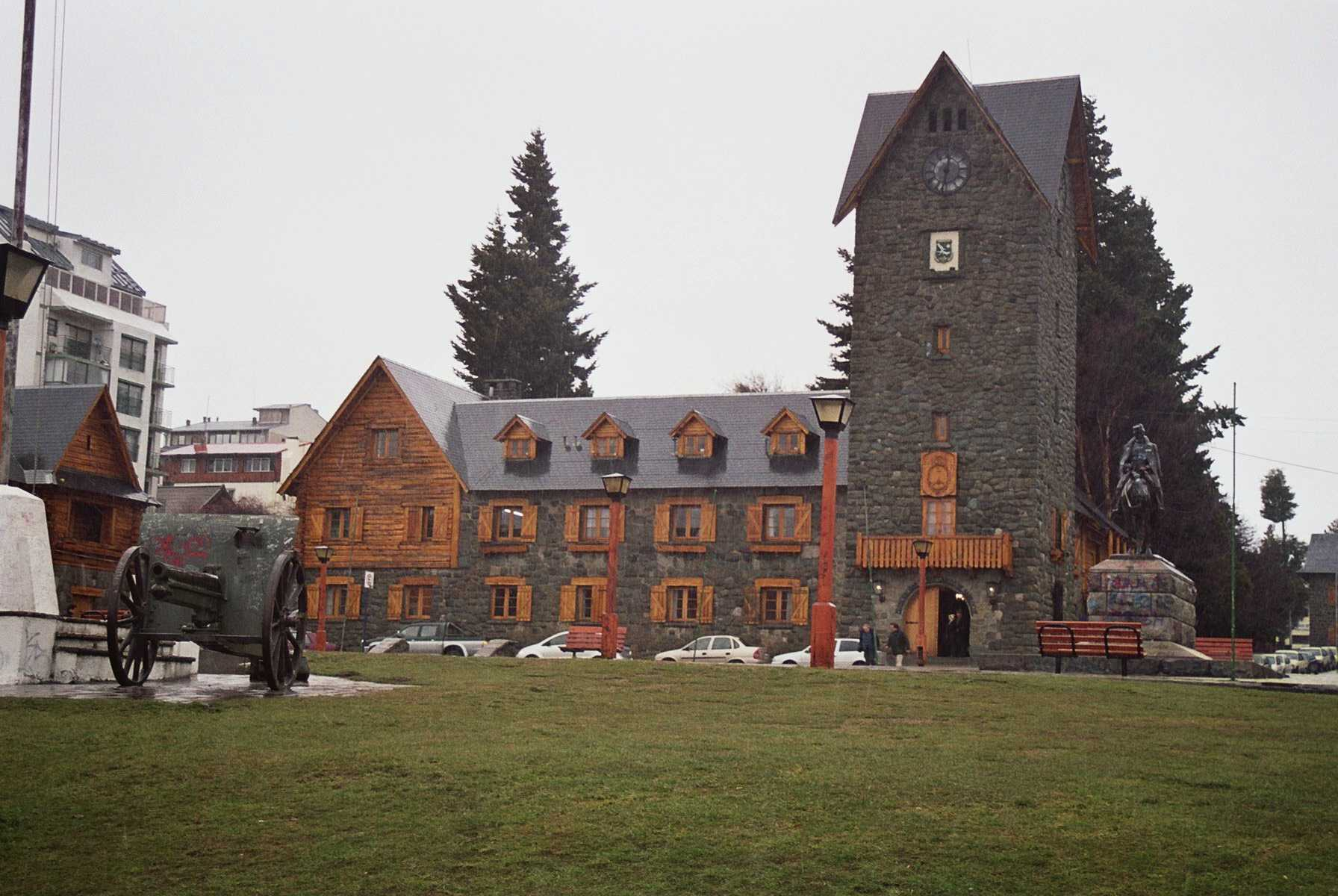
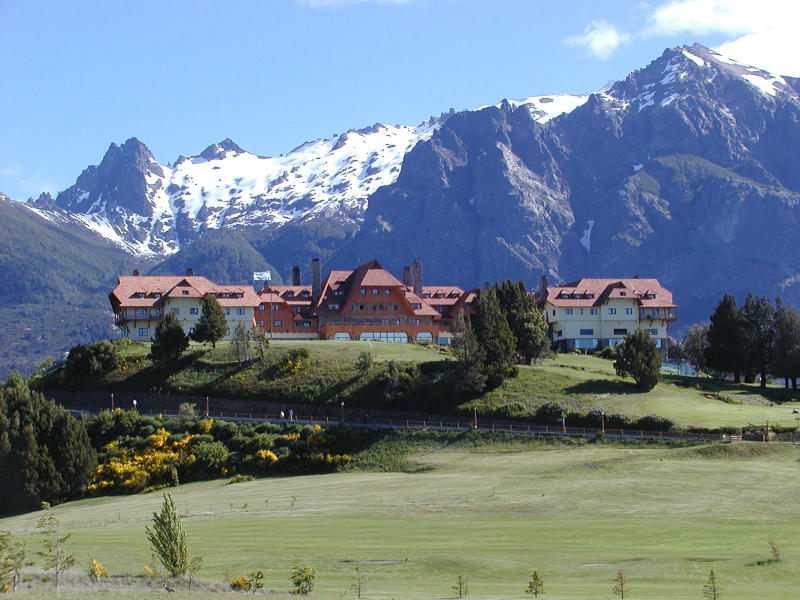
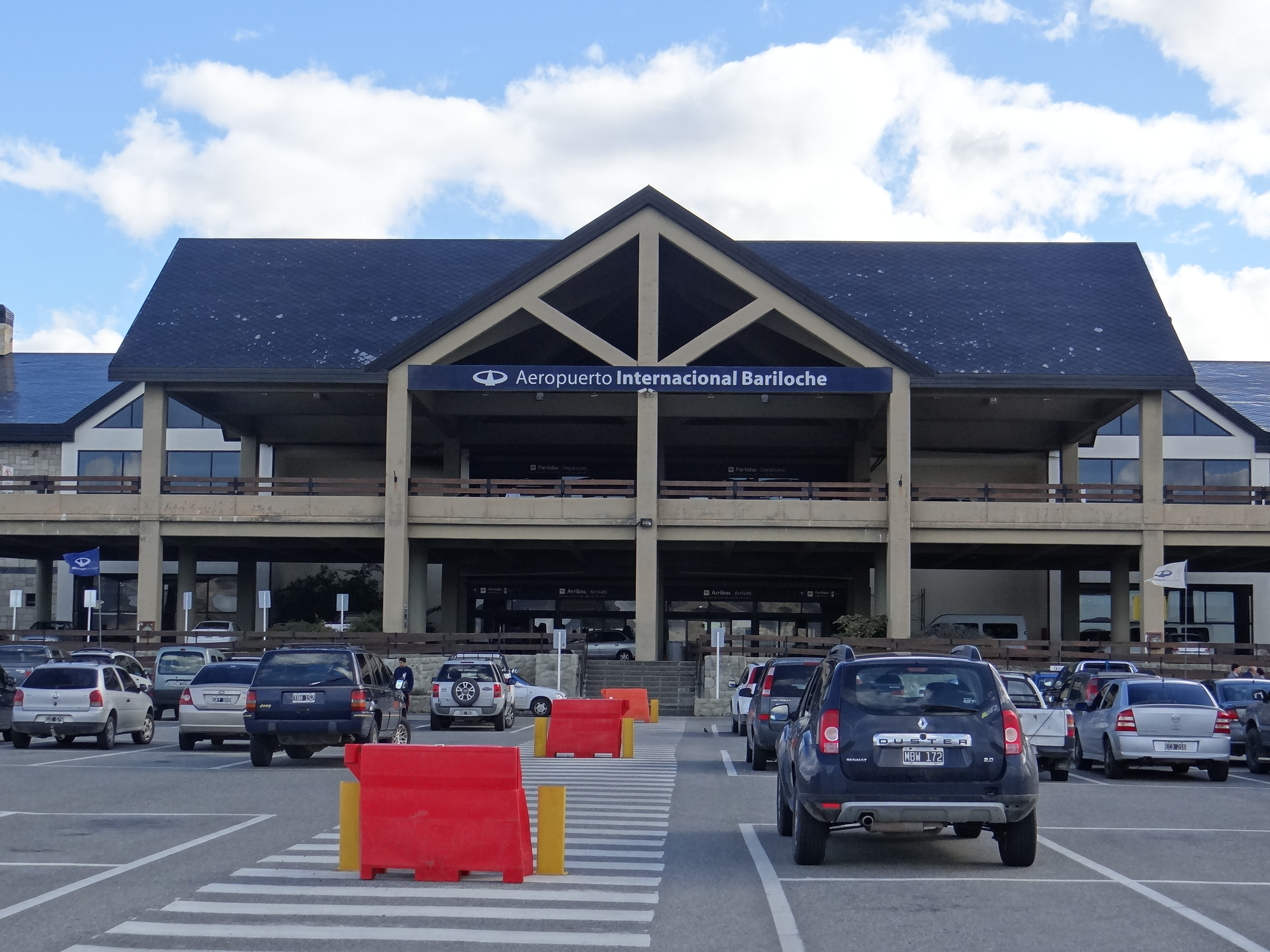
- Skyline of Bariloche from Nahuel Huapi Lake Cathedral of Our Lady of Nahuel Huapi Civic Center Llao Llao Hotel San Carlos de Bariloche Airport

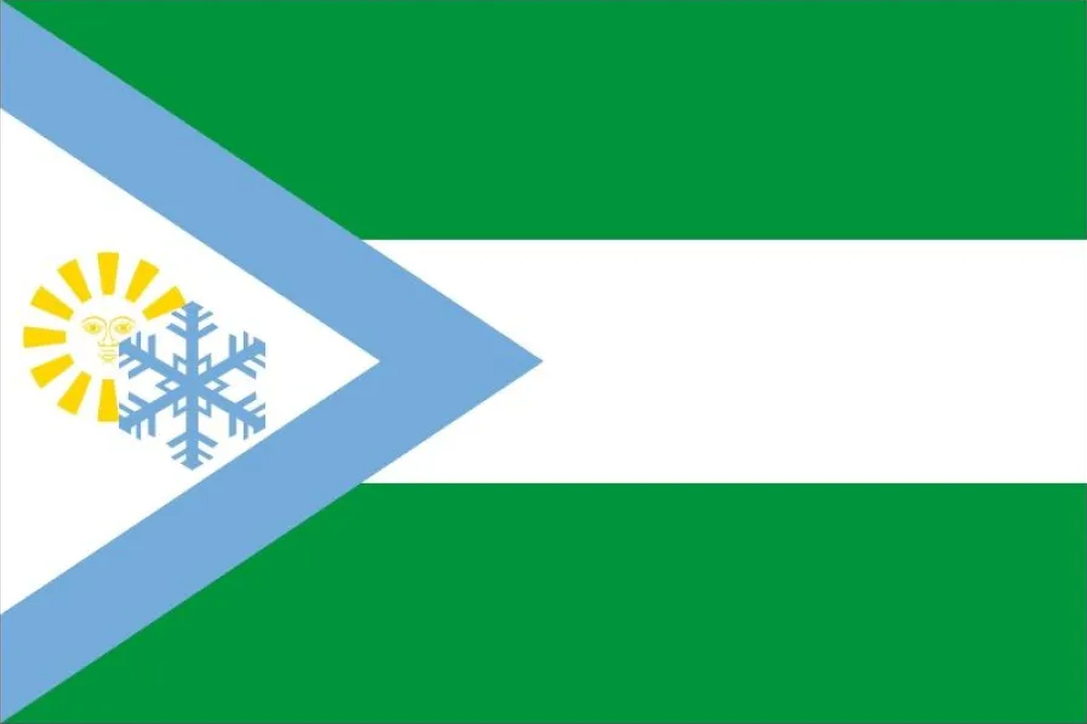
- Flag Coat of arms
- Nickname: The Queen of Patagonia
- Location within Río Negro Province Location within Argentina Location within South America
- Coordinates: 41°09′S 71°18′W
- Country: Argentina
- Province: Río Negro
- Department: Bariloche
- Established: 3 May 1902; 124 years ago (as Nahuel Huapi Agricultural Colony)

Government
  - Intendant: Walter Cortés

Area
  - City and municipality: 220.27 km^{2} (85.05 sq mi)
- Elevation: 893 m (2,930 ft)

Population (2022 census)
  - Metro: 135,755
- Time zone: UTC−3 (ART)
- Climate: Csb
- Website: bariloche.gov.ar

San Carlos de Bariloche (from the Mapuche name Vuriloche, meaning "people from the other side of the mountain"), commonly known simply as Bariloche (Spanish pronunciation: [baɾiˈlotʃe]), is the largest city in the Argentine province of Río Negro and the seat of the department of the same name. It is located in the foothills of the Patagonian Andes on the southern shore of Nahuel Huapi Lake, near the border with Chile. With a population of 135,755 according to the 2022 census, Bariloche is a mid-sized city by national standards but holds significant regional importance. It is not only the most populous city in its province but also the largest in the Patagonian Andes, and the third largest in the entire Argentine Patagonia, following Neuquén and Comodoro Rivadavia. Its urban zone is characterized by its low density and has an area of more than 220 square kilometres (85 sq mi), extending longitudinally from east to west for about 50 kilometres (31 mi).

Bariloche's economy is strongly based on tourism; it is the country's third most visited destination after Buenos Aires and Mar del Plata. It is the most popular city in all of Patagonia. It attracts visitors year-round for its scenic natural setting including Nahuel Huapi National Park and other reserves, offering a range of activities such as skiing in winter and water sports and hiking in summer, alongside diverse accommodations and dining options. The nearby Cerro Catedral is the largest ski resort in South America.

The city is a traditional hub for student tourism in Argentina, and is a destination for the customary high school graduation trips. In addition it attracts families from Argentina and neighboring countries celebrating their daughter's Quinceañera (15th birthday).

In 2012, the Argentine Congress passed a resolution declaring Bariloche the "National Capital of Adventure Tourism". In addition to tourism, scientific activities are of growing importance for the city, as it hosts the National Atomic Energy Commission's Bariloche Atomic Centre, as well as the public universities of Comahue, Río Negro and the National Technological.

== History ==
The name Bariloche comes from the Mapudungun word Vuriloche meaning "people from behind the mountain" (vuri = behind, che = people). The Poya people used the Vuriloche pass to cross the Andes, keeping it secret from the Spanish priests for a long time.

There is evidence of the long existence of indigenous settlements on the banks of Lake Nahuel Huapi, in the area now occupied by the city of Bariloche. This was thousands of years before the European expeditionaries and settlers beginning in the colonial era of the 16th century.

Human beings had arrived in this area during the Neolithic era, as evidenced by artifacts. The archaeological and historical record speaks of the presence of tehuelches and puelches in the area.

With the process of araucanization and mainly since the 17th century, the culture of these groups was strongly affected by Mapuches. They increased their occupation in the area, affected by the settlement of Spaniards in Chile, and their continued push to the east.

By the 19th century's end, only a few scattered indigenous families remained near the lake. People of Inacayal had been stripped of their lands, and were relocated to Tecka (Chubut) when their cacique was taken prisoner. Curruhinca had made an act of submission to Argentine government with his own. Some Nguillatun was still being celebrated.

But the region was beginning a new stage in its history. Although incorporated into Argentine national sovereignty, the Nahuel Huapi area began to develop fundamentally linked to Chile. Before the 19th century's end, when the border was still in dispute, people from the south of the neighboring country were gradually arriving to settle in surroundings of the lake. Small farmers were most of them from the island of Chiloe, but German immigrants living in Chile also arrived.

=== Spanish explorations and missions ===
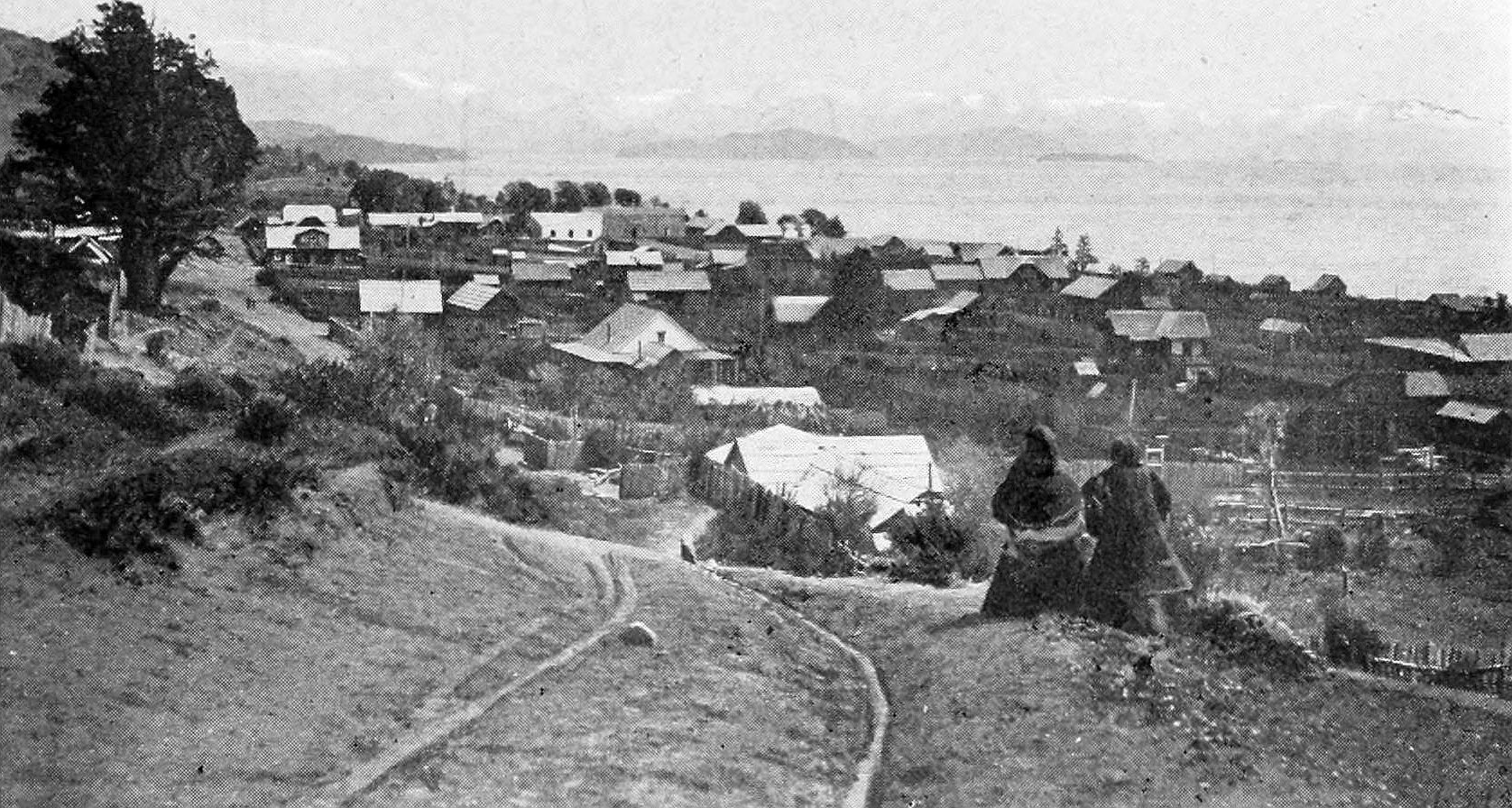
Bariloche, 1916

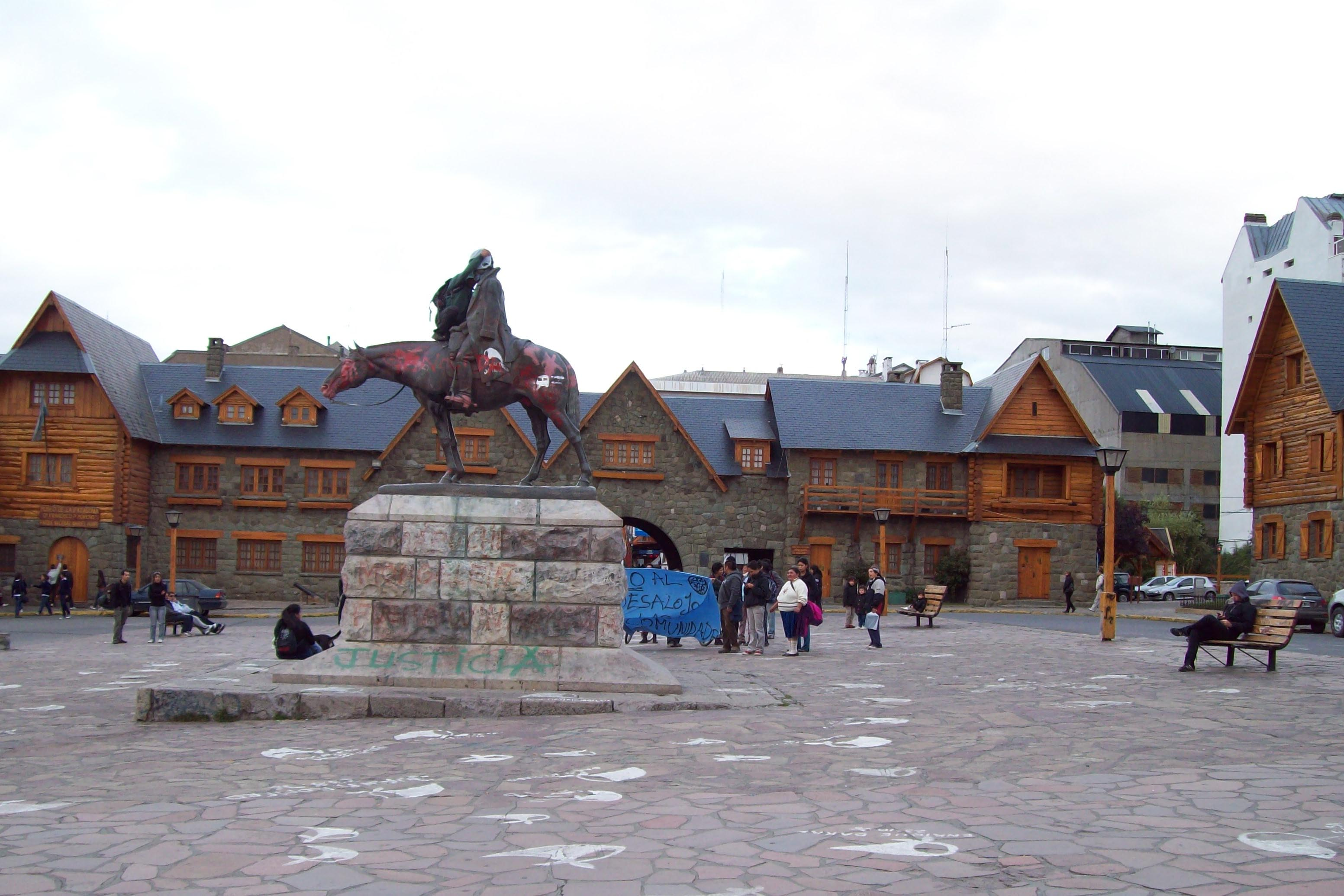
The Civic Centre opened in 1940 and was declared a national monument in 1987

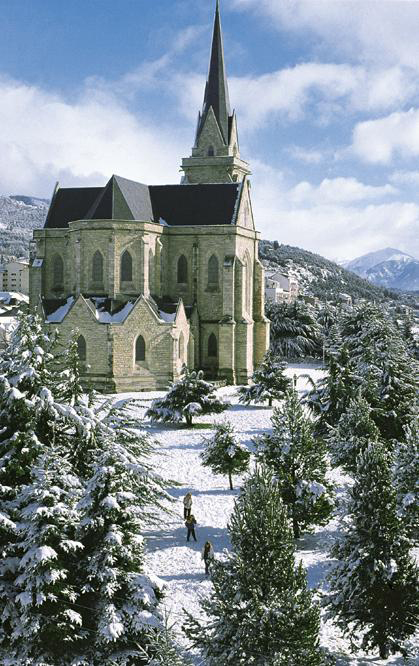
The Neo-Gothic Cathedral of San Carlos de Bariloche had its structure completed in 1947.

Nahuel Huapi lake was known to Spaniards since the times of the Conquest of Chile. Following the trails of the Mapuche people across the Andes, in the summer of 1552–1553, the Spanish Governor of the Captaincy of Chile Pedro de Valdivia sent Francisco de Villagra to explore the area east of the Andes at the latitudes of the city of Valdivia. Francisco de Villagra crossed the Andes through Mamuil Malal Pass and headed south until reaching Limay River in the vicinity of Nahuel Huapi Lake.

Another early Spaniard to visit the zone of Nahuel Huapi Lake was the Jesuit priest Diego de Rosales. He had been ordered to the area by the Governor of Chile Antonio de Acuña Cabrera, who was concerned about the unrest of the native Puelche and Poya after the slave-hunting expeditions carried out by Luis Ponce de León in 1649, who captured Indians and sold them into slavery. Diego de Rosales started his journey at the ruins of Villarica in Chile, crossed the Andes through Mamuil Malal Pass, and traveled further south along the eastern Andean valleys, reaching Nahuel Huapi Lake in 1650.

In 1670, Jesuit priest Nicolás Mascardi, based in Chiloé Archipelago, entered the area through the Reloncaví Estuary and Todos los Santos Lake to found a mission at the Nahuel Huapi Lake, which lasted until 1673. A new mission at the shores of Nahuel Huapi Lake was established in 1703, backed financially from Potosí, thanks to orders from the viceroy of Peru. Historians disagree if the mission belonged to the jurisdiction of Valdivia or Chiloé. According to historic documents, the Poya of Nahuelhuapi requested the mission to be reestablished, apparently to forge an alliance with the Spaniards against the Puelche. Following the 1712 Huilliche rebellion in Chiloé Archipelago some insurgents sought refuge with Father Manuel del Hoyo in the mission.

The mission was destroyed in 1717 by Poyas following a disagreement with the missionaries; the superior of the mission had refused to give them a cow. Soon thereafter authorities learned that four or five people travelling to Concepción had been killed by the Poya. The colonists assembled a punitive expedition in Calbuco and Chiloé. Composed of both Spaniards and indios reyunos, the expedition did not find any Poya.

In 1766 the head of the Mission of Ralún tried to reestablish the mission at Nahuel Huapi, but the following year, the Crown suppressed the Society of Jesus, ordering them out of the colonies in the Americas.

=== 19th century to 1895 ===
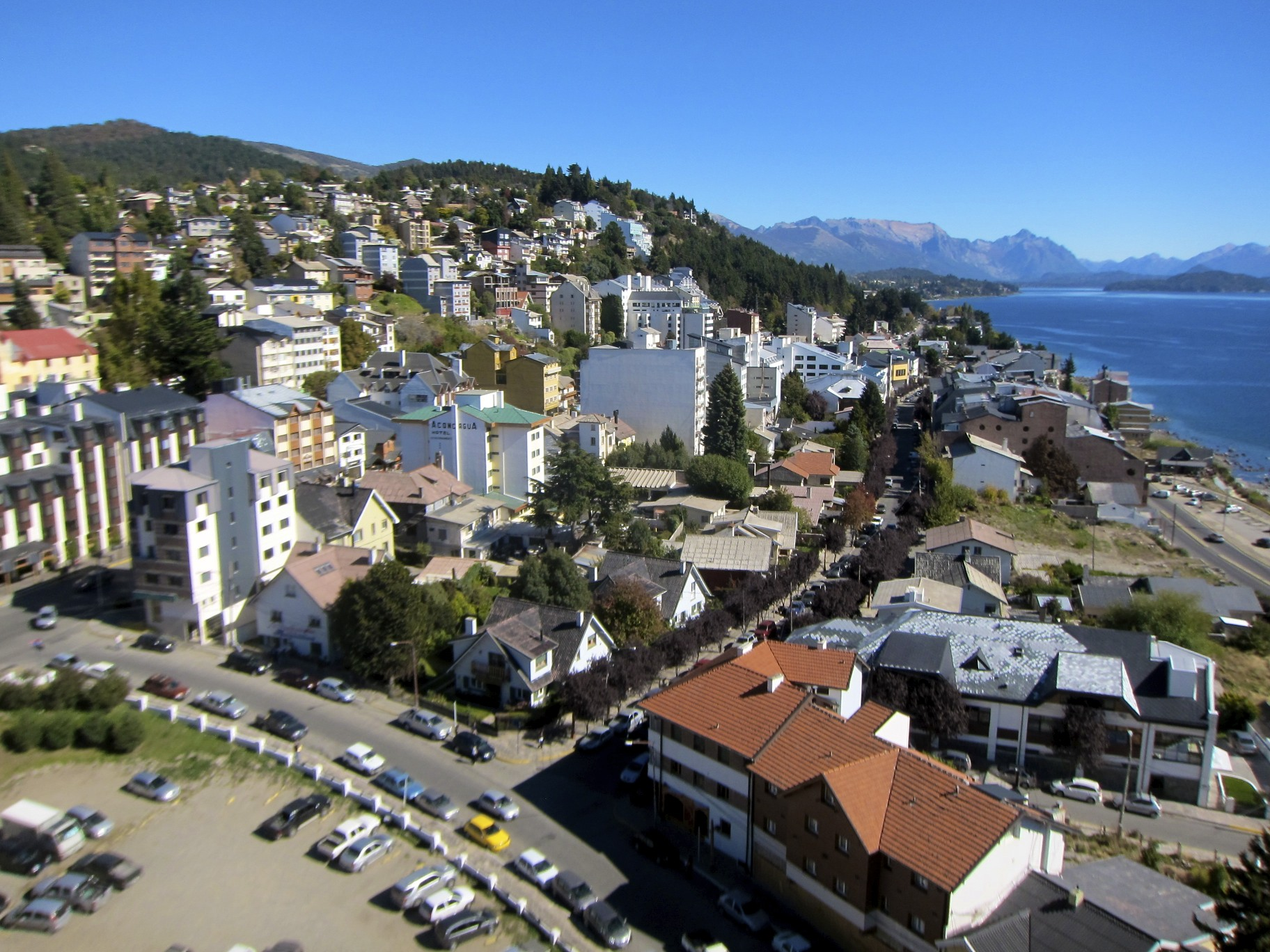
View of the city

The area had stronger connections to Chile than to the distant city of Buenos Aires during most of the 19th century, but the explorations of Francisco Moreno and the Argentine campaigns of the Conquest of the Desert established the legitimacy of the Argentine government. It thought the area was a natural expansion of the Viedma colony and the Andes were the natural frontier to Chile. In the 1881 border treaty between Chile and Argentina, the Nahuel Huapi area was recognized as part of Argentina.

German settlers began to arrive in neighboring southern Chile from the 1840s. Some of these settlers and their descendants begun a lucrative leather industry obtaining leather from indigenous communities across the Andes. In the 1880s, the Argentine Army displaced indigenous communities, disrupting this trade and forcing leather merchants in Chile to cross the Andes to obtain supplies. This way numerous entrepreneurs from Chile, many with a German background, established cattle and trade business in the area of Nahuel Huapi and Lácar lakes.

=== Modern settlement ===
In the summer of 1894-1895 Carlos Wiederhold, a German-Chilean from Osorno, Chile, crossed the poorly known mountain passes of the Andes from Chile into Nahual Huapi Lake. He was aided by the guide Antonio Millaqueo and Daniel Márquez from Chiloé helped them in navigating the lake. Back in Chile Wiederhold bought provisions in Puerto Montt and brought them across the Andes to sell these in the Nahuel Huapi area. Wiederhold established then a little shop called La Alemana (The German) in 1895, and it is from this shop the modern settlement of Bariloche developed from. As Wiederhold was named consul of the German Empire in Chile he left Bariloche for Puerto Montt in the 1900s. In Puerto Montt Wiederhold continued to run the business while in Bariloche Wiederhold's business partner Federico Hube, also a German-Chilean from Osorno, was left in charge of local affairs. By 1900 Chilean merchants dominated trade in the area of Nahuel Huapi Lake by their control of nearby mountain passes. Hube & Achelis controlled Paso Pérez Rosales and Camino y Lacoste did so in Paso Puyehue. A war scare between Chile and Argentina in the 1900s meant some difficulties for these earlier entrepreneurs who later came to benefit from the 1902 boundary arbitration between Chile and Argentina which increased trust along the international boundary. The trade route established by Wiederhold connecting the Pacific port of Puerto Montt with Nahuel Huapi Lake in the inland was well into the 1910s among the most important ones in northern Patagonia.

The Chilean entrepreneurs expanded beyond trade and established husbandry operations around Nahuel Huapi Lake. These enterprises exported meat to Central Chile and imported labour from southern Chile, mainly Chiloé Archipelago, to run the business. Argentine authorities encouraged at first the immigration of Chileans offering land properties if they renounced the Chilean citizenship becoming Argentines. Chilean authorities responded by offering land to those that returned from Argentina. As spontaneous migration from Chiloé Archipelago begun to replace those brought in by enterprises the Argentine authorities came to distrust these migrants. Many independent settlers from Chiloé Archipelago established themselves in Valle Manso south of Bariloche. In the words of historian Jorge Muñoz Sougarett, Argentine authorities viewed these Chileans settlers as "illiterate nomads, vicious and unruly".

In the 1930s, the centre of the city was redesigned to have the appearance of a traditional European central alpine town (it was called "Little Switzerland.") Many buildings were made of wood and stone. In 1909 there were 1,250 inhabitants; a telegraph, post office, and a road connected the city with Neuquén. Commerce continued to depend on Chile until the arrival of the railroad in 1934, which connected the city with Argentine markets.

=== Architectural development and tourism ===
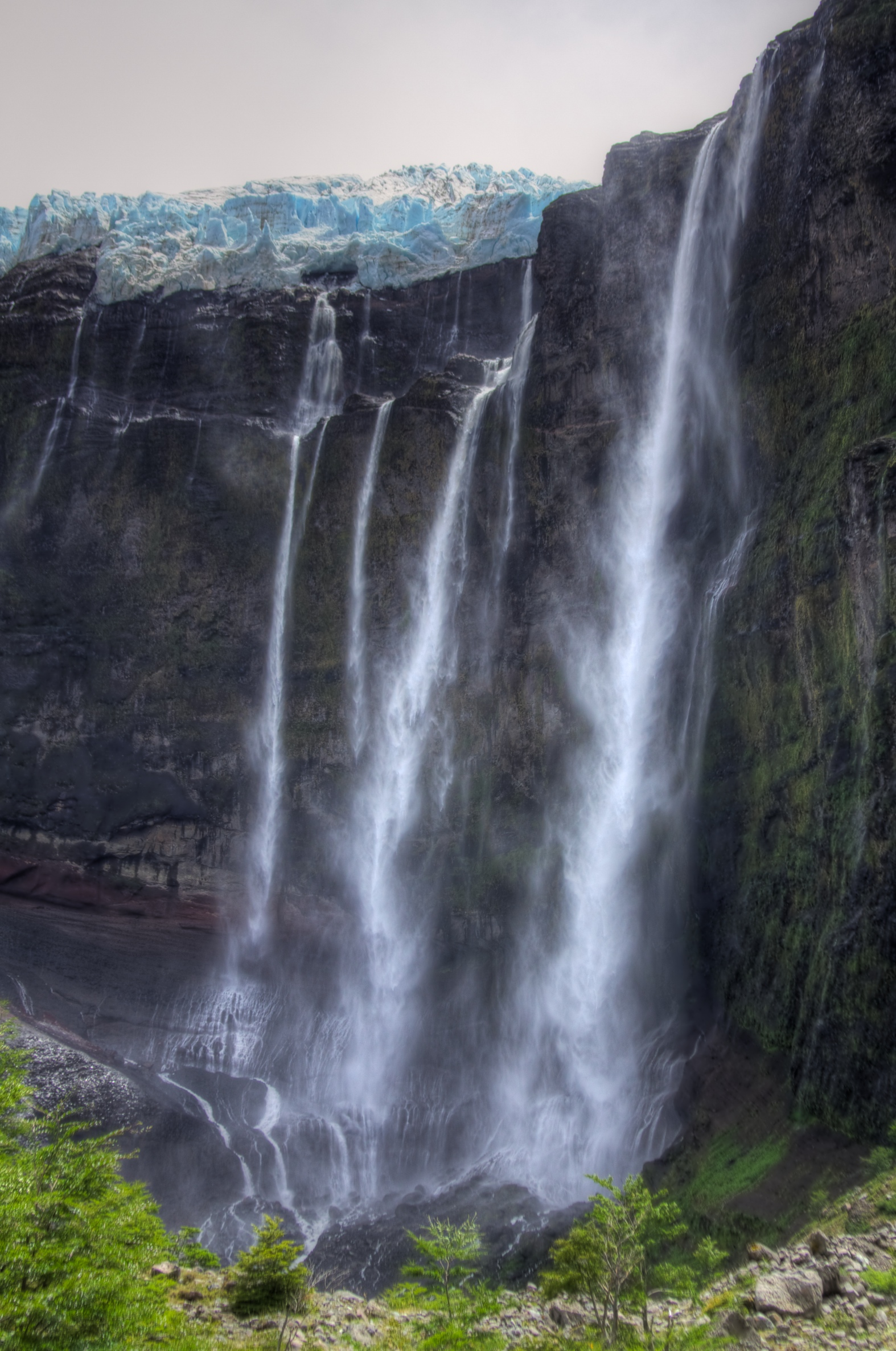
Glacier Castaño Overo spilling water and ice over the cliff on Cerro Tronador

Between 1935 and 1940, the Argentine Directorate of National Parks carried out a number of urban public works, giving the city a distinctive architectural style. Among them, perhaps the best-known is the Civic Centre.

Bariloche grew from being a centre of cattle trade that relied on commerce with Chile, to becoming a tourism centre for the Argentine elite. It took on a cosmopolitan architectural and urban profile. Growth in the city's tourist trade began in the 1930s, when local hotel occupancy grew from 1550 tourists in 1934 to 4000 in 1940.

In 1934 Ezequiel Bustillo, then director of the National Parks Direction, contracted his brother Alejandro Bustillo to build several buildings in Iguazú and Nahuel Huapi National Park (Bariloche was the main settlement inside the park). In contrast to subtropical Iguazú National Park, planners and developers thought that Nahuel Huapi National Park, because of its temperate climate, could compete with the tourism of Europe. Together with Bariloche, it was established for priority projects by national tourism development planners.

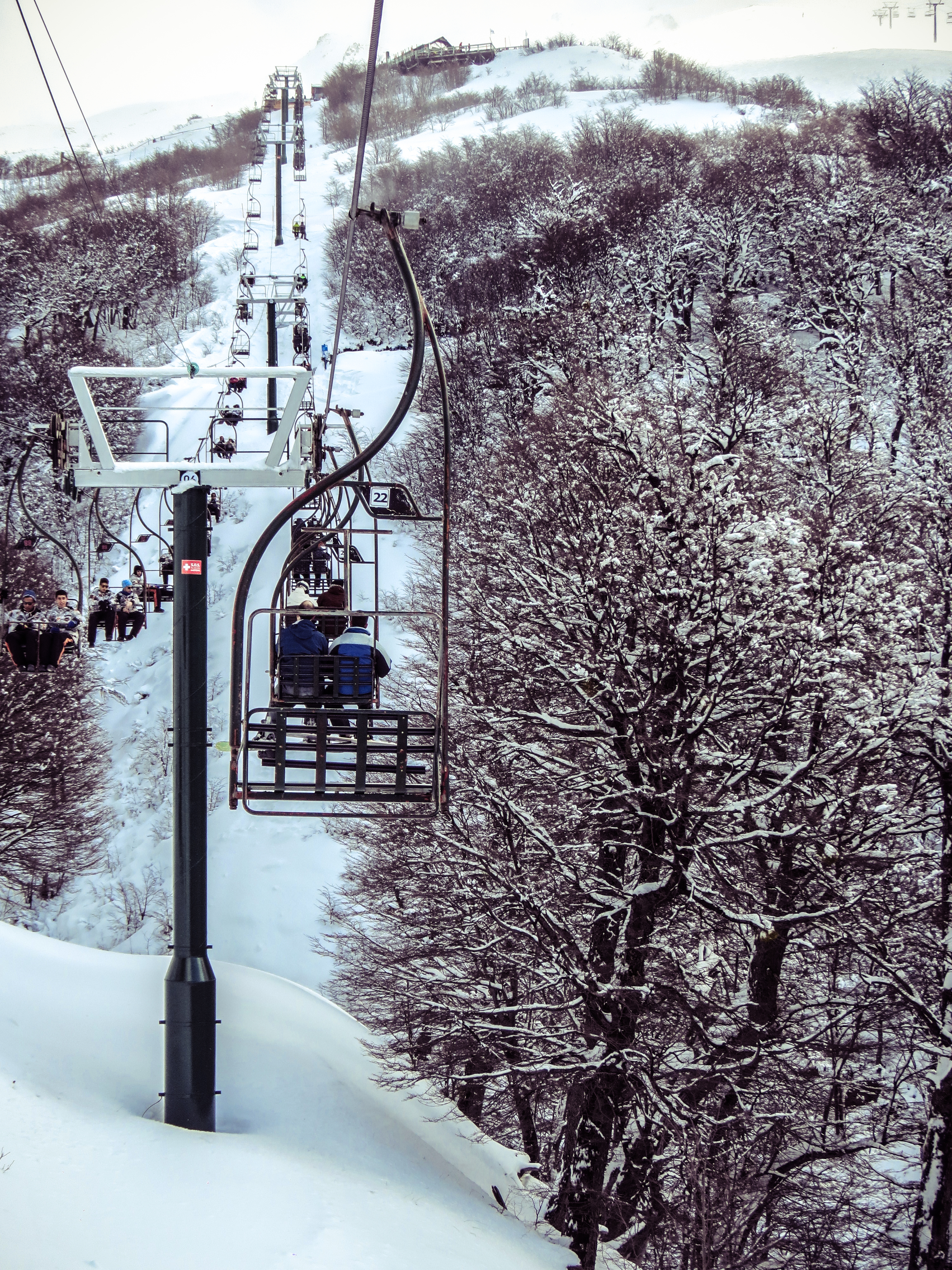
Chairlifts in the Cerro Catedral

Alejandro Bustillo designed the Edificio Movilidad, Plaza Perito Moreno, the Neo-Gothic San Carlos de Bariloche Cathedral, and the Llao Llao Hotel. Architect Ernesto de Estrada designed the Civic Centre of Bariloche, which opened in 1940. The Civic Centre's tuff stone, slate and Fitzroya structures include the Domingo Sarmiento Library, the Francisco Moreno Museum of Patagonia, City Hall, the Post Office, the Police Station, and the Customs.

U.S. President Dwight Eisenhower visited Bariloche in 1960 as a guest of President Arturo Frondizi. Classical violinist Alberto Lysy established the string quartet Camerata Bariloche in 1967.

=== Huemul Project ===
During the 1950s, on the small island of Huemul, not far into lake Nahuel Huapi, former president Juan Domingo Perón tried to have the world's first fusion reactor built secretly. The project cost the equivalent of about $300 million modern US dollars, and it was never finished, due to the lack of the highly advanced technology that was needed. Austrian scientist Ronald Richter was in charge of the project. The facilities can still be visited, and are visible from certain locations on the coast.

=== Nazis in Bariloche ===
In 1995, Bariloche made headlines in the international press when it became known as a place for Nazi war criminals, such as the former SS Hauptsturmführer Erich Priebke and SS officer Reinhard Kopps, known in Argentina as Juan Maler. Priebke had been director of the German School of Bariloche for many years.

The narrative that Adolf Hitler did not commit suicide, but instead escaped Berlin, was first presented to the general public by Marshal Georgy Zhukov at a press conference on 9 June 1945 on orders from Soviet leader Joseph Stalin. That month, 68% of Americans polled thought Hitler was still alive. When asked at the Potsdam Conference in July 1945 how Hitler had died, Stalin said he was living either "in Spain or Argentina."

In his 2004 book Bariloche nazi-guía turística, Argentine author Abel Basti claims that Adolf Hitler and Eva Braun lived in the surroundings of Bariloche for many years after World War II. Basti said that the Argentine Nazis chose the estate of Inalco as Hitler's refuge.

Grey Wolf: The Escape of Adolf Hitler, a 2011 book by English authors Simon Dunstan and Gerrard Williams, proposed that Hitler and Eva Braun escaped from Berlin in 1945. The authors say the couple flew to Denmark, then to Spain and from there to the Canary Islands, where they boarded a U-Boat and crossed the Atlantic to Argentina, where thousands of Nazis were provided sanctuary by president Juan Perón. He and his wife Eva Perón had been receiving money from the Nazis for some time. The FBI received claims saying that Hitler allegedly arrived in Argentina, first staying at Hacienda San Ramón, a rural property 10 kilometres (6 mi) east of Bariloche owned by Stephan von Schaumburg-Lippe, a relative of Prince Bernhard. Next he purportedly moved to a Bavarian-style mansion at Inalco, a remote and barely accessible spot at the northwest end of Nahuel Huapi Lake, close to the Chilean border. Supposedly, Eva Braun left Hitler around 1954 and moved to Neuquén with their daughter Ursula ('Uschi'). According to the authors, Adolf Hitler died in February 1962 at age 73, and Eva Braun was alleged to be alive in the 2000s.

== Tourism ==
Tourism, both domestic and international, is the main economic activity of Bariloche throughout the year. The city is very popular with Brazilians, Europeans and Israelis. One of the most popular activities is skiing, and most tourists visit Bariloche in winter (June–September). Regular flights from Buenos Aires via LAN airlines and Aerolíneas Argentinas serve the city year round. The main ski slopes are the ones at Cerro Catedral, the biggest ski resort in South America and in the southern hemisphere.

During the summer, beaches such as Playa Bonita and Villa Tacul welcome sun-bathers; lake swimmers venture into its cold waters (chilled by melting snow). Lake Nahuel Huapi averages 14 °C (57 °F) in the summertime.

Bariloche is the biggest city of a huge Lakes District, and it serves as a base for many excursions in the region. Activities such as fishing, whitewater rafting, and birdwatching are popular with tourists. Trekking along trails in the nearby mountain wilderness is supported by a few high-mountain huts operated by the Club Andino Bariloche. The city is noted for its chocolates and Swiss-style architecture. Many high school students in Argentina take a senior trip to Bariloche, and the town is well prepared to host these kinds of groups. In November 2012, Bariloche was named "national capital of adventure tourism" under Law 26802 passed by the Argentine National Congress.

In 2025, San Carlos de Bariloche recorded an increase in visitor volume, reaching a total of 1,574,795 tourist arrivals. According to an annual report published by the Bariloche Hotel and Gastronomic Business Association (AEHG), approximately 80% of total visitors originated from domestic destinations within Argentina.

== Science ==
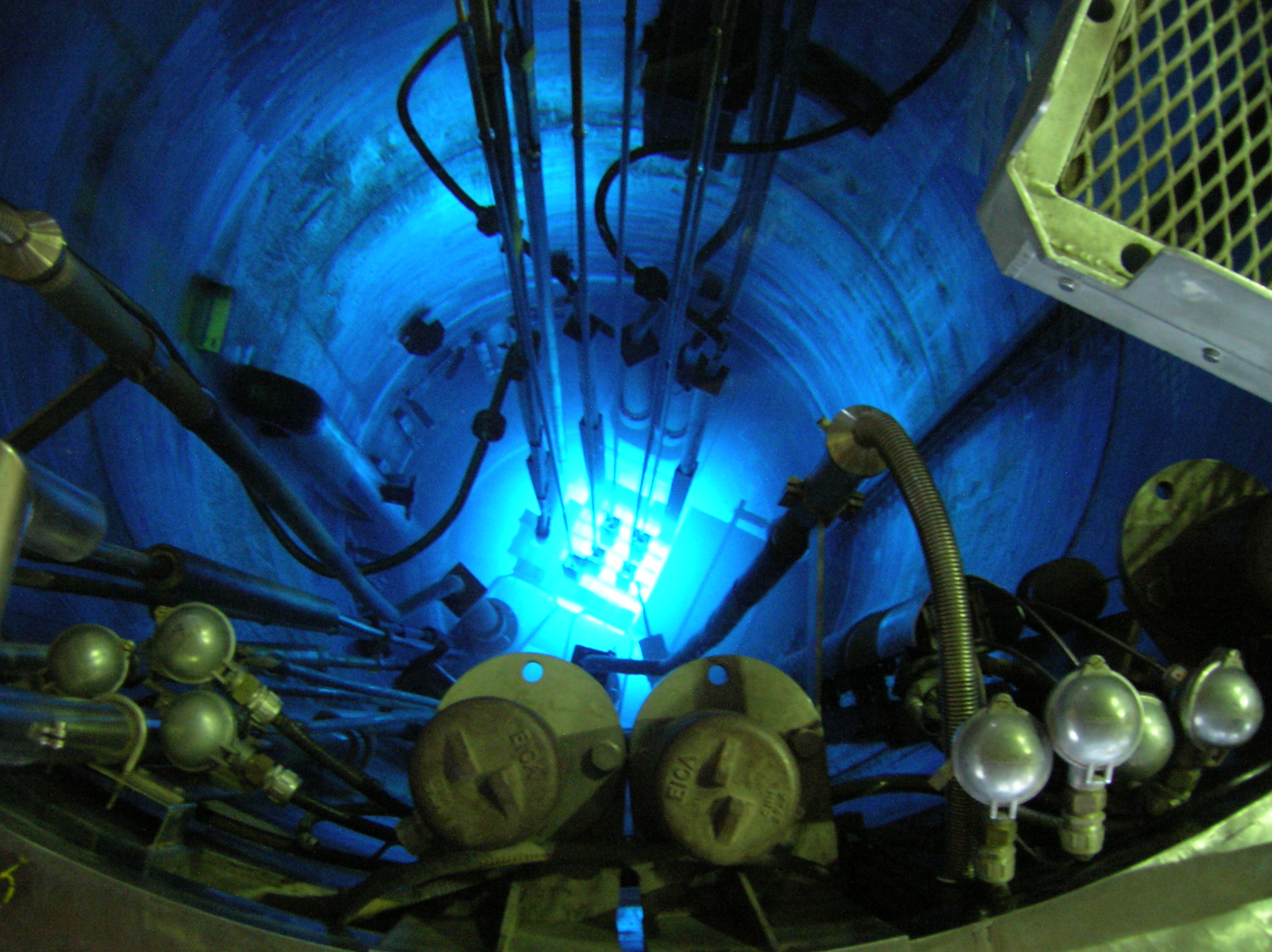
Reactor core of the RA-6 Training and Research Reactor at Centro Atómico Bariloche.

Besides tourism and related services, Bariloche is home of advanced scientific and technological activities. The Centro Atómico Bariloche is a research center of the National Atomic Energy Commission, where basic and applied research in many areas of the physical sciences is carried out. The complex also houses Instituto Balseiro, a higher education institution of the Universidad Nacional de Cuyo, with a small and carefully selected number of students. The institute confers degrees in Physics and Nuclear, Mechanical and Telecommunications Engineering, as well as Masters and Doctorate degrees in Physics and Engineering. The city also hosts INVAP, a high-technology company that designs and builds nuclear reactors, state-of-the-art radars and space satellites, among other projects.

The private, non-profit organization Bariloche Foundation continues the tradition of scientific research in the city. Started in 1963, it promotes postgraduate teaching and research. There are also several departments and laboratories at the National University of Comahue.

== Geography ==
=== Climate ===
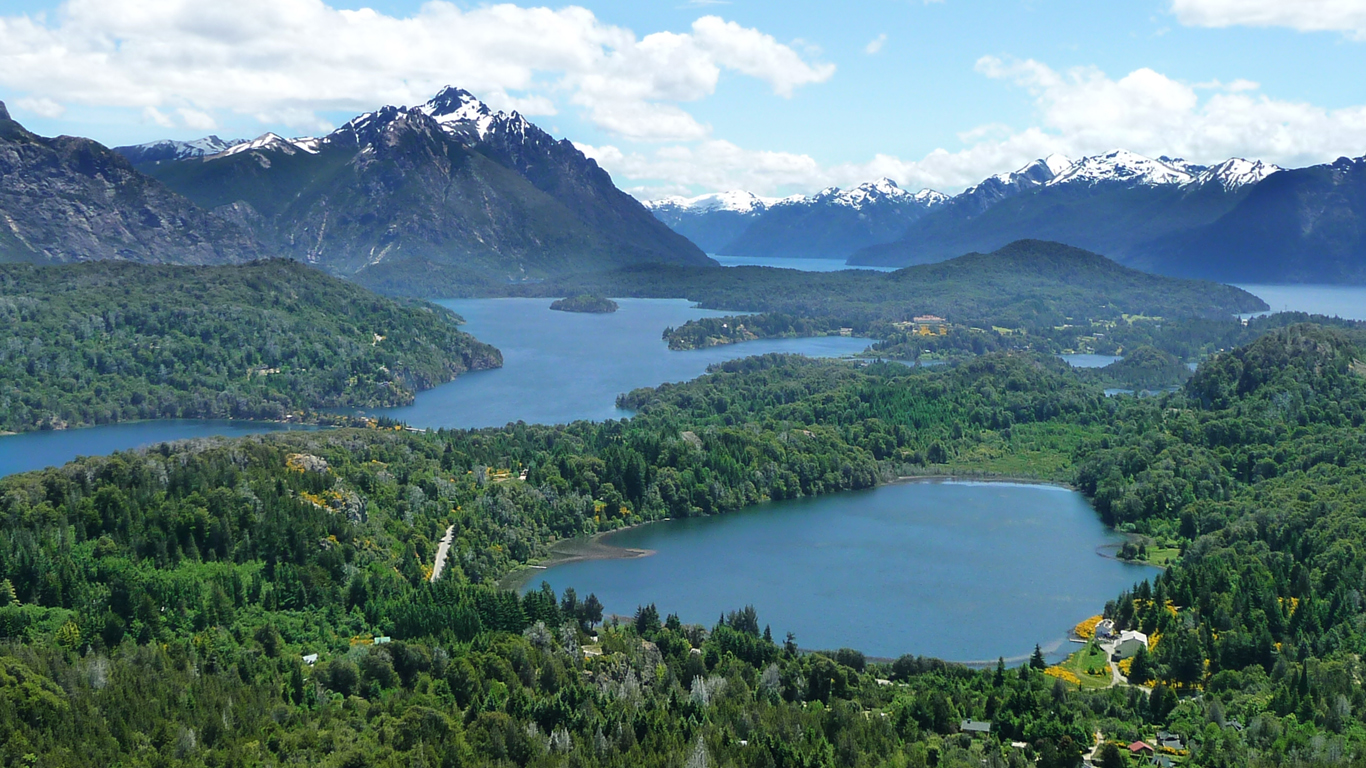
View of the Nahuel Huapi National Park landscape surrounding Bariloche

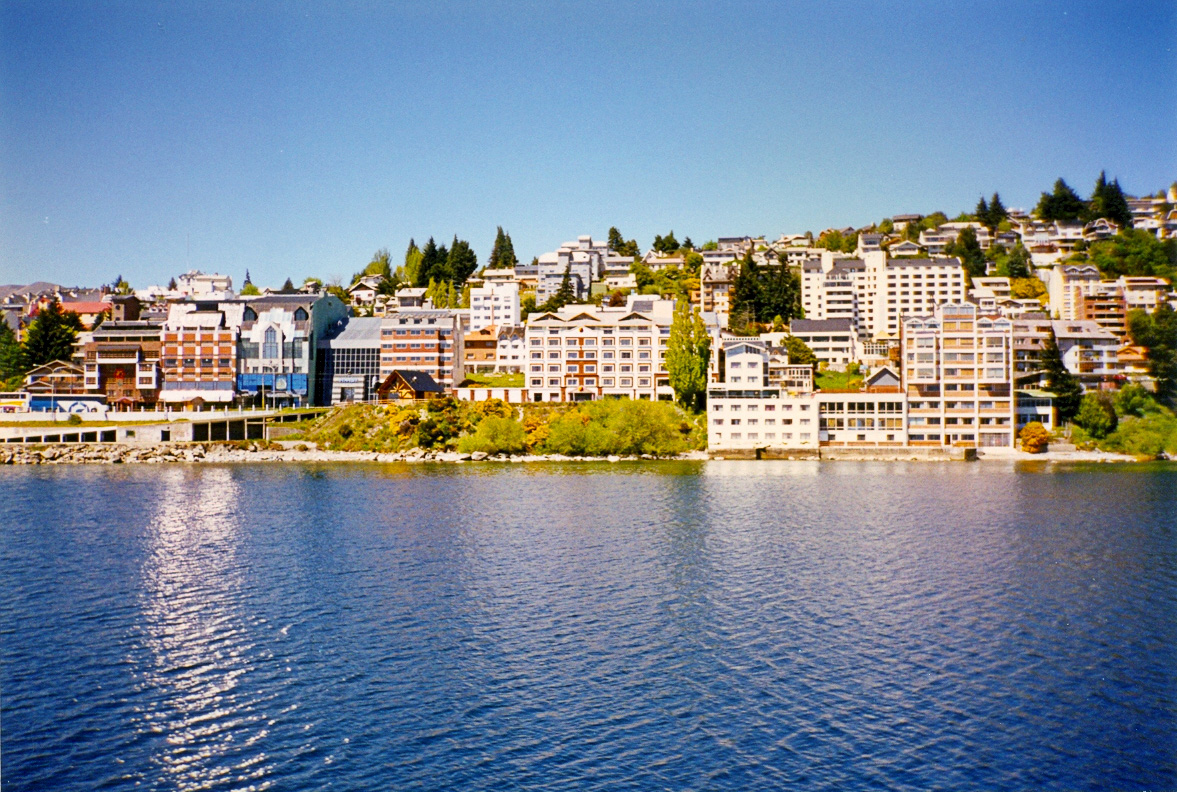
View of the city from the lakeside in summer

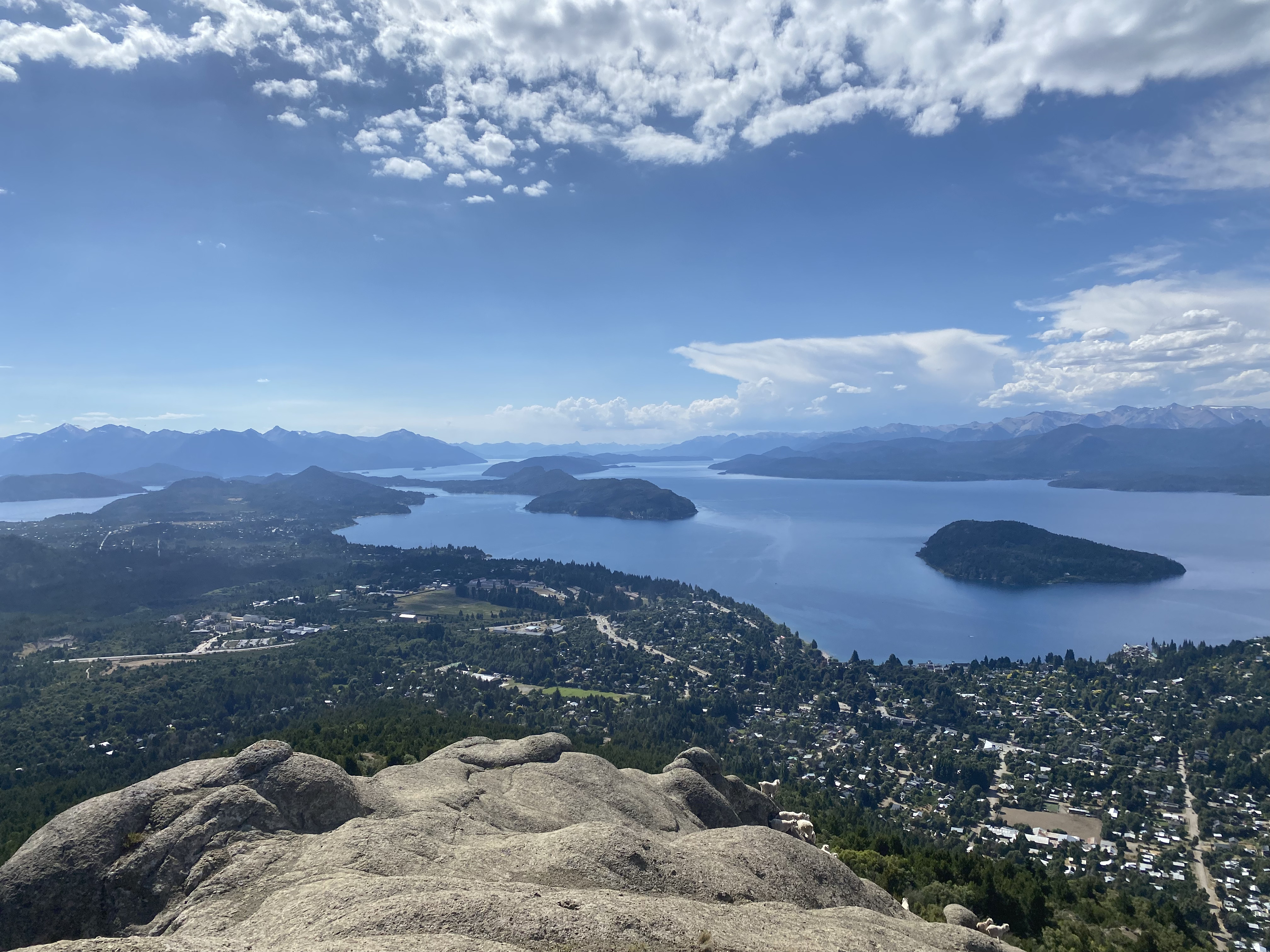
Nahuel Huapi Lake captured from Cerro Otto's top in summer

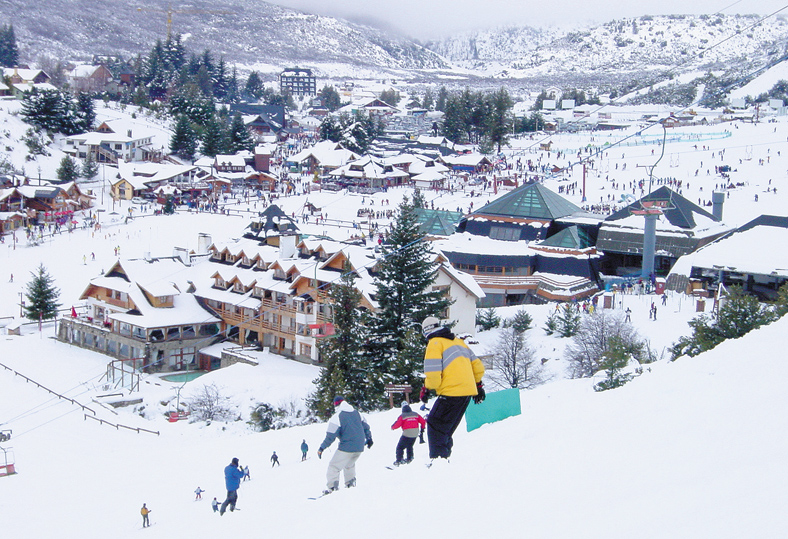
Cerro Catedral ski resort in July

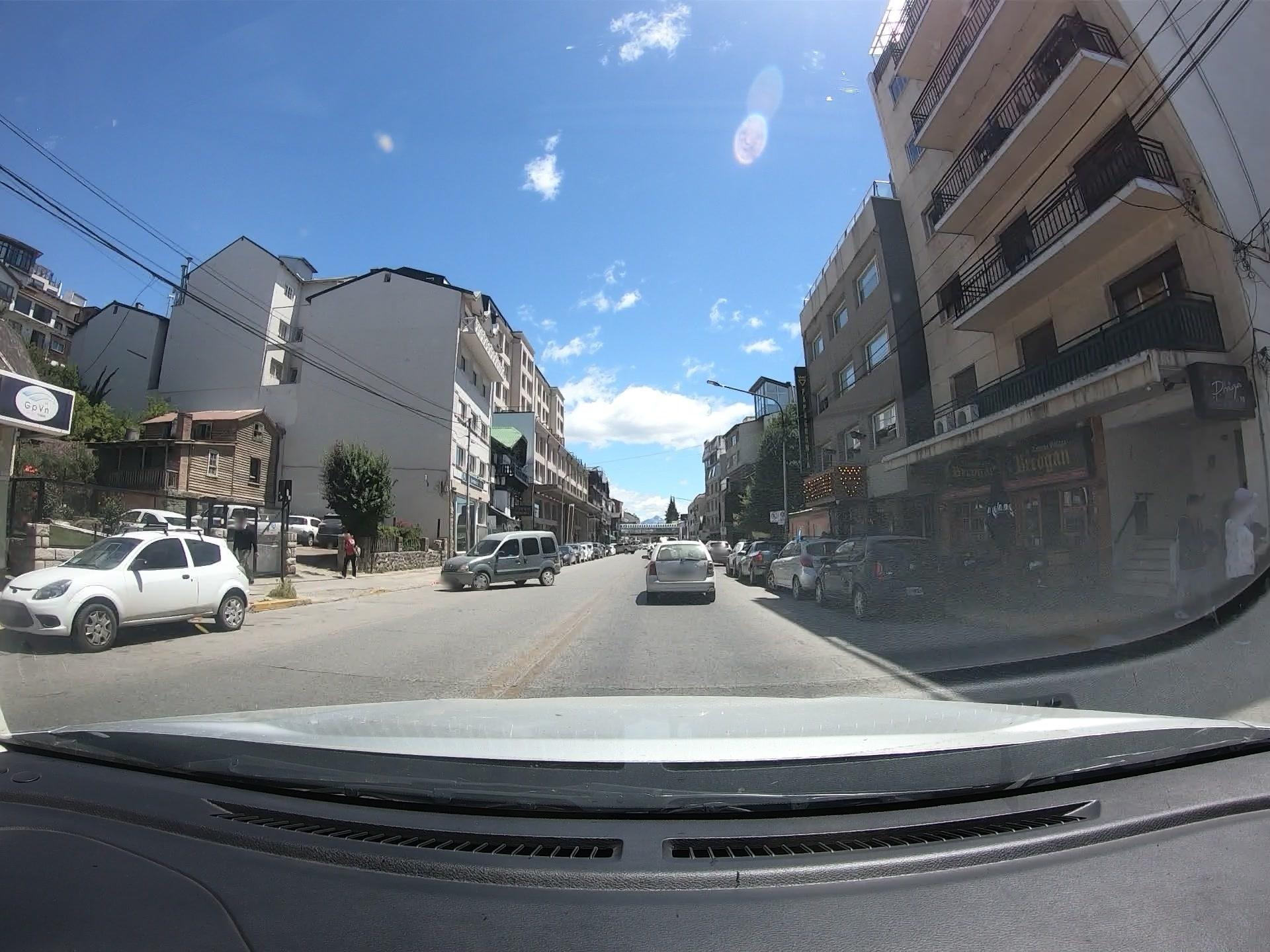
View of a street in Bariloche

Bariloche lies in the transition between a cool Mediterranean climate (Köppen Csb) and an Oceanic climate (Köppen: Cfb), with marked alpine characteristics (low nighttime temperatures, wide temperature variations, high thermal amplitude). The combination of its altitude, latitude, and predominance of west-northwest winds cause the climate to be classified as a cool temperate climate with a dry season that presents a west–east precipitation gradient. Mean annual precipitation ranges from 4,000 mm (157 in) in the Andean peaks and in Puerto Blest to only 600 mm (24 in) in the Limay River area. In the urban areas, mean annual precipitation ranges from 800 to 1,000 mm (31 to 39 in). Most of this is concentrated in autumn and winter, which are responsible for 70% of the annual precipitation.

The mean annual temperature in Bariloche is 8.4 °C (47 °F) in the city centre (1901–1950). At the airport in the eastern end, the mean annual temperature is 8.3 °C (47 °F) (for the period 1981–2010). In January, daytime temperatures normally range from 20 to 28 °C (68 to 82 °F) and may occasionally go up to 30 °C (86 °F). The average minimum in January is 8.2 °C (47 °F) at the city centre and 6.6 °C (44 °F) at the airport although during warm days, nighttime temperatures can reach to 15 °C (59 °F). In winter, daytime temperatures range from 1 to 8 °C (34 to 46 °F) while nighttime temperatures approach freezing or less. Temperatures vary by altitude; in general, the temperature decreases by 6 °C (11 °F) for every 1,000 metres (3,281 ft) increase in altitude.

The weather is characterized by being windy throughout the year; 85% of the days are windy and calm days are rare. Most of the wind predominantly comes from the west-northwest with easterly winds being rare. Normally, the winds are strong, particularly in spring where gusts can exceed 100 km/h (62 mph).

At the city centre, mean annual precipitation is 1,092 mm (43 in) in which there are 122 days with precipitation. In the eastern end where the airport is located, precipitation is lower, averaging 791 mm (31 in). In winter when temperatures are lower, snowfall can occur, which is favoured by the low evapotranspiration. In spring, melt from snow and lower temperatures lead to moist conditions that facilitate the development of dense forest and agricultural activities.

The water temperatures in the lakes are always low, ranging from 12 to 15 °C (54 to 59 °F). This is due to the lakes being large, making it difficult for the sun to influence their temperature, owing to their large heat capacity. Smaller lakes can freeze in the winter, particularly those located in the higher elevations.

Climate data for San Carlos de Bariloche Airport (1991–2020, extremes 1951–present) (Note: The record highs and lows are based on the INTA link for the period 1951–1990 while records beyond 1990 come from the Oficina de Riesgo Agropecuario link since it only covers from 1970–present. As a result, the most extreme values from either source are used.)
Month	Jan	Feb	Mar	Apr	May	Jun	Jul	Aug	Sep	Oct	Nov	Dec	Year
Record high °C (°F)	36.4 (97.5)	35.4 (95.7)	34.4 (93.9)	26.3 (79.3)	22.6 (72.7)	19.4 (66.9)	16.7 (62.1)	19.6 (67.3)	23.0 (73.4)	29.1 (84.4)	32.5 (90.5)	33.9 (93.0)	36.4 (97.5)
Mean daily maximum °C (°F)	23.2 (73.8)	23.1 (73.6)	20.1 (68.2)	15.0 (59.0)	10.6 (51.1)	7.2 (45.0)	6.7 (44.1)	8.4 (47.1)	11.6 (52.9)	14.7 (58.5)	17.9 (64.2)	20.7 (69.3)	14.9 (58.8)
Daily mean °C (°F)	15.4 (59.7)	15.0 (59.0)	12.1 (53.8)	8.1 (46.6)	5.2 (41.4)	3.0 (37.4)	2.1 (35.8)	3.1 (37.6)	5.2 (41.4)	7.9 (46.2)	10.9 (51.6)	13.5 (56.3)	8.5 (47.3)
Mean daily minimum °C (°F)	7.0 (44.6)	6.6 (43.9)	4.9 (40.8)	2.4 (36.3)	1.0 (33.8)	−0.5 (31.1)	−1.6 (29.1)	−1.0 (30.2)	−0.1 (31.8)	1.7 (35.1)	3.9 (39.0)	5.9 (42.6)	2.5 (36.5)
Record low °C (°F)	−5.7 (21.7)	−6.9 (19.6)	−10.0 (14.0)	−11.1 (12.0)	−11.4 (11.5)	−21.1 (−6.0)	−25.4 (−13.7)	−17.4 (0.7)	−17.3 (0.9)	−10.7 (12.7)	−7.0 (19.4)	−8.5 (16.7)	−25.4 (−13.7)
Average precipitation mm (inches)	23.6 (0.93)	17.5 (0.69)	29.4 (1.16)	57.1 (2.25)	113.7 (4.48)	168.3 (6.63)	126.4 (4.98)	117.3 (4.62)	55.4 (2.18)	48.7 (1.92)	30.1 (1.19)	25.0 (0.98)	812.5 (31.99)
Average snowfall cm (inches)	0.0 (0.0)	0.5 (0.2)	0.0 (0.0)	3.4 (1.3)	7.0 (2.8)	32.4 (12.8)	41.7 (16.4)	22.9 (9.0)	6.2 (2.4)	5.8 (2.3)	0.2 (0.1)	0.0 (0.0)	120.1 (47.3)
Average precipitation days (≥ 0.1 mm)	3.5	3.3	6.0	7.9	13.0	15.9	14.4	13.5	9.0	8.2	5.5	4.8	105.0
Average snowy days	0.0	0.1	0.0	0.5	1.3	5.1	5.9	4.4	2.0	1.6	0.3	0.1	21.3
Average relative humidity (%)	51.9	53.3	60.2	68.2	76.0	79.1	78.0	74.9	66.9	61.5	56.6	53.6	65.0
Mean monthly sunshine hours	334.7	283.3	241.6	183.7	130.4	96.0	124.7	146.9	189.9	239.3	290.7	296.3	2,594.6
Percentage possible sunshine	75	72	65	56	45	39	40	47	54	61	71	72	58
Source 1: Servicio Meteorológico Nacional (July record low, February record high)
Source 2: Instituto Nacional de Tecnología Agropecuaria (rain and snow data 1951–1990), World Meteorological Organization (sunshine hours 1981–2010), NOAA (percent sun 1961–1990),

Climate data for San Carlos de Bariloche (city centre) 1901–1950 (Note: In the Secretaria de Mineria and INTA link, the data from 1901-1950 corresponds to the data recorded in the downtown station (Bariloche Ciudad) while the data from 1951-1990 corresponds to the data recorded from the airport)
Month	Jan	Feb	Mar	Apr	May	Jun	Jul	Aug	Sep	Oct	Nov	Dec	Year
Record high °C (°F)	35.3 (95.5)	35.5 (95.9)	30.0 (86.0)	24.7 (76.5)	22.7 (72.9)	19.0 (66.2)	18.0 (64.4)	19.1 (66.4)	22.5 (72.5)	27.2 (81.0)	32.0 (89.6)	33.5 (92.3)	35.5 (95.9)
Mean daily maximum °C (°F)	20.8 (69.4)	20.6 (69.1)	17.8 (64.0)	13.9 (57.0)	9.9 (49.8)	6.9 (44.4)	6.5 (43.7)	7.8 (46.0)	10.3 (50.5)	13.8 (56.8)	15.4 (59.7)	18.1 (64.6)	13.5 (56.3)
Daily mean °C (°F)	14.4 (57.9)	14.2 (57.6)	11.8 (53.2)	8.7 (47.7)	5.7 (42.3)	3.7 (38.7)	3.0 (37.4)	3.6 (38.5)	5.4 (41.7)	8.2 (46.8)	10.2 (50.4)	12.2 (54.0)	8.4 (47.1)
Mean daily minimum °C (°F)	8.2 (46.8)	8.1 (46.6)	6.3 (43.3)	4.0 (39.2)	2.1 (35.8)	0.5 (32.9)	−0.3 (31.5)	0.0 (32.0)	1.1 (34.0)	3.0 (37.4)	4.8 (40.6)	6.6 (43.9)	3.7 (38.7)
Record low °C (°F)	−0.1 (31.8)	−0.7 (30.7)	−4.0 (24.8)	−7.8 (18.0)	−7.8 (18.0)	−18.0 (−0.4)	−11.8 (10.8)	−10.9 (12.4)	−7.8 (18.0)	−5.6 (21.9)	−4.7 (23.5)	−0.6 (30.9)	−18.0 (−0.4)
Average precipitation mm (inches)	31.2 (1.23)	29.3 (1.15)	61.7 (2.43)	82.2 (3.24)	173.4 (6.83)	200.8 (7.91)	167.8 (6.61)	129.0 (5.08)	83.1 (3.27)	43.0 (1.69)	51.9 (2.04)	43.1 (1.70)	1,096.5 (43.17)
Average relative humidity (%)	62	64	67	73	80	82	81	78	72	68	67	65	72
Source 1: Instituto Nacional de Tecnología Agropecuaria
Source 2: Secretaria de Mineria (extremes 1901–1950)

=== Geology ===
The central parts of Bariloche are built on a landscape of moraines and, next to the lake, of alluvial and lacustrine plains and terraces. The subsoil of the city consists partially of a succession of tills deposited during the Last Ice Age.

== Flora ==
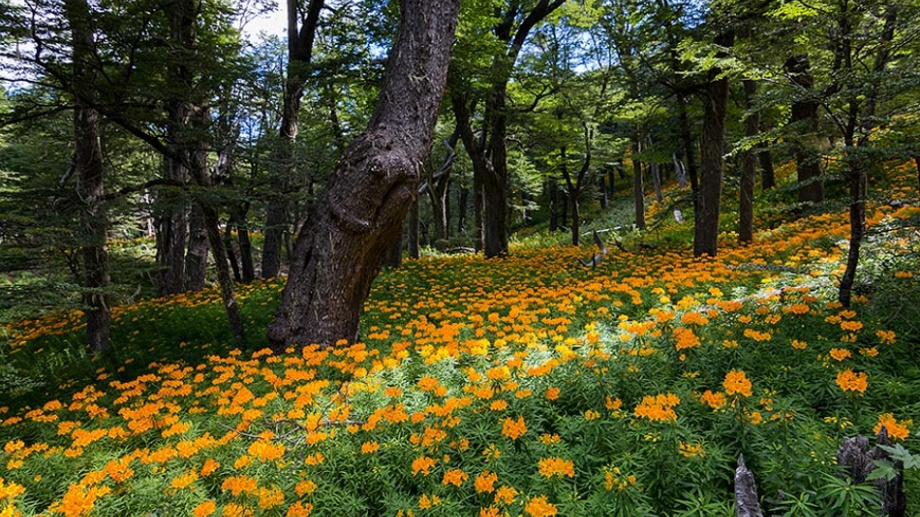
Part of the forest in the mountain.

Bariloche is in the transition area between the Patagonian steppe and Valdivian forest, therefore it is rich in a variety of native species, of which the following is a list.

- Fitzroya cupressoides, Alerce
- Drimys winteri, Canelo
- Lomatia hirsuta, Radal
- Nothofagus nervosa, Raulí
- Nothofagus dombeyi, Coihue
- Nothofagus betuloides, Coihue de Magallanes
- Nothofagus antarctica, Ñire
- Nothofagus pumilio, Lenga
- Nothofagus obliqua, Roble Pellín
- Chusquea culeou, Caña Colihue
- Maytenus boaria, Maitén
- Austrocedrus chilensis, Ciprés
- Luma apiculata, Arrayán
- Embothrium coccineum, Notro
- Araucaria araucana, Araucaria
- Gevuina avellana, Avellano
- Alstroemeria aurea, Amancay
- Fuchsia magellanica, Chilco

== Transportation ==
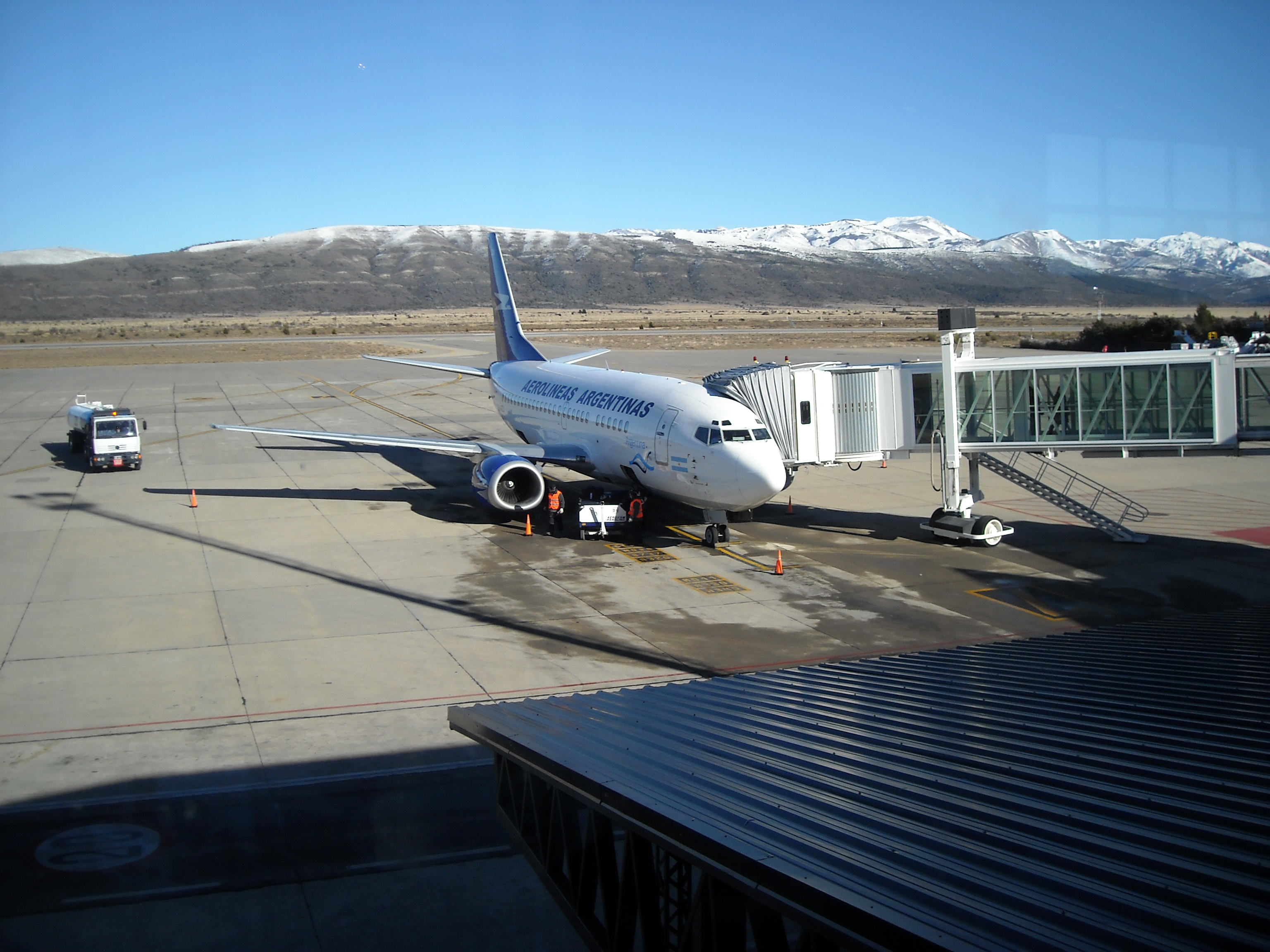
Bariloche Airport.

The city is served by San Carlos de Bariloche International Airport (IATA BRC/ICAO SAZS) equipped to receive any kind of aircraft. Several of Argentina's most important airlines maintain regular flights to Bariloche, as well as some international lines from neighbouring countries, especially during the ski season. The city is linked by train with the city of Viedma through the Tren Patagonico that crosses Argentina from the Andes to the Atlantic Ocean.

Bariloche can also be reached by buses and private cars. The main land routes from North are RN 40, coming from Villa La Angostura, San Martín de los Andes and Mendoza Province, and RN 237 that enters from Neuquén and connects through Argentine's route system with Buenos Aires and Eastern/Central Argentina. Other options are, from the East, by RN 23 (partially paved), crossing the railway line to Viedma (Línea Sur), or from the South by RN 40, coming from the town of El Bolsón (until 2003 this road was numbered RN 258).

San Carlos de Bariloche lies close to the Chilean border and is connected to Chile by the Cardenal Antonio Samoré Pass (125 km North-West from Bariloche, near Villa La Angostura) crossing the Andes Mountains.

A terminal railway station links Bariloche to Viedma.

=== Internal transportation ===
Within the city, Mibus is the single mass transit bus company that works, this bus line operates with the SUBE card. The Company Las Grutas that connects Bariloche with Dina Huapi also runs through part of the city, although this line operates with its own card.

== Military ==
Bariloche is home of the army's "12° Regimiento de Infantería de Montaña" (12th Mountain Infantry Regiment), where military personnel are instructed in mountainous conditions, including combat, survival, and skiing. It is usual for the Regiment to receive infantry personnel from other parts of the country and train them. Furthermore, the Escuela Militar de Montaña, the mountain warfare school of the Argentine Army is located in Bariloche.

== Neighbourhoods ==
The main Neighbourhoods are Belgrano, Jardín Botánico, Melipal, Centro, Las Victorias, Las Marias, Dos Valles, Playa Bonita, Arelauquen, Los Coihues y Llao Llao.

== Municipal landfill – Health policies ==
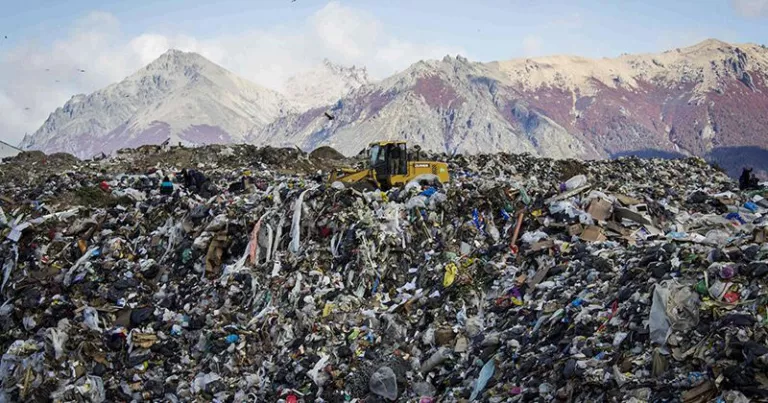
Bariloche municipal landfill.

In 2019, San Carlos de Bariloche was listed in a report published by the International Solid Waste Association (ISWA), based in Austria, as one of the 50 most polluting landfills in the world, based on the impacts it causes and its location in relation to urban areas.

The request for the transfer of the Bariloche dump, located on National Route 40 (Argentina) south, was being surrounded by neighborhoods with a high population density, it is already historic. Added to the situation of environmental collapse is the desperate situation of a large number of people who go to the dump daily in search of food or shelter. In addition, the fires in various sectors of the landfill also became recurrent, affecting not only those who work in the dump but also the closest neighborhoods, without forgetting to mention the forests that surround it, the fauna that inhabits them, and the water, that is deposited in layers that end up in the lake from which the local inhabitants extract the water to drink.

== Sports ==
The Andean Club Bariloche (Spanish: Club Andino Bariloche-CAB) was co-organiser of the 1st and the 3rd South American Ski Mountaineering Championships.

The Club Deportivo Cruz del Sur takes part in Torneo Federal B, the fourth tier of the Argentine football league system. The sides Estudiantes Unidos and Estrella del Sur also participated in lower Argentine leagues.

== Twin towns – sister cities ==
Bariloche is twinned with:

- Aspen, United States
- L'Aquila, Italy
- Osorno, Chile
- Puerto Montt, Chile
- Puerto Varas, Chile
- Purranque, Chile
- St. Moritz, Switzerland
- Queenstown, New Zealand

== See also ==
- Club Andino Bariloche
- Ferrocarril General Roca
- Nahuel Huapi National Park
- Servicios Ferroviarios Patagónico
- The German Doctor
