= Valle El Manso =

Valleys of Argentina

- Width: 2 km (1 mi)
- Depth: 1.3 km (1 mi)

Geography
- Location: Río Negro Province, Argentina
- Coordinates: 41°35′44.78″S 71°44′16.08″W
- Interactive map of Valle El Manso

Valle El Manso is a valley in the Andes of Río Negro Province, Argentine Patagonia. Located in the vicinity of Chile it was settled in the late 19th century by Chileans of mestizo and Mapuche stock as well by European immigrants. Chiloé Archipelago in particular was the place of origin of most Chilean settlers. Early settlers engaged in subsistence farming. The valley was used to move cattle from the interior of Patagonia to the ports in the Pacific.

The combination of its altitude, latitude, and predominance of west-northwest winds cause the climate of Valle El Manso to be classified as a cool temperate climate with a dry season that presents a west–east precipitation gradient.

Manso River that runs through the valley drains by Puelo River to the Reloncaví Estuary in the Pacific Ocean.
