= Bariloche Department =

Administrative division of Argentina

Bariloche Departamento Bariloche
- Department
- Location of Bariloche within Río Negro
- Country: Argentina
- Province: Río Negro
- Capital: San Carlos de Bariloche

Area
  - Total: 5,415 km^{2} (2,091 sq mi)

Population (2022)
  - Total: 162,088
  - Density: 29.93/km^{2} (77.53/sq mi)
- Time zone: UTC−3 (ART)

Bariloche Department (Departamento Bariloche) is an administrative department of Río Negro Province, Argentina, located in the western part of the province along the border with Chile. It lies within the Andean Patagonian region and is characterized by mountainous terrain, glacial lakes, and forested landscapes. The department’s administrative seat and largest urban center is San Carlos de Bariloche, where most of the population is concentrated. A significant portion of the department falls within Nahuel Huapi National Park, contributing to its environmental and touristic importance. Tourism is a key economic activity, particularly related to winter sports, outdoor recreation, and nature-based travel.

== Geography ==
The department lies in the extreme west of the Rio Negro province.

Its borders adjoin:

- Neuquén Province to the north
- Pilcaniyeu and Ñorquincó departments to the east
- Chubut Province to the south
- Chile on the west

The city of San Carlos de Bariloche functions as the administrative centre of the province.
