= Huelmo–Mascardi Cold Reversal =

Cooling event in South America between 11,400 and 10,200 14C years BP

The Huelmo–Mascardi Cold Reversal (HMCR) is a cooling event in South America between 11,400 and 10,200 ^{14}C years BP. This cooling began about 550 years before the Younger Dryas cooling in the Northern Hemisphere, and both periods ended at about the same time.

The event was given its name from the Huelmo, Chile, and Mascardi Lake, Argentina (Nahuel Huapi National Park) sites where it was detected and dated.

The HMCR cooling event began with the accentuation of a cooling period which began 12,400 ^{14}C yr BP. The 11,400 ^{14}C yr BP (13,400 calendar years BP) event onset took place 400–700 years before the onset of the Younger Dryas event. The 10,200 ^{14}C yr BP (circa 11,500 cal yr BP) end date is difficult to calibrate to a calendar year because it took place during a radiocarbon age plateau. The end of the HMCR also marked the end of the cooling period.
