= Nicolás Mascardi =

Italian missionary (1625–1673)

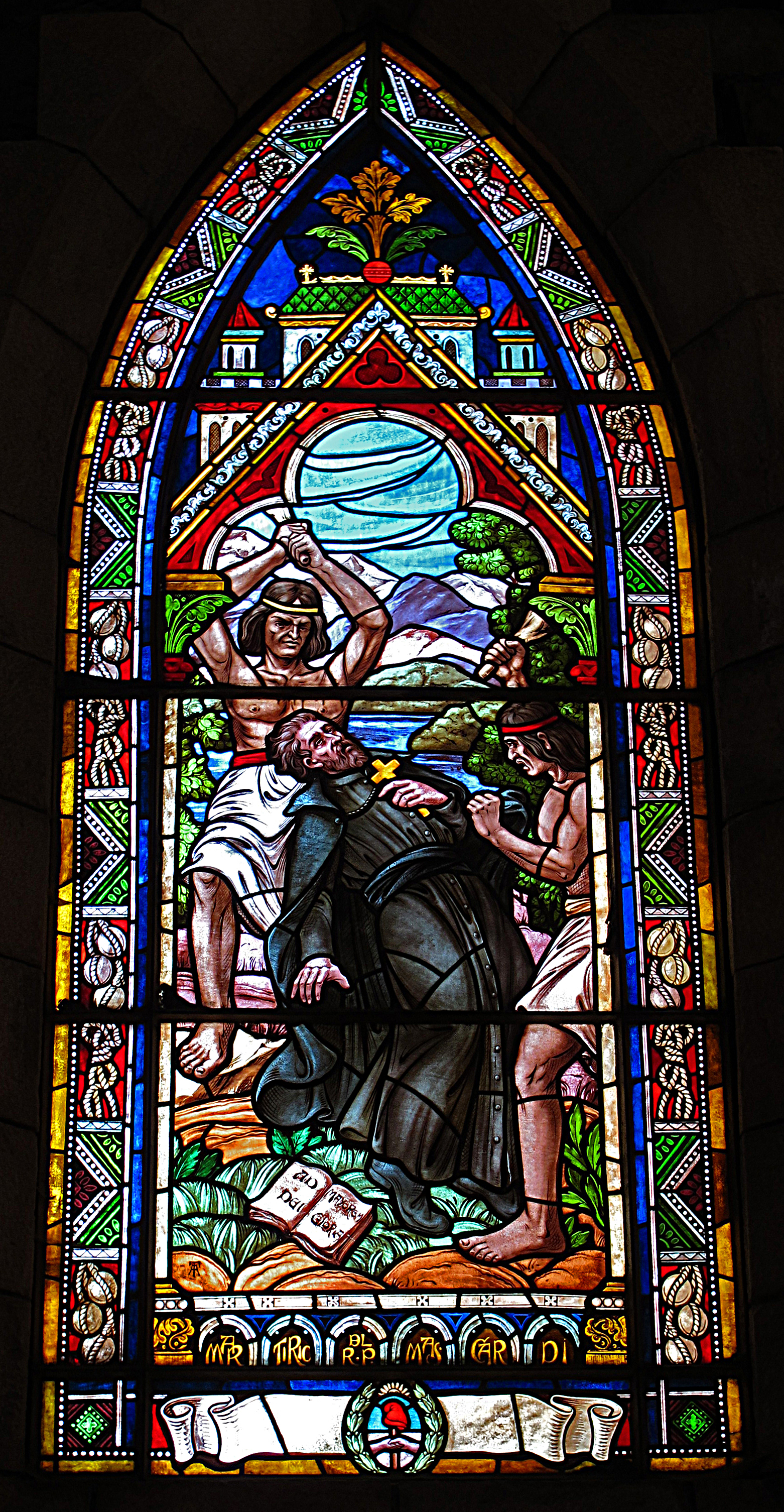
Nicolás Mascardi's martyrdom depicted in the Cathedral of Bariloche

Nicolás Mascardi (Spanish pronunciation: [nikoˈlas masˈkaɾði]; Rome, 1625 – † Patagonia, 1673) was a Ligurian Jesuit priest and missionary in South America in the 17th century. He arrived to Chile in 1651. While active in Araucanía he gained notoriety for the exorcisms he practised among the Mapuches.

In 1662 Mascardi went on an expedition south of Chiloé Archipelago, where Jesuits had been established for about fifty years, arriving to Guaitecas Archipelago where he built a church.

In 1669 he crossed the Andes from Chiloé Archipelago and established a mission on the shores of Nahuel Huapi Lake which lasted until his death. From the mission he and his fellow Jesuits engaged in missionary activity among the Poyas, Pehuenches and Puelches. He died in 1673 after being attacked by native Poyas during one of his exploration trips in the southern Andes. Villa Mascardi and Mascardi Lake in present-day Argentina are named after him.

== Bibliography ==
- Broggio, Paolo (2008). "MASCARDI, Niccolò". Dizionario Biografico degli Italiani (in Italian). Vol. 71: Marsilli–Massimino da Salerno. Rome: Istituto dell'Enciclopedia Italiana. ISBN 978-88-12-00032-6.
- Biedma, Juan Martín, Crónica histórica del Lago Nahuel Huapi, Ed. Del Nuevo Extremo – Caleuche, Bariloche, 2003.
- Furlong, Guillermo, Entre los tehuelches de la Patagonia, Ed. San Pablo, Bs. As., 1943.
