= Villa Mascardi =

Coordinates: 41°21′S 71°31′W

- Municipality and village
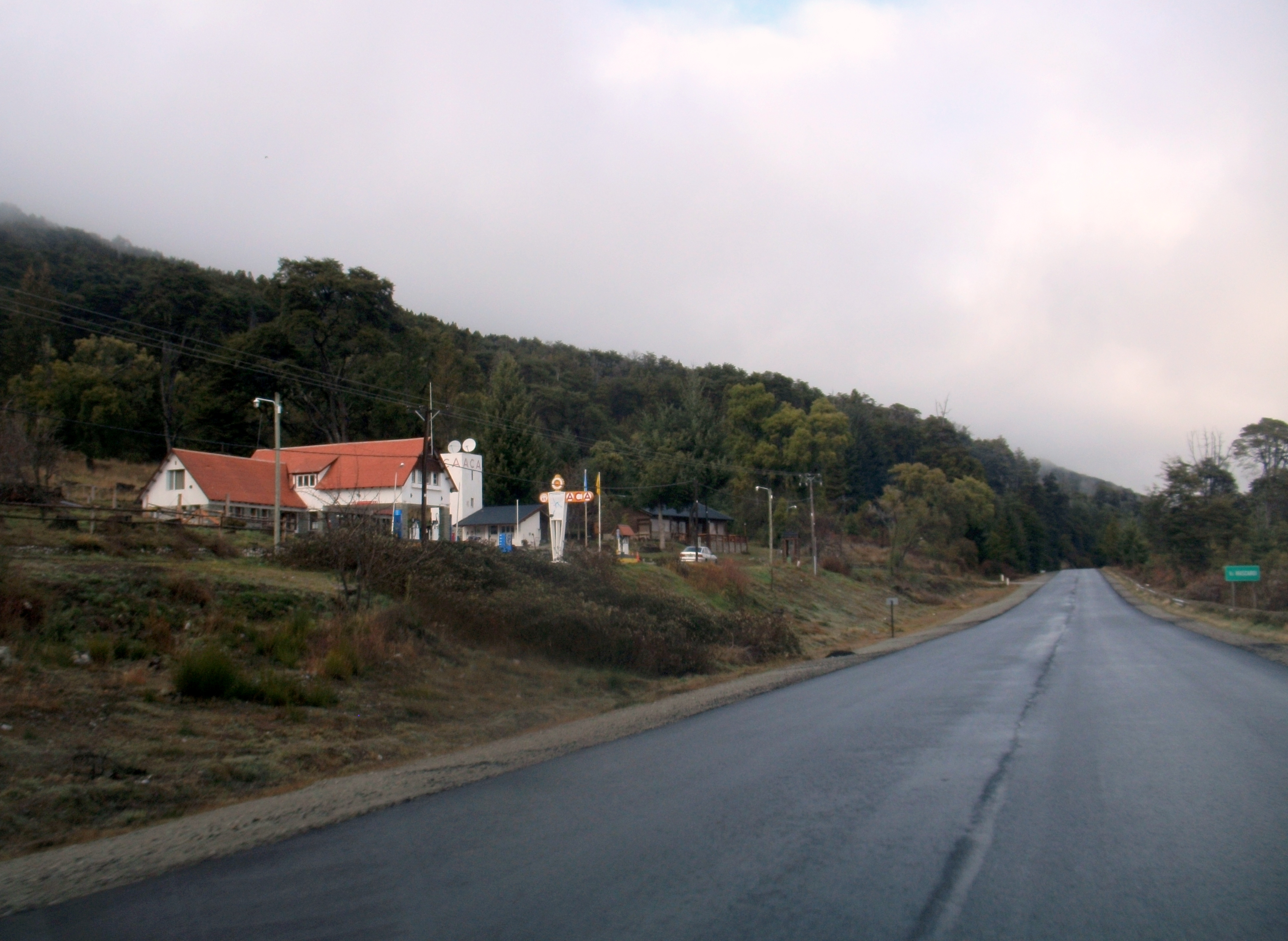
- ACA station on route through Villa Mascardi
- Interactive map of Villa Mascardi
- Country: Argentina
- Province: Río Negro Province
- Time zone: UTC−3 (ART)

Villa Mascardi is a village and municipality in Río Negro Province in Argentina. It is named after the 17th century Jesuit Nicolás Mascardi who was active in the Nahuel Huapi area. Villa Mascardi lies at the shores of Mascardi Lake.
