= Poya people =

Indigenous people of Argentina

The Poya were a subgroup of Indigenous Tehuelche people living in the Andes of Llanquihue and Palena Province as well as on the southern shores of Nahuel Huapi Lake in present-day Argentina. In the 17th century, the Jesuit priest Nicolás Mascardi divided the Poya language into two linguistically distinct groups: the one spoken by the "comarcanos" of Nahuelhuapi and another one spoken further east, reaching to the coast of the Atlantic Ocean.
