= Mascardi Lake =

Lake in northern Patagonia

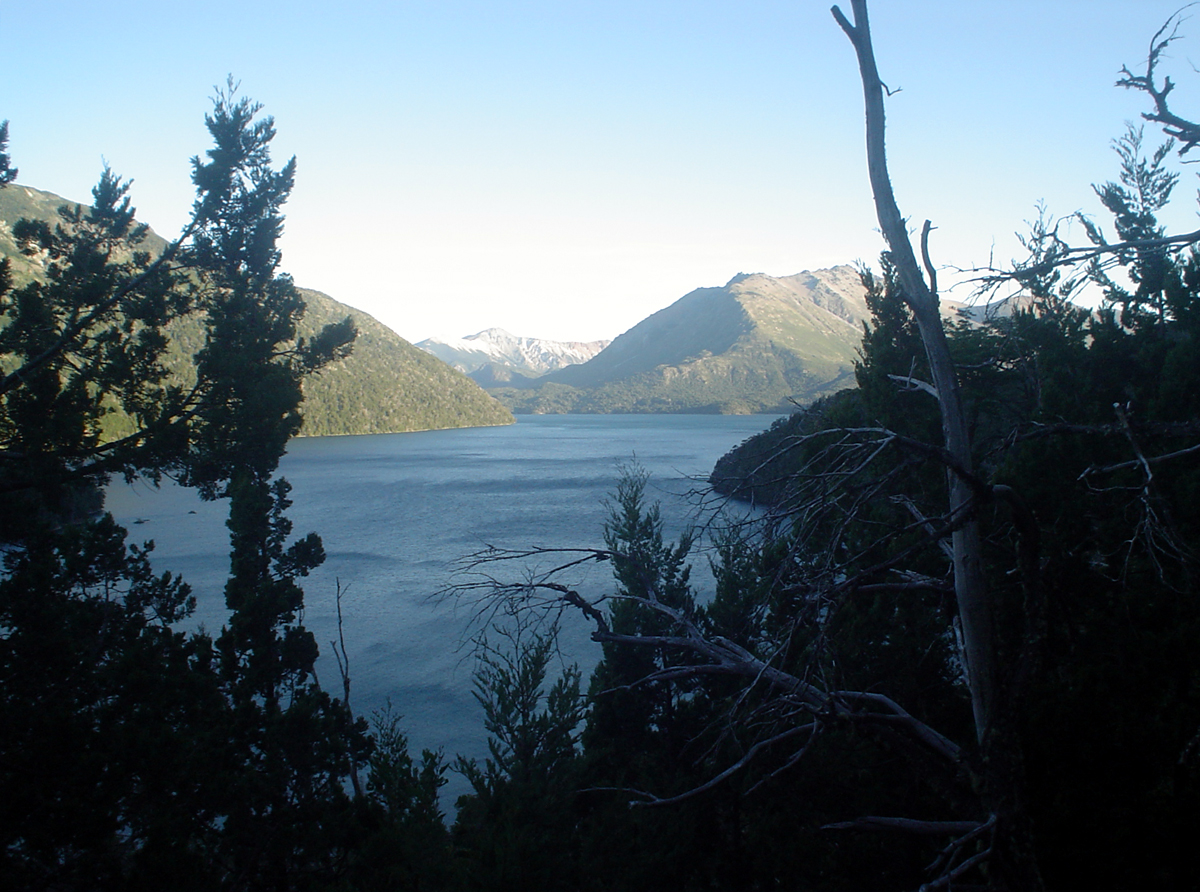

- Location within Argentina
- Location: Bariloche Department, Río Negro Province, Argentina, in Patagonia
- Coordinates: 41°20′54″S 71°33′49″W
- Primary inflows: Manso River
- Primary outflows: Manso River
- Basin countries: Argentina
- Max. length: 15 kilometres (9.3 mi)
- Max. width: 2.5 kilometres (1.6 mi)
- Surface area: 39.2 square kilometres (15.1 sq mi)
- Average depth: 111 metres (364 ft)
- Max. depth: 218 metres (715 ft)
- Water volume: 4.35 cubic kilometres (3,530,000 acre⋅ft)
- Residence time: 3.72 years
- Surface elevation: 750 metres (2,460 ft)
- Settlements: Villa Mascardi

Mascardi Lake (Spanish: Lago Mascardi, Spanish pronunciation: [ˈlaɣo masˈkaɾði]) is in the lake region of northern Patagonia in Río Negro Province of Argentina. The lake is near the resort city of Bariloche and is within the Nahuel Huapi National Park. The lake, of glacial origin, is named after Nicolás Mascardi, a 17th-century Jesuit who was a missionary in the area.

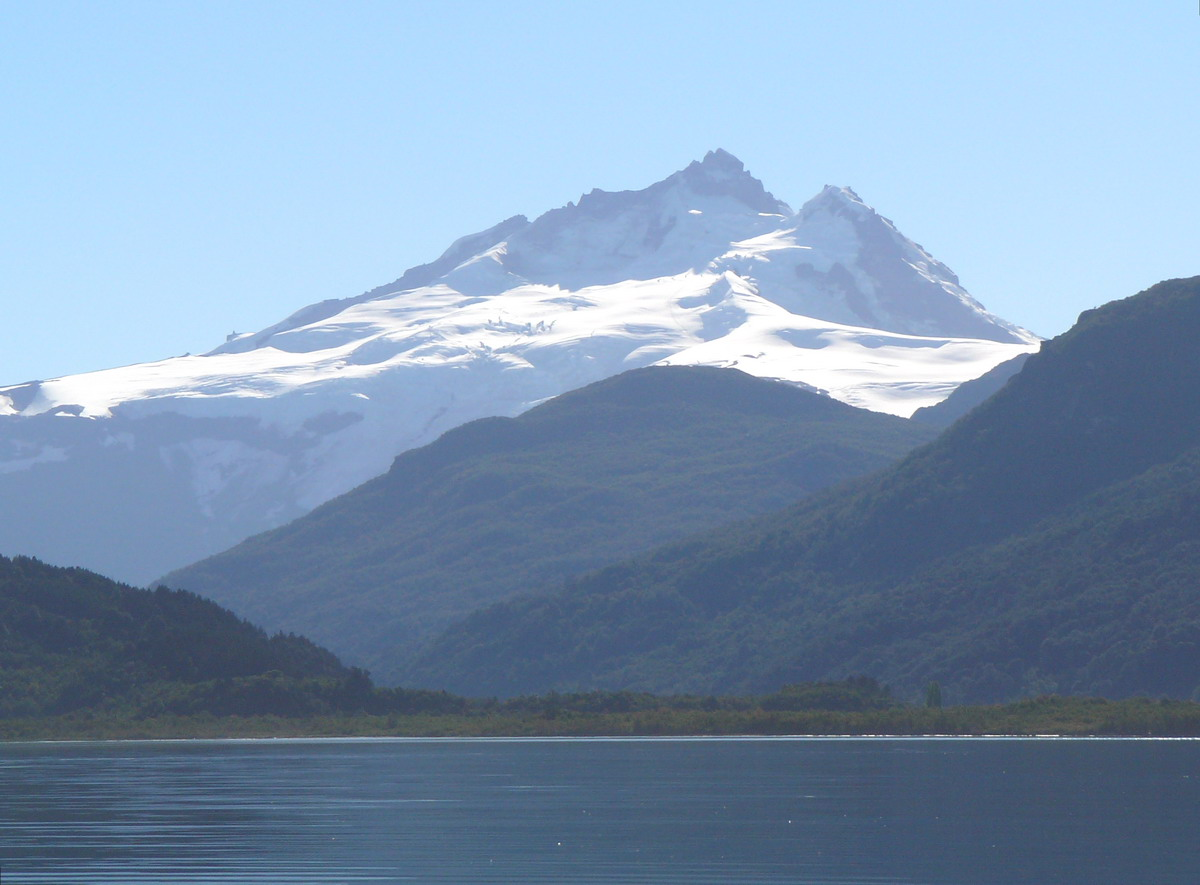
Tronador stratovolcano looms over one arm of the lake.

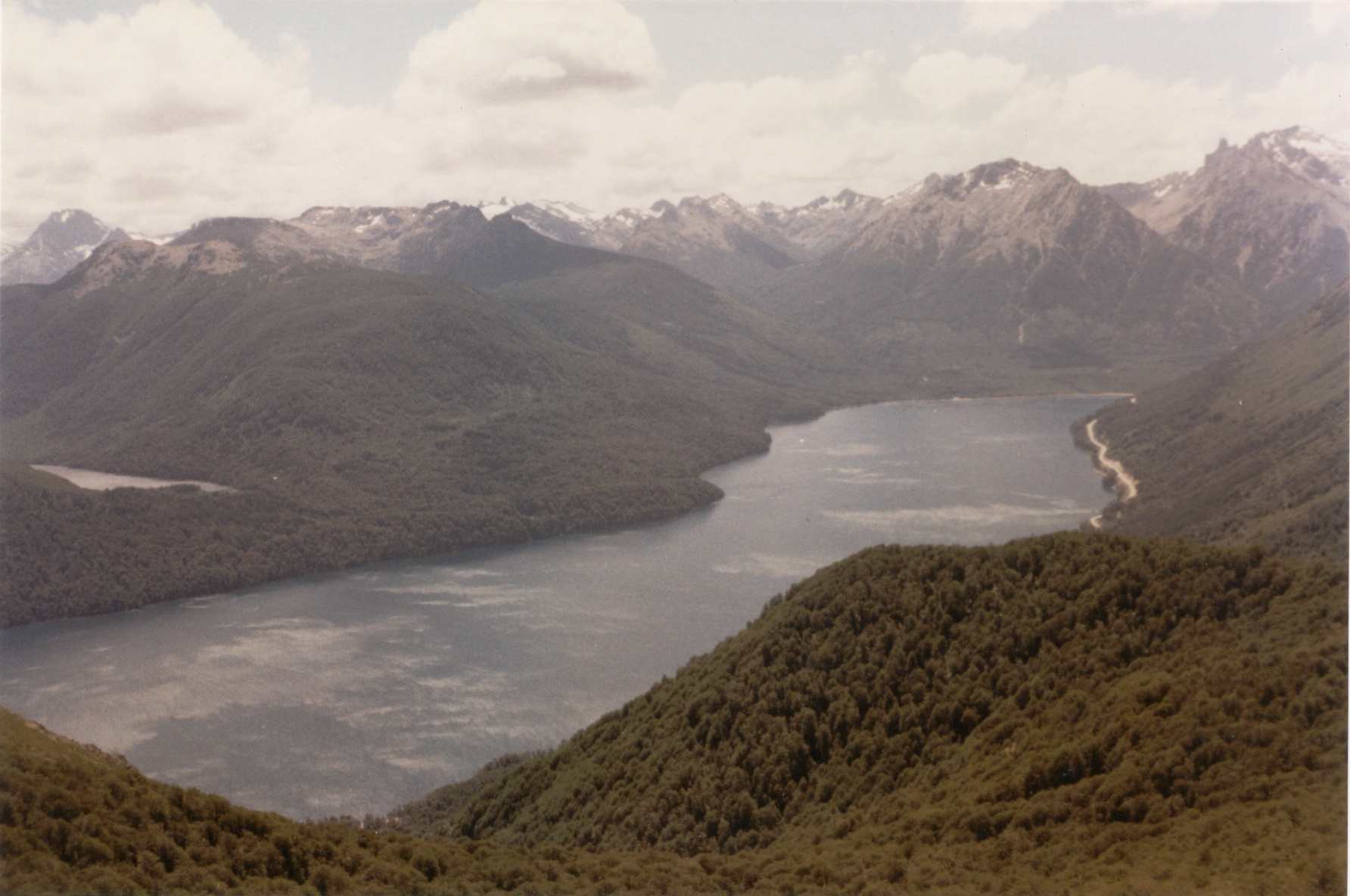
The road along Catedral arm. The small lake is Lake Llum.

== Description ==
Mascardi Lake is V-shaped with two arms roughly equal in length and width. The eastern arm is called the Catedral (Cathedral) arm and the western arm is called the Tronador arm, named after the volcano on the border with Chile which is the highest and most prominent mountain in the area. The lake is surrounded by mountains rising steeply from the lake to elevations of more than 1,800 metres (5,900 ft). The mountains are snow-capped most of the year. Timberline on the mountains is above 1,600 metres (5,200 ft). The lake has a maximum depth of 218 metres (715 ft) and a surface area of 39.2 square kilometres (9,700 acres)

The primary inflow into Mascardi Lake is the Manso River which emerges from a small lake fed by a glacier called the Ventisquero Negro (literally "black snowfield"), on the slopes of Tronador mountain about 20 kilometres (12 mi) west of the lake. The Manso emerges from the southwestern corner lake via a short, turbulent passage called "Los Rapidos" (The Rapids) which leads to the Las Moscas Lake, the next in a chain of lakes along the Manso River.

The lake lies next to Gutiérrez Lake. The gravel plain that separates them lies along the continental divide, with Mascardi Lake draining to the Pacific and Gutiérrez Lake to the Atlantic.

A paved highway (National Route 40) extends down the eastern arm of the lake to the southern shore where a small community called Villa Mascardi is located. From there a road (unpaved in 2018) named Route 82 follows the western arm of the lake northward and continues on to Ventisquero Negro.

== Recreation ==
Kayaking and fishing are popular on Mascardi Lake with a number of tourist agencies in Bariloche offering guided tours. Species sought by fishermen are rainbow, brown, and brook trout, none of them native to Argentina. A number of campgrounds and lodging places are found along the roads that encircle one-half the lake. One of the campgrounds on the northernmost part of the Catedral arm is owned by a community of Mapuche people who were the principal occupants of this area from the 17th until the late 19th century.

A hiking trail, a section of the long-distance Huella Andina trail, leads 19.5 kilometres (12.1 mi) south to Lake Steffen. The trail is rated moderate in difficulty.
