= Manso River (Argentina and Chile) =

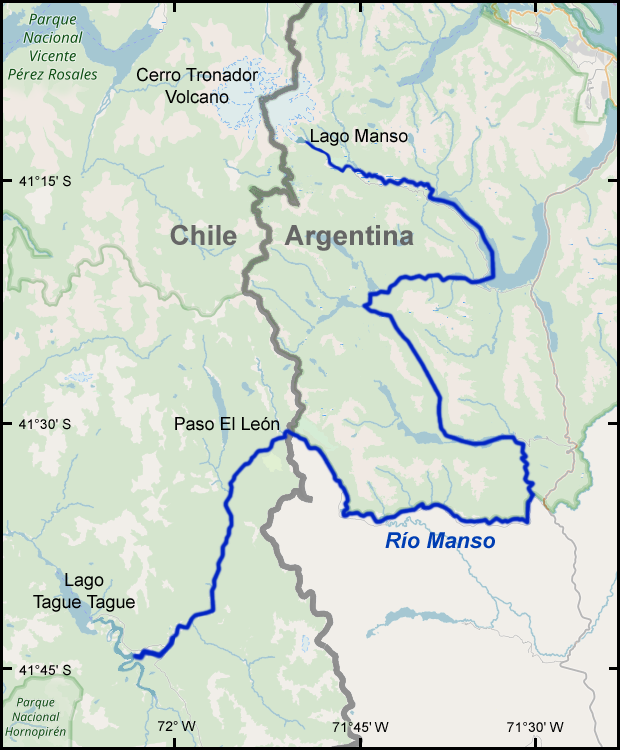
- Course of the Manso River

Location
- Countries: Argentina; Chile

The Manso River is a river of Rio Negro Province of Argentina and Los Lagos Region of Chile, both part of Patagonia. The Manso River is located in the Andes. It follows a winding route through snow-capped mountains and connects many glacial lakes. The Manso flows generally southward until its confluence with the Puelo River in Chile. The river while in Argentina flows through the Nahuel Huapi National Park. Most of the southern part of Nahuel Huapi is in the drainage basin of the Manso River.

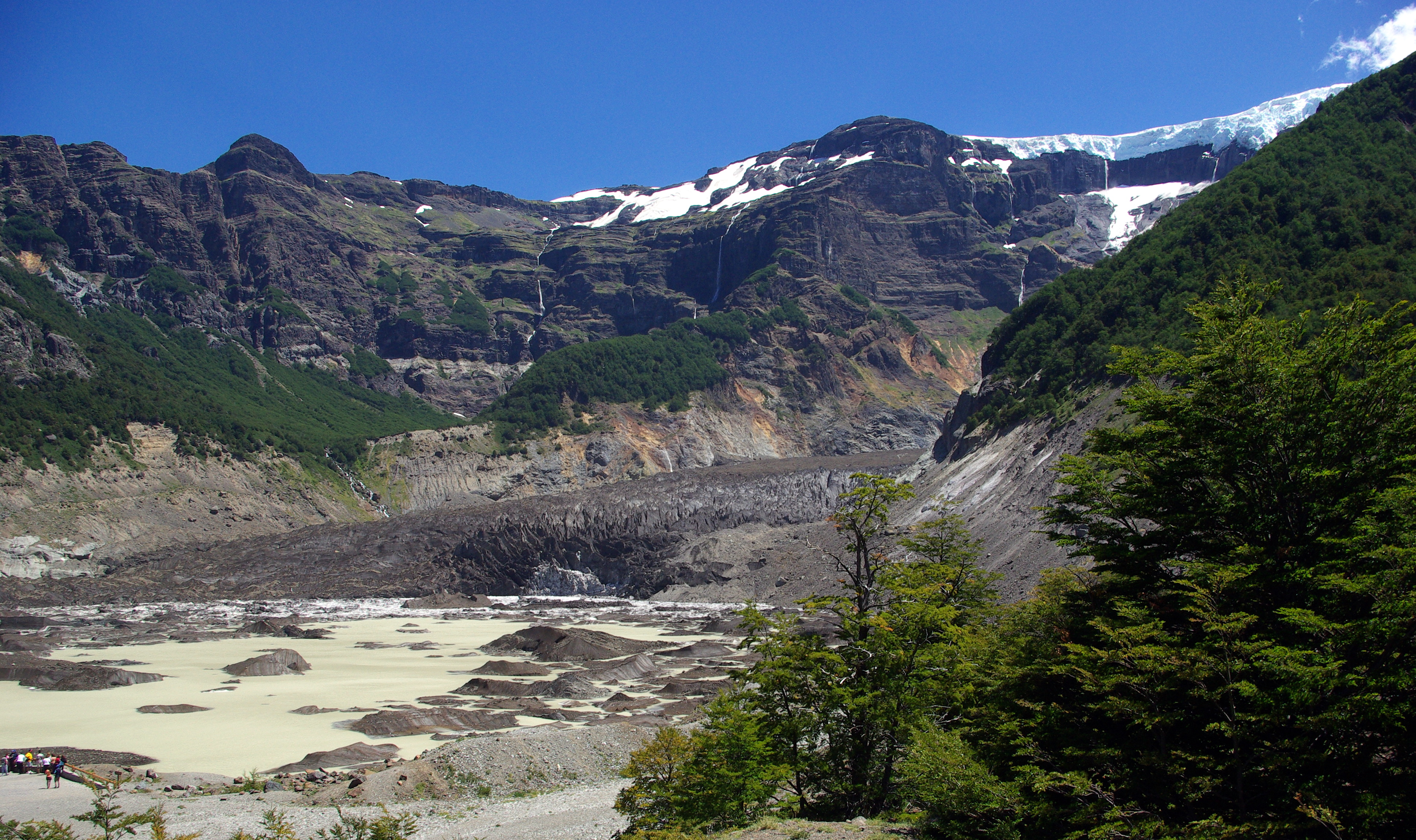
The Manso River rises on the eastern flanks of Mount Tronador in Lake Manso below the Ventisquero Negro (literally "black snowfield", but actually a glacier).

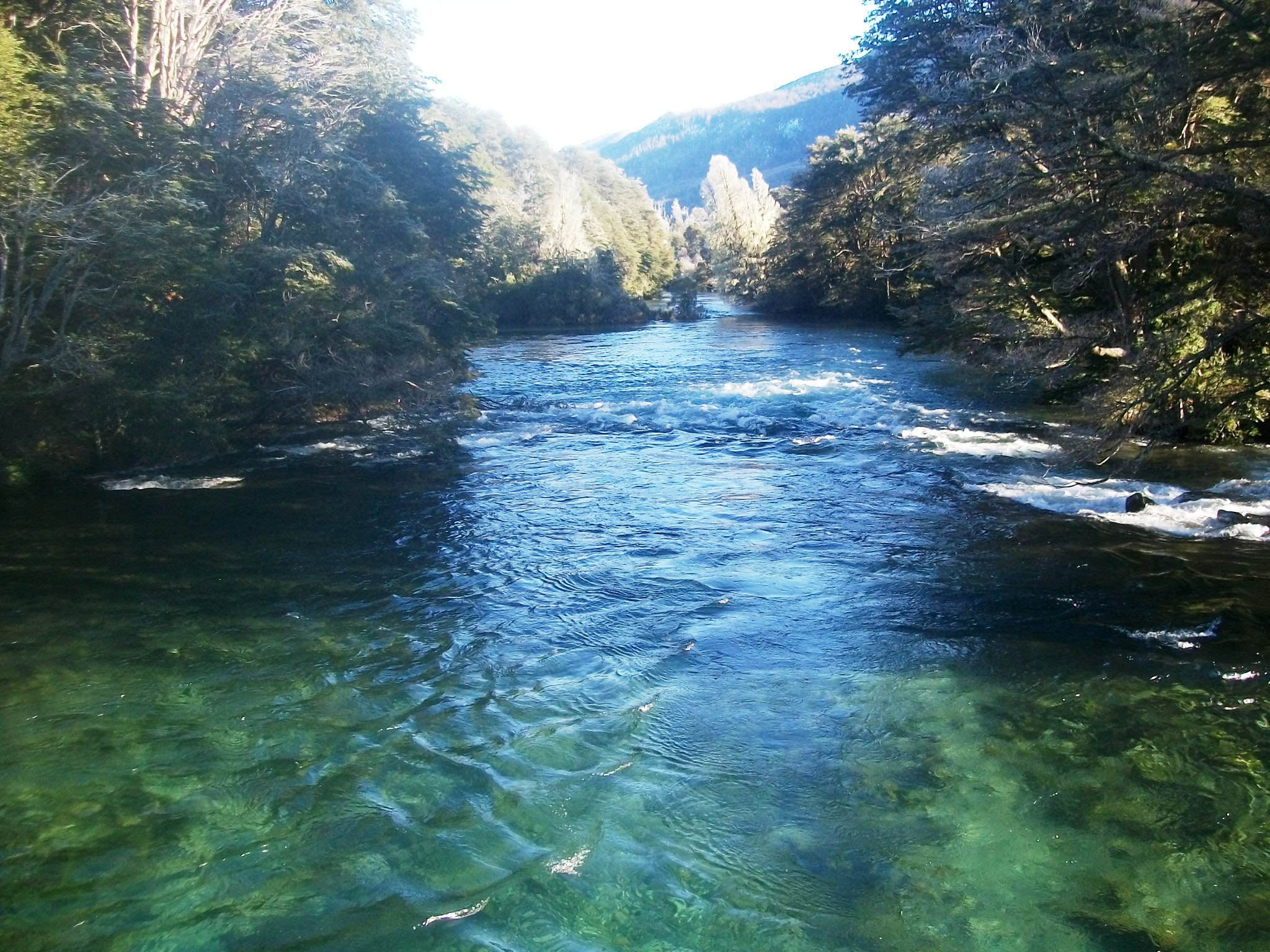
The Manso River between Mascardi Lake and Laguna las Moscas, Argentina

== Description ==
The Manso River arises at elevation of 1,000 metres (3,300 ft) in the small lake fed by the Ventisquero Negro glacier. The river flows about 10 kilometres (6.2 mi) eastward to Mascardi Lake. From Lake Mascardi the river passes through or by a chain of lakes separated by short passages of often turbulent river. The lakes include Las Moscas, Hess, Roca, Franck, Martin, and Steffen. A road (unpaved in 2015) runs along the eastern and south shore of Mascardi Lake and continues downstream for another 10 kilometres (6.2 mi), ending near Lago Hess. The river then runs through a roadless area until reaching the lower end of Lake Steffen, where a road rejoins the river. Lake Steffen is the last lake in the chain and the Manso continues its path through Argentina and into Chile. About 35 kilometres (22 mi) after entering Chile the Manso joins the Puelo River.

== Recreation ==
The Manso River is popular for whitewater rafting, especially in its course below Steffen Lake to the border with Chile. The character of the river ranges from "peaceful"—the meaning of the word "manso" in Spanish—to Class IV rapids. Sport fishing for the introduced species of brown, rainbow and brook trout in the river and its lakes is also popular. Many tourist agencies in the city of Bariloche offer rafting and fishing excursions. A portion of the long-distance Huella Andina trail passes near the river and the lakes that dot its course.

== Location ==
Point	Coordinates (links to map & photo sources)	Notes
Lake Manso source	41.20556°S 71.83056°W	
Paso El León border crossing	41.508°S 71.850°W	
Rio Puelo confluence	41.733°S 72.067°W	

== See also ==
- List of rivers of Argentina
- List of rivers of Chile
