= Cerro Volcánico =

Mountain in Argentina

Highest point
- Elevation: 1,930 m (6,330 ft)
- Coordinates: 41°19′S 71°50′W

Geography
- Location: Argentina
- Parent range: Andes

Geology
- Rock age: Holocene ?
- Mountain type: Cinder cone
- Last eruption: 70,000–14,000 yrs ago

Cerro Volcánico (also known as Fonck) is a cinder cone in Argentina, located southeast of the massive stratovolcano of Tronador. The cone produced a single andesite lava flow, which has been bracketed in age between 70,000 and 14,000 years ago.

== Sources ==
- "Tronador". Global Volcanism Program. Smithsonian Institution.

== See also ==
- List of volcanoes in Argentina
- El Bolsón, Río Negro
- El Bolsón Airport
