= EHL =

Ehl or EHL may refer to:

== People ==
- Klaus Ehl (born 1949), German athlete

== Science ==
- Elastohydrodynamic Lubrication, a special regime of fluid lubrication

== Sport ==
- Eastern Hockey League (1933–1973), a defunct American ice hockey league
- Eastern Hockey League (1978–1981), a defunct American ice hockey league
- Eastern Hockey League (2013–), an American junior ice hockey league
- EliteHockey Ligaen, the top level Norwegian ice hockey league
- Emirates Ice Hockey League
- Men's England Hockey League
- Women's England Hockey League
- Euro Hockey League, the top level field hockey competition for European clubs
- European Hockey League, a defunct European ice hockey club competition

== Other uses ==
- Ehl, Bas-Rhin, France
- Eastern Housing Limited, a Bangladeshi real estate company
- École hôtelière de Lausanne, a Swiss hospitality management school
- El Bolsón Airport, in Argentina
- Equal housing lender
- European Heritage Label
- Evolution of Human Languages, a research projected hosted by the Santa Fe Institute
- Extensor hallucis longus muscle
- "East of Harvey Lock", a location reference on the Gulf Intracoastal Waterway
