= Club Andino Bariloche =

Argentine mountaineering organization

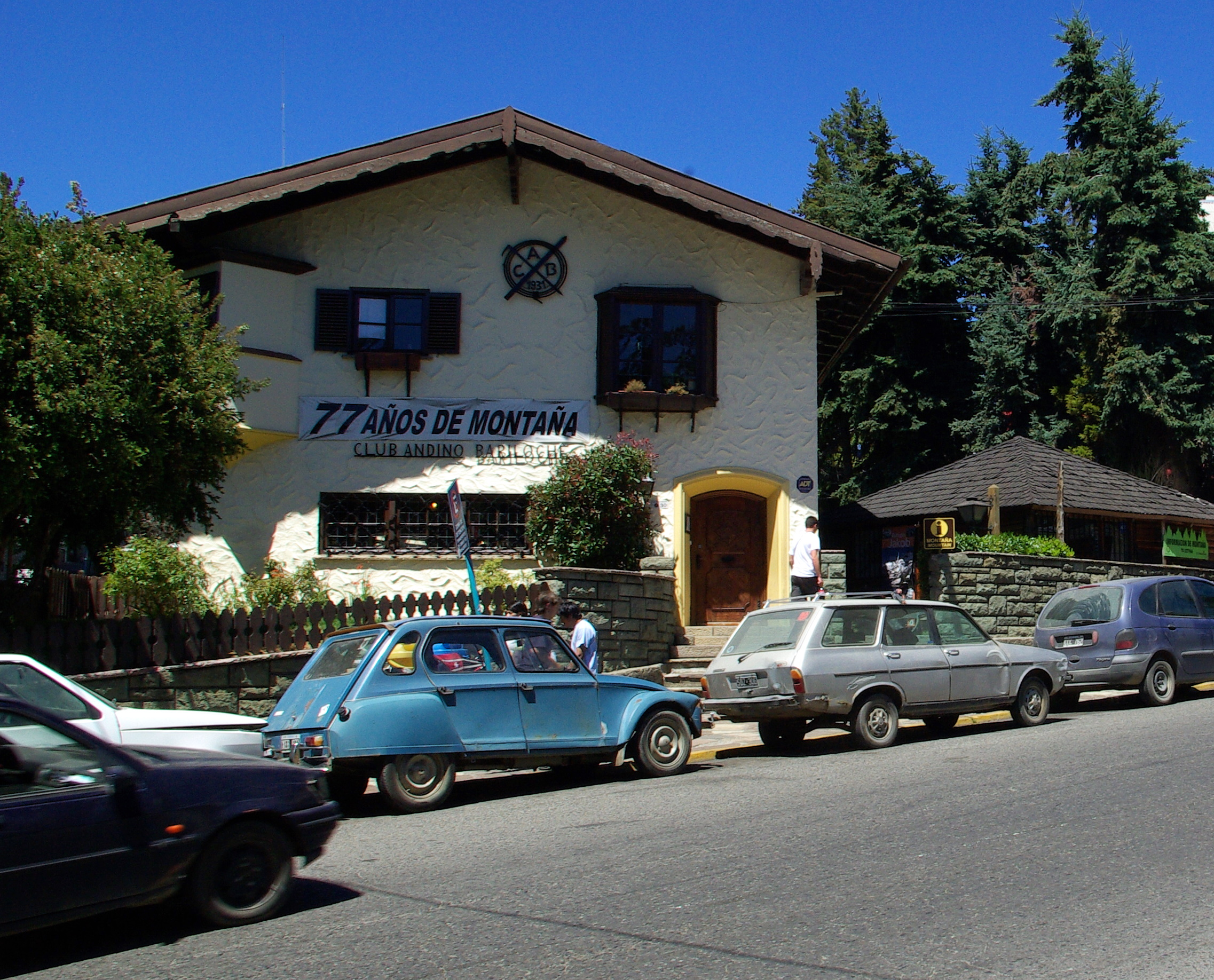
The club's headquarters in Bariloche.

Club Andino Bariloche is a mountaineering organisation based in San Carlos de Bariloche, in the Argentine Andes. It was founded on the 13th of August 1931 by Otto Meiling, Emilio Frey, Juan Javier Neumeyer and Reinaldo Knapp, a group of friends who were exploring the region and making first ascents. Emilio Frey became its first president and continued in this role during 30 years.

The club was responsible for the construction and running of a number of mountain huts in the area. Throughout its history, it has organised and funded a large number of expeditions, including many ambitious first ascents throughout the Andes. It also maintains a local mountain rescue agency, the Club Andino Bariloche Relief Commission.

== Huts ==
Huts run by the club are as follows:

- Refugio Emilio Frey.
- Refugio Reynaldo Knapp.
- Refugio Cerro López.
- Vivac Velco.
- Refugio San Martín (o Jakob).
- Refugio Tronador Viejo.
- Laguna Ilón - Vivac Papa Manuel
- Refugio Manfredo Segre. (Laguna Negra)
- Refugio Berghof. (Cerro Otto)
- Refugio Otto Meiling. (Mount Tronador)
- Refugio Neumeyer.
