= Liberty Bell Bank =

Bank in New Jersey, United States

Liberty Bell Bank is a Federal Deposit Insurance Corporation insured bank based in Evesham, New Jersey. Liberty Bell Bank, headquartered in Marlton, NJ also has branch offices in Moorestown, NJ, and Cherry Hill, NJ. The bank offers a number of banking services, such as personal banking, personal lending, business banking, business lending, CD's, online banking with BillPay, Remote Deposit, merchant services, and loans.

Liberty Bell Bank is an FDIC insured bank and member Equal Housing Lender
