= Shoulder butt =

Shoulder butt may refer to:

- Strike (attack)#Shoulder strike
- Pork butt, pork cut from the upper part of the shoulder
- Boston butt, slightly wedge-shaped portion of the pork shoulder above the standard picnic cut
- Shoulder stock of a rifle
