= Otto Meiling =

German mountain climber (1902–1989)

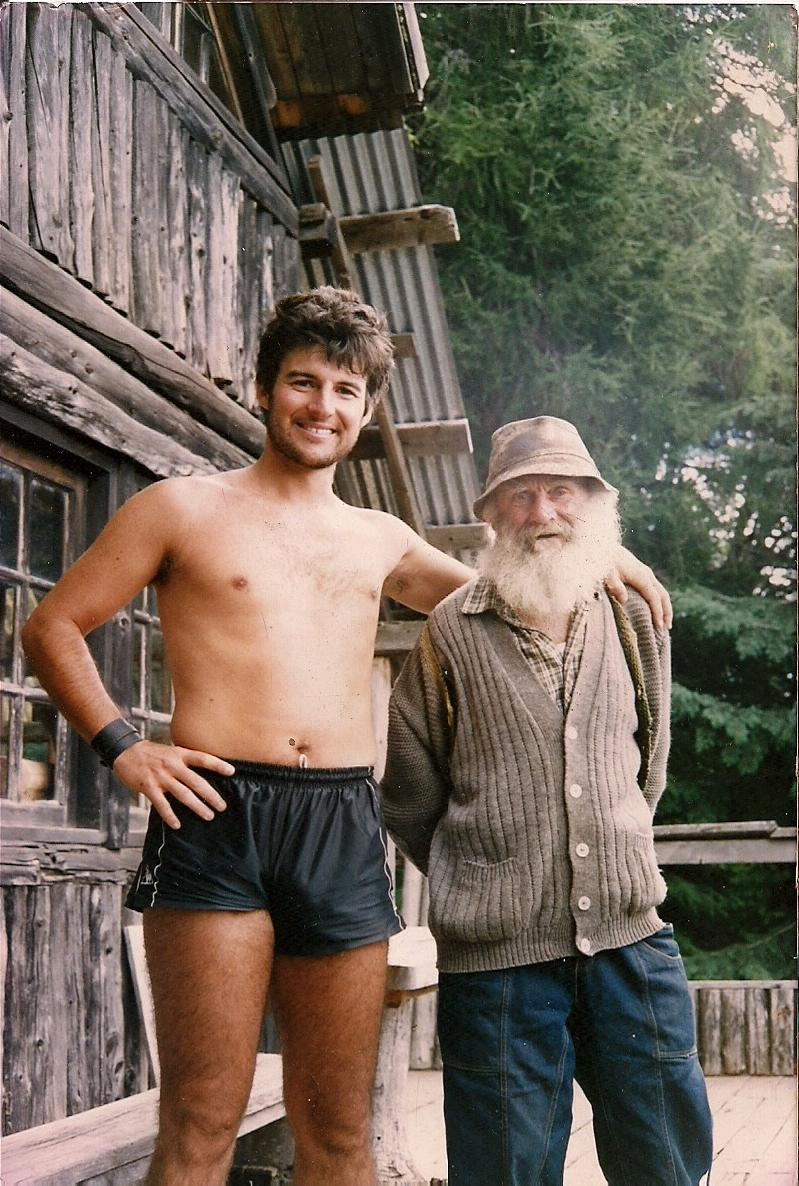
- Otto Meiling (right)
- Born: 1902; Bavaria, Germany
- Died: 1989 (aged 86–87); San Carlos de Bariloche, Argentina
- Occupations: mountaineer, ski instructor, builder
- Known for: First ascents in Nahuel Huapi National Park and co-founding the Club Andino Bariloche

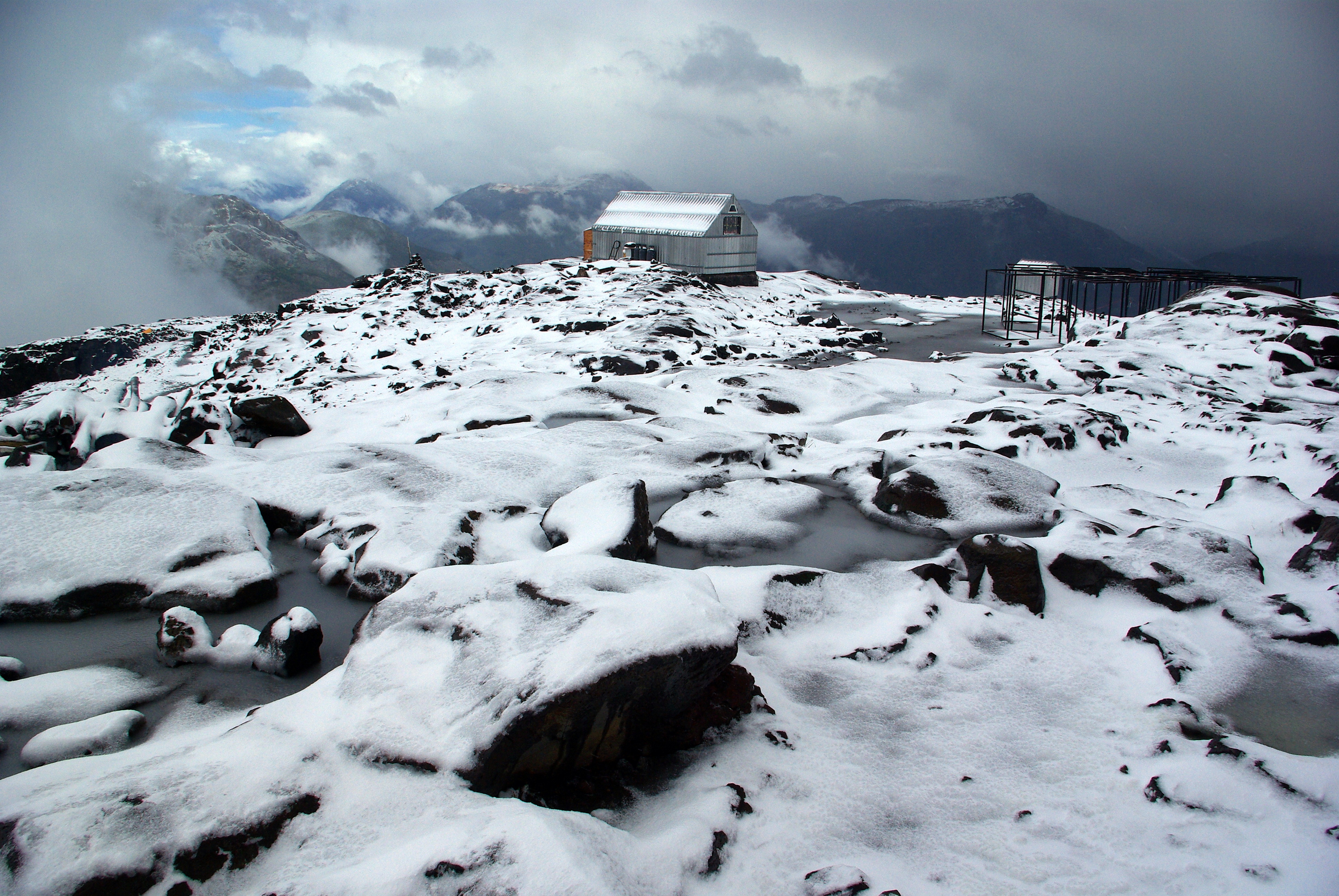
Refugio Otto Meiling, built by Meiling in the 1950s, and renamed after him in the 1970s. It is on Mount Tronador, a mountain that held a special fascination for Meiling.

Otto Meiling (1902–1989) was a German-born mountaineer who achieved many first ascents in Nahuel Huapi National Park and the surrounding area.

Meiling left Bavaria for Buenos Aires in his early twenties, working as a labourer, learning the skills of carpentry and construction. He gained a taste for adventure, then moved to San Carlos de Bariloche, at the time a small village, in the Lakes District, near Cerro Catedral. There, he began exploring the nearby peaks with friends, mainly other German immigrants. He soon founded the Club Andino de Bariloche with them, a highly successful mountaineering club that still exists.

After making a number of first ascents in the area, he was introduced to the new sport of skiing, which he became passionate about, making many long ski trips, and beginning to teach skiing, and manufacturing skis and bindings. At one point he returned to his home land, visiting his family, but also receiving further training in skiing, mountaineering, and bringing back a large supply of ski bindings.

Over the years, his exploits with the club grew bolder, including ascents of Mount Tronador, Cerro San Lorenzo, Cerro San Valentino, and later, thwarted attempts on Cerro Paine in Chile's Torres del Paine national park. However, Tronador would be his favourite mountain, with more than 15 recorded summit ascents, including a one-day ascent from and return to Pampa Linda at the age of 78. Other adventures included descending the treacherous Rio Manso, and a phenomenal 96 kilometre walk home from the end of a hike in one night.

As an active member of the club, Meiling used his construction skills to build a number of huts or "refugios" in the mountains, including the "Berghof" ski school near Cerro Otto (named after a different explorer) where he would live for most of his life. He also built a hut high up on Mount Tronador, nestled between two glaciers, which would later be renamed Refugio Otto Meiling.

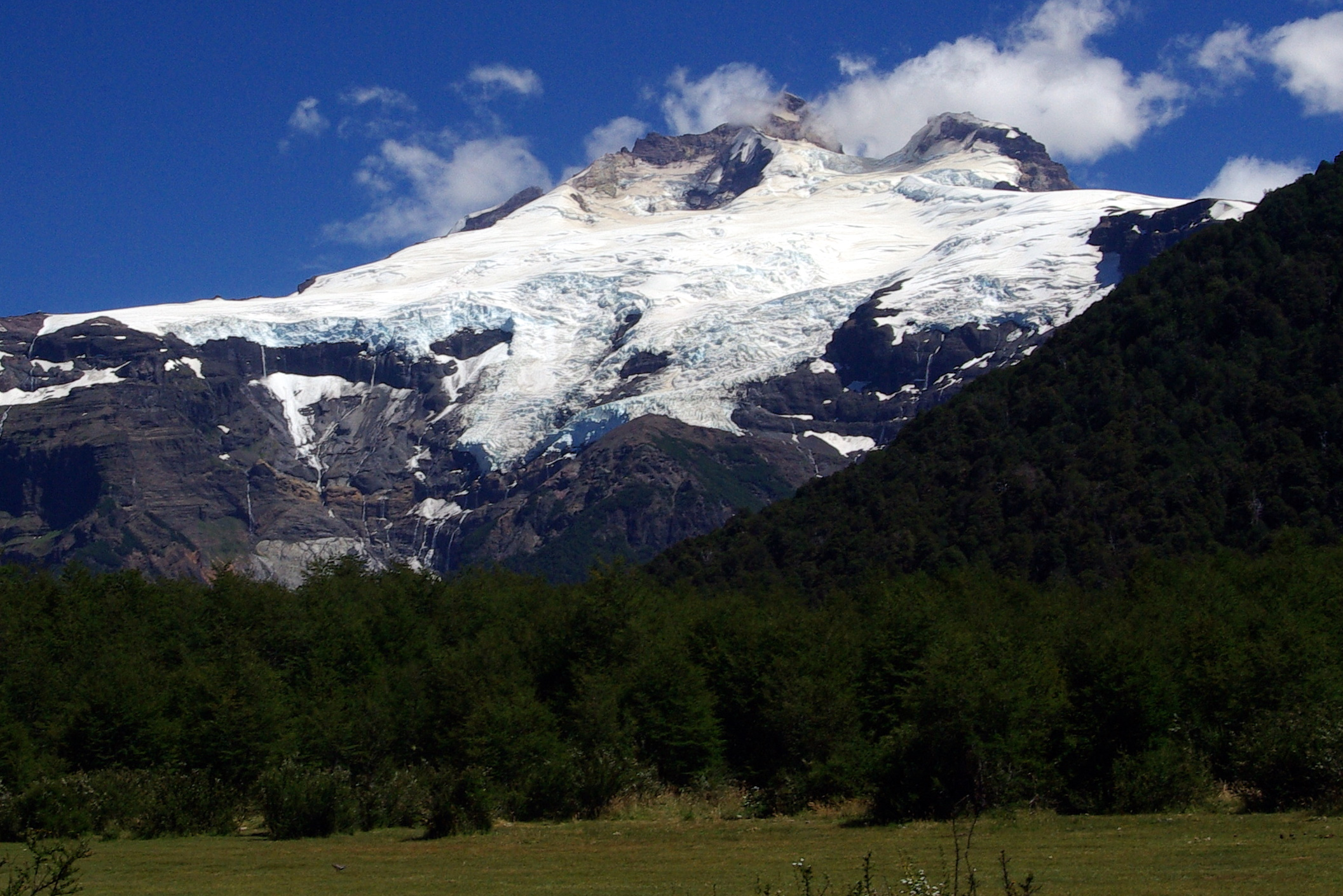
Mount Tronador, summited by Meiling 15 times.

== Later life ==
As Meiling grew older, he became something of a hermit, and gained a reputation for his uncompromising frugal ways and distaste for modern mountaineering. He was vehemently opposed to the construction of the Cerro Catedral ski resort, and when the club he founded started to orient its activities there, he became somewhat estranged from it. As a result, his lift-less ski school at Cerro Otto began to lose students, as they were attracted by the less arduous conditions at Catedral.

Throughout his life he remained in astonishing physical condition, walking long distances at high speed. One friend and later biographer remarked that it was only when hiking with Otto in his 80s that he was able to keep up with him for the first time. Meiling died in 1989, finally succumbing to a number of health problems.

== Sources ==
- Un Pionero de Bariloche, Otto Meiling: Conquistador de Cumbres y Filosofo del Cerro Otto, Vojko Arko.
