= Cerro Otto =

Mountain in Argentina

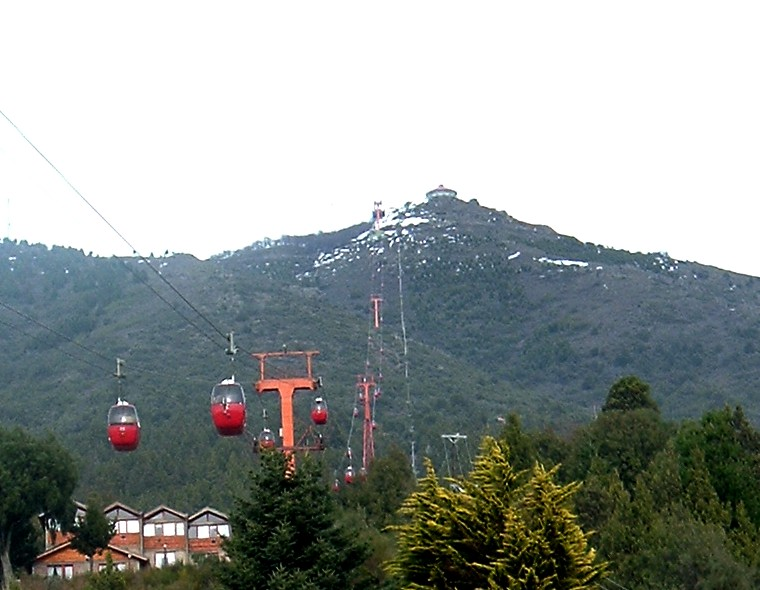
- Cerro Otto - Bariloche View of Cerro Otto mountain from Melipal, Argentina

Highest point
- Elevation: 1,405 m (4,610 ft)
- Prominence: 469 m (1,539 ft)
- Coordinates: 41°08′39″S 71°22′35″W

Naming
- English translation: Otto's Hill

Geography
- Location: San Carlos de Bariloche, Río Negro, Argentina

Cerro Otto is a mountain located 5 kilometres (3.1 mi) from San Carlos de Bariloche, and inside the Nahuel Huapí National Park, in Patagonia, Argentina.

== Etymology ==
It took its name from German pioneer Otto Goedecke, who arrived to Bariloche in 1892 and dwelled nearby.

== History ==
The summit is 1,405 m (4,610 ft) and there is a cable car which takes twelve minutes to reach the top. The mountain is 5 km (3.1 mi) west of Bariloche. There is a gravel road which allows people to bike, hike or drive the 8 km (5.0 mi) to the top. There is a restaurant that revolves on the summit. The revolving restaurant is the Giratoria confectionery, and there is also a "Refugio del cerro Otto" grill which makes bondiola sandwiches. There is a zip line which is 7 m (23 ft) above the terrain and a climbing wall.

== Description ==
Due to its prominence, Cerro Otto is notably a visual reference while navigating the city as it stands in between the neighbourhoods of San Joaquin, Los Cipresales, Las Vertientes, Los Maitenes, Melipal, El Faldeo, Parque Cerro Otto, Virgen Misionera, Peumayen (colloquially known as "the kilometers") from the North and El Frutillar, 645 Viviendas, Lomas del Cauquen, and Arelauquen Country Club from the South.

On top of the mountain a rotating cafeteria owned by the Sara María Furman Foundation is most prominent, constituting a notable lookout overlooking the city, Nahuel Huapi and Gutiérrez lakes, and the Andes.

== Gallery ==
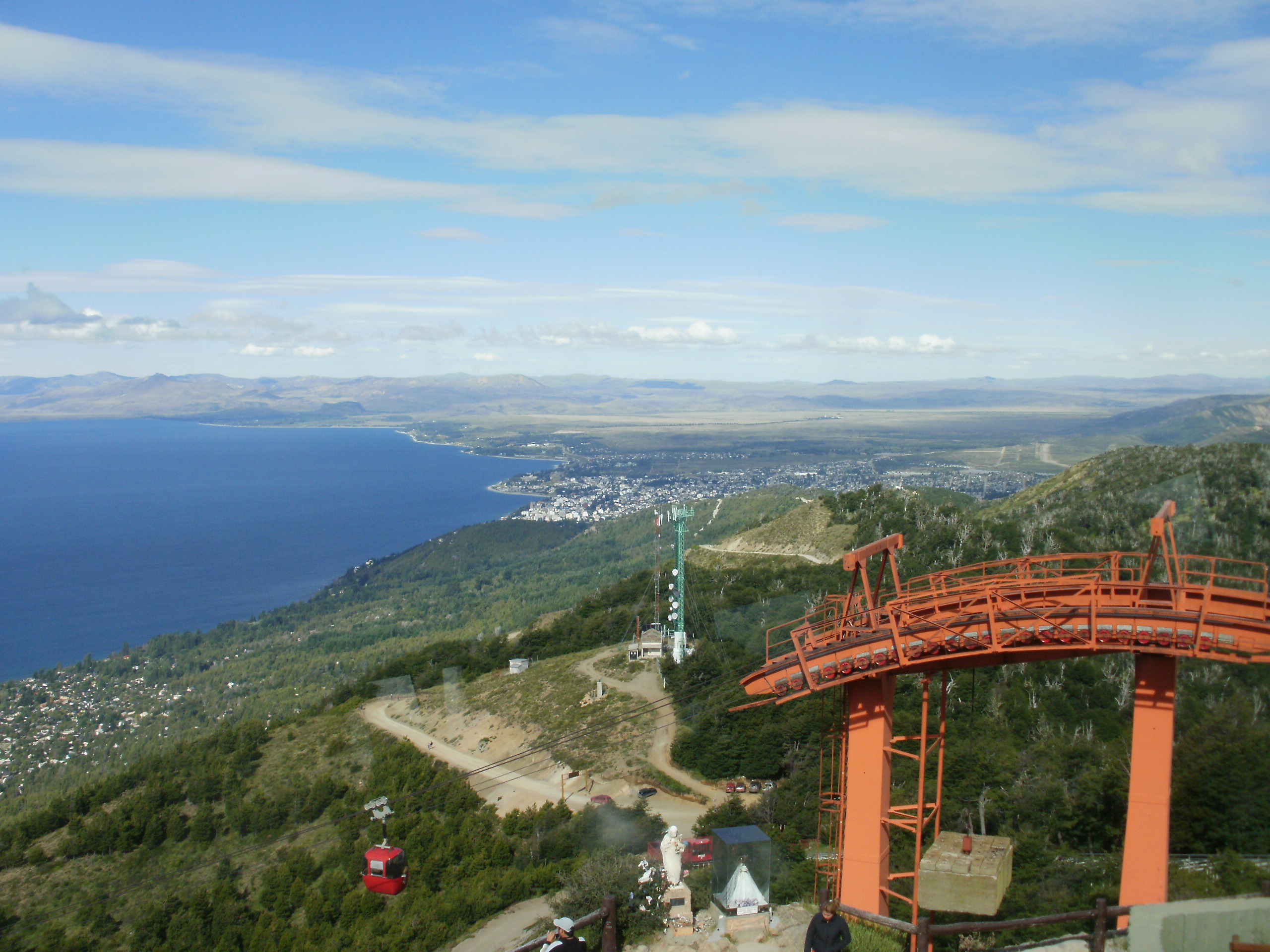
City view of Bariloche from the top of Cerro Otto

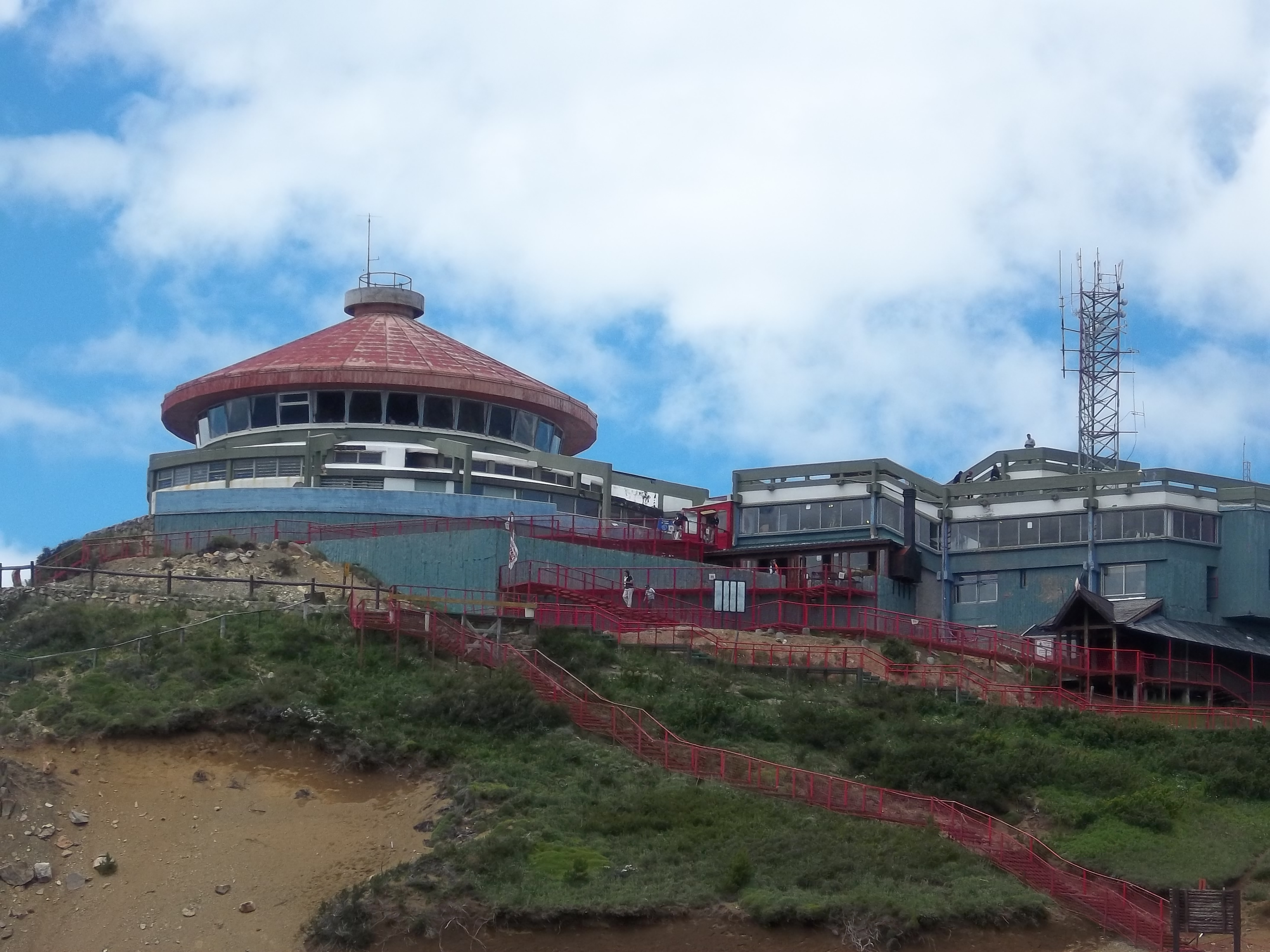
View of the rotating cafeteria on top of Cerro Otto

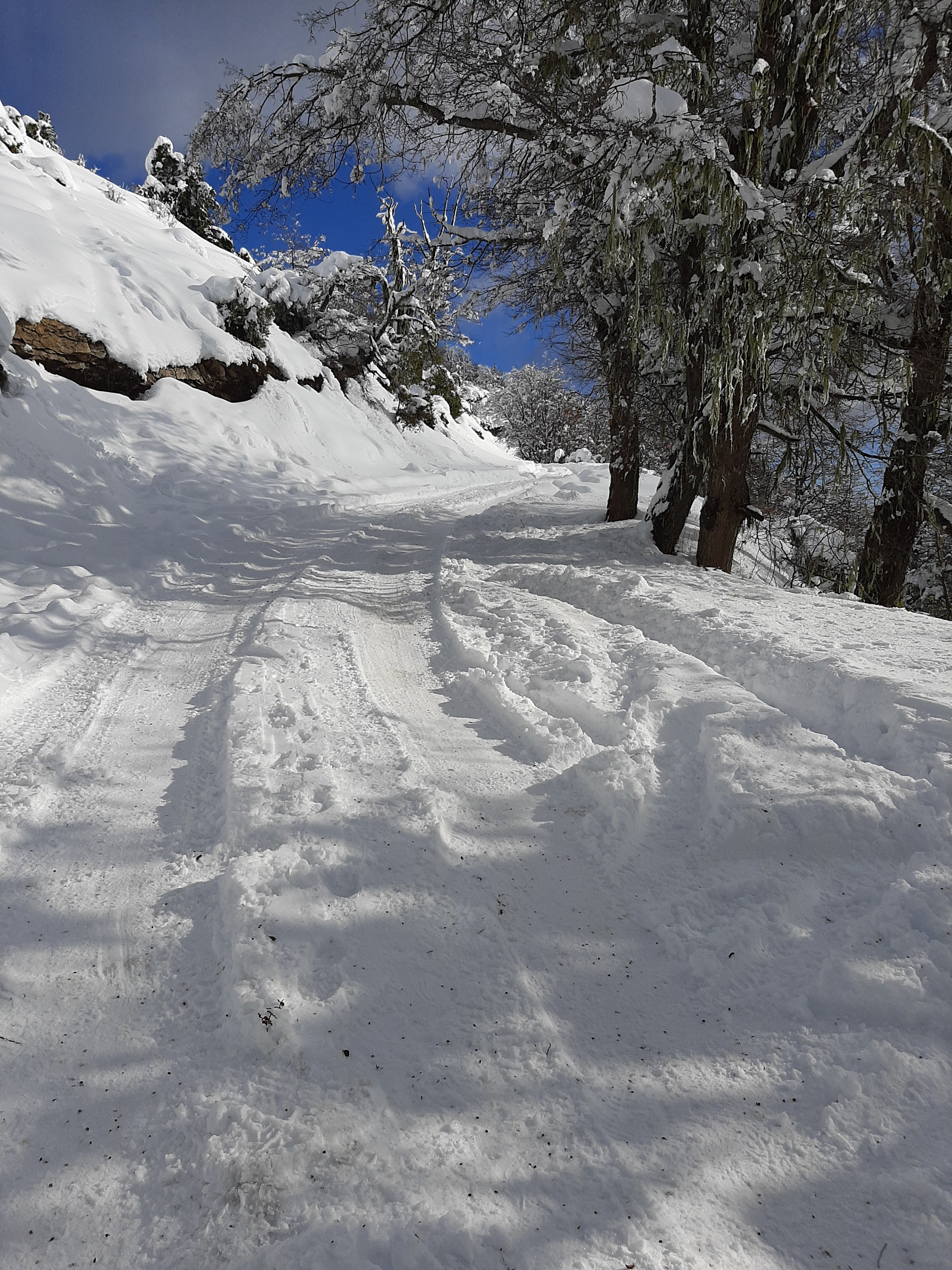
Cerro Otto trails in winter

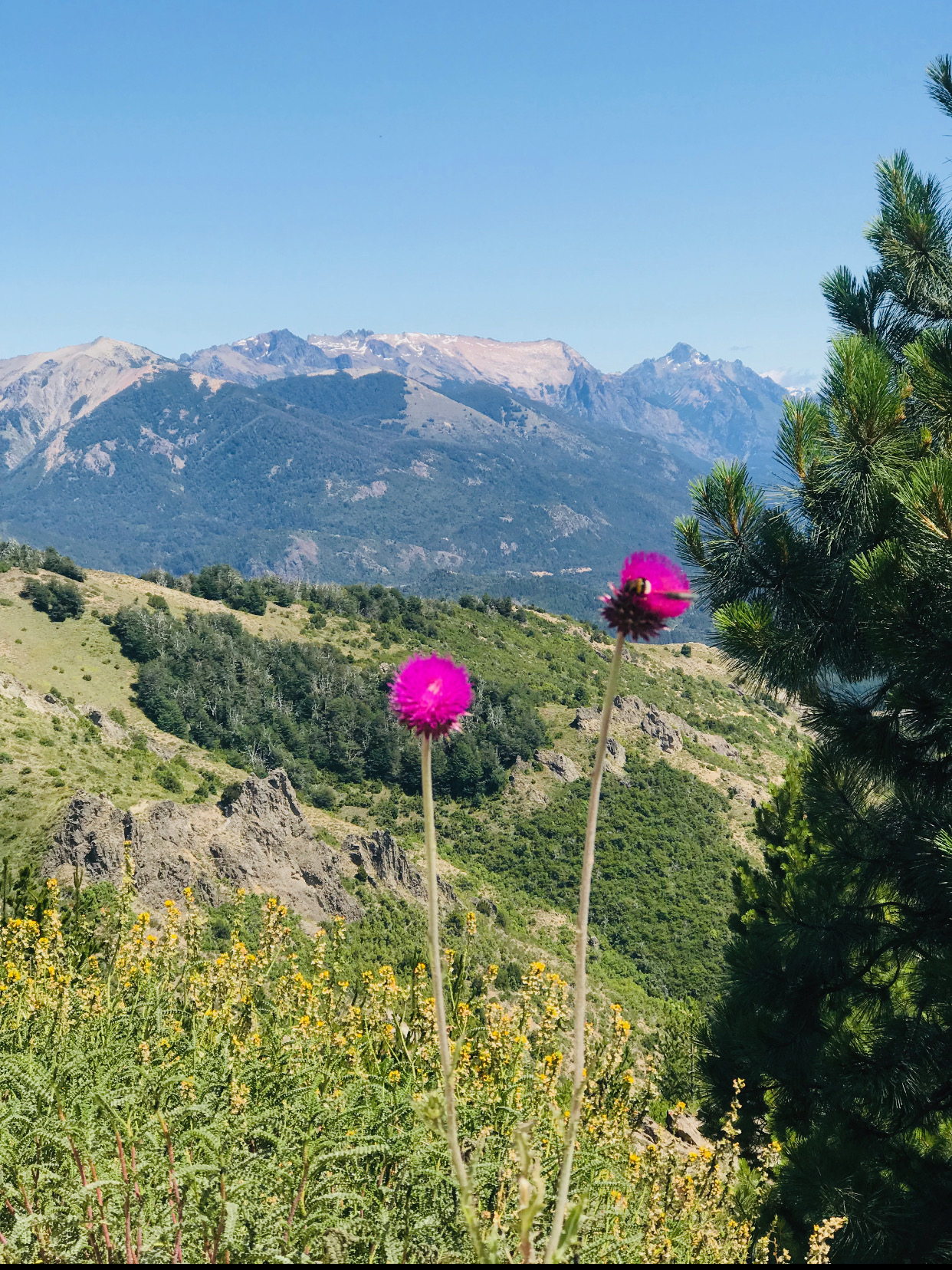
Cerro Otto trail in summer

== See also ==
- Cerro Catedral
- Cerro Campanario
- Cerro Bellavista
- Cerro Ventana
- Cerro Carbón
