= Tronador =

Mountain in Argentina and Chile

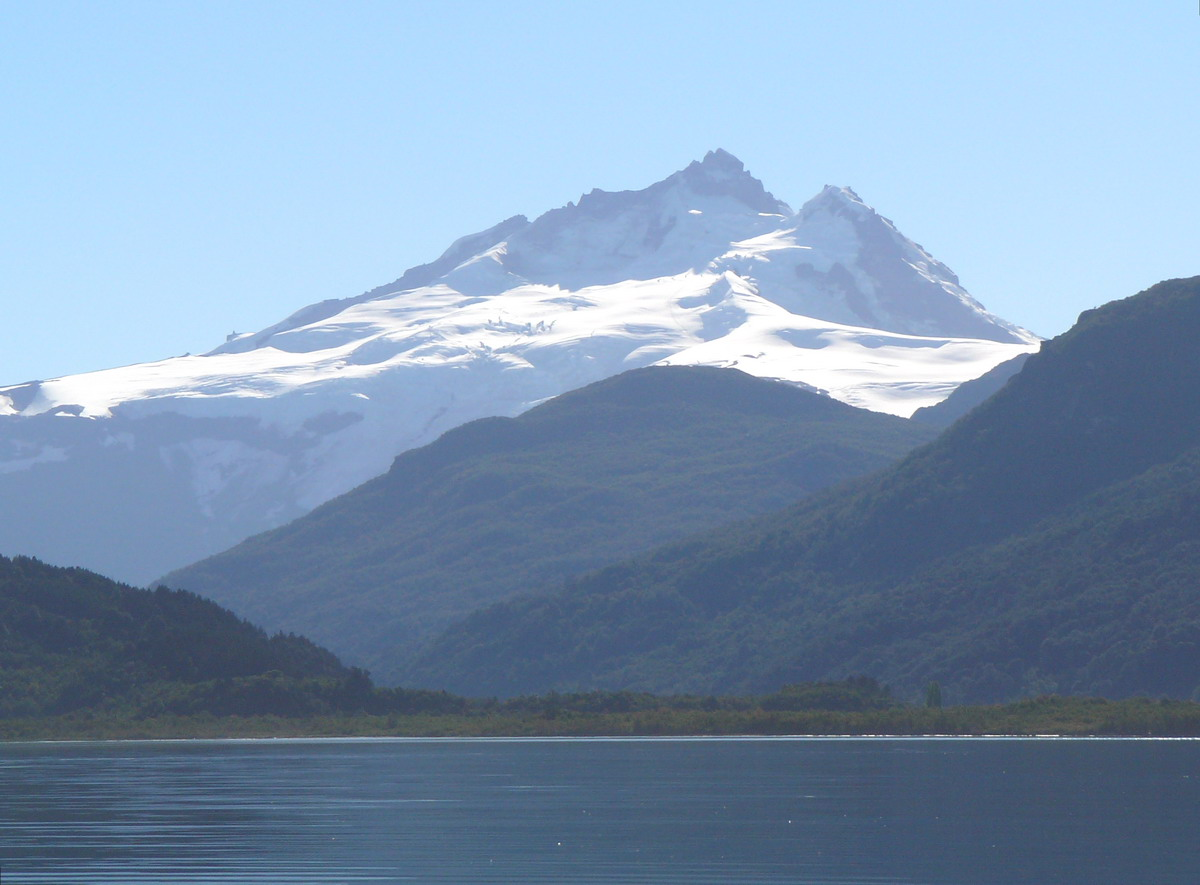
- View of Tronador mountain from Mascardi Lake, Argentina

Highest point
- Elevation: 3,491 m (11,453 ft)
- Prominence: 2,642 m (8,668 ft)
- Listing: Region high point Province high point Ultra
- Coordinates: 41°09′39″S 71°53′15″W

Naming
- English translation: thunderer

Geography
- Location within Argentina
- Location: Río Negro, Argentina; Los Lagos, Chile
- Parent range: Andes

Geology
- Mountain type: Stratovolcano
- Volcanic zone: South Volcanic Zone
- Last eruption: Unknown

Climbing
- First ascent: 1934 by Hermann Claussen

Tronador (Spanish: Cerro Tronador) is an extinct stratovolcano in the southern Andes, located along the border between Argentina and Chile, near the Argentine city of Bariloche. The mountain was named Tronador (Spanish for "Thunderer") by locals in reference to the sound of falling seracs. With an altitude of 3,470 metres (11,380 ft), Tronador stands more than 1,000 m above nearby mountains in the Andean massif, making it a popular mountaineering destination. Located inside two national parks, Nahuel Huapi in Argentina and Vicente Pérez Rosales in Chile, Tronador hosts a total of eight glaciers, which are currently retreating due to warming of the upper troposphere.

== Geography and geology ==
Cerro Tronador is in the Wet Andes, a zone of high precipitation of both snow and rain. The humid temperate climate of the southern Andes has allowed several glaciers to develop due to high accumulation rates. Most of the precipitation is produced by western frontal systems from the Pacific. Located in the middle of the Andean massif at a latitude of 41° S, Tronador is part of an alpine landscape of fjords, glacial lakes, and U-shaped valleys. The forming of the landscape took place during the Quaternary glaciations, periods during which the whole area was covered by the Patagonian Ice Sheet. The volcano grew during the glacials and interglacials of the Pleistocene but became practically extinct in the late Middle Pleistocene, approximately 300 ka ago, due to a shift in the active front of the Southern Volcanic Zone to which it belongs. Since then, glaciations and other erosive processes shaped the mountain freely without new output of lava or tephra. As in the case of nearby Lanín volcano, Tronador is composed mostly of basalts, and has seen a decline in activity as the Osorno and Calbuco volcanoes grow further west.

=== Glaciers ===
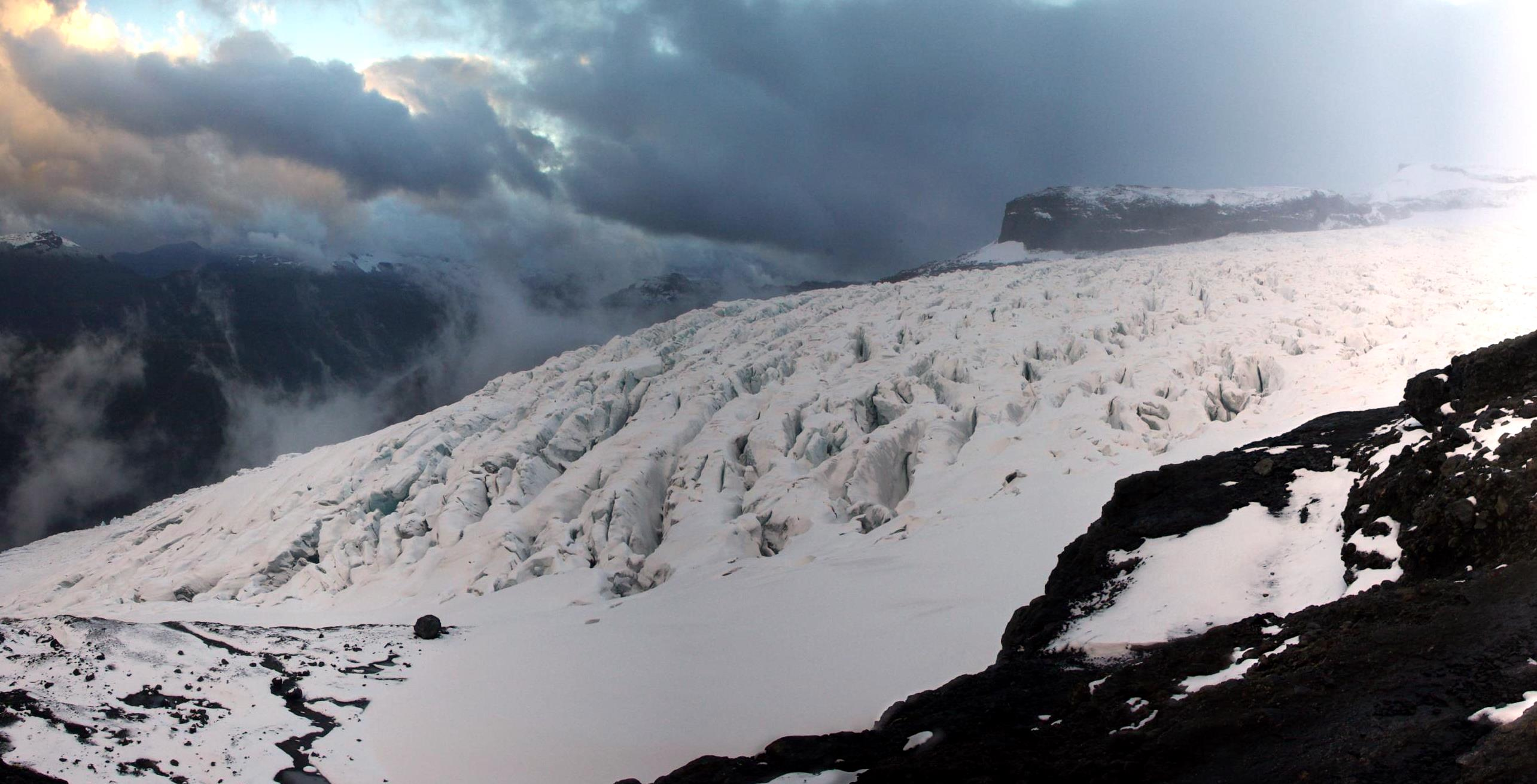
View of Castaño Overa Glacier

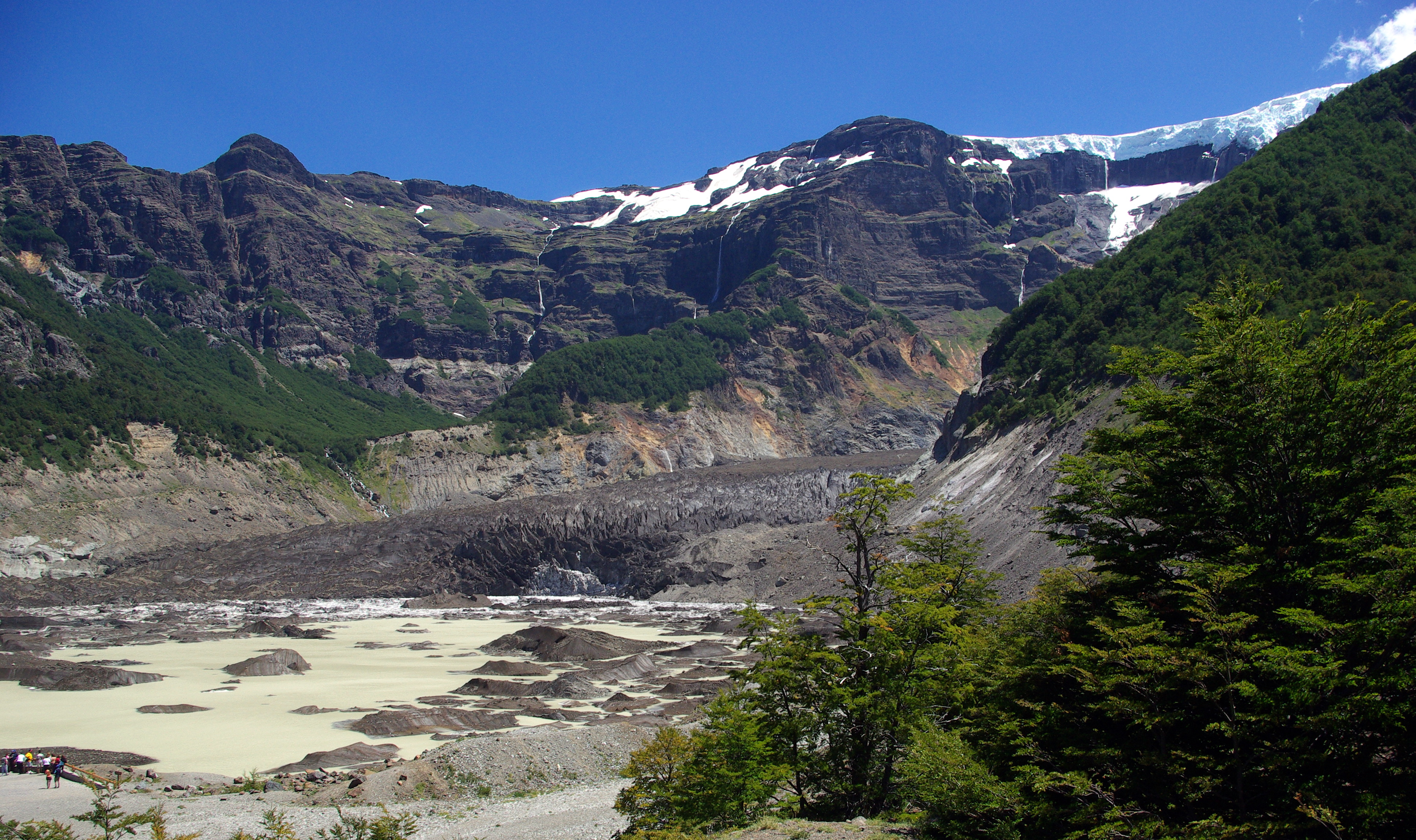
View of Ventisquero Negro

Tronador is notable for the many glaciers covering parts of its flanks. Up to eight glaciers have been inventoried: Alerce, Ventisquero Negro, Casa Pangue, Castaño Overa, Río Blanco, Frías, Peulla, and Manso. Over the last decades the glaciers on Tronador, like the majority of southern Andean glaciers, have been retreating. The Casa Pangue glacier on the northwestern side of Tronador experienced a thinning between 1961 and 1998, with an increased rate of retreat between 1981 and 1998 at 52 m a^{−1}. The retreat and thinning is attributed to a decrease in precipitation and a warming of the upper troposphere over the last several decades.

Alerce Glacier, on the Argentinian side, can be visited from Refugio Otto Meiling, a mountain hut that is sandwiched between it and Castaño Overa Glacier. Castaño Overa, also on the Argentinian side, is smaller and relatively accessible by hike from Pampa Linda. Guided trekking tours allow visitors to cross Castaño Overa or walk to Tronador's peak.

Ventisquero Negro ("black snowdrift" in Spanish) is a rather unusual glacier at the base of Tronador in Nahuel Huapi National Park. Its unusual dark brown colour comes from dirt and sediment picked up in the glacier's accumulation zone, which is fed by the Río Manso Glacier several hundred metres higher up the mountain. Brown icebergs calve from the glacier and then float in a small lake until eventually melting.

=== Peaks ===
According to the Aoneker map, these are the named peaks on Tronador: Anon or Internacional (3484m), Argentino (3187), Chileno (3262), and Torre Ilse (2585). Named ridges include Filo Sur (3054), Filo Blanco (3146), Filo La Vieja (2715), and Filo Lamotte (2340).

== Mountaineering and tourism ==
Tronador was first climbed by Hermann Claussen solo on 29 January 1934, after several attempts. A mountain hut, Refugio Otto Meiling, is the destination of popular day hikes on the mountain, and is named after a German mountaineer who made dozens of ascents and spent years guiding people around it. The hut is located about 1200m vertically above Pampa Linda, at the mountain's base.

Most summers the Internacional or Anon peaks (the highest of Tronador's three peaks) is climbable. However, an unusually hot summer increased rockfall to dangerous levels during January and February 2008. The Argentine side risks becoming no longer accessible due to increasingly warm weather in the region destabilising the glaciers.

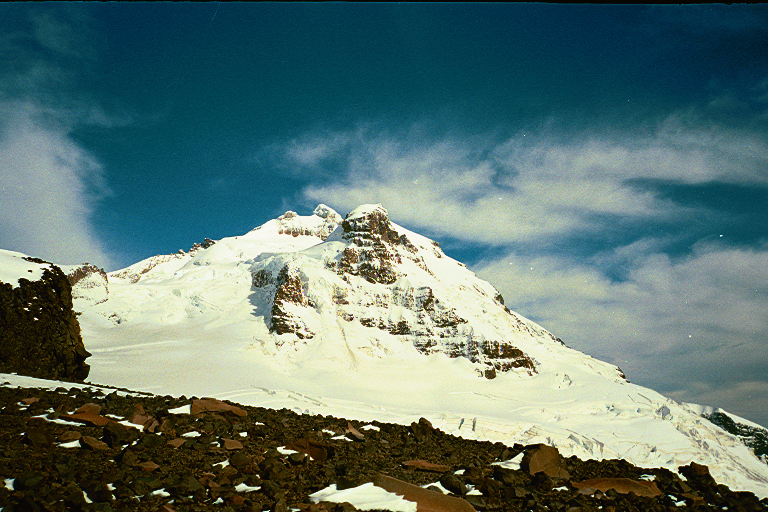
View of Tronador's main peak

== See also ==
- Cerro Volcánico
- Bariloche

== Gallery ==
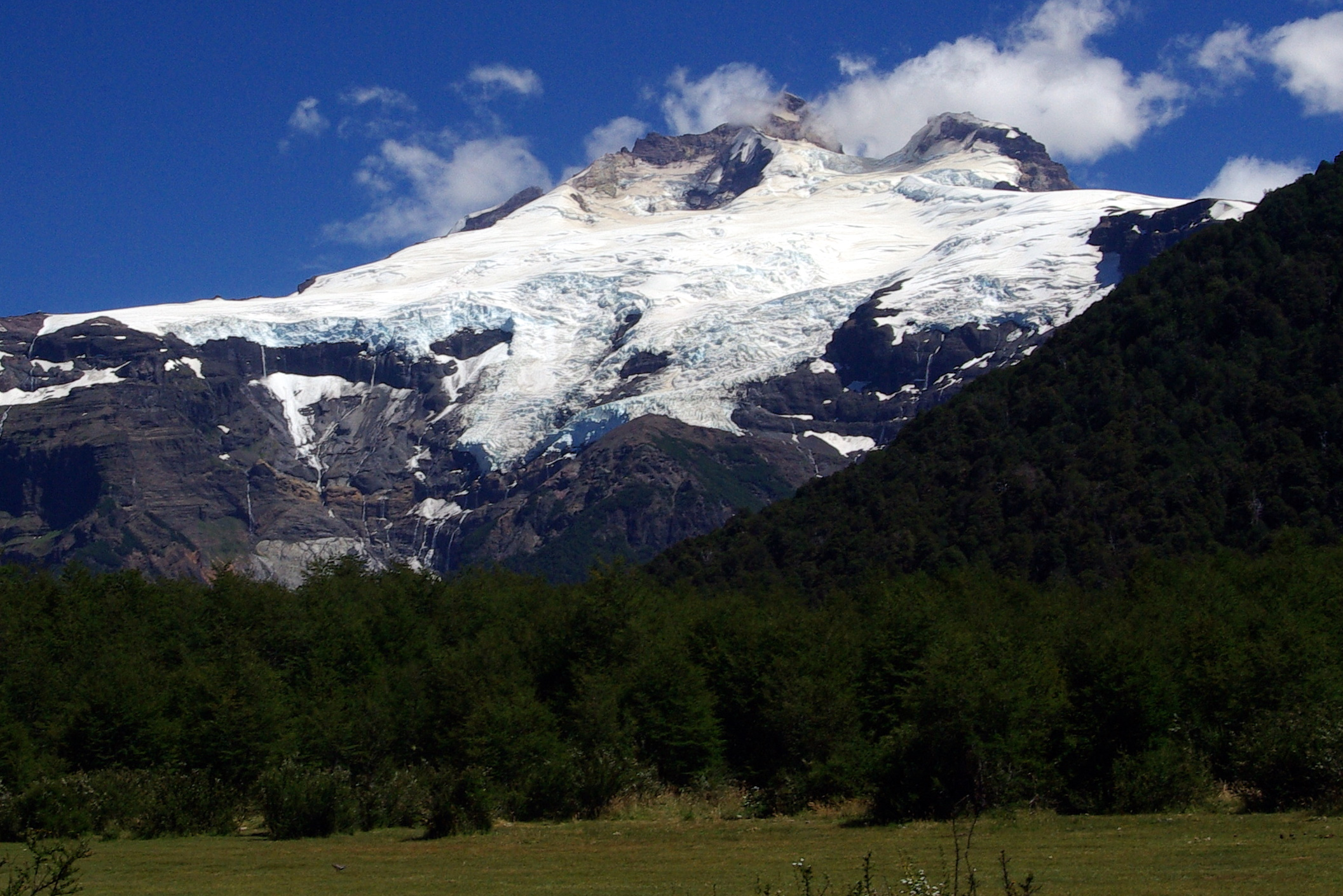
Seen from Pampa Linda.

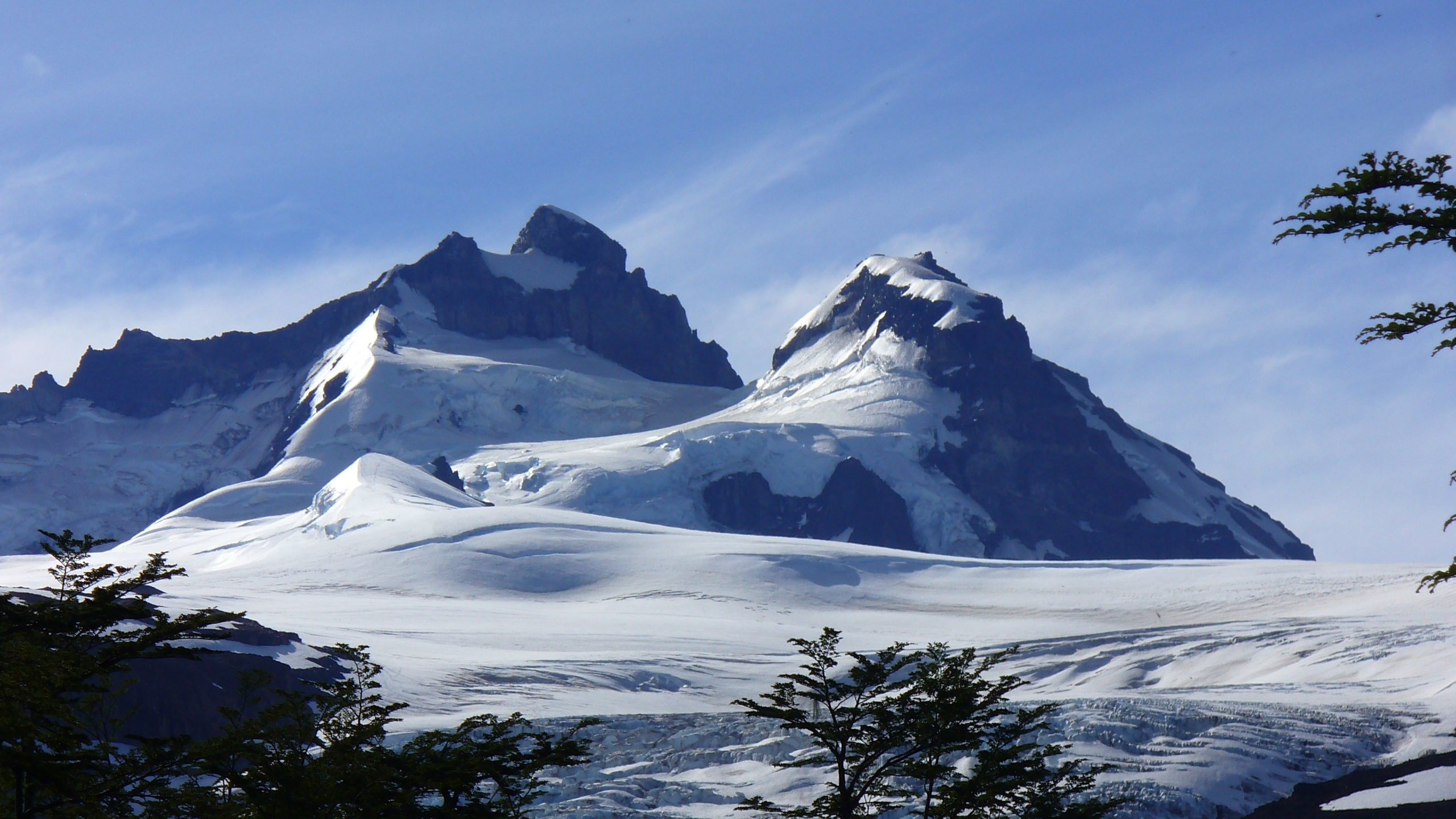

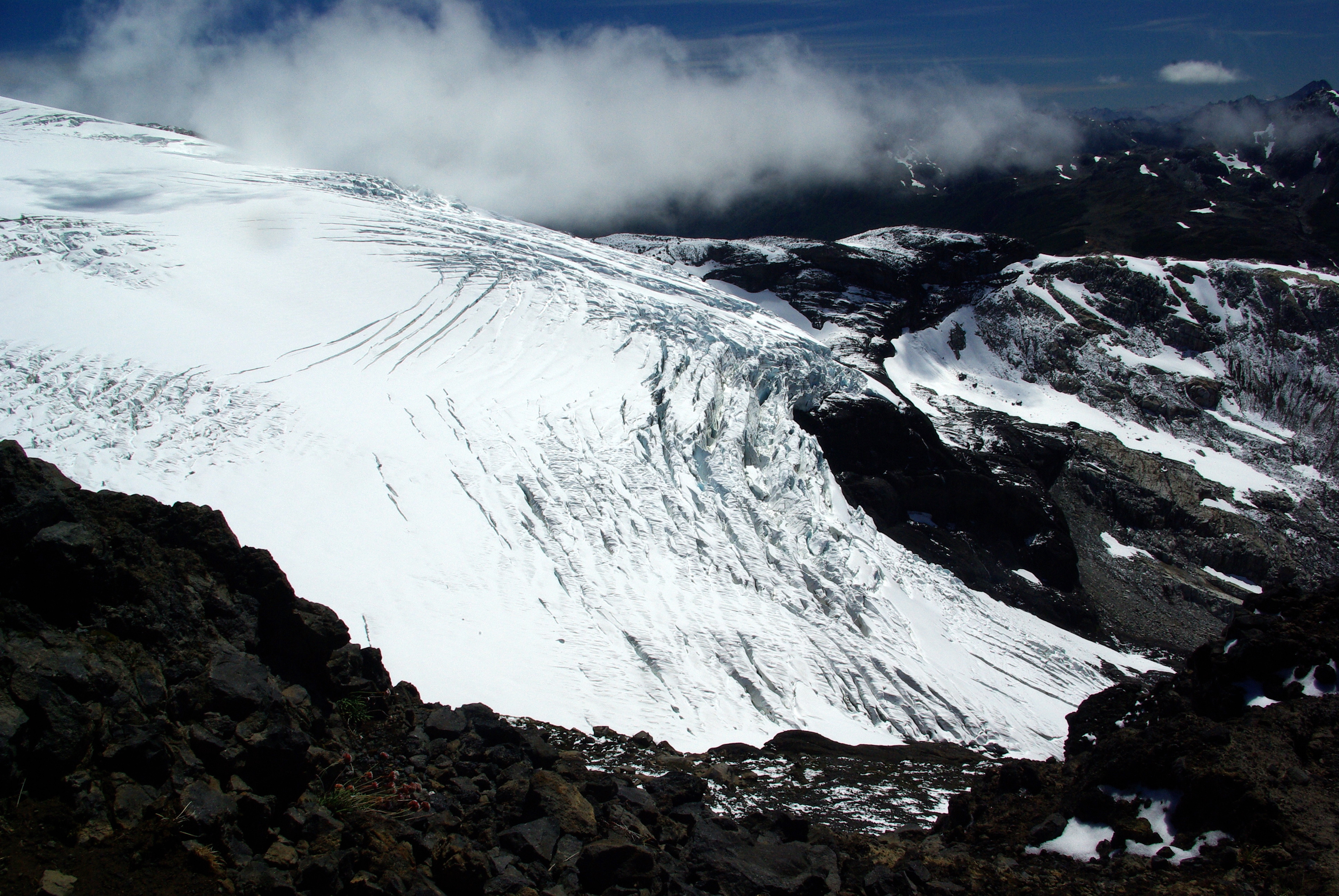
Alerce Glacier, one of Tronador's 7 glaciers.
