= El Bolsón, Río Negro =

El Bolsón
- Town
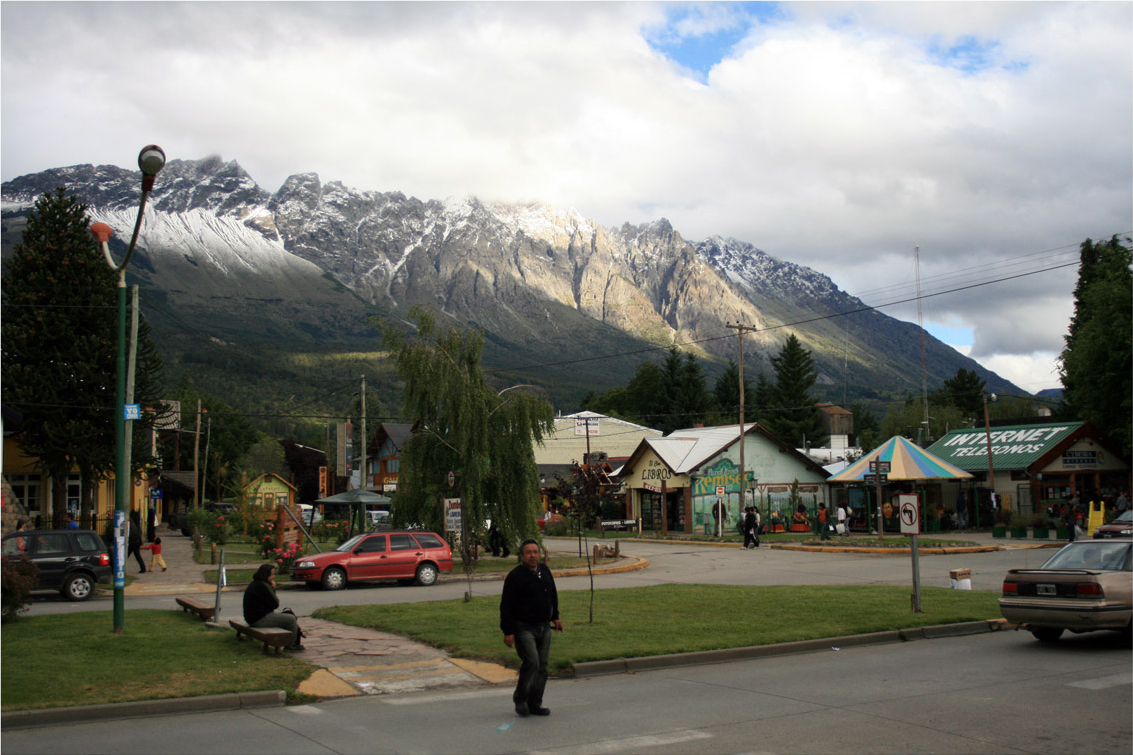

- Location of El Bolsón in Argentina
- Coordinates: 41°58′S 71°32′W
- Country: Argentina
- Province: Rio Negro
- Department: Bariloche

Government
  - Intendant: Bruno Pogliano (JSRN)
- Elevation: 422 m (1,385 ft)

Population
  - Total: 19,009
- Demonym: bolsonense
- Time zone: UTC−3 (ART)
- CPA base: U8430
- Dialing code: +54 2944
- Climate: Csb

Sculpture in a downtown El Bolsón park.

El Bolsón is a town in the southwest of Río Negro Province, Argentina, at the foot of the Piltriquitron Mountain. Due to a series of valleys through the mountains of the Andes to the Pacific Ocean, El Bolsón has an unusually mild climate for its southern location.

El Bolsón area's first non-indigenous inhabitants were Chilean farmers Lucas Cárdenas and Elcira Estrada, a couple who came in 1885 from San Pablo, near Osorno, and established themselves in the then known as "Valle Nuevo" (New Valley); in 2018, El Bolsón inaugurated the new Public Clock Square after the couple's names. In the 1970s, hippies from Buenos Aires migrated to El Bolsón; some of them practised horticulture and made handcrafts.

El Bolsón has a tourism economy based on an outdoor artisan market, fly fishing, trekking, rafting, climbing, and other outdoor activities in the surrounding lakes and mountains. The nature tourism offers are complemented with the production of cheeses, smoked trout, special brew beer, regional chocolates and ice cream, as well as organic and wild-crafted jams and preserves, particularly elderberries.

== Communication ==
El Bolsón is located approximately 120 km south of the major city of San Carlos de Bariloche and is served by El Bolsón Airport.

== Climate ==
El Bolsón has a cool Mediterranean climate (Köppen climate classification Csb) owing to its rain shadow location. Winters are the coldest time of year with a July mean of 3.5 °C (38.3 °F) with nighttime temperatures regularly falling below 0 °C (32.0 °F). During cold waves, temperatures can occasionally fall below −10 °C (14.0 °F). During the winter months, precipitation is abundant (mostly rainfall and occasionally snowfalls), resulting in most days being overcast, averaging 15–17 overcast days per month from May to August. Spring and fall are transition seasons featuring warmer temperatures than in winter. Summers are warmer and sunnier with temperatures during the day averaging 24.1 °C (75.4 °F) in January and comparatively high diurnal ranges, with lows averaging 7.4 °C (45.3 °F). Frosts can even occur during the summer months. Owing to its location in a valley, wind speeds are lower ranging from a low of 4 kilometres per hour (2.5 mph) in May and June to a high of 9 kilometres per hour (5.6 mph) in January.

Climate data for El Bolsón, Río Negro (1991–2020, extremes 1941–present)
Month	Jan	Feb	Mar	Apr	May	Jun	Jul	Aug	Sep	Oct	Nov	Dec	Year
Record high °C (°F)	38.4 (101.1)	38.2 (100.8)	34.6 (94.3)	27.5 (81.5)	24.2 (75.6)	20.8 (69.4)	19.5 (67.1)	20.5 (68.9)	24.2 (75.6)	32.1 (89.8)	34.2 (93.6)	37.3 (99.1)	38.4 (101.1)
Mean daily maximum °C (°F)	25.7 (78.3)	25.7 (78.3)	22.2 (72.0)	16.9 (62.4)	12.3 (54.1)	9.0 (48.2)	8.8 (47.8)	11.0 (51.8)	14.5 (58.1)	17.7 (63.9)	20.5 (68.9)	23.7 (74.7)	17.3 (63.1)
Daily mean °C (°F)	17.4 (63.3)	16.3 (61.3)	12.9 (55.2)	9.3 (48.7)	6.4 (43.5)	4.2 (39.6)	3.6 (38.5)	4.9 (40.8)	7.1 (44.8)	10.3 (50.5)	13.1 (55.6)	16.3 (61.3)	10.1 (50.2)
Mean daily minimum °C (°F)	7.9 (46.2)	7.7 (45.9)	5.8 (42.4)	3.5 (38.3)	1.8 (35.2)	0.3 (32.5)	−0.4 (31.3)	0.5 (32.9)	1.2 (34.2)	3.3 (37.9)	5.0 (41.0)	6.8 (44.2)	3.6 (38.5)
Record low °C (°F)	−1.8 (28.8)	−3.1 (26.4)	−4.3 (24.3)	−7.1 (19.2)	−10.5 (13.1)	−11.7 (10.9)	−11.5 (11.3)	−9.0 (15.8)	−8.3 (17.1)	−5.3 (22.5)	−3.5 (25.7)	−2.4 (27.7)	−11.7 (10.9)
Average precipitation mm (inches)	34.7 (1.37)	30.8 (1.21)	33.1 (1.30)	73.7 (2.90)	109.7 (4.32)	173.1 (6.81)	130.9 (5.15)	135.2 (5.32)	55.3 (2.18)	51.3 (2.02)	44.4 (1.75)	33.4 (1.31)	905.6 (35.65)
Average snowfall cm (inches)	0.0 (0.0)	0.0 (0.0)	1.1 (0.4)	0.0 (0.0)	1.6 (0.6)	7.7 (3.0)	10.2 (4.0)	2.8 (1.1)	0.7 (0.3)	0.2 (0.1)	0.0 (0.0)	0.0 (0.0)	24.3 (9.6)
Average precipitation days (≥ 0.1 mm)	4.3	4.5	5.9	8.3	12.0	14.6	13.7	13.8	8.1	8.2	6.4	4.7	104.6
Average snowy days	0.0	0.0	0.0	0.0	0.1	1.3	1.2	0.9	0.2	0.1	0.0	0.0	3.7
Average relative humidity (%)	59.3	65.1	71.4	78.3	82.3	83.3	83.8	79.8	72.8	67.6	62.8	59.2	72.1
Mean monthly sunshine hours	291.4	254.3	235.6	177.0	127.1	87.0	105.4	136.4	186.0	226.3	246.0	279.0	2,351.5
Mean daily sunshine hours	9.4	9.0	7.6	5.9	4.1	2.9	3.4	4.4	6.2	7.3	8.2	9.0	6.4
Source 1: Servicio Meteorológico Nacional
Source 2: Instituto Nacional de Tecnología Agropecuaria (snow and extremes 1941–1978), Secretaria de Mineria

== History ==
There have been many different inhabitants in the Bolsón region. However, the first settlers of the region were the Tsonek. By custom they were hunters/gatherers and seasonally nomadic. It was normal for them to stay in the more sheltered regions of the forests and lakes during the winter and to hunt Guanaco more intensely during the summer and warm autumns. Very little is known about them before the sixteenth century, but through the process of Araucanization they were strongly influenced by the Mapuches. They were the most solid and cohesive culture around and were gaining ground toward eastern Patagonia, through both peaceful means and expansionist wars.

This town was not founded by any conqueror, Adelantado, explorer, or discoverer. This region simply served as a place of passage for the migrations of Tsonek communities, humans looking for game, and gatherers for a long time. Afterwards, it was purely Mapuche territory. Later, with the first inroads of the Europeans in the region, it also provided temporary shelter to those who were carrying cattle and herdsmen crossing the cordillera in an east-west direction, and vice versa, from one sea coast to another. This, as well as Argentina's expansion into the region, resulted in frequent conflicts and disagreements with the Mapuche people.

The founding date of El Bolsón is considered to be 28 January 1926. On that day, local residents gathered at the home of Candido Azcona to establish the region's first administrative organization, signing the charter for the "Commission for the Promotion of El Bolsón". The newly elected leadership consisted of President Pedro Pascual Ponce, an Argentine native from the Province of San Luis who worked as a teacher, an ad honorem informant for the Ministry of Agriculture, a cattle raiser, and a contributor to the national census. He served alongside Vice President Candido Azcona, a Basque farmer and merchant from Basque Country. Rounding out the committee were Secretary Antonio Merino Rubio, a Spanish merchant and farmer from Málaga, Treasurer José Ulieldin, a Lebanese merchant, and Pro-Treasurer Miguel Anden, who was also a Lebanese merchant.

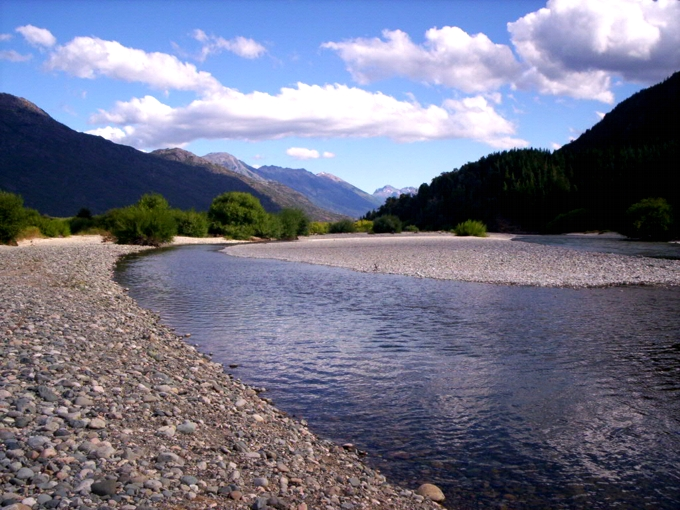
Río Azul, near El Bolsón.

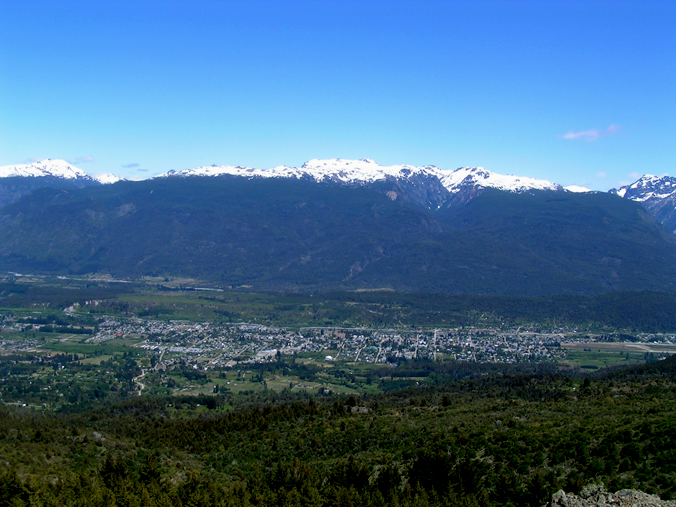
View of El Bolsón from the Piltriquitron mountain.
