= Bondiola sandwich =

Argentinian sandwich with pork shoulder

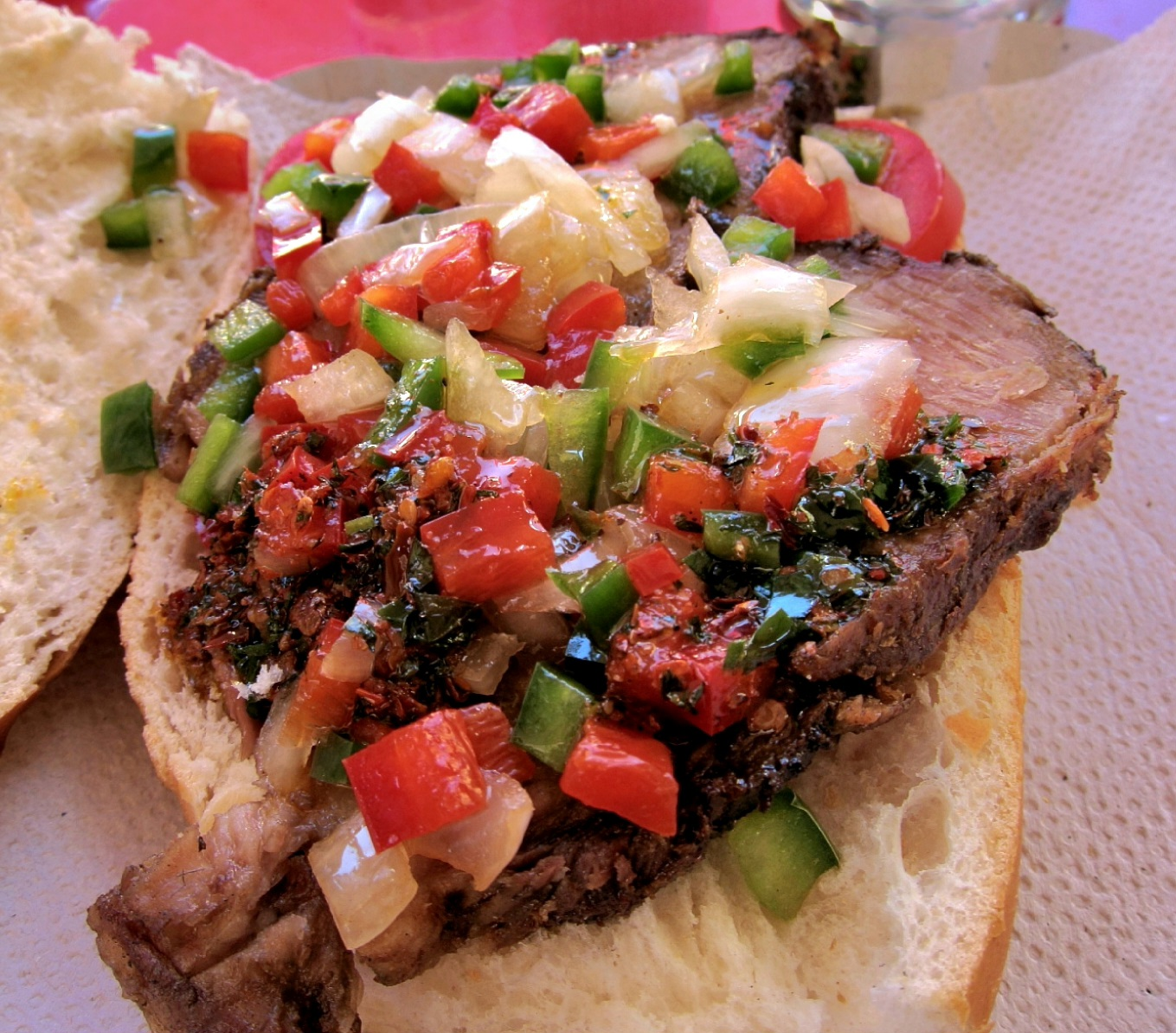
- Bondiola sandwich with toppings
- Alternative names: Spanish: Sándwich de bondiola
- Type: Sandwich
- Course: Street food
- Place of origin: Argentina
- Region or state: South America
- Associated cuisine: Roasted pork shoulder
- Main ingredients: Pork; Brioche
- Ingredients generally used: Lemon juice
- Variations: Bacon and onions

Bondiola sandwich (Spanish: Sándwich de bondiola) or bondipan is a sandwich made with thick slices of pork shoulder. They are commonly sold by street food vendors and restaurants in Argentina. The meat consists of slices of roasted or cured pork shoulder and it is usually served on crispy brioche bread. It can be topped with a variety of condiments and vegetables.

== History ==
The sandwich is common in many restaurants in Buenos Aires. By 2013 it rivaled the choripán (sausage) and the parrilla (grilled fresh meat) in popularity. The sandwich is also commonly referred to as a "bondipan". The pork is typically grilled and the sandwich is considered street food. It is considered to be a traditional food item: thick slices of pork are served on a crisp bun served with lemon and garlic dressing.

In Argentina the sandwich is also offered at all Burger King fast food restaurants: they call it the "Bondiolita King". The sandwich is offered with a choice of traditional toppings on a bread that is topped with wheat germ. The sandwich is also offered at Burger King restaurants in Paraguay.

== Description ==
The meat consists of slices of roasted cured pork shoulder which is served on bread. The sandwich is usually served with lemon juice. There are variations of the bondiola sandwich. Occasionally the bondiola meat is braised in beer, and served with cheddar cheese and caramelized onions, and served on brioche bread. It can be accompanied by coleslaw, cabbage and a mayonnaise salad. Occasionally the bondiola meat is stuffed with other ingredients such as bacon and onions and served on a bun. The sandwich is often served in a portion large enough for more than one person.

=== Bondiola meat ===
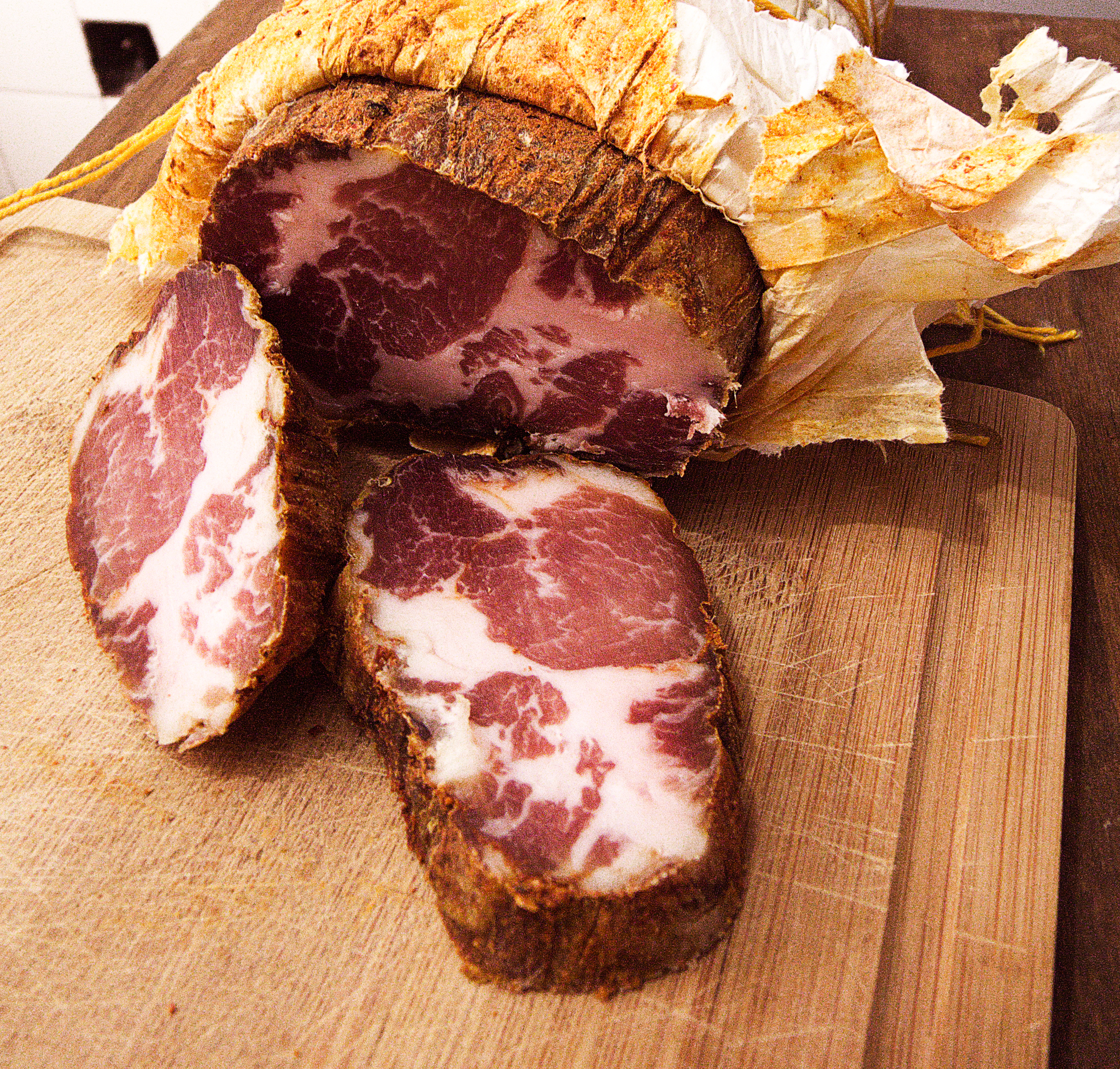
Cured bondiola meat

The fatty pork shoulder meat is prepared with seasoning which includes nutmeg, salt, paprika, and pepper. The meat is then wrapped and tied for 30 to 60 days. During the process water evaporates from the meat, and fermentation of lactic acid occurs. The enzymes which are released give it flavor. Bondiola can also be made using pork rear legs and meat taken from the neck muscles.

The process of curing the bondiola often includes curing the meat in a pig's bladder and some forms involve adding veal (bondiola di Adria) or smoking the meat (bondiola affumicata). When bacon is included in the curing process it is called Bondiola di Treviso. An American equivalent of a similar cut of meat would be Boston butt.

== See also ==
- List of sandwiches
- List of sausages
- List of sausage dishes
- List of pork dishes
