= Boston butt =

Pork shoulder cut

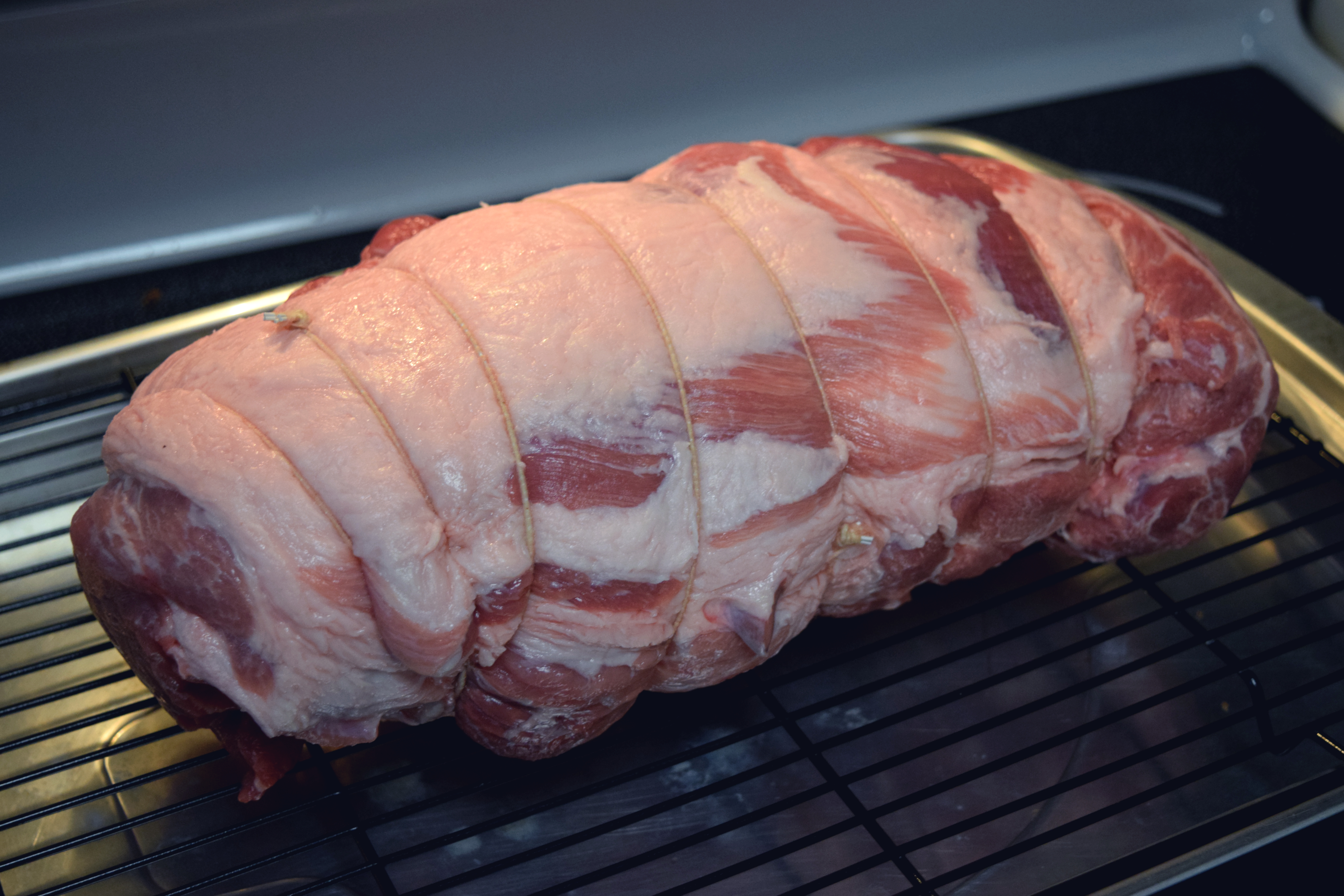
A boneless Boston butt: rolled, trussed, and ready for roasting

A Boston butt is a slightly wedge-shaped portion cut of the pork shoulder located above the standard picnic cut. It includes the blade bone or may be sold as a boneless “lean butt,” and it can be used as a substitutes for tenderloin in certain preparations. The pork shoulder is generally classified as a primal cut, with the picnic and butt portions considered sub-primal cuts. Some sources, however, refer to the butt itself as a primary cut.

== Etymology and origins of the cut ==
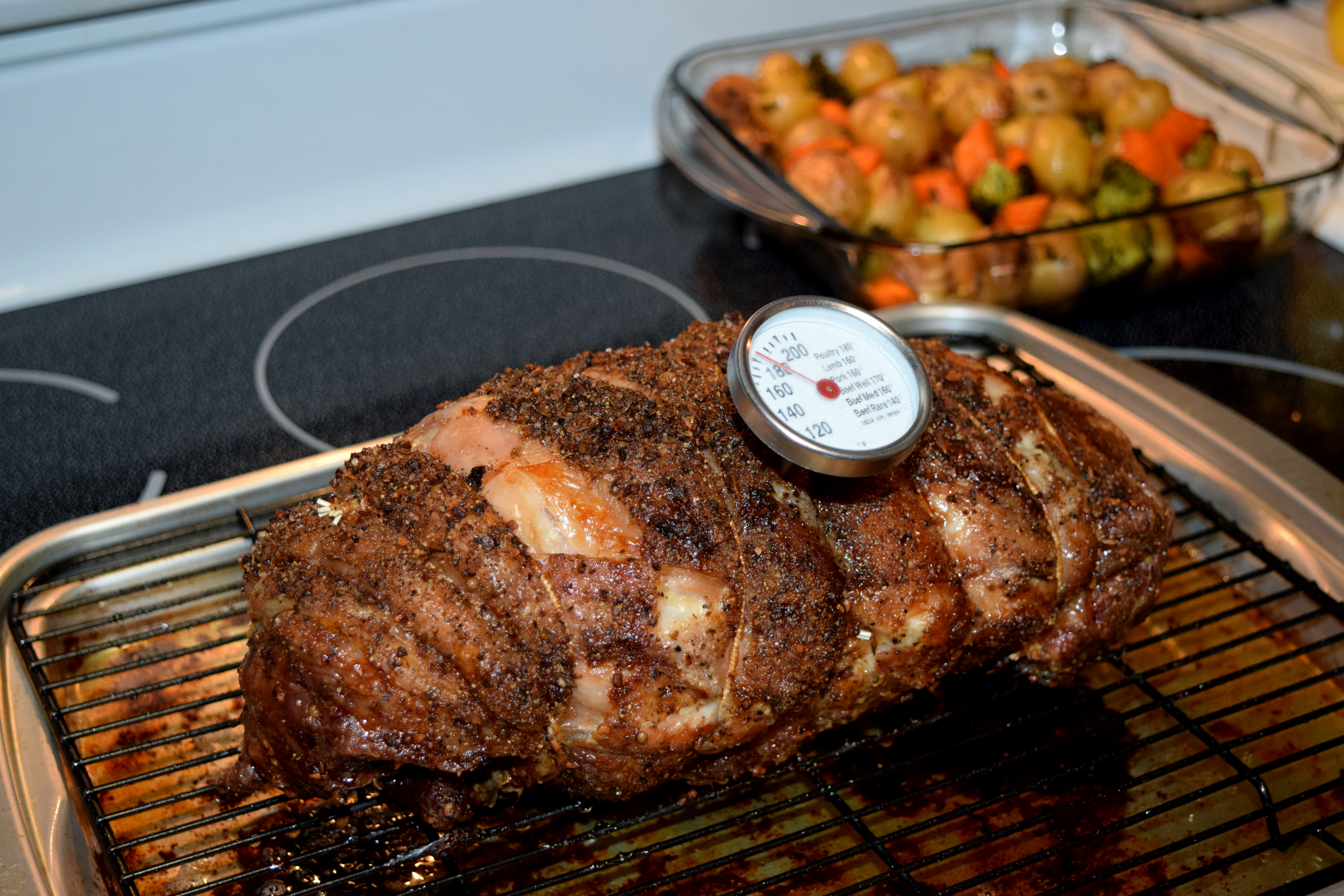
Boneless Boston butt roast, fully cooked to 180 degrees

In Colonial and Revolutionary-era New England, butchers used specialized barrels known as butts to store and transport particular cuts of pork. The butchering method associated with this cut appears to have originated in New England, and particularly in the Boston area, which gave rise to the name "Boston butt". According to a 1912 bulletin published by the Agricultural Experiment Station of the University of Illinois, these barrels were still in use at that time for exports to Germany, Denmark and other European countries, as well as for domestic distribution within the United States. Despite this, the earliest known printed reference to the term “Boston butt” does not appear until 1915, in the publication Hotel Monthly.

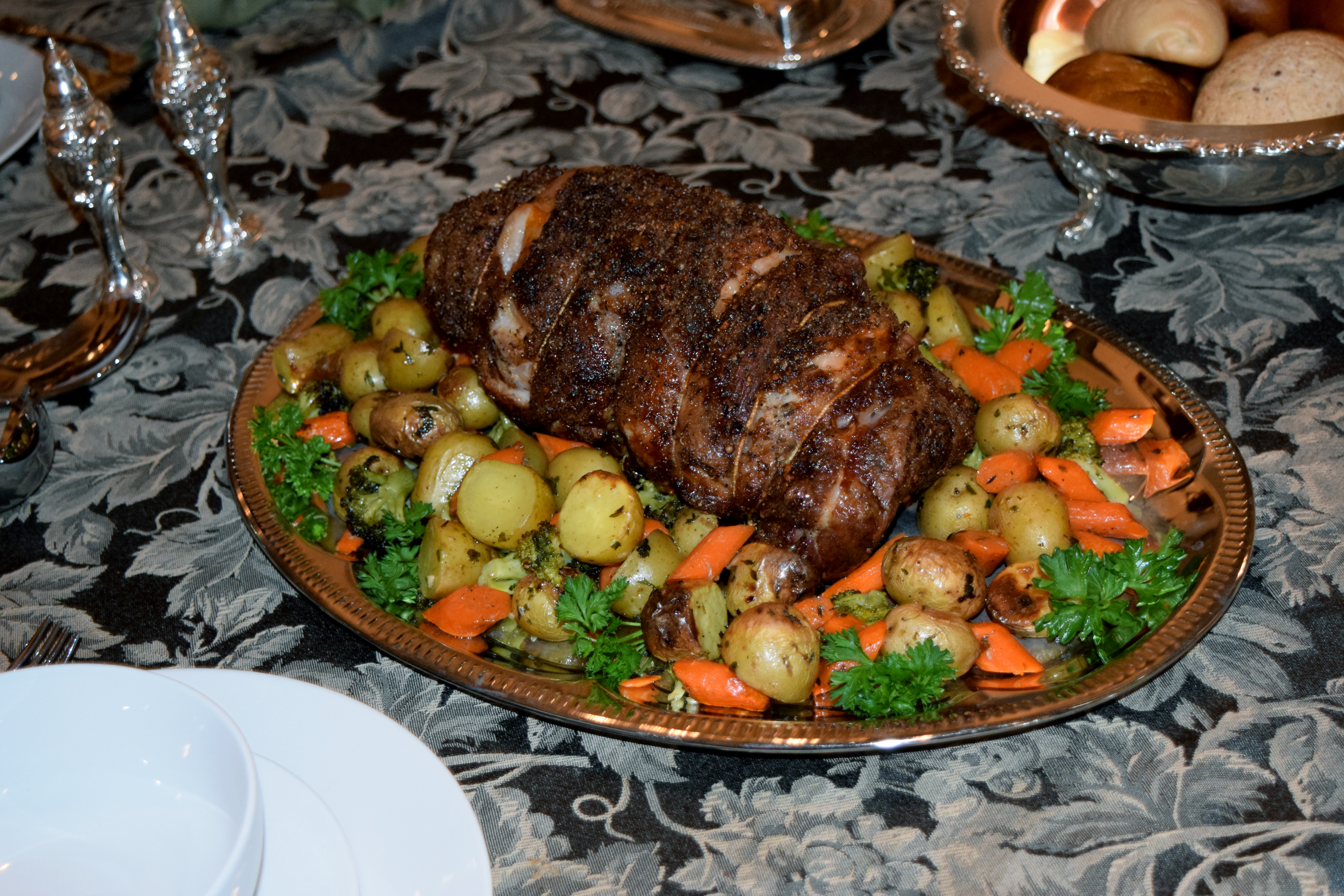
Boston butt roast served on a platter with roasted potatoes and carrots

== See also ==
- Bondiola
- Capocollo
- Cut of pork
