= Equal housing lender =

United States legal term

Equal Housing Lender is a term used by United States financial institutions to indicate that they comply with the Federal Fair Lending Laws under the Federal Fair Housing Act and the Equal Credit Opportunity Act. These laws and regulations pertain to all federally supervised institutions, including those insured by the Federal Deposit Insurance Corporation (FDIC) and the National Credit Union Administration (NCUA).

Under the Equal Credit Opportunity Act (ECOA), creditors are prohibited from discriminating on the basis of race, color, religion, national origin, sex, disability, or familial status. They are also prohibited from discriminating because an applicant receives income from a public assistance program or because they have in good faith exercised any right under the Consumer Credit Protection Act of 1968.

Federally insured financial institutions engaging in real-estate-related lending are required to explicitly display a notice of nondiscrimination using the prescribed Equal Housing Lender logo and language in the public lobby as well as in any office where such loans are made. This requirement also extends to advertisements.

This rule was introduced in the Fair Housing Amendments Act of 1988, which amended the Fair Housing Act of 1968.
