= El Bolsón Airport =

Airport in Argentina

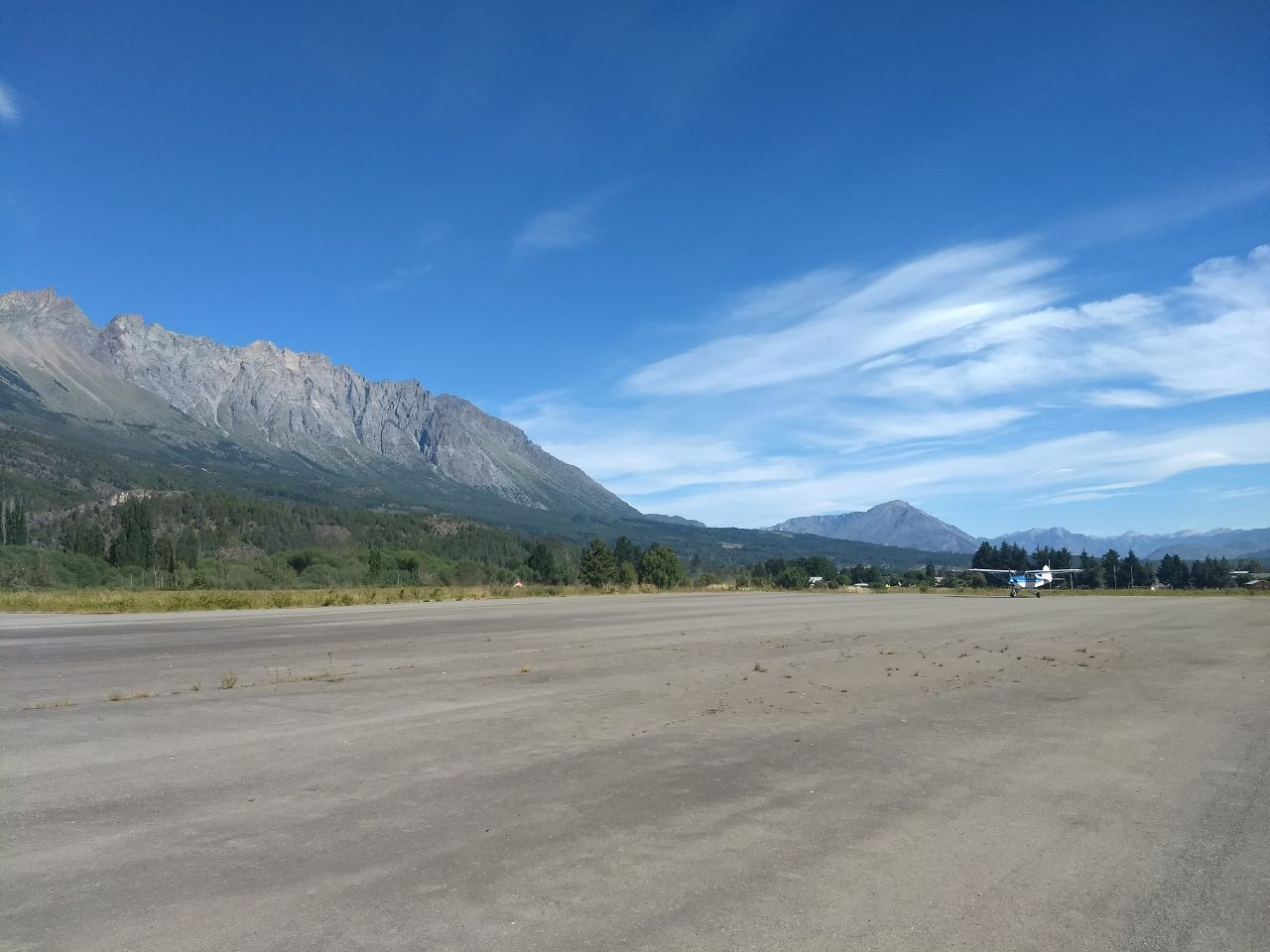
- IATA: EHL; ICAO: SAVB

Summary
- Serves: El Bolsón
- Elevation AMSL: 1,131 ft (345 m)
- Coordinates: 41°56′36″S 71°31′56″W

Map
- Location of the airport in Argentina

Runways
Direction	Length		Surface
Direction	ft	m	Surface
18/36	4,265	1,300	Asphalt
- Sources: World Aero Data

El Bolsón Airport (IATA: EHL, ICAO: SAVB) is an airport serving El Bolsón, Río Negro, Argentina.

== Airlines and destinations ==
Airlines	Destinations
LADE	San Carlos de Bariloche

== Accidents and incidents ==
- 7 August 1977: A LADE Twin Otter 300, tail number T-87, crashed into Cerro Bayo shortly after takeoff from the airport, bound for Comodoro Rivadavia, killing all six aboard.

== See also ==
- List of airports in Argentina
