= 2025 Dutch Masters of Motocross =

Dutch Motocross Competition in 2025

The 2025 Dutch Masters of Motocross season was the 8th Dutch Masters of Motocross season.

The series consisted of three rounds across the eastern part of The Netherlands, running from late March to the middle of May. Jeffrey Herlings was the reigning champion in the 500cc class, after he won his sixth overall series title in the 2024 season. With Herlings missing the first round due to recovering from an injury, Frenchman Romain Febvre won his first title in the championship.

Rick Elzinga went into the season as the defending champion in the 250cc class, after picking up his second title in the previous season. Cas Valk was able to win every race in the series to take his first 250cc class crown.

== Race calendar and results ==
=== 500cc ===
Round	Date	Location	Race 1 Winner	Race 2 Winner	Round Winner
1	30 March	(Gelderland) Harfsen	(France) Romain Febvre	(France) Romain Febvre	(France) Romain Febvre
2	26 April	(Gelderland) Oldebroek	(France) Romain Febvre	(France) Romain Febvre	(France) Romain Febvre
3	18 May	(Overijssel) Markelo	(Netherlands) Jeffrey Herlings	(Netherlands) Jeffrey Herlings	(Netherlands) Jeffrey Herlings

=== 250cc ===
Round	Date	Location	Race 1 Winner	Race 2 Winner	Round Winner
1	30 March	(Gelderland) Harfsen	(Netherlands) Cas Valk	(Netherlands) Cas Valk	(Netherlands) Cas Valk
2	26 April	(Gelderland) Oldebroek	(Netherlands) Cas Valk	(Netherlands) Cas Valk	(Netherlands) Cas Valk
3	18 May	(Overijssel) Markelo	(Netherlands) Cas Valk	(Netherlands) Cas Valk	(Netherlands) Cas Valk

=== Circuit locations ===
2025 Dutch Masters of Motocross locations

== 500cc ==
=== Participants ===
Team	Constructor	No	Rider	Rounds
Kawasaki Racing Team MXGP	Kawasaki	3	(France) Romain Febvre	All
	Yamaha	7	(Netherlands) Kevin van Dam	All
Monster Energy Yamaha Factory MXGP Team	Yamaha	10	(Netherlands) Calvin Vlaanderen	1
Monster Energy Yamaha Factory MXGP Team	Yamaha	93	(Belgium) Jago Geerts	All
Laurense Motors/WLM Design	Kawasaki	15	(Netherlands) Erik de Bruyn	All
JM Honda Racing	Honda	32	(Belgium) Brent Van Doninck	2
JHMX Racing	Gas Gas	33	(Netherlands) Stan van Zoggel	1, 3
JHMX Racing	Gas Gas	34	(Netherlands) Micha-Boy de Waal	All
JHMX Racing	KTM	136	(Netherlands) Loeka Thonies	All
Duntep	Husqvarna	35	(Netherlands) Sander Hofstede	1–2
Camping Cupido	Yamaha	38	(Netherlands) Marcel Conijn	All
Bruggen Tweewielers	Yamaha	42	(Netherlands) Ward Monkel	All
KTM Silve Racing	KTM	43	(Finland) Matias Vesterinen	1
KTM Silve Racing	KTM	142	(Finland) Jere Haavisto	1
Van Dijck MX Products	Kawasaki	47	(Netherlands) Bram van den Hoek	1
Team Husqvarna Motorcycles Scandinavia	Husqvarna	52	(Sweden) Albin Gerhardsson	1
VisuAlz Production	Husqvarna	66	(Germany) Tim Koch	1
Buitenhuis Racing	Yamaha	77	(Netherlands) Kevin Buitenhuis	All
Red Bull KTM Factory Racing	KTM	84	(Netherlands) Jeffrey Herlings	2–3
	KTM	87	(Netherlands) Nick Spannenburg	2
Kehrli Motos	Yamaha	92	(Switzerland) Valentin Guillod	1
Laurense Motors Kawasaki Racing Team	Kawasaki	94	(Netherlands) Sven van der Mierden	All
Laurense Motors Kawasaki Racing Team	Kawasaki	841	(Netherlands) Robert Fobbe	All
	Yamaha	101	(Netherlands) Jelke Baarda	1, 3
JS Racing	Yamaha	104	(Germany) Dominik Grau	1
Team MC de Willemsvrienden	Gas Gas	113	(Belgium) Jammy Cornil	1
Van der Velden Motoren	KTM	118	(Netherlands) Joël van Mechelen	All
Bruggen Motors Yamaha	Yamaha	121	(Netherlands) Mitchel van den Essenburg	1–2
Fantic Factory Racing MXGP	Fantic	132	(Italy) Andrea Bonacorsi	1–2
Fantic Factory Racing MXGP	Fantic	189	(Netherlands) Brian Bogers	All
BvZ Motorrad	KTM	134	(Germany) Toni Hoffmann	1
Luke's Racing Team - Hertrampf Gruppe	Honda	143	(Australia) Mitchell Evans	1
AIT Racing Team	Fantic	152	(Bulgaria) Petar Petrov	2
	KTM	182	(Republic of Ireland) Jake Sheridan	All
	Kawasaki	191	(Lithuania) Erlandas Mackonis	1
	KTM	198	(Sweden) Jesper Hansson	1–2
	KTM	201	(Netherlands) Robin van Oldeniel	All
Sigmans Yamaha	Yamaha	217	(Netherlands) Teun Cooijmans	All
Brouwer Motors KTM	KTM	241	(Netherlands) Michel Hoenson	All
Motostar Yamaha	Yamaha	297	(Sweden) Anton Gole	1
Hannamax Motorsport	KTM	422	(Netherlands) Tyler Eltink	1, 3
Schepers Racing	Honda	424	(Netherlands) Wesley Schepers	All
YRC High Performance	Yamaha	427	(Norway) Håkon Fredriksen	1
Twenty Racing Suspension Gas Gas	Gas Gas	444	(Netherlands) Jeremy Knuiman	All
WPM Motors	KTM	484	(Netherlands) Dave Kooiker	All
	KTM	521	(Netherlands) Boris Blanken	All
	KTM	601	(United Kingdom) Kelton Gwyther	2
DK Off-road powered by Bikesport Newcastle	Honda	714	(United Kingdom) Brad Todd	2
	Yamaha	822	(Netherlands) Mike Bolink	All
Andre Motors KTM	KTM	826	(Netherlands) Nick Leerkes	All
VisuAlz Production by SAS Kawasaki	Kawasaki	891	(Germany) Paul Ullrich	All

=== Riders Championship ===
Points are awarded to finishers of the main races, in the following format:

Position	1st	2nd	3rd	4th	5th	6th	7th	8th	9th	10th	11th	12th	13th	14th	15th	16th	17th	18th	19th	20th+
Points	25	22	20	18	16	15	14	13	12	11	10	9	8	7	6	5	4	3	2	1

Pos	Rider	Bike	HAR (Gelderland)		OLD (Gelderland)		MAR (Overijssel)		Points
1	(France) Romain Febvre	Kawasaki	1	1	1	1	2	2	144
2	(Belgium) Jago Geerts	Yamaha	4	4	5	2	3	3	114
3	(Netherlands) Brian Bogers	Fantic	5	6	3	5	4	4	103
4	(Netherlands) Jeffrey Herlings	KTM			2	3	1	1	92
5	(Netherlands) Sven van der Mierden	Kawasaki	10	10	8	8	5	7	78
6	(Italy) Andrea Bonacorsi	Fantic	9	3	4	4			68
7	(Netherlands) Micha-Boy de Waal	Gas Gas	38	40	7	7	7	5	60
8	(Netherlands) Nick Leerkes	KTM	17	13	12	12	12	9	51
9	(Netherlands) Jeremy Knuiman	Gas Gas	8	12	Ret	DNS	6	8	50
10	(Netherlands) Marcel Conijn	Yamaha	16	15	15	11	10	10	49
11	(Netherlands) Mike Bolink	Yamaha	20	20	13	13	9	6	45
12	(Netherlands) Calvin Vlaanderen	Yamaha	2	2					44
13	(Netherlands) Joël van Mechelen	KTM	18	14	14	17	13	12	38
14	(Netherlands) Dave Kooiker	KTM	15	19	16	14	11	13	38
15	(Switzerland) Valentin Guillod	Yamaha	3	5					36
16	(Netherlands) Robert Fobbe	Kawasaki	19	27	17	10	8	Ret	31
17	(Belgium) Brent Van Doninck	Honda			6	6			30
18	(Norway) Håkon Fredriksen	Yamaha	6	7					29
19	(Finland) Jere Haavisto	KTM	7	8					27
20	(United Kingdom) Brad Todd	Honda			9	9			24
21	(Netherlands) Loeka Thonies	KTM	24	33	19	16	14	14	23
22	(Netherlands) Mitchel van den Essenburg	Yamaha	36	16	10	15			23
23	(Sweden) Anton Gole	Yamaha	11	9					22
24	(Netherlands) Boris Blanken	KTM	13	18	Ret	Ret	Ret	11	21
25	(Sweden) Albin Gerhardsson	Husqvarna	12	11					19
26	(Netherlands) Robin van Oldeniel	KTM	25	25	24	19	16	15	16
27	(Bulgaria) Petar Petrov	Fantic			11	29			11
28	(Netherlands) Michel Hoenson	KTM	27	32	26	24	19	17	10
29	(Netherlands) Teun Cooijmans	Yamaha	29	35	23	18	21	19	9
30	(Netherlands) Wesley Schepers	Honda	28	30	DNS	DNS	15	22	9
31	(Netherlands) Tyler Eltink	KTM	22	23			22	16	8
32	(Netherlands) Stan van Zoggel	Gas Gas	39	36			18	18	8
33	(Netherlands) Kevin van Dam	Yamaha	37	26	Ret	30	17	20	8
34	(Netherlands) Erik de Bruyn	Kawasaki	32	37	18	22	20	24	8
35	(Australia) Mitchell Evans	Honda	14	39					8
36	(Netherlands) Kevin Buitenhuis	Yamaha	31	31	20	21	23	23	6
37	(Germany) Tim Koch	Husqvarna	21	17					5
38	(Germany) Paul Ullrich	Kawasaki	DNQ	29	21	20	Ret	21	4
39	(Republic of Ireland) Jake Sheridan	KTM	DNQ	DNQ	27	25	25	25	4
40	(Sweden) Jesper Hansson	KTM	26	28	22	28			4
41	(Netherlands) Bram van den Hoek	Kawasaki	23	21					2
42	(Germany) Toni Hoffmann	KTM	34	22					2
43	(Finland) Matias Vesterinen	KTM	30	24					2
44	(Netherlands) Nick Spannenburg	KTM			28	26			2
45	(Netherlands) Ward Monkel	Yamaha			25	23	Ret	Ret	2
46	(United Kingdom) Kelton Gwyther	KTM			29	27			2
47	(Netherlands) Sander Hofstede	Husqvarna	35	34	Ret	DNS			2
48	(Germany) Dominik Grau	Yamaha	40	38					2
49	(Netherlands) Jelke Baarda	Yamaha	DNQ	DNQ			24	Ret	1
50	(Lithuania) Erlandas Mackonis	Kawasaki	33	DNS					1
Pos	Rider	Bike	HAR (Gelderland)		OLD (Gelderland)		MAR (Overijssel)		Points

== 250cc ==
=== Participants ===
Team	Constructor	No	Rider	Rounds
Monster Energy Yamaha Factory	Yamaha	4	(Netherlands) Rick Elzinga	1
Monster Energy Yamaha Factory	Yamaha	47	(Latvia) Kārlis Reišulis	2
AIT Racing Team	Fantic	12	(Norway) Håkon Østerhagen	1–2
AIT Racing Team	Fantic	407	(United Kingdom) Jake Davies	All
BRS Racing Team	Fantic	13	(Sweden) Adam Fridlund	1
Bergevoet Doetinchem	KTM	14	(Netherlands) Damian Bergevoet	2–3
Gebben Racing	Yamaha	15	(Netherlands) Svenn Borger	2–3
	KTM	16	(Netherlands) Roan Bekkers	3
Motor Centrum Eibergen	Triumph	21	(Netherlands) Greg van der Weide	All
JM Honda Racing	Honda	22	(Spain) David Braceras	1–2
JM Honda Racing	Honda	716	(Hungary) Noel Zanócz	1–2
Van de Laar Racing	KTM	24	(Netherlands) Jordy van Orsouw	All
Pol Transport B.V.	Yamaha	28	(Netherlands) Ivo Pol	2–3
JP Xtreme Xperience	KTM	29	(Norway) Sander Agard-Michelsen	All
JP Xtreme Xperience	KTM	644	(Netherlands) Thijs Schroder	All
	Husqvarna	30	(Netherlands) Mats Leeuwesteijn	1, 3
Sigmans Motoren	Yamaha	32	(United Kingdom) Marcus-Lee Soper	All
	Kawasaki	33	(Netherlands) Kay Karssemakers	3
	KTM	36	(Netherlands) Joep Poland	3
	KTM	42	(Netherlands) Twan de Weerd	2–3
Brouwer Motors	KTM	49	(Netherlands) Wessel van Wijk	1–2
Outlawracing.nl	Suzuki	51	(Netherlands) Jarno Duineveld	2–3
Nilssons Motor	Kawasaki	63	(Sweden) Axel Lars Isgren	1
KTM Kosak Team	KTM	75	(Netherlands) Bradley Mesters	1
WZ Racing Team	KTM	83	(France) Maxime Grau	1
Laurense Motors Kawasaki Racing Team	Kawasaki	88	(Netherlands) Eric van Helvoirt	All
	KTM	98	(Netherlands) Dylan Kroon	2–3
	Yamaha	101	(Netherlands) Mirco ten Kate	All
	Yamaha	104	(Netherlands) Nick Kouwenberg	3
Twenty Racing Suspension Gas Gas	Gas Gas	111	(Netherlands) Damien Knuiman	All
VNT Racing KTM	KTM	114	(Belgium) Nicolas Vennekens	All
Andre Motors	KTM	120	(Netherlands) Alex van Weerdenburg	1, 3
	KTM	124	(Netherlands) Didier van Kasteren	3
Vd Laar Racing	KTM	129	(Netherlands) Jesse Schel	2–3
Hannamax Motorsport	KTM	130	(Netherlands) René de Jong	All
Care Innovation Racing Team	KTM	145	(Netherlands) Jeroen Bussink	All
KTM BTS Racing Team	KTM	151	(Spain) Oriol Oliver	1
KTM BTS Racing Team	KTM	563	(Belgium) Wesly Dieudonné	1
Powerhouse Superstore	Yamaha	164	(Netherlands) Remy van Alebeek	2–3
Van Venrooy KTM Racing	KTM	172	(Netherlands) Cas Valk	All
Honda HRC	Honda	173	(Italy) Ferruccio Zanchi	1
Team Hannamax Motorsport	Yamaha	199	(Netherlands) Joshua van der Linden	1–2
Postévi Capital	KTM	221	(Netherlands) Wout Jordans	1
	KTM	242	(Netherlands) Boris Slot	1, 3
KTM Silve Racing	KTM	358	(Finland) Nico Stenberg	1
KTM Silve Racing	KTM	418	(Finland) Saku Mansikkamäki	1
	Gas Gas	375	(Netherlands) Reggy de Koster	2–3
RT400 MX Team	Gas Gas	400	(Netherlands) Roan Tolsma	All
Dörr Motorsport Triumph Racing Team	Triumph	408	(Netherlands) Scott Smulders	1
GripMesser Racing Team	Gas Gas	427	(Netherlands) Mick Kennedy	1
Grizzly Racing Service	KTM	469	(Netherlands) Ryan de Beer	1–2
Grizzly Racing Service	KTM	505	(Israel) Ben Almagor	1, 3
Husqvarna Scandinavia/Cross Centeret Snellingen	Husqvarna	471	(Norway) Pelle Gundersen	1
Motopalvelu KTM	KTM	480	(Finland) Kasimir Hindersson	1
Brouwer Motors	KTM	485	(Netherlands) Senna van Voorst	All
D.V.S Junior Racing	TM	524	(Belgium) Emile De Baere	3
Becker Racing	KTM	529	(Belgium) Maxime Lucas	1
	KTM	537	(Netherlands) Damian Wedage	All
	KTM	538	(Netherlands) Bryan Nelis	2
	Sherco	555	(Netherlands) Max Schwarte	All
Gabriel SS24 KTM Factory Juniors	KTM	574	(Netherlands) Gyan Doensen	2
	Gas Gas	611	(Latvia) Markuss Kokins	1–2
Bewo Fantic	Fantic	621	(Netherlands) Klaas Jan Kruisselbrink	All
Motostar Yamaha	Yamaha	641	(Sweden) Edvin Olstrand	1
Van der Wardt Bouw	TM	715	(Netherlands) Jaap Janssen	All
SixtySeven Racing Team	Husqvarna	724	(Netherlands) Jaymian Ramakers	1
VHR VRT Yamaha Official EMX250 Team	Yamaha	772	(Latvia) Jānis Reišulis	1–2
Pol Motors	Gas Gas	812	(Netherlands) Sem de Lange	1
WPM KTM Team	KTM	814	(Netherlands) Maik Verhoef	1–2
Care Innovation Racing Team	KTM	820	(Germany) Dennis Wiemann	1
	KTM	911	(Netherlands) Henk Pater	1–2

=== Riders Championship ===
Points are awarded to finishers of the main races, in the following format:

Position	1st	2nd	3rd	4th	5th	6th	7th	8th	9th	10th	11th	12th	13th	14th	15th	16th	17th	18th	19th	20th+
Points	25	22	20	18	16	15	14	13	12	11	10	9	8	7	6	5	4	3	2	1

Pos	Rider	Bike	HAR (Gelderland)		OLD (Gelderland)		MAR (Overijssel)		Points
1	(Netherlands) Cas Valk	KTM	1	1	1	1	1	1	150
2	(Netherlands) Damien Knuiman	Gas Gas	10	9	8	4	3	4	92
3	(Spain) David Braceras	Honda	3	3	2	15			68
4	(Netherlands) Jeroen Bussink	KTM	12	10	14	14	5	5	66
5	(Norway) Sander Agard-Michelsen	KTM	11	30	11	6	12	3	65
6	(Latvia) Jānis Reišulis	Yamaha	2	40	3	3			63
7	(Hungary) Noel Zanócz	Honda	7	5	5	5			62
8	(Netherlands) Senna van Voorst	KTM	21	14	12	12	6	6	56
9	(Netherlands) Damian Wedage	KTM	36	22	10	10	8	7	51
10	(Netherlands) Mirco ten Kate	Yamaha	13	25	9	Ret	4	9	51
11	(Netherlands) Roan Tolsma	Gas Gas	26	15	15	11	9	8	48
12	(Netherlands) Kay Karssemakers	Kawasaki					2	2	44
13	(Norway) Håkon Østerhagen	Fantic	18	11	4	8			44
14	(Netherlands) René de Jong	KTM	14	20	13	16	10	10	43
15	(Latvia) Kārlis Reišulis	Yamaha			7	2			36
16	(Spain) Oriol Oliver	KTM	4	4					36
17	(Netherlands) Greg van der Weide	Triumph	16	13	35	35	14	11	32
18	(Netherlands) Rick Elzinga	Yamaha	6	6					30
19	(France) Maxime Grau	KTM	5	7					30
20	(Netherlands) Gyan Doensen	KTM			6	7			29
21	(Belgium) Nicolas Vennekens	KTM	DNQ	34	16	13	7	34	29
22	(Netherlands) Scott Smulders	Triumph	8	8					26
23	(Italy) Ferruccio Zanchi	Honda	35	2					23
24	(Netherlands) Eric van Helvoirt	Kawasaki	27	33	32	17	15	13	21
25	(Netherlands) Bradley Mesters	KTM	9	16					17
26	(Latvia) Markuss Kokins	Gas Gas	33	18	Ret	9			16
27	(United Kingdom) Marcus-Lee Soper	Yamaha	25	38	26	25	16	14	16
28	(Netherlands) Nick Kouwenberg	Yamaha					11	19	12
29	(Netherlands) Roan Bekkers	KTM					19	12	11
30	(Israel) Ben Almagor	KTM	DNQ	32			17	15	11
31	(Finland) Saku Mansikkamäki	KTM	37	12					10
32	(Netherlands) Jaap Janssen	TM	DNQ	DNQ	18	18	20	18	10
33	(Belgium) Emile De Baere	TM					13	33	9
34	(Netherlands) Mats Leeuwesteijn	Husqvarna	28	29			37	16	8
35	(Finland) Kasimir Hindersson	KTM	15	19					8
36	(Netherlands) Max Schwarte	KTM	30	35	Ret	DNS	22	17	7
37	(Netherlands) Joshua van der Linden	Yamaha	19	23	17	Ret			7
38	(Netherlands) Jordy van Orsouw	KTM	31	31	25	24	38	23	6
39	(Belgium) Maxime Lucas	KTM	32	17					5
40	(Finland) Nico Stenberg	KTM	17	21					5
41	(Netherlands) Damian Bergevoet	KTM			28	23	18	Ret	5
42	(Netherlands) Ivo Pol	Yamaha			24	26	33	20	4
43	(Netherlands) Wessel van Wijk	KTM	23	28	22	21			4
44	(Netherlands) Svenn Borger	Yamaha			20	34	26	22	4
45	(Netherlands) Twan de Weerd	KTM			27	28	28	24	4
46	(Netherlands) Thijs Schroder	KTM	DNQ	DNQ	30	27	27	25	4
47	(Netherlands) Remy van Alebeek	Yamaha			29	33	29	28	4
48	(Netherlands) Jesse Schel	KTM			21	19	24	Ret	4
49	(Netherlands) Bryan Nelis	KTM			19	20			3
50	(Netherlands) Reggy de Koster	Gas Gas			Ret	29	25	21	3
51	(United Kingdom) Jake Davies	Fantic	DNQ	DNQ	34	DNS	23	26	3
52	(Netherlands) Klaas Jan Kruisselbrink	Fantic	DNQ	DNQ	Ret	31	30	27	3
53	(Netherlands) Dylan Kroon	KTM			23	22	21	Ret	3
54	(Netherlands) Jarno Duineveld	Suzuki			33	32	36	DNS	3
55	(Netherlands) Ryan de Beer	KTM	24	24	DNS	DNS			2
56	(Netherlands) Mick Kennedy	Gas Gas	22	26					2
57	(Netherlands) Sem de Lange	Gas Gas	20	27					2
58	(Netherlands) Boris Slot	KTM	DNQ	DNQ			32	29	2
59	(Netherlands) Didier van Kasteren	KTM					31	30	2
60	(Netherlands) Maik Verhoef	KTM	DNQ	DNQ	31	30			2
61	(Netherlands) Alex van Weerdenburg	KTM	DNQ	DNQ			34	31	2
62	(Netherlands) Joep Poland	KTM					35	32	2
63	(Sweden) Adam Fridlund	Fantic	38	36					2
64	(Netherlands) Jaymian Ramakers	Husqvarna	29	37					2
65	(Belgium) Wesly Dieudonné	KTM	34	39					2
66	(Germany) Dennis Wiemann	KTM	39	DNS					1
67	(Norway) Pelle Gundersen	Husqvarna	40	DNS					1
	(Netherlands) Henk Pater	KTM	DNQ	DNQ	Ret	DNS			0
	(Sweden) Axel Lars Isgren	Kawasaki	DNQ	DNQ					0
	(Sweden) Edvin Olstrand	Yamaha	DNQ	DNQ					0
	(Netherlands) Wout Jordans	KTM	DNQ	DNQ					0
Pos	Rider	Bike	HAR (Gelderland)		OLD (Gelderland)		MAR (Overijssel)		Points
