= Dutch Masters of Motocross =

Dutch Motocross Championship

- Dutch Masters of Motocross logo
- Category: Motocross
- Country: Netherlands
- Inaugural season: 2016

The Dutch Masters of Motocross (DMoMX) is the premier domestic Dutch Motocross series, sanctioned by the Koninklijke Nederlandse Motorrijders Vereniging.

The series runs annually throughout spring each year and typically consists of 3-4 rounds. The premier classes are the 500cc and 250cc but there are also classes for younger riders on 125cc and 85cc motorcycles.

Up to the end of the 2015 season, the series was known as the Open Dutch Motocross Championship (ONK). The series was renamed in 2016 in a bid by the KNMV to increase the international status of the championship and attract more riders from the FIM Motocross World Championship. The ONK championship resumed in 2017 separately to the Dutch Masters of Motocross, with the series catering for national-level riders predominantly.

== History ==
Under the original guise of the Open Dutch Motocross Championship, the first national motocross championship took place in 1949, running annually up until the end of the 2015 season. After a fall in the interest of international riders in competing in the series over the previous seasons, the national federation (KNMV) took the decision reconstruct the series from the 2016 season onwards.

This resulted in the renaming of the championship to the Dutch Masters of Motocross and the changing of the championship classes to the following:

- 85cc (motors up to 85cc, for the youngest riders)
- 125cc (engines up to 125cc, for junior riders)
- 250cc (engines up to 250cc)
- 500cc (engines up to 500cc)

In its opening season, the championship consisted of five events but in recent years it has had three events. Jeffrey Herlings has been the most successful rider since the re-structuring of the championship in 2016, picking up six titles.

== Event Format ==
Rounds of the Dutch Masters of Motocross typically have a single day format. Each class has a combined free and timed practice session in the morning, with the times from the timed practice session acting as the qualifying positions for the main races. Following on from this, all four classes have two races each, with the overall winner being the rider with the highest aggregate score from those races. The senior classes (500cc & 250cc) have 25 minute plus one lap races whilst the junior classes (125cc & 85cc) have 20 minute plus one lap races.

Points are awarded to finishers of the main races, in the following format:

Position	1st	2nd	3rd	4th	5th	6th	7th	8th	9th	10th	11th	12th	13th	14th	15th	16th	17th	18th	19th	20th +
Points	25	22	20	18	16	15	14	13	12	11	10	9	8	7	6	5	4	3	2	1

== List of Champions ==
Season	500cc Champion	250cc Champion	125cc Champion	85cc Champion
2026	(Netherlands) Jeffrey Herlings (Honda)	(Latvia) Kārlis Reišulis (Yamaha)	(Netherlands) Timo Heuver (Fantic)	(Germany) Luca Nierychlo (KTM)
2025	(France) Romain Febvre (Kawasaki)	(Netherlands) Cas Valk (KTM)	(Belgium) Douwe Van Mechgelen (Fantic)	(Denmark) Casey Karstrøm (KTM)
2024	(Netherlands) Jeffrey Herlings (KTM)	(Netherlands) Rick Elzinga (Yamaha)	(Netherlands) Gyan Doensen (KTM)	(Netherlands) Timo Heuver (KTM)
2023	(Netherlands) Jeffrey Herlings (KTM)	(Netherlands) Kay de Wolf (Husqvarna)	(Latvia) Jānis Reišulis (Yamaha)	(Netherlands) Dani Heitink (Husqvarna)
2022	(Netherlands) Calvin Vlaanderen (Yamaha)	(Netherlands) Rick Elzinga (Yamaha)	(Latvia) Jānis Reišulis (KTM)	(Netherlands) Gyan Doensen (Husqvarna)
2021	Cancelled due to COVID-19 pandemic			
2020	Cancelled due to COVID-19 pandemic			
2019	(Lithuania) Arminas Jasikonis (Husqvarna)	(Germany) Henry Jacobi (Kawasaki)	(Netherlands) Kay de Wolf (Husqvarna)	(Netherlands) Cas Valk (Husqvarna)
2018	(Netherlands) Jeffrey Herlings (KTM)	(Belgium) Jago Geerts (Yamaha)	(Finland) Emil Weckman (KTM)	(Netherlands) Kay de Wolf (KTM)
2017	(Netherlands) Jeffrey Herlings (KTM)	(Denmark) Thomas Kjær Olsen (Husqvarna)	(Denmark) Mikkel Haarup (Husqvarna)	(Netherlands) Kay de Wolf (KTM)
2016	(Russia) Evgeny Bobryshev (Honda)	(Netherlands) Jeffrey Herlings (KTM)	(Belgium) Jago Geerts (KTM)	(Sweden) Emil Jönrup (KTM)
