= 2024 Dutch Masters of Motocross =

Dutch Motocross Competition in 2024

The 2024 Dutch Masters of Motocross season was the 7th Dutch Masters of Motocross season.

The series consisted of three rounds across the eastern part of The Netherlands, running from March to the end of April. Jeffrey Herlings was the reigning champion in the 500cc class, after he recorded a perfect season during the 2023 championship. Herlings was able to successfully defend his title, winning all but one race during the course of the season. As this gave him his fifth Dutch Masters of Motocross title, he became the most successful rider in the history of the series from its inception in 2016.

Kay de Wolf went into the season as the defending champion in the 250cc class, after picking up his fourth Dutch Masters title in the previous year. Due to his focus on the 2024 FIM Motocross World Championship, de Wolf opted to not defend his title. Rick Elzinga was able to win his second title in the 250cc class by a single point after a tight championship battle with Cas Valk.

== Race calendar and results ==
=== 500cc ===
Round	Date	Location	Race 1 Winner	Race 2 Winner	Round Winner
1	17 March	(Gelderland) Harfsen	(Netherlands) Jeffrey Herlings	(Netherlands) Jeffrey Herlings	(Netherlands) Jeffrey Herlings
2	1 April	(Gelderland) Oldebroek	(Netherlands) Jeffrey Herlings	(Netherlands) Jeffrey Herlings	(Netherlands) Jeffrey Herlings
3	21 April	(Overijssel) Markelo	(France) Romain Febvre	(Netherlands) Jeffrey Herlings	(France) Romain Febvre

=== 250cc ===
Round	Date	Location	Race 1 Winner	Race 2 Winner	Round Winner
1	17 March	(Gelderland) Harfsen	(Netherlands) Cas Valk	(Netherlands) Cas Valk	(Netherlands) Cas Valk
2	1 April	(Gelderland) Oldebroek	(France) Thibault Benistant	(France) Thibault Benistant	(France) Thibault Benistant
3	21 April	(Overijssel) Markelo	(Netherlands) Rick Elzinga	(France) Thibault Benistant	(Netherlands) Rick Elzinga

=== Circuit locations ===
2024 Dutch Masters of Motocross locations

== 500cc ==
=== Participants ===
Team	Constructor	No	Rider	Rounds
Kawasaki Racing Team MXGP	Kawasaki	3	(France) Romain Febvre	All
MX Team van Hout	KTM	4	(Netherlands) Leon van Hout	All
	Yamaha	6	(Netherlands) Lars Looman	All
Monster Energy Yamaha Factory MXGP Team	Yamaha	10	(Netherlands) Calvin Vlaanderen	All
	Honda	14	(Belgium) Thallon Caspermans	2
WLM Design - Laurense Motors	KTM	15	(Netherlands) Erik de Bruyn	All
De Baets Yamaha MX Team	Yamaha	16	(France) Benoît Paturel	3
	Husqvarna	18	(Netherlands) Berjn Eckelboom	1–2
	Honda	23	(Netherlands) Menno Aussems	All
Van de Laar Racing	KTM	24	(Netherlands) Jordy van Orsouw	1–2
GW Brink Metaal Recycling	Yamaha	26	(Netherlands) Pim Sluiter	All
Husqvarna SKS Racing	Husqvarna	28	(Netherlands) Jorn Weeren	2
	KTM	30	(Netherlands) Rene de Jong	1, 3
	KTM	31	(Belgium) Jorre Hermans	3
JH-MX Service	Gas Gas	34	(Netherlands) Micha-Boy de Waal	All
JM Honda Racing	Honda	37	(Sweden) Tim Edberg	2
Camping Cupido	Yamaha	38	(Netherlands) Marcel Conijn	All
Team Husqvarna Scandinavia	Husqvarna	51	(Sweden) Albin Gerhardsson	1
Red Bull KTM South Africa	KTM	52	(South Africa) Cameron Durow	1
HM Racing Team	Husqvarna	71	(Germany) Fynn-Niklas Tornau	1
	Kawasaki	72	(United Kingdom) Mitchell Meadows	3
Sahkar Racing	KTM	75	(Estonia) Hardi Roosiorg	2
Buitenhuis Racing	Yamaha	77	(Netherlands) Kevin Buitenhuis	All
Buitenhuis Racing	Yamaha	177	(United States) Tyler Stepek	2
Buitenhuis Racing	Yamaha	522	(Netherlands) Rob Windt	2
	Husqvarna	83	(Netherlands) Edo Bosch	2–3
Red Bull KTM Factory Racing	KTM	84	(Netherlands) Jeffrey Herlings	All
MX88 Motorsport	KTM	88	(Netherlands) Freek van der Vlist	All
	Yamaha	101	(Netherlands) Jelke Baarda	1, 3
Eastwood Racing Honda	Honda	103	(United Kingdom) Max Broadbelt	1–2
Team Ship to Cycle Honda Motoblouz SR	Honda	107	(Netherlands) Lars van Berkel	1
Cat Moto Bauerschmidt Husqvarna	Husqvarna	108	(Germany) Stefan Ekerold	1
Van der Velden Motoren	KTM	118	(Netherlands) Joël van Mechelen	2–3
Pro-Race Ferro Recycling Team	Husqvarna	121	(Netherlands) Mitchel van den Essenburg	1, 3
MotoLand Seclin	KTM	134	(Belgium) Mattéo Puffet	3
JTX Racing Team	KTM	136	(Netherlands) Loeka Thonies	2–3
JTX Racing Team	KTM	152	(Bulgaria) Petar Petrov	All
KTM Silve Racing	KTM	142	(Finland) Jere Haavisto	1–2
	KTM	145	(Netherlands) Jeroen Bussink	All
KTM Sarholz Racing Team	KTM	149	(Germany) Dennis Ullrich	
Van Klinken MX Sports	Gas Gas	170	(Netherlands) Joey van Klinken	2
	KTM	192	(Netherlands) Youri van't Ende	All
je68 KTM	KTM	198	(Sweden) Jesper Hansson	1
Sigmans Yamaha	Yamaha	217	(Netherlands) Teun Cooymans	All
Enduro Koch Racing	Husqvarna	224	(Czech Republic) Jakub Terešák	1–2
Brouwer Motors	KTM	241	(Netherlands) Michel Hoenson	2–3
	KTM	244	(Germany) Max Bülow	1
Lexa MX Racing Team	Husqvarna	249	(United Kingdom) John Adamson	1–2
Nobis MX Team	KTM	303	(Netherlands) Krijn van Vroenhoven	3
Team SHR Motorsports	Yamaha	313	(Czech Republic) Petr Polák	2
Team SHR Motorsports	Yamaha	491	(Germany) Paul Haberland	2
Team SHR Motorsports	Yamaha	822	(Netherlands) Mike Bolink	1–2
Gabriel SS24 KTM	KTM	326	(United Kingdom) Josh Gilbert	3
	Yamaha	336	(Netherlands) Mika Ritsema	1, 3
	KTM	375	(Netherlands) Reggy de Koster	All
Nilssons MC Gas Gas	Gas Gas	397	(Sweden) Axel Nilsson	1
Twenty Racing Suspension Gas Gas	KTM	444	(Netherlands) Jeremy Knuiman	1–2
Fantic Nederland/MVDecals MX Team	Fantic	521	(Netherlands) Boris Blanken	All
	Husqvarna	575	(Netherlands) Calvin te Vaarwerk	All
De Dakencentrale BV	Yamaha	611	(Netherlands) Patrick Tuin	1, 3
OPTIFLEX Technisch Beheer	Yamaha	701	(Netherlands) Sjaak Taskin	1
Schmicker Racing	KTM	811	(United Kingdom) Adam Sterry	1
AMX Racing Team	KTM	817	(Netherlands) Raf Meuwissen	1–2
	Yamaha	825	(Netherlands) Sven Post	All
Kapers Motoren	TM	826	(Netherlands) Nick Leerkes	All
Laurense Motors	Kawasaki	841	(Netherlands) Robert Fobbe	All
NGR Racing Products	KTM	843	(Netherlands) Daniël Wendels	1–2
APM Metaalservice	Yamaha	867	(Belgium) Dimitri van de Sanden	All
VisuAlz Production by SAS Kawasaki	Kawasaki	891	(Germany) Paul Ullrich	1–2
	KTM	969	(Netherlands) Boyd Otten	1

=== Riders Championship ===
Points are awarded to finishers of the main races, in the following format:

Position	1st	2nd	3rd	4th	5th	6th	7th	8th	9th	10th	11th	12th	13th	14th	15th	16th	17th	18th	19th	20th+
Points	25	22	20	18	16	15	14	13	12	11	10	9	8	7	6	5	4	3	2	1

Pos	Rider	Bike	HAR (Gelderland)		OLD (Gelderland)		MAR (Overijssel)		Points
1	(Netherlands) Jeffrey Herlings	KTM	1	1	1	1	3	1	145
2	(France) Romain Febvre	Kawasaki	2	2	2	2	1	2	135
3	(Netherlands) Calvin Vlaanderen	Yamaha	3	3	3	3	2	3	122
4	(Netherlands) Micha-Boy de Waal	Gas Gas	9	9	5	5	4	4	92
5	(Netherlands) Freek van der Vlist	KTM	6	6	6	7	8	7	86
6	(Finland) Jere Haavisto	KTM	4	4	4	4			72
7	(Bulgaria) Petar Petrov	KTM	19	7	7	6	6	Ret	60
8	(Netherlands) Marcel Conijn	Yamaha	14	13	10	9	16	8	56
9	(Netherlands) Jeremy Knuiman	Gas Gas	5	8	8	11			52
10	(United Kingdom) John Adamson	Husqvarna	10	12	11	8			43
11	(Czech Republic) Jakub Terešák	Husqvarna	11	20	9	10			34
12	(Netherlands) Nick Leerkes	TM	18	14	13	17	10	Ret	33
13	(United Kingdom) Josh Gilbert	KTM					5	5	32
14	(Netherlands) Jeroen Bussink	KTM	15	19	19	14	15	12	32
15	(Netherlands) Joël van Mechelen	KTM			18	13	12	10	31
16	(Netherlands) Boris Blanken	Fantic	22	Ret	Ret	DNS	7	6	30
17	(United Kingdom) Adam Sterry	KTM	8	5					29
18	(Netherlands) Rene de Jong	KTM	20	21			9	9	26
19	(Netherlands) Robert Fobbe	Kawasaki	12	11	DNQ	DNQ	26	15	26
20	(Sweden) Albin Gerhardsson	Husqvarna	7	10					25
21	(Netherlands) Mitchel van den Essenburg	Husqvarna	21	15			11	17	21
22	(Netherlands) Youri van't Ende	KTM	25	24	21	16	17	13	20
23	(Belgium) Mattéo Puffet	KTM					13	11	18
24	(Netherlands) Loeka Thonies	KTM			20	19	14	14	17
25	(Netherlands) Mike Bolink	Yamaha	26	18	14	15			17
26	(Czech Republic) Petr Polák	Yamaha			16	12			14
27	(Netherlands) Michel Hoenson	KTM			23	18	28	16	10
28	(Belgium) Dimitri van de Sanden	Yamaha	28	25	24	20	18	18	10
29	(Netherlands) Lars van Berkel	Honda	17	16					9
30	(Estonia) Hardi Roosiorg	KTM			12	Ret			9
31	(Netherlands) Raf Meuwissen	KTM	13	Ret	Ret	DNS			8
32	(Netherlands) Calvin te Vaarwerk	Husqvarna	35	31	30	26	21	19	7
33	(Netherlands) Lars Looman	Yamaha	32	26	22	30	19	24	7
34	(Sweden) Tim Edberg	Honda			15	DNS			6
35	(Netherlands) Kevin Buitenhuis	Yamaha	36	34	33	28	23	22	6
36	(Netherlands) Teun Cooymans	Yamaha	23	29	26	22	20	23	6
37	(South Africa) Cameron Durow	KTM	16	27					6
38	(Germany) Stefan Ekerold	Husqvarna	24	17					5
39	(Netherlands) Reggy de Koster	KTM	Ret	36	31	27	29	21	5
40	(Germany) Paul Haberland	Yamaha			17	25			5
41	(Netherlands) Jordy van Orsouw	KTM	29	23	25	21			4
42	(Netherlands) Erik de Bruyn	KTM	30	32	Ret	23	DNS	25	4
43	(Netherlands) Edo Bosch	Husqvarna			36	31	30	28	4
44	(Netherlands) Mika Ritsema	Yamaha	39	37			Ret	27	3
45	(Netherlands) Leon van Hout	KTM	DNQ	DNQ	32	32	Ret	29	3
46	(Germany) Paul Ullrich	Kawasaki	37	Ret	34	29			3
47	(Netherlands) Krijn van Vroenhoven	KTM					22	20	2
48	(Sweden) Axel Nilsson	Gas Gas	31	22					2
49	(Belgium) Thallon Caspermans	Honda			27	24			2
50	(Belgium) Jorre Hermans	KTM					24	26	2
51	(Germany) Fynn-Niklas Tornau	Husqvarna	33	28					2
52	(United Kingdom) Mitchell Meadows	Kawasaki					32	30	2
53	(Netherlands) Sven Post	Yamaha	DNQ	DNQ	DNQ	DNQ	31	31	2
54	(Sweden) Jesper Hansson	KTM	27	30					2
55	(Netherlands) Jelke Baarda	Yamaha	DNQ	DNQ			27	32	2
56	(United Kingdom) Max Broadbelt	Honda	34	35	Ret	Ret			2
57	(Germany) Max Bülow	KTM	38	33					2
58	(Netherlands) Patrick Tuin	Yamaha	DNQ	DNQ			25	Ret	1
59	(Netherlands) Pim Sluiter	Yamaha	DNQ	DNQ	DNQ	DNQ	33	Ret	1
60	(Netherlands) Jorn Weeren	Husqvarna			29	Ret			1
61	(United States) Tyler Stepek	Yamaha			28	Ret			1
62	(Netherlands) Joey van Klinken	Gas Gas			35	Ret			1
	(Netherlands) Menno Aussems	Honda	DNQ	DNQ	DNQ	DNQ	Ret	DNS	0
	(Netherlands) Rob Windt	Yamaha			DNS	DNS			0
	(France) Benoît Paturel	Yamaha					DNS	DNS	0
	(Netherlands) Daniël Wendels	KTM	DNQ	DNQ	DNQ	DNQ			0
	(Netherlands) Berjn Eckelboom	Husqvarna	DNQ	DNQ	DNQ	DNQ			0
	(Netherlands) Boyd Otten	KTM	DNQ	DNQ					0
	(Netherlands) Sjaak Taskin	Yamaha	DNQ	DNQ					0
Pos	Rider	Bike	HAR (Gelderland)		OLD (Gelderland)		MAR (Overijssel)		Points

== 250cc ==
=== Participants ===
Team	Constructor	No	Rider	Rounds
Duntep MX	Husqvarna	3	(Netherlands) Sander Hofstede	All
Schmicker Racing	KTM	12	(Netherlands) Dave Kooiker	1
Klok Dakkapellen/Arcabo	Yamaha	15	(Netherlands) Svenn Borger	All
Smienk Racing Team	KTM	19	(Netherlands) Wessel Smienk	2–3
	KTM	21	(Netherlands) Greg van der Weide	1, 3
JP Xtreme Xperience	KTM	29	(Norway) Sander Agard-Michelsen	All
JP Xtreme Xperience	KTM	354	(Netherlands) Ruben Koskamp	All
JP Xtreme Xperience	KTM	487	(Norway) Elias Auclair	1
JP Xtreme Xperience	KTM	644	(Netherlands) Thijs Schroder	3
	Husqvarna	30	(Netherlands) Mats Leeuwesteijn	1, 3
SV Motorsport	Yamaha	32	(United Kingdom) Marcus-Lee Soper	2–3
Fantic Factory Racing MX2	Fantic	33	(Netherlands) Kay Karssemakers	2–3
Bruggen Tweewielers	Yamaha	35	(Netherlands) Ward Monkel	All
Hofstede MX Team	Husqvarna	38	(Netherlands) Karl Timmerman	All
Hofstede MX Team	Husqvarna	86	(Netherlands) Jesper Gils	All
TDW MotoParts	KTM	42	(Netherlands) Twan de Weerd	3
Monster Energy Yamaha Factory MX2 Team	Yamaha	44	(Netherlands) Rick Elzinga	All
Monster Energy Yamaha Factory MX2 Team	Yamaha	198	(France) Thibault Benistant	2–3
	KTM	46	(Netherlands) Jay Raamsteeboers	2
Team VRT Yamaha Racing	Yamaha	47	(Latvia) Kārlis Reišulis	2
Team VRT Yamaha Racing	Yamaha	432	(Netherlands) Ivano van Erp	2
Team VRT Yamaha Racing	Yamaha	772	(Latvia) Jānis Reišulis	2
Brouwer Motors	Husqvarna	49	(Netherlands) Wessel van Wijk	1, 3
	KTM	64	(Netherlands) Bart Poland	1
KTM Kosak Racing	KTM	75	(Netherlands) Bradley Mesters	1–2
Heli Motors	Gas Gas	84	(Netherlands) Boyd van der Voorn	2–3
	Gas Gas	88	(Netherlands) Eric van Helvoirt	All
	KTM	98	(Netherlands) Dylan Kroon	All
	KTM	100	(Netherlands) Danny van den Bosse	1
Arcabo Ten Kate Motoren	Honda	101	(Netherlands) Mirco ten Kate	All
Twenty Racing Suspension Gas Gas	Gas Gas	111	(Netherlands) Damien Knuiman	1–2
Vema Beton	Gas Gas	114	(Belgium) Nicolas Vennekens	1
AIT Racing Team	KTM	123	(Italy) Federico Tuani	All
AIT Racing Team	KTM	150	(France) Xavier Cazal	1–2
Hannamax Motorsport	KTM	124	(Netherlands) Didier van Kasteren	2
	Fantic	127	(Netherlands) Mats Danenberg	1
	KTM	131	(Poland) Damian Zdunek	1
	Yamaha	138	(Netherlands) Patrick van Pelt	3
Young Motion powered by Resa	KTM	142	(Finland) Sampo Rainio	1–2
Young Motion powered by Resa	KTM	338	(Sweden) Filip Olsson	1–2
Young Motion powered by Resa	Gas Gas	505	(Sweden) Arvid Lüning	1–2
WZ Racing KTM	KTM	151	(Spain) Oriol Oliver	1–2
WZ Racing KTM	KTM	262	(Australia) Ryan Alexanderson	1–2
WZ Racing KTM	KTM	427	(Norway) Håkon Fredriksen	1
VS Benelux	Yamaha	164	(Netherlands) Remy van Alebeek	2
	KTM	167	(Netherlands) Levi Schrik	1–2
Gabriel SS24 KTM	KTM	172	(Netherlands) Cas Valk	All
Ovaa Motors	Husqvarna	197	(Netherlands) Jordan-Lee van Maaren	All
Hannamax Motorsport Team	Yamaha	199	(Netherlands) Joshua van der Linden	1, 3
GT Husqvarna MX Team	Husqvarna	201	(Netherlands) Robin van Oldeniel	All
	TM	210	(Netherlands) Lucas Dolfing	1–2
JM Honda Racing	Honda	214	(Norway) Håkon Østerhagen	1, 3
JM Honda Racing	Honda	494	(Germany) Maximilian Werner	All
	KTM	221	(Netherlands) Wout Jordans	All
	KTM	222	(Republic of Ireland) Jake Sheridan	3
Lexa MX Racing Team	Husqvarna	285	(United Kingdom) Calum Mitchell	1–2
Lexa MX Racing Team	Husqvarna	421	(United Kingdom) Bayliss Utting	1
	KTM	310	(Estonia) Richard Paat	1–2
JM Racing Astra Honda	Honda	325	(Indonesia) Delvintor Alfarizi	3
Mulderen FlevoTrans B.V. Tollebeek	Husqvarna	400	(Netherlands) Roan Tolsma	All
KMP Honda Racing powered by Krettek	Honda	408	(Netherlands) Scott Smulders	1–2
AVT Campers	KTM	410	(United Kingdom) James Barker	All
	KTM	411	(United Kingdom) Shaun Mahoney	1
Mellendijk Motorparts	KTM	419	(Netherlands) Jan Spliethof	All
Hannamax Motorsport	KTM	422	(Netherlands) Tyler Eltink	3
Husqvarna South Africa	Husqvarna	442	(South Africa) Barend Du Toit	1
MX-Handel Racing	Husqvarna	444	(Estonia) Sebastian Leok	1
Grizzly Racing	KTM	469	(Netherlands) Ryan de Beer	3
AMX Racing Team	Husqvarna	474	(Denmark) Magnus Gregersen	2
Brouwer Motors	KTM	485	(Netherlands) Senna van Voorst	All
Schepers Racing	KTM	488	(Netherlands) Sven Dijk	All
	KTM	521	(Netherlands) Rick Wichertjes	All
RX Moto Husqvarna	Husqvarna	524	(Finland) Miro Varjonen	1
Brouwer Motors	KTM	537	(Netherlands) Damian Wedage	All
DAM Racing	KTM	563	(Belgium) Wesly Dieudonné	1
Motor Centrum Eibergen	KTM	555	(Netherlands) Max Schwarte	1–2
Motor2000 KTM Racing Team	KTM	601	(United Kingdom) Kelton Gwyther	All
K-Tech Aristo Cars Racing	KTM	616	(United Kingdom) Ollie Colmer	1
Joramo Offroad Shop/Husqvarna Benelux	Husqvarna	634	(Belgium) Maeron Peeters	1–2
Van der Wardt Bouw	KTM	715	(Netherlands) Jaap Janssen	All
	Gas Gas	722	(Netherlands) Jarno Bleekman	3
	KTM	726	(Netherlands) Xander Vossebeld	1–2
Pol Motors	Gas Gas	812	(Netherlands) Sem de Lange	1
WPM KTM Team	KTM	814	(Netherlands) Maik Verhoef	1

=== Riders Championship ===
Points are awarded to finishers of the main races, in the following format:

Position	1st	2nd	3rd	4th	5th	6th	7th	8th	9th	10th	11th	12th	13th	14th	15th	16th	17th	18th	19th	20th+
Points	25	22	20	18	16	15	14	13	12	11	10	9	8	7	6	5	4	3	2	1

Pos	Rider	Bike	HAR (Gelderland)		OLD (Gelderland)		MAR (Overijssel)		Points
1	(Netherlands) Rick Elzinga	Yamaha	2	3	3	3	1	2	129
2	(Netherlands) Cas Valk	KTM	1	1	4	4	2	3	128
3	(France) Thibault Benistant	Yamaha			1	1	3	1	95
4	(Norway) Sander Agard-Michelsen	KTM	10	8	8	10	4	6	81
5	(Germany) Maximilian Werner	Honda	6	7	12	12	5	8	76
6	(Spain) Oriol Oliver	KTM	4	2	7	5			70
7	(Netherlands) Bradley Mesters	KTM	5	5	10	7			57
8	(Latvia) Jānis Reišulis	Yamaha			2	2			44
9	(Netherlands) Kay Karssemakers	Fantic			9	Ret	6	5	43
10	(Norway) Håkon Østerhagen	Honda	14	23			7	4	40
11	(Norway) Håkon Fredriksen	KTM	3	4					38
12	(Netherlands) Damian Wedage	KTM	16	20	18	11	18	7	36
13	(Netherlands) Roan Tolsma	Husqvarna	28	17	16	18	8	13	34
14	(Netherlands) Damien Knuiman	Gas Gas	15	15	14	8			32
15	(Sweden) Arvid Lüning	Gas Gas	8	12	17	15			32
16	(Netherlands) Ivano van Erp	Yamaha			6	6			30
17	(Netherlands) Mirco ten Kate	Honda	Ret	13	19	23	9	14	30
18	(Netherlands) Dave Kooiker	KTM	7	6					29
19	(Finland) Sampo Rainio	KTM	13	9	13	Ret			28
20	(Netherlands) Robin van Oldeniel	Husqvarna	17	Ret	DNS	DNS	10	9	27
21	(Italy) Federico Tuani	KTM	30	Ret	25	17	12	10	26
22	(Australia) Ryan Alexanderson	KTM	DNQ	DNQ	11	9			22
23	(Netherlands) Greg van der Weide	KTM	22	24			11	11	22
24	(Netherlands) Scott Smulders	Honda	12	10	20	20			20
25	(United Kingdom) Calum Mitchell	Husqvarna	11	11	26	DSQ			21
26	(Sweden) Filip Olsson	KTM	32	14	31	13			17
27	(Netherlands) Joshua van der Linden	Yamaha	23	Ret			15	12	16
28	(Latvia) Kārlis Reišulis	Yamaha			5	Ret			16
29	(Netherlands) Tyler Eltink	KTM					13	15	14
30	(Netherlands) Sander Hofstede	Husqvarna	34	21	Ret	22	14	17	14
31	(Denmark) Magnus Gregersen	Husqvarna			15	14			13
32	(Belgium) Wesly Dieudonné	KTM	9	Ret					12
33	(Netherlands) Boyd van der Voorn	Gas Gas			21	21	19	16	9
34	(Netherlands) Dylan Kroon	KTM	DNQ	DNQ	32	28	17	18	9
35	(France) Xavier Cazal	KTM	29	30	22	16			8
36	(Netherlands) Max Schwarte	KTM	19	18	27	19			8
37	(United Kingdom) James Barker	KTM	33	22	DNQ	DNQ	16	Ret	7
38	(Netherlands) Sem de Lange	Gas Gas	39	16					6
39	(Netherlands) Senna van Voorst	KTM	18	Ret	33	29	DSQ	21	6
40	(Netherlands) Sven Dijk	KTM	24	25	Ret	25	Ret	19	5
41	(Netherlands) Jordan-Lee van Maaren	Husqvarna	26	26	24	Ret	21	26	5
42	(Netherlands) Svenn Borger	Yamaha	37	34	30	26	26	Ret	5
43	(United Kingdom) Marcus-Lee Soper	Yamaha			28	32	22	23	4
44	(Estonia) Richard Paat	KTM	36	31	23	24			4
45	(Netherlands) Jan Spliethof	KTM	38	33	DNQ	DNQ	23	25	4
46	(Netherlands) Ruben Koskamp	KTM	DNQ	DNQ	29	31	31	31	4
47	(Finland) Miro Varjonen	Husqvarna	21	19					3
48	(Netherlands) Karl Timmerman	Husqvarna	DNQ	DNQ	Ret	DNS	20	20	2
49	(Netherlands) Eric van Helvoirt	Gas Gas	DNQ	DNQ	DNQ	DNQ	29	22	2
50	(Netherlands) Ward Monkel	Yamaha	DNQ	DNQ	DNQ	DNQ	25	24	2
51	(Republic of Ireland) Jake Sheridan	KTM					24	27	2
52	(Netherlands) Levi Schrik	KTM	DNQ	DNQ	34	27			2
53	(United Kingdom) Ollie Colmer	KTM	31	27					2
54	(Netherlands) Rick Wichertjes	KTM	DNQ	DNQ	DNQ	DNQ	27	28	2
55	(Netherlands) Jesper Gils	Husqvarna	DNQ	DNQ	DNQ	DNQ	33	29	2
56	(Netherlands) Lucas Dolfing	TM	20	29	DNQ	DNQ			2
57	(Netherlands) Twan de Weerd	KTM					32	32	2
58	(Netherlands) Danny van den Bosse	KTM	35	32					2
59	(Netherlands) Wessel van Wijk	Husqvarna	DNQ	DNQ			30	33	2
60	(United Kingdom) Kelton Gwyther	KTM	DNQ	DNQ	DNQ	DNQ	34	35	2
61	(Netherlands) Thijs Schroder	KTM					35	36	2
62	(Netherlands) Jaap Janssen	KTM	25	28	Ret	Ret	Ret	DNS	2
63	(Netherlands) Mats Leeuwesteijn	Husqvarna	DNQ	DNQ			28	DNS	1
64	(Netherlands) Patrick van Pelt	Yamaha					DNQ	30	1
65	(Belgium) Maeron Peeters	Husqvarna	DNQ	DNQ	Ret	30			1
66	(Indonesia) Delvintor Alfarizi	Honda					Ret	34	1
67	(Norway) Elias Auclair	KTM	27	Ret					1
	(Netherlands) Ryan de Beer	KTM					Ret	DNS	0
	(Netherlands) Xander Vossebeld	KTM	DNQ	DNQ	DNQ	Ret			0
	(Netherlands) Wout Jordans	KTM	DNQ	DNQ	DNQ	DNQ	DNQ	DNQ	0
	(Netherlands) Wessel Smienk	KTM			DNQ	DNQ	DNQ	DNQ	0
	(Estonia) Sebastian Leok	Husqvarna	DNQ	DNQ					0
	(United Kingdom) Shaun Mahoney	KTM	DNQ	DNQ					0
	(United Kingdom) Bayliss Utting	Husqvarna	DNQ	DNQ					0
	(Netherlands) Maik Verhoef	KTM	DNQ	DNQ					0
	(Belgium) Nicolas Vennekens	Gas Gas	DNQ	DNQ					0
	(Netherlands) Bart Poland	KTM	DNQ	DNQ					0
	(South Africa) Barend du Toit	Husqvarna	DNQ	DNQ					0
	(Poland) Damian Zdunek	KTM	DNQ	DNQ					0
	(Netherlands) Mats Danenberg	Fantic	DNQ	DNQ					0
	(Netherlands) Remy van Alebeek	Yamaha			DNQ	DNQ			0
	(Netherlands) Didier van Kasteren	KTM			DNQ	DNQ			0
	(Netherlands) Jay Raamsteeboers	KTM			DNQ	DNQ			0
	(Netherlands) Jarno Bleekman	Gas Gas					DNQ	DNQ	0
Pos	Rider	Bike	HAR (Gelderland)		OLD (Gelderland)		MAR (Overijssel)		Points
