= 2026 Dutch Masters of Motocross =

Dutch Motocross Competition in 2026

The 2026 Dutch Masters of Motocross season (known for sponsorship reasons as the CAD2M Dutch Masters of Motocross) was the 9th Dutch Masters of Motocross season.

The series consisted of four rounds across the eastern part of The Netherlands, running from Easter Monday to July. The series increased from three to four rounds for the 2026 season.

Two-time FIM Motocross World Champion Romain Febvre was the reigning champion in the 500cc class. Febvre would ultimately finish runner-up behind Jeffrey Herlings, who took his sixth Dutch Masters title.

Cas Valk went into the season as the defending champion in the 250cc class, after picking up his first title in the previous season. After Valk's season was ended prematurely due to injury, Latvian rider Kārlis Reišulis took his first title in the series, with his brother finishing runner-up in the final standings.

The second race at the second round was cancelled due to poor weather conditions and the condition of the track.

== Race calendar and results ==
=== 500cc ===
| Round | Date | Location | Race 1 Winner | Race 2 Winner | Round Winner |
|---|---|---|---|---|---|
| 1 | 6 April | (Gelderland) Heerde | (Netherlands) Jeffrey Herlings | (Netherlands) Jeffrey Herlings | (Netherlands) Jeffrey Herlings |
| 2 | 3 May | (Gelderland) Harfsen | (Netherlands) Jeffrey Herlings | Race Cancelled | (Netherlands) Jeffrey Herlings |
| 3 | 17 May | (Overijssel) Markelo | (Netherlands) Kay de Wolf | (Netherlands) Kay de Wolf | (Netherlands) Kay de Wolf |
| 4 | 12 July | (Gelderland) Halle | (France) Romain Febvre | (Netherlands) Jeffrey Herlings | (Netherlands) Jeffrey Herlings |

=== 250cc ===
| Round | Date | Location | Race 1 Winner | Race 2 Winner | Round Winner |
|---|---|---|---|---|---|
| 1 | 6 April | (Gelderland) Heerde | (Latvia) Kārlis Reišulis | (Latvia) Jānis Reišulis | (Latvia) Kārlis Reišulis |
| 2 | 3 May | (Gelderland) Harfsen | (Netherlands) Cas Valk | Race Cancelled | (Netherlands) Cas Valk |
| 3 | 17 May | (Overijssel) Markelo | (Belgium) Liam Everts | (Belgium) Liam Everts | (Belgium) Liam Everts |
| 4 | 12 July | (Gelderland) Halle | (Belgium) Liam Everts | (Belgium) Liam Everts | (Belgium) Liam Everts |

=== Circuit locations ===
2026 Dutch Masters of Motocross locations

== 500cc ==
=== Participants ===
| Team | Constructor | No | Rider | Rounds |
|---|---|---|---|---|
| Kawasaki Racing Team MXGP | Kawasaki | 1 | (France) Romain Febvre | All |
| Kawasaki Racing Team MXGP | Kawasaki | 41 | (Latvia) Pauls Jonass | 1–2, 4 |
| Duntep | Husqvarna | 3 | (Netherlands) Sander Hofstede | All |
| Van Venrooy KTM Racing | KTM | 4 | (Netherlands) Rick Elzinga | 4 |
| Van Venrooy KTM Racing | KTM | 91 | (Switzerland) Jeremy Seewer | 4 |
| MRT Racing Team Beta | Beta | 4 | (Netherlands) Rick Elzinga | 2–3 |
| MRT Racing Team Beta | Beta | 93 | (Belgium) Jago Geerts | 2, 4 |
| Buitenhuis Racing | Yamaha | 7 | (Netherlands) Kevin van Dam | 2–3 |
| Buitenhuis Racing | Yamaha | 77 | (Netherlands) Kevin Buitenhuis | 1 |
| Red Bull Ducati Factory MXGP Team | Ducati | 10 | (Netherlands) Calvin Vlaanderen | All |
| Red Bull Ducati Factory MXGP Team | Ducati | 132 | (Italy) Andrea Bonacorsi | 1 |
| Team Sissen | KTM | 15 | (Netherlands) Erik de Bruyn | All |
| MB Service | KTM | 16 | (Netherlands) Roan Bekkers | 2–3 |
| JP Xtreme Xperience | KTM | 29 | (Norway) Sander Agard-Michelsen | All |
| Fantic Factory Racing MXGP | Fantic | 30 | (Italy) Alberto Forato | 1 |
| Fantic Factory Racing MXGP | Fantic | 32 | (Belgium) Brent Van Doninck | 3 |
| Buitenhuis Racing | Yamaha | 33 | (Netherlands) Stan van Zoggel | 4 |
| JHMX Racing | Gas Gas | 34 | (Netherlands) Micha-Boy de Waal | All |
| JHMX Racing | KTM | 136 | (Netherlands) Loeka Thonies | 1–2 |
| Camping Cupido | Yamaha | 38 | (Netherlands) Marcel Conijn | All |
| KTM Kosak Team | KTM | 39 | (Netherlands) Roan van de Moosdijk | 2 |
| Bruggen Tweewielers | Yamaha | 42 | (Netherlands) Ward Monkel | 2, 4 |
| Nestaan Husqvarna Factory Racing | Husqvarna | 74 | (Netherlands) Kay de Wolf | 1, 3 |
| Red Bull KTM Factory Racing | KTM | 80 | (Italy) Andrea Adamo | 3 |
| Nilssons Motor | Kawasaki | 81 | (Sweden) Axel Isgren | 1 |
| Honda HRC PETRONAS | Honda | 84 | (Netherlands) Jeffrey Herlings | All |
| Honda HRC PETRONAS | Honda | 116 | (France) Tom Vialle | 1 |
| RVH Racing | KTM | 88 | (Belgium) Ryan Van Hove | 3–4 |
| | Honda | 89 | (Netherlands) Remi Krap | 1–3 |
| Laurense Motors Kawasaki Racing | Kawasaki | 94 | (Netherlands) Sven van der Mierden | All |
| Laurense Motors Kawasaki Racing | Kawasaki | 841 | (Netherlands) Robert Fobbe | 1–2, 4 |
| Team 101 Racing | Yamaha | 101 | (Estonia) Erki Kahro | 1 |
| FRT Racing | Yamaha | 104 | (Germany) Dominik Grau | 1–2 |
| VD Laar Racing | Yamaha | 111 | (Netherlands) Damien Knuiman | All |
| | KTM | 115 | (Belgium) Enzo Aerden | 3 |
| Van der Velden Motoren | KTM | 118 | (Netherlands) Joël van Mechelen | All |
| RacingCenter Antwerpen | KTM | 135 | (Belgium) Brent Aerden | 3 |
| Schmicker Silve Racing | KTM | 142 | (Finland) Jere Haavisto | 2 |
| | KTM | 182 | (Republic of Ireland) Jake Sheridan | 1–2 |
| | Husqvarna | 198 | (Sweden) Jesper Hansson | 1 |
| | KTM | 201 | (Netherlands) Robin van Oldeniel | All |
| Sigmans Yamaha | Yamaha | 217 | (Netherlands) Teun Cooymans | All |
| Hoenson Racing | KTM | 241 | (Netherlands) Michel Hoenson | 1 |
| | KTM | 242 | (Netherlands) Boris Slot | 3 |
| Turing Insights Racing | Husqvarna | 247 | (South Africa) Jean Visser | 4 |
| Team GCR | Yamaha | 259 | (Netherlands) Glenn Coldenhoff | 1, 3–4 |
| Nobis MX Team | KTM | 303 | (Netherlands) Krijn van Vroenhoven | 1 |
| | KTM | 422 | (Netherlands) Tyler Eltink | 2–4 |
| Kemco Management/WPM Motors | KTM | 484 | (Netherlands) Dave Kooiker | All |
| Brouwer Motors | KTM | 491 | (Netherlands) Wessel van Wijk | All |
| Care Innovation Racing Team | KTM | 521 | (Netherlands) Boris Blanken | All |
| Pol Motors | Gas Gas | 812 | (Netherlands) Sem de Lange | 3 |
| WTX Racing | KTM | 815 | (Netherlands) Ryan Witlox | 1, 4 |
| WPM Team | KTM | 821 | (Netherlands) Robin Scholten | 1 |
| | Yamaha | 822 | (Netherlands) Mike Bolink | All |
| Star Twin Ducati MX Team | Ducati | 826 | (Netherlands) Nick Leerkes | 1–3 |
| VisuAlz Production | Kawasaki | 891 | (Germany) Paul Ullrich | 2, 4 |
| Monster Energy Yamaha Factory MXGP Team | Yamaha | 959 | (France) Maxime Renaux | 2 |

=== Riders Championship ===
Points are awarded to finishers of the main races, in the following format:

| Position | 1st | 2nd | 3rd | 4th | 5th | 6th | 7th | 8th | 9th | 10th | 11th | 12th | 13th | 14th | 15th | 16th | 17th | 18th | 19th | 20th+ |
| Points | 25 | 22 | 20 | 18 | 16 | 15 | 14 | 13 | 12 | 11 | 10 | 9 | 8 | 7 | 6 | 5 | 4 | 3 | 2 | 1 |

| Pos | Rider | Bike | HEE (Gelderland) | | HAR (Gelderland) | | MAR (Overijssel) | | HAL (Gelderland) | | Points |
|---|---|---|---|---|---|---|---|---|---|---|---|
| 1 | (Netherlands) Jeffrey Herlings | Honda | 1 | 1 | 1 | C | 2 | 2 | 2 | 1 | 166 |
| 2 | (France) Romain Febvre | Kawasaki | 3 | 2 | 2 | C | 4 | 3 | 1 | 2 | 149 |
| 3 | (Netherlands) Calvin Vlaanderen | Ducati | 6 | 5 | 5 | C | 5 | 4 | 4 | 4 | 117 |
| 4 | (Netherlands) Glenn Coldenhoff | Yamaha | 4 | 7 | | | 3 | 6 | 8 | 7 | 94 |
| 5 | (Netherlands) Kay de Wolf | Husqvarna | 2 | 4 | | | 1 | 1 | | | 90 |
| 6 | (Latvia) Pauls Jonass | Kawasaki | 7 | 8 | 4 | C | | | 3 | 3 | 85 |
| 7 | (Netherlands) Damien Knuiman | Yamaha | 10 | 12 | 7 | C | 8 | 7 | 9 | 9 | 85 |
| 8 | (Netherlands) Sven van der Mierden | Kawasaki | 13 | 10 | 12 | C | 10 | 9 | 10 | 11 | 72 |
| 9 | (Netherlands) Micha-Boy de Waal | Gas Gas | Ret | 16 | 10 | C | 11 | 8 | 11 | 10 | 60 |
| 10 | (Norway) Sander Agard-Michelsen | KTM | 14 | 15 | 16 | C | 18 | 11 | 12 | 13 | 48 |
| 11 | (Netherlands) Joël van Mechelen | KTM | 23 | 13 | 15 | C | 14 | 10 | 15 | 12 | 48 |
| 12 | (Netherlands) Mike Bolink | Yamaha | 16 | 14 | 17 | C | 13 | 14 | 14 | 15 | 44 |
| 13 | (Netherlands) Nick Leerkes | Ducati | 15 | 11 | 11 | C | 12 | 13 | | | 43 |
| 14 | (Netherlands) Boris Blanken | KTM | 12 | 9 | Ret | C | 9 | 12 | Ret | DNS | 42 |
| 15 | (Netherlands) Rick Elzinga | Beta | | | 9 | C | Ret | DNS | | | 39 |
| 15 | (Netherlands) Rick Elzinga | KTM | | | | | | | 7 | 8 | 39 |
| 16 | (Netherlands) Marcel Conijn | Yamaha | 18 | 17 | 18 | C | 15 | 15 | 16 | 14 | 34 |
| 17 | (Netherlands) Dave Kooiker | KTM | 11 | 18 | 13 | C | 16 | Ret | 13 | Ret | 34 |
| 18 | (Italy) Alberto Forato | Fantic | 8 | 3 | | | | | | | 33 |
| 19 | (Switzerland) Jeremy Seewer | KTM | | | | | | | 5 | 6 | 31 |
| 20 | (Belgium) Jago Geerts | Beta | | | Ret | C | | | 6 | 5 | 31 |
| 21 | (Italy) Andrea Bonacorsi | Ducati | 5 | 6 | | | | | | | 31 |
| 22 | (Belgium) Brent Van Doninck | Fantic | | | | | 7 | 5 | | | 30 |
| 23 | (France) Maxime Renaux | Yamaha | | | 3 | C | | | | | 20 |
| 24 | (Netherlands) Roan van de Moosdijk | KTM | | | 6 | C | | | | | 15 |
| 25 | (Italy) Andrea Adamo | KTM | | | | | 6 | Ret | | | 15 |
| 26 | (Finland) Jere Haavisto | KTM | | | 8 | C | | | | | 13 |
| 27 | (Netherlands) Robin van Oldeniel | KTM | 21 | Ret | 21 | C | 17 | 18 | Ret | 17 | 13 |
| 28 | (France) Tom Vialle | Honda | 9 | Ret | | | | | | | 12 |
| 29 | (Netherlands) Sander Hofstede | Husqvarna | 19 | 20 | 24 | C | 20 | 17 | 21 | 22 | 11 |
| 30 | (Netherlands) Robert Fobbe | Kawasaki | 17 | Ret | 14 | C | | | Ret | DNS | 11 |
| 31 | (Netherlands) Tyler Eltink | KTM | | | 19 | C | 19 | DNS | Ret | 16 | 9 |
| 32 | (Netherlands) Wessel van Wijk | KTM | 31 | Ret | Ret | C | 21 | 19 | 17 | 21 | 9 |
| 33 | (Netherlands) Teun Cooymans | Yamaha | 22 | 19 | 23 | C | 24 | 23 | 26 | Ret | 7 |
| 34 | (Netherlands) Erik de Bruyn | KTM | 25 | 26 | Ret | C | Ret | 22 | 20 | 19 | 6 |
| 35 | (Belgium) Ryan Van Hove | KTM | | | | | 23 | 20 | 23 | 18 | 6 |
| 36 | (Netherlands) Remi Krap | Honda | 32 | 29 | 29 | C | 27 | 27 | | | 5 |
| 37 | (Belgium) Brent Aerden | KTM | | | | | Ret | 16 | | | 5 |
| 38 | (Netherlands) Ryan Witlox | KTM | 30 | 25 | | | | | 19 | 20 | 5 |
| 39 | (Netherlands) Kevin van Dam | Yamaha | | | 25 | C | 22 | 21 | | | 3 |
| 40 | (Netherlands) Stan van Zoggel | Yamaha | | | | | | | 18 | Ret | 3 |
| 41 | (Netherlands) Ward Monkel | Yamaha | | | 26 | C | | | 25 | 24 | 3 |
| 42 | (Netherlands) Loeka Thonies | KTM | 26 | 24 | 20 | C | | | | | 3 |
| 43 | (Republic of Ireland) Jake Sheridan | KTM | 33 | 30 | 27 | C | | | | | 3 |
| 44 | (Germany) Paul Ullrich | Kawasaki | | | 22 | C | | | 22 | 23 | 3 |
| 45 | (Netherlands) Kevin Buitenhuis | KTM | 29 | 28 | | | | | | | 2 |
| 46 | (Estonia) Erki Kahro | Yamaha | 20 | 22 | | | | | | | 2 |
| 47 | (Germany) Dominik Grau | Yamaha | Ret | 31 | 28 | C | | | | | 2 |
| 48 | (Belgium) Enzo Aerden | KTM | | | | | 25 | 24 | | | 2 |
| 49 | (Sweden) Jesper Hansson | Husqvarna | 28 | 23 | | | | | | | 2 |
| 50 | (Netherlands) Michel Hoenson | KTM | 27 | 27 | | | | | | | 2 |
| 51 | (Netherlands) Boris Slot | KTM | | | | | 26 | 26 | | | 2 |
| 52 | (Netherlands) Krijn van Vroenhoven | KTM | 24 | 21 | | | | | | | 2 |
| 53 | (Netherlands) Roan Bekkers | KTM | | | Ret | C | Ret | 25 | | | 1 |
| 54 | (Sweden) Axel Isgren | Kawasaki | 35 | Ret | | | | | | | 1 |
| 55 | (South Africa) Jean Visser | Husqvarna | | | | | | | 24 | Ret | 1 |
| 56 | (Netherlands) Robin Scholten | KTM | 34 | Ret | | | | | | | 1 |
| | (Netherlands) Sem de Lange | Gas Gas | | | | | Ret | DNS | | | 0 |
| Pos | Rider | Bike | HEE (Gelderland) | | HAR (Gelderland) | | MAR (Overijssel) | | HAL (Gelderland) | | Points |

== 250cc ==
=== Participants ===
| Team | Constructor | No | Rider | Rounds |
|---|---|---|---|---|
| | Yamaha | 4 | (Netherlands) Lars Looman | 4 |
| Monster Energy Yamaha Factory MX2 | Yamaha | 7 | (Latvia) Kārlis Reišulis | All |
| Monster Energy Yamaha Factory MX2 | Yamaha | 772 | (Latvia) Jānis Reišulis | All |
| Husqvarna Scandinavia | Husqvarna | 12 | (Norway) Pelle Gundersen | 1 |
| JP Xtreme Xperience | KTM | 14 | (Netherlands) Damian Bergevoet | All |
| JP Xtreme Xperience | KTM | 644 | (Netherlands) Thijs Schroder | 2–4 |
| Gebben Racing | Yamaha | 15 | (Netherlands) Svenn Borger | 1 |
| Orel MX Team | KTM | 17 | (Indonesia) Angga Lubis | 2 |
| Orel MX Team | KTM | 121 | (Indonesia) Akbar Lubis | 2–3 |
| Duntep | Husqvarna | 18 | (Netherlands) Daan Hofstede | All |
| | Fantic | 21 | (Netherlands) Greg van der Weide | All |
| Vd Laar Racing | KTM | 24 | (Netherlands) Jordy van Orsouw | 1–2, 4 |
| Nestaan Husqvarna Factory Racing | Husqvarna | 26 | (Belgium) Liam Everts | 3–4 |
| Motovation Motorsport Husqvarna | Husqvarna | 28 | (Netherlands) Dean Gregoire | 2–4 |
| Motovation Motorsport Husqvarna | Husqvarna | 499 | (Netherlands) Dani Heitink | All |
| | KTM | 30 | (Netherlands) René de Jong | 2–4 |
| Dixon Racing Team Kawasaki | Kawasaki | 33 | (Netherlands) Kay Karssemakers | All |
| | KTM | 36 | (Netherlands) Joep Poland | 3 |
| Van Venrooy KTM Racing | KTM | 39 | (Hungary) Áron Katona | 1–3 |
| Van Venrooy KTM Racing | KTM | 716 | (Hungary) Noel Zanócz | 1–3 |
| Schmicker Silve Racing | KTM | 41 | (Finland) Saku Mansikkamäki | 2 |
| Schmicker Silve Racing | KTM | 358 | (Finland) Nico Stenberg | 2 |
| TDW Motoparts | KTM | 42 | (Netherlands) Twan de Weerd | 2–3 |
| KTM SB Racing | KTM | 48 | (Netherlands) Jens Walvoort | 1, 4 |
| Viaber Racing | KTM | 71 | (Finland) Arttu Sahlstén | 1 |
| | KTM | 78 | (Belgium) Thomas Van den Heule | 3 |
| Polned KTM | KTM | 80 | (Netherlands) Rizan Hartman | 3 |
| De Baets AIT Racing | Yamaha | 81 | (Bulgaria) Vencislav Toshev | 1–3 |
| De Baets AIT Racing | Yamaha | 401 | (Netherlands) Lotte van Drunen | 1 |
| De Baets AIT Racing | Yamaha | 555 | (Republic of Ireland) Cole McCullough | 1 |
| FLK Diensten | KTM | 85 | (Netherlands) Ferdi Keeler | 4 |
| Laurense Motors Kawasaki Racing | Kawasaki | 88 | (Netherlands) Eric van Helvoirt | 1, 4 |
| | KTM | 98 | (Netherlands) Dylan Kroon | 1 |
| Ten Kate Motoren | Yamaha | 101 | (Netherlands) Mirco ten Kate | All |
| | TM | 110 | (Netherlands) Abel Haagen | 3 |
| Seven Motorsport TM Factory | TM | 118 | (Belgium) Douwe Van Mechgelen | 1–2 |
| Seven Motorsport | KTM | 118 | (Belgium) Douwe Van Mechgelen | 4 |
| Andre Motors | KTM | 120 | (Netherlands) Alex van Weerdenburg | 2–4 |
| Postévi Capital | KTM | 122 | (Netherlands) Wout Jordans | 2 |
| VD Laar Racing | Yamaha | 129 | (Netherlands) Jesse Schel | 1, 3 |
| | Husqvarna | 139 | (Germany) Nonni Lange | All |
| Care Innovation Racing Team | KTM | 145 | (Netherlands) Jeroen Bussink | All |
| Powerhouse Superstore | Yamaha | 164 | (Netherlands) Remy van Alebeek | 2–3 |
| | KTM | 168 | (Netherlands) Sjef Platte | 1 |
| TM Moto CRD Motorsport Factory Racing Team | TM | 172 | (Netherlands) Cas Valk | 1 |
| Chambers KTM Racing | KTM | 172 | (Netherlands) Cas Valk | 2–3 |
| JPV Racing | KTM | 194 | (Finland) Vilho Vehviläinen | 1 |
| | Suzuki | 245 | (Netherlands) Jorg Schokker | 1, 4 |
| Tom Leenders Dakwerken | KTM | 295 | (Netherlands) Kick van Mil | 1, 3 |
| Andreas Auto's | Honda | 329 | (Netherlands) Luca Nijenhuis | 3 |
| Cat Moto Prospects | Husqvarna | 400 | (Netherlands) Roan Tolsma | All |
| Kop og Kande KBI | KTM | 402 | (Denmark) Casey Karstrøm | 4 |
| DVS Junior Racing TM | TM | 417 | (Netherlands) Jayson van Drunen | 1 |
| Schepers Racing | Honda | 424 | (Netherlands) Wesley Schepers | 3 |
| Hannamax Motorsport | Honda | 427 | (Netherlands) Mick Kennedy | 2, 4 |
| | KTM | 428 | (Netherlands) Jelle Bankers | All |
| | Gas Gas | 438 | (Belgium) Brent Van de Walle | 3 |
| Lema Chemie/Denicol | Gas Gas | 470 | (Belgium) Wout van Beysterveldt | 3 |
| F4E Gas Gas Racing Team | Gas Gas | 474 | (Belgium) Ian Ampoorter | 2, 4 |
| | Husqvarna | 477 | (Netherlands) Guus Oomen | 1–4 |
| EastMX | Gas Gas | 480 | (Finland) Kasimir Hindersson | 1 |
| Brouwer Motors | KTM | 485 | (Netherlands) Senna van Voorst | All |
| YDH Motorsport | Kawasaki | 492 | (Netherlands) Yourick den Hollander | 2–3 |
| | KTM | 497 | (Netherlands) Sem Taspinar | 1–2 |
| VHR Yamaha Official EMX250 Team | Yamaha | 503 | (Belgium) Jarne Bervoets | All |
| Dörr Motorsport Triumph Racing | Triumph | 511 | (Germany) Jan Krug | 2 |
| Becker Racing | Gas Gas | 529 | (Belgium) Maxime Lucas | 4 |
| MX Team Decouter | Yamaha | 536 | (Belgium) Arthur Decouter | 2–4 |
| | KTM | 538 | (Netherlands) Bryan Nelis | 1 |
| Team Ties Pol Motors Gas Gas | Gas Gas | 551 | (Netherlands) Mike Visser | 1, 3–4 |
| MX Team Achterhoek | Fantic | 621 | (Netherlands) Klaas Jan Kruisselbrink | All |
| | Husqvarna | 634 | (Belgium) Maeron Peeters | 1–3 |
| Van der Wardt Bouw | KTM | 715 | (Netherlands) Jaap Janssen | All |
| SixtySeven Racing Team | Husqvarna | 724 | (Netherlands) Jaymian Ramakers | 4 |
| FRT Racing | Triumph | 794 | (Germany) Jonathan Frank | 2 |
| MX88 Motorsport | Husqvarna | 801 | (Netherlands) Freek van der Vlist | All |
| MX-Academy Honda Racing by Meuwissen Motorsports | Honda | 811 | (Belgium) Emile De Baere | 2, 4 |
| WPM Motors | KTM | 814 | (Netherlands) Maik Verhoef | All |
| Schepers Racing | KTM | 880 | (Netherlands) Sven Dijk | All |
| CTM Motorhomes | Yamaha | 946 | (Belgium) Thybe Ceulemans | All |
| Yamaha Scandinavia | Yamaha | 981 | (Sweden) Gustav Axelsson | 1 |

=== Riders Championship ===
Points are awarded to finishers of the main races, in the following format:

| Position | 1st | 2nd | 3rd | 4th | 5th | 6th | 7th | 8th | 9th | 10th | 11th | 12th | 13th | 14th | 15th | 16th | 17th | 18th | 19th | 20th+ |
| Points | 25 | 22 | 20 | 18 | 16 | 15 | 14 | 13 | 12 | 11 | 10 | 9 | 8 | 7 | 6 | 5 | 4 | 3 | 2 | 1 |

| Pos | Rider | Bike | HEE (Gelderland) | | HAR (Gelderland) | | MAR (Overijssel) | | HAL (Gelderland) | | Points |
|---|---|---|---|---|---|---|---|---|---|---|---|
| 1 | (Latvia) Kārlis Reišulis | Yamaha | 1 | 3 | 3 | C | 2 | 4 | 2 | 2 | 149 |
| 2 | (Latvia) Jānis Reišulis | Yamaha | 7 | 1 | 2 | C | 3 | 2 | 3 | 3 | 143 |
| 3 | (Netherlands) Kay Karssemakers | Kawasaki | 3 | 2 | 5 | C | 4 | 3 | Ret | 4 | 114 |
| 4 | (Belgium) Liam Everts | Husqvarna | | | | | 1 | 1 | 1 | 1 | 100 |
| 5 | (Netherlands) Roan Tolsma | Husqvarna | 8 | 7 | 6 | C | 9 | 6 | 11 | 12 | 88 |
| 6 | (Netherlands) Dani Heitink | Husqvarna | 6 | Ret | 7 | C | 7 | 5 | 6 | 11 | 84 |
| 7 | (Netherlands) Cas Valk | TM | 2 | 4 | | | | | | | 65 |
| 7 | (Netherlands) Cas Valk | KTM | | | 1 | C | DNS | DNS | | | 65 |
| 8 | (Netherlands) Jeroen Bussink | KTM | 11 | 19 | 23 | C | 10 | 8 | 8 | 7 | 64 |
| 9 | (Netherlands) Mirco ten Kate | Yamaha | 9 | 20 | 16 | C | 8 | 14 | 9 | 9 | 62 |
| 10 | (Belgium) Jarne Bervoets | Yamaha | Ret | 9 | 4 | C | Ret | DNS | 5 | 8 | 59 |
| 11 | (Hungary) Áron Katona | KTM | 17 | 6 | 12 | C | 6 | 7 | | | 57 |
| 12 | (Netherlands) Dean Gregoire | Husqvarna | | | 9 | C | 13 | DNS | 4 | 5 | 54 |
| 13 | (Netherlands) Freek van der Vlist | Husqvarna | 22 | 17 | 18 | C | 12 | 9 | 12 | 13 | 46 |
| 14 | (Hungary) Noel Zanócz | KTM | Ret | 8 | 8 | C | 5 | Ret | | | 42 |
| 15 | (Netherlands) Senna van Voorst | KTM | 26 | 24 | Ret | C | 11 | 11 | 13 | 14 | 37 |
| 16 | (Belgium) Ian Ampoorter | Gas Gas | | | 10 | C | | | 7 | 10 | 36 |
| 17 | (Belgium) Douwe Van Mechgelen | TM | 12 | 11 | Ret | C | | | | | 35 |
| 17 | (Belgium) Douwe Van Mechgelen | KTM | | | | | | | 33 | 6 | 35 |
| 18 | (Netherlands) Jens Walvoort | KTM | 5 | 5 | | | | | | | 32 |
| 19 | (Netherlands) Guus Oomen | Husqvarna | 16 | 13 | 13 | C | 20 | 13 | | | 30 |
| 20 | (Norway) Pelle Gundersen | Husqvarna | 4 | 10 | | | | | | | 29 |
| 21 | (Netherlands) Greg van der Weide | Fantic | 27 | 30 | 22 | C | 15 | 15 | 15 | 16 | 26 |
| 22 | (Bulgaria) Vencislav Toshev | Yamaha | 18 | 15 | 17 | C | Ret | 10 | | | 24 |
| 23 | (Netherlands) Jaap Janssen | KTM | 28 | 27 | 21 | C | 16 | 16 | 17 | 17 | 21 |
| 24 | (Finland) Kasimir Hindersson | Gas Gas | 10 | 12 | | | | | | | 20 |
| 25 | (Netherlands) René de Jong | KTM | | | 19 | C | 17 | 12 | 20 | 18 | 19 |
| 26 | (Belgium) Emile De Baere | Honda | | | 14 | C | | | 10 | Ret | 18 |
| 27 | (Finland) Vilho Vehviläinen | KTM | 14 | 14 | | | | | | | 14 |
| 28 | (Netherlands) Mike Visser | Gas Gas | Ret | 33 | | | 21 | 17 | 14 | Ret | 13 |
| 29 | (Netherlands) Damian Bergevoet | KTM | 29 | 26 | Ret | C | 18 | 20 | 19 | 19 | 10 |
| 30 | (Germany) Jan Krug | Triumph | | | 11 | C | | | | | 10 |
| 31 | (Finland) Arttu Sahlstén | KTM | 13 | 21 | | | | | | | 9 |
| 32 | (Netherlands) Jaymian Ramakers | Husqvarna | | | | | | | 18 | 15 | 9 |
| 33 | (Netherlands) Sven Dijk | KTM | 25 | 25 | 24 | C | 23 | 19 | 21 | 25 | 8 |
| 34 | (Netherlands) Luca Nijenhuis | Honda | | | | | 14 | Ret | | | 7 |
| 35 | (Netherlands) Lotte van Drunen | Yamaha | 15 | 22 | | | | | | | 7 |
| 36 | (Netherlands) Klaas Jan Kruisselbrink | Fantic | 32 | 31 | 26 | C | 24 | 25 | 26 | 20 | 7 |
| 37 | (Finland) Saku Mansikkamäki | KTM | | | 15 | C | | | | | 6 |
| 38 | (Germany) Nonni Lange | Husqvarna | 34 | 36 | DNQ | C | 27 | 26 | 29 | 27 | 6 |
| 39 | (Belgium) Maxime Lucas | Gas Gas | | | | | | | 16 | 30 | 6 |
| 40 | (Republic of Ireland) Cole McCullough | Yamaha | 20 | 16 | | | | | | | 6 |
| 41 | (Netherlands) Wesley Schepers | Honda | | | | | 19 | 18 | | | 5 |
| 42 | (Netherlands) Maik Verhoef | KTM | DNQ | DNQ | 29 | C | 31 | 23 | 28 | 21 | 5 |
| 43 | (Belgium) Maeron Peeters | Husqvarna | 35 | 35 | Ret | C | 25 | 21 | | | 4 |
| 44 | (Netherlands) Thijs Schroder | KTM | | | DNQ | C | 30 | 27 | 24 | 22 | 4 |
| 45 | (Sweden) Gustav Axelsson | Yamaha | 23 | 18 | | | | | | | 4 |
| 46 | (Netherlands) Jordy van Orsouw | KTM | 33 | 32 | 31 | C | | | Ret | DNS | 3 |
| 47 | (Netherlands) Alex van Weerdenburg | Honda | | | 32 | C | Ret | 28 | 30 | Ret | 3 |
| 48 | (Netherlands) Jorg Schokker | Suzuki | 31 | 29 | | | | | 27 | Ret | 3 |
| 49 | (Belgium) Arthur Decouter | Yamaha | | | 28 | C | Ret | DNS | 25 | 23 | 3 |
| 50 | (Netherlands) Lars Looman | Yamaha | | | | | | | 22 | 24 | 2 |
| 51 | (Netherlands) Svenn Borger | Yamaha | 30 | 28 | | | | | | | 2 |
| 52 | (Netherlands) Daan Hofstede | Husqvarna | DNQ | DNQ | DNQ | C | DNQ | DNQ | 31 | 26 | 2 |
| 53 | (Netherlands) Joep Poland | KTM | | | | | 32 | 29 | | | 2 |
| 54 | (Netherlands) Eric van Helvoirt | Kawasaki | 19 | Ret | | | | | Ret | DNS | 2 |
| 55 | (Indonesia) Akbar Lubis | KTM | | | 30 | C | 29 | Ret | | | 2 |
| 56 | (Netherlands) Remy van Alebeek | Yamaha | | | 27 | C | 22 | Ret | | | 2 |
| 57 | (Denmark) Casey Karstrøm | KTM | | | | | | | 23 | 28 | 2 |
| 58 | (Belgium) Brent Van de Walle | Gas Gas | | | | | 26 | 24 | | | 2 |
| 59 | (Netherlands) Sem Taspinar | KTM | 21 | 23 | Ret | C | | | | | 2 |
| 60 | (Netherlands) Bryan Nelis | KTM | 24 | 34 | | | | | | | 2 |
| 61 | (Belgium) Thybe Ceulemans | Yamaha | DNQ | DNQ | DNQ | C | DNQ | DNQ | 32 | 29 | 2 |
| 62 | (Netherlands) Jesse Schel | Yamaha | DNQ | DNQ | | | 28 | DNS | | | 1 |
| 63 | (Netherlands) Mick Kennedy | Honda | | | 20 | C | | | Ret | DNS | 1 |
| 64 | (Netherlands) Jelle Bankers | KTM | Ret | Ret | Ret | C | Ret | 22 | Ret | Ret | 1 |
| 65 | (Netherlands) Yourick den Hollander | KTM | | | 25 | C | Ret | DNS | | | 1 |
| | (Netherlands) Jayson van Drunen | TM | Ret | Ret | | | | | | | 0 |
| | (Netherlands) Abel Haagen | TM | | | | | Ret | DNS | | | 0 |
| | (Belgium) Wout Van Beysterveldt | Gas Gas | | | | | Ret | DNS | | | 0 |
| | (Netherlands) Ferdi Keeler | KTM | | | | | | | Ret | DNS | 0 |
| | (Finland) Nico Stenberg | KTM | | | Ret | C | | | | | 0 |
| | (Germany) Jonathan Frank | Triumph | | | Ret | C | | | | | 0 |
| | (Netherlands) Kick van Mil | KTM | DNQ | DNQ | | | DNQ | DNQ | | | 0 |
| | (Netherlands) Twan de Weerd | KTM | | | DNQ | C | DNQ | DNQ | | | 0 |
| | (Netherlands) Dylan Kroon | KTM | DNQ | DNQ | | | | | | | 0 |
| | (Netherlands) Sjef Platte | KTM | DNQ | DNQ | | | | | | | 0 |
| | (Netherlands) Wout Jordans | KTM | | | DNQ | C | | | | | 0 |
| | (Indonesia) Angga Lubis | KTM | | | DNQ | C | | | | | 0 |
| | (Belgium) Thomas Van den Heule | KTM | | | | | DNQ | DNQ | | | 0 |
| | (Netherlands) Rizan Hartman | KTM | | | | | DNQ | DNQ | | | 0 |
| Pos | Rider | Bike | HEE (Gelderland) | | HAR (Gelderland) | | MAR (Overijssel) | | HAL (Gelderland) | | Points |
