= Monster Energy Yamaha Factory =

Motorcycle team

- Base: Gerno di Lesmo, Italy
- Rider(s): MotoGP: Fabio Quartararo; Álex Rins; Maverick Viñales (to mid-2021); Motocross MXGP: Jago Geerts; Maxime Renaux; Calvin Vlaanderen; Motocross MX2: Rick Elzinga; Thibault Benistant; Kārlis Reišulis
- Motorcycle: Yamaha
- Tyres: various

Monster Energy Yamaha Factory is the factory team of Yamaha active in the MotoGP World Championship, the Motocross World Championship, the FIM Endurance World Championship, the Superbike World Championship and FIM Cross-Country Rallies World Championship, supported by sponsor, drinks manufacturer Monster Energy.

== MotoGP ==
In the MotoGP World Championship the Monster Energy Yamaha Factory team takes the official name of Monster Energy Yamaha MotoGP Team. The Monster Energy brand is sponsor of the official team starting from the 2019 season.

=== Riders ===
2023

- (France) Fabio Quartararo
- (Italy) Franco Morbidelli

2022

- (France) Fabio Quartararo
- (Italy) Franco Morbidelli

2021

- (France) Fabio Quartararo
- (Italy) Franco Morbidelli
- (Spain) Maverick Viñales

2020

- (Spain) Maverick Vinales
- (United States) Garrett Gerloff
- (Italy) Valentino Rossi

2019

- (Spain) Maverick Vinales
- (Italy) Valentino Rossi

=== Results ===
(key)

Year	Motorcycle	Tyres	No.	Riders	1	2	3	4	5	6	7	8	9	10	11	12	13	14	15	16	17	18	19	Points	RC
2019	Yamaha YZR-M1	M			QAT	ARG	AME	SPA	FRA	ITA	CAT	NED	GER	CZE	AUT	GBR	RSM	ARA	THA	JPN	AUS	MAL	VAL		
2019	Yamaha YZR-M1	M	12	(Spain) Maverick Vinales	7	Ret	11	3	Ret	6	Ret	1	2	10	5	3	3	4	3	4	Ret	1	6	211	3rd
2019	Yamaha YZR-M1	M	46	(Italy) Valentino Rossi	5	2	2	6	5	Ret	Ret	Ret	8	6	4	4	4	8	8	Ret	8	4	8	174	7th
2020	Yamaha YZR-M1	M			SPA	ANC	CZE	AUT	STY	RSM	EMI	CAT	FRA	ARA	TER	EUR	VAL	POR							
2020	Yamaha YZR-M1	M	12	(Spain) Maverick Vinales	2	2	14	10	Ret	6	1	9	10	4	7	13	10	11						132	6th
2020	Yamaha YZR-M1	M	31	(United States) Garrett Gerloff												WD (Note: Garrett Gerloff initially replaced Valentino Rossi during round 12 and competed in the two Friday practice sessions while Rossi was waiting for his COVID-19 test results, but was withdrawn from the race when Rossi was declared fit to race after testing negative for COVID-19.)								0	NC
2020	Yamaha YZR-M1	M	46	(Italy) Valentino Rossi	Ret	3	5	5	9	4	Ret	Ret	Ret			Ret	12	12						66	15th
2021	Yamaha YZR-M1	M			QAT	DOH	POR	SPA	FRA	ITA	CAT	GER	NED	STY	AUT	GBR	ARA	RSM	AME	EMI	ALR	VAL			
2021	Yamaha YZR-M1	M	12	(Spain) Maverick Viñales	1	5	11	7	10	8	5	19	2											95 (106)	10th
2021	Yamaha YZR-M1	M	20	(France) Fabio Quartararo	5	1	1	13	3	1	6	3	1	3	7	1	8	2	2	4	Ret	5		278	1st

=== Rally raid ===
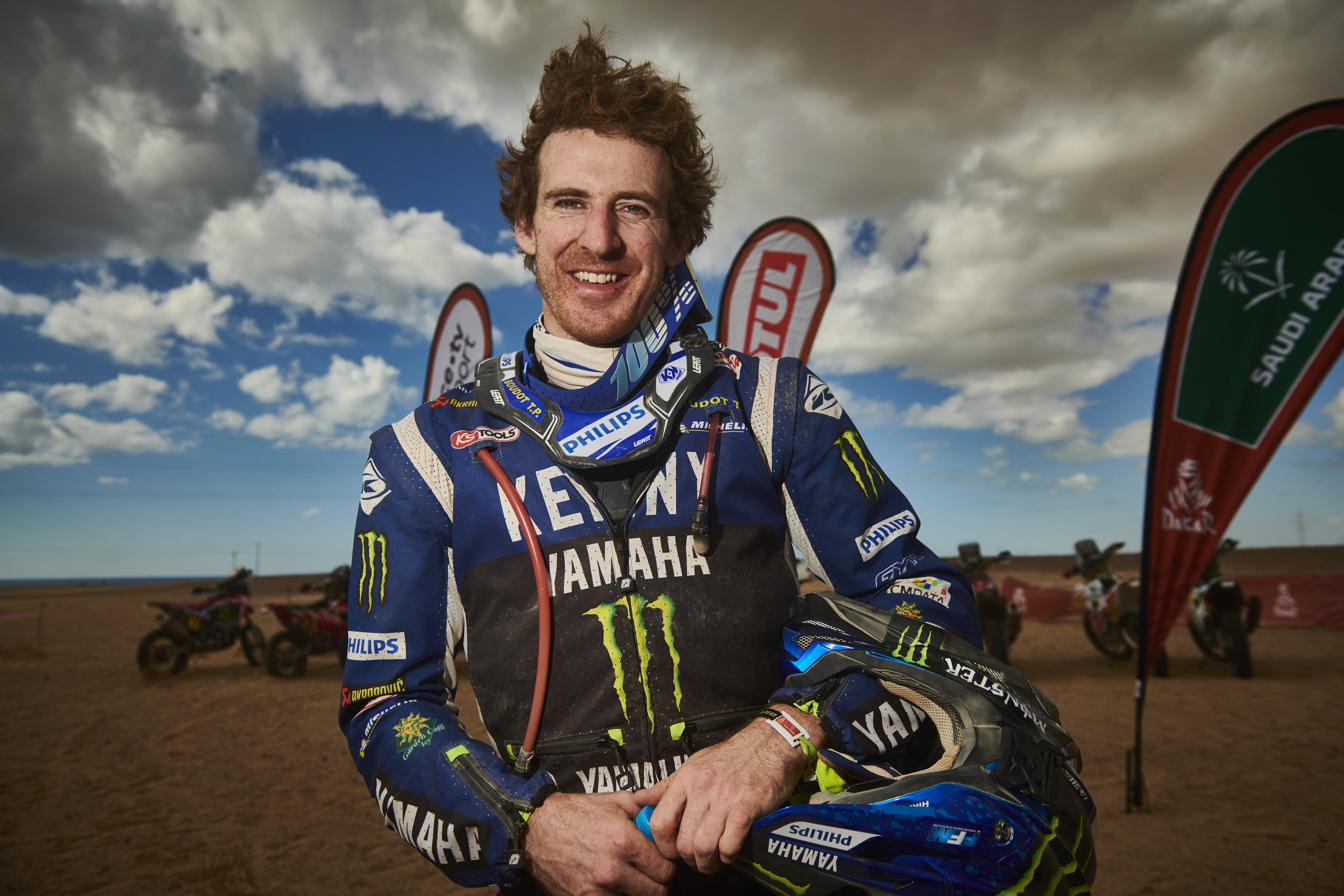
Xavier de Soultrait past official team driver in rally raids.

The so-called "Dakar team" is made up of the following three official drivers.

- Adrien Van Beveren
- Andrew Short
- Ross Branch

== See also ==
- Yamaha Motor Racing
- Monster Energy
