= Jānis Reišulis =

Latvian motocross racer

- Nationality: Latvian
- Born: 25 March 2008 (age 18) Gulbene, Latvia

Motocross career
- Years active: 2020–present
- Teams: KTM Motofavorīts MX Team (2021–2022); Team Yamaha Europe MJC (2023); Team VRT Yamaha Racing (2024); VHR VRT Yamaha Official EMX250 Team (2025); Monster Energy Yamaha Factory MX2 (2026–present)
- Championships: •2023 EMX 125cc; •2025 EMX 250cc

Jānis Mārtiņš Reišulis (born 25 March 2008) is a Latvian professional Motocross racer. Reišulis has competed full-time in the Motocross World Championship since the 2026 season. Reišulis is a two-time European Motocross Champion.

Reišulis has represented his country at the Motocross des Nations on three occasions, the most recent being the 2026 event, where Latvia finished in their highest final overall position to date.

Alongside picking up his European titles in the EMX125 and EMX250 classes, Reišulis has also won national championships at 125cc level in Germany, The Netherlands and his native Latvia.

Reišulis is the younger brother of Kārlis Reišulis, who is also a world-championship level motocross racer. The pair have spent several years as teammates whilst racing in the MXGP paddock.

== Career ==
=== Junior career ===
After starting in the sport at a young age, Reišulis progressed through the junior ranks in Latvia and around Europe. He competed in the EMX65 class of the 2018 European Motocross Championship, where he finished seventh overall.

In 2021, Reišulis became Latvian champion in the MX85 class and finished as runner-up in the EMX85 class of the 2021 European Motocross Championship, qualifying on pole at the event and winning second race. He also represented Latvia at the 2021 FIM Motocross Junior World Championship, finishing fourteenth overall in the 85 class. Reišulis stepped up to ride three rounds of the EMX125 class towards the end of the season, marking his debut on a 125cc motorcycle. Despite his young age he adapted to the change well, comfortably scoring points and showing further potential by recording a second place race finish.

Staying with the Latvian KTM Motofavorīts team, Reišulis joined his older brother in a full-time campaign for the EMX125 class of the 2022 European Motocross Championship. At the opening round he grabbed his first overall podium, by finishing third. At the third round, on home soil in Latvia, Reišulis took his first race win and in doing so registered a win in the EMX125 class before his older brother. Across the remaining rounds he took two further race wins and his first overall round victory at the deep sand track of Lommel. Third in the final EMX125 standings was coupled with second at the FIM Junior World Championship, where he won the second race. His breakthrough season in 2022 was capped off with him picking up three 125cc national titles. As well as successfully defending his Latvian title, he took the Junior Cup 125 class in the ADAC MX Masters and the 125cc class in the Dutch Masters of Motocross.

With his older brother moving up to the EMX250 class, Reišulis moved to replace him in Yamaha's official EMX125 team for the 2023 European Motocross Championship. Following his strong results in the previous season, Reišulis was the favourite to take the EMX125 title, although once the series was underway he did have to fend off the challenge of Mathis Valin. Out of nine rounds, Reišulis took seven overall wins and twelve individual race wins to become European champion by 60 points over the Frenchman. At the FIM Junior World Championship in Romania however, the roles were reversed, with the Latvian picking up the silver medal for the second year running in the 125 class. Reišulis also successfully defended his Dutch Masters 125cc title in 2023, making him a back-to-back champion in the series.

At the age of fifteen, Reišulis was selected to represent Latvia at the 2023 Motocross des Nations, in the MX2 class. Making his debut on a 250cc motorcycle at the event, he finished his qualifying race in fifteenth, before retiring from his first main race and finishing outside the top-twenty and a lap down in the other.

=== MX2 ===
==== 2024 ====
Following his successful 2024 season, Reišulis was promoted to Yamaha's official team to compete in the EMX250 class. After a strong start to the season at the opening round in Spain, he picked up a knee injury that ruled him out for the rest of 2024, curtailing his rookie season on a 250cc motorcycle.

==== 2025 ====
Retained by the official Yamaha team for the 2025 European Motocross Championship, Reišulis would make up for the missed 2024 season by winning five of the thirteen contested EMX250 rounds. With ten individual race wins to his name, Reišulis would overcome a strong challenge from Noel Zanócz to become European champion. Reišulis also entered the MX2 class at the MXGP of Germany, but ultimately did not start either of the races and so missed out on his Motocross World Championship debut. At the end of the season, Reišulis was named in the Latvian team for the 2025 Motocross des Nations. After finishing his qualifying race in ninth, he finished twenty-seventh and seventeenth in the main races, as the team finished ninth overall.

==== 2026 ====
Reišulis made his full-time world championship debut in the MX2 class of the 2026 FIM Motocross World Championship, joining the Monster Energy Yamaha Factory team. Reišulis had a consistent first half to his debut season, recording five top-six overall finishes across the first nine rounds. A breakthrough came in the tenth round in Portugal, where a second in the opening race contributed to second overall in the event, his first overall podium at world championship level. He followed this up by finishing third overall at the following round in South Africa and another top-three race finish came at the Czech round two rounds later. Reišulis would score his third and final podium of the year at the final round in Australia, to end the championship in sixth in the final standings. He made his third appearance for Latvia at the 2026 Motocross des Nations, where, after he finished fifth in his qualifying race and recorded twentieth and twelfth in his two main races. The nation finished in fourth place, its highest finish in the event to date. In the 2026 Dutch Masters of Motocross, Reišulis took one race win and finished second in the standings behind his older brother by six points.

== Honours ==
FIM Motocross World Championship

- "Jan De Groot" Award: 2026 (gold)

FIM Motocross Junior World Championship

- 125: 2022 & 2023 (silver)

European Motocross Championship

- EMX250: 2025 (gold)
- EMX125: 2023 (gold) , 2022 (bronze)
- EMX85: 2021 (silver)

ADAC MX Masters

- Junior Cup 125: 2022 (gold)

Dutch Masters of Motocross

- 250cc: 2026 (silver)
- 125cc: 2022 & 2023 (gold)

Latvian Motocross Championship

- MX125: 2022 (gold)
- MX85 Senior: 2021 (gold)
- MX85 Junior: 2020 (gold)
- MX65 Senior: 2018 (silver)
- MX50: 2015 (gold)

== Career statistics ==
=== Motocross des Nations ===
Year	Location	Nation	Class	Teammates	Team Overall	Individual Overall
2023	(France) Ernée	LAT	MX2	Pauls Jonass; Kārlis Reišulis	12th	19th
2025	(United States) Ironman	LAT	MX2	Kārlis Reišulis; Pauls Jonass	9th	10th
2026	(France) Ernée	LAT	MX2	Kārlis Reišulis; Pauls Jonass	4th	6th

=== FIM Motocross World Championship ===
==== By season ====
Season	Class	Number	Motorcycle	Team	Race	Race Wins	Overall Wins	Race Top-3	Overall Podium	Pts	Plcd
2025	MX2	772	Yamaha	VHR VRT Yamaha Official EMX250 Team	0	0	0	0	0	0	N/A
2026	MX2	772	Yamaha	Monster Energy Yamaha Factory MX2	38	0	0	4	3	691	6th
Total					38	0	0	4	3	691	
