= 2023 Dutch Masters of Motocross =

Dutch Motocross Competition in 2023

The 2023 Dutch Masters of Motocross season was the 6th Dutch Masters of Motocross season.

The series had three rounds across the eastern part of The Netherlands, running from March to May. Calvin Vlaanderen was the reigning champion in the 500cc class, after winning his first title in 2022. Rick Elzinga was the reigning champion in the 250cc class after he won his first title in the previous season.

Jeffrey Herlings was able to record a perfect season in the 500cc class, winning all three rounds with double race wins. This would be Herlings' fourth Dutch Masters of Motocross title overall and his third in the 500cc class. Kay de Wolf won the 250cc title in similarly dominant fashion, winning all three rounds and five out of six races within that.

== Race calendar and results ==
=== 500cc ===
Round	Date	Location	Race 1 Winner	Race 2 Winner	Round Winner
1	19 March	(Gelderland) Harfsen	(Netherlands) Jeffrey Herlings	(Netherlands) Jeffrey Herlings	(Netherlands) Jeffrey Herlings
2	13 April	(Overijssel) Markelo	(Netherlands) Jeffrey Herlings	(Netherlands) Jeffrey Herlings	(Netherlands) Jeffrey Herlings
3	19 May	(Gelderland) Oldebroek	(Netherlands) Jeffrey Herlings	(Netherlands) Jeffrey Herlings	(Netherlands) Jeffrey Herlings

=== 250cc ===
Round	Date	Location	Race 1 Winner	Race 2 Winner	Round Winner
1	19 March	(Gelderland) Harfsen	(Netherlands) Rick Elzinga	(Netherlands) Kay de Wolf	(Netherlands) Kay de Wolf
2	13 April	(Overijssel) Markelo	(Netherlands) Kay de Wolf	(Netherlands) Kay de Wolf	(Netherlands) Kay de Wolf
3	19 May	(Gelderland) Oldebroek	(Netherlands) Kay de Wolf	(Netherlands) Kay de Wolf	(Netherlands) Kay de Wolf

=== Circuit locations ===
2023 Dutch Masters of Motocross locations

== 500cc ==
=== Participants ===
Team	Constructor	No	Rider	Rounds
Team Gebben van Venrooy Yamaha Racing	Yamaha	1	(Netherlands) Calvin Vlaanderen	All
Brouwer Motors	KTM	2	(Netherlands) Michel Hoenson	3
Brouwer Motors	Husqvarna	826	(Netherlands) Nick Leerkes	All
Kawasaki Racing Team MXGP	Kawasaki	3	(France) Romain Febvre	All
Kawasaki Racing Team MXGP	Kawasaki	43	(Australia) Mitchell Evans	3
De Baets Yamaha MX Team	Yamaha	6	(France) Benoît Paturel	3
	KTM	11	(Netherlands) Tim van Dooijeweerd	1
KMP Honda Racing powered by Krettek	Honda	12	(Germany) Max Nagl	1
KMP Honda Racing powered by Krettek	Honda	707	(Netherlands) Lars van Berkel	All
Van de Laar Racing	KTM	24	(Netherlands) Jordy van Orsouw	All
Team Hannamax Motorsport	KTM	30	(Netherlands) Rene de Jong	All
JM Honda Racing	Honda	32	(Belgium) Brent Van Doninck	All
Pol Motors	Gas Gas	34	(Netherlands) Micha-Boy de Waal	All
Camping Cupido	Yamaha	38	(Netherlands) Marcel Conijn	All
Hannamax Motorsport	KTM	46	(Netherlands) Davy Pootjes	All
Van Dijk MX Products	Kawasaki	47	(Netherlands) Bram van den Hoek	3
Husqvarna Scandinavia	Husqvarna	52	(Sweden) Albin Gerhardsson	1
LL61 Racing	KTM	61	(Netherlands) Lars Looman	All
VisuAlz Production	Husqvarna	66	(Germany) Tim Koch	1
	Kawasaki	68	(United Kingdom) Josh Bentley	3
JWR Honda Racing	Honda	75	(Estonia) Hardi Roosiorg	1
Red Bull KTM Factory Racing	KTM	84	(Netherlands) Jeffrey Herlings	All
MX88 Motorsport	KTM	88	(Netherlands) Freek van der Vlist	1–2
Monster Energy Yamaha Factory MXGP Team	Yamaha	91	(Switzerland) Jeremy Seewer	3
JH-MX Service	Gas Gas	94	(Netherlands) Sven van der Mierden	All
	KTM	96	(Netherlands) Rico Staat	1
	KTM	97	(Sweden) Anton Nagy	1
Eastwood Racing	Honda	103	(United Kingdom) Max Broadbelt	1–2
Motorrad Bauerschmidt	Husqvarna	108	(Germany) Stefan Ekerold	1–2
Bergevoet Doetinchem B.V.	KTM	114	(Netherlands) Damian Bergevoet	1–2
Van der Velden Motoren	KTM	118	(Netherlands) Joël van Mechelen	All
	Husqvarna	121	(Netherlands) Mitchel van den Essenburg	3
KTM Silve Racing	KTM	142	(Finland) Jere Haavisto	1
AIT Racing Team	Yamaha	152	(Bulgaria) Petar Petrov	All
Standing Construct Honda MXGP	Honda	189	(Netherlands) Brian Bogers	1–2
Ovaa Motors	Husqvarna	197	(Netherlands) Jordan-Lee van Maaren	1–2
	KTM	198	(Sweden) Jesper Hansson	1
	Yamaha	217	(Netherlands) Teun Cooymans	All
Enduro Koch Racing	Husqvarna	224	(Czech Republic) Jakub Terešák	1
Becker Racing	Gas Gas	260	(Germany) Nico Koch	1
Becker Racing	Gas Gas	278	(Belgium) Thomas Vermijl	1
Becker Racing	KTM	300	(Germany) Noah Ludwig	1
Nobis MX Team	KTM	303	(Netherlands) Krijn van Vroenhoven	3
Absolut MX	Kawasaki	354	(Sweden) Viking Lindström	1
Lings Offroad	Gas Gas	411	(United Kingdom) Declan Whittle	1
AMX Racing Team	Husqvarna	412	(Denmark) Frederik Goul	2
Team 101%	Yamaha	417	(Estonia) Erki Kahro	2
AMX Racing	KTM	418	(Netherlands) Jeremy de Jong	1, 3
Schepers Racing	Honda	424	(Netherlands) Wesley Schepers	1–2
Stirlings Racing Team	KTM	444	(Netherlands) Jeremy Knuiman	1–2
De Dakencentrale BV	KTM	611	(Netherlands) Patrick Tuin	2–3
MX Magmum	Gas Gas	637	(Latvia) Tomass Sileika	2
Bloody Harry Energy RGS MX Team	Yamaha	750	(Sweden) Samuel Flink	1
KTM Sarholz Racing Team	KTM	811	(United Kingdom) Adam Sterry	All
	Gas Gas	818	(France) Jérémy Hauquier	2–3
Young Motion powered by Resa	Yamaha	822	(Netherlands) Mike Bolink	All
	KTM	853	(Netherlands) Nino Dekker	All
	Yamaha	867	(Belgium) Dimitri Van de Sanden	All
	Kawasaki	891	(Germany) Paul Ullrich	1

=== Riders Championship ===
Points are awarded to finishers of the main races, in the following format:

Position	1st	2nd	3rd	4th	5th	6th	7th	8th	9th	10th	11th	12th	13th	14th	15th	16th	17th	18th	19th	20th+
Points	25	22	20	18	16	15	14	13	12	11	10	9	8	7	6	5	4	3	2	1

Pos	Rider	Bike	HAR (Gelderland)		MAR (Overijssel)		OLD (Gelderland)		Points
1	(Netherlands) Jeffrey Herlings	KTM	1	1	1	1	1	1	150
2	(France) Romain Febvre	Kawasaki	3	2	2	2	2	2	130
3	(Netherlands) Calvin Vlaanderen	Yamaha	4	3	4	4	3	5	110
4	(Belgium) Brent Van Doninck	Honda	2	Ret	3	15	5	4	82
5	(Netherlands) Micha-Boy de Waal	Gas Gas	7	8	7	6	10	8	80
6	(Bulgaria) Petar Petrov	Yamaha	12	5	10	5	7	9	78
7	(Netherlands) Sven van der Mierden	Gas Gas	8	6	8	9	11	10	72
8	(Netherlands) Lars van Berkel	Honda	26	7	11	7	8	7	56
9	(United Kingdom) Adam Sterry	KTM	6	18	6	Ret	15	7	53
10	(Netherlands) Mike Bolink	Yamaha	10	10	13	14	17	16	46
11	(Netherlands) Joël van Mechelen	KTM	Ret	23	9	11	11	14	40
12	(Switzerland) Jeremy Seewer	Yamaha					4	3	38
13	(Netherlands) Brian Bogers	Honda	Ret	DNS	5	3			36
14	(Netherlands) Jeremy Knuiman	KTM	9	11	12	16			36
15	(Netherlands) Marcel Conijn	Yamaha	16	12	17	13	16	17	35
16	(France) Benoît Paturel	Yamaha					6	6	30
17	(Germany) Max Nagl	Honda	5	9					28
18	(Finland) Jere Haavisto	KTM	13	4					26
19	(Germany) Stefan Ekerold	Husqvarna	20	14	16	8			26
20	(Netherlands) Rene de Jong	KTM	15	16	Ret	DNS	14	13	26
21	(Netherlands) Freek van der Vlist	KTM	11	33	18	10			25
22	(Australia) Mitchell Evans	Kawasaki					8	10	24
23	(Netherlands) Nick Leerkes	Husqvarna	19	20	15	17	Ret	15	19
24	(Latvia) Tomass Sileika	Gas Gas			14	12			16
25	(Netherlands) Davy Pootjes	KTM	24	Ret	Ret	20	9	Ret	14
26	(Germany) Noah Ludwig	KTM	18	13					11
27	(Czech Republic) Jakub Terešák	Husqvarna	14	17					11
28	(Germany) Tim Koch	Husqvarna	23	15					7
29	(Belgium) Dimitri Van de Sanden	Yamaha	27	25	27	21	25	19	7
30	(France) Jérémy Hauquier	KTM			21	19	18	21	7
31	(Netherlands) Teun Cooymans	Yamaha	35	32	25	28	23	24	6
32	(Estonia) Erki Kahro	Yamaha			19	18			5
33	(Netherlands) Jordy van Orsouw	KTM	34	Ret	23	22	21	20	5
34	(Netherlands) Nino Dekker	KTM	33	28	20	24	Ret	22	5
35	(Netherlands) Mitchel van den Essenburg	Husqvarna					20	18	4
36	(Netherlands) Wesley Schepers	Honda	30	26	22	23			4
37	(Netherlands) Lars Looman	KTM	DNQ	DNQ	30	27	24	25	4
38	(Sweden) Anton Nagy	KTM	17	Ret					4
39	(Germany) Nico Koch	Gas Gas	21	19					3
40	(Netherlands) Bram van den Hoek	Kawasaki					19	26	3
41	(Netherlands) Patrick Tuin	KTM			31	29	Ret	27	3
42	(Netherlands) Jordan-Lee van Maaren	Husqvarna	31	31	26	Ret			3
43	(Sweden) Albin Gerhardsson	Husqvarna	22	21					2
44	(Sweden) Viking Lindström	Kawasaki	25	22					2
45	(Netherlands) Michel Hoenson	KTM					22	23	2
46	(Belgium) Thomas Vermijl	Gas Gas	28	24					2
47	(Denmark) Frederik Goul	Husqvarna			29	25			2
48	(United Kingdom) Max Broadbelt	Honda	DNQ	DNQ	28	26			2
49	(Germany) Paul Ullrich	Kawasaki	29	27					2
50	(Netherlands) Rico Staat	KTM	36	29					2
51	(Sweden) Jesper Hansson	KTM	32	30					2
52	(Netherlands) Damian Bergevoet	KTM	DNQ	DNQ	24	Ret			1
53	(United Kingdom) Declan Whittle	Gas Gas	Ret	34					1
	(Estonia) Hardi Roosiorg	Honda	Ret	Ret					0
	(United Kingdom) Josh Bentley	Kawasaki					Ret	DNS	0
	(Netherlands) Tim van Dooijeweerd	KTM	DNQ	Ret					0
	(Netherlands) Jeremy de Jong	KTM	DNQ	DNQ			DNS	DNS	0
	(Netherlands) Krijn van Vroenhoven	KTM					DNS	DNS	0
	(Sweden) Samuel Flink	Yamaha	DNQ	DNQ					0
Pos	Rider	Bike	HAR (Gelderland)		MAR (Overijssel)		OLD (Gelderland)		Points

== 250cc ==
=== Participants ===
Team	Constructor	No	Rider	Rounds
	Husqvarna	3	(Netherlands) Sander Hofstede	1, 3
	Honda	4	(Belgium) Thallon Caspermans	1
SixtySeven Racing Team	Husqvarna	11	(Germany) Jan Krug	1
WZ Racing Team	KTM	12	(Denmark) Mikkel Haarup	2–3
WZ Racing Team	KTM	51	(Spain) Oriol Oliver	All
WZ Racing Team	KTM	131	(Germany) Cato Nickel	1
Henri Pluim Racing	Yamaha	14	(Netherlands) Remco van Laar	1
	Yamaha	15	(Netherlands) Svenn Borger	All
	Kawasaki	16	(Netherlands) Roan Bekkers	1, 3
	KTM	21	(Netherlands) Greg van der Weide	All
F&H Kawasaki MX2 Racing Team	Kawasaki	24	(Norway) Kevin Horgmo	3
JTX Racing	KTM	27	(United Kingdom) Chris Mills	1–2
Pol Transport B.V.	KTM	28	(Netherlands) Ivo Pol	All
	Husqvarna	30	(Netherlands) Mats Leeuwesteijn	3
Hutten Metaal Yamaha	Yamaha	32	(Italy) Andrea Bonacorsi	All
Hutten Metaal Yamaha	Yamaha	147	(Latvia) Kārlis Reišulis	All
Hutten Metaal Yamaha	Yamaha	432	(Netherlands) Ivano van Erp	All
Husqvarna BT Racing Team	Husqvarna	33	(Netherlands) Kay Karssemakers	All
Husqvarna BT Racing Team	Husqvarna	83	(France) Maxime Grau	1–2
Husqvarna BT Racing Team	Husqvarna	288	(Argentina) Ignacio Liprandi	2
Husqvarna BT Racing Team	Husqvarna	563	(Belgium) Wesly Dieudonné	1, 3
	Yamaha	35	(Netherlands) Ward Monkel	2–3
KTM SB Racing Team	KTM	36	(Switzerland) Nico Greutmann	1
KTM SB Racing Team	KTM	489	(Netherlands) Jens Walvoort	1
Hofstede MX Team	Husqvarna	38	(Netherlands) Karl Timmerman	2–3
Hofstede MX Team	Husqvarna	86	(Netherlands) Jesper Gils	All
Nestaan Husqvarna Factory Racing	Husqvarna	39	(Netherlands) Roan van de Moosdijk	All
Nestaan Husqvarna Factory Racing	Husqvarna	74	(Netherlands) Kay de Wolf	All
Sturm STC Racing	Gas Gas	43	(Latvia) Roberts Lūsis	1
Monster Energy Yamaha Factory MX2 Team	Yamaha	44	(Netherlands) Rick Elzinga	1–2
Van Dijk MX Products	Kawasaki	47	(Netherlands) Bram van den Hoek	1
Absolut MX	Kawasaki	50	(Sweden) Rasmus Andersson	1
Buitenhuis Racing	Yamaha	77	(Netherlands) Kevin Buitenhuis	3
Buitenhuis Racing	KTM	166	(Netherlands) Jordy de Vries	1, 3
	KTM	100	(Netherlands) Danny van den Bosse	All
Arcabo Ten Kate Motoren	Honda	101	(Netherlands) Mirco ten Kate	All
VIP Lounge MX Team	KTM	111	(Netherlands) Romano Aspers	2–3
Vema Beton	Gas Gas	114	(Belgium) Nicolas Vennekens	All
JM Honda Racing	Honda	122	(South Africa) Camden McLellan	3
JM Honda Racing	Honda	912	(United Kingdom) Joel Rizzi	2
Riley Racing	Yamaha	912	(United Kingdom) Joel Rizzi	1
	KTM	124	(Netherlands) Didier van Kasteren	1, 3
	KTM	128	(Netherlands) Kyle van Zutphen	3
JP Xtreme Xperience	Yamaha	129	(Norway) Sander Agard-Michelsen	All
Lexa MX Racing Team	Husqvarna	132	(United Kingdom) Calum Mitchell	All
Lexa MX Racing Team	Husqvarna	684	(Latvia) Uldis Freibergs	All
	KTM	144	(Netherlands) Jelle Bankers	2–3
Laurense Motors	Kawasaki	148	(Netherlands) Robert Fobbe	All
HM Racing Team	Husqvarna	171	(Germany) Fynn-Niklas Tornau	1
Fantic Factory Team Maddii	Fantic	172	(Netherlands) Cas Valk	1, 3
MBP Motocross Team	KTM	191	(Lithuania) Erlandas Mackonis	2
Team Hannamax Motorsport	KTM	199	(Netherlands) Joshua van der Linden	3
Team Hannamax Motorsport	KTM	422	(Netherlands) Tyler Eltink	All
Team Hannamax Motorsport	KTM	824	(Netherlands) Rick Bouman	2–3
GT Husqvarna MX Team	Husqvarna	201	(Netherlands) Robin van Oldeniel	All
	KTM	228	(Netherlands) Gijs Oud Ammerveld	1
Falcon Motorsports	KTM	306	(Germany) Julian Duvier	1
Young Motion powered by Resa	Yamaha	313	(Czech Republic) Petr Polák	2–3
	Yamaha	336	(Netherlands) Mika Ritsema	All
HPM Racing	Gas Gas	339	(Denmark) Victor Kleemann	1
PowerbyJJ Racing Team	Husqvarna	388	(Sweden) Filip Olsson	1
	Gas Gas	397	(Sweden) Axel Nilsson	1
KMP Honda Racing powered by Krettek	Honda	408	(Netherlands) Scott Smulders	All
Brouwer Motors	KTM	411	(Netherlands) Kjeld Stuurman	All
Mellendijk Motor Parts	Husqvarna	419	(Netherlands) Jan Spliethof	1
Quality MX	KTM	426	(Netherlands) Kevin Klijn	1
Becker Racing	Gas Gas	440	(Germany) Marnique Appelt	1
	KTM	441	(Netherlands) Dirk Winder	All
KTM Sarholz Racing Team	KTM	470	(Germany) Peter König	1
Jø Honda Racing	Honda	474	(Denmark) Magnus Gregersen	1
Alf Graarud Motor Yamaha Scandinavia	Yamaha	487	(Norway) Elias Auclair	1, 3
Fantic Nederland	Fantic	521	(Netherlands) Boris Blanken	All
	KTM	522	(Germany) Dominik Grau	3
Motor Centrum Eibergen	KTM	555	(Netherlands) Max Schwarte	All
KTM Kosak Team	KTM	568	(Sweden) Max Pålsson	1
KTM Silve Racing	KTM	595	(Finland) Eliel Lehtinen	1
Motor2000 KTM Racing Team	KTM	601	(United Kingdom) Kelton Gwyther	1–2
Pol Motors	Gas Gas	612	(Estonia) Joosep Pärn	1–2
Janssen Sierhekwerk	KTM	715	(Netherlands) Jaap Janssen	All
	KTM	726	(Netherlands) Xander Vossebeld	1–2
WPM KTM Team	KTM	814	(Netherlands) Maik Verhoef	All
	KTM	817	(Netherlands) Raf Meuwissen	3
NGR Racing Products	KTM	843	(Netherlands) Daniel Wendels	All
Schepers Racing	KTM	881	(Netherlands) Sven Dijk	3

=== Riders Championship ===
Points are awarded to finishers of the main races, in the following format:

Position	1st	2nd	3rd	4th	5th	6th	7th	8th	9th	10th	11th	12th	13th	14th	15th	16th	17th	18th	19th	20th+
Points	25	22	20	18	16	15	14	13	12	11	10	9	8	7	6	5	4	3	2	1

Pos	Rider	Bike	HAR (Gelderland)		MAR (Overijssel)		OLD (Gelderland)		Points
1	(Netherlands) Kay de Wolf	Husqvarna	2	1	1	1	1	1	147
2	(Netherlands) Roan van de Moosdijk	Husqvarna	3	3	6	2	2	3	119
3	(Italy) Andrea Bonacorsi	Yamaha	4	4	3	7	4	7	102
4	(Netherlands) Rick Elzinga	Yamaha	1	2	2	3			89
5	(Netherlands) Kay Karssemakers	Husqvarna	7	7	5	9	5	5	88
6	(Latvia) Kārlis Reišulis	Yamaha	5	6	10	8	11	4	83
7	(Netherlands) Ivano van Erp	Yamaha	15	5	13	6	6	2	82
8	(Spain) Oriol Oliver	KTM	6	15	11	5	8	8	73
9	(Norway) Sander Agard-Michelsen	Yamaha	12	27	7	14	12	10	51
10	(Denmark) Mikkel Haarup	KTM			4	4	7	Ret	50
11	(Netherlands) Boris Blanken	Fantic	9	11	8	13	Ret	DNS	43
12	(Netherlands) Scott Smulders	Honda	14	10	16	10	15	Ret	40
13	(Czech Republic) Petr Polák	Yamaha			9	12	16	11	36
14	(Norway) Kevin Horgmo	Kawasaki					3	6	35
15	(United Kingdom) Joel Rizzi	Yamaha	13	8					33
15	(United Kingdom) Joel Rizzi	Honda			15	15			33
16	(France) Maxime Grau	Husqvarna	28	14	12	11			27
17	(United Kingdom) Calum Mitchell	Husqvarna	23	16	14	16	21	14	26
18	(Germany) Cato Nickel	KTM	8	9					25
19	(Netherlands) Cas Valk	Fantic	Ret	Ret			10	9	23
20	(Netherlands) Kjeld Stuurman	KTM	21	21	Ret	18	13	12	22
21	(Belgium) Wesly Dieudonné	Husqvarna	Ret	12			18	13	20
22	(Sweden) Max Pålsson	KTM	11	18					13
23	(Netherlands) Jens Walvoort	KTM	10	19					13
24	(Netherlands) Robert Fobbe	Kawasaki	16	Ret	21	Ret	14	Ret	13
25	(South Africa) Camden McLellan	Honda					9	Ret	12
26	(Netherlands) Robin van Oldeniel	Husqvarna	29	26	18	17	DNQ	DNQ	9
27	(Netherlands) Greg van der Weide	KTM	18	30	17	20	Ret	DNS	9
28	(Sweden) Filip Olsson	Husqvarna	Ret	13					8
29	(Netherlands) Mirco ten Kate	Honda	25	25	22	22	24	18	8
30	(Netherlands) Raf Meuwissen	KTM					20	15	7
31	(Netherlands) Joshua van der Linden	KTM					19	16	7
32	(Netherlands) Max Schwarte	KTM	DNQ	DNQ	20	21	22	17	7
33	(Norway) Elias Auclair	Yamaha	26	29			17	Ret	6
34	(Germany) Peter König	KTM	20	17					5
35	(Belgium) Nicolas Vennekens	Gas Gas	DNQ	DNQ	25	27	27	19	5
36	(Germany) Marnique Appelt	Gas Gas	17	20					5
37	(Lithuania) Erlandas Mackonis	KTM			19	19			4
38	(Netherlands) Jaap Janssen	KTM	DNQ	36	Ret	23	23	22	4
39	(Netherlands) Ivo Pol	KTM	DNQ	DNQ	31	32	28	23	4
40	(Netherlands) Karl Timmerman	Husqvarna			27	30	32	25	4
41	(Netherlands) Danny van den Bosse	KTM	DNQ	DNQ	33	25	29	26	4
42	(Netherlands) Ward Monkel	Yamaha			32	35	33	28	4
43	(Netherlands) Tyler Eltink	KTM	36	34	34	33	DNQ	DNQ	4
44	(Switzerland) Nico Greutmann	KTM	19	24					3
45	(Latvia) Uldis Freibergs	Husqvarna	DNQ	DNQ	24	24	25	Ret	3
46	(Netherlands) Dirk Winder	KTM	DNQ	DNQ	26	28	31	Ret	3
47	(Netherlands) Sven Dijk	KTM					26	20	2
48	(Netherlands) Kyle van Zutphen	KTM					30	21	2
49	(Germany) Jan Krug	Husqvarna	22	22					2
50	(Sweden) Rasmus Andersson	Kawasaki	30	23					2
51	(Netherlands) Svenn Borger	Yamaha	DNQ	DNQ	DNQ	DNQ	34	27	2
52	(Denmark) Victor Kleemann	Gas Gas	24	28					2
53	(Netherlands) Jesper Gils	Husqvarna	DNQ	DNQ	29	29	DNQ	DNQ	2
54	(Netherlands) Mika Ritsema	Yamaha	DNQ	DNQ	30	31	DNQ	DNQ	2
55	(Germany) Fynn-Niklas Tornau	Husqvarna	32	31					2
56	(Netherlands) Bram van den Hoek	Kawasaki	31	32					2
57	(Latvia) Roberts Lūsis	Gas Gas	34	33					2
58	(Sweden) Axel Nilsson	Gas Gas	33	35					2
59	(United Kingdom) Chris Mills	KTM	27	DNS	23	Ret			2
60	(Netherlands) Kevin Buitenhuis	Yamaha					DNQ	24	1
61	(Estonia) Joosep Pärn	Gas Gas			Ret	26			1
62	(Netherlands) Rick Bouman	Gas Gas			28	DNS	DNQ	DNQ	1
63	(Netherlands) Xander Vossebeld	KTM	DNQ	DNQ	Ret	34			1
64	(Netherlands) Jan Spliethof	Husqvarna	35	Ret					1
	(Netherlands) Jelle Bankers	KTM			Ret	Ret	Ret	Ret	0
	(Netherlands) Romano Aspers	KTM			Ret	DNS	Ret	DNS	0
	(Netherlands) Maik Verhoef	KTM	DNQ	DNQ	DNQ	Ret	DNQ	DNQ	0
	(Netherlands) Sander Hofstede	Husqvarna	DNQ	DNQ			Ret	DNS	0
	(Netherlands) Mats Leeuwesteijn	Husqvarna					Ret	DNS	0
	(Denmark) Magnus Gregersen	Honda	DNS	DNS					0
	(Netherlands) Daniel Wendels	KTM	DNQ	DNQ	DNQ	DNQ	DNQ	DNQ	0
	(United Kingdom) Kelton Gwyther	KTM	DNQ	DNQ	DNQ	DNQ			0
	(Netherlands) Roan Bekkers	Kawasaki	DNQ	DNQ			DNQ	DNQ	0
	(Netherlands) Didier van Kasteren	KTM	DNQ	DNQ			DNQ	DNQ	0
	(Netherlands) Jordy de Vries	KTM	DNQ	DNQ			DNQ	DNQ	0
	(Finland) Eliel Lehtinen	KTM	DNQ	DNQ					0
	(Germany) Julian Duvier	KTM	DNQ	DNQ					0
	(Netherlands) Kevin Klijn	KTM	DNQ	DNQ					0
	(Belgium) Thallon Caspermans	Honda	DNQ	DNQ					0
	(Netherlands) Remco van Laar	Yamaha	DNQ	DNQ					0
	(Netherlands) Gijs Oud Ammerveld	KTM	DNQ	DNQ					0
	(Argentina) Ignacio Liprandi	Husqvarna			DNQ	DNQ			0
	(Germany) Dominik Grau	KTM					DNQ	DNQ	0
Pos	Rider	Bike	HAR (Gelderland)		MAR (Overijssel)		OLD (Gelderland)		Points
