= Rick Elzinga =

Dutch motocross racer

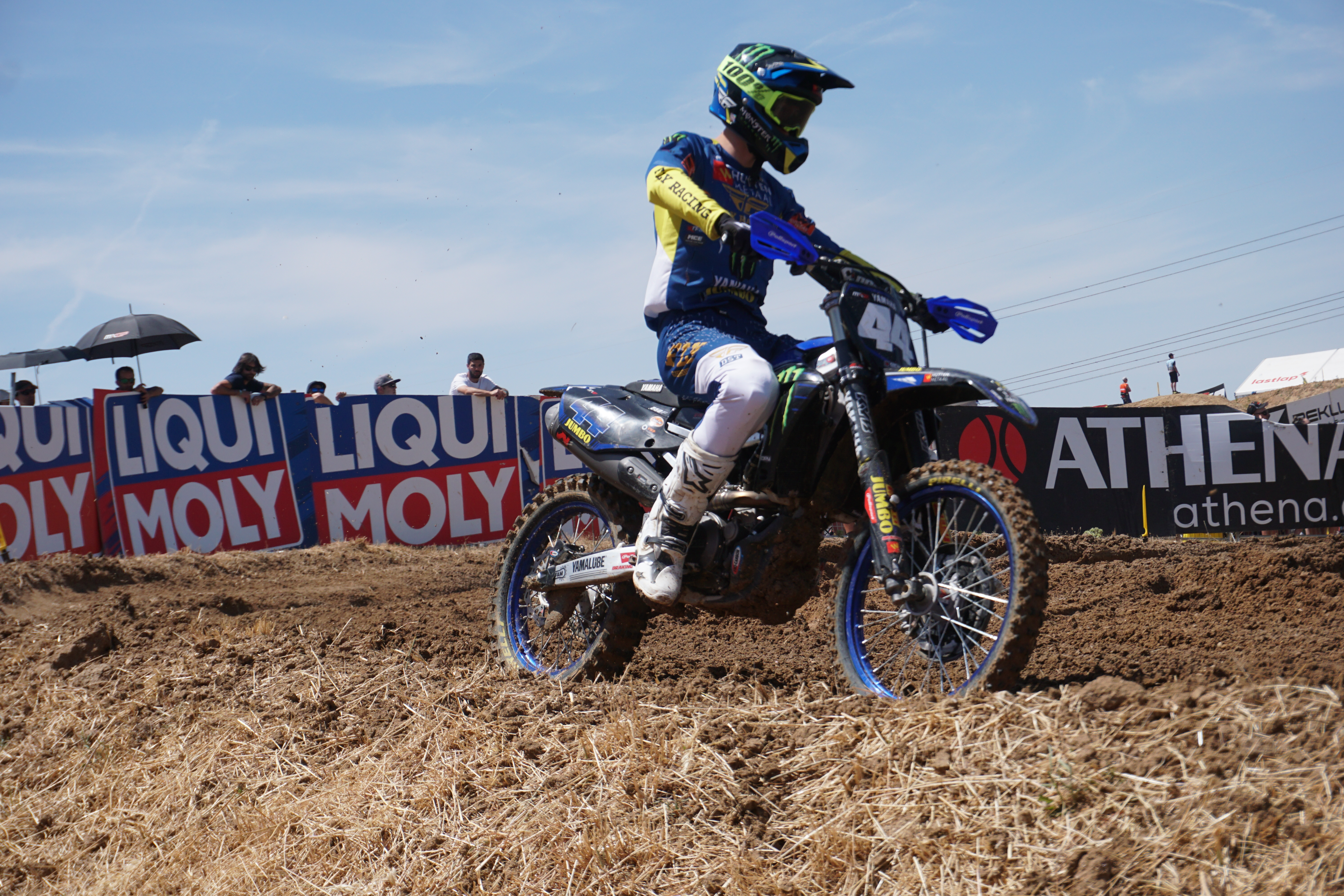
- Nationality: Dutch
- Born: 1 November 2002 (age 24); Zenderen, Netherlands

Rick Elzinga (born 1 November 2002) is a Dutch professional Motocross racer. Elzinga won the 2022 European Motocross Championship in the EMX250 class.

Elzinga rode for the Monster Energy Yamaha Factory MX2 Team within the FIM Motocross World Championship from 2023-2025. He is a two-time Dutch Masters of Motocross Champion in the 250 class.

Elzinga is a two-time podium finisher in the MX2 class. Both of his podiums were achieved during the 2024 FIM Motocross World Championship.

== Career ==
=== Junior career ===
Elzinga first came to international attention in the EMX150 class of the 2014 European Motocross Championship, finishing second overall at the opening round as a wildcard after winning the opening race. Outside of this he was competing on an 85cc motorcycle mainly, riding at the EMX85 championship in Finland and finishing ninth overall. He continued competing on an 85 for 2015 and at that years EMX85 championship in Latvia, he managed to win the opening race. Elzinga did not finish the second race, meaning he ended seventh overall. On the back of this, he finished fifth overall in the 85 class of that year's FIM Motocross Junior World Championship in Spain.

Elzinga moved up to compete on board a 125 machine in 2016. In that year's EMX125 class, he achieved multiple points scoring finishes across the season, with a best of eighth in the second race in Mantua. For the 2017 European Motocross Championship, Elzinga's team, MJC Yamaha, was made Yamaha's official team in the EMX125 championship. He again had several points scoring finishes but missed two rounds, achieving a best position of sixth in the first race in Belgium. In addition to this, Elzinga was able to finish ninth overall in the 125 class of 2017 Junior World Championship, with a fifth in the second race improving his final overall result.

Elzinga broke both wrists in the 2018 Internazionli d'Italia pre-season championship meant a late start to the 2018 European Motocross Championship. He was only able to ride three rounds of the series, but managed to take his first two EMX125 overall podiums in two of those. Elzinga made the long trip to Australia for the that season's Junior World Championship, where he finished sixth overall.

=== 250 Career ===
Elzinga moved up to the EMX250 class in 2019, staying within the official Yamaha structure as part of the SDM Corse team. After a tough opening round where he did not score in either race, Elzinga consistent point scorer, with two sixth place race finishes being the highlight before finishing tenth in the final standings. After an injury ended his 2019 season, he had to start his own private team in 2020 due to losing his place within the Yamaha official setup. Later in the year he joined the TBS Conversions KTM team, recording two eighth-place finishes in the EMX250 class of the 2020 European Motocross Championship.

Staying with TBS Conversions for 2021, Elzinga would return to a full-time campaign in the EMX250 class for the 2021 European Motocross Championship. This would be his best season at European level up to that point, including winning his home round in Oss. He would win a race at the following round and picked up a further four overall podiums to finish third in the final standings. Despite his good results, Elzinga was faced with potentially being left without a ride for the following season. After this fact was publicised in several interviews, he was able link up with a fan forum member in the USA who helped him to compete in two rounds of that season's AMA National Motocross Championship in the USA.

Elzinga was eventually welcomed back into the Yamaha fold for the 2022 European Motocross Championship, re-joining the official EMX250 team now in the hands of the Hutten Metaal squad. This would end up being a highly successful partnership, with him taking four overall wins and five race wins along the way. He made four wildcard starts in the MX2 class of the 2022 FIM Motocross World Championship alongside this, making his debut in Trentino and scoring two seventh-place finishes as his best results across those appearances. Domestically, he would go on to win the 2022 Dutch Masters of Motocross in the MX2 class. After his title winning season, Elzinga was signed by the Monster Energy Yamaha Factory MX2 Team for a full-time campaign in the 2023 FIM Motocross World Championship. He showed good speed throughout the season and consistently placed within the top-ten. Third place in the first race in Sweden was the highlight of the season, as he finished tenth in the final standings despite missing two rounds with a collarbone injury.

The 2024 FIM Motocross World Championship saw Elzinga achieve his first two overall podiums in the MX2 class. The first of these came in the deep mud at the Portuguese round whilst the second came at the Belgian round in Lommel. Elzinga was leading the second race at the Lommel round and looked to be on course for his first race win until a bike issue saw him drop back. After missing the final round of the season due to injury, he finished seventh in the final standings. This was coupled with him winning the 250 class of the 2024 Dutch Masters of Motocross, his second domestic title in this category. The start to Elzinga's 2025 FIM Motocross World Championship was impacted by a broken elbow sustained prior to the start of the season. He lined up despite this and faced further injury problems throughout the year, causing him to miss three rounds. These struggles saw him fail to land on the overall podium, with a third in the final race of the year being his best race result.

=== 450 Career ===
Due to aging out of the MX2 class, Elzinga needed to move to the MXGP class from 2026 onwards. He signed for the Team Beta MRT Racing squad for his debut campaign in the class. For the second year in a row however, Elzinga picked up a pre-season injury, this time to his knee. After missing the first two rounds, Elzinga would only complete three rounds for Beta's factory team, with the partnership ending before the French grand prix with no points scored. Joining the KTM Van Venrooy team for the rest of the season, Elzinga's results took an immediate upturn and he would end the series in twenty-second place.

== Honours ==
European Motocross Championship

- EMX250: 2022 (gold) , 2021 (bronze)

Dutch Masters of Motocross

- 250cc: 2022 & 2024 (gold)

== Career statistics ==
=== FIM Motocross World Championship ===
==== By season ====
Season	Class	Number	Motorcycle	Team	Race	Race Wins	Overall Wins	Race Top-3	Overall Podium	Pts	Plcd
2022	MX2	44	Yamaha	Hutten Metaal Yamaha	6	0	0	0	0	49	23rd
2023	MX2	44	Yamaha	Monster Energy Yamaha Factory MX2 Team	35	0	0	1	0	394	10th
2024	MX2	44	Yamaha	Monster Energy Yamaha Factory MX2 Team	38	0	0	2	2	555	7th
2025	MX2	4	Yamaha	Monster Energy Yamaha Factory MX2 Team	32	0	0	1	0	338	13th
2026	MXGP	4	Beta	MRT Racing Team Beta	6	0	0	0	0	0	22nd
2026	MXGP	4	KTM	Van Venrooy KTM Racing	20	0	0	0	0	88	22nd
Total					137	0	0	4	2	1424	

=== AMA National Motocross Championship ===
==== By season ====
Season	Class	Number	Motorcycle	Team	Races	Race Wins	Overall Wins	Race Top-3	Overall Podium	Pts	Plcd
2021	250	772	KTM	AEO Powersports KTM	4	0	0	0	0	9	35th
Total					4	0	0	0	0	9	
