= Jago Geerts =

Belgian motorcycle racer

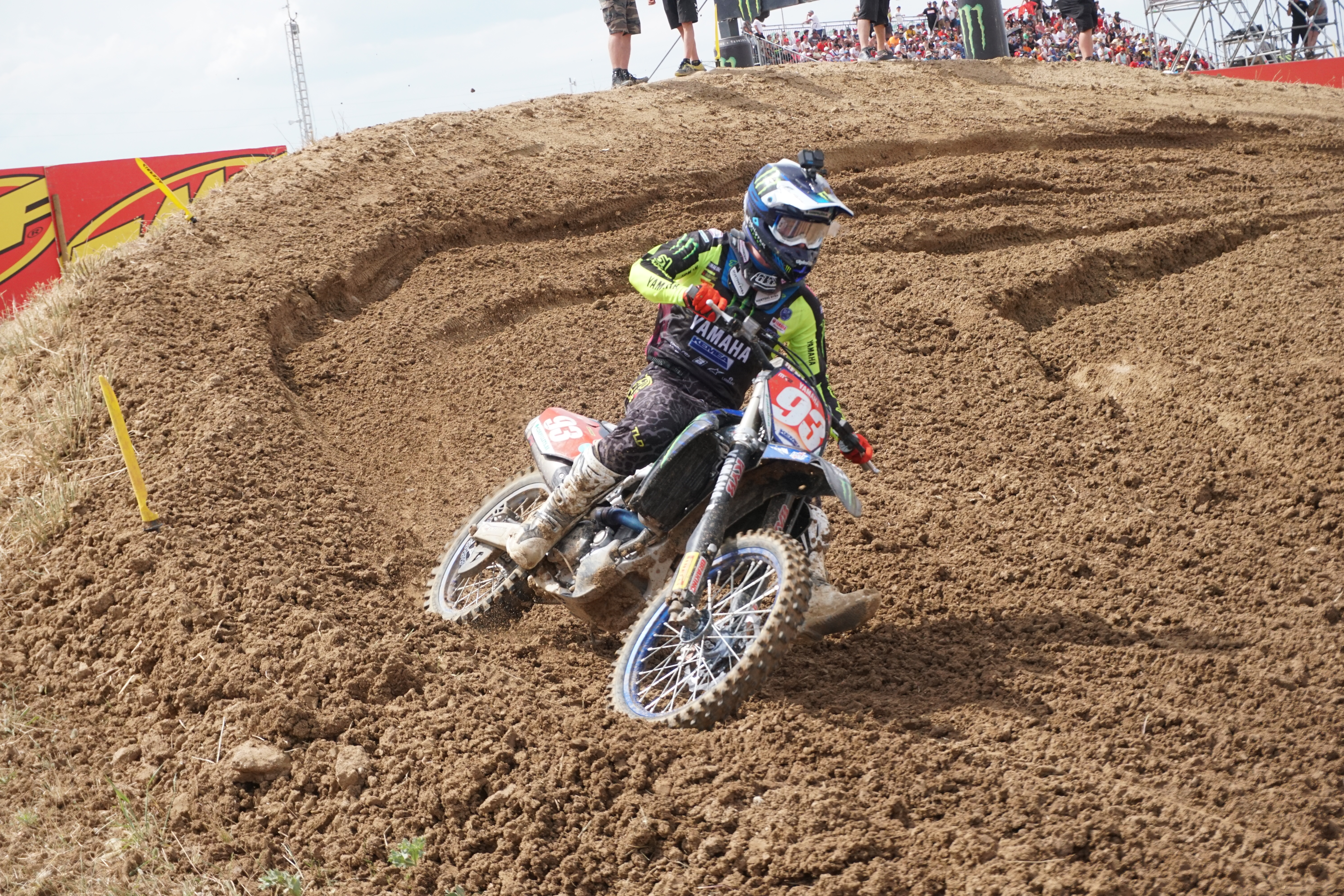
- Geerts in 2022
- Nationality: (Belgium) Belgian
- Born: 21 April 2000 (age 26) Geel, Belgium

Motocross career
- Years active: 2017-Present
- Teams: •Monster Energy Yamaha Factory MXGP Team (2017-2025); •MRT Racing Team Beta (2025-Present)
- Championships: •2014 EMX 85cc; •2016 EMX 125cc; •2016 FIM 125cc
- Wins: •MX2: 24
- GP debut: 2017, GP of Belgium, MX2
- First GP win: 2020, GP of Great Britain, MX2

Jago Geerts (born 21 April 2000) is a Belgian professional motocross rider who has competed in the Motocross World Championships since 2017. He finished second in the MX2 World Championship from 2020 to 2023.

== Motocross Career ==
=== 2014 ===
In 2014, Geerts won the 85cc European Championship and placed fifth in the 85cc Junior World Championship.

=== 2016 ===
2016 saw Geerts win both the 125cc European Motocross Championship and the 125cc Junior Motocross World Championship.

=== 2017 ===
In 2017, Geerts placed eighth in the 250cc European Motocross Championship. He made his debut in the MX2 World Championship at the GP of Belgium.

=== 2022 ===
Geerts fell short of the 2022 MX2 World Championship by four points. He was the winner of six Grand Prix’s and missed out on the podium only twice all season.

=== 2023 ===
Heading into the 2023 season, Geerts was a strong favourite for the MX2 Championship, having finished second three years in a row. He won three of the first six rounds until being sidelined by injury. He returned at round nine & won three of the next five rounds until bad luck struck again and injury ended his championship hopes. He ended the season second in points with eight Grand Prix wins, furthermore ending his successful MX2 career with 24 GP wins.

=== 2024 ===
Geerts' rookie MXGP campaign began with high expectations but was abruptly halted at the opening round in Argentina. After a crash on the start straight in the qualifying race, he suffered a crash that resulted in a fractured left elbow and right clavicle, necessitating surgery and a prolonged recovery period. After months of rehabilitation, Geerts made his return at the MXGP of Flanders. He managed to score points in seven Grand Prix events, with his best finish being eighth place. Despite his efforts, he concluded the season 33rd in the championship standings with 19 points .

== MXGP Results ==
Year	Rnd 1	Rnd 2	Rnd 3	Rnd 4	Rnd 5	Rnd 6	Rnd 7	Rnd 8	Rnd 9	Rnd 10	Rnd 11	Rnd 12	Rnd 13	Rnd 14	Rnd 15	Rnd 16	Rnd 17	Rnd 18	Rnd 19	Rnd 20	Average Finish	Podium Percent	Place
2018 MX2	9	7	21	10	18	9	2	10	11	4	6	6	16	9	4	OUT	OUT	OUT	10	7	9.35	6%	8th
2019 MX2	8	9	3	2	9	2	6	3	2	15	10	9	5	10	4	11	2	4	-	-	6.33	33%	3rd
2020 MX2	1	3	6	1	1	2	4	2	9	7	1	2	2	3	9	1	1	12	-	-	3.72	67%	2nd
2021 MX2	12	11	3	1	6	1	2	6	8	4	4	5	6	2	2	17	1	1	-	-	5.11	44%	2nd
2022 MX2	3	1	2	3	11	1	1	2	3	2	2	4	1	1	1	3	3	2	-	-	2.55	89%	2nd
2023 MX2	1	1	5	3	1	2	OUT	OUT	9	3	1	1	1	DNF	OUT	4	3	1	1	-	2.47	80%	2nd
2024 MXGP	DNS	OUT	OUT	OUT	OUT	OUT	OUT	OUT	OUT	OUT	OUT	OUT	OUT	DNS	11	DNS	OUT	OUT	OUT	OUT	11.00	-	33rd
2025 MXGP	8	21	24	10	14	12	12	16	15	11	6	DNF	9	8	DNF	OUT	10	12	10	DNF	12.40	-	12th
2026 MXGP	31 ARG (Argentina)	14 AND (Andalusia)	18 SUI (Switzerland)	21 SAR (Sardinia)	22 TRE	15 FRA (France)	20 GER (Germany)	13 LAT (Latvia)	14 ITA (Italy)	15 POR (Portugal)	OUT RSA (South Africa)	12 GBR (United Kingdom)	7 CZE (Czech Republic)	12 FLA (Flanders)	18 SWE (Sweden)	10 NED (Netherlands)	13 TUR (Turkey)	9 CHN (China)	9 AUS (Australia)	-	15.16	-	14th
