= 2025 FIM Motocross World Championship =

World championship of motocross in 2025

The 2025 FIM Motocross World Championship was the 69th FIM Motocross World Championship season.

In the MXGP class, Jorge Prado won his fourth world title in the 2024 season, however, he did not defend his title due to his move to compete in the America-based SuperMotocross World Championship series. Frenchman Romain Febvre ended the season as world champion in the MXGP class, winning his second title ten years after his first. Alongside this achievement, the championship was the first for a Kawasaki rider in the premier class.

The reigning MX2 world champion, Kay de Wolf, was not able to defend the maiden title he won in the previous season. Simon Längenfelder took his first title in the category, finishing ahead of de Wolf by 9 points in the final standings.

== Race calendar and results ==
A provisional calendar was released on 10 December 2024. The championship was contested over twenty rounds in Europe, Asia, South America and Australia.

The planned thirteenth round in Indonesia was cancelled on 6 March, being replaced by a round at a new track at the Kymi Ring in Finland.

=== MXGP ===
Round	Date	Grand Prix	Location	Pole position	Race 1 Winner	Race 2 Winner	Round Winner	Report
1	2 March	MXGP of Argentina	Córdoba	(France) Maxime Renaux	(France) Romain Febvre	(France) Maxime Renaux	(France) Maxime Renaux	
2	16 March	MXGP of Castilla–La Mancha	Cózar	(Slovenia) Tim Gajser	(Slovenia) Tim Gajser	(Slovenia) Tim Gajser	(Slovenia) Tim Gajser	
3	23 March	MXGP of Europe	Saint-Jean-d'Angély	(Belgium) Lucas Coenen	(Slovenia) Tim Gajser	(Slovenia) Tim Gajser	(Slovenia) Tim Gajser	
4	6 April	(Sardinia) MXGP of Sardegna	Riola Sardo	(Slovenia) Tim Gajser	(Belgium) Lucas Coenen	(France) Romain Febvre	(France) Romain Febvre	
5	13 April	MXGP of Trentino	Pietramurata	(France) Romain Febvre	(Slovenia) Tim Gajser	(Slovenia) Tim Gajser	(Slovenia) Tim Gajser	
6	19 & 21 April	MXGP of Switzerland	Frauenfeld	(Spain) Rubén Fernández	(Belgium) Lucas Coenen	(Belgium) Lucas Coenen	(Belgium) Lucas Coenen	
7	4 May	MXGP of Portugal	Águeda	(Belgium) Lucas Coenen	(Belgium) Lucas Coenen	(Belgium) Lucas Coenen	(Belgium) Lucas Coenen	
8	11 May	MXGP of Spain	Lugo	(Belgium) Jago Geerts	(France) Romain Febvre	(Belgium) Lucas Coenen	(France) Romain Febvre	
9	25 May	MXGP of France	Ernée	(Belgium) Lucas Coenen	(Belgium) Lucas Coenen	(France) Romain Febvre	(France) Romain Febvre	
10	1 June	MXGP of Germany	Teutschenthal	(Belgium) Lucas Coenen	(Belgium) Lucas Coenen	(Netherlands) Jeffrey Herlings	(Netherlands) Jeffrey Herlings	
11	8 June	MXGP of Latvia	Ķegums	(Netherlands) Jeffrey Herlings	(Netherlands) Jeffrey Herlings	(Netherlands) Jeffrey Herlings	(Netherlands) Jeffrey Herlings	
12	22 June	(United Kingdom) MXGP of Great Britain	Matterley Basin	(Netherlands) Jeffrey Herlings	(Netherlands) Glenn Coldenhoff	(France) Romain Febvre	(France) Romain Febvre	
13	13 July	MXGP of Finland	Iitti - Kymi Ring	(Belgium) Lucas Coenen	(Belgium) Lucas Coenen	(Belgium) Lucas Coenen	(Belgium) Lucas Coenen	
14	27 July	MXGP of Czech Republic	Loket	(France) Romain Febvre	(Belgium) Lucas Coenen	(France) Romain Febvre	(Belgium) Lucas Coenen	
15	3 August	MXGP of Flanders	Lommel	(Belgium) Lucas Coenen	(France) Romain Febvre	(Belgium) Lucas Coenen	(Belgium) Lucas Coenen	
16	17 August	MXGP of Sweden	Uddevalla	(France) Romain Febvre	(France) Romain Febvre	(France) Romain Febvre	(France) Romain Febvre	
17	24 August	MXGP of The Netherlands	Arnhem	(Netherlands) Jeffrey Herlings	(Netherlands) Jeffrey Herlings	(Netherlands) Jeffrey Herlings	(Netherlands) Jeffrey Herlings	
18	7 September	MXGP of Turkey	Afyonkarahisar	(Belgium) Lucas Coenen	(Belgium) Lucas Coenen	(Netherlands) Jeffrey Herlings	(Netherlands) Jeffrey Herlings	
19	14 September	MXGP of China	Shanghai	(Netherlands) Jeffrey Herlings	(Netherlands) Jeffrey Herlings	(Netherlands) Jeffrey Herlings	(Netherlands) Jeffrey Herlings	
20	21 September	MXGP of Australia	Darwin	(Belgium) Lucas Coenen	(Belgium) Lucas Coenen	Race Cancelled	(Belgium) Lucas Coenen	

=== MX2 ===
Round	Date	Grand Prix	Location	Pole position	Race 1 Winner	Race 2 Winner	Round Winner	Report
1	2 March	MXGP of Argentina	Córdoba	(Italy) Andrea Adamo	(Netherlands) Kay de Wolf	(Belgium) Sacha Coenen	(Netherlands) Kay de Wolf	
2	16 March	MXGP of Castilla–La Mancha	Cózar	(France) Thibault Benistant	(Italy) Ferruccio Zanchi	(Belgium) Liam Everts	(Belgium) Liam Everts	
3	23 March	MXGP of Europe	Saint-Jean-d'Angély	(France) Thibault Benistant	(Germany) Simon Längenfelder	(Italy) Andrea Adamo	(Italy) Andrea Adamo	
4	6 April	(Sardinia) MXGP of Sardegna	Riola Sardo	(Germany) Simon Längenfelder	(Netherlands) Kay de Wolf	(Netherlands) Kay de Wolf	(Netherlands) Kay de Wolf	
5	13 April	MXGP of Trentino	Pietramurata	(Belgium) Liam Everts	(South Africa) Camden McLellan	(France) Thibault Benistant	(Italy) Andrea Adamo	
6	19 & 21 April	MXGP of Switzerland	Frauenfeld	(Netherlands) Kay de Wolf	(Germany) Simon Längenfelder	(Germany) Simon Längenfelder	(Germany) Simon Längenfelder	
7	4 May	MXGP of Portugal	Águeda	(Italy) Andrea Adamo	(Italy) Andrea Adamo	(Italy) Andrea Adamo	(Italy) Andrea Adamo	
8	11 May	MXGP of Spain	Lugo	(France) Thibault Benistant	(Netherlands) Kay de Wolf	(Italy) Andrea Adamo	(Netherlands) Kay de Wolf	
9	25 May	MXGP of France	Ernée	(Italy) Andrea Adamo	(Germany) Simon Längenfelder	(Germany) Simon Längenfelder	(Germany) Simon Längenfelder	
10	1 June	MXGP of Germany	Teutschenthal	(Italy) Valerio Lata	(Italy) Andrea Adamo	(Spain) Guillem Farrés	(Italy) Andrea Adamo	
11	8 June	MXGP of Latvia	Ķegums	(Germany) Simon Längenfelder	(Belgium) Sacha Coenen	(Netherlands) Kay de Wolf	(Belgium) Sacha Coenen	
12	22 June	(United Kingdom) MXGP of Great Britain	Matterley Basin	(Germany) Simon Längenfelder	(Germany) Simon Längenfelder	(Germany) Simon Längenfelder	(Germany) Simon Längenfelder	
13	13 July	MXGP of Finland	Iitti - Kymi Ring	(Netherlands) Kay de Wolf	(Netherlands) Kay de Wolf	(Netherlands) Kay de Wolf	(Netherlands) Kay de Wolf	
14	27 July	MXGP of Czech Republic	Loket	(France) Mathis Valin	(Germany) Simon Längenfelder	(Italy) Andrea Adamo	(Germany) Simon Längenfelder	
15	3 August	MXGP of Flanders	Lommel	(Netherlands) Kay de Wolf	(Netherlands) Kay de Wolf	(Netherlands) Kay de Wolf	(Netherlands) Kay de Wolf	
16	17 August	MXGP of Sweden	Uddevalla	(France) Thibault Benistant	(Italy) Andrea Adamo	(Germany) Simon Längenfelder	(Germany) Simon Längenfelder	
17	24 August	MXGP of The Netherlands	Arnhem	(Italy) Andrea Adamo	(Netherlands) Kay de Wolf	(Netherlands) Kay de Wolf	(Netherlands) Kay de Wolf	
18	7 September	MXGP of Turkey	Afyonkarahisar	(Belgium) Sacha Coenen	(Belgium) Sacha Coenen	(Germany) Simon Längenfelder	(Germany) Simon Längenfelder	
19	14 September	MXGP of China	Shanghai	(Belgium) Sacha Coenen	(Belgium) Sacha Coenen	(Italy) Andrea Adamo	(Belgium) Sacha Coenen	
20	21 September	MXGP of Australia	Darwin	(Netherlands) Kay de Wolf	(Netherlands) Kay de Wolf	(Belgium) Sacha Coenen	(Netherlands) Kay de Wolf	

=== Grand Prix locations ===
Location of non-European Grands Prix in 2025.
Location of European Grands Prix in 2025.

== MXGP ==
=== Entry list ===
Officially Approved Teams & Riders
Team	Constructor	No	Rider	Rounds
Kawasaki Racing Team MXGP	Kawasaki	3	(France) Romain Febvre	All
Kawasaki Racing Team MXGP	Kawasaki	41	(Latvia) Pauls Jonass	1–4, 7–10, 16–20
Monster Energy Yamaha Factory MXGP Team	Yamaha	10	(Netherlands) Calvin Vlaanderen	All
Monster Energy Yamaha Factory MXGP Team	Yamaha	93	(Belgium) Jago Geerts	1–15, 17–20
Monster Energy Yamaha Factory MXGP Team	Yamaha	959	(France) Maxime Renaux	1–12, 14–20
JWR Honda Racing	Honda	17	(Norway) Cornelius Tøndel	1–5, 9–11, 14
JWR Honda Racing	Honda	107	(Netherlands) Lars van Berkel	15, 17
JWR Honda Racing	Honda	397	(Italy) Yuri Pasqualini	16
Team Honda Motoblouz SR Motul	Honda	24	(Norway) Kevin Horgmo	1–9, 12–13
Team Honda Motoblouz SR Motul	Honda	303	(Italy) Alberto Forato	1, 3, 9–13
Team Honda Motoblouz SR Motul	Honda	319	(France) Quentin-Marc Prugnières	14–20
JM Honda Racing	Honda	32	(Belgium) Brent Van Doninck	5, 7–18
Honda HRC	Honda	70	(Spain) Rubén Fernández	All
Honda HRC	Honda	243	(Slovenia) Tim Gajser	1–6, 16–20
Red Bull KTM Factory Racing	KTM	84	(Netherlands) Jeffrey Herlings	4–12, 15–20
Red Bull KTM Factory Racing	KTM	96	(Belgium) Lucas Coenen	All
MX-Handel Husqvarna Racing	Husqvarna	87	(Switzerland) Kevin Brumann	1–8, 14–20
Aruba.it Ducati Factory MX Team	Ducati	91	(Switzerland) Jeremy Seewer	All
Aruba.it Ducati Factory MX Team	Ducati	101	(Italy) Mattia Guadagnini	1–3, 7–11, 13–20
Aruba.it Ducati Factory MX Team	Ducati	177	(Italy) Alessandro Lupino	6
Aruba.it Ducati Factory MX Team	Ducati	222	(Italy) Antonio Cairoli	5, 12
Fantic Factory Racing MXGP	Fantic	132	(Italy) Andrea Bonacorsi	All
Fantic Factory Racing MXGP	Fantic	189	(Netherlands) Brian Bogers	1–4, 6–20
Fantic Factory Racing MXGP	Fantic	259	(Netherlands) Glenn Coldenhoff	All
Team Leoparden Racing	Honda	180	(Sweden) Leopold Ambjörnsson	14
MRT Racing Team Beta	Beta	226	(Germany) Tom Koch	All
MRT Racing Team Beta	Beta	919	(United Kingdom) Ben Watson	All
TEM JP253 KTM Racing Team	KTM	253	(Slovenia) Jan Pancar	All
SixtySeven Racing Team	Husqvarna	505	(Sweden) Arvid Lüning	2–6, 10
SixtySeven Racing Team	Husqvarna	991	(Germany) Mark Scheu	1–6, 9
JK Racing Yamaha	Yamaha	517	(Sweden) Isak Gifting	1–5, 9–12, 14–20
Wild Card Teams & Riders
Team	Constructor	No	Rider	Rounds
Yamaha Motor Switzerland	Yamaha	4	(Switzerland) Arnaud Tonus	6
Raceline Husqvarna TDub Racing Team	Husqvarna	7	(Australia) Todd Waters	20
Team TMX Competition	KTM	11	(France) Calvin Fonvieille	9
737 Performance KTM / D’stock 41	KTM	12	(France) Mathys Boisramé	9
EastMX	Gas Gas	29	(Finland) Pekka Nissinen	13
Cat Moto Bauerschmidt Husqvarna	Husqvarna	31	(Switzerland) Loris Freidig	6, 9
Caloundra Motorcycle Centre	Yamaha	34	(Australia) Levi Rogers	19–20
KTM Kosak Team	KTM	39	(Netherlands) Roan van de Moosdijk	2–8, 10–12, 14–17
Loukko Tampere/KTM Suomi	KTM	40	(Finland) Kasper Kangasniemi	13
Luke's Racing Team - Hertrampf Gruppe	Honda	43	(Australia) Mitchell Evans	5–6
Osička MX Team	KTM	45	(Slovakia) Tomáš Kohút	5, 10
Osička MX Team	KTM	411	(Austria) Marcel Stauffer	5–6, 9–10
Rising Motorsports Racing Team	Triumph	48	(Australia) Zac Watson	19–20
Tech 32 Racing MX	Triumph	49	(France) Tom Guyon	3, 9
Husqvarna Scandinavia	Husqvarna	52	(Sweden) Albin Gerhardsson	16
Team VHR Racing	Yamaha	53	(France) Romain Pape	3, 6
Team UFO Speed	KTM	55	(Argentina) David Sona	1
Team UFO Speed	Yamaha	751	(Argentina) Daniel Garay	1
Motos VR Yamaha	Yamaha	56	(Portugal) Luís Outeiro	7
KMP Honda Racing Team by DVAG	Honda	57	(Latvia) Edvards Bidzāns	5, 11
KMP Honda Racing Team by DVAG	Honda	196	(Spain) Víctor Alonso	5, 7, 9–10, 14
KMP Honda Racing Team by DVAG	Honda	224	(Czech Republic) Jakub Terešák	5, 10, 14
Team Carranza Sport	KTM	58	(Argentina) Nicolás Carranza	1
SS100 Motosport	Husqvarna	59	(Turkey) Şakir Şenkalaycı	18
	Yamaha	61	(China) Wu Riga	19
Peak Spirit Racing	Triumph	65	(Switzerland) Robin Scheiben	6
VisuAlz Production / Weber Werke	Husqvarna	66	(Germany) Tim Koch	10
Becker Racing	KTM	71	(Germany) Maximilian Spies	4, 10–11, 15–17
Becker Racing	KTM	103	(Czech Republic) Václav Kovář	10
Honda Motos Chile	Honda	76	(Chile) Sergio Villaronga	1
Winner Triumph Racing Australia	Triumph	79	(Australia) Connar Adams	20
Lorenzo Racing Team	Honda	81	(Argentina) Fermín Ciccimarra	1
Maneco MX	Yamaha	85	(Argentina) Agustín Carrasco	1
Sturm STC Racing Team	Yamaha	90	(Germany) Justin Trache	5, 10, 17
Kehrli Motos	Yamaha	92	(Switzerland) Valentin Guillod	1–6
RS-Shop KTM Chile	KTM	100	(Chile) Matías Pavez	1
Team Honda Pighetti Racing	Honda	107	(Netherlands) Lars van Berkel	1
RPM Cross	Honda	108	(Argentina) Jeremías Durbano	1
Extreme Motorsport	Yamaha	109	(Czech Republic) Rudolf Plch	14
	Husqvarna	113	(Argentina) Emiliano Castillo	1
GCC Swiss Racing Team	Husqvarna	119	(Switzerland) Nicolas Bender	6
FM CAMI Racing Team	Honda	123	(Italy) Federico Tuani	5–6, 9–10
FM CAMI Racing Team	Honda	337	(Italy) Yuri Quarti	5
SHR Motorsports	Yamaha	125	(Finland) Emil Weckman	10
Scoccia Racing Team Kawasaki	Kawasaki	128	(Italy) Ivo Monticelli	5
Bauerschmidt Husqvarna	Husqvarna	131	(Germany) Cato Nickel	2–3, 5–6, 10, 12, 14, 16–17
	KTM	138	(Denmark) William Kleemann	16
Silve Racing	KTM	142	(Finland) Jere Haavisto	11
	KTM	146	(Australia) Hugh McKay	20
SFC Racing	Yamaha	149	(Australia) Cody O'Loan	20
Castrol – Axion Sport MX Team	Husqvarna	151	(Argentina) Tomás Montes Gadda	1
Castrol – Axion Sport MX Team	Husqvarna	833	(Argentina) Lautaro Toro	1
Cowboy Team	KTM	155	(Argentina) Nicolás Mana	1
FF Racing Team	Triumph	161	(Sweden) Alvin Östlund	16
Pedica Racing Team	Honda	174	(Italy) Alessandro Valeri	14
KTM Switzerland	KTM	178	(Switzerland) Ramon Keller	6
Kawasaki Racing Team	Kawasaki	179	(Argentina) Joaquín Poli	1
	Honda	184	(Argentina) Jorge Leonardo Ochoa	1
Amsil Racing FZ Motorsport KTM	KTM	200	(Italy) Filippo Zonta	5
SMR Racing Team	KTM	211	(Spain) Lucas Bodega	2, 8
Lexa MX Racing Team	Honda	212	(United Kingdom) John Adamson	2, 4–10, 12, 17
Lexa MX Racing Team	Honda	326	(United Kingdom) Josh Gilbert	2–10, 17
	Honda	213	(Hong Kong) Ng Ka Lun	19
	Yamaha	217	(Netherlands) Teun Cooymans	17
Weilenmann Motos Racing Team	KTM	218	(Liechtenstein) Fabian Weilenmann	6
FRT Motorsport	Kawasaki	221	(Italy) Nicholas Lapucci	5
AGMX Racing	Honda	237	(Switzerland) Xylian Ramella	6
Yamaha Monster Energy Geração	Yamaha	238	(Brazil) Fábio Santos	1
Hoenson Racing	KTM	241	(Netherlands) Michel Hoenson	15, 17
Team RX Moto	KTM	248	(Finland) Miro Varjonen	13
SAS TPC KTM	KTM	249	(France) Mathéo Miot	12
JMT EstTrans Yamaha Keskus Racing Team	Yamaha	261	(Estonia) Jörgen-Matthias Talviku	11, 15, 17
MX Express Racing Team	Yamaha	281	(Australia) Cooper Holroyd	20
Ausió Yamaha Racing Team	Yamaha	292	(Spain) Ander Valentín	2, 8
Motostar Racing	Yamaha	297	(Sweden) Anton Gole	16
KTM Sarholz Racing Team	KTM	300	(Germany) Noah Ludwig	3, 5–6, 9–11, 14
KTM Sarholz Racing Team	KTM	470	(Germany) Peter König	10, 17
	Gas Gas	302	(Turkey) Yiğit Ali Selek	18
Caparvi Racing Team	Yamaha	311	(Italy) Mirko Dal Bosco	5
Caparvi Racing Team	Yamaha	921	(Italy) Matteo Giarrizzo	5
KL Racing Team	KTM	365	(Denmark) Nikolaj Skovgaard	5–6
Alpine Motorcycles	Yamaha	379	(Australia) Jacob Sweet	20
SC Sporthomes Husqvarna	Husqvarna	421	(South Africa) Tristan Purdon	12
YRC/Yamaha Motor Scandinavia	Yamaha	427	(Norway) Håkon Fredriksen	15–16
WPM Motors	KTM	464	(Netherlands) Dave Kooiker	17
JLB Racing Team	Triumph	474	(Belgium) Bryan Boulard	10, 14
Crendon Tru7 Honda Racing	Honda	484	(United Kingdom) Jamie Carpenter	12
Team MX Academy	Honda	491	(Germany) Paul Haberland	6
AK MDR Motocross Team	Gas Gas	499	(Italy) Emanuele Alberio	5, 10, 14
	KTM	521	(Netherlands) Boris Blanken	15, 17
Zauner Racing	KTM	531	(Austria) Florian Hellrigl	14
	Yamaha	599	(China) Li Yuzhang	19
Motosports Racing Team	Husqvarna	610	(Latvia) Mairis Pumpurs	11, 13
Triumph AQVA Racing	Triumph	651	(Estonia) Meico Vettik	11
Magmum MX Team	Gas Gas	684	(Latvia) Uldis Freibergs	11, 16
Venemotos Racing Team	Yamaha	722	(Venezuela) Carlos Badiali	1
WBM Team	KTM	761	(Bulgaria) Julian Georgiev	18
Buitenhuis Racing	Yamaha	771	(Netherlands) Kevin Buitenhuis	17
Chambers KTM Racing	KTM	811	(United Kingdom) Adam Sterry	2–17
2B Moto	Beta	817	(France) Jason Clermont	9
	Yamaha	822	(Netherlands) Mike Bolink	14
Andre Motors	Husqvarna	826	(Netherlands) Nick Leerkes	15, 17
Laurense Motors Kawasaki Racing Team	Kawasaki	841	(Netherlands) Robert Fobbe	17
Mezher Motors	KTM	901	(Costa Rica) Fabricio Chacón	1
Factory Bike Mundo	Yamaha	909	(Ecuador) Miguel Cordovez	1
	Gas Gas	951	(France) Arnaud Aubin	9
Avant Motos Honda Racing	Honda	952	(Argentina) José Felipe	1
	Yamaha	971	(France) Tino Basso	3

==== Riders Championship ====
Points are awarded to the top-ten finishers of the qualifying race, in the following format:

Position	1st	2nd	3rd	4th	5th	6th	7th	8th	9th	10th
Points	10	9	8	7	6	5	4	3	2	1

Points are awarded to finishers of the main races, in the following format:

Position	1st	2nd	3rd	4th	5th	6th	7th	8th	9th	10th	11th	12th	13th	14th	15th	16th	17th	18th	19th	20th
Points	25	22	20	18	16	15	14	13	12	11	10	9	8	7	6	5	4	3	2	1

Pos	Nr	Rider	Bike	ARG (Argentina)		CAS		EUR (Europe)		SAR (Sardinia)		TRE		SUI (Switzerland)		POR (Portugal)		ESP (Spain)		FRA (France)		GER (Germany)		LAT (Latvia)		GBR (United Kingdom)		FIN (Finland)		CZE (Czech Republic)		FLA (Flanders)		SWE (Sweden)		NED (Netherlands)		TUR (Turkey)		CHN (China)		AUS (Australia)		Points
1	3	(France) Romain Febvre	Kawasaki	1^{+9}	2	7^{+2}	5	2^{+6}	2	4	1	2^{+10}	2	6^{+6}	2	2^{+8}	2	1^{+9}	2	2^{+8}	1	4^{+8}	3	6^{+8}	3	3^{+9}	1	5^{+5}	2	5^{+10}	1	1^{+9}	2	1^{+10}	1	3^{+8}	8	3^{+8}	2	4^{+8}	4	4^{+9}	C	956
2	96	(Belgium) Lucas Coenen	KTM	7	8	9^{+5}	8	3^{+10}	3	1^{+9}	Ret	3	6	1^{+1}	1	1^{+10}	1	4^{+7}	1	1^{+10}	2	1^{+10}	2	2^{+9}	2	2^{+6}	3	1^{+10}	1	1^{+9}	2	2^{+10}	1	7^{+5}	12	2^{+7}	2	1^{+10}	3	9^{+4}	14	1^{+10}	C	917
3	259	(Netherlands) Glenn Coldenhoff	Fantic	5^{+5}	7	4^{+6}	3	11	4	2^{+7}	3	5^{+4}	3	10^{+2}	6	8^{+3}	6	5^{+2}	12	10^{+2}	9	16	6	3^{+6}	7	1^{+8}	5	2	5	4^{+7}	3	5^{+6}	4	6^{+7}	5	4^{+9}	4	12	9	7^{+1}	9	8	C	678
4	70	(Spain) Rubén Fernández	Honda	9^{+1}	13	2^{+1}	12	5^{+8}	Ret	6^{+8}	11	7^{+6}	4	3^{+10}	DSQ	3^{+5}	3	3	4	11^{+7}	7	Ret^{+6}	DNS	4^{+7}	6	5^{+7}	2	6^{+7}	19	2^{+8}	7	14	12	4^{+4}	8	15^{+3}	9	5^{+2}	5	5^{+6}	3	5^{+5}	C	620
5	84	(Netherlands) Jeffrey Herlings	KTM							20	7	10	11	14^{+4}	4	10^{+4}	7	7^{+3}	6	3^{+1}	5	2^{+9}	1	1^{+10}	1	4^{+10}	4					8^{+2}	8	2^{+9}	2	1^{+10}	1	2^{+9}	1	1^{+10}	1	2^{+4}	C	608
6	10	(Netherlands) Calvin Vlaanderen	Yamaha	19^{+3}	11	3^{+4}	22	8^{+5}	Ret	Ret^{+4}	4	8^{+5}	16	9	9	12^{+9}	4	8^{+6}	3	7	8	3^{+3}	10	11	9	6^{+5}	6	4^{+9}	3	11	5	3^{+8}	5	3^{+6}	4	12	13	7^{+3}	7	10^{+5}	5	6^{+7}	C	582
7	959	(France) Maxime Renaux	Yamaha	2^{+10}	1	10^{+9}	11	10^{+7}	5	17	DNS	4^{+7}	7	5^{+8}	29	5^{+1}	9	2^{+8}	9	4^{+6}	15	6^{+4}	4	13	8	DNS	DNS			6^{+6}	Ret	10	13	5	3	7	11	6^{+6}	6	3^{+7}	6	Ret^{+2}	C	527
8	132	(Italy) Andrea Bonacorsi	Fantic	11	10	8	2	Ret	14	3^{+5}	5	16^{+1}	9	4^{+7}	5	6	5	6	7	6	6	9	DNS	7^{+5}	5	12	18	3^{+8}	8	Ret^{+5}	9	9^{+3}	3	9	14	5^{+5}	5	13	10	8^{+2}	8	11	C	518
9	243	(Slovenia) Tim Gajser	Honda	3^{+8}	3	1^{+10}	1	1^{+9}	1	5^{+10}	2	1^{+9}	1	2^{+9}	Ret																			Ret^{+8}	7	6^{+6}	3	4^{+7}	4	2^{+9}	2	3^{+6}	C	490
10	91	(Switzerland) Jeremy Seewer	Ducati	6^{+7}	18	14	14	13	10	15	9	6^{+8}	22	7^{+5}	3	15^{+2}	11	19^{+5}	5	5^{+4}	3	5^{+2}	14	16^{+1}	18	13^{+1}	9	11^{+1}	10	8^{+3}	6	21	17	Ret	11	18	19	14	16	11	Ret	12	C	377
11	253	(Slovenia) Jan Pancar	KTM	13	14	18	17	16^{+2}	13	16	19	9^{+2}	8	12	10	11	13	18^{+1}	Ret	8^{+5}	14	11^{+7}	8	Ret	20	11^{+3}	11	20	13	3	16	16	6	8^{+3}	6	Ret	DNS	9^{+1}	12	16	11	14	C	321
12	93	(Belgium) Jago Geerts	Yamaha	8	12	17	Ret	19	Ret	11^{+2}	10	15	10	13	11	13	12	15^{+10}	15	20	10	13	12	9	4	Ret	DNS	15^{+6}	6	9^{+1}	8	Ret^{+5}	DNS			17	7	11	14	15	7	Ret^{+3}	C	300
13	189	(Netherlands) Brian Bogers	Fantic	14	17	11^{+7}	4	12	Ret	18	18			Ret	Ret	18	Ret	13	13	13	12	8	5	5^{+4}	13	8^{+2}	17	8	9	10	10	12	Ret	11	18	8^{+4}	6	20	17	14	15	13	C	300
14	919	(United Kingdom) Ben Watson	Beta	16	15	15	13	14	12	8^{+1}	12	12^{+3}	12	18	7	14	18	12	11	9	11	21	13	8^{+2}	10	18	14	12^{+2}	11	12	12	11	10	21	Ret	10	18	19	13	20	13	Ret	C	290
15	41	(Latvia) Pauls Jonass	Kawasaki	10^{+2}	9	16^{+8}	6	6^{+3}	6	DNS	DNS					4	8	11^{+4}	10	14	13	35^{+5}	DNS											15^{+2}	10	11^{+2}	10	8^{+5}	8	6^{+3}	12	10^{+1}	C	274
16	517	(Sweden) Isak Gifting	Yamaha	12	Ret	6	7	23^{+4}	9	12	6	DNS	DNS							12^{+3}	4	7^{+1}	7	19	11	Ret	DNS			7^{+2}	4	4^{+7}	9	17^{+1}	23	Ret	20	15^{+4}	15	12	Ret	9	C	263
17	101	(Italy) Mattia Guadagnini	Ducati	4^{+4}	4	21	9	4	7							9	10	10	18	19	Ret	18	Ret	14	12			13	12	17	11	20	Ret	10	22	16	17	10	20	13	10	7^{+8}	C	247
18	24	(Norway) Kevin Horgmo	Honda	17^{+6}	6	5^{+3}	10	9^{+1}	8	7^{+6}	8	14	5	8	8	7	Ret	16	8	Ret^{+9}	DNS					14^{+4}	7	10	18															243
19	32	(Belgium) Brent Van Doninck	Honda									DNS	DNS			20	16	9	17	Ret	18	10	17	12^{+3}	15	10	16	9^{+3}	4	DSQ^{+4}	13	7^{+4}	11	20	9	14^{+1}	12	17	11					191
20	39	(Netherlands) Roan van de Moosdijk	KTM			13	23	Ret	15	9^{+3}	14	17	Ret	24	12	16^{+6}	21	17	14			12	18	10	16	15	13			14	18	15	14	12	13	13	14							168
21	226	(Germany) Tom Koch	Beta	18	19	23	16	25	17	Ret	20	19	14	21	Ret	Ret	15	21	16	25	25	14	20	Ret	26	16	12	16	14	15	17	19	16	Ret	DNS	19	25	16	18	18	17	16	C	108
22	811	(United Kingdom) Adam Sterry	KTM			22	18	17	18	13	16	18	18	17	16	21	19	14	19	15	24	27	Ret	Ret	19	17	15	14^{+4}	16	13	14	25	20	Ret	16	24	21							104
23	87	(Switzerland) Kevin Brumann	Husqvarna	21	20	12	19	18	Ret	19	17	Ret	17	20	15	17^{+7}	14	DNS	DNS											20	19	13	Ret	16	Ret	9	Ret	Ret	DNS	17	16	15	C	93
24	92	(Switzerland) Valentin Guillod	Yamaha	Ret	5	DNS	DNS	7	11	10	13	Ret	DNS	11^{+3}	Ret																													72
25	303	(Italy) Alberto Forato	Honda	20	Ret			20	Ret											22	22	19	11	18	17	9	10	7	7															72
26	71	(Germany) Maximilian Spies	KTM							14	15											17	15	15	14							18	DSQ	18	21	Ret	16							47
27	319	(France) Quentin Prugnières	Honda																											16	15	23	15	13	15	DNS	DNS	18	19	19	19	17	C	44
28	427	(Norway) Håkon Fredriksen	Yamaha																													6^{+1}	7	14	17									41
29	411	(Austria) Marcel Stauffer	KTM									11	13	16	Ret					17	16	15	Ret																					38
30	222	(Italy) Tony Cairoli	Ducati									13	19													7	8																	37
31	326	(United Kingdom) Josh Gilbert	Honda			19	15	Ret	Ret	21	21	20	Ret	Ret	17	19	17	20	20	Ret	23	20	16													Ret	23							27
32	300	(Germany) Noah Ludwig	KTM					15	16			21	Ret	22	13					21	26	22	23	21	22					19	20													22
33	17	(Norway) Cornelius Tøndel	Honda	15	Ret	Ret	20	Ret	DNS	Ret	Ret	DNS	DNS							23	20	Ret	9	24	Ret					DNS	DNS													20
34	261	(Estonia) Jörgen-Matthias Talviku	Yamaha																					17	21							17	19			20	15							17
35	610	(Latvia) Mairis Pumpurs	Husqvarna																					23	23			17	15															10
36	177	(Italy) Alessandro Lupino	Ducati											19	14																													9
37	12	(France) Mathys Boisramé	KTM																	16	17																							9
38	4	(Switzerland) Arnaud Tonus	Yamaha											15	19																													8
39	29	(Finland) Pekka Nissinen	Gas Gas																									18	17															7
40	128	(Italy) Ivo Monticelli	Kawasaki									Ret	15																															6
41	131	(Germany) Cato Nickel	Husqvarna			24	Ret	22	20			28	27	23	18							23	21			19	21			Ret	DNS			23	24	25	Ret							6
42	49	(France) Tom Guyon	Triumph					24	Ret											18	19																							5
43	238	(Brazil) Fábio Santos	Yamaha	22	16																																							5
44	48	(Australia) Zac Watson	Triumph																																					Ret	18	20	C	4
45	52	(Sweden) Albin Gerhardsson	Husqvarna																															19	19									4
46	224	(Czech Republic) Jakub Terešák	Honda									Ret	23									Ret	DNS							18	21													3
47	7	(Australia) Todd Waters	Husqvarna																																							18	C	3
48	521	(Netherlands) Boris Blanken	KTM																													22	18			22	24							3
49	212	(United Kingdom) John Adamson	Honda			DNS	DNS			23	24	25	Ret	30	23	Ret	20	22	DNS	27	Ret	29	Ret			Ret	19									Ret	DNS							3
50	53	(France) Romain Pape	Yamaha					21	19					27	20																													3
51	196	(Spain) Víctor Alonso	Honda									30	26			DNS	DNS			26	21	25	19							DNS	DNS													2
52	40	(Finland) Kasper Kangasniemi	KTM																									19	Ret															2
53	34	(Australia) Levi Rogers	Yamaha																																					Ret	Ret	19	C	2
54	484	(United Kingdom) Jamie Carpenter	Honda																							20	20																	2
55	248	(Finland) Miro Varjonen	KTM																									Ret	20															1
56	43	(Australia) Mitchell Evans	Honda									26	20	Ret	Ret																													1
57	991	(Germany) Mark Scheu	Husqvarna	25	21	20	21	26	21	Ret	23	27	30	25	21					29	28																							1
58	599	(China) Li Yuzhang	Yamaha																																					21	20			1
59	161	(Sweden) Alvin Östlund	Triumph																															Ret	20									1
60	142	(Finland) Jere Haavisto	KTM																					20	25																			1
	107	(Netherlands) Lars van Berkel	Honda	24	31																											24	21			21	22							0
	761	(Bulgaria) Julian Georgiev	KTM																																			21	21					0
	249	(France) Mathéo Miot	KTM																							21	22																	0
	61	(China) Wu Riga	Yamaha																																					22	21			0
	221	(Italy) Nicholas Lapucci	Kawasaki									23	21																															0
	499	(Italy) Emanuele Alberio	Gas Gas									24	28									32	25							21	25													0
	292	(Spain) Ander Valentín	Yamaha			27	26											24	21																									0
	379	(Australia) Jacob Sweet	Yamaha																																							21	C	0
	505	(Sweden) Arvid Lüning	Husqvarna			26	24	Ret	22	22	22	Ret	31	32	25							DNS	DNS																					0
	302	(Turkey) Yiğit Ali Selek	Gas Gas																																			22	22					0
	211	(Spain) Lucas Bodega	KTM			25	25											23	22																									0
	470	(Germany) Peter König	KTM																			28	22													23	26							0
	179	(Argentina) Joaquín Poli	Kawasaki	23	22																																							0
	109	(Czech Republic) Rudolf Plch	Yamaha																											22	23													0
	123	(Italy) Federico Tuani	Honda									DNQ	DNQ	28	22					24	27	24	Ret																					0
	57	(Latvia) Edvards Bidzāns	Honda									Ret	25											22	24																			0
	684	(Latvia) Uldis Freibergs	Gas Gas																					25	27									22	25									0
	826	(Netherlands) Nick Leerkes	Husqvarna																													26	22			26	27							0
	45	(Slovakia) Tomáš Kohút	KTM									22	29									26	Ret																					0
	180	(Sweden) Leopold Ambjörnson	Honda																											26	22													0
	149	(Australia) Cody O'Loan	Yamaha																																							22	C	0
	722	(Venezuela) Carlos Badiali	Yamaha	26	23																																							0
	174	(Italy) Alessandro Valeri	Honda																											23	26													0
	241	(Netherlands) Michel Hoenson	KTM																													27	23			29	33							0
	281	(Australia) Cooper Holroyd	Yamaha																																							23	C	0
	474	(Belgium) Bryan Boulard	Triumph																			34	27							24	24													0
	397	(Italy) Yuri Pasqualini	Honda																															24	26									0
	100	(Chile) Matías Pavez	KTM	27	24																																							0
	200	(Italy) Filippo Zonta	KTM									29	24																															0
	31	(Switzerland) Loris Freidig	Husqvarna											33	24					30	30																							0
	66	(Germany) Tim Koch	Husqvarna																			31	24																					0
	79	(Australia) Connar Adams	Triumph																																							24	C	0
	531	(Austria) Florian Hellrigl	KTM																											25	27													0
	952	(Argentina) José Felipe	Honda	Ret	25																																							0
	833	(Argentina) Lautaro Toro	Husqvarna	28	26																																							0
	125	(Finland) Emil Weckman	Yamaha																			30	26																					0
	119	(Switzerland) Nicolas Bender	Husqvarna											31	26																													0
	491	(Germany) Paul Haberland	Honda											26	Ret																													0
	81	(Argentina) Fermín Ciccimarra	Honda	29	27																																							0
	217	(Netherlands) Teun Cooymans	Yamaha																																	27	31							0
	365	(Denmark) Nikolaj Skovgaard	KTM									DNQ	DNQ	35	27																													0
	11	(France) Calvin Fonvieille	KTM																	28	29																							0
	771	(Netherlands) Kevin Buitenhuis	Yamaha																																	28	29							0
	85	(Argentina) Agustín Carrasco	Yamaha	31	28																																							0
	103	(Czech Republic) Václav Kovář	Gas Gas																			33	28																					0
	65	(Switzerland) Robin Scheiben	Triumph											34	28																													0
	464	(Netherlands) Dave Kooiker	KTM																																	Ret	28							0
	178	(Switzerland) Ramon Keller	KTM											29	30																													0
	58	(Argentina) Nicolás Carranza	KTM	32	29																																							0
	151	(Argentina) Tomás Montes Gadda	Husqvarna	34	30																																							0
	90	(Germany) Justin Trache	Yamaha									DNQ	DNQ									36	Ret													Ret	30							0
	76	(Chile) Sergio Villaronga	Honda	30	Ret																																							0
	817	(France) Jason Clermont	Beta																	31	31																							0
	921	(Italy) Matteo Giarrizzo	Yamaha									31	Ret																															0
	155	(Argentina) Nicolás Mana	KTM	33	32																																							0
	841	(Netherlands) Robert Fobbe	Kawasaki																																	Ret	32							0
	113	(Argentina) Emiliano Castillo	Husqvarna	35	Ret																																							0
	951	(France) Arnaud Aubin	Gas Gas																	Ret	Ret																							0
	901	(Costa Rica) Fabricio Chacón	KTM	Ret	DNS																																							0
	909	(Ecuador) Miguel Cordovez	Yamaha	Ret	DNS																																							0
	218	(Liechtenstein) Fabian Weilenmann	KTM											Ret	DNS																													0
	421	(South Africa) Tristan Purdon	Husqvarna																							Ret	DNS																	0
	822	(Netherlands) Mike Bolink	Yamaha																											Ret	DNS													0
	146	(Australia) Hugh McKay	Yamaha																																							Ret	C	0
	108	(Argentina) Jeremías Durbano	Honda	DNS	DNS																																							0
	971	(France) Tino Basso	Yamaha					DNS	DNS																																			0
	237	(Switzerland) Xylian Ramella	Honda											DNS	DNS																													0
	56	(Portugal) Luís Outeiro	Yamaha													DNS	DNS																											0
	651	(Estonia) Meico Vettik	Triumph																					DNS	DNS																			0
	297	(Sweden) Anton Gole	Yamaha																															DNS	DNS									0
	138	(Denmark) William Kleemann	KTM																															DNS	DNS									0
	59	(Turkey) Şakir Şenkalaycı	Husqvarna																																			DNS	DNS					0
	213	(Hong Kong) Ng Ka Lun	Honda																																					DNS	DNS			0
	184	(Argentina) Jorge Leonardo Ochoa	Yamaha	DNQ	DNQ																																							0
	751	(Argentina) Daniel Garay	Yamaha	DNQ	DNQ																																							0
	55	(Argentina) David Sona	KTM	DNQ	DNQ																																							0
	337	(Italy) Yuri Quarti	Honda									DNQ	DNQ																															0
	311	(Italy) Mirko Dal Bosco	Yamaha									DNQ	DNQ																															0
Pos	Nr	Rider	Bike	ARG (Argentina)		CAS		EUR (Europe)		SAR (Sardinia)		TRE		SUI (Switzerland)		POR (Portugal)		ESP (Spain)		FRA (France)		GER (Germany)		LAT (Latvia)		GBR (United Kingdom)		FIN (Finland)		CZE (Czech Republic)		FLA (Flanders)		SWE (Sweden)		NED (Netherlands)		TUR (Turkey)		CHN (China)		AUS (Australia)		Points

==== Manufacturers Championship ====
Pos	Bike	ARG (Argentina)		CAS		EUR (Europe)		SAR (Sardinia)		TRE		SUI (Switzerland)		POR (Portugal)		ESP (Spain)		FRA (France)		GER (Germany)		LAT (Latvia)		GBR (United Kingdom)		FIN (Finland)		CZE (Czech Republic)		FLA (Flanders)		SWE (Sweden)		NED (Netherlands)		TUR (Turkey)		CHN (China)		AUS (Australia)		Points
1	KTM	7	8	9^{+5}	8	3^{+10}	3	1^{+9}	7	3^{+2}	6	1^{+4}	1	1^{+10}	1	4^{+7}	1	1^{+10}	2	1^{+10}	1	1^{+10}	1	2^{+10}	3	1^{+10}	1	1^{+9}	2	2^{+10}	1	2^{+9}	2	1^{+10}	1	1^{+10}	1	1^{+10}	1	1^{+10}	C	1026
2	Kawasaki	1^{+9}	2	7^{+8}	5	2^{+6}	2	4	1	2^{+10}	2	6^{+6}	2	2^{+8}	2	1^{+9}	2	2^{+8}	1	4^{+8}	3	6^{+8}	3	3^{+9}	1	5^{+5}	2	5^{+10}	1	1^{+9}	2	1^{+10}	1	3^{+8}	8	3^{+8}	2	4^{+8}	4	4^{+9}	C	962
3	Honda	3^{+8}	3	1^{+10}	1	1^{+9}	1	5^{+10}	2	1^{+9}	1	2^{+10}	8	3^{+5}	3	3	4	11^{+9}	7	10^{+6}	9	4^{+7}	6	5^{+7}	2	6^{+7}	4	2^{+8}	7	7^{+4}	11	4^{+8}	7	6^{+6}	3	4^{+7}	4	2^{+9}	2	3^{+6}	C	864
4	Yamaha	2^{+10}	1	3^{+9}	7	7^{+7}	5	10^{+4}	4	4^{+7}	7	5^{+8}	9	5^{+9}	4	2^{+10}	3	4^{+6}	4	3^{+4}	4	9	4	6^{+5}	6	4^{+9}	3	6^{+6}	4	3^{+8}	5	3^{+6}	3	7	7	6^{+6}	6	3^{+7}	5	6^{+7}	C	794
5	Fantic	5^{+5}	7	4^{+7}	2	11	4	2^{+7}	3	5^{+4}	3	4^{+7}	5	6^{+3}	5	5^{+2}	7	6^{+2}	6	8	5	3^{+6}	5	1^{+8}	5	2^{+8}	5	4^{+7}	3	5^{+6}	3	6^{+7}	5	4^{+9}	4	12	9	7^{+2}	8	8	C	737
6	Ducati	4^{+7}	4	14	9	4	7	15	9	6^{+8}	19	7^{+5}	3	9^{+2}	10	10^{+5}	5	5^{+4}	3	5^{+2}	14	14^{+1}	12	7^{+1}	8	11^{+1}	10	8^{+3}	6	20	17	10	11	16	17	10	16	11	10	7^{+8}	C	490
7	Beta	16	15	15	13	14	12	8^{+1}	12	12^{+3}	12	18	7	14	15	12	11	9	11	14	13	8^{+2}	10	16	12	12^{+2}	11	12	12	11	10	21	Ret	10	18	16	13	18	13	16	C	314
8	Husqvarna	21	20	12	19	18	20	19	17	27	17	20	15	17^{+7}	14	DNS	DNS	29	28	23	21	23	23	19	21	17	15	20	19	13	22	16	19	9	27	Ret	DNS	17	16	15	C	108
9	Triumph					24	Ret					34	28					18	19	34	27	DNS	DNS					24	24			Ret	20					Ret	18	20	C	10
10	Gas Gas									24	28							Ret	Ret	32	25	25	27			18	17	21	25			22	25			22	22					7
Pos	Bike	ARG (Argentina)		CAS		EUR (Europe)		SAR (Sardinia)		TRE		SUI (Switzerland)		POR (Portugal)		ESP (Spain)		FRA (France)		GER (Germany)		LAT (Latvia)		GBR (United Kingdom)		FIN (Finland)		CZE (Czech Republic)		FLA (Flanders)		SWE (Sweden)		NED (Netherlands)		TUR (Turkey)		CHN (China)		AUS (Australia)		Points

== MX2 ==
=== Entry list ===
Officially Approved Teams & Riders
Team	Constructor	No	Rider	Rounds
Nestaan Husqvarna Factory Racing	Husqvarna	1	(Netherlands) Kay de Wolf	All
Nestaan Husqvarna Factory Racing	Husqvarna	26	(Belgium) Liam Everts	1–13, 16–20
Monster Energy Yamaha Factory	Yamaha	4	(Netherlands) Rick Elzinga	1–9, 12–13, 15–20
Monster Energy Yamaha Factory	Yamaha	9	(France) Thibault Benistant	1–18
Monster Energy Yamaha Factory	Yamaha	47	(Latvia) Kārlis Reišulis	All
Monster Energy Triumph Racing	Triumph	8	(South Africa) Camden McLellan	All
Monster Energy Triumph Racing	Triumph	99	(Spain) Guillem Farrés	1–3, 6–20
Honda HRC	Honda	18	(Italy) Valerio Lata	All
Honda HRC	Honda	73	(Italy) Ferruccio Zanchi	1–10
Red Bull KTM Factory Racing	KTM	19	(Belgium) Sacha Coenen	All
Red Bull KTM Factory Racing	KTM	27	(Germany) Simon Längenfelder	All
Red Bull KTM Factory Racing	KTM	28	(France) Marc-Antoine Rossi	1
Red Bull KTM Factory Racing	KTM	80	(Italy) Andrea Adamo	All
TM Moto CRD Motosport	TM	20	(Czech Republic) Julius Mikula	1–17
JM Honda Racing	Honda	22	(Spain) David Braceras	1–12, 14–15
KTM BTS Racing Team	KTM	51	(Spain) Oriol Oliver	1–3
KTM BTS Racing Team	KTM	489	(Netherlands) Jens Walvoort	1–2, 5, 12–20
WZ Racing Team	KTM	83	(France) Maxime Grau	5–13, 16–18
WZ Racing Team	KTM	319	(France) Quentin-Marc Prugnières	1–13
VNT Racing KTM	KTM	114	(Belgium) Nicolas Vennekens	1–8, 10, 12–17
Van Venrooy KTM Racing	KTM	172	(Netherlands) Cas Valk	1–18
KL Racing Team	KTM	256	(Denmark) Magnus Smith	1–13, 16–17
KL Racing Team	KTM	414	(Denmark) Oscar Brix	5–6
Kawasaki Racing Team MXGP	Kawasaki	317	(France) Mathis Valin	1–3, 7-20
Wild Card Teams & Riders
Team	Constructor	No	Rider	Rounds
Winner Triumph Racing Australia	Triumph	13	(Australia) Deacon Paice	20
HTS KTM Racing Team	KTM	14	(Hungary) Bence Pergel	3, 5
HTS KTM Racing Team	KTM	696	(Switzerland) Mike Gwerder	3, 6, 9–10
Husqvarna Switzerland	Husqvarna	25	(Portugal) Alexandre Marques	6
	Honda	30	(Argentina) Benjamín Pascual	1
Kawasaki Nederland/Abrex Logistics	Kawasaki	33	(Netherlands) Kay Karssemakers	10, 12
Bike It Kawasaki Racing Team	Kawasaki	33	(Netherlands) Kay Karssemakers	14–20
Cat Moto Bauerschmidt Husqvarna	Husqvarna	36	(Switzerland) Nico Greutmann	15
Cat Moto Bauerschmidt Husqvarna	Husqvarna	304	(Australia) Liam Owens	10, 15
Cat Moto Bauerschmidt Husqvarna	Husqvarna	515	(Denmark) Mads Fredsøe	10, 15
Yamaha Monster Energy Geração	Yamaha	44	(Brazil) Marcello Silva	1
Yamaha Monster Energy Geração	Yamaha	166	(Brazil) Pietro Piroli	1
KTM Uruguay	KTM	46	(Uruguay) Alfonso Bratschi	1
Gabriel SS24 KTM Factory Juniors	KTM	51	(Spain) Oriol Oliver	5–12, 14, 16–18
Gabriel SS24 KTM Factory Juniors	KTM	54	(Germany) Maximilian Werner	14–15
Gabriel SS24 KTM Factory Juniors	KTM	574	(Netherlands) Gyan Doenson	15
Team Castellari	Gas Gas	62	(Italy) Davide Zampino	5–6, 14
Peklaj Husqvarna Racing Team	Husqvarna	63	(Slovenia) Jaka Peklaj	10, 14, 16–17
Ride Red Program	Honda	64	(New Zealand) Seth Morrow	20
Ausió Yamaha Racing Team	Yamaha	68	(Spain) Unai Larrañaga	8
KTM Kosak Team	KTM	75	(Netherlands) Bradley Mesters	15
	Husqvarna	82	(Switzerland) Samuel Öchslin	6
	Husqvarna	214	(Switzerland) Thomas Öchslin	6
	Husqvarna	611	(Switzerland) Matthias Öchslin	6
ProParts/Nikilon Powersports	Husqvarna	88	(Ecuador) Italo Medina	1
Team Ride Innovation Development	Kawasaki	95	(France) Enzo Casat	3
Fantic Factory Racing EMX250	Fantic	97	(Italy) Simone Mancini	10
SMX Racing Team Rudnik	Yamaha	120	(Czech Republic) Daniel Mandys	14
D.V.S Junior Racing	TM	122	(Indonesia) Akbar Lubis	2, 14
D.V.S Junior Racing	TM	524	(Belgium) Emile De Baere	9–12, 14–16
D.V.S Junior Racing	TM	744	(France) Saad Soulimani	2–3, 5–7
	Honda	139	(China) Zou Shaohui	19
SAS TPC KTM	KTM	147	(France) Florian Miot	12
Kawasaki Uruguay	Kawasaki	153	(Uruguay) Miqueas Chambón	1
Mezher Motors	KTM	154	(Bolivia) Carlos Andrés Padilla	1
KTM Kosak Team	KTM	170	(Germany) Valentin Kees	10, 14
Castrol – Axion Sport MX Team	Husqvarna	191	(Argentina) Juan Ignacio Salgado	1
Orion Racing Team	KTM	199	(Czech Republic) Petr Rathouský	5, 14
Young Motion powered by Resa	KTM	220	(Estonia) Martin Michelis	3, 9, 14–15, 17
Young Motion powered by Resa	KTM	338	(Sweden) Filip Olsson	3, 5, 9–12, 14–17
Young Motion powered by Resa	Triumph	368	(Spain) Samuel Nilsson	2–3, 5, 7–8
	KTM	234	(Switzerland) Remo Schudel	3, 6, 9
Yamaha Blue Bikes	Yamaha	251	(Chile) Iñaki Abarzua	1
KTM Racing Team	KTM	265	(Australia) Byron Dennis	19–20
MotoXGeneration	Husqvarna	270	(Israel) Ofir Casey Tzemach	3
Wozniak MX Racing Team	Yamaha	276	(Denmark) Nicolai Skovbjerg	4, 15
Lelli Competición	Honda	288	(Argentina) Ignacio Liprandi	1
Motos VR Yamaha	Yamaha	331	(Portugal) Sandro Lobo	7
KTM Sarholz Racing Team	Husqvarna	363	(Liechtenstein) Lyonel Reichl	14
RFME Spain National Team	Gas Gas	366	(Spain) Adrià Monné	19–20
KMP Honda Racing Team by DVAG	Honda	382	(Spain) Manuel López	10
Team TMX Competition	Yamaha	389	(France) Jules Pietre	3
RT400/Pol Motors	Gas Gas	400	(Netherlands) Roan Tolsma	11, 15, 17
De Baets Yamaha MX Team	Yamaha	401	(Netherlands) Lotte van Drunen	5, 15
Dörr Motorsport Triumph Racing	Triumph	408	(Netherlands) Scott Smulders	3–4, 6, 9–11, 14–15, 17
JWR Honda Racing	Honda	422	(Sweden) Hugo Forsgren	15
VHR VRT Yamaha Official EMX250 Team	Yamaha	432	(Netherlands) Ivano van Erp	10
VHR VRT Yamaha Official EMX250 Team	Yamaha	772	(Latvia) Jānis Reišulis	10
	KTM	434	(China) Yang Jinyu	19
Q Racing Team	Gas Gas	437	(Czech Republic) Martin Venhoda	10, 14
Q Racing Team	Gas Gas	494	(Czech Republic) David Widerwill	14
Chambers KTM Racing	KTM	456	(United Kingdom) Ollie Colmer	15
Osička MX Team	KTM	466	(Czech Republic) Václav Janout	10, 14
Husqvarna Scandinavia	Husqvarna	471	(Norway) Pelle Gundersen	14–17
SixtySeven Racing Team	Husqvarna	473	(Germany) Collin Wohnhas	5–6, 9–10, 12
Team Motopalvelu	KTM	480	(Finland) Kasimir Hindersson	13
	KTM	481	(Norway) Markus Sommerstad	15
MRA Racing Team	Gas Gas	490	(Slovakia) Jaroslav Katriňák	14
Motorhomes Dirk Hofman	Husqvarna	524	(Belgium) Emile De Baere	5
Team MC Konsult	Triumph	567	(Sweden) Rasmus Moen	16
	Kawasaki	767	(China) Li Haoyu	19
JK Racing Yamaha	Yamaha	841	(Sweden) Nellie Fransson	19
	Yamaha	911	(Turkey) Burak Arlı	18
GI Cross Racing Team	Husqvarna	938	(Brazil) Rodolfo Bicalho	5–6, 8
Meca Motor	KTM	938	(Brazil) Rodolfo Bicalho	12, 16
	KTM	941	(Germany) Lukas Albers	5–6, 10

==== Riders Championship ====
Points are awarded to the top-ten finishers of the qualifying race, in the following format:

Position	1st	2nd	3rd	4th	5th	6th	7th	8th	9th	10th
Points	10	9	8	7	6	5	4	3	2	1

Points are awarded to finishers of the main races, in the following format:

Position	1st	2nd	3rd	4th	5th	6th	7th	8th	9th	10th	11th	12th	13th	14th	15th	16th	17th	18th	19th	20th
Points	25	22	20	18	16	15	14	13	12	11	10	9	8	7	6	5	4	3	2	1

Pos	Nr	Rider	Bike	ARG (Argentina)		CAS		EUR (Europe)		SAR (Sardinia)		TRE		SUI (Switzerland)		POR (Portugal)		ESP (Spain)		FRA (France)		GER (Germany)		LAT (Latvia)		GBR (United Kingdom)		FIN (Finland)		CZE (Czech Republic)		FLA (Flanders)		SWE (Sweden)		NED (Netherlands)		TUR (Turkey)		CHN (China)		AUS (Australia)		Points
1	27	(Germany) Simon Längenfelder	KTM	2^{+7}	6	5	4	1^{+9}	3	3^{+10}	6	7^{+8}	3	1^{+9}	1	2^{+6}	4	8^{+8}	3	1^{+9}	1	3^{+7}	9	2^{+10}	3	1^{+10}	1	6^{+7}	5	1^{+5}	2	7^{+7}	4	5^{+9}	1	8	5	3^{+5}	1	3^{+9}	2	2^{+7}	6	928
2	1	(Netherlands) Kay de Wolf	Husqvarna	1^{+8}	5	3^{+6}	2	6	4	1^{+5}	1	2^{+6}	4	2^{+10}	4	3^{+7}	3	1^{+9}	4	14^{+3}	12	7	2	8^{+5}	1	7	8	1^{+10}	1	6^{+8}	4	1^{+10}	1	3^{+8}	3	1^{+4}	1	2^{+9}	2	2^{+7}	4	1^{+10}	5	919
3	80	(Italy) Andrea Adamo	KTM	Ret^{+10}	2	9^{+7}	3	2^{+6}	1	4^{+7}	2	3	2	5^{+7}	2	1^{+10}	1	5	1	2^{+10}	2	1^{+8}	3	11	9	10^{+6}	4	2^{+5}	3	5^{+7}	1	3^{+9}	8	1^{+2}	8	3^{+10}	3	8^{+1}	9	4^{+3}	1	6^{+6}	14	845
4	19	(Belgium) Sacha Coenen	KTM	9^{+9}	1	11^{+9}	15	4^{+5}	14	5^{+8}	4	9	7	6	16	19^{+9}	2	6^{+5}	2	6^{+8}	4	2^{+9}	15	1	2	2^{+7}	6	4^{+9}	2	2^{+3}	8	4^{+4}	2	2^{+4}	7	2^{+9}	4	1^{+10}	4	1^{+10}	3	13^{+9}	1	798
5	8	(South Africa) Camden McLellan	Triumph	5	8	10	19	10^{+7}	9	2^{+4}	3	1^{+7}	16	4^{+4}	7	16^{+5}	12	7^{+3}	7	7	11	8^{+1}	6	5	7	4^{+4}	9	5^{+4}	6	13	5	2^{+8}	3	7^{+7}	5	5^{+6}	2	7^{+7}	8	7	5	7^{+4}	15	636
6	26	(Belgium) Liam Everts	Husqvarna	8^{+3}	3	2^{+8}	1	3^{+8}	5	6^{+9}	5	4^{+10}	Ret	3^{+8}	3	11^{+8}	Ret	2^{+7}	6	8^{+1}	5	6^{+5}	7	3^{+6}	5	6^{+8}	2	DNS	DNS					4^{+3}	9	4^{+8}	6	5^{+6}	5	6^{+1}	7	5	8	635
7	9	(France) Thibault Benistant	Yamaha	11^{+5}	10	4^{+10}	12	5^{+10}	2	14^{+6}	17	12^{+9}	1	11^{+6}	5	13	7	3^{+10}	5	11^{+7}	3	5^{+3}	11	7^{+9}	4	11^{+9}	3	3^{+3}	4	7^{+6}	7	Ret^{+6}	6	8^{+10}	2	16	9	10^{+3}	7					603
8	99	(Spain) Guillem Farrés	Triumph	6	11	16^{+1}	6	DNS	DNS					7	8	12^{+4}	8	11	15	10	6	9^{+2}	1	9^{+2}	6	5	5	7^{+8}	12	4^{+1}	6	14	10	9^{+6}	6	9^{+2}	8	6^{+8}	3	8^{+6}	6	3^{+8}	10	500
9	18	(Italy) Valerio Lata	Honda	7	12	13	11	7^{+4}	15	11	12	5^{+4}	14	10^{+5}	6	9	15	9^{+1}	12	3^{+6}	10	4^{+10}	4	Ret	Ret	14	12	13	13	8^{+9}	10	13	11	10^{+1}	15	10	12	9^{+4}	10	5^{+8}	11	9	2	481
10	317	(France) Mathis Valin	Kawasaki	Ret^{+6}	4	20	DNS	13	8							6^{+1}	5	10	18	5	8	Ret^{+6}	Ret	4^{+4}	10	8^{+2}	7	8^{+6}	7	3^{+10}	3	5^{+5}	5	6^{+5}	4	6^{+5}	14	4^{+2}	6	12^{+4}	9	4^{+5}	11	467
11	47	(Latvia) Kārlis Reišulis	Yamaha	12^{+4}	7	15	14	11^{+3}	16	9	9	22^{+2}	10	12	9	Ret	11	Ret	9	15^{+2}	13	12	14	6^{+8}	11	15	21	9^{+1}	8	9	9	10	17	Ret	10	DNS	DNS	14	15	10^{+5}	10	10^{+2}	4	356
12	172	(Netherlands) Cas Valk	KTM	3	13	6^{+2}	5	8^{+2}	6	8^{+1}	11	6^{+5}	5	8^{+1}	12	Ret	6	18^{+4}	Ret	16^{+4}	9	16	12	15^{+7}	12	12	16	11^{+2}	11	11	Ret	6	Ret	11	17	11^{+3}	11	17	DNS					355
13	4	(Netherlands) Rick Elzinga	Yamaha	10	14	Ret	13	14	12	7^{+2}	7	8^{+1}	9	13	10	5	13	13^{+2}	8	DNS	DNS					Ret	15	10	9			Ret^{+3}	7	13	12	7^{+7}	7	13	16	9^{+2}	8	8^{+3}	3	338
14	51	(Spain) Oriol Oliver	KTM	Ret^{+2}	9	14^{+4}	9	12	13			15	6	9^{+3}	26	14	14	16	11	4^{+5}	7	10^{+4}	5	14^{+3}	8	3^{+5}	10			31	DNS			17	13	14	13	11	14					290
15	73	(Italy) Ferruccio Zanchi	Honda	15	15	1^{+5}	10	15^{+1}	7	12^{+3}	10	10	8	14^{+2}	11	7^{+2}	9	4^{+6}	10	9	16	DNS	DNS																					220
16	319	(France) Quentin-Marc Prugnières	KTM	14	16	7^{+3}	7	9	26	13	8	13^{+3}	13	15	14	4^{+3}	10	15	16	12	15	13	Ret	10	18	13	17	12	15															215
17	20	(Czech Republic) Julius Mikula	TM	13	19	8	8	16	11	DNS	DNS	14	15	18	Ret	8	16	12	14	18	19	14	8	13^{+1}	17	Ret	13	17	14	12^{+4}	13	17	15	15	11	Ret	DNS							205
18	22	(Spain) David Braceras	Honda	4	18	12	20	18	10	10	14	11	11	16	13	10	18	17	17	19	17	20	Ret	12	13	9^{+3}	11			10	11	Ret^{+2}	DNS											190
19	489	(Netherlands) Jens Walvoort	KTM	Ret^{+1}	17	DNS	DNS					19	21													Ret	19	15	10	14^{+2}	12	8^{+1}	9	Ret	16	12^{+1}	Ret	12	12	13	12	11	9	142
20	83	(France) Maxime Grau	KTM									18	12	26	17	20	17	14	13	13	14	11	10	20	19	Ret^{+1}	14	18	DNS					14	14	19	15	15	11					124
21	33	(Netherlands) Kay Karssemakers	Kawasaki																			19	18			16	18			15	14	11	24	12	18	13	10	16	13	11	18	14^{+1}	7	115
22	256	(Denmark) Magnus Smith	KTM	22	DNS	17	18	17	21	17	15	16	17	19	19	17	20	19	19	20	Ret	22	23	18	15	19	20	DNS	DNS					16	19	17	18							70
23	408	(Netherlands) Scott Smulders	Triumph					23	19	16	18			21	20					22	20	24	22	17	14					18	21	15	14			15	16							50
24	114	(Belgium) Nicolas Vennekens	KTM	18	24	18	17	25	25	18	16	29	24	23	27	18	19	20	21			27	Ret			21	Ret	16	17	22	Ret	26	Ret	20	22	21	19							36
25	276	(Denmark) Nicolai Skovbjerg	Yamaha							15	13																					9	12											35
26	696	(Switzerland) Mike Gwerder	KTM					22	17					17	15					17	18	15	16																					32
27	366	(Spain) Adrià Monné	Gas Gas																																					14	13	15	17	25
28	265	(Australia) Byron Dennis	KTM																																					18	14	12	16	24
29	744	(Morocco) Saad Soulimani	TM			19	16	Ret	27			21	19	20	18	15	Ret																											19
30	36	(Switzerland) Nico Greutmann	Husqvarna																													12	13											17
31	338	(Sweden) Filip Olsson	KTM					24	Ret			20	20							21	Ret	Ret	20	16	20	17	Ret			24	Ret	22	Ret	18	20	DNS	DNS							17
32	515	(Denmark) Mads Fredsøe	Husqvarna																			18	13									Ret	18											14
33	13	(Australia) Deacon Paice	Triumph																																							17	12	13
34	64	(New Zealand) Seth Morrow	Honda																																							16	13	13
35	480	(Finland) Kasimir Hindersson	KTM																									14	16															12
36	767	(China) Li Haoyu	Kawaski																																					15	15			12
37	363	(Liechtenstein) Lyonel Reichl	Husqvarna																											16	15													11
38	434	(China) Yang Jinyu	KTM																																					16	16			10
39	368	(Spain) Samuel Nilsson	Triumph			Ret	DNS	20	20			17	18			DNS	DNS	Ret	20																									10
40	471	(Norway) Pelle Gundersen	Husqvarna																											23	20	20	25	Ret	24	18	17							9
41	304	(Australia) Liam Owens	Husqvarna																			23	17									16	Ret											9
42	400	(Netherlands) Roan Tolsma	Gas Gas																					19	16							21	21			20	Ret							8
43	841	(Sweden) Nellie Fransson	Yamaha																																					17	17			8
44	170	(Germany) Valentin Kees	KTM																			21	Ret							17	17													8
45	911	(Turkey) Burak Arlı	Yamaha																																			18	17					7
46	28	(France) Marc-Antoine Rossi	KTM	16	20																																							6
47	75	(Netherlands) Bradley Mesters	KTM																													Ret	16											5
48	199	(Czech Republic) Petr Rathouský	KTM									23	22																	25	16													5
49	437	(Czech Republic) Martin Venhoda	Gas Gas																			28	Ret							19	18													5
50	574	(Netherlands) Gyan Doenson	KTM																													18	19											5
51	44	(Brazil) Marcello Silva	Yamaha	17	21																																							4
52	432	(Netherlands) Ivano van Erp	Yamaha																			17	Ret																					4
53	473	(Germany) Collin Wohnhas	Husqvarna									28	Ret	28	24					23	23	26	21			18	23																	3
54	14	(Hungary) Bence Pergel	KTM					21	18			DNS	DNS																															3
55	63	(Slovenia) Jaka Peklaj	Husqvarna																			29	24							29	25			19	23	22	20							3
56	456	(United Kingdom) Ollie Colmer	KTM																													19	20											3
57	389	(France) Jules Pietre	Yamaha					19	22																																			2
58	466	(Czech Republic) Václav Janout	KTM																			30	Ret							33	19													2
59	382	(Spain) Manuel Carreras	Honda																			25	19																					2
60	30	(Argentina) Bejamín Pascual	Honda	19	27																																							2
61	938	(Brazil) Rodolfo Bicalho	Husqvarna									27	26	31	30			21	22																									1
61	938	(Brazil) Rodolfo Bicalho	KTM																							20	25							21	25									1
62	166	(Brazil) Pietro Piroli	Yamaha	20	22																																							1
63	54	(Germany) Maximilian Werner	KTM																											20	23	25	22											1
	234	(Switzerland) Remo Schudel	KTM					26	23					24	22					Ret	21																							0
	82	(Switzerland) Samuel Oechslin	Husqvarna											22	21																													0
	567	(Sweden) Rasmus Moen	Triumph																															22	21									0
	46	(Uruguay) Alfonso Bratschi	KTM	21	23																																							0
	220	(Estonia) Martin Michelis	KTM					27	24											25	Ret									21	Ret	DNS	DNS			DNS	DNS							0
	524	(Belgium) Emile De Baere	Husqvarna									DNS	DNS																															0
	524	(Belgium) Emile De Baere	TM																	24	22	Ret	25	Ret	Ret	Ret	22			32	22	Ret	Ret	Ret	DNS									0
	401	(Netherlands) Lotte van Drunen	Yamaha									26	27																			24	23											0
	62	(Italy) Davide Zampino	Gas Gas									25	23	29	29															28	26													0
	251	(Chile) Iñaki Abarzua	Yamaha	23	25																																							0
	25	(Portugal) Alexandre Marques	Husqvarna											Ret	23																													0
	422	(Sweden) Hugo Forsgren	Honda																													23	Ret											0
	414	(Denmark) Oscar Brix	KTM									24	25	30	31																													0
	154	(Bolivia) Carlos Andrés Padilla	KTM	24	26																																							0
	494	(Czech Republic) David Widerwill	Gas Gas																											26	24													0
	147	(France) Florian Miot	KTM																							Ret	24																	0
	611	(Switzerland) Matthias Oechslin	Husqvarna											27	25																													0
	191	(Argentina) Juan Ignacio Salgado	Husqvarna	25	28																																							0
	214	(Switzerland) Thomas Oechslin	Husqvarna											25	28																													0
	481	(Norway) Markus Sommerstad	KTM																													Ret	26											0
	120	(Czech Republic) Daniel Mandys	Yamaha																											27	27													0
	270	(Israel) Ofir Casey Tzemach	Husqvarna					28	28																																			0
	941	(Germany) Lukas Albers	KTM									30	28	32	DNS							31	DNS																					0
	288	(Argentina) Ignacio Liprandi	Honda	Ret	29																																							0
	122	(Indonesia) Akbar Lubis	TM			DNS	DNS																							30	Ret													0
	153	(Uruguay) Miqueas Chambón	Kawasaki	Ret	30																																							0
	88	(Ecuador) Italo Medina	Husqvarna	Ret	31																																							0
	95	(France) Enzo Casat	Kawasaki					Ret	Ret																																			0
	97	(Italy) Simone Mancini	Fantic																			Ret	Ret																					0
	68	(Spain) Unai Larrañaga	Yamaha															Ret	DNS																									0
	490	(Slovakia) Jaroslav Katriňák	Gas Gas																											Ret	DNS													0
	331	(Portugal) Sandro Lobo	Yamaha													DNS	DNS																											0
	772	(Latvia) Jānis Reišulis	Yamaha																			DNS	DNS																					0
	139	(China) Zou Shaohui	Honda																																					DNS	DNS			0
Pos	Nr	Rider	Bike	ARG (Argentina)		CAS		EUR (Europe)		SAR (Sardinia)		TRE		SUI (Switzerland)		POR (Portugal)		ESP (Spain)		FRA (France)		GER (Germany)		LAT (Latvia)		GBR (United Kingdom)		FIN (Finland)		CZE (Czech Republic)		FLA (Flanders)		SWE (Sweden)		NED (Netherlands)		TUR (Turkey)		CHN (China)		AUS (Australia)		Points

==== Manufacturers Championship ====
Pos	Bike	ARG (Argentina)		CAS		EUR (Europe)		SAR (Sardinia)		TRE		SUI (Switzerland)		POR (Portugal)		ESP (Spain)		FRA (France)		GER (Germany)		LAT (Latvia)		GBR (United Kingdom)		FIN (Finland)		CZE (Czech Republic)		FLA (Flanders)		SWE (Sweden)		NED (Netherlands)		TUR (Turkey)		CHN (China)		AUS (Australia)		Points
1	KTM	2^{+10}	1	5^{+9}	3	1^{+9}	1	3^{+10}	2	3^{+8}	2	1^{+9}	1	1^{+10}	1	5^{+8}	1	1^{+10}	1	1^{+9}	3	1^{+10}	2	1^{+10}	1	2^{+9}	2	1^{+7}	1	3^{+9}	2	1^{+9}	1	2^{+10}	3	1^{+10}	1	1^{+10}	1	2^{+9}	1	1110
2	Husqvarna	1^{+8}	3	2^{+8}	1	3^{+8}	4	1^{+9}	1	2^{+10}	4	2^{+10}	3	3^{+8}	3	1^{+9}	4	8^{+3}	5	6^{+5}	2	3^{+6}	1	6^{+8}	2	1^{+10}	1	6^{+8}	4	1^{+10}	1	3^{+8}	3	1^{+8}	1	2^{+9}	2	2^{+7}	4	1^{+10}	5	1003
3	Yamaha	10^{+5}	7	4^{+10}	12	5^{+10}	2	7^{+6}	7	8^{+9}	1	11^{+6}	5	5	7	3^{+10}	5	11^{+7}	3	5^{+3}	11	6^{+9}	4	11^{+9}	3	3^{+3}	4	7^{+6}	7	9^{+6}	6	8^{+10}	2	7^{+7}	7	10^{+3}	7	9^{+5}	8	8^{+3}	3	733
4	Triumph	5	8	10^{+1}	6	10^{+7}	9	2^{+4}	3	1^{+7}	16	4^{+4}	7	12^{+5}	8	7^{+3}	7	7	6	8^{+2}	1	5^{+2}	6	4^{+4}	5	5^{+8}	6	4^{+1}	5	2^{+8}	3	7^{+7}	5	5^{+6}	2	6^{+8}	3	7^{+6}	5	3^{+8}	10	726
5	Honda	4	12	1^{+5}	10	7^{+4}	7	10^{+3}	10	5^{+4}	8	10^{+5}	6	7^{+2}	9	4^{+6}	10	3^{+6}	10	4^{+10}	4	12	13	9^{+3}	11	13	13	8^{+9}	10	13^{+2}	11	10^{+1}	15	10	12	9^{+4}	10	5^{+8}	11	9	2	579
6	Kawasaki	Ret^{+6}	4	20	DNS	13	8							6^{+1}	5	10	18	5	8	19^{+6}	18	4^{+4}	10	8^{+2}	7	8^{+6}	7	3^{+10}	3	5^{+5}	5	6^{+5}	4	6^{+5}	10	4^{+2}	6	11^{+4}	9	4^{+5}	7	481
7	TM	13	19	8	8	16	11	DNS	DNS	14	15	18	18	8	16	12	14	18	19	14	8	13^{+1}	17	Ret	13	17	14	12^{+4}	13	17	15	15	11	Ret	DNS							208
8	Gas Gas									25	23	29	29							28	Ret	19	16					19	18	21	21			20	Ret			14	13	15	17	38
Pos	Bike	ARG (Argentina)		CAS		EUR (Europe)		SAR (Sardinia)		TRE		SUI (Switzerland)		POR (Portugal)		ESP (Spain)		FRA (France)		GER (Germany)		LAT (Latvia)		GBR (United Kingdom)		FIN (Finland)		CZE (Czech Republic)		FLA (Flanders)		SWE (Sweden)		NED (Netherlands)		TUR (Turkey)		CHN (China)		AUS (Australia)		Points

== See also ==
- 2025 FIM Women's Motocross World Championship
- 2025 European Motocross Championship
- 2025 Motocross des Nations
- 2025 FIM Supercross World Championship
- 2025 ProMX Championship
- 2025 AMA Supercross Championship
- 2025 AMA National Motocross Championship
