= Calvin Vlaanderen =

Dutch motocross racer

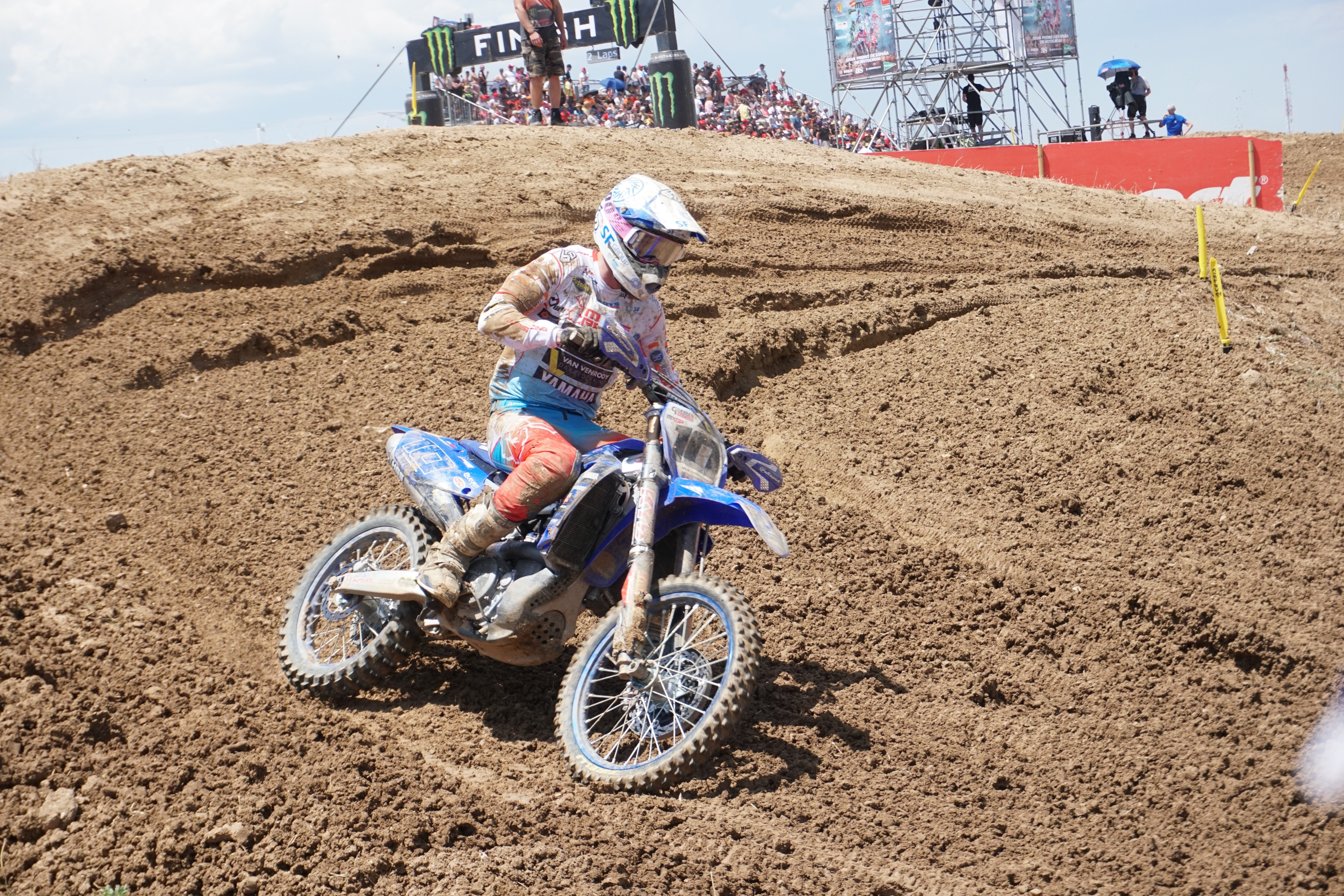
- Vlaanderen in 2022
- Nationality: Dutch
- Born: 24 June 1996 (age 30); Port Elizabeth, South Africa
- Current team: Ducati Factory Racing MXGP
- Bike number: 10

Calvin Vlaanderen (born 24 June 1996) is a South African-born Dutch professional Motocross racer.

Vlaanderen is a two time grand prix winner at FIM Motocross World Championship level.

Vlaanderen was also a member of the victorious Dutch team at the 2019 Motocross des Nations.

Domestically, he won the 500cc class in the 2022 Dutch Masters of Motocross.

Vlaanderen, through his grandparents, has dual nationality between his birth country of South Africa and The Netherlands.

== Career ==
=== Junior career ===
After picking up numerous South African national motocross titles from 50cc to 125cc between 2003 and 2011, Vlaanderen competed in the FIM Motocross Junior World Championship in 2011, finishing in tenth overall in the 125 class. In the following year, Vlaanderen moved to Germany full-time and competed in his season in the European Motocross Championship. Vlaanderen was able to finish tenth in the championship but picked up two overall podiums in Italy and Portugal. In the 2012 FIM Junior World Championship, Vlaanderen bettered the previous season's result, riding to seventh overall.

2013 would be Vlaanderen's last season aboard a 125. This would be his best season at European level, finishing third in the European Championship with three podiums to his name. Vlaanderen then followed this up by finishing runner-up in that year's Junior World Championship, winning the second race en route to this.

=== 250 career ===
Staying with the Bodo Schmidt KTM team, Vlaanderen moved up to the 250 in 2014. He put in a consistent season in the EMX250 class of the European Motocross Championship, finishing eighth in the final standings and taking a win in the first race at the final round. On top of this, Vlaanderen competed in his first two MX2 grand prix in the 2014 FIM Motocross World Championship, with a best finish of thirteenth in race one in the Czech Republic.

Vlaanderen moved to the HSF Logistics team to compete in the MX2 world championship full time. Unfortunately, due to injury, he was not able to make his debut until the penultimate round of the season. He continued with the HSF team for the following two seasons, putting in consistent performances throughout both campaigns. His first overall podium came in 2016, with third overall in Latvia. These performances were enough for Vlaanderen to be signed by Team HRC, Honda's factory team in the MX2 World Championship for 2018. This move allowed Vlaanderen to have by far his best season at world championship level until that point. The season saw him take two race wins and his first overall grand prix win at the first Indonesian grand prix, on his way to sixth in the final standings. Following his first grand prix win, the South African motorcycle federation, Motorsport South Africa, complained to world championship promoter Youthstream regarding the South African flag being flown on the podium. His performance throughout the season, would earn Vlaanderen his first call up to compete for The Netherlands at the 2018 Motocross des Nations. As a team, the Dutch were able to finish second overall after his teammates Jeffrey Herlings and Glenn Coldenhoff won all three races. However, Vlaanderen was not able to start his second race due to an eye injury sustained in the opening race of the day.

2019 would be Vlaanderen's last season in the MX2 class. He missed several rounds of the season and finished eighth in the final standings, picking up a race win and four overall podiums on the way. He once again represented The Netherlands for the 2019 Motocross des Nations, held on home turf in Assen. After finishing second in the MX2 qualifying race, Vlaanderen picked up two tenth-place finishes in the main races on the Sunday. These results helped the country win its first title in Motocross des Nations history.

=== 450 career ===
For the 2020 FIM Motocross World Championship, Vlaanderen had to move up to the MXGP class and was picked up by the Gebben Van Venrooy Yamaha team. He had a consistent rookie season in the class, with a best race finish of fifth in Mantua, eventually finishing the championship in sixteenth. In the 2021 season, Vlaanderen improved his final ranking to fourteenth overall despite missing the final five rounds of the championship.

The 2022 world championship season would be a break through year for Vlaanderen in the MXGP class. After a start to the season where he steadily improved, Vlaanderen was able to record a dominant double race victory and grand prix overall win in Sardinia. A second overall podium in Belgium would also contribute to his final ranking of seventh in the championship. Domestically, he was able to win the 500cc class in the Dutch Masters of Motocross, whilst he made his third appearance at the Motocross des Nations. The Dutch team finished in seventh overall at Red Bud, with Vlaanderen having the highest individual race finish in the team. Vlaanderen carried this good form into the 2023 season, finishing consistently in the top-5 all year and achieving sixth overall in the final standings (finishing as the highest-placed non-factory rider). He picked up a single race win at the Czech round and made his fourth appearance at the Motocross des Nations, where the Dutch team was hampered by the injury of Glenn Coldenhoff. These results would see Vlaanderen signed by Yamaha's factory MXGP team for 2024, marking his return to factory equipment for the first time since his MX2 days.

Vlaanderen would build into becoming a consistent top-six finisher as the 2024 FIM Motocross World Championship progressed, finishing third overall at the eleventh and twelfth rounds. In the first race at the Dutch round, he crashed and injured his knee which saw him miss the final four rounds as well as finishing seventh in the final standings. Prior to this, he finished third in the 2024 Dutch Masters of Motocross for the second year in a row. The 2025 FIM Motocross World Championship saw Vlaanderen continue to be consistent, finishing on the bottom step of the podium on three occasions in Finland, Belgium and Sweden. After finishing sixth in the standings, he was selected to represent The Netherlands once again at the 2025 Motocross des Nations. Vlaanderen placed third in his qualifier but the teams performance was hampered when teammate Glenn Coldenhoff was unable to compete in the main Sunday races due to injury.

Vlaanderen lost his place at the factory Yamaha team for the 2026 FIM Motocross World Championship season, eventually finding a home as one of the three riders to represent Ducati in their second MXGP campaign. With all three riders struggling to make the new motorcycle competitive, Vlaanderen's four top-five race finishes were the highlight of the season. Alongside ending the championship eleventh overall, he finished third in the 2026 Dutch Masters of Motocross. After a single season, Vlaanderen left the factory Ducati team to join the French-based SR Motoblouz team for 2027.

== Honours ==
Motocross des Nations

- Team Overall: 2019 (gold) , 2018 (silver)

FIM Junior Motocross World Championship

- 125: 2013 (silver)

European Motocross Championship

- EMX125: 2013 (bronze)

Dutch Masters of Motocross

- 500cc: 2022 (gold) , 2023, 2024 & 2026 (bronze)

ADAC MX Masters (Germany)

- Youngster: 2014 (silver)

== Career statistics ==
=== Motocross des Nations ===
Year	Location	Nation	Class	Teammates	Team Overall	Individual Overall
2018	(United States) Red Bud	NED	MX2	Jeffrey Herlings; Glenn Coldenhoff	2nd	18th
2019	(Netherlands) Assen	NED	MX2	Jeffrey Herlings; Glenn Coldenhoff	1st	2nd
2022	(United States) Red Bud	NED	Open	Glenn Coldenhoff; Kay de Wolf	7th	5th
2023	(France) Ernée	NED	MXGP	Kay de Wolf; Glenn Coldenhoff	19th	10th
2025	(United States) Ironman	NED	Open	Glenn Coldenhoff; Kay de Wolf	19th	12th

=== FIM Motocross World Championship ===
==== By season ====
Season	Class	Number	Motorcycle	Team	Race	Race Wins	Overall Wins	Race Top-3	Overall Podium	Pts	Plcd
2014	MX2	10	KTM	Bodo Schmidt KTM	4	0	0	0	0	18	32nd
2015	MX2	10	KTM	HSF Logistics Motorsports	4	0	0	0	0	39	30th
2016	MX2	10	KTM	HSF Logistics Motorsports	26	0	0	0	0	224	12th
2017	MX2	10	KTM	HSF Logistics Motorsports	26	0	0	0	1	261	13th
2018	MX2	10	Honda	Team HRC	39	2	1	9	5	543	6th
2019	MX2	10	Honda	Team HRC	24	1	0	7	4	399	8th
2020	MXGP	10	Yamaha	Team Gebben Van Venrooy Yamaha Racing	30	0	0	0	0	206	16th
2021	MXGP	10	Yamaha	Team Gebben Van Venrooy Yamaha Racing	26	0	0	0	0	203	14th
2022	MXGP	10	Yamaha	Team Gebben Van Venrooy Yamaha Racing	34	2	1	4	2	395	7th
2023	MXGP	10	Yamaha	Team Gebben Van Venrooy Yamaha Racing	37	1	0	2	0	599	6th
2024	MXGP	10	Yamaha	Monster Energy Yamaha Factory MXGP Team	31	0	0	6	2	550	7th
2025	MXGP	10	Yamaha	Monster Energy Yamaha Factory MXGP Team	39	0	0	6	3	582	6th
2026	MXGP	10	Ducati	Red Bull Ducati Factory MXGP Team	33	0	0	0	0	368	11th
Total					353	6	2	34	17	4387	

==== Grand Prix Wins ====
GP wins
Amount of GP-wins	Date	Grand Prix	Place
MX2-class
1	1 July 2018	Indonesia	Pangkal Pinang
MXGP-class
2	15 May 2022	Sardinia	Riola Sardo
