= 2025 Motocross des Nations =

2025 edition of Motocross des Nations

The 2025 Motocross des Nations was a Motocross race held on 4 and 5 October 2025 at Ironman Raceway.

This was the first time that the track near Crawfordsville, Indiana held the event and the sixth time that the event took place in the United States.

Australia went into the event as the reigning champions, after taking their first victory at the 2024 edition. Fielding the same team from the previous edition, the Australians were able to successfully defend their title.

== Entry list ==
Start numbers were allocated based on the team finishes from the 2024 competition. This allocated number plates 1, 2 & 3 to Australia (1st), 4, 5 & 6 to United States (2nd) and 7, 8 & 9 to The Netherlands (3rd).

The provisional entry for the event was released on 8 September.

	Country	Nr	Rider	Class	Motorcycle
1	Australia	1	Jett Lawrence	MXGP	Honda
1	Australia	2	Kyle Webster	MX2	Honda
1	Australia	3	Hunter Lawrence	Open	Honda
2	United States	4	Eli Tomac	MXGP	Yamaha
2	United States	5	Justin Cooper	MX2	Yamaha
2	United States	6	RJ Hampshire	Open	Husqvarna
3	The Netherlands	7	Glenn Coldenhoff	MXGP	Fantic
3	The Netherlands	8	Kay de Wolf	MX2	Husqvarna
3	The Netherlands	9	Calvin Vlaanderen	Open	Yamaha
4	Spain	10	Rubén Fernández	MXGP	Honda
4	Spain	11	Guillem Farrés	MX2	Triumph
4	Spain	12	Francisco García	Open	Kawasaki
5	France	13	Romain Febvre	MXGP	Kawasaki
5	France	14	Mathis Valin	MX2	Kawasaki
5	France	15	Maxime Renaux	Open	Yamaha
6	Germany	16	Ken Roczen	MXGP	Suzuki
6	Germany	17	Simon Längenfelder	MX2	KTM
6	Germany	18	Maximilian Spies	Open	KTM
7	Slovenia	19	Tim Gajser	MXGP	Honda
7	Slovenia	20	Jaka Peklaj	MX2	Husqvarna
7	Slovenia	21	Jan Pancar	Open	KTM
8	Italy	22	Tony Cairoli	MXGP	Ducati
8	Italy	23	Andrea Adamo	MX2	KTM
8	Italy	24	Andrea Bonacorsi	Open	Fantic
9	Switzerland	25	Jeremy Seewer	MXGP	Ducati
9	Switzerland	26	Nico Greutmann	MX2	Husqvarna
9	Switzerland	27	Valentin Guillod	Open	Yamaha
10	Latvia	28	Kārlis Reišulis	MXGP	Yamaha
10	Latvia	29	Jānis Reišulis	MX2	Yamaha
10	Latvia	30	Pauls Jonass	Open	Kawasaki
11	Denmark	31	Magnus Smith	MXGP	KTM
11	Denmark	32	Mikkel Haarup	MX2	Triumph
11	Denmark	33	Mads Fredsøe	Open	Husqvarna
12	United Kingdom	34	Josh Gilbert	MXGP	Honda
12	United Kingdom	35	Dylan Walsh	MX2	KTM
12	United Kingdom	36	Conrad Mewse	Open	Honda
13	Brazil	37	Enzo Lopes	MXGP	Yamaha
13	Brazil	38	Bernardo Tibúrcio	MX2	Honda
13	Brazil	39	Fábio Santos	Open	Yamaha
14	Canada	43	Jess Pettis	MXGP	Yamaha
14	Canada	44	Sébastien Racine	MX2	Yamaha
14	Canada	45	Tanner Ward	Open	Gas Gas
15	Belgium	46	Lucas Coenen	MXGP	KTM
15	Belgium	47	Sacha Coenen	MX2	KTM
15	Belgium	48	Liam Everts	Open	Husqvarna
16	Norway	49	Håkon Østerhagen	MXGP	KTM
16	Norway	50	Pelle Gundersen	MX2	Husqvarna
16	Norway	51	Håkon Fredriksen	Open	Yamaha
17	South Africa	52	Slade Smith	MXGP	Honda
17	South Africa	53	Camden McLellan	MX2	Triumph
17	South Africa	54	Cameron Durow	Open	KTM
18	Estonia	55	Jörgen-Matthias Talviku	MXGP	Yamaha
18	Estonia	56	Joosep Pärn	MX2	Gas Gas
18	Estonia	57	Harri Kullas	Open	Husqvarna
19	Austria	58	Pascal Rauchenecker	MXGP	Husqvarna
19	Austria	59	Maximilian Ernecker	MX2	KTM
19	Austria	60	Marcel Stauffer	Open	KTM
20	Sweden	61	Isak Gifting	MXGP	Yamaha
20	Sweden	62	Albin Gerhardsson	MX2	Husqvarna
20	Sweden	63	Alvin Östlund	Open	Triumph
21	(Republic of Ireland) Ireland	67	Martin Barr	MXGP	Honda
21	(Republic of Ireland) Ireland	68	Glenn McCormick	MX2	KTM
21	(Republic of Ireland) Ireland	69	Stuart Edmonds	Open	TM
22	Venezuela	70	Anthony Rodríguez	MXGP	KTM
22	Venezuela	71	Carlos Badiali	MX2	Yamaha
22	Venezuela	72	Lorenzo Locurcio	Open	Gas Gas
23	Finland	76	Jere Haavisto	MXGP	KTM
23	Finland	77	Saku Mansikkamäki	MX2	KTM
23	Finland	78	Kasimir Hindersson	Open	KTM
24	Japan	79	Yuki Okura	MXGP	Honda
24	Japan	80	Soya Nakajima	MX2	Yamaha
24	Japan	81	Jo Shimoda	Open	Honda
25	Chile	85	Matías Pavez	MXGP	KTM
25	Chile	86	Benjamín Garib	MX2	Honda
25	Chile	87	Hardy Muñoz	Open	Yamaha
26	FIM Latin America	91	(Dominican Republic) Franklin Nogueras	MXGP	Husqvarna
26	FIM Latin America	92	(Colombia) Miguel Ángel Rojas	MX2	KTM
26	FIM Latin America	93	(Bolivia) Marco Antezana	Open	Honda
27	Iceland	106	Ingvar Sverrir Einarsson	MXGP	KTM
27	Iceland	107	Eric Máni Guðmundsson	MX2	KTM
27	Iceland	108	Eiður Orri Pálmarsson	Open	Kawasaki
28	Argentina	109	Joaquín Poli	MXGP	Kawasaki
28	Argentina	110	Felipe Quirno Costa	MX2	KTM
28	Argentina	111	Agustín Poli	Open	Kawasaki
29	Puerto Rico	112	Sebastián Vélez	MXGP	Kawasaki
29	Puerto Rico	113	Ivan Aldama	MX2	Gas Gas
29	Puerto Rico	114	Rodny González	Open	Kawasaki
30	Uruguay	115	Nicolás Rolando	MXGP	KTM
30	Uruguay	116	Alfonso Bratschi	MX2	KTM
30	Uruguay	117	Germán Bratschi	Open	KTM
31	Morocco	118	Saad Soulimani	MXGP	TM
31	Morocco	119	Noam Jayal	MX2	Kawasaki
31	Morocco	120	Elies Poget	Open	KTM
32	Israel	121	Ofir Casey Tzemach	MXGP	Husqvarna
32	Israel	122	Stav Orland	MX2	Yamaha
32	Israel	123	Ben Almagor	Open	KTM
33	Ukraine	127	Yurii Naumchyk	MXGP	Kawasaki
33	Ukraine	128	Maksym Rososhchuk	MX2	KTM
33	Ukraine	129	Mykola Kubechko	Open	Husqvarna
34	Mexico	130	Yeissen Rubalcava	MXGP	Yamaha
34	Mexico	131	Erick Vázquez	MX2	Yamaha
34	Mexico	132	Jorge Rubalcava	Open	Husqvarna
35	Costa Rica	133	Yarod Vargas	MXGP	Gas Gas
35	Costa Rica	134	Abraham Alfaro	MX2	Gas Gas
35	Costa Rica	135	José Pablo Chaves	Open	Gas Gas
36	FIM Asia	136	(Thailand) Ben Hallgren	MXGP	Yamaha
36	FIM Asia	137	(Guam) Christopher Blackmer	MX2	Yamaha
36	FIM Asia	138	(Thailand) Jiraj Wannalak	Open	Honda
37	Honduras	139	José María Reyes	MXGP	Honda
37	Honduras	140	Gerhard Matamoros	MX2	KTM
37	Honduras	141	Fabio Hernández	Open	KTM

== Qualifying Races ==
Qualifying was run on a class by class basis. Top 19 countries after qualifying went directly to the main Motocross des Nations races. The remaining countries went to a smaller final. Best 2 scores counted.

=== MXGP ===
Place	Nr	Rider	Motorcycle	Laps	Gap
1	1	(Australia) Jett Lawrence	Honda	11	
2	16	(Germany) Ken Roczen	Suzuki	11	+8.277
3	13	(France) Romain Febvre	Kawasaki	11	+17.474
4	10	(Spain) Rubén Fernández	Honda	11	+19.399
5	19	(Slovenia) Tim Gajser	Honda	11	+23.550
6	46	(Belgium) Lucas Coenen	KTM	11	+29.282
7	61	(Sweden) Isak Gifting	Yamaha	11	+37.641
8	22	(Italy) Tony Cairoli	Ducati	11	+46.545
9	4	(United States) Eli Tomac	Yamaha	11	+49.904
10	25	(Switzerland) Jeremy Seewer	Ducati	11	+1:02.833
11	28	(Latvia) Kārlis Reišulis	Yamaha	11	+1:10.936
12	37	(Brazil) Enzo Lopes	Yamaha	11	+1:18.073
13	34	(United Kingdom) Josh Gilbert	Honda	11	+1:29.787
14	76	(Finland) Jere Haavisto	KTM	11	+1:39.447
15	49	(Norway) Håkon Østerhagen	KTM	11	+1:53.499
16	43	(Canada) Jess Pettis	Yamaha	11	+2:00.928
17	70	(Venezuela) Anthony Rodríguez	KTM	11	+2:02.731
18	118	(Morocco) Saad Soulimani	TM	11	+2:03.783
19	79	(Japan) Yuki Okura	Honda	11	+2:05.190
20	58	(Austria) Pascal Rauchenecker	Husqvarna	11	+2:11.111
21	52	(South Africa) Slade Smith	Honda	11	+2:11.201
22	109	(Argentina) Joaquín Poli	Kawasaki	10	+1 Lap
23	91	(Dominican Republic) Franklin Noguera	Husqvarna	10	+1 Lap
24	55	(Estonia) Jörgen-Matthias Talviku	Yamaha	10	+1 Lap
25	67	(Republic of Ireland) Martin Barr	Honda	10	+1 Lap
26	121	(Israel) Ofir Casey Tzemach	Husqvarna	10	+1 Lap
27	115	(Uruguay) Nicolás Rolando	KTM	10	+1 Lap
28	85	(Chile) Matías Pavez	KTM	10	+1 Lap
29	136	(Thailand) Ben Hallgren	Yamaha	10	+1 Lap
30	133	(Costa Rica) Yarod Vargas	Gas Gas	10	+1 Lap
31	130	(Mexico) Yeissen Rubalcava	Yamaha	10	+1 Lap
32	31	(Denmark) Magnus Smith	KTM	9	Did Not Finish
33	106	(Iceland) Ingvar Sverrir Einarsson	KTM	9	+2 Laps
34	7	(Netherlands) Glenn Coldenhoff	Fantic	8	Did Not Finish
35	127	(Ukraine) Yurii Naumchyk	Kawasaki	8	+3 Laps
36	112	(Puerto Rico) Sebastián Vélez	Kawasaki	6	Did Not Finish
37	139	(Honduras) José Maria Reyes	Honda	3	Did Not Finish

=== MX2 ===
Place	Nr	Rider	Motorcycle	Laps	Gap
1	47	(Belgium) Sacha Coenen	KTM	11	
2	8	(Netherlands) Kay de Wolf	Husqvarna	11	+2.891
3	5	(United States) Justin Cooper	Yamaha	11	+5.097
4	17	(Germany) Simon Längenfelder	KTM	11	+36.448
5	2	(Australia) Kyle Webster	Honda	11	+40.205
6	53	(South Africa) Camden McLellan	Triumph	11	+49.999
7	11	(Spain) Guillem Farrés	Triumph	11	+51.363
8	14	(France) Mathis Valin	Kawasaki	11	+52.036
9	29	(Latvia) Jānis Reišulis	Yamaha	11	+54.303
10	23	(Italy) Andrea Adamo	KTM	11	+55.143
11	32	(Denmark) Mikkel Haarup	Triumph	11	+1:01.689
12	62	(Sweden) Albin Gerhardsson	Husqvarna	11	+1:43.115
13	122	(Israel) Stav Orland	Yamaha	11	+1:44.383
14	80	(Japan) Soya Nakajima	Yamaha	11	+1:45.160
15	26	(Switzerland) Nico Greutmann	Husqvarna	11	+1:45.683
16	35	(United Kingdom) Dylan Walsh	Kawasaki	11	+1:50.653
17	44	(Canada) Sébastien Racine	Yamaha	11	+1:51.144
18	38	(Brazil) Bernardo Tibúrcio	Honda	11	+1:57.162
19	50	(Norway) Pelle Gundersen	Husqvarna	11	+2:08.894
20	77	(Finland) Saku Mansikkamäki	KTM	11	+2:10.447
21	20	(Slovenia) Jaka Peklaj	Husqvarna	11	+2:10.826
22	113	(Puerto Rico) Ivan Aldama	Gas Gas	10	+1 Lap
23	59	(Austria) Maximilian Ernecker	KTM	10	+1 Lap
24	137	(Guam) Christopher Blackmer	Yamaha	10	+1 Lap
25	71	(Venezuela) Carlos Badiali	Yamaha	10	+1 Lap
26	140	(Honduras) Gerhard Matamoros	KTM	10	+1 Lap
27	110	(Argentina) Felipe Quirno Costa	KTM	10	+1 Lap
28	134	(Costa Rica) Abraham Alfaro	Gas Gas	10	+1 Lap
29	119	(Morocco) Noam Jayal	Kawasaki	10	+1 Lap
30	92	(Colombia) Miguel Ángel Rojas	KTM	10	+1 Lap
31	131	(Mexico) Erick Vázquez	Yamaha	10	+1 Lap
32	68	(Republic of Ireland) Glenn McCormick	KTM	6	Did Not Finish
33	128	(Ukraine) Maksym Rososhchuk	KTM	4	Did Not Finish
34	86	(Chile) Benjamín Garib	Honda	1	Did Not Finish
35	116	(Uruguay) Alfonso Bratschi	KTM	0	Did Not Finish
36	107	(Iceland) Eric Máni Guðmundsson	KTM	10	5 Place Penalty
	56	(Estonia) Joosep Pärn	Gas Gas	10	Disqualified

=== Open ===
Place	Nr	Rider	Motorcycle	Laps	Gap
1	3	(Australia) Hunter Lawrence	Honda	11	
2	81	(Japan) Jo Shimoda	Honda	11	+8.266
3	9	(Netherlands) Calvin Vlaanderen	Yamaha	11	+14.614
4	6	(United States) RJ Hampshire	Husqvarna	11	+18.703
5	48	(Belgium) Liam Everts	Husqvarna	11	+22.012
6	24	(Italy) Andrea Bonacorsi	Fantic	11	+26.542
7	15	(France) Maxime Renaux	Yamaha	11	+28.526
8	27	(Switzerland) Valentin Guillod	Yamaha	11	+35.766
9	30	(Latvia) Pauls Jonass	Kawasaki	11	+39.062
10	21	(Slovenia) Jan Pancar	KTM	11	+43.103
11	57	(Estonia) Harri Kullas	Yamaha	11	+46.243
12	51	(Norway) Håkon Fredriksen	Yamaha	11	+58.290
13	72	(Venezuela) Lorenzo Locurcio	Gas Gas	11	+1:00.098
14	63	(Sweden) Alvin Östlund	Triumph	11	+1:02.864
15	12	(Spain) Francisco García	Kawasaki	11	+42.545
16	36	(United Kingdom) Conrad Mewse	Honda	11	+1:06.004
17	60	(Austria) Marcel Stauffer	KTM	11	+1:12.713
18	39	(Brazil) Fábio Santos	Yamaha	11	+1:24.137
19	54	(South Africa) Cameron Durow	KTM	11	+1:28.292
20	33	(Denmark) Mads Fredsøe	Husqvarna	11	+1:31.788
21	18	(Germany) Maximilian Spies	KTM	11	+1:37.643
22	87	(Chile) Hardy Muñoz	Yamaha	11	+1:43.804
23	45	(Canada) Tanner Ward	Gas Gas	11	+1:51.887
24	78	(Finland) Kasimir Hindersson	KTM	11	+2:17.862
25	93	(Bolivia) Marco Antezana	Honda	10	+1 Lap
26	117	(Uruguay) Germán Bratschi	KTM	10	+1 Lap
27	69	(Republic of Ireland) Stuart Edmonds	TM	10	+1 Lap
28	111	(Argentina) Agustín Poli	Kawasaki	10	+1 Lap
29	135	(Costa Rica) José Pablo Chaves	Gas Gas	10	+1 Lap
30	123	(Israel) Ben Almagor	KTM	10	+1 Lap
31	120	(Morocco) Elies Poget	KTM	10	+1 Lap
32	108	(Iceland) Eiður Orri Pálmarsson	Yamaha	10	+1 Lap
33	132	(Mexico) Jorge Rubalcava	Husqvarna	10	+1 Lap
34	138	(Thailand) Jiraj Wannalak	Honda	10	+1 Lap
35	141	(Honduras) Fabio Hernández	KTM	9	+2 Laps
36	114	(Puerto Rico) Rodny González	Kawasaki	9	+2 Laps
37	129	(Ukraine) Petro Zavorytskyi	KTM	8	+3 Laps

=== Qualification Standings ===
- Qualified Nations

Place	Nation	Points
1	Australia	2
2	Netherlands	5
3	Belgium	6
4	Germany	6
5	USA	7
6	France	10
7	Spain	11
8	Italy	14
9	Slovenia	15
10	Japan	16
11	Latvia	18
12	Switzerland	18
13	Sweden	19
14	South Africa	25
15	Norway	27
16	United Kingdom	29
17	Brazil	30
18	Venezuela	30
19	Denmark	31

- Nations admitted to the B-Final

Place	Nation	Points
20	Canada	33
21	Finland	34
22	Estonia	35
23	Austria	37
24	Israel	39
25	Morocco	47
26	FIM Latin America	48
27	Argentina	49
28	Chile	50
29	Ireland	52
30	FIM Asia	53
31	Uruguay	53

- Nations admitted to the C-Final

Place	Nation	Points
32	Costa Rica	57
33	Puerto Rico	58
34	Honduras	61
35	Mexico	62
36	Iceland	65
37	Ukraine	68

== C-Final ==
The C-Final was for the nations who finished 32nd-37th in qualifying. The top nation from the C-Final qualify for the B-Final, the remaining are eliminated. Best 2 scores for each nation counts.

=== Race ===
Place	Nr	Rider	Motorcycle	Laps	Gap
1	133	(Costa Rica) Yarod Vargas	Gas Gas	10	
2	135	(Costa Rica) José Pablo Chaves	Gas Gas	10	+2.686
3	132	(Mexico) Jorge Rubalcava	Husqvarna	10	+3.370
4	108	(Iceland) Eiður Orri Pálmarsson	Yamaha	10	+25.762
5	134	(Costa Rica) Abraham Alfaro	Gas Gas	10	+50.820
6	130	(Mexico) Yeissen Rubalcava	Yamaha	10	+1:23.434
7	131	(Mexico) Erick Vázquez	Yamaha	10	+1:36.920
8	107	(Iceland) Eric Máni Guðmundsson	KTM	10	+1:50.002
9	114	(Puerto Rico) Rodny González	Kawasaki	10	+2:05.909
10	106	(Iceland) Ingvar Sverrir Einarsson	KTM	10	+2:13.317
11	127	(Ukraine) Yurii Naumchyk	Kawasaki	10	+2:18.484
12	141	(Honduras) Fabio Hernández	KTM	10	+2:26.426
13	128	(Ukraine) Maksym Rososhchuk	KTM	9	+1 Lap
14	129	(Ukraine) Petro Zavorytskyi	KTM	9	+1 Lap
15	113	(Puerto Rico) Ivan Aldama	Gas Gas	5	Did Not Finish
16	112	(Puerto Rico) Sebastián Veléz	Kawasaki	3	Did Not Finish
	140	(Honduras) Gerhard Matamoros	KTM	10	Disqualified
	139	(Honduras) José Maria Reyes	Honda	0	Did Not Start

=== C-Final Standings ===
- Costa Rica qualify for the B-Final.

Place	Nation	Points
1	Costa Rica	3
2	Mexico	9
3	Iceland	12
4	Puerto Rico	24
5	Ukraine	24
6	Honduras	12

== B-Final ==
The B-Final is for the nations who finished 20th-32nd in qualifying. The top nation from the B-Final qualify for the main Motocross des Nations races, the remaining are eliminated. Best 2 scores for each nation counts.

=== Race ===
Place	Nr	Rider	Motorcycle	Laps	Gap
1	43	(Canada) Jess Pettis	Yamaha	11	
2	57	(Estonia) Harri Kullas	Yamaha	11	+4.736
3	60	(Austria) Marcel Stauffer	KTM	11	+8.985
4	55	(Estonia) Jörgen-Matthias Talviku	Yamaha	11	+15.290
5	76	(Finland) Jere Haavisto	KTM	11	+30.757
6	58	(Austria) Pascal Rauchenecker	Husqvarna	11	+40.235
7	86	(Chile) Benjamín Garib	Honda	11	+43.066
8	109	(Argentina) Joaquín Poli	Kawasaki	11	+44.695
9	44	(Canada) Sébastien Racine	Yamaha	11	+45.614
10	118	(Morocco) Saad Soulimani	TM	11	+59.312
11	122	(Israel) Stav Orland	Yamaha	11	+1:04.079
12	78	(Finland) Kasimir Hindersson	KTM	11	+1:14.627
13	45	(Canada) Tanner Ward	Gas Gas	11	+1:16.543
14	85	(Chile) Matías Pavez	KTM	11	+1:22.700
15	117	(Uruguay) Germán Bratschi	KTM	11	+1:26.109
16	59	(Austria) Maximilian Ernecker	KTM	11	+1:28.535
17	68	(Republic of Ireland) Glenn McCormick	KTM	11	+1:36.188
18	137	(Guam) Christopher Blackmer	Yamaha	11	+1:21.838
19	115	(Uruguay) Nicolás Rolando	KTM	11	+1:20.181
20	91	(Dominican Republic) Franklin Noguera	Husqvarna	11	+1:37.237
21	138	(Thailand) Jiraj Wannalak	Honda	11	+1:40.368
22	93	(Bolivia) Marco Antezana	Honda	11	+1:42.109
23	67	(Republic of Ireland) Martin Barr	Honda	11	+1:45.629
24	69	(Republic of Ireland) Stuart Edmonds	TM	11	+1:46.961
25	121	(Israel) Ofir Casey Tzemach	Husqvarna	11	+1:51.690
26	56	(Estonia) Joosep Pärn	Gas Gas	11	+1:51.734
27	77	(Finland) Saku Mansikkamäki	KTM	11	+2:00.517
28	123	(Israel) Ben Almagor	KTM	11	+2:09.438
29	110	(Argentina) Felipe Quirno Costa	KTM	11	+2:18.338
30	135	(Costa Rica) José Pablo Chaves	Gas Gas	10	+1 Lap
31	136	(Thailand) Ben Hallgren	Yamaha	10	+1 Lap
32	120	(Morocco) Elies Poget	KTM	10	+1 Lap
33	116	(Uruguay) Alfonso Bratschi	KTM	10	+1 Lap
34	111	(Argentina) Agustín Poli	Kawasaki	10	+1 Lap
35	92	(Colombia) Miguel Ángel Rojas	KTM	10	+1 Lap
36	133	(Costa Rica) Yarod Vargas	Gas Gas	10	+1 Lap
37	134	(Costa Rica) Abraham Alfaro	Gas Gas	7	Did Not Finish
38	119	(Morocco) Noam Jayal	Kawasaki	5	Did Not Finish
39	87	(Chile) Hardy Muñoz	Yamaha	4	Did Not Finish

=== B-Final Standings ===
- Estonia qualify for the main races.

Place	Nation	Points
1	Estonia	6
2	Austria	9
3	Canada	10
4	Finland	17
5	Chile	21
6	Uruguay	34
7	Israel	36
8	Argentina	37
9	FIM Asia	39
10	Ireland	40
11	FIM Latin America	42
12	Morocco	42
13	Costa Rica	66

== Motocross des Nations races ==
The main Motocross des Nations races consist of 3 races which combine two classes together in each. Lowest score wins with each nation allowed to drop their worst score after the final race.

=== MXGP+MX2 ===
Place	Nr	Rider	Motorcycle	Laps	Gap
1	1	(Australia) Jett Lawrence	Honda	16	
2	46	(Belgium) Lucas Coenen	KTM	16	+7.012
3	19	(Slovenia) Tim Gajser	Honda	16	+17.417
4	4	(United States) Eli Tomac	Yamaha	16	+19.361
5	13	(France) Romain Febvre	Kawasaki	16	+37.927
6	10	(Spain) Rubén Fernández	Honda	16	+55.921
7	61	(Sweden) Isak Gifting	Yamaha	16	+59.758
8	8	(Netherlands) Kay de Wolf	Husqvarna	16	+1:00.895
9	14	(France) Mathis Valin	Kawasaki	16	+1:01.052
10	5	(United States) Justin Cooper	Yamaha	16	+1:24.233
11	25	(Switzerland) Jeremy Seewer	Ducati	16	+1:27.241
12	23	(Italy) Andrea Adamo	KTM	16	+1:30.718
13	53	(South Africa) Camden McLellan	Triumph	16	+1:34.175
14	37	(Brazil) Enzo Lopes	Yamaha	16	+1:45.758
15	2	(Australia) Kyle Webster	Honda	16	+1:51.319
16	11	(Spain) Guillem Farrés	Triumph	16	+1:54.228
17	32	(Denmark) Mikkel Haarup	Triumph	16	+1:54.802
18	16	(Germany) Ken Roczen	Suzuki	16	+2:00.121
19	28	(Latvia) Kārlis Reišulis	Yamaha	16	+2:08.120
20	47	(Belgium) Sacha Coenen	KTM	15	Did Not Finish
21	55	(Estonia) Jörgen-Matthias Talviku	Yamaha	15	+1 Lap
22	34	(United Kingdom) Josh Gilbert	Honda	15	+1 Lap
23	70	(Venezuela) Anthony Rodríguez	KTM	15	+1 Lap
24	26	(Switzerland) Nico Greutmann	Husqvarna	15	+1 Lap
25	22	(Italy) Tony Cairoli	Ducati	15	+1 Lap
26	38	(Brazil) Bernardo Tibúrcio	Honda	15	+1 Lap
27	29	(Latvia) Jānis Reišulis	Yamaha	15	+1 Lap
28	62	(Sweden) Albin Gerhardsson	Husqvarna	15	+1 Lap
29	50	(Norway) Pelle Gundersen	Husqvarna	15	+1 Lap
30	56	(Estonia) Joosep Pärn	Gas Gas	15	+1 Lap
31	79	(Japan) Yuki Okura	Honda	15	+1 Lap
32	49	(Norway) Håkon Østerhagen	KTM	14	+2 Laps
33	20	(Slovenia) Jaka Peklaj	Husqvarna	14	+2 Laps
34	71	(Venezuela) Carlos Badiali	Yamaha	14	+2 Laps
35	52	(South Africa) Slade Smith	Honda	14	+2 Laps
36	80	(Japan) Soya Nakajima	Yamaha	14	+2 Laps
37	35	(United Kingdom) Dylan Walsh	Kawasaki	14	+2 Laps
38	17	(Germany) Simon Längenfelder	KTM	0	Did Not Finish
	7	(Netherlands) Glenn Coldenhoff	Fantic	0	Did Not Start
	31	(Denmark) Magnus Smith	KTM	0	Did Not Start

=== Nations standings after Race 1 ===
Place	Nation	Points
1	United States	14
2	France	14
3	Australia	16
4	Belgium	22
5	Spain	22
6	Sweden	35
7	Switzerland	35
8	Slovenia	36
9	Italy	37
10	Brazil	40
11	Latvia	46
12	South Africa	48
13	Estonia	51
14	Germany	56
15	Venezuela	57
16	United Kingdom	59
17	Norway	61
18	Japan	67
19	Netherlands	8
20	Denmark	17

=== MX2+Open ===
Place	Nr	Rider	Motorcycle	Laps	Gap
1	3	(Australia) Hunter Lawrence	Honda	16	
2	81	(Japan) Jo Shimoda	Honda	16	+9.479
3	21	(Slovenia) Jan Pancar	KTM	16	+14.927
4	48	(Belgium) Liam Everts	Husqvarna	16	+16.474
5	15	(France) Maxime Renaux	Yamaha	16	+20.396
6	24	(Italy) Andrea Bonacorsi	Fantic	16	+22.240
7	6	(United States) RJ Hampshire	Husqvarna	16	+24.706
8	8	(Netherlands) Kay de Wolf	Husqvarna	16	+34.174
9	9	(Netherlands) Calvin Vlaanderen	Yamaha	16	+39.584
10	5	(United States) Justin Cooper	Yamaha	16	+45.153
11	30	(Latvia) Pauls Jonass	Kawasaki	16	+46.840
12	23	(Italy) Andrea Adamo	KTM	16	+52.275
13	2	(Australia) Kyle Webster	Honda	16	+1:08.285
14	14	(France) Mathis Valin	Kawasaki	16	+1:11.243
15	32	(Denmark) Mikkel Haarup	Triumph	16	+1:14.525
16	11	(Spain) Guillem Farrés	Triumph	16	+1:17.703
17	29	(Latvia) Jānis Reišulis	Yamaha	16	+1:23.613
18	53	(South Africa) Camden McLellan	Triumph	16	+1:27.075
19	57	(Estonia) Harri Kullas	Yamaha	16	+1:28.870
20	63	(Sweden) Alvin Östlund	Triumph	16	+1:29.056
21	47	(Belgium) Sacha Coenen	KTM	16	+1:43.157
22	18	(Germany) Maximilian Spies	KTM	16	+1:47.435
23	36	(United Kingdom) Conrad Mewse	Honda	16	+1:48.549
24	26	(Switzerland) Nico Greutmann	Husqvarna	16	+1:57.740
25	38	(Brazil) Bernardo Tibúrcio	Honda	16	+2:09.063
26	12	(Spain) Francisco García	Kawasaki	16	+1:07.080
27	54	(South Africa) Cameron Durow	KTM	16	+2:11.847
28	39	(Brazil) Fábio Santos	Yamaha	15	+1 Lap
29	62	(Sweden) Albin Gerhardsson	Husqvarna	15	+1 Lap
30	56	(Estonia) Joosep Pärn	Gas Gas	15	+1 Lap
31	80	(Japan) Soya Nakajima	Yamaha	15	+1 Lap
32	71	(Venezuela) Carlos Badiali	Yamaha	15	+1 Lap
33	50	(Norway) Pelle Gundersen	Husqvarna	12	+4 Laps
34	72	(Venezuela) Lorenzo Locurcio	Gas Gas	9	Did Not Finish
35	27	(Switzerland) Valentin Guillod	Yamaha	7	Did Not Finish
36	51	(Norway) Håkon Fredriksen	Yamaha	3	Did Not Finish
37	20	(Slovenia) Jaka Peklaj	Husqvarna	15	+1 Lap
38	33	(Denmark) Mads Fredsøe	Husqvarna	0	Did Not Finish
39	35	(United Kingdom) Dylan Walsh	Kawasaki	0	Did Not Finish
	17	(Germany) Simon Längenfelder	KTM	0	Did Not Start

=== Nations standings after Race 2 ===
Place	Nation	Points
1	Australia	30
2	United States	31
3	France	33
4	Belgium	47
5	Italy	55
6	Spain	64
7	Latvia	74
8	Slovenia	76
9	Sweden	84
10	South Africa	93
11	Brazil	93
12	Switzerland	94
13	Japan	100
14	Estonia	100
15	United Kingdom	121
16	Venezuela	123
17	Norway	130
18	Netherlands	25
19	Denmark	70
20	Germany	78

=== MXGP+Open ===
Place	Nr	Rider	Motorcycle	Laps	Gap
1	3	(Australia) Hunter Lawrence	Honda	16	
2	4	(United States) Eli Tomac	Yamaha	16	+5.730
3	1	(Australia) Jett Lawrence	Honda	16	+14.058
4	19	(Slovenia) Tim Gajser	Honda	16	+18.301
5	13	(France) Romain Febvre	Kawasaki	16	+24.503
6	81	(Japan) Jo Shimoda	Honda	16	+26.668
7	48	(Belgium) Liam Everts	Husqvarna	16	+29.318
8	61	(Sweden) Isak Gifting	Yamaha	16	+31.171
9	15	(France) Maxime Renaux	Yamaha	16	+35.237
10	46	(Belgium) Lucas Coenen	KTM	16	+47.099
11	27	(Switzerland) Valentin Guillod	Yamaha	16	+48.465
12	16	(Germany) Ken Roczen	Suzuki	16	+1:04.930
13	22	(Italy) Tony Cairoli	Ducati	16	+1:07.678
14	21	(Slovenia) Jan Pancar	KTM	16	+1:10.506
15	24	(Italy) Andrea Bonacorsi	Fantic	16	+1:11.577
16	25	(Switzerland) Jeremy Seewer	Ducati	16	+1:12.398
17	30	(Latvia) Pauls Jonass	Kawasaki	16	+1:26.057
18	36	(United Kingdom) Conrad Mewse	Honda	16	+1:34.481
19	37	(Brazil) Enzo Lopes	Yamaha	16	+1:45.997
20	57	(Estonia) Harri Kullas	Yamaha	16	+1:48.669
21	63	(Sweden) Alvin Östlund	Triumph	16	+1:50.124
22	55	(Estonia) Jörgen-Matthias Talviku	Yamaha	16	+1:51.282
23	34	(United Kingdom) Josh Gilbert	Honda	16	+1:58.373
24	28	(Latvia) Kārlis Reišulis	Yamaha	16	+2:02.616
25	12	(Spain) Francisco García	Kawasaki	15	+1 Lap
26	39	(Brazil) Fábio Santos	Yamaha	15	+1 Lap
27	54	(South Africa) Cameron Durow	KTM	15	+1 Lap
28	70	(Venezuela) Anthony Rodríguez	KTM	15	+1 Lap
29	79	(Japan) Yuki Okura	Honda	15	+1 Lap
30	18	(Germany) Maximilian Spies	KTM	15	+1 Lap
31	52	(South Africa) Slade Smith	Honda	15	+1 Lap
32	49	(Norway) Håkon Østerhagen	KTM	15	+1 Lap
33	6	(United States) RJ Hampshire	Husqvarna	9	Did Not Finish
34	10	(Spain) Rubén Fernández	Honda	4	Did Not Finish
35	9	(Netherlands) Calvin Vlaanderen	Yamaha	2	Did Not Finish
36	51	(Norway) Håkon Fredriksen	Yamaha	0	Did Not Finish
37	33	(Denmark) Mads Fredsøe	Husqvarna	0	Did Not Finish
	7	(Netherlands) Glenn Coldenhoff	Fantic	0	Did Not Start
	31	(Denmark) Magnus Smith	KTM	0	Did Not Start
	72	(Venezuela) Lorenzo Locurcio	Gas Gas	0	Did Not Start

=== Nations standings after Race 3 ===
Place	Nation	Points
1	Australia	19
2	United States	33
3	France	33
4	Belgium	43
5	Slovenia	57
6	Italy	58
7	Sweden	84
8	Switzerland	86
9	Latvia	88
10	Spain	89
11	Japan	99
12	Brazil	110
13	Estonia	112
14	South Africa	116
15	Germany	120
16	United Kingdom	123
17	Venezuela	151
18	Norway	162
19	Netherlands	60
20	Denmark	107

== Final standings ==
Place	Nation	Points	Total	Change
1	Australia	1 + 1 + 1 + 3 + 13	19	-
2	United States	2 + 4 + 7 + 10 + 10	33	-
3	France	5 + 5 + 5 + 9 + 9	33	+2
4	Belgium	2 + 4 + 7 + 10 + 20	43	+12
5	Slovenia	3 + 3 + 4 + 14 + 33	57	+2
6	Italy	6 + 12 + 12 + 13 + 15	58	+2
7	Sweden	7 + 8 + 20 + 21 + 28	84	+14
8	Switzerland	11 + 11 + 16 + 24 + 24	86	+1
9	Latvia	11 + 17 + 17 + 19 + 24	88	+1
10	Spain	6 + 16 + 16 + 25 + 26	89	-6
11	Japan	2 + 6 + 29 + 31 + 31	99	+16
12	Brazil	14 + 19 + 25 + 26 + 26	110	+1
13	Estonia	19 + 20 + 21 + 22 + 30	112	+6
14	South Africa	13 + 18 + 27 + 27 + 31	116	+4
15	Germany	12 + 18 + 22 + 30 + 38	120	-9
16	United Kingdom	18 + 22 + 23 + 23 + 37	123	-4
17	Venezuela	23 + 28 + 32 + 34 + 34	151	+7
18	Norway	29 + 32 + 32 + 33 + 36	162	-1
19	Netherlands	8 + 8 + 9 + 35	60	-16
20	Denmark	15 + 17 + 37 + 38	107	-9
21	Austria			-1
22	Canada			-7
23	Finland			+3
24	Chile			+5
25	Uruguay			*
26	Israel			*
27	Argentina			*
28	FIM Asia			*
29	Ireland			-6
30	FIM Latin America			+1
31	Morocco			*
32	Costa Rica			*
33	Mexico			*
34	Iceland			+2
35	Ukraine			*
36	Puerto Rico			*
37	Honduras			*
