= Kay de Wolf =

Dutch motocross racer

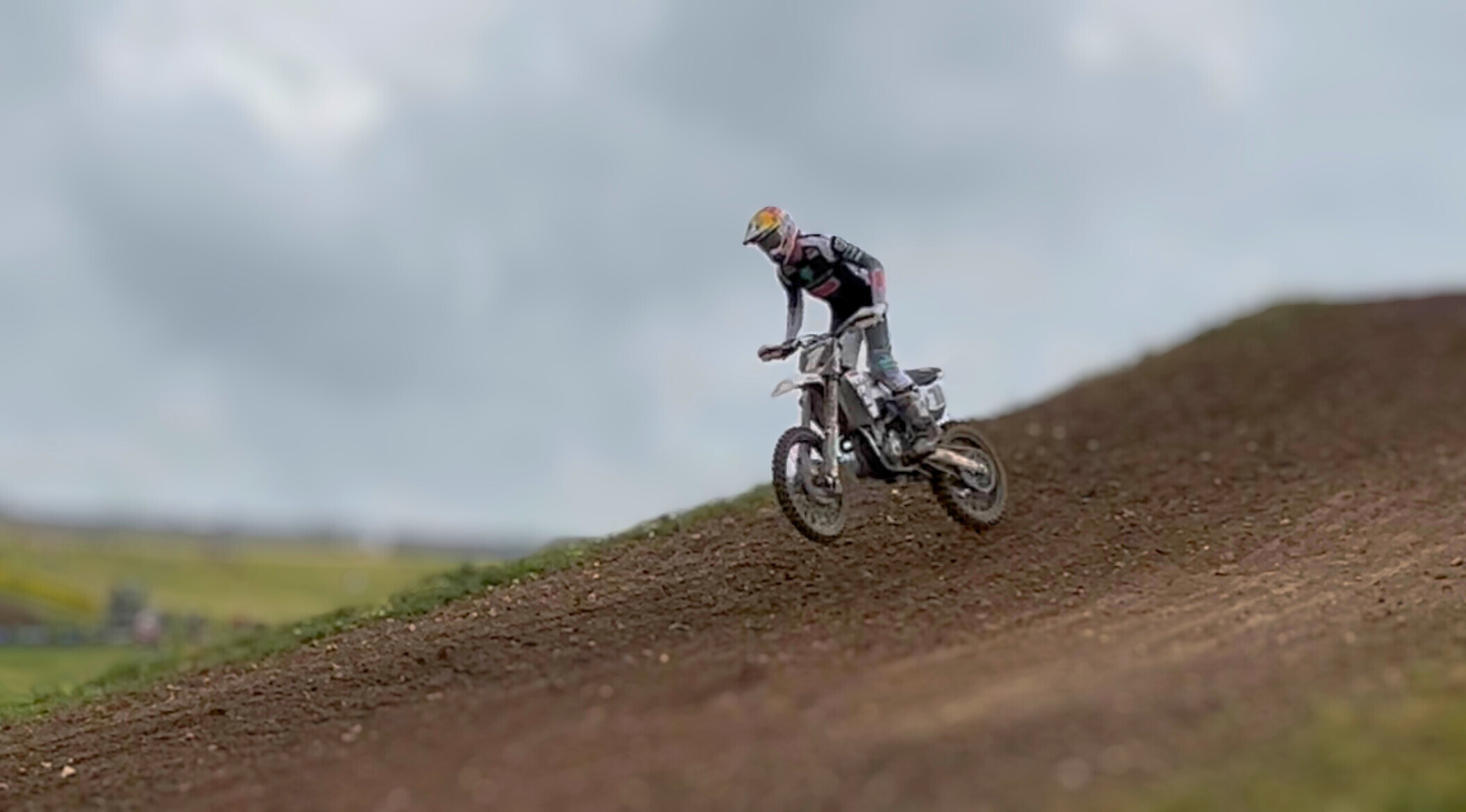
- de Wolf in 2025
- Nationality: (Netherlands) Dutch
- Born: 29 September 2004 (age 22) Valkenswaard, Netherlands

Motocross career
- Years active: 2021–present
- Teams: •Nestaan Husqvarna Factory Racing (2019–present)
- Championships: •2024 MX2
- Wins: •MX2: 15
- GP debut: 2021, GP of Russia, MX2
- First GP win: 2023, GP of Latvia, MX2

Kay de Wolf (born 29 September 2004) is a Dutch professional Motocross racer. He's competed in the Motocross World Championships since 2021. De Wolf was the 2024 FIM Motocross World Champion in the MX2 class.

De Wolf has competed for Husqvarna's factory team for the entirety of his World Championship career to date, transitioning to the 450cc motorcycle in the MXGP class with them in the 2026 season.

De Wolf won his first Grand Prix in Latvia in 2023 and has represented Netherlands three times at the Motocross des Nations. de Wolf's most recent appearance at the event was in 2025. In the 2024 edition he was part of the team that finished third overall. In addition, he won his individual class overall at both the 2024 and 2025 events.

Domestically, De Wolf is a two-time champion in the Dutch Masters of Motocross series.

== Career ==
=== Junior career ===
In 2017, De Wolf finished seventh overall in the 85cc class in the FIM Motocross Junior World Championship. de Wolf was able to finish second in the 85cc class in both the 2018 and World Championship in 2018. A crash in the first race meant that De Wolf's second race win was not enough for the title in the European Championship, whilst a 2–6 scorecard placed him in the runner-up spot in the World Championship.

On the back of his results aboard an 85, De Wolf was signed by Husqvarna Motorcycles to compete aboard a 125 in the 2019 European Motocross Championship. de Wolf would immediately show his sand riding skills by placing second in race two at round one of the series. His first overall podium would come at the second round of the series, with sixth overall being his final championship position. Being more of a sand specialist, the hardpack terrain in Italy for that year's Junior World Championship would see him finish thirteenth overall in the 125 class. Domestically, De Wolf won his first Dutch Masters of Motocross title in the 125 class.

=== 250 career ===
Continuing his rapid rise up the ranks, De Wolf moved up to the EMX250 class in 2020. He again proved himself to be able to adapt to the new class quickly, finishing fourth in the final standings and picking up two overall podiums.

After these results across the European Championships, de Wolf joined Husqvarna's factory team in the MX2 class of the 2021 FIM Motocross World Championship. De Wolf was immediately a top-ten finisher on debut and by round four recorded his first pole position, race top-three and overall podium at Oss. Two rounds later, once again in sandy conditions in Lommel, De Wolf recorded his second pole position. This was followed up by a third place in race one and taking a start-to-finish victory in race two, for second overall. The rest of the season saw De Wolf finish consistently in the top-ten and pick up two more podiums on the way to seventh in the final standings.

De Wolf repeated his race win at Lommel the following year. Once again, it was good enough for second overall at that Grand Prix, which was accompanied by 3 other podiums across the season. He missed three Grand Prix due to a hand injury sustained from being hit by a motorist whilst cycling. Sixth in the final MX2 standings was followed by his debut for Netherlands at the 2022 Motocross des Nations. He went on to win his first Grand Prix overall during the 2023 season in Latvia, winning both races in the process. This allowed him to become the leader of the World Championship for this first time in his career. This lead would only last one round however, with an ankle injury sustained in a training crash meaning that he lost the lead at the following round. He continued to race with the injury due to his championship position, but a heavy fall in training leading up to the Belgian round caused him to miss the following four rounds and drop out of contention. De Wolf returned for the final two rounds of the season, wrapping up sixth in the final standings and competing in the 2023 Motocross des Nations. Domestically, De Wolf became Dutch Masters of Motocross champion in the 250 class.

De Wolf carried on his championship-leading pre-injury form into the 2024 FIM Motocross World Championship, winning the first three Grand Prix of the season. This would set up a season-long battle with his teammate Lucas Coenen for the title in the MX2 class. Despite several notable crashes for De Wolf and a fierce rivalry with Coenen, he took four further overall wins and clinched his first world championship at the final round in Spain. Following this, he represented his country at the 2024 Motocross des Nations where Netherlands finished third overall as a team and he won the MX2 class individually. A week later, he raced in the final round of the Dutch National Motocross Championship in the MX1 class, where he won the opening race ahead of five-time world champion Jeffrey Herlings. De Wolf started his MX2 class championship defence by winning the opening round of the 2025 FIM Motocross World Championship in Argentina. He then became locked in a championship battle with Simon Längenfelder and 2023 champion Andrea Adamo, with Längenfelder proving the most consistent of the three. After taking two further Grand Prix wins in Sardinia and Spain, De Wolf would leave the twelfth round in Great Britain with a deficit of seventy points to the German. Over the final seven rounds, he would win four Grand Prix and close the gap down to single figures at the final round, before missing out on the title and finishing as runner-up in the standings by just nine points. At the 2025 Motocross des Nations, de Wolf again won the MX2 class individually, in an event where his team's overall results were hampered by an injury for Glenn Coldenhoff.

=== 450 career ===
For the 2026 FIM Motocross World Championship, de Wolf moved up to the MXGP class, aboard Husqvarna's 450cc motorcycle. He would miss the opening round of the series due to a thumb injury picked up a pre-season international. Upon his return, de Wolf was able to adapt to class quickly, scoring his first overall podium at the fourth round in Sardinia. A second podium followed in Latvia at the eighth round but a crash in qualifying at the next round in Italy caused an ankle injury, ruling him out for three mid-season grand prix. Returning again at the Czech round, de Wolf would pick up two further podiums in the sand at the Belgian and Dutch rounds, challenging eventual champion Jeffrey Herlings at the second of these. After his home round, de Wolf picked up his third injury of the year, when a practice crash caused a hand injury that ultimately ended his season.

== Honours ==
Motocross des Nations

- Team Overall: 2024 (bronze)
- Individual Overall - MX2: 2024 & 2025 (gold)

FIM Motocross World Championship

- MX2: 2024 (gold) , 2025 (silver)

FIM Motocross Junior World Championship

- 85cc: 2018 (silver)

European Motocross Championship

- 85cc: 2018 (silver)

Dutch Masters of Motocross

- 250cc: 2023 (gold)
- 125cc: 2019 (gold)

== MXGP Results ==
Year	Rnd 1	Rnd 2	Rnd 3	Rnd 4	Rnd 5	Rnd 6	Rnd 7	Rnd 8	Rnd 9	Rnd 10	Rnd 11	Rnd 12	Rnd 13	Rnd 14	Rnd 15	Rnd 16	Rnd 17	Rnd 18	Rnd 19	Rnd 20	Average Finish	Podium Percent	Place
2021 MX2	16	13	9	3	8	2	9	7	9	3	6	13	12	6	11	7	5	3	-	-	7.89	22%	7th
2022 MX2	4	3	17	4	2	4	5	OUT	OUT	OUT	11	15	6	2	6	2	11	4	-	-	6.40	27%	6th
2023 MX2	8	2	3	5	2	4	5	1	11	10	6	3	Ret	OUT	OUT	OUT	OUT	4	4	-	4.85	36%	6th
2024 MX2	1 ARG (Argentina)	1 ESP (Spain)	1 SAR (Sardinia)	4 TRE	4 POR (Portugal)	4 GAL	2 FRA (France)	2 GER (Germany)	4 LAT (Latvia)	7 ITA (Italy)	1 WNT (West Nusa Tenggara)	5 LOM (West Nusa Tenggara)	1 CZE (Czech Republic)	1 FLA (Flanders)	5 SWE (Sweden)	2 NED (Netherlands)	1 SUI (Switzerland)	2 TUR (Turkey)	2 CHN (China)	4 CAS	2.70	60%	1st
2025 MX2	1 ARG (Argentina)	2 CAS	5 EUR (Europe)	1 SAR (Sardinia)	2 TRE	3 SUI (Switzerland)	2 POR (Portugal)	1 ESP (Spain)	13 FRA (France)	3 GER (Germany)	3 LAT (Latvia)	10 GBR (United Kingdom)	1 FIN (Finland)	5 CZE (Czech Republic)	1 FLA (Flanders)	2 SWE (Sweden)	1 NED (Netherlands)	2 TUR (Turkey)	4 CHN (China)	1 AUS (Australia)	3.15	75%	2nd
2026 MXGP	OUT ARG (Argentina)	7 AND (Andalusia)	4 SUI (Switzerland)	3 SAR (Sardinia)	4 TRE	4 FRA (France)	5 GER (Germany)	2 LAT (Latvia)	OUT ITA (Italy)	OUT POR (Portugal)	OUT RSA (South Africa)	OUT GBR (United Kingdom)	14 CZE (Czech Republic)	2 FLA (Flanders)	8 SWE (Sweden)	2 NED (Netherlands)	OUT TUR (Turkey)	OUT CHN (China)	OUT AUS (Australia)	-	5.00	36%	10th
