= Andrea Adamo (motocross racer) =

Italian motorcycle racer (born 2003)

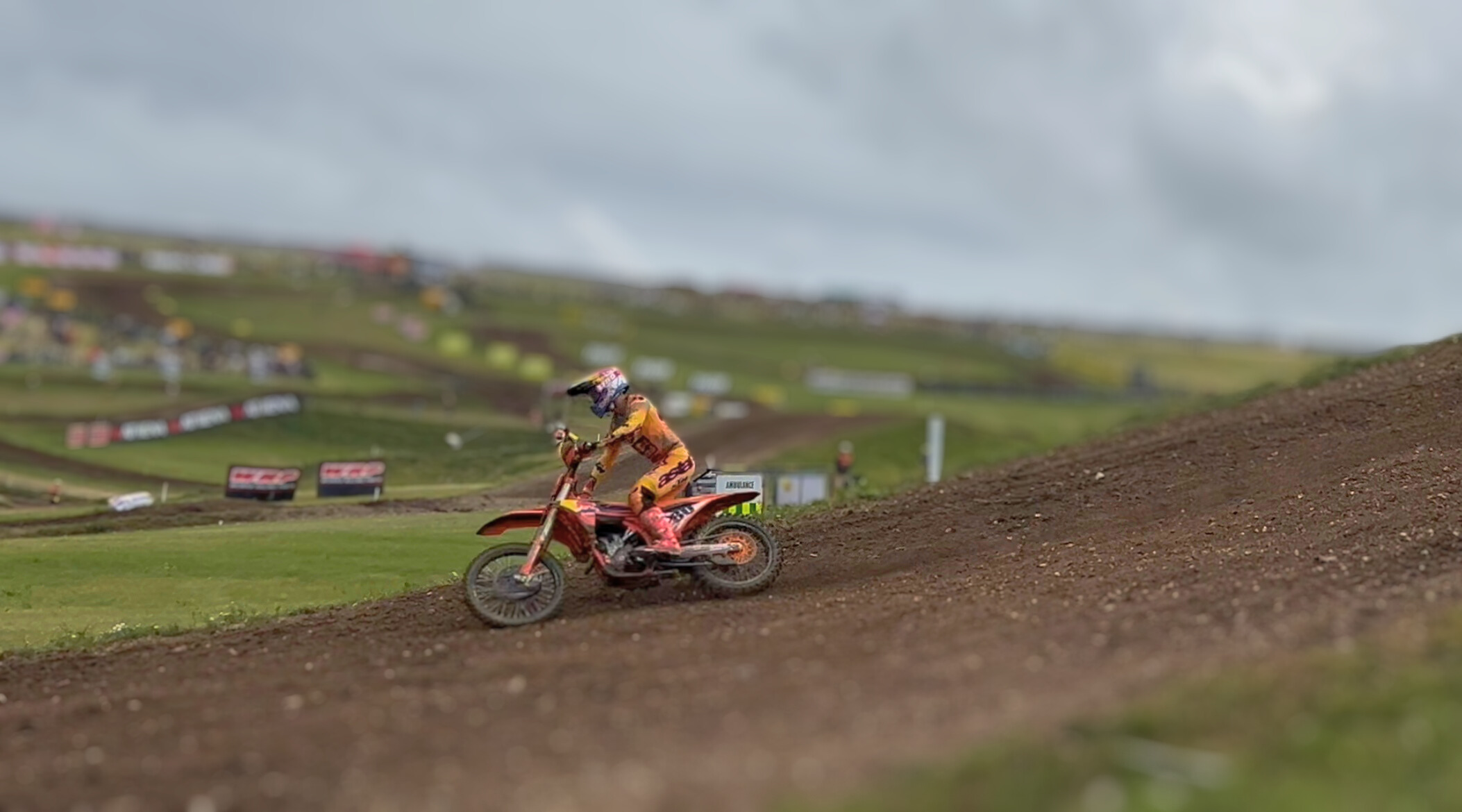
- Adamo in 2025
- Nationality: (Italy) Italian
- Born: August 22, 2003 (age 23) Calatafimi Segesta, Sasi Italy

Motocross career
- Years active: 2019–present
- Teams: •Red Bull KTM Factory Racing Team (2022-Present)
- Championships: •2017 EMX 150cc; •2023 MX2
- Wins: •MX2: 6
- GP debut: 2019 GP of Indonesia, MX2
- First GP win: 2023 GP of Trentino, MX2

Andrea Adamo (born August 22, 2003) is an Italian professional motocross racer who has competed in the Motocross World Championship since 2019. He is the 2023 MX2 Motocross World Champion.

== Motocross career ==
=== 2023 ===
Adamo began the 2023 MX2 championship by placing second at the opening round. His first Grand Prix victory would arise at round 4 in Trentino, Italy. Adamo clinched the 2023 MX2 World Championship at round eighteen in Maggiora, Italy.

=== 2024 ===
2024 saw Adamo fail in defending his MX2 Championship, he struggled with bike setup all season and only scored a handful of podium finishes. This resulted in a sixth place in the Championship.

=== 2025 ===
Adamo began the season with strong form, picking up his first GP win of 2025 at the MXGP of Europe. He followed that with additional overall wins at Trentino and Portugal. Later in the season, he also claimed a win at Germany.

In addition to his GP victories, Adamo had consistent finishes across other rounds. He often placed in the top-five when not winning, contributing solid points toward his championship tally. He also won a dramatic MX2 qualifying race mid-season in Arnhem, defeating rivals including Sacha Coenen and Liam Everts.

Adamo's campaign was not without difficulty: in some GPs he encountered tough competition or finishes outside the podium, especially in rounds dominated by rival Kay de Wolf or Simon Längenfelder.

Adamo finished the season in third place in the MX2 standings with 845 points. He trailed champion Simon Längenfelder and runner-up Kay de Wolf in the final classification. His result marked an improvement over previous seasons and confirmed his status as one of the leading figures in MX2.

== MXGP Results ==
Year	Rnd 1	Rnd 2	Rnd 3	Rnd 4	Rnd 5	Rnd 6	Rnd 7	Rnd 8	Rnd 9	Rnd 10	Rnd 11	Rnd 12	Rnd 13	Rnd 14	Rnd 15	Rnd 16	Rnd 17	Rnd 18	Rnd 19	Rnd 20	Average Finish	Podium Percent	Place
2023 MX2	2	6	2	1	4	3	2	4	2	4	2	5	7	1	3	5	6	3	3	-	3.42	58%	1st
2024 MX2	5	3	12	7	5	2	3	4	9	4	2	4	32	OUT	2	3	11	7	5	2	6.42	37%	6th
2025 MX2	10	5	1	3	1	4	1	2	2	1	10	8	2	2	4	3	2	9	2	11	4.15	60%	3rd
2026 MXGP	8 ARG (Argentina)	5 AND (Andalusia)	19 SUI (Switzerland)	11 SAR (Sardinia)	11 TRE	6 FRA (France)	2 GER (Germany)	6 LAT (Latvia)	4 ITA (Italy)	7 POR (Portugal)	8 RSA (South Africa)	5 GBR (United Kingdom)	6 CZE (Czech Republic)	5 FLA (Flanders)	7 SWE (Sweden)	6 NED (Netherlands)	6 TUR (Turkey)	7 CHN (China)	4 AUS (Australia)	-	7.00	5%	5th
