= Simon Längenfelder =

German motorcycle racer

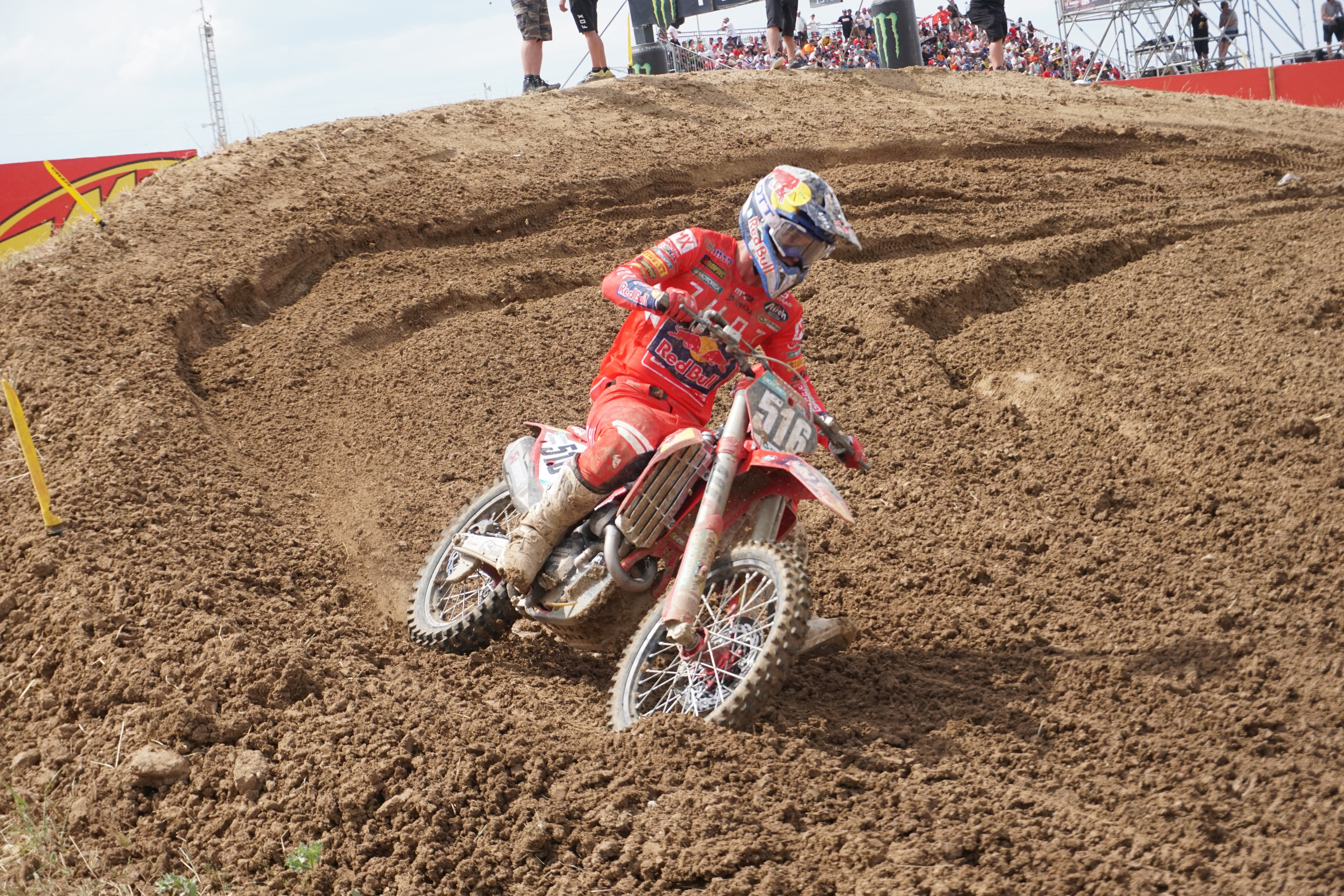
- Längenfelder in 2022
- Nationality: (Germany) German
- Born: March 27, 2004 (age 22) Hof, Germany

Motocross career
- Years active: 2020–present
- Teams: •Red Bull GasGas Factory Racing Team (2022-2024); •Red Bull KTM Factory Racing Team (2024-Present)
- Championships: •2025 MX2
- Wins: •MX2: 12
- GP debut: 2020 GP of Great Britain, MX2
- First GP win: 2022 GP of Great Britain, MX2

Simon Längenfelder (born March 27, 2004) is a German professional Motocross racer who has competed in the Motocross World Championships since 2020. He is the 2025 MX2 World Champion.

== Career ==
2023

Längenfelder had an impressive 2023 MX2 World Championship season, finishing third overall despite missing three rounds due to an arm injury sustained in May. He secured two Grand Prix victories in Spain and Sweden, achieved nine podium finishes, and won eight individual motos. Notably, he clinched five pole positions and led the FOX Holeshot standings with 11 holeshots, earning a €5,000 bonus. At the season finale in Matterley Basin, Längenfelder won the qualifying race and the first moto, finishing second overall for the day. His consistent performance throughout the season, even after returning from injury, underscored his resilience and competitiveness in the MX2 class.

2024

Längenfelder had a strong and consistent 2024 MX2 World Championship season, riding for the Red Bull GASGAS Factory Racing Team. He opened the year with a moto win in Argentina and remained a regular podium contender, earning top-three finishes in Spain, Germany, Turkey, and Indonesia. Despite tough competition from Kay de Wolf and Lucas Coenen, Längenfelder maintained third place in the championship standings for much of the season. He also delivered a solid performance at the Motocross of Nations, helping Team Germany with a third-place finish in one of the MX2 races.

== MXGP Results ==
Year	Rnd 1	Rnd 2	Rnd 3	Rnd 4	Rnd 5	Rnd 6	Rnd 7	Rnd 8	Rnd 9	Rnd 10	Rnd 11	Rnd 12	Rnd 13	Rnd 14	Rnd 15	Rnd 16	Rnd 17	Rnd 18	Rnd 19	Rnd 20	Average Finish	Podium Percent	Place
2022 MX2	1	4	9	11	10	6	4	6	2	5	5	2	3	4	3	8	6	5	-	-	5.22	28%	3rd
2023 MX2	7	4	6	4	5	1	OUT	OUT	OUT	7	3	2	3	2	1	3	4	2	2	-	3.50	56%	3rd
2024 MX2	2	2	4	3	9	9	4	3	3	5	7	3	2	3	3	9	2	3	3	5	4.20	60%	3rd
2025 MX2	3	4	2	4	4	1	3	6	1	5	2	1	5	1	5	1	6	1	3	2	3.00	60%	1st
2026 MX2	1 ARG (Argentina)	2 AND (Andalusia)	1 SUI (Switzerland)	1 SAR (Sardinia)	6 TRE	5 FRA (France)	5 GER (Germany)	13 LAT (Latvia)	6 ITA (Italy)	5 POR (Portugal)	2 RSA (South Africa)	2 GBR (United Kingdom)	13 CZE (Czech Republic)	3 FLA (Flanders)	6 SWE (Sweden)	6 NED (Netherlands)	2 TUR (Turkey)	4 CHN (China)	OUT AUS (Australia)	-	4.67	44%	5th
