= 2025 European Motocross Championship =

Motocross Competition in 2025

The 2025 European Motocross Championship was the 37th European Motocross Championship season since its revival in 1988. It included 16 events and 6 different classes. It started in Spain on 16 March and concluded in Turkey on 7 September. All rounds acted as support classes at the European rounds of the 2025 MXGP.

== EMX250 ==
A 12-round calendar for the 2025 season was announced on 8 January 2025. A round in Finland was added to the calendar at a later date, bringing the number of rounds up to 13.

EMX250 is for riders competing on 2-stroke and 4-stroke motorcycles between 175cc-250cc. Only riders under the age of 21 are allowed to compete.

=== Calendar ===
Round	Date	Grand Prix	Location	Race 1 Winner	Race 2 Winner	Round Winner	Report
1	15-16 March	Castilla-La Mancha	Cózar	(Latvia) Jānis Reišulis	(France) Adrien Petit	(France) Adrien Petit	
2	22-23 March	Europe	Saint-Jean-d'Angély	(Latvia) Jānis Reišulis	(Latvia) Jānis Reišulis	(Latvia) Jānis Reišulis	
3	12-13 April	Trentino	Pietramurata	(Spain) Francisco García	(Italy) Simone Mancini	(Spain) Francisco García	
4	19 & 21 April	Switzerland	Frauenfeld	(Sweden) August Frisk	(Sweden) August Frisk	(Sweden) August Frisk	
5	3-4 May	Portugal	Águeda	(Latvia) Jānis Reišulis	(Latvia) Jānis Reišulis	(Latvia) Jānis Reišulis	
6	10-11 May	Spain	Lugo	(Latvia) Jānis Reišulis	(Latvia) Jānis Reišulis	(Latvia) Jānis Reišulis	
7	24-25 May	France	Ernée	(Hungary) Noel Zanócz	(Netherlands) Ivano van Erp	(Hungary) Noel Zanócz	
8	7-8 June	Latvia	Ķegums	(Latvia) Jānis Reišulis	(Latvia) Jānis Reišulis	(Latvia) Jānis Reišulis	
9	21-22 June	United Kingdom	Matterley Basin	(Spain) Francisco García	(Spain) Francisco García	(Spain) Francisco García	
10	12-13 July	Finland	Iitti - Kymi Ring	(Spain) Francisco García	(Hungary) Noel Zanócz	(Hungary) Noel Zanócz	
11	16-17 August	Sweden	Uddevalla	(Spain) Francisco García	(Hungary) Noel Zanócz	(Hungary) Noel Zanócz	
12	23-24 August	Netherlands	Arnhem	(Spain) Francisco García	(Latvia) Jānis Reišulis	(Latvia) Jānis Reišulis	
13	6-7 September	Turkey	Afyonkarahisar	(Spain) Francisco García	(Spain) Francisco García	(Spain) Francisco García	

=== Entry list ===
Team	Constructor	No	Rider	Rounds
Wozniak MX Racing Team	Yamaha	2	(Denmark) Nicolai Skovbjerg	1–12
Wozniak MX Racing Team	Yamaha	15	(Denmark) Frederik Rahn Stampe	11
Team VENUM BUD Racing Kawasaki	Kawasaki	3	(Australia) Jake Cannon	All
Team VENUM BUD Racing Kawasaki	Kawasaki	29	(Spain) Francisco García	All
	Husqvarna	4	(United Kingdom) Sonny Rooney	9, 12
Ghidinelli Racing	KTM	5	(Italy) Brando Rispoli	1–7, 11–12
Ghidinelli Racing	KTM	717	(France) Alexis Fueri	1–7
F4E Gas Gas Racing Team	Gas Gas	6	(Spain) Elias Escandell	10–13
Suttel Group	Honda	8	(France) Jean-Lino Broussolle	7
Team Castellari	Gas Gas	11	(Italy) Giacomo Bosi	4
AIT Racing Team	Fantic	12	(Norway) Håkon Østerhagen	1–5, 7–11
AIT Racing Team	Fantic	80	(Bulgaria) Vencislav Toshev	11–12
AIT Racing Team	Fantic	407	(United Kingdom) Jake Davies	1–7, 9
MX-Handel Husqvarna Racing	Husqvarna	14	(Estonia) Sebastian Leok	1–8
Team VHR Racing	Yamaha	17	(France) Tom Brunet	1–7, 9–12
737 Performance KTM / D’stock 41	KTM	18	(France) Nicolas Duhamel	7
WZ Racing KTM	KTM	19	(Latvia) Martins Platkēvičs	8
WZ Racing KTM	KTM	262	(Australia) Ryan Alexanderson	5–8
Triumph AQVA Racing	Triumph	20	(Estonia) Romeo Pikand	8
SixtySeven Racing Team	Husqvarna	24	(Netherlands) Jaymian Ramakers	12
SixtySeven Racing Team	KTM	919	(Austria) Maximilian Ernecker	1–10
	Gas Gas	26	(Turkey) Ahmed Geren	13
KTM Sarholz Racing Team	Husqvarna	31	(Germany) Linus Jung	3
KTM Sarholz Racing Team	KTM	770	(Germany) Leon Rudolph	2–3
Gold Racing Team	KTM	32	(Portugal) Martim Espinho	1, 5
	Gas Gas	35	(Turkey) Aras Yıldırım	13
Cat Moto Bauerschmidt Husqvarna	Husqvarna	36	(Switzerland) Nico Greutmann	All
Cat Moto Bauerschmidt Husqvarna	Husqvarna	304	(Australia) Liam Owens	All
Cat Moto Bauerschmidt Husqvarna	Husqvarna	515	(Denmark) Mads Fredsøe	1–3, 7–13
Team MC Konsult	Triumph	40	(Sweden) Nike Korsbeck	11–12
Beta Racing Suomi	Beta	42	(Finland) Sampo Rainio	3, 8, 10–11
Sturm STC Racing Team	Gas Gas	43	(Latvia) Roberts Lūsis	3, 8, 12
Rodeo Racing Team / Kosak Racing Team	Gas Gas	61	(Latvia) Markuss Kokins	8, 10
KTM Kosak Team	KTM	70	(Germany) Valentin Kees	1–12
KTM Kosak Team	KTM	75	(Netherlands) Bradley Mesters	1–10, 12
Lexa MX Racing Team	Honda	71	(United Kingdom) Harvey Cashmore	1–2, 9
Bike It Kawasaki	Kawasaki	79	(United Kingdom) Bobby Bruce	1–7, 9
KMP Honda Racing Team by DVAG	Honda	82	(Spain) Manuel López	3, 5
KMP Honda Racing Team by DVAG	Honda	701	(Lithuania) Marius Adomaitis	7–8, 10–12
Triumph Bilbao - Mutecsa	Triumph	86	(Spain) Daniel Castañondo	1–2, 5–6
Laurense Motors	Kawasaki	88	(Netherlands) Eric van Helvoirt	12
Team Keljon Konehuolto	KTM	90	(Finland) Onni Jaakonsaari	8, 10
Team Keljon Konehuolto	KTM	595	(Finland) Eliel Lehtinen	3–4, 8, 10–11
Fantic Factory Racing EMX250	Fantic	97	(Italy) Simone Mancini	1–11
Fantic Factory Racing EMX250	Fantic	518	(Belgium) Douwe Van Mechgelen	11–12
Martin Racing Technology	Honda	99	(Italy) Alessandro Gaspari	3
Hot Motorbike KTM	KTM	100	(Belgium) Harry Seel	2–7, 9, 11–12
KTM Nantes	KTM	101	(France) Liam Bruneau	2
Mehka KTM/110 Racing/Skawen	KTM	110	(Estonia) Richard Paat	3, 8, 10–11
Team Norway Utvikling	Honda	111	(Norway) Theo Hansen	1–2, 11
Team Norway Utvikling	Husqvarna	175	(Norway) Theodor Imenes	1–4, 11
Team Norway Utvikling	KTM	225	(Norway) Marius Nordbø	2, 11
Mequitec Gas Gas Racing Team	Gas Gas	112	(Spain) Gilen Albisua	1, 5–6
Mequitec Gas Gas Racing Team	Gas Gas	777	(Mexico) Sebastián González	6
Gebben Racing	Yamaha	115	(Netherlands) Svenn Borger	12
Team Bloms MX Racing	Husqvarna	117	(Sweden) Otto Gustavsson	10
	KTM	118	(Sweden) Jakob Zetterholm	11
CMC Racing Team	KTM	122	(Spain) Valentino Vázquez	1, 5–6
MX Team GH125	KTM	125	(France) Guillaume Haudebault	7
Poppin Candy	KTM	131	(United Kingdom) Will Haddock	9
Motoland KTM Seclin	KTM	133	(France) Tom Caneele	7, 9, 12
Best Matic Team	Kawasaki	140	(Italy) Tommaso Lodi	3, 5–7, 9, 11–13
Forsell Motor Racing Team	Husqvarna	143	(Sweden) Sebastian Johansson	8
Triumph Racing Portugal	Triumph	147	(Portugal) Tomás Santos	5
Enduro Istanbul Racing Team	Husqvarna	151	(Turkey) Mehmet Yiğit Kara	13
ASA United Gas Gas	Gas Gas	163	(United Kingdom) Ben Mustoe	9
MaxBart Motorsport	Husqvarna	171	(Italy) Morgan Bennati	6
MaxBart Motorsport	Husqvarna	336	(Italy) Lorenzo Aglietti	3–6
Phoenix Tools Fantic Racing Team	Fantic	179	(United Kingdom) Josh Vail	9
ICM Motorsport	KTM	191	(Italy) Davide Della Valle	2–3, 7
RGS MX Team	Husqvarna	217	(Belgium) Junior Bal	12
Motos VR Yamaha	Yamaha	219	(Portugal) Martim Palma	5
AG MX Racing	Honda	226	(Switzerland) Arthur Steffen	4
Peak Spirit Racing	Triumph	250	(Switzerland) Kjetil Oswald	4
YRC Racing Team	Yamaha	259	(Norway) Martin Bredesen	11
MotoXGeneration	Husqvarna	270	(Israel) Ofir Casey Tzemach	3–8, 10
AMX Racing	KTM	275	(Germany) Eric Rakow	3, 12
JK Racing Yamaha	Yamaha	284	(Italy) Giorgio Orlando	1–2
JK Racing Yamaha	Yamaha	724	(Latvia) Jēkabs Kubuliņš	12
Gas Gas Tandberg MC	Gas Gas	285	(Norway) Patrick Valbjørn	11
MS Motorcycles	Husqvarna	290	(Germany) Joshua Völker	2–4
RFME MX Junior Team	Gas Gas	300	(Spain) Salvador Pérez	1–9, 11, 13
RFME MX Junior Team	Gas Gas	365	(Spain) Adrià Monné	1–9, 11–13
	KTM	301	(Turkey) Mert Akkafa	13
EastMX	Gas Gas	309	(Finland) Santeri Oinonen	10
Vogelsang Powersports	Yamaha	312	(Switzerland) Noe Zumstein	4
Ljunggrens Motor	KTM	320	(Sweden) Sebastian Sundman	1–4, 10–12
	KTM	321	(Italy) Alessandro Traversini	4
SC Sporthomes Husqvarna	Husqvarna	322	(United Kingdom) Charlie Heyman	9
Diana MX Team	Husqvarna	329	(Italy) Maurizio Scollo	1–9
Diana MX Team	Husqvarna	669	(Italy) Luca Ruffini	1–12
Superior Moto	Gas Gas	331	(Switzerland) Noryn Polsini	4
MotocrossCenter/GM TGN SL	Husqvarna	337	(Spain) Bruno Miró	1–4
Jezyk Racing Team	Triumph	351	(Spain) Carlos Prat	1–3, 5–7, 9, 11–12
	KTM	357	(Norway) Odin Ramseng Haseth	11
Silve Racing	KTM	358	(Finland) Nico Stenberg	8, 10–11
Silve Racing	KTM	418	(Finland) Saku Mansikkamäki	10–11
Bauerschmidt Motorsport	Husqvarna	363	(Liechtenstein) Lyonel Reichl	1–8, 11–13
A.B. Racing Team	Gas Gas	364	(Italy) Mattia Nardo	3, 12
A.B. Racing Team	Gas Gas	928	(Italy) Vincenzo Bove	3
Honda Moto France/Chave Motos	Honda	371	(France) Paolo Maschio	1–7, 9
MC Sport Racing Team	Gas Gas	380	(Sweden) Alfred Franzén	1
Team TMX Competition	Yamaha	389	(France) Jules Pietre	7
RT400/Pol Motors	Gas Gas	400	(Netherlands) Roan Tolsma	2
Power by JJ racing team	KTM	402	(Denmark) Casey Karstrøm	12
Power by JJ racing team	KTM	992	(Sweden) Sandro Sols	10–11
	KTM	404	(United Kingdom) Domonic Newbury	9
AVT Campers KTM	KTM	410	(United Kingdom) James Barker	1–4, 6–8
CEC Racing	Husqvarna	412	(Sweden) Filip Bank	1–2, 10
CEC Racing	Husqvarna	884	(Sweden) Casper Lindmark	11
Finch Factory Racing	Triumph	419	(United Kingdom) Joe Brookes	11–12
JWR Honda Racing	Honda	422	(Sweden) Hugo Forsgren	3, 8, 10–12
GripMesser Racing Team	Gas Gas	427	(Netherlands) Mick Kennedy	2, 4, 12
GripMesser Racing Team	Gas Gas	612	(Estonia) Joosep Pärn	8, 10–11
	KTM	431	(Norway) Markus Sommerstad	8, 10–12
VHR VRT Yamaha Official EMX250 Team	Yamaha	432	(Netherlands) Ivano van Erp	1–3, 7–11
VHR VRT Yamaha Official EMX250 Team	Yamaha	772	(Latvia) Jānis Reišulis	All
RGS Racing	KTM	440	(Sweden) Linus Persson	10–11
Dirt Store Triumph Racing	Triumph	441	(United Kingdom) Billy Askew	1–9, 11–12
Yamaha Motor France/Monster Army/Drag'on Tek	Yamaha	446	(France) Adrien Petit	1–3, 5–6, 12
KRT Kawasaki	Kawasaki	450	(Finland) Simo Koskinen	8, 10
	KTM	454	(Finland) Jan Jasper Koiv	10
	KTM	455	(Belgium) Lucas Wautier	2–4
Chambers KTM Racing	KTM	456	(United Kingdom) Ollie Colmer	All
Osička MX Team	KTM	466	(Czech Republic) Václav Janout	8, 11–12
Husqvarna Scandinavia/Cross Centeret Snellingen	Husqvarna	471	(Norway) Pelle Gundersen	1–2, 4–6, 8, 10
DirtHut	KTM	472	(United Kingdom) Max Harris	9
Cermen KTM Racing Team	KTM	479	(Czech Republic) Vítězslav Marek	1–2
Motopalvelu	KTM	480	(Finland) Kasimir Hindersson	8, 11
Brouwer Motors	KTM	485	(Netherlands) Senna van Voorst	12
Gabriel SS24 KTM Factory Juniors	KTM	494	(Germany) Maximilian Werner	1–2, 11–13
Gabriel SS24 KTM Factory Juniors	KTM	574	(Netherlands) Gyan Doensen	1–11
Husqvarna Scandinavia	Husqvarna	496	(Sweden) Alve Callemo	11
MRA Racing Team	Gas Gas	499	(Slovakia) Jaroslav Katriňák	3
	Yamaha	500	(Turkey) Ali Akkafa	13
	Yamaha	501	(Netherlands) Mirco ten Kate	12
Grizzly Racing Service	KTM	505	(Israel) Ben Almagor	3, 9
	Husqvarna	524	(Belgium) Emile De Baere	2
Becker Racing	KTM	529	(Belgium) Maxime Lucas	12
	Gas Gas	567	(Italy) Brando Polato	13
KL Racing Team	KTM	586	(Denmark) Lucas Søndergaard	3–4, 11
	Husqvarna	634	(Belgium) Maeron Peeters	12
SE-Team	Fantic	707	(Finland) Iiro Tofferi	10
JM Honda Racing	Honda	716	(Hungary) Noel Zanócz	All
Team Cap Endurance	Gas Gas	712	(France) Pierrick Castan	2
Stub Racing/Kaduuz MX Store	Husqvarna	725	(Denmark) Jonas Stub Buch	11
Marin & Fritid Racing Team	Husqvarna	743	(Sweden) Filip Hagdahl	3–4, 11–12
Dirtbike MX Racing Team	KTM	753	(Italy) Patrick Busatto	4
Afil Services	KTM	828	(Belgium) Tom Dukerts	2–3, 7, 12
Bartolini Racing Team	Honda	920	(Italy) Luca Moro	3
Kullen 1502 KTM	KTM	961	(Sweden) August Frisk	1–7
MB Motocross Team	KTM	979	(Norway) Edvard Hestvik	11

=== Riders Championship ===
Pos	Rider	Bike	CAS		EUR (Europe)		TRE		SUI (Switzerland)		POR (Portugal)		ESP (Spain)		FRA (France)		LAT (Latvia)		GBR (United Kingdom)		FIN (Finland)		SWE (Sweden)		NED (Netherlands)		TUR (Turkey)		Points
1	(Latvia) Jānis Reišulis	Yamaha	1	12	1	1	2	Ret	Ret	3	1	1	1	1	2	3	1	1	2	9	8	2	2	2	2	1	2	2	522
2	(Hungary) Noel Zanócz	Honda	4	3	5	3	7	19	5	4	4	2	5	3	1	4	5	2	10	2	3	1	3	1	3	5	10	9	463
3	(Spain) Francisco García	Kawasaki	Ret	2	18	4	1	7	3	2	3	4	Ret	5	4	Ret	2	7	1	1	1	9	1	3	1	4	1	1	457
4	(Switzerland) Nico Greutmann	Husqvarna	Ret	Ret	8	19	9	11	2	6	5	3	6	2	16	18	9	11	12	8	7	4	20	13	5	6	9	8	296
5	(Australia) Liam Owens	Husqvarna	Ret	24	31	14	15	15	Ret	7	6	20	4	DSQ	6	7	6	5	7	7	12	5	8	7	4	2	4	3	286
6	(Netherlands) Gyan Doensen	KTM	11	9	Ret	6	17	3	11	9	7	17	7	4	3	2	3	3	6	13	Ret	8	6	Ret					266
7	(Denmark) Nicolai Skovbjerg	Yamaha	10	4	11	10	4	12	18	10	14	22	12	6	Ret	DNS	8	6	15	18	2	3	10	8	9	7			251
8	(Australia) Jake Cannon	Kawasaki	2	21	Ret	9	25	33	7	19	Ret	Ret	13	14	9	9	Ret	14	3	4	4	20	9	5	6	23	7	4	229
9	(Denmark) Mads Fredsøe	Husqvarna	3	6	25	5	Ret	DNS							20	6	7	13	13	27	16	7	5	4	12	3	8	7	206
10	(Liechtenstein) Lyonel Reichl	Husqvarna	12	8	7	7	11	5	16	20	11	7	8	9	Ret	5	15	Ret					15	17	17	18	6	5	201
11	(Netherlands) Bradley Mesters	KTM	7	11	20	12	10	9	8	15	8	6	10	23	19	11	Ret	10	17	15	6	12			7	8			200
12	(Spain) Adrià Monné	Gas Gas	29	22	10	25	6	6	6	8	9	12	11	10	23	13	16	18	Ret	12			14	11	11	33	5	6	194
13	(Italy) Simone Mancini	Fantic	Ret	17	4	37	Ret	1	4	11	2	8	2	16	5	Ret	10	Ret	5	14	Ret	Ret	Ret	DNS					182
14	(Netherlands) Ivano van Erp	Yamaha	9	10	6	27	Ret	DNS							7	1	25	8	4	3	5	6	4	Ret					178
15	(Germany) Valentin Kees	KTM	15	25	14	15	14	17	14	27	18	24	19	15	8	12	12	16	11	6	11	11	13	6	15	21			159
16	(Sweden) August Frisk	KTM	8	7	Ret	13	13	10	1	1	26	9	3	DSQ	Ret	DNS													136
17	(United Kingdom) Billy Askew	Triumph	13	Ret	9	26	3	16	9	5	10	Ret	17	Ret	10	Ret	Ret	Ret	Ret	10			11	9	Ret	29			133
18	(France) Adrien Petit	Yamaha	5	1	2	2	DNS	DNS			13	5	21	DNS											Ret	12			118
19	(France) Alexis Fueri	KTM	23	23	21	22	5	2	10	13	16	Ret	9	13	11	17													96
20	(Austria) Maximilian Ernecker	KTM	16	Ret	13	39	12	22	17	12	12	16	15	7	Ret	15	23	Ret	Ret	11	Ret	Ret							85
21	(United Kingdom) Ollie Colmer	KTM	26	13	17	18	26	14	15	25	20	15	18	24	28	21	31	12	16	19	15	Ret	30	25	34	16	12	12	83
22	(Norway) Håkon Østerhagen	Fantic	22	18	23	20	20	13	12	24	Ret	Ret			31	14	4	22	8	17	18	10	DNS	DNS					78
23	(Spain) Salvador Pérez	Gas Gas	19	20	3	23	16	4	Ret	23	22	Ret	14	25	27	25	17	21	Ret	21			26	Ret			13	10	76
24	(France) Tom Brunet	Yamaha	32	Ret	33	16	Ret	28	32	17	27	21	29	Ret	12	10			21	25	Ret	16	27	10	13	9			65
25	(France) Paolo Maschio	Honda	14	19	DNQ	DNQ	18	Ret	Ret	18	15	10	20	8	14	16			18	Ret									61
26	(Estonia) Sebastian Leok	Husqvarna	20	Ret	16	24	8	25	20	16	24	14	28	18	13	8	Ret	DNS											56
27	(Italy) Brando Rispoli	KTM	6	15	Ret	8	Ret	20	13	Ret	25	13	22	21	19	DNS							Ret	Ret	19	24			55
28	(Italy) Luca Ruffini	Husqvarna	17	16	22	38	Ret	21	19	14	Ret	18	26	12	15	Ret	24	19	20	20	17	15	22	Ret					50
29	(Germany) Maximilian Werner	KTM	21	5	12	21																	29	29	Ret	17	11	11	49
30	(Spain) Elias Escandell	Gas Gas																			26	29	7	12	25	Ret	3	17	47
31	(Latvia) Markuss Kokins	Gas Gas															Ret	4			14	14							32
32	(Finland) Sampo Rainio	Beta					28	Ret									14	17			9	Ret	23	18					26
33	(Latvia) Jēkabs Kubuliņš	Yamaha																							8	10			24
34	(Australia) Ryan Alexanderson	KTM									17	28	16	11	17	20	33	Ret											24
35	(United Kingdom) Charlie Heyman	Husqvarna																	14	5									23
36	(Estonia) Joosep Pärn	Gas Gas															13	9			21	18	32	22					23
37	(Sweden) Linus Persson	KTM																			10	Ret	12	19					22
38	(United Kingdom) Bobby Bruce	Kawasaki	DNQ	DNQ	19	11	21	Ret	Ret	21	Ret	11	DNS	DNS	Ret	DNS			DNS	DNS									22
39	(Belgium) Maxime Lucas	KTM																							10	13			19
40	(Finland) Nico Stenberg	KTM															11	Ret			27	Ret	19	15					18
41	(United Kingdom) Ben Mustoe	Gas Gas																	9	16									17
42	(Italy) Brando Polato	Gas Gas																									14	13	15
43	(Germany) Leon Rudolph	KTM			15	17	19	18																					15
44	(Norway) Pelle Gundersen	Husqvarna	18	28	35	40			21	22	23	19	27	17			20	20			20	19							14
45	(Spain) Manuel López	Honda					22	8			31	Ret																	13
46	(Sweden) Sandro Sols	KTM																			Ret	13	35	16					13
47	(Finland) Kasimir Hindersson	KTM															22	15					Ret	14					13
48	(Turkey) Yiğit Kara	Husqvarna																									14	13	12
49	(Netherlands) Mirco ten Kate	Yamaha																							21	11			10
50	(United Kingdom) Joe Brookes	Triumph																					18	Ret	14	26			10
51	(Turkey) Ahmed Geren	Gas Gas																									17	15	10
52	(Latvia) Roberts Lūsis	Gas Gas					DNQ	DNQ									19	Ret							Ret	14			9
53	(Finland) Saku Mansikkamäki	KTM																			13	28	31	Ret					8
54	(Italy) Tommaso Lodi	Kawasaki					DNQ	DNQ			DNQ	DNQ	36	28	DNQ	DNQ			28	32			DNQ	DNQ	DNQ	DNQ	15	19	8
55	(Spain) Carlos Prat	Triumph	Ret	14	Ret	29	DNQ	DNQ			Ret	Ret	31	DSQ	30	29			26	26			Ret	21	32	Ret			7
56	(Belgium) Douwe Van Mechgelen	Fantic																					Ret	Ret	20	15			7
57	(Turkey) Aras Yıldırım	Gas Gas																									19	16	7
58	(Bulgaria) Vencislav Toshev	Fantic																					DNQ	DNQ	16	20			6
59	(Turkey) Mert Akkafa	KTM																									18	18	6
60	(Israel) Ofir Casey Tzemach	Husqvarna					DNQ	DNQ	24	32	19	Ret	23	20	37	22	18	Ret			Ret	Ret							6
61	(Sweden) Casper Lindmark	Husqvarna																					16	27					5
62	(Sweden) Alve Callemo	Husqvarna																					17	23					4
63	(Finland) Onni Jaakonsaari	KTM															27	Ret			Ret	17							4
64	(Germany) Eric Rakow	KTM					24	24																	18	25			3
65	(Sweden) Hugo Forsgren	Honda					33	23									30	23			19	22	21	24	22	28			2
66	(Lithuania) Marius Adomaitis	Honda													22	28	26	Ret			28	Ret	25	Ret	29	19			2
67	(Italy) Maurizio Scollo	Husqvarna	27	29	30	28	Ret	30	Ret	26	Ret	23	Ret	DSQ	24	24	Ret	DNS	19	23									2
68	(Spain) Gilen Albisua	Gas Gas	28	27							30	26	30	19															2
69	(France) Nicolas Duhamel	KTM													29	19													2
70	(Czech Republic) Václav Janout	KTM															DNS	DNS					Ret	20	26	Ret			1
	(Estonia) Richard Paat	KTM					DNQ	DNQ									21	28			24	21	24	Ret					0
	(Portugal) Martim Espinho	KTM	DNQ	DNQ							21	25																	0
	(France) Jules Pietre	Yamaha													21	DNS													0
	(Belgium) Harry Seel	KTM			DNQ	DNQ	32	35	30	29	33	30	32	27	26	23			30	22			DNQ	DNQ	30	27			0
	(Netherlands) Eric van Helvoirt	Kawasaki																							23	22			0
	(United Kingdom) James Barker	KTM	Ret	Ret	24	35	DNQ	32	Ret	34			24	22	25	Ret	DNQ	DNQ											0
	(United Kingdom) Josh Vail	Fantic																	22	24									0
	(Sweden) Otto Gustavsson	Husqvarna																			22	24							0
	(Italy) Patrick Busatto	KTM							22	Ret																			0
	(Spain) Bruno Miró	Husqvarna	24	Ret	26	36	23	29	DNQ	DNQ																			0
	(Finland) Simo Koskinen	Kawasaki															28	24			29	23							0
	(Finland) Eliel Lehtinen	KTM					DNQ	DNQ	28	DNS							29	27			23	25	Ret	28					0
	(France) Tom Caneele	KTM													32	26			23	28					DNQ	DNQ			0
	(Switzerland) Arthur Steffen	Honda							23	28																			0
	(Israel) Ben Almagor	KTM					DNQ	DNQ											24	30									0
	(Belgium) Junior Bal	Husqvarna																							24	Ret			0
	(Italy) Morgan Bennati	Husqvarna											25	26															0
	(Italy) Lorenzo Aglietti	Husqvarna					27	27	25	38	Ret	Ret	34	29															0
	(Italy) Giorgio Orlando	Yamaha	25	Ret	28	32																							0
	(Estonia) Romeo Pikand	Triumph															Ret	25											0
	(United Kingdom) Domonic Newbury	KTM																	25	Ret									0
	(Finland) Santeri Oinonen	Gas Gas																			25	Ret							0
	(Spain) Daniel Castañondo	Triumph	31	26	DNQ	DNQ					28	27	Ret	Ret															0
	(Netherlands) Mick Kennedy	Gas Gas			34	34			26	30															27	31			0
	(Italy) Alessandro Gaspari	Honda					30	26																					0
	(Sweden) Nike Korsbeck	Triumph																					33	26	31	32			0
	(Latvia) Martins Platkēvičs	KTM															32	26											0
	(Finland) Jan Jasper Koiv	KTM																			Ret	26							0
	(Sweden) Sebastian Sundman	KTM	Ret	30	DNQ	DNQ	DNQ	DNQ	27	35											Ret	27	DNQ	DNQ	DNQ	30			0
	(United Kingdom) Max Harris	KTM																	27	29									0
	(Czech Republic) Vítězslav Marek	KTM	Ret	DNS	27	31																							0
	(Belgium) Tom Dukerts	KTM			DNQ	DNQ	DNQ	DNQ							33	27									DNQ	DNQ			0
	(Netherlands) Senna van Voorst	KTM																							28	35			0
	(Spain) Valentino Vázquez	KTM	30	Ret							29	Ret	33	Ret															0
	(Italy) Vincenzo Bove	Gas Gas					29	31																					0
	(France) Pierrick Castan	Gas Gas			29	33																							0
	(Switzerland) Noe Zumstein	Yamaha							29	33																			0
	(United Kingdom) Sonny Rooney	Husqvarna																	29	33					DNQ	DNQ			0
	(Sweden) Sebastian Johansson	Husqvarna															DNQ	29											0
	(France) Liam Bruneau	KTM			32	30																							0
	(Italy) Davide Della Valle	KTM			DNQ	DNQ	DNQ	DNQ							35	30													0
	(Finland) Iiro Tofferi	Fantic																			30	Ret							0
	(Switzerland) Noryn Polsini	Gas Gas							31	31																			0
	(United Kingdom) Will Haddock	KTM																	31	31									0
	(Italy) Mattia Nardo	Gas Gas					31	34																	DNQ	DNQ			0
	(France) Guillaume Haudebault	KTM													DNQ	31													0
	(Norway) Theo Hansen	Honda	DNQ	31	DNQ	DNQ																	DNQ	DNQ					0
	(Sweden) Filip Hagdahl	Husqvarna					DNQ	DNQ	33	36													DNQ	DNQ	33	Ret			0
	(Netherlands) Jaymian Ramakers	Husqvarna																							35	34			0
	(United Kingdom) Harvey Cashmore	Honda	DNQ	DNQ	DNQ	DNQ													Ret	34									0
	(Portugal) Tomás Santos	Triumph									34	Ret																	0
	(United Kingdom) Jake Davies	Fantic	DNQ	DNQ	DNQ	DNQ	DNQ	DNQ	DNQ	DNQ	DNQ	DNQ	35	Ret	DNQ	DNQ			Ret	Ret									0
	(Denmark) Lucas Søndergaard	KTM					DNQ	DNQ	DNQ	37													DNQ	DNQ					0
	(Norway) Markus Sommerstad	KTM															DNQ	DNQ			Ret	Ret	DNQ	DNQ	DNQ	DNQ			0
	(Mexico) Sebastián González	Gas Gas											DNS	DNS															0
	(Norway) Marius Nordbø	KTM			DNQ	DNQ																	DNS	DNS	DNQ	DNQ			0
	(Belgium) Maeron Peeters	Husqvarna																							DNS	DNS			0
	(Turkey) Ali Akkafa	Yamaha																									DNS	DNS	0
	(France) Jean-Lino Broussolle	Honda													DNQ	DNS													0
	(Norway) Theodor Imenes	Husqvarna	DNQ	DNQ	DNQ	DNQ	DNQ	DNQ	DNQ	DNQ													DNQ	DNQ					0
	(Germany) Joshua Völker	Husqvarna			DNQ	DNQ	DNQ	DNQ	DNQ	DNQ																			0
	(Belgium) Lucas Wautier	KTM			DNQ	DNQ	DNQ	DNQ	DNQ	DNQ																			0
	(Sweden) Filip Bank	Husqvarna	DNQ	DNQ	DNQ	DNQ															DNQ	DNQ							0
	(Sweden) Alfred Franzén	Gas Gas	DNQ	DNQ																									0
	(Belgium) Emile De Baere	Husqvarna			DNQ	DNQ																							0
	(Netherlands) Roan Tolsma	Gas Gas			DNQ	DNQ																							0
	(Slovakia) Jaroslav Katriňák	Gas Gas					DNQ	DNQ																					0
	(Germany) Linus Jung	Husqvarna					DNQ	DNQ																					0
	(Italy) Luca Moro	Honda					DNQ	DNQ																					0
	(Italy) Giacomo Bosi	Gas Gas							DNQ	DNQ																			0
	(Italy) Alessandro Traversini	KTM							DNQ	DNQ																			0
	(Switzerland) Kjetil Oswald	Triumph							DNQ	DNQ																			0
	(Portugal) Martim Palma	Yamaha									DNQ	DNQ																	0
	(Norway) Odin Ramseng Haseth	KTM																					DNQ	DNQ					0
	(Sweden) Jakob Zetterholm	KTM																					DNQ	DNQ					0
	(Norway) Patrick Valbjørn	Gas Gas																					DNQ	DNQ					0
	(Norway) Edvard Hestvik	KTM																					DNQ	DNQ					0
	(Denmark) Jonas Stub Buch	Husqvarna																					DNQ	DNQ					0
	(Norway) Martin Bredesen	Yamaha																					DNQ	DNQ					0
	(Denmark) Frederik Rahn Stampe	Yamaha																					DNQ	DNQ					0
	(Netherlands) Svenn Borger	Yamaha																							DNQ	DNQ			0
	(Denmark) Casey Karstrøm	KTM																							DNQ	DNQ			0
Pos	Rider	Bike	CAS		EUR (Europe)		TRE		SUI (Switzerland)		POR (Portugal)		ESP (Spain)		FRA (France)		LAT (Latvia)		GBR (United Kingdom)		FIN (Finland)		SWE (Sweden)		NED (Netherlands)		TUR (Turkey)		Points

=== Manufacturers Championship ===
Pos	Bike	CAS		EUR (Europe)		TRE		SUI (Switzerland)		POR (Portugal)		ESP (Spain)		FRA (France)		LAT (Latvia)		GBR (United Kingdom)		FIN (Finland)		SWE (Sweden)		NED (Netherlands)		TUR (Turkey)		Points
1	Yamaha	1	1	1	1	2	12	18	3	1	1	1	1	2	1	1	1	2	3	2	2	2	2	2	1	2	2	572
2	Kawasaki	2	2	18	4	1	7	3	2	3	4	13	5	4	9	2	7	1	1	1	9	1	3	1	4	1	1	499
3	Honda	4	3	5	3	7	8	5	4	4	2	5	3	1	4	5	2	10	2	3	1	3	1	3	5	10	9	474
4	Husqvarna	3	6	7	5	8	5	2	6	5	3	4	2	6	5	6	5	7	5	7	4	5	4	4	2	4	3	444
5	KTM	6	5	12	6	5	2	1	1	7	6	3	4	3	2	3	3	6	6	6	8	6	6	7	8	11	11	427
6	Gas Gas	19	20	3	23	6	4	6	8	9	12	11	10	23	13	13	4	9	12	14	14	7	11	11	14	3	6	271
7	Fantic	22	17	4	20	20	1	4	11	2	8	2	16	5	14	4	22	5	14	18	10	Ret	Ret	16	15			223
8	Triumph	13	14	9	26	3	16	9	5	10	27	17	Ret	10	29	Ret	25	26	10			11	9	14	26			147
9	Beta					28	Ret									14	17			9	Ret	23	18					26
Pos	Bike	CAS		EUR (Europe)		TRE		SUI (Switzerland)		POR (Portugal)		ESP (Spain)		FRA (France)		LAT (Latvia)		GBR (United Kingdom)		FIN (Finland)		SWE (Sweden)		NED (Netherlands)		TUR (Turkey)		Points

== EMX125 ==
A 11-round calendar for the 2025 season was announced on 8 January 2025. A round in Finland was included at a later date, bringing to number up to 12.

EMX125 is for riders competing on 2-stroke motorcycles of 125cc.

=== Calendar ===
Round	Date	Grand Prix	Location	Race 1 Winner	Race 2 Winner	Round Winner	Report
1	15-16 March	Castilla-La Mancha	Cózar	(Italy) Filippo Mantovani	(Latvia) Jēkabs Kubuliņš	(Belgium) Jarne Bervoets	
2	22-23 March	Europe	Saint-Jean-d'Angély	(France) Mano Fauré	(Hungary) Áron Katona	(France) Mano Fauré	
3	5-6 April	Sardinia	Riola Sardo	(Hungary) Áron Katona	(Hungary) Áron Katona	(Hungary) Áron Katona	
4	12-13 April	Trentino	Pietramurata	(Republic of Ireland) Cole McCullough	(Italy) Niccolò Mannini	(France) Mano Fauré	
5	19 & 21 April	Switzerland	Frauenfeld	(Italy) Nicolò Alvisi	(Hungary) Áron Katona	(Hungary) Áron Katona	
6	3-4 May	Portugal	Águeda	(Italy) Nicolò Alvisi	(France) Mano Fauré	(France) Mano Fauré	
7	24-25 May	France	Ernée	(Italy) Nicolò Alvisi	(Italy) Nicolò Alvisi	(Italy) Nicolò Alvisi	
8	31 May & 1 June	Germany	Teutschenthal	(Italy) Nicolò Alvisi	(France) Mano Fauré	(France) Mano Fauré	
9	7-8 June	Latvia	Ķegums	(Italy) Nicolò Alvisi	(France) Mano Fauré	(France) Mano Fauré	
10	21-22 June	United Kingdom	Matterley Basin	(France) Mano Fauré	(France) Mano Fauré	(France) Mano Fauré	
11	12-13 July	Finland	Iitti - Kymi Ring	(Italy) Nicolò Alvisi	(Italy) Nicolò Alvisi	(Italy) Nicolò Alvisi	
12	2-3 August	Flanders	Lommel	(Belgium) Jarne Bervoets	(Austria) Ricardo Bauer	(Belgium) Jarne Bervoets	

=== Entry list ===
Team	Constructor	No	Rider	Rounds
TM Moto CRD Motosport	TM	7	(Italy) Niccolò Mannini	All
AIT Racing Team	Fantic	8	(Bulgaria) Vencislav Toshev	All
AIT Racing Team	Fantic	417	(Netherlands) Jayson van Drunen	12
Sturm STC Racing	Gas Gas	9	(Latvia) Raivo Laicāns	1–4, 8–11
Kenneth Gundersen MX Team	KTM	10	(Norway) Erling Engeland	8, 12
Kenneth Gundersen MX Team	KTM	79	(Norway) Albert Listøen-Owsinski	12
Kenneth Gundersen MX Team	KTM	961	(Norway) Jacob Rønning	1–2
Gas Gas TRT Motorcycle	Gas Gas	13	(Venezuela) César Aponte	6
Matt Gardiner MX KTM Race Team	Gas Gas	14	(United Kingdom) Freddie Gardiner	2
Team Ambiance Moto	Beta	18	(France) Emerick Vergote	1
Ausió Yamaha Racing Team	Yamaha	19	(Spain) Jordi Soler	1
Ausió Yamaha Racing Team	Yamaha	374	(Spain) Oleguer Riba	1–2, 6, 12
Racestore KTM Factory Rookies	KTM	20	(Italy) Nicolò Alvisi	All
Racestore KTM Factory Rookies	KTM	817	(Hungary) Áron Katona	1–8
Spratt Racing	KTM	21	(United Kingdom) Lewis Spratt	10
	Gas Gas	23	(Belgium) Seppe Giuliani	4
MBP MX Team	Gas Gas	24	(Lithuania) Rojus Zaborskis	9
MBP MX Team	Gas Gas	623	(Lithuania) Eimantas Čepulis	9
Testa Racing Team	Husqvarna	25	(Czech Republic) David Kadleček	1–2, 4
Team Yamaha Europe MJC	Yamaha	26	(New Zealand) Levi Townley	1–4
Team Yamaha Europe MJC	Yamaha	295	(France) Mano Fauré	All
Team Yamaha Europe MJC	Yamaha	499	(Netherlands) Dani Heitink	All
Team Yamaha Europe MJC	Yamaha	503	(Belgium) Jarne Bervoets	1–7, 9–12
Motovation Motosport KTM	KTM	28	(Netherlands) Dean Gregoire	All
	KTM	29	(Italy) Samuele Piredda	3
	KTM	80	(Italy) Mattia Piredda	3
S Briggs Commercial	Yamaha	30	(United Kingdom) Charlie Richmond	2, 7–8, 10, 12
S Briggs Commercial	Yamaha	180	(United Kingdom) Zane Stephens	10
Team Wenger Bike	Gas Gas	31	(Switzerland) Marc Liechti	5
F4E Gas Gas Racing Team	Gas Gas	32	(Belgium) Seth Priem	1–6, 10, 12
F4E Gas Gas Racing Team	Gas Gas	474	(Belgium) Ian Ampoorter	1–10, 12
F4E Gas Gas Racing Team	Gas Gas	536	(Belgium) Arthur Decouter	1–5, 7–8, 10, 12
JG Moto Action MotoProX Team	KTM	36	(Czech Republic) Stanislav Pojar	4
Red Bull KTM South Africa	KTM	37	(South Africa) Trey Cox	4–5
Meyer Yamaha Racing	Yamaha	39	(Germany) Oskar Romberg	5, 8, 10, 12
Meyer Yamaha Racing	Yamaha	153	(Germany) Max Meyer	4–5, 8, 10, 12
PowerbyJJ Racing Team	KTM	43	(Sweden) Dante Lantz	1–2, 7–9, 11
PowerbyJJ Racing Team	KTM	801	(Sweden) Jack Ljungnér	9
CTM Motorhomes	Yamaha	46	(Belgium) Thybe Ceulemans	2, 4–5, 7, 12
	KTM	48	(Italy) Lorenzo Bonino	4–5
Team Moto-Seinäjoki	KTM	50	(Finland) Sulo Hautala	11
Jezyk Racing Team	KTM	51	(Spain) Iván Martínez	6–7, 12
Jezyk Racing Team	KTM	110	(Spain) Joel Mataró	6–8, 10
	Fantic	53	(Sweden) Hugo Bergqvist	11–12
DreamTeam	Fantic	58	(Italy) Andrea Roberti	1–6, 12
DreamTeam	Fantic	555	(Republic of Ireland) Cole McCullough	1–8
Team Ride Innovation Development	Husqvarna	66	(France) Yannis Lopez	1–3
	Yamaha	69	(France) Célestin Renaud	7
De Baets Yamaha MX Team	Yamaha	71	(Denmark) Bertram Thorius	All
De Baets Yamaha MX Team	Yamaha	589	(Belgium) Tyla Van de Poel	1–2
Boutaca Racing Team	Husqvarna	78	(Portugal) Gonçalo Cardoso	1, 3–4, 6, 12
MotoFM Saúde	KTM	82	(Portugal) Filipe Saúde	6
RFME Spain National Team	Gas Gas	83	(Spain) Enzo Badenas	6–10
RFME Spain National Team	Gas Gas	268	(Spain) Samuel Tapia	1–10
RFME Spain National Team	Gas Gas	494	(Spain) Pablo Lara	1–6
KTM Eesti	KTM	84	(Estonia) Kaspar Uibu	9
	KTM	94	(Spain) Javier Salinas	1
MTA MX Racing	KTM	102	(Italy) Filippo Mantovani	All
BvZ Motorrad	KTM	103	(Andorra) Martin Kettlitz	2–4, 6, 10, 12
	Yamaha	108	(Netherlands) Tim Appelo	12
Team Rasmira Race Shop Team Fantic	Fantic	111	(Finland) Sasu Koivunen	11
	Yamaha	114	(Israel) Tal Ovadia	12
Forsell Motor Racing Team	Husqvarna	122	(Sweden) Liam Sörensson	8–9, 11
Forsell Motor Racing Team	Husqvarna	451	(Sweden) Melker Larsson	9, 11
	Yamaha	132	(United Kingdom) Fabian Junior Morrison	10
Fantic Factory Racing EMX125	Fantic	141	(Italy) Francesco Bellei	All
Fantic Factory Racing EMX125	Fantic	518	(Belgium) Douwe Van Mechgelen	All
Team RX Moto	KTM	145	(Finland) Anton Agge	11
Team RX Moto	KTM	171	(Finland) Arttu Sahlstén	9, 11
KMP Honda Racing Team by DVAG	Gas Gas	146	(Germany) Pasquale di Monaco	4, 8, 12
	Yamaha	159	(France) Mateo Bernard	2
Gas Gas Latvija	Gas Gas	161	(Latvia) Alberts Knapšis	9
TRT Motorcycles	KTM	166	(Spain) Álex Lasheras	6
	KTM	167	(United Kingdom) Jack Evans	10
723 Race Bikes	Fantic	170	(United Kingdom) Harry Lee	10
JK Racing Yamaha	Yamaha	184	(United Kingdom) Jamie Keith	1, 3, 7
Polned KTM	KTM	188	(Netherlands) Rizan Hartman	3, 5
Mapimoto Racing Team	Gas Gas	195	(Italy) Mattia Giuliani	4
	Yamaha	198	(France) Kévin Le Galle	2, 7
Oppliger Racing	KTM	202	(Switzerland) Ryan Oppliger	All
Team Castro MX	KTM	208	(Spain) Izan Querol	6
	Gas Gas	209	(Italy) Diego Spitaleri	4–5, 12
MCV Motorsport ABF Italia	TM	211	(Italy) Riccardo Pini	All
MCV Motorsport ABF Italia	TM	911	(Italy) Gennaro Utech	1–6
Kuttler Moto	KTM	214	(France) Léo Diss-Fenard	1–2, 4–8, 10, 12
Drag'on Tek	Fantic	221	(France) Arno Cazet	7
Dreams Racing	KTM	223	(Switzerland) Emil Ziemer	1–2, 7–10, 12
Dreams Racing	KTM	281	(Italy) David Cracco	1–8, 10, 12
Dreams Racing	KTM	712	(Switzerland) Toni Ziemer	1–2, 8–9
MJC Team	Yamaha	228	(Italy) Michael Conte	1–10, 12
	Yamaha	231	(France) Elvis Gaulon	2
Fueled Designs Yamaha Center Umeå Racing Team	Yamaha	232	(Sweden) Nils Ruth	8–9, 11–12
Team Seven Motorsport	Husqvarna	240	(Chile) César Paine Díaz	3–12
Team Seven Motorsport	Husqvarna	353	(Italy) Andrea Uccellini	1–6, 8–12
MCR Racing Team	Husqvarna	246	(Italy) Giorgio Verderosa	4
	Gas Gas	259	(France) Félix Cardineau	1–2
Motos Arribas	Husqvarna	270	(Spain) Óscar Quirós	1–7, 12
Manetta Team	Husqvarna	275	(Italy) Edoardo Riganti	4–5
Otto Racing	Yamaha	278	(Italy) Alessandro di Pietro	10
KTM Dimoco	KTM	292	(Austria) Ricardo Bauer	1–3, 5, 7–10, 12
Bohlins i Järbo AB	Husqvarna	298	(Sweden) Sander Sommerlee	9
Subra Motos/CKR Suspension	KTM	299	(France) Dylan Conti	2, 5
	KTM	300	(Finland) Eetu Saarimäki	11
RC Motorsport	Gas Gas	301	(France) Liam Bruneau	7
Kid MX Team	KTM	303	(Spain) Ot Marí	1, 4, 6
Mequitec Gas Gas Racing Team	Gas Gas	306	(Spain) Jordi Alba	1, 6
	KTM	309	(France) Eliot Buysschaert	2, 7
	Husqvarna	311	(Italy) Leonardo Calandra	4–5, 12
Team New Bike Yamaha	Yamaha	326	(France) Kenzo Ferez	2, 4–10, 12
Team Fantic	Fantic	328	(Finland) Roope Vikström	11
Laurense Motors	Gas Gas	333	(Netherlands) Sem van Helvoirt	12
Endurance MX/Gas Gas Racestore	Gas Gas	336	(Italy) Lapo Aglietti	4–5
	Yamaha	350	(France) Sleny Goyer	1–8
KTM Namura Bikes	KTM	385	(Spain) Jorge Salvador	1–2, 4–6, 12
D.V.S Junior Racing	TM	398	(France) Kylian Rocca	1–2, 5
Power by JJ	KTM	402	(Denmark) Casey Karstrøm	12
Team Racingbike	KTM	404	(Finland) Matias Miettinen	8–9, 11
JH-MX Service	KTM	411	(Netherlands) Dex van den Broek	9–11
Lifeline/Madison Powersports	Yamaha	418	(United Kingdom) Drew Stock	1–2, 4–5, 7–8, 10, 12
	Husqvarna	423	(Sweden) Benjamin Mårtensson	12
	Gas Gas	425	(Finland) Eemil Pesonen	11
	Yamaha	426	(Republic of Ireland) Michael McCullagh	10, 12
Orion Racing Team	KTM	428	(Czech Republic) Martin Červenka	4
	Gas Gas	429	(Belgium) Emerick Pansaerts	12
Motorspeed	KTM	431	(Norway) Markus Sommerstad	8
KTM GST Berlin	KTM	436	(Germany) Finn Lange	8, 12
Team Motopalvelu	KTM	456	(Finland) Topias Reinikainen	3–4, 9, 11
JE68 Motorcycles	KTM	464	(Sweden) Jakob Albrekt	10, 12
	KTM	470	(Belgium) Wout van Beysterveldt	12
Cermen KTM Racing Team	KTM	479	(Czech Republic) Vítězslav Marek	3–5
RGS Racing Team	Yamaha	490	(Belgium) Vince van Hoof	12
Husqvarna Motorcycles Scandinavia	Husqvarna	496	(Sweden) Alve Callemo	8–9, 11–12
Gebben Racing	Yamaha	502	(Netherlands) Kay Zijlstra	12
	KTM	504	(Belgium) Sem Baert	12
	Fantic	512	(Belgium) Liam Pölöskei	7, 12
	KTM	515	(Netherlands) Quintin Nijland	12
Jopa MX	Fantic	522	(Netherlands) Timo Heuver	8, 12
Cab Screens Crescent Yamaha	Yamaha	531	(United Kingdom) Lucas Moncrieff	7–8, 10
Manchester MC/Mr Dig	Yamaha	548	(United Kingdom) Hayden Statt	1–2, 4–5, 7–10
Yamaha Scandinavia/Yamaha Store Roskilde	Yamaha	549	(Denmark) Storm Maymann	1–5, 8, 12
	Yamaha	551	(Finland) Rossi Halén	9
CEC Racing	Gas Gas	553	(Sweden) John Karleyel	10–12
CEC Racing	Husqvarna	884	(Sweden) Casper Lindmark	7–12
Yamaha Keskus	Yamaha	602	(Estonia) Aston Allas	9
	KTM	611	(Sweden) Gustav Johnsson	12
	KTM	614	(Sweden) Helmer Nilsson	4
CanaryFactory	Yamaha	646	(Spain) José Hernández	1–10, 12
	Yamaha	702	(Norway) Dennis Stene	12
Kameleon Auta Z USA	KTM	703	(Poland) Jakub Pućkowski	9
JK Racing Yamaha	Yamaha	724	(Latvia) Jēkabs Kubuliņš	All
DMX Celestini Motorsport	Fantic	737	(Italy) Luca Colonnelli	4, 7–9, 12
Johannes-Bikes	Fantic	747	(Italy) Spartaco Pitanti	10
SHR Motorsports	Yamaha	751	(Poland) Dawid Zaremba	4, 8–9
Sturm STC Racing Team	Husqvarna	757	(Latvia) Toms Dankerts	9
Ajo Motorsport	KTM	777	(Finland) Viktor Leppälä	1–2, 7–9, 11
	KTM	784	(Italy) Michael Tocchio	7
	Yamaha	789	(Sweden) Hugo Farjevall	11
Becker Racing	Husqvarna	811	(Germany) Mark Tanneberger	12
	Yamaha	868	(France) Maxence Maupin	2
Yamaha Racing Switzerland	Yamaha	917	(Switzerland) Dany Henzer	5
	Yamaha	921	(Germany) Tim Engelmann	8
KTM Sarholz Racing Team	KTM	929	(Austria) Moritz Ernecker	2, 4–5, 8–12
MB Motocross Team	Gas Gas	979	(Norway) Edvard Hestvik	1–5, 9

=== Riders Championship ===
Pos	Rider	Bike	CAS		EUR (Europe)		SAR		TRE		SUI (Switzerland)		POR (Portugal)		FRA (France)		GER (Germany)		LAT (Latvia)		GBR (United Kingdom)		FIN (Finland)		BEL (Flanders)		Points
1	(Italy) Nicolò Alvisi	KTM	13	Ret	9	2	2	4	6	5	1	6	1	7	1	1	1	4	1	3	17	4	1	1	6	2	439
2	(France) Mano Fauré	Yamaha	21	Ret	1	4	3	6	2	4	5	10	4	1	Ret	3	2	1	2	1	1	1	2	2	2	11	428
3	(Italy) Filippo Mantovani	KTM	1	28	2	11	17	10	13	3	18	7	6	5	2	4	3	3	3	4	3	2	Ret	9	7	10	345
4	(Italy) Niccolò Mannini	TM	2	7	3	3	15	37	7	1	15	5	5	14	14	5	4	9	9	6	4	3	12	10	9	9	328
5	(Netherlands) Dani Heitink	Yamaha	7	5	7	5	4	11	19	8	2	8	13	11	11	10	5	6	4	2	13	6	5	22	3	7	321
6	(Latvia) Jēkabs Kubuliņš	Yamaha	29	1	16	14	8	2	9	10	7	3	10	3	18	6	12	2	12	5	12	13	7	7	4	3	317
7	(Italy) Francesco Bellei	Fantic	5	11	5	7	6	5	5	2	12	2	3	4	16	Ret	11	16	Ret	10	2	5	4	4	19	Ret	301
8	(Belgium) Jarne Bervoets	Yamaha	3	2	14	13	11	7	20	Ret	10	18	8	6	Ret	DNS			5	14	18	7	6	3	1	5	240
9	(Italy) Riccardo Pini	TM	6	3	13	9	7	8	4	7	23	9	12	28	4	2	13	18	10	Ret	6	Ret	13	11	16	18	238
10	(Switzerland) Ryan Oppliger	KTM	10	13	15	6	12	12	8	Ret	6	13	11	26	7	13	17	7	6	11	5	9	9	5	34	14	232
11	(Hungary) Áron Katona	KTM	4	8	12	1	1	1	3	6	3	1	2	21	Ret	25	Ret	DNS									217
12	(Belgium) Douwe Van Mechgelen	Fantic	8	12	17	20	9	15	24	Ret	25	21	9	8	10	16	6	11	7	7	9	11	3	6	35	4	214
13	(Netherlands) Dean Gregoire	KTM	17	21	8	18	Ret	18	Ret	16	8	12	7	12	5	12	Ret	12	8	Ret	7	10	8	Ret	5	6	189
14	(Republic of Ireland) Cole McCullough	Fantic	15	6	Ret	12	5	3	1	Ret	9	4	20	2	3	Ret	Ret	DNS									164
15	(Bulgaria) Vencislav Toshev	Fantic	9	16	26	22	18	14	23	Ret	14	16	21	9	9	7	19	26	15	30	16	15	14	17	12	8	129
16	(Chile) César Paine Díaz	Husqvarna					27	21	21	12	11	26	17	24	8	18	7	5	29	Ret	10	17	10	13	11	16	118
17	(Austria) Ricardo Bauer	KTM	Ret	22	10	19	33	DNS			20	17			13	14	15	15	16	9	11	16			8	1	115
18	(France) Sleny Goyer	Yamaha	14	17	6	15	14	9	12	14	16	14	15	27	12	26	DNQ	DNQ									94
19	(Italy) Gennaro Utech	TM	Ret	4	4	8	13	Ret	10	Ret	4	Ret	18	Ret													89
20	(Belgium) Ian Ampoorter	Gas Gas	18	10	23	29	16	13	15	Ret	30	19	37	18	31	17	14	32	13	15	20	18			10	12	87
21	(Sweden) Alve Callemo	Husqvarna															10	8	19	12			11	8	20	15	65
22	(Austria) Moritz Ernecker	KTM			DNQ	DNQ			16	Ret	26	20					8	27	11	27	8	19	18	12	15	Ret	62
23	(Denmark) Bertram Thorius	Yamaha	22	23	28	16	19	22	14	11	35	31	19	15	36	9	25	17	Ret	20	Ret	DNS	16	15	27	19	62
24	(Spain) Pablo Lara	Gas Gas	12	19	11	23	21	17	34	19	21	11	14	17													48
25	(Latvia) Raivo Laicāns	Gas Gas	19	31	29	17	10	20	DNQ	DNQ							35	29	22	8	24	23	24	16			36
26	(United Kingdom) Charlie Richmond	Yamaha			25	Ret									22	21	24	13			14	8			13	21	36
27	(Czech Republic) Vítězslav Marek	KTM					22	16	11	9	22	15															33
28	(Italy) Andrea Uccellini	Husqvarna	Ret	Ret	Ret	24	29	36	Ret	23	24	23	33	10			DSQ	10	20	Ret	15	Ret	Ret	Ret	DNS	Ret	29
29	(France) Liam Bruneau	Gas Gas													6	8											28
30	(United Kingdom) Drew Stock	Yamaha	16	20	DNQ	DNQ			31	18	17	30			19	20	22	24			29	20			14	17	28
31	(Sweden) Casper Lindmark	Husqvarna													28	22	9	14	17	18	38	32	Ret	Ret	36	33	26
32	(Italy) Andrea Roberti	Fantic	25	14	21	21	Ret	24	18	15	13	22	26	22											32	25	24
33	(Switzerland) Emil Ziemer	KTM	27	Ret	30	10									27	27	21	Ret	31	Ret	25	12			28	Ret	20
34	(Finland) Matias Miettinen	KTM															20	23	14	17			15	19			20
35	(New Zealand) Levi Townley	Yamaha	11	18	18	Ret	Ret	19	DNS	DNS																	18
36	(United Kingdom) Jamie Keith	Yamaha	DNQ	DNQ			Ret	DNS							15	11											16
37	(Sweden) John Karleyel	Gas Gas																			DNQ	27	20	18	17	13	16
38	(Italy) Michael Conte	Yamaha	28	Ret	DNQ	DNQ	28	34	DNQ	DNQ	29	25	28	13	24	15	DNQ	38	DNQ	DNQ	33	22	DNQ	DNQ	DNQ	DNQ	14
39	(Sweden) Dante Lantz	KTM	DNQ	DNQ	32	28									21	36	Ret	30	Ret	13			17	20			13
40	(Belgium) Tyla Van de Poel	Yamaha	23	9	DNQ	DNQ																					12
41	(Germany) Oskar Romberg	Yamaha									DNQ	DNQ					16	22			21	14			30	31	12
42	(United Kingdom) Hayden Statt	Yamaha	20	Ret	31	Ret			17	22	39	38			17	29	34	25	35	29	19	31					11
43	(Poland) Dawid Zaremba	Yamaha							26	13							28	34	21	Ret							8
44	(Finland) Viktor Leppälä	KTM	DNQ	DNQ	DNQ	DNQ									38	37	DNQ	DNQ	18	16			25	Ret			8
45	(Finland) Arttu Sahlstén	KTM																	25	Ret			Ret	14			7
46	(France) Félix Cardineau	Gas Gas	Ret	15	DNQ	DNQ																					6
47	(Belgium) Seth Priem	Gas Gas	Ret	27	DNQ	DNQ	23	Ret	DNQ	DNQ	37	29	23	16							31	DNS			33	DNS	5
48	(Spain) Ot Marí	KTM	Ret	29					DNQ	29			16	Ret													5
49	(Germany) Max Meyer	Yamaha							37	DNS	34	24					18	19			22	21			24	Ret	5
50	(Italy) Edoardo Riganti	Husqvarna							29	17	31	32															4
51	(Netherlands) Sem van Helvoirt	Gas Gas																							18	22	3
52	(France) Léo Diss-Fenard	KTM	DNQ	DNQ	19	Ret			33	Ret	33	33	27	33	20	23	24	35			26	25			DNQ	DNQ	3
53	(Sweden) Hugo Bergqvist	Fantic																					19	21	DNQ	DNQ	2
54	(Portugal) Gonçalo Cardoso	Husqvarna	Ret	Ret			Ret	28	30	28			22	19											DNQ	DNQ	2
55	(Spain) Samuel Tapia	Gas Gas	Ret	26	24	Ret	25	23			19	28	30	23	29	32	30	28	DNQ	DNQ	28	24					2
56	(Latvia) Alberts Knapšis	Gas Gas																	23	19							2
57	(France) Arno Cazet	Fantic													23	19											2
58	(Italy) David Cracco	KTM	DNQ	32	20	Ret	32	29	22	21	38	34	31	29	DNQ	DNQ	DNQ	DNQ			27	26			Ret	20	2
59	(Denmark) Storm Maymann	Yamaha	26	33	DNQ	DNQ	20	26	25	26	27	37					33	20							DNQ	DNQ	2
60	(Italy) Leonardo Calandra	Husqvarna							32	20	36	27													DNQ	DNQ	1
61	(Spain) José Hernández	Yamaha	DNQ	DNQ	DNQ	DNQ	DNQ	33	DNQ	DNQ	DNQ	DNQ	32	20	DNQ	28	DNQ	37	DNQ	DNQ	36	Ret			DNQ	DNQ	1
	(Finland) Eetu Saarimäki	KTM																					21	23			0
	(France) Kenzo Ferez	Yamaha			35	30			36	30	32	36	36	32	26	24	26	21	DNQ	DNQ	34	28			DNQ	DNQ	0
	(Latvia) Toms Dankerts	Husqvarna																	27	21							0
	(Netherlands) Timo Heuver	Fantic															DNQ	DNQ							21	28	0
	(France) Eliot Buysschaert	KTM			22	31									25	35											0
	(Finland) Topias Reinikainen	KTM					26	Ret	DNQ	DNQ									DNQ	DNQ			22	28			0
	(Netherlands) Dex van den Broek	KTM																	26	22	37	Ret	32	DNS			0
	(Germany) Pasquale di Monaco	Gas Gas							DNQ	DNQ							DNQ	DNQ							22	35	0
	(Germany) Finn Lange	KTM															23	33							23	32	0
	(Spain) Enzo Badenas	Gas Gas											24	Ret	30	30	29	Ret	DNQ	DNQ	23	30					0
	(Finland) Sulo Hautala	KTM																					23	24			0
	(Denmark) Casey Karstrøm	KTM																							26	23	0
	(Estonia) Kaspar Uibu	KTM																	28	23							0
	(France) Yannis Lopez	Husqvarna	24	25	27	Ret	24	27																			0
	(Spain) Jorge Salvador	KTM	DNQ	DNQ	Ret	32			35	Ret	DNQ	DNQ	25	Ret											38	24	0
	(Czech Republic) David Kadleček	Husqvarna	31	24	DNQ	DNQ			38	27																	0
	(Czech Republic) Martin Červenka	KTM							27	24																	0
	(Poland) Jakub Pućkowski	KTM																	30	24							0
	(Sweden) Sander Sommerlee	Husqvarna																	24	Ret							0
	(Sweden) Melker Larsson	Husqvarna																	Ret	25			26	27			0
	(Venezuela) César Aponte	Gas Gas											29	25													0
	(Germany) Mark Tanneberger	Husqvarna																							25	29	0
	(Sweden) Liam Sörensson	Husqvarna															31	31	Ret	Ret			Ret	25			0
	(Norway) Edvard Hestvik	Gas Gas	DNQ	DNQ	DNQ	DNQ	31	25	DNQ	DNQ	DNQ	DNQ							DNQ	DNQ							0
	(United Kingdom) Freddie Gardiner	Gas Gas			34	25																					0
	(Finland) Sasu Koivunen	KTM																					29	26			0
	(Andorra) Martin Kettlitz	KTM			33	26	Ret	30	DNQ	DNQ			DNQ	DNQ							DNQ	DNQ			DNQ	DNQ	0
	(Sweden) Jack Ljungnér	KTM																	32	26							0
	(Sweden) Benjamin Mårtensson	Husqvarna																							37	26	0
	(Sweden) Hugo Farjevall	Yamaha																					27	30			0
	(France) Mateo Bernard	Yamaha			Ret	27																					0
	(Netherlands) Jayson van Drunen	Fantic																							Ret	27	0
	(Sweden) Nils Ruth	Yamaha															DNQ	DNQ	DNQ	DNQ			28	31	DNQ	DNQ	0
	(Lithuania) Eimantas Čepulis	Gas Gas																	33	28							0
	(South Africa) Trey Cox	KTM							DNQ	DNQ	28	35															0
	(Belgium) Vince van Hoof	Yamaha																							29	30	0
	(United Kingdom) Lucas Moncrieff	Yamaha													33	31	DNQ	DNQ			32	29					0
	(Finland) Anton Agge	KTM																					31	29			0
	(Netherlands) Rizan Hartman	KTM					30	31			DNQ	DNQ															0
	(Spain) Iván Martínez	KTM											Ret	30	32	34									DNQ	DNQ	0
	(Spain) Oleguer Riba	Yamaha	32	30	DNQ	DNQ							DNQ	DNQ											DNQ	DNQ	0
	(Finland) Roope Vikström	KTM																					30	32			0
	(United Kingdom) Harry Lee	Fantic																			30	34					0
	(France) Emerick Vergote	Beta	30	DNS																							0
	(Belgium) Wout van Beysterveldt	KTM																							31	34	0
	(Spain) Joel Mataró	KTM											35	31	DNQ	DNQ	DNQ	DNQ			DNQ	DNQ					0
	(Italy) Luca Colonnelli	Fantic							DNQ	DNQ					DNQ	DNQ	32	36	34	Ret					DNQ	DNQ	0
	(Belgium) Arthur Decouter	Gas Gas	DNQ	DNQ	DNQ	DNQ	DNQ	32	DNQ	DNQ	DNQ	DNQ			DNQ	DNQ	DNQ	DNQ			DNQ	DNQ			DNQ	DNQ	0
	(France) Célestin Renaud	Yamaha													34	33											0
	(Sweden) Jakob Albrekt	KTM																			35	33			DNQ	DNQ	0
	(Spain) Jordi Alba	Gas Gas	DNQ	DNQ									34	34													0
	(Italy) Mattia Piredda	KTM					34	35																			0
	(Spain) Óscar Quirós	Husqvarna	DNQ	DNQ	DNQ	DNQ	DNQ	DNQ	DNQ	DNQ	DNQ	DNQ	38	35	DNQ	DNQ									DNQ	DNQ	0
	(Italy) Michael Tocchio	KTM													35	Ret											0
	(Italy) Lorenzo Bonino	KTM							DNQ	DNQ	40	39															0
	(Spain) Izan Querol	KTM											39	Ret													0
	(Italy) Alessandro di Pietro	Yamaha																			39	Ret					0
	(France) Kylian Rocca	TM	DNQ	DNQ	Ret	Ret					DNQ	DNQ															0
	(Finland) Eemil Pesonen	Gas Gas																					Ret	Ret			0
	(United Kingdom) Zane Stephens	Yamaha																			DNQ	Ret					0
	(Sweden) Gustav Johnsson	KTM																							DNS	DNS	0
	(Spain) Álex Lasheras	KTM											DNS	DNS													0
	(France) Elvis Gaulon	Yamaha			DNS	DNS																					0
	(Belgium) Thybe Ceulemans	Yamaha			DNQ	DNQ			DNQ	DNQ	DNQ	DNQ			DNQ	DNQ									DNQ	DNQ	0
	(Switzerland) Toni Ziemer	KTM	DNQ	DNQ	DNQ	DNQ											DNQ	DNQ	DNQ	DNQ							0
	(Italy) Diego Spitaleri	Gas Gas							DNQ	DNQ	DNQ	DNQ													DNQ	DNQ	0
	(Norway) Jacob Rønning	KTM	DNQ	DNQ	DNQ	DNQ																					0
	(France) Dylan Conti	KTM			DNQ	DNQ					DNQ	DNQ															0
	(Italy) Lapo Aglietti	Gas Gas							DNQ	DNQ	DNQ	DNQ															0
	(France) Kévin Le Galle	Yamaha			DNQ	DNQ									DNQ	DNQ											0
	(Belgium) Liam Pölöskei	Fantic													DNQ	DNQ									DNQ	DNQ	0
	(Norway) Erling Engeland	KTM															DNQ	DNQ							DNQ	DNQ	0
	(Republic of Ireland) Michael McCullagh	Yamaha																			DNQ	DNQ			DNQ	DNQ	0
	(Spain) Jordi Soler	Yamaha	DNQ	DNQ																							0
	(Spain) Javier Salinas	KTM	DNQ	DNQ																							0
	(France) Maxence Maupin	Yamaha			DNQ	DNQ																					0
	(Italy) Samuele Piredda	KTM					DNQ	DNQ																			0
	(Czech Republic) Stanislav Pojar	KTM							DNQ	DNQ																	0
	(Sweden) Helmer Nilsson	KTM							DNQ	DNQ																	0
	(Italy) Giorgio Verderosa	Husqvarna							DNQ	DNQ																	0
	(Belgium) Seppe Giuliani	Gas Gas							DNQ	DNQ																	0
	(Italy) Mattia Giuliani	Gas Gas							DNQ	DNQ																	0
	(Switzerland) Marc Liechti	Gas Gas									DNQ	DNQ															0
	(Switzerland) Dany Henzer	Yamaha									DNQ	DNQ															0
	(Portugal) Filipe Saúde	KTM											DNQ	DNQ													0
	(Norway) Markus Sommerstad	KTM															DNQ	DNQ									0
	(Germany) Tim Engelmann	Yamaha															DNQ	DNQ									0
	(Estonia) Aston Allas	Yamaha																	DNQ	DNQ							0
	(Lithuania) Rojus Zaborskis	Gas Gas																	DNQ	DNQ							0
	(Finland) Rossi Halén	Yamaha																	DNQ	DNQ							0
	(United Kingdom) Jack Evans	KTM																			DNQ	DNQ					0
	(United Kingdom) Lewis Spratt	KTM																			DNQ	DNQ					0
	(Italy) Spartaco Pitanti	Fantic																			DNQ	DNQ					0
	(United Kingdom) Fabian Junior Morrison	Yamaha																			DNQ	DNQ					0
	(Netherlands) Kay Zijlstra	Yamaha																							DNQ	DNQ	0
	(Israel) Tal Ovadia	Yamaha																							DNQ	DNQ	0
	(Norway) Albert Listøen-Owsinski	KTM																							DNQ	DNQ	0
	(Belgium) Emerick Pansaerts	Gas Gas																							DNQ	DNQ	0
	(Norway) Dennis Stene	Yamaha																							DNQ	DNQ	0
	(Netherlands) Quintin Nijland	Yamaha																							DNQ	DNQ	0
	(Netherlands) Tim Appelo	Yamaha																							DNQ	DNQ	0
	(Belgium) Sem Baert	KTM																							DNQ	DNQ	0
Pos	Rider	Bike	CAS		EUR (Europe)		SAR		TRE		SUI (Switzerland)		POR (Portugal)		FRA (France)		GER (Germany)		LAT (Latvia)		GBR (United Kingdom)		FIN (Finland)		BEL (Flanders)		Points

=== Manufacturers Championship ===
Pos	Bike	CAS		EUR (Europe)		SAR		TRE		SUI (Switzerland)		POR (Portugal)		FRA (France)		GER (Germany)		LAT (Latvia)		GBR (United Kingdom)		FIN (Finland)		BEL (Flanders)		Points
1	KTM	1	8	2	1	1	1	3	3	1	1	1	5	1	1	1	3	1	3	3	2	1	1	5	1	539
2	Yamaha	3	1	1	4	3	2	2	4	2	3	4	1	11	3	2	1	2	1	1	1	2	2	1	3	518
3	Fantic	5	6	5	7	5	3	1	2	9	2	3	2	3	7	6	11	7	7	2	5	3	4	12	4	410
4	TM	2	3	3	3	7	8	4	1	4	5	5	14	4	2	4	9	9	6	4	3	12	10	9	9	388
5	Husqvarna	24	24	27	24	24	21	21	12	11	23	17	10	8	18	7	5	17	12	10	17	10	8	11	15	148
6	Gas Gas	12	10	11	17	10	13	15	19	19	11	14	16	6	8	14	28	13	8	20	18	20	16	10	12	147
	Beta	30	DNS																							0
Pos	Bike	CAS		EUR (Europe)		SAR		TRE		SUI (Switzerland)		POR (Portugal)		FRA (France)		GER (Germany)		LAT (Latvia)		GBR (United Kingdom)		FIN (Finland)		BEL (Flanders)		Points

== EMXOpen ==
A 1-round calendar for the 2025 season was announced on 8 January 2025. EMXOpen is for riders competing on 2-stroke and 4-stroke motorcycles up to 450cc.

=== Calendar ===
Round	Date	Grand Prix	Location	Race 1 Winner	Race 2 Winner	Round Winner	Report
1	3 August	Flanders	Lommel	(Belgium) Cedric Grobben	(Latvia) Mairis Pumpurs	(Belgium) Cedric Grobben	

=== Entry list ===
Team	Constructor	No	Rider
F4E Gas Gas Racing Team	Gas Gas	3	(Belgium) Joshua Feytons
F4E Gas Gas Racing Team	Gas Gas	6	(Spain) Elias Escandell
F4E Gas Gas Racing Team	Gas Gas	34	(Belgium) Giles Goethals
	Honda	4	(Belgium) Thallon Caspermans
Joramo OffRoad Shop	Husqvarna	9	(Belgium) Yoran Moens
Laurense Motors/WLM Design	KTM	15	(Netherlands) Erik de Bruyn
Apico Factory Racing Honda	Honda	16	(United Kingdom) Tom Grimshaw
Frisk Suspension By Toftén	Yamaha	22	(Sweden) Adam Einarsson
	Husqvarna	27	(Netherlands) Freek Slapak
Racing Center Antwerpen	KTM	35	(Belgium) Brent Aerden
RVH Racing	Gas Gas	38	(Belgium) Ryan Van Hove
Silve Racing	KTM	43	(Finland) Matias Vesterinen
Silve Racing	KTM	142	(Finland) Jere Haavisto
Tech 32 Racing MX	Triumph	49	(France) Tom Guyon
DAM Racing	Gas Gas	50	(Belgium) Cedric Grobben
Husqvarna Motorcycles Scandinavia	Husqvarna	52	(Sweden) Albin Gerhardsson
	Gas Gas	59	(Belgium) Joe Vandereydt
Lexa MX Racing Team	Honda	70	(United Kingdom) Harvey Cashmore
GI Cross Racing Team	Husqvarna	86	(Italy) Matteo del Coco
Camping Cupido	Yamaha	88	(Netherlands) Marcel Conijn
Laurense Motors Kawasaki Racing Team	Kawasaki	94	(Netherlands) Sven van der Mierden
Chambers KTM Racing	KTM	95	(United Kingdom) Dan Thornhill
	Yamaha	97	(Croatia) Matija Kelava
Team 101%	Yamaha	101	(Estonia) Erki Kahro
JH Real Estate	KTM	118	(Netherlands) Joël van Mechelen
	Husqvarna	121	(Netherlands) Mitchell van den Essenburg
FM CAMI Racing Team	Honda	123	(Italy) Federico Tuani
JH MX Service	Gas Gas	134	(Netherlands) Micha-Boy de Waal
	KTM	136	(Netherlands) Loeka Thonies
	KTM	138	(Denmark) William Voxen Kleemann
Honda Dream Racing Bells	Honda	163	(Japan) Yuki Okura
Tim Dobberkau Motorsport	Husqvarna	171	(Germany) Fynn-Niklas Tornau
	KTM	173	(Denmark) Jakob Kjær
Buitenhuis Racing	Yamaha	177	(Netherlands) Kevin Buitenhuis
	Honda	194	(Belgium) Arne Tielens
	Husqvarna	198	(Sweden) Jesper Hansson
Amsil Racing FZ Motorsport KTM	KTM	200	(Italy) Filippo Zonta
	Triumph	208	(Germany) Dave Abbing
	Honda	211	(Belgium) Arno Van Mieghem
	Yamaha	217	(Netherlands) Teun Cooymans
Honda Center Eesti	Honda	221	(Estonia) Priit Rätsep
Honda Center Eesti	Honda	377	(Estonia) Gert Krestinov
KMP Honda Racing Team by DVAG	Honda	224	(Czech Republic) Jakub Terešák
	Honda	228	(France) Alexandre Viltard
	Honda	237	(Sweden) Linus Grelsson
Team RX Moto	KTM	248	(Finland) Miro Varjonen
SAS TPC KTM	KTM	249	(France) Mathéo Miot
MS Motorcycles	Husqvarna	290	(Germany) Joshua Völker
	KTM	303	(Netherlands) Krijn van Vroenhoven
Yamaha Motor France/Monster Army/Drag'on Tek	Yamaha	446	(France) Adrien Petit
KTM Sarholz Racing Team	KTM	470	(Germany) Peter König
WPM Motors	KTM	484	(Netherlands) Dave Kooiker
Grizzly Racing Service	KTM	505	(Israel) Ben Almagor
	KTM	537	(Netherlands) Damian Wedage
De Baets Yamaha MX Team	Yamaha	589	(Belgium) Tyla Van de Poel
Motosports Racing Team	Husqvarna	601	(Latvia) Mairis Pumpurs
GripMesser Racing Team	Gas Gas	612	(Estonia) Joosep Pärn
	Husqvarna	634	(Belgium) Maeron Peeters
Van der Wardt Bouw	TM	715	(Netherlands) Jaap Janssen
	KTM	716	(Germany) Leon Rehberg
	Gas Gas	811	(Netherlands) Lex Mastenbroek
	KTM	811	(Netherlands) Ryan Witlox
Afil Services	KTM	828	(Belgium) Tom Dukerts
	Kawasaki	841	(Netherlands) Robert Fobbe
	Yamaha	867	(Belgium) Dimitri Van de Sanden
	Gas Gas	911	(Netherlands) Henk Pater
	KTM	992	(Germany) Marvin Pfeffer

=== Riders Championship ===
Pos	Rider	Bike	BEL (Flanders)		Points
1	(Belgium) Cedric Grobben	Gas Gas	1	3	45
2	(Latvia) Mairis Pumpurs	Husqvarna	10	1	36
3	(France) Adrien Petit	Yamaha	3	8	33
4	(Sweden) Albin Gerhardsson	Husqvarna	7	5	30
5	(Germany) Peter König	KTM	2	13	30
6	(Belgium) Brent Aerden	KTM	4	12	27
7	(France) Mathéo Miot	Yamaha	13	4	26
8	(Netherlands) Dave Kooiker	KTM	6	10	26
9	(Italy) Matteo del Coco	Husqvarna	11	6	25
10	(Estonia) Gert Krestinov	Honda	30	2	22
11	(France) Tom Guyon	Triumph	5	15	22
12	(Netherlands) Robert Fobbe	Kawasaki	12	9	21
13	(Netherlands) Joël van Mechelen	KTM	9	16	17
14	(Spain) Elias Escandell	Gas Gas	16	11	15
15	(Netherlands) Sven van der Mierden	Kawasaki	31	7	14
16	(Denmark) Jakob Kjær	KTM	8	Ret	13
17	(United Kingdom) Dan Thornhill	KTM	14	17	11
18	(Italy) Federico Tuani	Honda	22	14	7
19	(Netherlands) Loeka Thonies	KTM	17	19	6
20	(Netherlands) Kevin Buitenhuis	Yamaha	15	25	6
21	(Italy) Filippo Zonta	KTM	Ret	18	3
22	(France) Alexandre Viltard	Honda	18	21	3
23	(Netherlands) Teun Cooymans	Yamaha	19	27	2
24	(Sweden) Jesper Hansson	Husqvarna	Ret	20	1
25	(Germany) Fynn-Niklas Tornau	Husqvarna	20	22	1
	(Belgium) Dimitri Van de Sanden	Yamaha	21	28	0
	(Germany) Leon Rehberg	KTM	23	24	0
	(Sweden) Linus Grelsson	Honda	29	23	0
	(Netherlands) Erik de Bruyn	KTM	24	32	0
	(Belgium) Arno Van Mieghem	Honda	25	29	0
	(Japan) Yuki Okura	Honda	26	30	0
	(United Kingdom) Tom Grimshaw	Honda	Ret	26	0
	(Netherlands) Jaap Janssen	TM	27	33	0
	(Belgium) Yoran Moens	Husqvarna	28	34	0
	(Netherlands) Ryan Witlox	KTM	Ret	31	0
	(Netherlands) Henk Pater	Gas Gas	32	35	0
	(Belgium) Joe Vandereyt	Gas Gas	DNQ	36	0
	(Belgium) Tom Dukerts	KTM	Ret	Ret	0
	(Denmark) William Kleemann	KTM	Ret	Ret	0
	(Netherlands) Marcel Conijn	Yamaha	Ret	Ret	0
	(Netherlands) Micha-Boy de Waal	Gas Gas	Ret	DNS	0
	(Netherlands) Damian Wedage	KTM	DNQ	DNQ	0
	(Israel) Ben Almagor	KTM	DNQ	DNQ	0
	(Finland) Miro Varjonen	KTM	DNQ	DNQ	0
	(Sweden) Adam Einarsson	Yamaha	DNQ	DNQ	0
	(Belgium) Maeron Peeters	Husqvarna	DNQ	DNQ	0
	(Belgium) Joshua Feytons	Gas Gas	DNQ	DNQ	0
	(Netherlands) Krijn van Vroenhoven	KTM	DNQ	DNQ	0
	(Germany) Joshua Völker	Husqvarna	DNQ	DNQ	0
	(Belgium) Ryan Van Hove	Gas Gas	DNQ	DNQ	0
	(Belgium) Giles Goethals	Gas Gas	DNQ	DNQ	0
	(Netherlands) Freek Slapak	Husqvarna	DNQ	DNQ	0
	(Belgium) Arne Tielens	Honda	DNQ	DNQ	0
	(Germany) Marvin Pfeffer	KTM	DNQ	DNQ	0
	(United Kingdom) Harvey Cashmore	Honda	DNQ	DNQ	0
	(Germany) Dave Abbing	Triumph	DNQ	DNQ	0
	(Netherlands) Lex Mastenbroek	Gas Gas	DNQ	DNQ	0
Pos	Rider	Bike	BEL (Flanders)		Points

=== Manufacturers Championship ===
Pos	Bike	BEL (Flanders)		Points
1	Gas Gas	1	3	45
2	KTM	2	4	40
3	Husqvarna	7	1	39
4	Yamaha	3	8	33
5	Honda	18	2	25
6	Kawasaki	12	7	23
7	Triumph	5	15	22
	TM	27	33	0
Pos	Bike	BEL (Flanders)		Points

== EMX2T ==
A 1-round calendar for the 2025 season was announced on 8 January 2025. EMX2T is for riders competing on 2-stroke motorcycles of 250cc.

=== Calendar ===
Round	Date	Grand Prix	Location	Race 1 Winner	Race 2 Winner	Round Winner	Report
1	27 July	Czech Republic	Loket	(Finland) Sampo Rainio	(Czech Republic) Václav Kovář	(Czech Republic) Václav Kovář	

=== Entry list ===
Team	Constructor	No	Rider
F4E Gas Gas Racing Team	Gas Gas	6	(Spain) Elias Escandell
JG MotoproX Racing Team	Husqvarna	10	(Italy) Andrea Rossi
JG MotoproX Racing Team	KTM	90	(Czech Republic) Jiří Hendrych
JG MotoproX Racing Team	KTM	369	(Czech Republic) Marek Novák
BRS Racing Team	Fantic	13	(Sweden) Adam Fridlund
DM Racing	KTM	25	(Austria) Michael Lackner
Beta Racing Suomi	Beta	42	(Finland) Sampo Rainio
TKS Racing Team	KTM	44	(Czech Republic) Marek Krejčí
Team SevenSevenSix MX School	Husqvarna	85	(Germany) Lorenz Föhlisch
	KTM	98	(Netherlands) Dylan Kroon
Becker Racing	KTM	101	(Czech Republic) Václav Kovář
	KTM	104	(Czech Republic) Jindřich Slavík
Orion Racing Team	KTM	111	(Czech Republic) Petr Bartoš
Top Cross TCS Racing Team	KTM	117	(Romania) Zoltan Ördög
Care Innovation Racing Team	KTM	145	(Netherlands) Jeroen Bussink
Powerhouse Superstore Racing Team	Yamaha	164	(Netherlands) Remy van Alebeek
SMX Racing Team Rudnik	Gas Gas	171	(Czech Republic) Pavel Dvořáček
Zweiradsport Schmitz	Gas Gas	197	(Germany) Thomas Haas
	Beta	263	(Italy) Alfredo Memoli
Q Racing Team	Gas Gas	271	(Czech Republic) Stanislav Vašíček
JK Racing Yamaha	Yamaha	284	(Italy) Giorgio Orlando
	Husqvarna	290	(Germany) Joshua Völker
Caparvi Racing Team	Yamaha	311	(Italy) Mirko Dal Bosco
MCV Motorsport - TM Moto	TM	322	(Italy) Filippo Gervasio
	KTM	357	(Norway) Odin Ramseng Haseth
	Fantic	421	(Germany) Thomas Berger
	KTM	428	(Netherlands) Jelle Bankers
ZL N2P	KTM	472	(Czech Republic) Martin Závrský
Brouwer Motors	KTM	485	(Netherlands) Senna van Voorst
	Gas Gas	499	(Austria) Marco Heidegger
Motosports Racing Team	Husqvarna	511	(Latvia) Kārlis Kalējs
	KTM	521	(Netherlands) Boris Blanken
M.V. 532 Racing	Gas Gas	532	(Italy) Mirko Valsecchi
	KTM	537	(Netherlands) Damian Wedage
	Gas Gas	599	(Belgium) Nate van Tatenhove
KS Performance Austria Racing Team	Fantic	713	(Austria) Jürgen Lehner
Van der Wardt Bouw	TM	715	(Netherlands) Jaap Janssen
MXTZ SD Install Racing	KTM	719	(Czech Republic) Filip Matějec
723 Race Bikes Fantic	Fantic	792	(United Kingdom) Raife Broadley
De Nardo Racing Team	Yamaha	810	(France) Yann Crnjanski
	Gas Gas	811	(Netherlands) Lex Mastenbroek
	KTM	831	(Italy) Paolo Martorano
	Yamaha	879	(France) Edgard Moncel
KTM Kosak Team	Fantic	881	(Germany) Cedric Schick
Mecamotor KTM	KTM	938	(Brazil) Rodolfo Bicalho
Austria Suspension Racing	Fantic	991	(Austria) Marvin Salzer

=== Riders Championship ===
Pos	Rider	Bike	CZE (Czech Republic)		Points
1	(Czech Republic) Václav Kovář	KTM	2	1	47
2	(Italy) Andrea Rossi	Husqvarna	6	2	37
3	(Italy) Mirko Valsecchi	Gas Gas	4	4	36
4	(Spain) Elias Escandell	Gas Gas	3	6	35
5	(Finland) Sampo Rainio	Beta	1	14	32
6	(Sweden) Adam Fridlund	Fantic	10	3	31
7	(France) Yann Crnjanski	Yamaha	5	11	26
8	(Austria) Marvin Salzer	Fantic	12	5	25
9	(Italy) Alfredo Memoli	Beta	9	9	24
10	(Latvia) Markuss Kokins	Gas Gas	8	16	18
11	(Netherlands) Damian Wedage	KTM	16	10	16
12	(Italy) Paolo Martorano	KTM	26	7	14
13	(Latvia) Kārlis Kalējs	Husqvarna	7	24	14
14	(Czech Republic) Martin Závrský	KTM	27	8	13
15	(Czech Republic) Stanislav Vašíček	Gas Gas	17	13	12
16	(Netherlands) Boris Blanken	KTM	20	12	10
17	(Czech Republic) Marek Novák	KTM	11	21	10
18	(Czech Republic) Petr Bartoš	KTM	15	19	8
19	(Netherlands) Jeroen Bussink	KTM	13	DNS	8
20	(Austria) Michael Lackner	KTM	14	29	7
21	(Czech Republic) Pavel Dvořáček	Gas Gas	DNS	15	6
22	(Italy) Mirko Dal Bosco	Yamaha	Ret	17	4
23	(United Kingdom) Raife Broadley	Fantic	24	18	3
24	(Czech Republic) Jiří Hendrych	KTM	18	26	3
25	(Brazil) Rodolfo Bicalho	KTM	19	22	2
26	(Romania) Zoltan Ördög	KTM	Ret	20	1
	(Netherlands) Senna van Voorst	KTM	21	35	0
	(Germany) Joshua Völker	Husqvarna	22	23	0
	(Netherlands) Jelle Bankers	KTM	23	25	0
	(Netherlands) Jaap Janssen	TM	25	36	0
	(Netherlands) Dylan Kroon	KTM	35	27	0
	(Norway) Odin Ramseng Haseth	KTM	28	28	0
	(Czech Republic) Marek Krejcí	KTM	29	33	0
	(Austria) Jürgen Lehner	Fantic	31	30	0
	(Italy) Filippo Gervasio	TM	30	37	0
	(Germany) Thomas Haas	Gas Gas	33	31	0
	(Netherlands) Remy van Alebeek	Yamaha	32	32	0
	(Belgium) Nate van Tatenhove	Gas Gas	34	39	0
	(Czech Republic) Filip Matějec	KTM	DNQ	34	0
	(Germany) Cedric Schick	Fantic	36	38	0
	(Italy) Giorgio Orlando	Yamaha	Ret	Ret	0
	(Austria) Marco Heidegger	Gas Gas	DNQ	DNQ	0
	(France) Edgard Moncel	Yamaha	DNQ	DNQ	0
	(Czech Republic) Jindrich Slavík	KTM	DNQ	DNQ	0
	(Germany) Lorenz Föhlisch	Husqvarna	DNQ	DNQ	0
	(Germany) Thomas Berger	Fantic	DNQ	DNQ	0
	(Netherlands) Lex Mastenbroek	Gas Gas	DNQ	DNQ	0
Pos	Rider	Bike	CZE (Czech Republic)		Points

=== Manufacturers Championship ===
Pos	Bike	CZE (Czech Republic)		Points
1	KTM	2	1	47
2	Beta	1	9	37
3	Husqvarna	6	2	37
4	Gas Gas	4	4	36
5	Fantic	10	3	31
6	Yamaha	5	11	26
	TM	25	36	0
Pos	Bike	CZE (Czech Republic)		Points

== EMX85 ==
A 1-round calendar for the 2025 season was announced on 8 January 2025. EMX85 is for riders competing on 2-stroke motorcycles of 85cc.

=== Calendar ===
Round	Date	Grand Prix	Location	Race 1 Winner	Race 2 Winner	Round Winner	Report
1	27 July	Czech Republic	Loket	(France) Enzo Herzogenrath	(Estonia) Lucas Leok	(France) Enzo Herzogenrath	

=== Entry list ===
Team	Constructor	No	Rider
Pardi Racing KTM	KTM	9	(Serbia) Ana Kolnookov
Pardi Racing KTM	Husqvarna	234	(Italy) Liam Pichler
Pardi Racing KTM	KTM	295	(Italy) Antony Montoneri
Pardi Racing KTM	KTM	377	(Italy) Cristian Amali
	Husqvarna	200	(France) Louis Morette
Manetta Team	Husqvarna	203	(Italy) Pietro Riganti
MCV Motorsport - TM Moto	KTM	208	(Italy) Tommaso D'Amico
SB2 MX Talents	Gas Gas	216	(Spain) Celso Rodríguez
Dreams Racing	KTM	221	(Italy) Kevin Cantu
	KTM	225	(Italy) Nico Giacobbe
	KTM	228	(Italy) Ivan Marcovicchio
MotoXGeneration	Husqvarna	253	(Slovenia) Taj Golež
LGM Racing Team	Gas Gas	265	(Italy) Francesco Assini
Pavo Rueda Team	Gas Gas	274	(Spain) Santiago Cordero
Team TMX Competition	KTM	282	(France) Enzo Herzogenrath
Venum Bud Racing Kawasaki	Husqvarna	285	(France) Tim Lopes
Pro Factory Racing Team	Husqvarna	300	(France) Loan Torro
HSV Ried	Husqvarna	308	(Austria) Elias Felbermair
Tech 32	KTM	315	(France) Raphaël Mennillo
	Husqvarna	359	(France) Valentin Berjaud
618 MX Academy	KTM	366	(Italy) Dominick Maifredi
MotocrossCenter	Gas Gas	367	(Spain) Pau Caudet
Dirtbike MX Racing Team	KTM	397	(Slovenia) Alex Novak
Hutten Metaal AK Bouw Racing Junior Team	Husqvarna	400	(Netherlands) Kenzo Jaspers
	KTM	418	(Belgium) Torre Van Mechgelen
Altherm JCR Yamaha	Yamaha	426	(New Zealand) Nixon Coppins
JL Cox Motorsport	Gas Gas	455	(United Kingdom) Olly Waters
JL Cox Motorsport	Gas Gas	475	(United Kingdom) Cohen Jagielski
KTM Kosak Team	KTM	466	(Germany) Simon Hahn
	KTM	467	(United Kingdom) Arthur Moore
MRA Racing Team	Husqvarna	520	(Slovakia) Maxim Zimmerman
Chambers KTM Racing	KTM	525	(United Kingdom) Casey Lister
Yamaha NZ	Yamaha	543	(New Zealand) Jaggar Townley
Veidec Miba MX Team	KTM	567	(United Kingdom) Brian Gyles
TYK Team Yamaha Knobloch	Gas Gas	578	(Germany) Neo Nindelt
JMR Foundation/Dirt Store UK	KTM	581	(United Kingdom) Harley Marczak
KTM MX Futures	KTM	591	(Germany) Luca Nierychlo
KTM MX Futures	KTM	598	(United Kingdom) Harry Dale
KTM MX Futures	KTM	611	(Estonia) Lucas Leok
	Husqvarna	615	(Sweden) Max Lindström
LL Racing Team	KTM	622	(Estonia) Rasmus Näär
Estonian Motosport Academy	Husqvarna	683	(Estonia) Robin Robert Mooses
Forsell Motor	Husqvarna	684	(Sweden) Ebbe Callemo
	Gas Gas	700	(Estonia) Theo Kolts
MotoExtreme KTM Eesti	KTM	709	(Estonia) Gregor Lootus
Magmum MX	Gas Gas	712	(Latvia) Rainers Grasis
FF Racing Junior Academy	Gas Gas	736	(Sweden) Elliot Lord
Schmicker Racing	Husqvarna	751	(Latvia) Martins Cīrulis
Schmicker Racing	Husqvarna	771	(Latvia) Patriks Cīrulis
RR Nordic	Husqvarna	760	(Sweden) Charlie Schuman

=== Riders Championship ===
Pos	Rider	Bike	CZE (Czech Republic)		Points
1	(France) Enzo Herzogenrath	KTM	1	3	45
2	(Spain) Pau Caudet	Gas Gas	4	2	40
3	(New Zealand) Jaggar Townley	Yamaha	3	9	32
4	(Italy) Cristian Amali	KTM	2	13	30
5	(Sweden) Max Lindström	Husqvarna	6	8	28
6	(Estonia) Lucas Leok	KTM	DNS	1	25
7	(Estonia) Robin Robert Mooses	Husqvarna	14	4	25
8	(Germany) Luca Nierychlo	KTM	12	6	24
9	(Germany) Simon Hahn	KTM	5	16	21
10	(United Kingdom) Olly Waters	Gas Gas	11	11	20
11	(Italy) Dominick Maifredi	KTM	20	5	17
12	(Italy) Francesco Assini	Gas Gas	9	17	16
13	(Slovakia) Maxim Zimmerman	Husqvarna	8	18	16
14	(United Kingdom) Cohen Jagielski	Gas Gas	7	19	16
15	(Latvia) Patriks Cīrulis	Husqvarna	29	7	14
16	(Italy) Pietro Riganti	Husqvarna	15	14	13
17	(Sweden) Ebbe Callemo	Husqvarna	31	10	11
18	(Estonia) Gregor Lootus	KTM	19	12	11
19	(Italy) Tommaso D'Amico	KTM	10	Ret	11
20	(France) Loan Torro	Husqvarna	13	Ret	8
21	(United Kingdom) Harry Dale	KTM	28	15	6
22	(France) Valentin Berjaud	Husqvarna	16	28	5
23	(Belgium) Torre Van Mechgelen	KTM	17	27	4
24	(Latvia) Martins Cīrulis	Husqvarna	18	23	3
25	(Slovenia) Alex Novak	KTM	21	20	1
	(Italy) Liam Pichler	Husqvarna	22	21	0
	(Slovenia) Taj Golež	Husqvarna	Ret	22	0
	(Austria) Elias Felbermair	Husqvarna	23	31	0
	(Italy) Ivan Marcovicchio	KTM	24	26	0
	(Estonia) Rasmus Näär	KTM	30	24	0
	(United Kingdom) Arthur Moore	KTM	27	25	0
	(France) Louis Morette	Husqvarna	25	32	0
	(United Kingdom) Brian Gyles	KTM	26	DNS	0
	(New Zealand) Nixon Coppins	Yamaha	Ret	29	0
	(Italy) Nico Giacobbe	KTM	DNS	30	0
	(Spain) Santiago Cordero	Gas Gas	32	33	0
	(United Kingdom) Casey Lister	KTM	Ret	Ret	0
	(Latvia) Rainers Grasis	Gas Gas	Ret	DSQ	0
	(France) Tim Lopes	Husqvarna	Ret	DNS	0
	(Germany) Neo Nindelt	Gas Gas	Ret	DNS	0
	(United Kingdom) Harley Marczak	KTM	Ret	DNS	0
	(France) Rafaël Menillo	KTM	DNS	DNS	0
	(Sweden) Elliot Lord	Gas Gas	DNQ	DNQ	0
	(Italy) Kevin Cantu	KTM	DNQ	DNQ	0
	(Estonia) Theo Kolts	Gas Gas	DNQ	DNQ	0
	(Spain) Celso Rodríguez	Gas Gas	DNQ	DNQ	0
	(Sweden) Charlie Schuman	Husqvarna	DNQ	DNQ	0
	(Serbia) Ana Kolnookov	KTM	DNQ	DNQ	0
	(Italy) Antony Montoneri	KTM	DNQ	DNQ	0
	(Netherlands) Kenzo Jaspers	Husqvarna	DNQ	DNQ	0
Pos	Rider	Bike	CZE (Czech Republic)		Points

=== Manufacturers Championship ===
Pos	Bike	CZE (Czech Republic)		Points
1	KTM	1	1	50
2	Gas Gas	4	2	40
3	Husqvarna	6	4	33
4	Yamaha	3	9	32
Pos	Bike	CZE (Czech Republic)		Points

== EMX65 ==
A 1-round calendar for the 2025 season was announced on 8 January 2025. EMX65 is for riders competing on 2-stroke motorcycles of 65cc.

=== Calendar ===
Round	Date	Grand Prix	Location	Race 1 Winner	Race 2 Winner	Round Winner	Report
1	27 July	Czech Republic	Loket	(France) Mathys Agullo	(France) Mathys Agullo	(France) Mathys Agullo	

=== Entry list ===
Team	Constructor	No	Rider
Kippen MX Racing Team	Gas Gas	12	(Bulgaria) Nikolay Pavlov
	Gas Gas	77	(Bulgaria) Kristian Andreev
Dirtbike MX Racing Team	Gas Gas	146	(Bulgaria) Georgi Iliev
Pardi Racing KTM	KTM	209	(Italy) Adriano Carbonara
MTA MX Racing	KTM	212	(Italy) Riccardo Galia
MTA MX Racing	KTM	224	(Italy) Nicoló Fratacci
737 Performance KTM/D'stock 41	KTM	216	(France) Timoteï Cez
	KTM	219	(Italy) Daniel Corda
	Husqvarna	220	(France) Liam Morette
Manetta Team	Gas Gas	261	(Italy) Mattia Vertua
Bud Racing Academy	KTM	289	(France) Lucas Bos
DTWorks Bike/Ausio Racing Team	Yamaha	296	(Spain) Biel Vilalta
Motolabo Grenoble	Gas Gas	300	(France) Arthur Annelot
Aperio Academy	Husqvarna	303	(Italy) Brando Danesi
A2 Team - Barragán Racing	Gas Gas	311	(Spain) Izan Rodríguez
	Gas Gas	315	(Spain) Xavier Viciana
	KTM	328	(Croatia) David Dorčić
	KTM	331	(Italy) Pietro Piraccini
KTM Marseille	KTM	355	(France) Mathys Agullo
	Husqvarna	369	(Slovenia) Vid Rus
Sixlyon	Gas Gas	372	(Spain) Eleu José
	Gas Gas	392	(France) Jordan Cadenel
Centrac	KTM	394	(France) Ruben Serre
3 flo Madison Crescent Yamaha	Yamaha	412	(United Kingdom) Tommy Wood
Team SevenSevenSix MX School	Husqvarna	419	(Germany) Jesko Loberenz
Lexa MX Racing Team	KTM	421	(United Kingdom) Jack Clark
	Yamaha	456	(Netherlands) Marcio Laars
	Husqvarna	484	(Belgium) Cedric Fleerackers
	KTM	498	(Belgium) Tobe Vandeneynde
Gas Gas Belgium/Euromatec	Gas Gas	510	(Belgium) Oscar Goblet
A-Team We Race	Gas Gas	513	(Germany) Marlo Rach
Paez Racing	Gas Gas	517	(Netherlands) Demy Hermes
Trunk KTM	KTM	518	(United Kingdom) Max Jones
Cermen KTM Racing Team	KTM	523	(Czech Republic) Vojtěch Zendulka
	Husqvarna	529	(Netherlands) Luuk Klein Woolthuis
Mx Hoegaarden Racing Team	KTM	532	(Belgium) Jul Abts
	KTM	537	(Slovakia) Matej Masár
	Gas Gas	545	(Czech Republic) Milan Rubeš
Kenneth Gundersen MX Team	Husqvarna	561	(Norway) Håkon Rønning
EHR Racing/Dikker B.V.	Gas Gas	594	(Netherlands) Bas Verspaandonk
	Yamaha	606	(Finland) Felix Lind
	KTM	626	(Estonia) Aston Kõiv
	Husqvarna	629	(Estonia) Mikk Mihkel Sepp
	Husqvarna	641	(Latvia) Alans Bērziņš
KTL Racing	Gas Gas	659	(Estonia) Laur Kallikorm
MX for Life Stara Gwardia	Yamaha	712	(Poland) Tymon Andrzejewski
Motosports Racing Team	Husqvarna	773	(Latvia) Valters Jurcenko
	Yamaha	777	(Estonia) Karl Kristman
Amic Energy Sports Team	KTM	784	(Poland) Szymon Świderski
Rodeo Racing Team	Gas Gas	789	(Latvia) Rūdolfs Spila

=== Riders Championship ===
Pos	Rider	Bike	CZE (Czech Republic)		Points
1	(France) Mathys Agullo	KTM	1	1	50
2	(France) Liam Morette	Husqvarna	2	3	42
3	(Norway) Håkon Rønning	Husqvarna	3	5	36
4	(France) Arthur Annelot	Gas Gas	5	4	34
5	(Spain) Izan Rodríguez	Gas Gas	4	8	31
6	(France) Jordan Cadenel	Gas Gas	6	9	27
7	(Italy) Brando Danesi	Husqvarna	9	7	26
8	(Spain) Eleu José	Gas Gas	Ret	2	22
9	(France) Timoteï Cez	KTM	16	6	20
10	(Italy) Riccardo Galia	KTM	13	11	18
11	(Slovakia) Matej Masár	KTM	7	19	16
12	(Estonia) Karl Kristman	Yamaha	11	16	15
13	(Netherlands) Bas Verspaandonk	Gas Gas	8	Ret	13
14	(Estonia) Laur Kallikorm	Gas Gas	Ret	10	11
15	(France) Lucas Bos	KTM	10	27	11
16	(Italy) Mattia Vertua	Gas Gas	20	12	10
17	(Bulgaria) Kristian Andreev	Gas Gas	19	14	9
18	(Spain) Biel Vilalta	Yamaha	12	34	9
19	(Belgium) Tobe Vandeneynde	KTM	28	13	8
20	(United Kingdom) Tommy Wood	Yamaha	15	20	7
21	(Italy) Pietro Piraccini	KTM	14	28	7
22	(Estonia) Aston Kõiv	KTM	24	15	6
23	(Italy) Nicoló Fratacci	KTM	Ret	17	4
24	(Croatia) David Dorčić	KTM	17	32	4
25	(Bulgaria) Nikolay Pavlov	Gas Gas	22	18	3
26	(Poland) Tymon Andrzejewski	Yamaha	18	Ret	3
	(Czech Republic) Vojtěch Zendulka	KTM	27	21	0
	(Latvia) Alans Bērziņš	Husqvarna	21	29	0
	(Italy) Adriano Carbonara	KTM	31	22	0
	(Slovenia) Vid Rus	Husqvarna	26	23	0
	(Czech Republic) Milan Rubeš	Gas Gas	23	35	0
	(Estonia) Mikk Mihkel Sepp	Husqvarna	33	24	0
	(Belgium) Jul Abts	KTM	25	31	0
	(Netherlands) Demy Hermes	Gas Gas	Ret	25	0
	(Germany) Jesko Loberenz	Husqvarna	30	26	0
	(Bulgaria) Georgi Illiev	Gas Gas	29	Ret	0
	(Latvia) Rūdolfs Spila	Gas Gas	Ret	30	0
	(Italy) Daniel Corda	KTM	32	DSQ	0
	(France) Ruben Serre	KTM	Ret	33	0
	(Germany) Marlo Rach	Gas Gas	34	Ret	0
	(Latvia) Valters Jurcenko	Husqvarna	DNQ	DNQ	0
	(United Kingdom) Jack Clark	KTM	DNQ	DNQ	0
	(Poland) Szymon Świderski	KTM	DNQ	DNQ	0
	(Belgium) Oscar Goblet	Gas Gas	DNQ	DNQ	0
	(Netherlands) Marcio Laars	Yamaha	DNQ	DNQ	0
	(United Kingdom) Max Jones	KTM	DNQ	DNQ	0
	(Spain) Xavier Viciana	Gas Gas	DNQ	DNQ	0
	(Netherlands) Luuk Klein Woolthuis	Husqvarna	DNQ	DNQ	0
	(Belgium) Cedric Fleerackers	Husqvarna	DNQ	DNQ	0
	(Finland) Felix Lind	Yamaha	DNQ	DNQ	0
Pos	Rider	Bike	CZE (Czech Republic)		Points

=== Manufacturers Championship ===
Pos	Bike	CZE (Czech Republic)		Points
1	KTM	1	1	50
2	Husqvarna	2	3	42
3	Gas Gas	4	2	40
4	Yamaha	11	16	15
Pos	Bike	CZE (Czech Republic)		Points
