= Vincenzo Bove =

Italian political economist

- Education: Birkbeck, University of London
- Scientific career
- Fields: Political economy; Civil–military relations; Defence economics; Conflict and peace studies
- Workplaces: IMT School for Advanced Studies Lucca; University of Warwick; RAND Europe
- Thesis: (2011)
- Website: www.imtlucca.it/vincenzo.bove

Vincenzo Bove is an Italian political economist and Professor of Economics at the IMT School for Advanced Studies Lucca. He is also an Honorary Professor of Political Science at the University of Warwick and a Senior Research Fellow at RAND Europe. His research focuses on political economy, civil–military relations, defence economics, international migration, military intervention and terrorism.

In 2026, Bove received a nearly €2 million European Research Council (ERC) Advanced Grant for research on the military recruitment crisis in Europe.

== Education and career ==
Before entering academia, Bove served as an officer in the Italian Navy, principally working in anti-submarine warfare.

He received a PhD in economics from Birkbeck, University of London in 2011.

Bove has held teaching and research appointments at the University of Essex, the University of Genoa, the University of Naples Federico II, Ca' Foscari University of Venice and Sciences Po in Paris.

He joined the Department of Politics and International Studies at the University of Warwick in 2014, where he became Professor of Political Science in 2019. He subsequently joined the IMT School for Advanced Studies Lucca as Professor of Economics and a member of its AXES research group, while retaining an honorary professorship at Warwick.

Bove's research has received funding from the AXA Research Fund, the British Academy, the Economic and Social Research Council (ESRC), the Folke Bernadotte Academy, the Swedish Research Council, UNU-WIDER and the World Bank.

He has also been affiliated with the Centre for Economic Policy Research.

== Research ==
Bove's research applies quantitative methods to questions in the political economy of conflict and security. His work has addressed civil–military relations, military expenditure, international migration, military interventions, terrorism, policing and United Nations peacekeeping.

With Chiara Ruffa and Andrea Ruggeri, he co-authored Composing Peace: Mission Composition in UN Peacekeeping, published by Oxford University Press in 2020. The book examines how the composition of multinational peacekeeping missions affects their operation and effectiveness.

His research has appeared in several peer-reviewed journals including the American Journal of Political Science, British Journal of Political Science, Journal of Conflict Resolution, Journal of Peace Research, The Journal of Politics, Journal of Development Economics, Journal of Economic Geography, World Development and American Economic Journal: Economic Policy.

=== Oil and military intervention ===
In research with Kristian Skrede Gleditsch and Petros G. Sekeris, Bove examined the economic motivations behind third-party military intervention in civil wars. Their article, "Oil Above Water: Economic Interdependence and Third-party Intervention", was first published online in the Journal of Conflict Resolution in 2015 and appeared in print in 2016.

The study found that the probability of external military intervention increased when the country at war possessed substantial oil reserves, when competition among oil producers was limited and when the potential intervening country had greater demand for oil. The findings received international media attention. The Independent reported that intervention in civil wars was substantially more likely in oil-rich countries, while Bove and Sekeris discussed the findings in The Washington Post. The research was also covered by Newsweek.

=== Police militarization ===
In a 2017 study with Evelina Gavrilova, Bove examined the effects of the transfer of surplus military equipment to local police departments in the United States. The research received attention during debate over the Trump administration's decision to restore transfers of surplus military equipment to police departments, including coverage in The New York Times, The Washington Post, The Wall Street Journal and The Economist.

His research on police militarization was also discussed in The Guardian and Wired during the 2020 debate over the militarization of American police forces.

=== Migration and terrorism ===
Bove has also studied the relationship between international migration and terrorism. Research in this area was covered by The Washington Post in 2016 in connection with evidence concerning the relationship between immigration and terrorist activity.

=== Conscription and military recruitment ===
Bove's recent research has examined military conscription, institutional trust and recruitment challenges in European armed forces. With Riccardo Di Leo and Marco Giani, he studied the effects of conscription on trust in public institutions in an article published in the American Journal of Political Science. The study found lower institutional trust among men drafted shortly before conscription was abolished than among comparable cohorts exempted afterward. The authors later discussed the renewed debate over conscription in a CEPR VoxEU column and reviewed its broader economic and social effects for the Economics Observatory. Bove's work on conscription and military recruitment has also been covered by Euronews, including interviews on the revival of compulsory service and recruitment shortages across Europe.

== ERC Advanced Grant ==
In June 2026, Bove was awarded an ERC Advanced Grant for SOS – Short on Strength: The Military Recruitment Crisis in Europe, a research project hosted by the IMT School for Advanced Studies Lucca.

The project received nearly €2 million in funding through the European Union's Horizon Europe programme. It examines why European armed forces face difficulties recruiting and retaining personnel and includes comparative research across European countries on the demographic, socioeconomic and attitudinal factors associated with military service.

Bove's project was one of nineteen ERC Advanced Grants awarded to researchers based in Italy in the 2026 funding round.

== Selected works ==
=== Book ===
- Bove, Vincenzo; Ruffa, Chiara; Ruggeri, Andrea (2020). Composing Peace: Mission Composition in UN Peacekeeping. Oxford: Oxford University Press. ISBN 9780198790655.

=== Articles ===
- Bove, Vincenzo; Elia, Leandro (2011). "Supplying Peace: Participation in and Troop Contribution to Peacekeeping Missions". Journal of Peace Research. 48 (6).
- Bove, Vincenzo; Gavrilova, Evelina (2017). "Police Officer on the Frontline or a Soldier? The Effect of Police Militarization on Crime". American Economic Journal: Economic Policy. 9 (3).
- Bove, Vincenzo; Efthyvoulou, Georgios; Pickard, Harry (2022). "Did Terrorism Affect Voting in the Brexit Referendum?". British Journal of Political Science. 52 (3): 1133–1150.
- Bove, Vincenzo; Elia, Leandro; Ferraresi, Massimiliano (2023). "Immigration, Fear of Crime, and Public Spending on Security". The Journal of Law, Economics, and Organization. 39 (1): 235–280.
- Bove, Vincenzo; Di Salvatore, Jessica; Nisticò, Roberto (2023). "Economic Sanctions and Trade Flows in the Neighborhood". The Journal of Law and Economics. 66 (4): 671–697.
- Bove, Vincenzo; Efthyvoulou, Georgios; Pickard, Harry (2024). "Are the Effects of Terrorism Short-Lived?". British Journal of Political Science. 54 (2): 536–545.
- Bove, Vincenzo; Di Leo, Riccardo; Giani, Marco (2024). "Military Culture and Institutional Trust: Evidence from Conscription Reforms across Europe". American Journal of Political Science. 68 (2).
