= Kay Karssemakers =

Dutch motocross racer

- Nationality: Dutch
- Born: 18 June 2004 (age 22) Boxtel, The Netherlands

Motocross career
- Years active: 2019–present
- Teams: Diga Racing (2019); Yamaha Europe EMX125 MJC (2020); SKS Husqvarna Racing Team (2021); Hitachi KTM fuelled by Milwaukee (2022); Husqvarna BT Racing Team (2023); Fantic Factory Racing MX2 (2024); Dixon Racing Team Kawasaki (2025–)

Kay Karssemakers (born 18 June 2004) is a Dutch professional Motocross racer. Karssemakers has competed in the Motocross World Championship since the 2022 season.

Karssemakers had a successful career across the smaller capacity classes as a junior rider, prior to turning pro. He won four national titles from 50cc-85cc classes and podiumed in the European Motocross Championship and the FIM Motocross Junior World Championship. In 2015, he won the 65 class at the FIM Junior World Championship, known during that season as the European Open 65.

In 2022, he moved straight from EMX125 to the MX2 class of the Motocross World Championship. In 2023, he moved back to EMX competition, competing in the EMX250 class of the 2023 European Motocross Championship where he finished as runner-up.

Karssemakers competed for seven different teams between the 2019 and 2025 seasons.

== Career ==
=== Junior career ===
After starting in the sport at a young age, Karssemakers progressed through the junior ranks in The Netherlands and around Europe. Karssemakers enjoyed success aboard 65cc motorcycles, becoming national champion in the small wheel class in 2013 and the big wheel class in 2014. He also qualified for the EMX65 class of the European Motocross Championship in 2014, where he finished eighth overall and made his debut in the FIM Motocross Junior World Championship. Karssemakers' upward trend internationally continued in 2015, where he won the opening race at the EMX65 final and ultimately finished second overall, with the same points as the champion Scott Smulders. He would go one better at the FIM Junior World Championship in Spain, where he took a double race win to become champion in what was known as the European Open 65 class for 2015. Domestically, Karssemakers had already started competing on an 85cc motorcycle, where he won the national title as well in 2015.

Karssemakers moved to an 85cc motorcycle full-time for 2016, where he was runner-up in the Open Dutch Championship, as well as finishing thirteenth in the FIM Junior Worlds and twenty-second in the EMX85 class. In 2017, Karssemakers finished runner-up to Kay de Wolf in the 85cc class of the Dutch Masters of Motocross and the 85cc Big Wheel class of the Open Dutch Championship. He was able to take the bronze medal at the FIM Junior Worlds, after strong performances in the two races. Karssemakers repeated his third in the Junior World Championship in 2018, his back-to-back bronze medal being combined with fourth overall in the EM85 class of the 2018 European Motocross Championship.

Karssemakers signed for the KTM Diga Junior Racing Team to make his debut in the EMX125 class for the 2019 European Motocross Championship. He scored four top-ten race finishes and ended the championship in sixteenth. Following this, Karssemakers was brought into Yamaha's official team for EMX125 class of the 2020 European Motocross Championship. He would, however, miss the first four rounds of the COVID-19 pandemic-impacted season, returning for the second half of the championship but only finishing in the top-ten twice. For his final year aboard a 125, Karssemakers was on the move again, this time joining the SKS Husqvarna team. The team itself was set up as an official development team for the Dutch federation and the move saw Karssemakers finish fourth in the final standings of the EMX125 class in the 2021 European Motocross Championship. In a consistent season, he was able to finish third overall at the second round in Italy, scoring his only overall podium in EMX125. The FIM Junior World Championship was held in Greece for 2021 and Karssemakers was able to finish third in the 125 class, adding to the two bronze medals he had taken as an 85 rider earlier in his career.

=== 250 Career ===
==== 2022 ====
Kay Karssemakers at the 2022 World Motocross Championship in Spain.

Karssemakers signed for the British-based Hitachi KTM fuelled by Milwaukee team for the 2022 season, in a move that saw him leapfrog from EMX125 straight into the MX2 class of the 2022 FIM Motocross World Championship. After a consistent points scoring performance at the opening round, an injury picked up at the second grand prix saw him miss the following three rounds. Upon his return, Karssemakers was consistently in the top-fifteen, with six top-ten race finishes being the highlights. At the Indonesian round, in a depleted field, he was able to finish sixth in the second race and eighth overall in the event. He debut world championship campaign saw him finish fourteenth in the final standings, two places behind his teammate Isak Gifting. Karssemakers also competed in the MX2 class of the 2022 British Motocross Championship, where he took three overall podium finishes from the five rounds he contested.

==== 2023 ====
With the Hitachi team closing its doors over the winter, Karssemakers was again on the move for the 2023 season, this time finding a home with the Husqvarna BT Racing Team. The move would see Karssemakers step back down to the EMX250 class of the 2023 European Motocross Championship, where he scored eight podium finishes across the ten round championship and ultimately finished runner-up in the final standings behind Andrea Bonacorsi. Included within this was his only race win in the EMX250 class, coming in the second race at the Latvian round, held at the same track he had experienced success on in EMX65. He also had a strong season in the 2023 Dutch Masters of Motocross, finishing fifth in the final standings.

==== 2024 ====
Karssemakers returned to MX2 for the 2024 FIM Motocross World Championship, signing for the Fantic Factory Racing team. The Dutchman had an injury hit offseason, first breaking his collarbone in December 2023 before fracturing his sternum closer to the start of the season, resulting in him missing the opening round. The remainder of the championship was challenging for Karssemakers, as engine problems for both himself and team mater David Braceras resulting in several retirements. An arm injury at the Czech round saw him miss the following events in Belgium and Sweden to add to this. Karssemakers ended the championship in eighteenth, with two top-ten race finishes being the highlights.

==== 2025 ====
Leaving Fantic behind, Karssemakers initially signed for the Haaz Racing Team for the 2025 FIM Motocross World Championship. However, the partnership ended close to the start of the season due to the team not delivering on its promises. This left Karssemakers in a difficult position and once the season began he found himself looking for a fill-in ride at best. With the help of his sponsors, he raced at two mid-season grand prix in Germany and Great Britain aboard a Kawasaki. From the Czech round onwards, Karssemakers joined the Dixon Racing Team and finished the season with several strong results, including seventh in the second race at the final round in Australia.

==== 2026 ====
For the first time in his career since first competing on a 125, Karssemakers did not change teams during the offseason, remaining with the Dixon Racing team for the 2026 FIM Motocross World Championship. This new consistency in his career brought his best MX2 class results to date, finishing in the top-ten overall at eleven of the nineteen contested rounds. His final three rounds of the championship were noteworthy as he finished in the top-six overall across all, with fifth overall at the Turkish round being his highpoint. Karssemakers ended the season in tenth in the final standings, the first time he had finished in the top-ten of the final standings at world championship level. In addition, he also finished third in the final standings of the 2026 Dutch Masters of Motocross in the 250cc class.

==== 2027 ====
In the closing stages of the 2026 season, it was announced that Karssemakers would stay with the Dixon Racing Team for a further season in 2027.

== Honours ==
FIM Motocross Junior World Championship

- 125: 2021 (bronze)
- 85: 2017 & 2018 (bronze)
- European Open 65: 2015 (gold)

European Motocross Championship

- EMX250: 2023 (silver)
- EMX65: 2015 (silver)

Dutch Masters of Motocross

- 250cc: 2026 (bronze)
- 85cc: 2017 (silver)

Open Dutch Championship

- 125cc: 2019 (silver)
- 85cc Big Wheel: 2016, 2017 & 2018 (silver)
- 85cc Small Wheel: 2015 (gold)
- 65cc Big Wheel: 2014 (gold)
- 65cc Small Wheel: 2013 (gold)
- 50cc: 2011 (gold)

== Career statistics ==
=== FIM Motocross World Championship ===
==== By season ====
Season	Class	Number	Motorcycle	Team	Race	Race Wins	Overall Wins	Race Top-3	Overall Podium	Pts	Plcd
2022	MX2	33	KTM	Hitachi KTM fuelled by Milwaukee	28	0	0	0	0	195	14th
2024	MX2	33	Fantic	Fantic Factory Racing MX2	33	0	0	0	0	173	18th
2025	MX2	33	Kawasaki	Kawasaki Nederland/Abrex Logistics	4	0	0	0	0	115	21st
2025	MX2	33	Kawasaki	Bike It Kawasaki Racing Team	14	0	0	0	0	115	21st
2026	MX2	33	Kawasaki	Dixon Racing Team Kawasaki	37	0	0	0	0	388	10th
Total					116	0	0	0	0	871	
