= 2023 European Motocross Championship =

Motocross Competition in 2023

The 2023 European Motocross Championship was the 35th European Motocross Championship season since it was revived in 1988. It included 14 events and 6 different classes. It started at Sardinia on 26 March, and ended in Great Britain on 1 October. All rounds acted as support classes at the European rounds of the 2023 MXGP.

== EMX250 ==
A 10-round calendar for the 2023 season was announced on 10 November 2022. EMX250 was for riders competing on 2-stroke and 4-stroke motorcycles between 175cc-250cc. Only riders under the age of 21 were allowed to compete.

=== Calendar ===
Round	Date	Grand Prix	Location	Race 1 Winner	Race 2 Winner	Round Winner	Report
1	26 March	Sardinia	Riola Sardo	(Italy) Andrea Bonacorsi	(Italy) Andrea Bonacorsi	(Italy) Andrea Bonacorsi	
2	16 April	Trentino	Pietramurata	(Italy) Andrea Bonacorsi	(Italy) Valerio Lata	(Italy) Valerio Lata	
3	30 April	Portugal	Agueda	(Italy) Andrea Bonacorsi	(France) Marc-Antoine Rossi	(Italy) Andrea Bonacorsi	
4	7 May	Spain	intu Xanadú	(Italy) Andrea Bonacorsi	(Netherlands) Cas Valk	(Netherlands) Cas Valk	
5	4 June	Latvia	Ķegums	(Netherlands) Ivano van Erp	(Netherlands) Kay Karssemakers	(Netherlands) Ivano van Erp	
6	11 June	Germany	Teutschenthal	(Italy) Ferruccio Zanchi	(France) Marc-Antoine Rossi	(France) Marc-Antoine Rossi	
7	13 August	Sweden	Uddevalla	(Netherlands) Cas Valk	(Netherlands) Cas Valk	(Netherlands) Cas Valk	
8	20 August	Netherlands	Arnhem	(Italy) Ferruccio Zanchi	(Netherlands) Cas Valk	(Italy) Andrea Bonacorsi	
9	3 September	Turkey	Afyonkarahisar	(Netherlands) Cas Valk	(Italy) Andrea Bonacorsi	(Italy) Andrea Bonacorsi	
10	1 October	Great Britain	Matterley Basin	(France) Marc-Antoine Rossi	(Italy) Ferruccio Zanchi	(France) Marc-Antoine Rossi	

=== Entry list ===
Team	Constructor	No	Rider	Rounds
Team VRT KTM Factory Juniors	KTM	2	(Italy) Ferruccio Zanchi	All
Team VRT KTM Factory Juniors	KTM	110	(New Zealand) Rian King	10
Team VRT KTM Factory Juniors	KTM	282	(France) Marc-Antoine Rossi	1–6, 10
SM Action KTM Racing Team Yuasa Battery	KTM	3	(Italy) Federico Tuani	1–8
SM Action KTM Racing Team Yuasa Battery	KTM	669	(Italy) Luca Ruffini	1, 7–10
Mequitec Gas Gas Racing Team	Gas Gas	4	(Spain) Gerard Congost	2–8, 10
Mequitec Gas Gas Racing Team	Gas Gas	29	(Spain) Francisco García	1, 8
Mequitec Gas Gas Racing Team	Gas Gas	68	(Spain) Samuel Nilsson	1–5, 7–8, 10
	KTM	7	(Turkey) Mehmet Emin Musaoglu	9
Star Racing Team	KTM	11	(Turkey) Ömer Uçum	9
Star Racing Team	Yamaha	157	(Turkey) Ata Kuzu	9
CEC Racing	Husqvarna	14	(Sweden) Nike Korsbeck	7
Team Seven Motorsport	KTM	318	(Italy) Giuseppe Zangari	2
Bloody Harry Energy RGS MX Team	Husqvarna	17	(Belgium) Junior Bal	8
WZ Racing Team	KTM	19	(Latvia) Martins Platkēvičs	5
WZ Racing Team	KTM	131	(Germany) Cato Nickel	1–4, 7, 10
WZ Racing Team	KTM	262	(Australia) Ryan Alexanderson	10
Team Giorgio	Gas Gas	20	(France) Toni Giorgessi	4
KTM Motofavorīts MX Team	KTM	21	(Latvia) Rauls Blūmfelds	1, 5
Pardi Racing KTM	KTM	25	(Italy) Alessandro Sadovschi	4, 6
Boutaca Racing Team	KTM	28	(Portugal) Pedro Rino	3
KTM SB Racing Team	KTM	36	(Switzerland) Nico Greutmann	1–4, 7–8
KTM SB Racing Team	KTM	489	(Netherlands) Jens Walvoort	1–8, 10
Hutten Metaal Yamaha Official EMX250 Team	Yamaha	32	(Italy) Andrea Bonacorsi	1–9
Hutten Metaal Yamaha Official EMX250 Team	Yamaha	47	(Latvia) Kārlis Reišulis	1–6, 9–10
Hutten Metaal Yamaha Official EMX250 Team	Yamaha	432	(Netherlands) Ivano van Erp	1–8
Husqvarna BT Racing Team	Husqvarna	33	(Netherlands) Kay Karssemakers	All
Husqvarna BT Racing Team	Husqvarna	83	(France) Maxime Grau	All
Husqvarna BT Racing Team	Husqvarna	288	(Argentina) Ignacio Liprandi	3
Husqvarna BT Racing Team	Husqvarna	563	(Belgium) Wesly Dieudonné	1, 5–10
GT Racing	KTM	34	(France) Bogdan Krajewski	1, 3, 5–6
HPM Racing	Gas Gas	39	(Denmark) Victor Voxen Kleemann	6, 8
SR42 KTM Racing Team	KTM	42	(Finland) Sampo Rainio	5, 7
Sturm STC Racing	Gas Gas	43	(Latvia) Roberts Lūsis	1, 5–6, 8
Scoccia Racing Team	Kawasaki	44	(Italy) Pietro Razzini	1–2, 8
KKR	KTM	48	(Latvia) Kristofers Kauliņš	10
KTM Beddini MX2	KTM	53	(Italy) Valerio Lata	All
SixtySeven Racing Team	Husqvarna	57	(Latvia) Edvards Bidzāns	2, 5–7
MX Moduls	Yamaha	61	(Latvia) Mairis Pumpurs	5–7, 10
KTM Kosak Team	KTM	70	(Germany) Valentin Kees	2
KTM Kosak Team	KTM	252	(Germany) Paul Bloy	2, 6
KTM Kosak Team	KTM	568	(Sweden) Max Pålsson	1, 5–7, 10
FlyOver Competition Gaerne	Kawasaki	71	(Italy) Morgan Bennati	4, 6, 8
De Baets Yamaha Racing Team	Yamaha	75	(Netherlands) Bradley Mesters	1, 10
Alf Graarud Motor Yamaha Scandinavia	Yamaha	87	(Norway) Elias Auclair	7
Ghidinelli Racing	Yamaha	88	(Italy) Matteo Luigi Russi	1–6
STC Sturm Racing Team	Yamaha	90	(Germany) Justin Trache	2
Team Salgueiro	Yamaha	91	(Portugal) Francisco Salgueiro	3
Jezyk Racing Team	KTM	373	(Spain) Edgar Canet	1–2, 6–10
MX Specialized	Gas Gas	111	(Spain) Lucas Bodega	4
Vema Beton	Gas Gas	114	(Belgium) Nicolas Vennekens	All
Husqvarna Motorcycles Slovenia	Husqvarna	123	(Slovenia) Jaka Peklaj	10
Best Matic Team	Kawasaki	140	(Italy) Tommaso Lodi	2, 4, 6
Team Yamaha Alves Bandeira	Yamaha	141	(Portugal) Afonso Gomes	3
	KTM	144	(Netherlands) Jelle Bankers	1, 8
DS Launir	Yamaha	149	(Iceland) Eiður Orri Pálmarsson	10
	KTM	151	(Turkey) Mehmet Yiğit Kara	9
Carpavi Racing Team	Yamaha	153	(Italy) Riccardo Bindi	2, 5–6
	Kawasaki	158	(Turkey) Beytullah Gurur	9
ASA United GasGas	Gas Gas	163	(United Kingdom) Ben Mustoe	10
HM Racing Team	Husqvarna	171	(Germany) Fynn-Niklas Tornau	2, 6, 8
Fantic Factory Team Maddii	Fantic	172	(Netherlands) Cas Valk	All
Fantic Factory Team Maddii	Fantic	312	(Norway) Håkon Østerhagen	7–9
Fantic Factory Team Maddii	Fantic	717	(France) Alexis Fueri	All
FRT Motorsport	Husqvarna	191	(Italy) Davide Della Valle	2, 6, 8
Ausio Racing Team	Yamaha	208	(Spain) Eric Tomás	3
Team VHR Racing	Gas Gas	207	(France) Xavier Cazal	All
HTS KTM	KTM	214	(Hungary) Bence Pergel	1–2
Schmicker Racing Team	KTM	220	(Estonia) Martin Michelis	1, 5
	Yamaha	221	(Turkey) Efe Kemal Hid	9
Team JCR & Katharsis	Kawasaki	232	(Spain) Unai Aguiló	4
Team Castellari	Gas Gas	247	(Italy) Giovanni Meneghello	2
Wozniak MX Racing Team	Yamaha	256	(Denmark) Magnus Smith	6
Kenneth Gundersen MX Team	Yamaha	259	(Norway) Martin Bredesen	5
Motorrad Bauerschmidt	Husqvarna	275	(Germany) Eric Rakow	6
Momento TT Motos	Gas Gas	291	(Portugal) Fábio Costa	3–4
LF Motorsport	Yamaha	301	(France) Noah Vampa	2–3
	Gas Gas	302	(Turkey) Yiğit Ali Selek	9
9MM Energy Drink BUD Racing	Kawasaki	304	(Australia) Liam Owens	3–4
9MM Energy Drink BUD Racing	Kawasaki	319	(France) Quentin Prugnières	All
9MM Energy Drink BUD Racing	Kawasaki	339	(Chile) Benjamin Garib	7–10
Husqvarna Spain	Husvqvarna	305	(Spain) Antonio Gallego	3–4
Falcon Motorsports	KTM	306	(Germany) Julian Duvier	6–8
Polaris Nordmøre Motocross	KTM	357	(Norway) Odin Ramseng Haseth	7
GRMXPRO	Husqvarna	368	(Spain) Unai Larrañaga	4
JSL 83 Kawasaki Toulon	Kawasaki	371	(France) Paolo Maschio	2–4
Nilssons MC Gas Gas	Honda	397	(Sweden) Axel Nilsson	7
Laurense Motors Kawasaki	Kawasaki	401	(Netherlands) Lotte van Drunen	10
KMP Honda Racing	Honda	408	(Netherlands) Scott Smulders	2
Matt Gardiner MX KTM Race Team	KTM	410	(United Kingdom) James Barker	2, 8
Brouwer KTM	KTM	411	(Netherlands) Kjeld Stuurman	1, 8
Joyride MX	KTM	417	(Belgium) Hugo Buchelot	6, 8, 10
GRT Impact KTM	KTM	419	(United Kingdom) Joe Brookes	6–7, 10
FM Max Bart Racing	KTM	420	(Italy) Andrea Rossi	1–3, 5–6, 8
Maggiora Park Racing Team	KTM	421	(Italy) Eugenio Barbaglia	1
Becker Racing	KTM	440	(Germany) Marnique Appelt	6
GTCI Revo Kawasaki	Kawasaki	441	(United Kingdom) Billy Askew	10
OneClick Suspension Honda Eesti	Honda	454	(Estonia) Mikk Martin Lõhmus	5
	Yamaha	456	(Norway) Mathias Kjørstad	7–8
Grizzly Racing Service	Husqvarna	469	(Netherlands) Ryan de Beer	8, 10
Jø Honda Racing	Honda	474	(Denmark) Magnus Gregersen	2
AMX Racing Team	Husqvarna	474	(Denmark) Magnus Gregersen	7–8
	Husqvarna	517	(Italy) Pablo Caspani	2
RX Moto Oy Husqvarna Nordic	Husqvarna	524	(Finland) Miro Varjonen	5, 7
Motorace	Husqvarna	525	(Portugal) Afonso Simoẽs	3
	KTM	555	(United Kingdom) Cole McCullough	8
DK Offroad	KTM	556	(United Kingdom) McKenzie Marshall	10
Motostar Racing	Yamaha	560	(Sweden) Liam Åkerlund	7
MoenREC Racing by Forsell Motor	Husqvarna	567	(Sweden) Rasmus Moen	1–2, 5–8
NR Service Racing Team	Gas Gas	586	(Denmark) Lucas Søndergaard	7
KTM Silve Racing	KTM	595	(Finland) Eliel Lehtinen	5–6
KTM Silve Racing	KTM	737	(Finland) Joona Kukkonen	5
Motor2000 KTM Racing Team	KTM	601	(United Kingdom) Kelton Gwyther	1–3, 7–10
Pol Motors	Gas Gas	612	(Estonia) Joosep Parn	2, 5–7
TALK Templant Racing Team	KTM	616	(United Kingdom) Ollie Colmer	1–2, 6
Steels Dr. Jack TM Racing	TM	651	(Estonia) Meico Vettik	1–7
STS Stocker Racing	Fantic	661	(Belgium) Pako Destercq	4
Lexa MX Racing Team	Husqvarna	684	(Latvia) Uldis Freibergs	7
EHR Racing	Husqvarna	710	(South Africa) Calum Marriott	4
Forsell Motor Racing Team	Husqvarna	727	(Sweden) Marcus Gredinger	7
Chambers Racing	Husqvarna	731	(United Kingdom) Alfie Jones	2
MX-Handel Racing	Husqvarna	733	(Estonia) Kaarel Tilk	5
	KTM	743	(Sweden) Filip Hagdahl	6–7
	KTM	744	(France) Saad Soulimani	1–3
Schepers Racing	KTM	880	(Netherlands) Sven Dijk	8
Mecamotor KTM	KTM	938	(Brazil) Rodolfo Bicalho	6–7

=== Riders Championship ===
Pos	Rider	Bike	SAR (Sardinia)		TRE		POR (Portugal)		ESP (Spain)		LAT (Latvia)		GER (Germany)		SWE (Sweden)		NED (Netherlands)		TUR (Turkey)		GBR (United Kingdom)		Points
1	(Italy) Andrea Bonacorsi	Yamaha	1	1	1	2	1	3	1	6	2	5	2	3	2	2	2	2	4	1			393
2	(Netherlands) Kay Karssemakers	Husqvarna	5	2	6	9	3	2	5	2	3	1	6	2	4	6	5	3	5	2	7	7	362
3	(Netherlands) Cas Valk	Fantic	2	5	8	6	7	8	3	1	10	Ret	10	5	1	1	8	1	1	5	2	9	339
4	(Italy) Ferruccio Zanchi	KTM	7	18	3	5	2	6	4	9	5	6	1	9	5	25	1	10	2	11	6	1	312
5	(Italy) Valerio Lata	KTM	6	8	2	1	10	10	DNS	DNS	12	9	8	4	12	5	10	4	3	4	5	3	277
6	(France) Quentin Prugnières	Kawasaki	3	3	19	18	4	5	Ret	5	8	10	5	8	3	8	3	7	7	3	Ret	6	264
7	(France) Marc-Antoine Rossi	KTM	13	6	4	7	11	1	2	7	11	3	4	1							1	2	246
8	(Latvia) Kārlis Reišulis	Yamaha	11	14	5	4	13	4	9	3	4	4	9	7					8	8	3	4	235
9	(Netherlands) Ivano van Erp	Yamaha	4	4	10	8	21	9	18	4	1	2	3	6	6	Ret	Ret	DNS					190
10	(France) Maxime Grau	Husqvarna	16	30	13	3	20	11	7	8	20	13	7	22	10	12	Ret	23	10	12	4	5	168
11	(France) Alexis Fueri	Fantic	8	9	7	14	6	Ret	6	15	36	DNS	18	24	7	4	7	8	23	7	Ret	Ret	158
12	(Italy) Federico Tuani	KTM	9	12	20	13	12	13	15	10	16	12	11	15	11	7	6	5					149
13	(Spain) Samuel Nilsson	Gas Gas	Ret	DNS	11	Ret	5	15	11	12	13	DNS			8	Ret	19	12			11	12	102
14	(Switzerland) Nico Greutmann	KTM	19	13	12	19	9	12	10	14					13	9	13	11					98
15	(France) Xavier Cazal	Gas Gas	14	11	27	15	Ret	17	19	16	19	15	14	10	24	22	15	16	13	10	15	Ret	96
16	(Estonia) Meico Vettik	TM	Ret	10	21	12	14	7	8	11	7	8	19	Ret	35	Ret							93
17	(Germany) Cato Nickel	KTM	21	25	17	10	8	14	13	13					14	Ret					9	8	83
18	(Norway) Håkon Østerhagen	Fantic													18	3	4	6	11	9			78
19	(Netherlands) Jens Walvoort	KTM	15	24	18	23	18	20	12	Ret	18	20	35	12	Ret	17	22	9			10	10	73
20	(Chile) Benjamin Garib	Kawasaki													9	Ret	11	21	6	6	8	Ret	65
21	(Italy) Andrea Rossi	KTM	10	17	14	17	DNS	DNS			27	18	17	11			12	14					59
22	(Spain) Gerard Congost	Gas Gas			15	20	Ret	16	14	24	14	16	13	14	32	20	21	20			14	17	59
23	(Latvia) Edvards Bidzāns	Husqvarna			16	21					6	7	12	13	Ret	14							58
24	(Belgium) Wesly Dieudonné	Husqvarna	Ret	DNS							17	19	16	27	15	Ret	14	Ret	12	17	16	21	42
25	(Latvia) Mairis Pumpurs	Yamaha									9	11	21	26	27	13					13	20	39
26	(Spain) Edgar Canet	KTM	27	29	DNQ	DNQ							30	18	22	16	28	19	9	13	23	15	36
27	(France) Saad Soulimani	KTM	12	19	9	11	Ret	19															35
28	(Finland) Sampo Rainio	KTM									15	14			16	10							29
29	(Netherlands) Kjeld Stuurman	KTM	18	20													9	13					24
30	(Netherlands) Bradley Mesters	Yamaha	Ret	7																	19	18	19
31	(United Kingdom) Joe Brookes	KTM											25	36	Ret	DNS					12	11	19
32	(Italy) Matteo Luigi Russi	Yamaha	Ret	35	29	22	15	18	20	18	30	26	23	17									17
33	(Sweden) Marcus Gredinger	Husqvarna													17	11							14
34	(Italy) Luca Ruffini	KTM	Ret	Ret											23	Ret	26	34	14	14	25	23	14
35	(Belgium) Nicolas Vennekens	Gas Gas	28	32	DNQ	DNQ	25	27	26	26	31	30	31	35	DNQ	24	30	26	15	15	26	24	12
36	(Denmark) Magnus Smith	Yamaha											15	16									11
37	(France) Bogdan Krajewski	KTM	17	22			16	21			Ret	25	Ret	19									11
38	(Latvia) Roberts Lūsis	Gas Gas	24	16							37	21	26	29			18	18					11
39	(United Kingdom) Kelton Gwyther	KTM	30	33	DNQ	DNQ	26	29							DNQ	DNQ	DNQ	33	16	16	DSQ	29	10
40	(Australia) Ryan Alexanderson	KTM																			17	16	9
41	(United Kingdom) Billy Askew	Kawasaki																			24	13	8
42	(Spain) Antonio Gallego	Husqvarna					Ret	25	17	17													8
43	(United Kingdom) Cole McCullough	KTM															17	17					8
44	(United Kingdom) Ben Mustoe	Gas Gas																			22	14	8
45	(Italy) Pietro Razzini	Kawasaki	22	Ret	23	Ret											20	15					7
46	(Sweden) Max Pålsson	KTM	20	21							28	22	22	20	19	Ret					20	19	7
47	(Sweden) Rasmus Moen	Husqvarna	25	28	26	28					21	24	24	25	21	15	23	22					6
48	(Estonia) Martin Michelis	KTM	26	15							22	23											6
49	(Australia) Liam Owens	Kawasaki					23	23	16	22													5
50	(Denmark) Magnus Gregersen	Honda			31	DNS																	5
50	(Denmark) Magnus Gregersen	Husqvarna													30	27	16	24					5
51	(United Kingdom) Alfie Jones	Husqvarna			25	16																	5
52	(Portugal) Fábio Costa	Gas Gas					17	22	22	21													4
53	(Turkey) Ata Kuzu	Yamaha																	17	23			4
54	(Estonia) Kaarel Tilk	Husqvarna									24	17											4
55	(Estonia) Joosep Parn	Gas Gas			32	30					29	Ret	33	Ret	20	18							4
56	(Turkey) Efe Kemal Hid	Yamaha																	20	18			4
57	(Turkey) Ömer Uçum	KTM																	18	21			3
58	(New Zealand) Rian King	KTM																			18	22	3
59	(Turkey) Yiğit Ali Selek	Gas Gas																	22	19			2
60	(Turkey) Beytullah Gurur	Kawasaki																	19	24			2
61	(Sweden) Axel Nilsson	Honda													26	19							2
62	(Portugal) Afonso Gomes	Yamaha					19	26															2
63	(France) Toni Giorgessi	Gas Gas							29	19													2
64	(Germany) Marnique Appelt	KTM											20	21									1
65	(France) Paolo Maschio	Kawasaki			35	33	22	24	24	20													1
66	(Turkey) Mehmet Emin Musaoglu	KTM																	24	20			1
	(Turkey) Mehmet Yiğit Kara	KTM																	21	22			0
	(Latvia) Uldis Freibergs	Husqvarna													28	21							0
	(Spain) Unai Aguiló	Kawasaki							21	Ret													0
	(Slovenia) Jaka Peklaj	Husqvarna																			21	Ret	0
	(Germany) Valentin Kees	KTM			22	25																	0
	(Italy) Morgan Bennati	Kawasaki							23	23			29	34			27	29					0
	(Spain) Francisco García	Gas Gas	23	23																			0
	(Finland) Miro Varjonen	Husqvarna									23	28			29	26							0
	(Denmark) Victor Kleemann	Gas Gas											27	23			Ret	DNS					0
	(Brazil) Rodolfo Bicalho	KTM											32	28	31	23							0
	(Germany) Fynn-Niklas Tornau	Husqvarna			34	29							34	31			24	25					0
	(United Kingdom) Ollie Colmer	KTM	29	26	24	Ret							Ret	Ret									0
	(Netherlands) Scott Smulders	Honda			28	24																	0
	(Portugal) Pedro Rino	KTM					24	31															0
	(Italy) Alessandro Sadovschi	KTM							25	25			DNQ	DNQ									0
	(Netherlands) Sven Dijk	KTM															25	28					0
	(Netherlands) Lotte van Drunen	Kawasaki																			28	25	0
	(Latvia) Martins Platkēvičs	KTM									25	29											0
	(Norway) Elias Auclair	Yamaha													25	Ret							0
	(Finland) Eliel Lehtinen	KTM									26	27	36	32									0
	(Germany) Paul Bloy	KTM			Ret	26							28	33									0
	(United Kingdom) McKenzie Marshall	KTM																			29	26	0
	(Spain) Lucas Bodega	Gas Gas							28	27													0
	(United Kingdom) James Barker	KTM			33	Ret											29	27					0
	(Italy) Giovanni Meneghello	Gas Gas			30	27																	0
	(Latvia) Kristofers Kauliņš	KTM																			30	27	0
	(Belgium) Hugo Buchelot	KTM											DNQ	DNQ			32	31			27	Ret	0
	(Hungary) Bence Pergel	KTM	Ret	27	DNS	Ret																	0
	(Spain) Eric Tomás	Yamaha					27	Ret															0
	(Spain) Unai Larrañaga	Husqvarna							27	Ret													0
	(South Africa) Calum Marriott	Husqvarna							30	28													0
	(Iceland) Eiður Orri Pálmarsson	Yamaha																			31	28	0
	(Portugal) Afonso Simoẽs	Husqvarna					28	32															0
	(Sweden) Liam Åkerlund	Yamaha													33	28							0
	(France) Noah Vampa	Yamaha			DNQ	DNQ	Ret	28															0
	(Italy) Tommaso Lodi	Kawasaki			DNQ	DNQ			31	29			DNQ	DNQ									0
	(Norway) Mathias Kjørstad	Yamaha													Ret	29	DNQ	DNQ					0
	(Germany) Julian Duvier	KTM											DNQ	DNQ	DNQ	DNQ	31	30					0
	(Portugal) Francisco Salgueiro	Yamaha					Ret	30															0
	(Germany) Eric Rakow	Husqvarna											Ret	30									0
	(Sweden) Nike Korsbeck	Husqvarna													Ret	30							0
	(Italy) Eugenio Barbaglia	KTM	31	31																			0
	(Latvia) Rauls Blūmfelds	KTM	32	34							33	31											0
	(Italy) Giuseppe Zangari	KTM			Ret	31																	0
	(Estonia) Mikk Martin Lõhmus	Honda									32	32											0
	(Netherlands) Ryan de Beer	Husqvarna															34	32			DNS	DNS	0
	(Germany) Justin Trache	Yamaha			Ret	32																	0
	(Italy) Davide Della Valle	Husqvarna			37	34							DNQ	DNQ			33	35					0
	(Finland) Joona Kukkonen	KTM									38	33											0
	(Norway) Martin Bredesen	Yamaha									34	34											0
	(Sweden) Filip Hagdahl	KTM											DNS	DNS	34	Ret							0
	(Italy) Riccardo Bindi	Yamaha			36	35					35	35	37	37									0
	(Belgium) Junior Bal	Husqvarna															35	Ret					0
	(Netherlands) Jelle Bankers	KTM	Ret	Ret													Ret	Ret					0
	(Argentina) Ignacio Liprandi	Husqvarna					Ret	DNS															0
	(Belgium) Pako Destercq	Fantic							Ret	DNS													0
	(Italy) Pablo Caspani	Husqvarna			DNQ	DNQ																	0
	(Denmark) Lucas Søndergaard	Gas Gas													DNQ	DNQ							0
	(Norway) Odin Ramseng Haseth	KTM													DNQ	DNQ							0
Pos	Rider	Bike	SAR (Sardinia)		TRE		POR (Portugal)		ESP (Spain)		LAT (Latvia)		GER (Germany)		SWE (Sweden)		NED (Netherlands)		TUR (Turkey)		GBR (United Kingdom)		Points

=== Manufacturers Championship ===
Pos	Bike	SAR (Sardinia)		TRE		POR (Portugal)		ESP (Spain)		LAT (Latvia)		GER (Germany)		SWE (Sweden)		NED (Netherlands)		TUR (Turkey)		GBR (United Kingdom)		Points
1	Yamaha	1	1	1	2	1	3	1	3	1	2	2	3	2	2	2	2	4	1	3	4	445
2	KTM	6	6	2	1	2	1	2	7	5	3	1	1	5	5	1	4	2	4	1	1	411
3	Husqvarna	5	2	6	3	3	2	5	2	3	1	6	2	4	6	5	3	5	2	4	5	376
4	Fantic	2	5	7	6	6	8	3	1	10	Ret	10	5	1	1	4	1	1	5	2	9	346
5	Kawasaki	3	3	19	18	4	5	16	5	8	10	5	8	3	8	3	7	6	3	8	6	283
6	Gas Gas	14	11	11	15	5	15	11	12	13	15	13	10	8	18	15	12	13	10	11	12	176
7	TM	Ret	10	21	12	14	7	8	11	7	8	19	Ret	35	Ret							93
8	Honda			28	24					32	32			26	19							2
Pos	Bike	SAR (Sardinia)		TRE		POR (Portugal)		ESP (Spain)		LAT (Latvia)		GER (Germany)		SWE (Sweden)		NED (Netherlands)		TUR (Turkey)		GBR (United Kingdom)		Points

== EMX125 ==
A 10-round calendar for the 2023 season was announced on 10 November 2022. EMX125 was for riders competing on 2-stroke motorcycles of 125cc.

=== Calendar ===
Round	Date	Grand Prix	Location	Race 1 Winner	Race 2 Winner	Round Winner	Report
1	10 April	Switzerland	Frauenfeld	(Latvia) Jānis Reišulis	(France) Mathis Valin	(France) Mathis Valin	
2	16 April	Trentino	Pietramurata	(Latvia) Jānis Reišulis	(Latvia) Jānis Reišulis	(Latvia) Jānis Reišulis	
3	30 April	Portugal	Águeda	(Latvia) Jānis Reišulis	(France) Mathis Valin	(Latvia) Jānis Reišulis	
4	21 May	France	Villars-sous-Écot	(France) Mathis Valin	(Latvia) Jānis Reišulis	(France) Mathis Valin	
5	4 June	Latvia	Ķegums	(Latvia) Jānis Reišulis	(France) Mathis Valin	(France) Mathis Valin	
6	11 June	Germany	Teutschenthal	(France) Mathis Valin	(Latvia) Jānis Reišulis	(Latvia) Jānis Reišulis	
7	23 July	Flanders	Lommel	(Latvia) Jānis Reišulis	(Finland) Kasimir Hindersson	(Latvia) Jānis Reišulis	
8	13 August	Sweden	Uddevalla	(Latvia) Jānis Reišulis	(Latvia) Jānis Reišulis	(Latvia) Jānis Reišulis	
9	1 October	Great Britain	Matterley Basin	(Latvia) Jānis Reišulis	(Latvia) Jānis Reišulis	(Latvia) Jānis Reišulis	

=== Entry list ===
Team	Constructor	No	Rider	Rounds
JK Racing Yamaha	Yamaha	2	(Denmark) Nicolai Skovbjerg	All
JK Racing Yamaha	Yamaha	79	(Italy) Nicola Salvini	1–7
KTM Sarholz Racing Team	KTM	3	(Germany) Linus Jung	6–8
MR Wolf DreamTeam	Yamaha	5	(Italy) Brando Rispoli	1–2, 4, 6
MR Wolf DreamTeam	Yamaha	61	(Italy) Mattia Filippini	3–7
MR Wolf DreamTeam	Yamaha	228	(Italy) Michael Conte	7, 9
MR Wolf DreamTeam	Yamaha	270	(Israel) Ofir Casey Tzemach	1–5
MR Wolf DreamTeam	Yamaha	732	(Estonia) Tristen Mardo	1–7
Fantic Factory Team Maddii	Fantic	6	(Spain) Elias Escandell	All
Fantic Factory Team Maddii	Fantic	7	(Italy) Niccolò Mannini	1–4, 6
Fantic Factory Team Maddii	Fantic	494	(Germany) Maximilian Werner	1–5, 7–9
	Husqvarna	8	(Bulgaria) Vencislav Toshev	6
	Gas Gas	10	(France) Amaury Maindru	3–6
	Yamaha	12	(Italy) Riccardo Perrone	2, 4, 6
Matt Gardiner MX KTM Race Team	KTM	14	(United Kingdom) Freddie Gardiner	9
Wozniak MX Racing Team	Yamaha	15	(Denmark) Frederik Rahn Stampe	6, 8
DVS Junior Racing	KTM	17	(Indonesia) Angga Lubis	1–3
DVS Junior Racing	KTM	22	(Indonesia) Akbar Lubis	1–3
DVS Junior Racing	KTM	517	(Argentina) Juan Felipe García	7
Oragno114 Husqvarna Racing	Husqvarna	18	(Italy) Alessandro Gaspari	1–3
Sturm STC Racing	Gas Gas	19	(Latvia) Raivo Laicāns	5
Sturm STC Racing	KTM	515	(Denmark) Mads Fredsøe	All
Insubria Team Motocross	Yamaha	21	(Italy) Nathan Mariani	1–4, 6
Insubria Team Motocross	Yamaha	329	(Italy) Maurizio Scollo	1–4
Jezyk Racing Team	KTM	24	(Spain) Carlos Salvador	All
Jezyk Racing Team	KTM	238	(France) Tom Brunet	7–9
KTM Scandinavia	KTM	25	(Norway) Marius Nordbø	1–2, 5
KTM Scandinavia	KTM	961	(Sweden) August Frisk	1–6
Mequitec Gas Gas Racing Team	Gas Gas	29	(Spain) Francisco García	1–8
ICEONE Racing	Husqvarna	30	(Finland) Tiitus Räikkönen	1–2, 5
F4E Gas Gas Racing Team	Gas Gas	32	(United States) Myles Monty	4
F4E Gas Gas Racing Team	Gas Gas	51	(Belgium) Harry Seel	All
F4E Gas Gas Racing Team	Gas Gas	474	(Belgium) Ian Ampoorter	1–6, 9
F4E Gas Gas Racing Team	Gas Gas	919	(Austria) Maximilian Ernecker	1–7, 9
Motocross Center	Gas Gas	37	(Spain) Bruno Miró	7
Motoshop Zachmann	KTM	47	(Switzerland) Bryan Schmucki	1
Motoshop Zachmann	KTM	535	(Portugal) Santiago Espada	1
Team Yamaha New Bike	Yamaha	55	(France) Mathis Barthez	1–2, 4
BRS Racing Team	Fantic	64	(Sweden) Edvin Olstrand	8
	KTM	66	(France) Yannis Lopez	1–2, 4
	KTM	71	(Finland) Arttu Sahlstén	5, 7
Boutaca Racing Team	KTM	78	(Portugal) Gonçalo Cardoso	3
	Gas Gas	80	(Hungary) Peter Varga	7
MJR Racing Team	Gas Gas	83	(Spain) Enzo Badenas	1–3
MJR Racing Team	Gas Gas	501	(Spain) Borja Caballero	3–4
Ljunggrens Motor	KTM	84	(Sweden) Sebastian Sundman	4, 8
	Yamaha	88	(Netherlands) Eric van Helvoirt	7
Dirtbike Racing Team	KTM	94	(Italy) Patrick Busatto	1–2
Dirtbike Racing Team	Husqvarna	549	(Croatia) Šimun Ivandić	1–2, 6
Yamaha Motor Bulgaria	Yamaha	96	(Bulgaria) Dani Tsankov	2
Carpavi Racing Team	Yamaha	97	(Italy) Simone Mancini	All
Hastenberg Racing	Yamaha	100	(Netherlands) Scott Verhoeven	7
MTA MX Racing	KTM	102	(Italy) Filippo Mantovani	1–2, 4, 9
BvZ Racing Team	KTM	103	(Germany) Martin Kettlitz	7–9
SJP Moto	KTM	104	(United Kingdom) Reece Jones	2, 4
	Gas Gas	109	(France) Tom Caneele	4, 6–7
KTL Racing	KTM	110	(Estonia) Richard Paat	All
Stirlings Racing Team	KTM	111	(Netherlands) Damian Knuiman	1, 6–7
BlomsMX Racing Team	Husqvarna	117	(Sweden) Otto Gustavsson	6, 8
GripMesser Racing Team	KTM	121	(Germany) Anthony Caspari	5–9
GripMesser Racing Team	Gas Gas	427	(Netherlands) Mick Kennedy	1–2, 4, 6–7
	KTM	122	(France) Nicolas Leblanc	9
Husqvarna Motorcycles Slovenia	Husqvarna	123	(Slovenia) Jaka Peklaj	1–2, 4–6
Husqvarna Motorcycles Slovenia	Husqvarna	522	(Slovenia) Miha Vrh	1–2, 4
Gas Gas Farioli	Gas Gas	125	(Italy) Mattia Barbieri	1–2
Team JMS Junior Motor Sport	Yamaha	128	(Italy) Vincenzo Bove	1–2, 4
	KTM	141	(Italy) Francesco Bellei	1–2, 4, 6
Kenneth Gundersen MX Team	Husqvarna	147	(Norway) Theodor Imenes	7–9
Husqvarna Scandinavia	Husqvarna	162	(Sweden) Filip Larsson	8
Husqvarna Scandinavia	Husqvarna	471	(Norway) Pelle Gundersen	7–9
Varosa Team	KTM	155	(Spain) Daniel Rodríguez	All
	Gas Gas	157	(Finland) Rene Nyman	5
	KTM	175	(France) Guillaume Haudebault	3–4
	Fantic	177	(Greece) Eleftherios Papadakis	2
De Baets Yamaha MX Team	Yamaha	184	(Belgium) Yirre Saenen	7
Polned KTM	KTM	188	(Netherlands) Rizan Hartman	1–2, 4, 7
Yamaha Racing Center	Yamaha	191	(Norway) Oliver Martinsen	6, 8
Schmicker Racing Team	KTM	194	(Germany) Jonathan Frank	1–3, 6–8
Team AG Motorsport	Fantic	197	(France) Hugo Vauthier	1, 4
Team ATV Racing	Yamaha	199	(Sweden) Neo Svensson	8
JB Racing Team	TM	208	(France) Axel Billottet	1–2, 4
KTM Team Switzerland	KTM	212	(Switzerland) Leon Laimbacher	1–2, 4, 6
KTM Team Switzerland	KTM	250	(Switzerland) Kjetil Oswald	1
Yamaha Racing Center	Yamaha	215	(Norway) Brede Gultvedt	8
JT911	KTM	225	(France) Nicolas Clément	4, 7–8
MX-TRAINING.COM	Yamaha	232	(Norway) Leander Thunshelle	1–2, 6, 8
CSR Racing Team	Yamaha	235	(Italy) Bernardo Dionisi	6
Team Seven Motorsport	KTM	240	(Chile) César Paine Díaz	1–2
Team Seven Motorsport	KTM	412	(Italy) Alfio Pulvirenti	1–3, 7
TSantos Racing	Gas Gas	247	(Portugal) Tomás Santos	3
	KTM	251	(Switzerland) Elliot Hearnden	1
	Yamaha	259	(France) Félix Cardineau	2–4, 7–9
Quaglio Racing	KTM	269	(Italy) Pietro Dal Fitto	2
Mandrite Racing	Yamaha	284	(Italy) Giorgio Orlando	1–2
Gas Gas Scandinavia	Gas Gas	285	(Norway) Patrick Valbjørn	1, 5, 8
Team Beddini Racing KTM	KTM	295	(France) Mano Fauré	All
Team Yamaha Europe MJC	Yamaha	300	(Spain) Salvador Pérez	1–4, 6, 8
Team Yamaha Europe MJC	Yamaha	451	(Czech Republic) Julius Mikula	4–9
Team Yamaha Europe MJC	Yamaha	772	(Latvia) Jānis Reišulis	All
	Gas Gas	303	(Portugal) Flavio Soares	1
Yamaha Racing Hellas	Yamaha	307	(Greece) Sotiris Fotakis	2
	Gas Gas	309	(Finland) Santeri Oinonen	5, 8
Yamaha Speedcity BRC Oficina	Yamaha	311	(Portugal) Sandro Lobo	2–3
Vogelsang Powersports	Yamaha	312	(Switzerland) Noe Zumstein	1, 4, 6
737 Performance Gas Gas Oxmoto	Gas Gas	317	(France) Mathis Valin	All
	KTM	321	(Italy) Alessandro Traversini	1–2, 5, 7–8
MRT Husqvarna San Marino	Husqvarna	336	(Italy) Lorenzo Aglietti	1–2, 4, 6
Tecton Moto Perfections	Gas Gas	337	(Switzerland) Noryn Polsini	4
Yamaha Motor Slovenia	Yamaha	342	(Slovenia) Žan Oven	1–2, 4
All1 Dakar	Yamaha	351	(Spain) Carlos Prat	3–4, 6, 9
SixtySeven Racing Team	Husqvarna	361	(Switzerland) Lenny Geisseler	1, 6
RFME MX Junior Team	Gas Gas	362	(Spain) Marco Alonso	1–6, 8–9
RFME MX Junior Team	Gas Gas	382	(Spain) Manuel López	1, 7–9
MX-Handel Racing	Husqvarna	363	(Liechtenstein) Lyonel Reichl	1–4, 6–7
MX-Handel Racing	Husqvarna	744	(Estonia) Sebastian Leok	1–2, 4–7
MC Sport Racing Team	Gas Gas	388	(Sweden) Elliot Wigforss	8
Team TMX Competition	Yamaha	389	(France) Jules Pietre	1–2, 4
Hofstede MX Team	Husqvarna	400	(Netherlands) Roan Tolsma	1, 4, 6–7
	KTM	404	(Finland) Matias Miettinen	5
DVS Gas Gas	Gas Gas	407	(United Kingdom) Jake Davies	1–2
Van de Laar Racing	Yamaha	417	(Netherlands) Jayson van Drunen	1
Strawberryhill Racing	Husqvarna	418	(Finland) Saku Mansikkamäki	1, 7
Toppform	Yamaha	426	(Norway) Ole Flakstad	8
	Husqvarna	428	(Republic of Ireland) Micheàl McCullagh	9
	Fantic	429	(Belgium) Emerick Pansaerts	7
MB Motocrossteam	KTM	431	(Norway) Markus Sommerstad	1, 7–8
Grizzly Racing Service	Husqvarna	436	(Belgium) Tias Callens	8
Grizzly Racing Service	KTM	505	(Israel) Ben Almagor	2, 6–7, 9
MC Mikkola	Yamaha	438	(Belgium) Brent Van de Walle	1–2, 4, 6–7
	KTM	452	(Italy) Alex Gruber	1–2, 4
	KTM	454	(Finland) Jan Jasper Koiv	1–2, 5, 8
	KTM	457	(Germany) Paul Neunzling	8
RX Moto Husqvarna	Husqvarna	461	(Finland) Eero Peippo	1–2, 5, 7
MotoClub Cremona	KTM	466	(Czech Republic) Václav Janout	1–2, 4, 6–7
SJP Moto	KTM	470	(United Kingdom) Josh Vail	9
Motor2000 KTM Racing Team	KTM	472	(United Kingdom) Max Harris	2–3, 5, 7–9
	Yamaha	478	(Norway) Adrian Bølviken	1–2, 6, 8
Cermen KTM Racing Team	KTM	479	(Czech Republic) Vítězslav Marek	All
MGR Team	KTM	480	(Finland) Kasimir Hindersson	1–2, 5, 7–9
3MX Team	Gas Gas	500	(Italy) Francesco Zoriaco	1–2
MX Stroma Gas Gas Racing Team	Gas Gas	512	(Belgium) Uwe De Waele	4, 6
	Husqvarna	518	(Belgium) Douwe Van Mechgelen	1–8
	Yamaha	524	(Belgium) Emile De Baere	1–2, 4, 6–7, 9
Tech32 Racing MX	KTM	529	(Belgium) Maxime Lucas	2–4, 6–8
Drag'On Tek	Fantic	530	(France) Simon de Ruyter	4, 6, 9
Fastlane Racing Team	Yamaha	537	(Denmark) Emil Gordon Rohmann	6–8
JG Sport Toruń	KTM	539	(Poland) Seweryn Gazda	1–2
Husqvarna Motorcycles Scandinavia	Husqvarna	543	(Sweden) Laban Alm	1–4
New2 Project	KTM	547	(Czech Republic) Martin Závrský	6
	KTM	555	(United Kingdom) Cole McCullough	1–2, 5–9
Grizzly Junior Racing	KTM	567	(Netherlands) Levi Schrik	1–2, 7
WZ Racing Team	KTM	574	(Netherlands) Gyan Doensen	All
TYK Racing bLU cRU Yamaha Deutschland	Yamaha	576	(Germany) Joel Franz	6
	Gas Gas	587	(Italy) Brando Polato	8
KEMCO Management	Yamaha	589	(Belgium) Tyla Van de Poel	4, 6–7
KTM Kosak Team	KTM	592	(Sweden) Freddie Bartlett	1–2, 4–9
MX Moduls	KTM	611	(Latvia) Markuss Kokins	5
MX Moduls	Gas Gas	714	(Latvia) Markuss Ozoliņš	5–6, 8
T.A.L.K. Templant Racing Team	Gas Gas	616	(United Kingdom) Ollie Colmer	7, 9
MX Team Achterhoek	Fantic	621	(Netherlands) Klaas-Jan Kruisselbrink	1–2, 4, 6–7
Becker Racing	Gas Gas	633	(Denmark) Jakob Frandsen	1–2, 7–8
Husqvarna Motorcycles BeLux	Husqvarna	634	(Belgium) Maeron Peeters	4
LR Hooldus KTM Eesti	KTM	637	(Estonia) Jan-Marten Paju	5
MX Magnum	Gas Gas	641	(Latvia) Tomass Šaicāns	1–2, 5–6
Bloody Harry Energy RGS MX Team	Gas Gas	655	(Estonia) Romeo Pikand	1–2, 4–5
KMP Honda Racing powered by Krettek	Husqvarna	701	(Lithuania) Marius Adomaitis	5
	Gas Gas	708	(France) Kivers Lefebvre	4
	Yamaha	710	(Switzerland) Tristan Blanc	1
Jim Aim Racing	Husqvarna	712	(United Kingdom) William Murphy	9
Pardi Racing KTM Motocross	KTM	716	(Hungary) Noel Zanócz	All
	Gas Gas	761	(Poland) Maciej Chlewiński	5, 7
	KTM	767	(Lithuania) Matas Strasevičius	5
Reinsalu Auto KTM Eesti	KTM	784	(Estonia) Kaspar Uibu	5, 8
AMX Racing	KTM	799	(Latvia) Ralfs Spila	5
CEC Racing	KTM	884	(Sweden) Casper Lindmark	7–9
	Gas Gas	911	(Italy) Gennaro Utech	1–2, 4, 6
Power by JJ Racing Team	KTM	920	(Sweden) Sandro Sols	7–8
Team CLT Racing	Yamaha	934	(France) Aaron Husson	4
BVZ Racing Team	Gas Gas	939	(Denmark) Emil Lodal	7–8

=== Riders Championship ===
Pos	Rider	Bike	SUI (Switzerland)		TRE		POR (Portugal)		FRA (France)		LAT (Latvia)		GER (Germany)		FLA (Flanders)		SWE (Sweden)		GBR (United Kingdom)		Points
1	(Latvia) Jānis Reišulis	Yamaha	1	11	1	1	1	2	6	1	1	2	2	1	1	2	1	1	1	1	413
2	(France) Mathis Valin	Gas Gas	2	1	18	5	3	1	1	2	2	1	1	6	2	6	2	2	16	2	353
3	(Germany) Maximilian Werner	Fantic	7	13	2	4	8	3	3	3	4	3	DNS	10	3	5	3	10	3	6	286
4	(Czech Republic) Vítězslav Marek	KTM	4	3	6	8	12	7	2	5	6	4	8	14	4	11	7	7	Ret	4	254
5	(Spain) Elias Escandell	Fantic	5	4	5	2	2	13	13	4	3	7	7	18	6	Ret	8	16	2	11	244
6	(Spain) Francisco García	Gas Gas	9	7	7	11	6	4	5	8	11	5	10	2	Ret	3	13	3			219
7	(Denmark) Mads Fredsøe	KTM	10	15	8	9	Ret	5	4	6	8	10	4	4	20	7	Ret	11	6	7	205
8	(Hungary) Noel Zanócz	KTM	22	6	14	10	7	10	15	14	10	8	12	8	9	9	6	Ret	7	10	181
9	(Netherlands) Gyan Doensen	KTM	19	2	4	7	13	14	17	19	13	13	5	21	13	8	4	13	9	13	176
10	(Denmark) Nicolai Skovbjerg	Yamaha	11	12	24	18	17	15	26	20	16	14	16	3	8	4	9	6	12	12	146
11	(Italy) Simone Mancini	Yamaha	8	18	13	20	Ret	19	7	7	19	20	3	11	17	21	12	14	5	3	144
12	(Czech Republic) Julius Mikula	Yamaha							8	12	5	9	13	7	Ret	34	10	5	4	9	129
13	(Austria) Maximilian Ernecker	Gas Gas	21	9	3	13	11	20	Ret	25	9	11	15	16	7	Ret			8	5	127
14	(Sweden) August Frisk	KTM	14	16	11	6	DNQ	DNQ	10	9	7	18	6	5							108
15	(Finland) Kasimir Hindersson	KTM	Ret	17	23	14					DNS	DNS			5	1	5	4	15	8	105
16	(Italy) Nicola Salvini	Yamaha	6	5	10	21	10	8	9	15	Ret	19	22	12	11	Ret					105
17	(Spain) Salvador Pérez	Yamaha	12	10	12	24	5	22	12	11			9	9			15	15			100
18	(Sweden) Laban Alm	Husqvarna	3	8	Ret	3	4	6	Ret	DNS											86
19	(United Kingdom) Cole McCullough	KTM	37	Ret	DNS	DNS					12	6	21	26	15	10	Ret	Ret	14	17	52
20	(Spain) Carlos Prat	Yamaha					19	12	11	10			20	22					11	15	49
21	(Italy) Alfio Pulvirenti	KTM	35	23	9	12	23	9							29	15					39
22	(Sweden) Freddie Bartlett	KTM	26	29	DNQ	DNQ			25	23	18	17	24	30	25	20	20	12	13	18	29
23	(Belgium) Douwe Van Mechgelen	Husqvarna	DNQ	DNQ	29	32	24	34	30	30	26	23	17	25	10	12	18	27			27
24	(France) Tom Brunet	KTM													19	19	21	8	19	14	26
25	(Italy) Niccolò Mannini	Fantic	25	37	15	16	18	11	20	37			DNQ	DNQ							25
26	(Belgium) Ian Ampoorter	Gas Gas	DNQ	DNQ	28	25	16	16	31	29	15	12	27	23					Ret	DNS	25
27	(Liechtenstein) Lyonel Reichl	Husqvarna	16	19	35	Ret	22	23	24	22			31	15	16	17					22
28	(Netherlands) Damian Knuiman	KTM	13	21									11	28	18	Ret					21
29	(Italy) Gennaro Utech	Gas Gas	DNQ	DNQ	DNQ	DNQ			14	18			18	13							21
30	(Estonia) Richard Paat	KTM	DNQ	DNQ	32	27	9	25	DNQ	DNQ	22	32	Ret	Ret	Ret	29	14	32	Ret	24	19
31	(France) Amaury Maindru	Gas Gas					34	35	16	17	29	15	Ret	17							19
32	(Latvia) Markuss Ozoliņš	Gas Gas									14	Ret	32	27			11	Ret			17
33	(Slovenia) Jaka Peklaj	Husqvarna	28	30	21	17			Ret	13	20	22	19	19							17
34	(Italy) Alessandro Gaspari	Husqvarna	17	34	17	15	Ret	DNS													14
35	(Belgium) Maxime Lucas	KTM			DNQ	DNQ	37	29	DNQ	DNQ			35	Ret	34	24	22	9			12
36	(Norway) Adrian Bølviken	Yamaha	34	27	25	Ret							14	Ret			16	22			12
37	(Italy) Filippo Mantovani	KTM	31	28	DNQ	DNQ			29	27									10	22	11
38	(United Kingdom) Ollie Colmer	Gas Gas													12	27			Ret	19	11
39	(Spain) Marco Alonso	Gas Gas	24	20	26	31	14	24	22	26	Ret	31	25	Ret			29	28	18	23	11
40	(Italy) Maurizio Scollo	Yamaha	DNQ	DNQ	19	19	20	17	19	Ret											11
41	(France) Mathis Barthez	Yamaha	15	24	20	Ret			18	24											10
42	(Netherlands) Roan Tolsma	Husqvarna	DNQ	DNQ					DNQ	DNQ			28	20	DSQ	13					9
43	(Spain) Carlos Salvador	KTM	DNQ	DNQ	16	36	28	26	DNQ	DNQ	DNQ	DNQ	DNQ	DNQ	DNQ	DNQ	17	24	26	Ret	9
44	(France) Mano Fauré	KTM	27	38	31	30	27	Ret	23	DNS	24	30	23	24	33	28	19	Ret	20	16	8
45	(Spain) Manuel López	Gas Gas	DNQ	DNQ											22	14	24	Ret	21	26	7
46	(France) Jules Pietre	Yamaha	Ret	14	22	29			Ret	33											7
47	(Finland) Saku Mansikkamäki	Husqvarna	29	33											14	Ret					7
48	(Portugal) Sandro Lobo	Yamaha			DNQ	DNQ	15	21													6
49	(Israel) Ofir Casey Tzemach	Yamaha	18	26	DNQ	DNQ	21	18	Ret	31	DNQ	Ret									6
50	(Finland) Arttu Sahlstén	KTM									34	27			24	16					5
51	(Norway) Marius Nordbø	KTM	DNQ	DNQ	DNQ	DNQ					28	16									5
52	(Italy) Francesco Bellei	KTM	DNQ	39	DNQ	DNQ			Ret	16			33	29							5
53	(United Kingdom) Josh Vail	KTM																	17	21	4
54	(Estonia) Sebastian Leok	Husqvarna	DNQ	DNQ	DNQ	DNQ			DNQ	DNQ	17	Ret	26	Ret	23	32					4
55	(Finland) Santeri Oinonen	Gas Gas									32	Ret					29	17			4
56	(Denmark) Jakob Frandsen	Gas Gas	DNQ	DNQ	Ret	37									27	18	31	20			4
57	(Norway) Oliver Martinsen	Yamaha											DNQ	DNQ			34	18			3
58	(Sweden) Sandro Sols	KTM													Ret	35	Ret	19			2
59	(Israel) Ben Almagor	KTM			DNQ	DNQ							30	31	DNQ	DNQ			24	20	1
60	(Italy) Patrick Busatto	KTM	20	32	Ret	28															1
	(Latvia) Markuss Kokins	KTM									21	21									0
	(United Kingdom) Reece Jones	KTM			27	22			27	21											0
	(Netherlands) Mick Kennedy	Gas Gas	DNQ	DNQ	DNQ	DNQ			DNQ	DNQ			DNQ	DNQ	21	23					0
	(Belgium) Harry Seel	Gas Gas	DNQ	DNQ	DNQ	DNQ	36	36	DNQ	DNQ	DNQ	DNQ	DNQ	DNQ	DNQ	DNQ	32	21	29	30	0
	(France) Yannis Lopez	KTM	DNQ	DNQ	DNQ	DNQ			21	32											0
	(Latvia) Tomass Šaicāns	Gas Gas	23	22	Ret	23					27	24	34	33							0
	(Norway) Pelle Gundersen	Husqvarna													35	31	26	23	22	25	0
	(Netherlands) Levi Schrik	Gas Gas	DNQ	DNQ	DNQ	DNQ									26	22					0
	(Estonia) Romeo Pikand	Gas Gas	DNQ	DNQ	30	26			Ret	34	23	Ret									0
	(France) Félix Cardineau	Yamaha			DNQ	DNQ	32	39	DNQ	DNQ					DNQ	DNQ	DNQ	31	23	29	0
	(Germany) Linus Jung	Husqvarna											DNQ	DNQ	DNQ	DNQ	23	Ret			0
	(Spain) Daniel Rodríguez	KTM	33	35	DNQ	DNQ	26	30	DNQ	DNQ	37	29	DNQ	DNQ	DNQ	DNQ	27	26	25	27	0
	(Finland) Eero Peippo	Husqvarna	DNQ	DNQ	DNQ	DNQ					25	26			31	30					0
	(Sweden) Casper Lindmark	Husqvarna													DNQ	DNQ	25	Ret	DNS	28	0
	(Italy) Mattia Barbieri	Gas Gas	30	25	DNQ	DNQ															0
	(Norway) Markus Sommerstad	KTM	DNQ	DNQ											30	25	DNQ	DNQ			0
	(Spain) Enzo Badenas	Gas Gas	DNQ	DNQ	DNQ	DNQ	25	33													0
	(Finland) Matias Miettinen	KTM									33	25									0
	(Germany) Paul Neunzling	KTM															35	25			0
	(Belgium) Yirre Saenen	Yamaha													28	26					0
	(Germany) Jonathan Frank	KTM	DNQ	DNQ	DNQ	DNQ	33	27					Ret	Ret	DNQ	DNQ	Ret	29			0
	(Belgium) Emile De Baere	Yamaha	DNQ	DNQ	DNQ	DNQ			DNQ	DNQ			DNQ	DNQ	DNQ	DNQ			27	Ret	0
	(Italy) Brando Rispoli	Yamaha	Ret	DNS	DNQ	DNQ			28	28			29	DNS							0
	(Latvia) Raivo Laicāns	Gas Gas									30	28									0
	(Italy) Nathan Mariani	Yamaha	DNQ	DNQ	DNQ	DNQ	31	28	DNQ	DNQ			DNQ	DNQ							0
	(United Kingdom) Max Harris	KTM			DNQ	DNQ	DNQ	DNQ			DNQ	DNQ			DNQ	DNQ	DNQ	DNQ	28	Ret	0
	(Estonia) Tristen Mardo	Yamaha	DNQ	DNQ	DNQ	DNQ	29	31	DNQ	DNQ	DNQ	DNQ	DNQ	DNQ	DNQ	DNQ					0
	(Spain) Borja Caballero	Gas Gas					30	32	DNQ	DNQ											0
	(Finland) Jan Jasper Koiv	KTM	DNQ	DNQ	DNQ	DNQ					Ret	DNS					33	30			0
	(Italy) Michael Conte	Yamaha													DNQ	DNQ			30	33	0
	(Sweden) Elliot Wigforss	Gas Gas															30	33			0
	(France) Axel Billottet	TM	32	31	DNQ	DNQ			DNQ	DNQ											0
	(France) Simon de Ruyter	Fantic							DNQ	DNQ			DNQ	DNQ					32	31	0
	(Norway) Patrick Valbjorn	Gas Gas	DNQ	DNQ							31	33					Ret	DNS			0
	(Germany) Anthony Caspari	KTM									DNQ	DNQ	DNQ	DNQ	DNQ	DNQ	DNQ	DNQ	31	DNS	0
	(Belgium) Brent Van de Walle	Yamaha	DNQ	DNQ	DNQ	DNQ			DNQ	DNQ			37	DNQ	32	33					0
	(Germany) Martin Kettlitz	KTM													DNQ	DNQ	DNQ	DNQ	33	32	0
	(Sweden) Otto Gustavsson	Husqvarna											36	32			DNQ	DNQ			0
	(Italy) Lorenzo Aglietti	Husqvarna	DNQ	DNQ	DNQ	DNQ			32	38			DNQ	DNQ							0
	(Italy) Giorgio Orlando	Yamaha	DNQ	DNQ	33	34															0
	(Italy) Vincenzo Bove	Yamaha	DNQ	DNQ	Ret	33			DNQ	DNQ											0
	(Slovenia) Žan Oven	Yamaha	DNQ	DNQ	34	35			DNQ	DNQ											0
	(Norway) Theodor Imenes	Husqvarna													DNQ	DNQ	DNQ	DNQ	34	35	0
	(Finland) Tiitus Räikkönen	Husqvarna	DNQ	DNQ	DNQ	DNQ					36	34									0
	(France) Nicolas Leblanc	KTM																	DNQ	34	0
	(France) Guillaume Haudebault	KTM					35	38	DNQ	DNQ											0
	(France) Tom Caneele	Gas Gas							Ret	35			DNQ	DNQ	DNQ	DNQ					0
	(Estonia) Kaspar Uibu	KTM									35	Ret					DNQ	DNQ			0
	(Chile) César Paine Díaz	KTM	36	36	DNQ	DNQ															0
	(Czech Republic) Václav Janout	KTM	DNQ	DNQ	DNQ	DNQ			DNQ	36			DNQ	DNQ	DNQ	DNQ					0
	(Italy) Mattia Filippini	Yamaha					DNQ	37	DNQ	DNQ	DNQ	DNQ	DNQ	DNQ	DNQ	DNQ					0
	(United Kingdom) Freddie Gardiner	KTM																	Ret	DNS	0
	(Portugal) Tomás Santos	Gas Gas					DNS	DNS													0
	(Netherlands) Klaas-Jan Kruisselbrink	Fantic	DNQ	DNQ	DNQ	DNQ			DNQ	DNQ			DNQ	DNQ	DNQ	DNQ					0
	(Italy) Alessandro Traversini	KTM	DNQ	DNQ	DNQ	DNQ					DNQ	DNQ			DNQ	DNQ	DNQ	DNQ			0
	(Switzerland) Leon Laimbacher	KTM	DNQ	DNQ	DNQ	DNQ			DNQ	DNQ			DNQ	DNQ							0
	(Netherlands) Rizan Hartman	KTM	DNQ	DNQ	DNQ	DNQ			DNQ	DNQ					DNQ	DNQ					0
	(Norway) Leander Thunshelle	Yamaha	DNQ	DNQ	DNQ	DNQ							DNQ	DNQ			DNQ	DNQ			0
	(Indonesia) Akbar Lubis	KTM	DNQ	DNQ	DNQ	DNQ	DNQ	DNQ													0
	(Indonesia) Angga Lubis	KTM	DNQ	DNQ	DNQ	DNQ	DNQ	DNQ													0
	(Slovenia) Miha Vrh	Husqvarna	DNQ	DNQ	DNQ	DNQ			DNQ	DNQ											0
	(Italy) Alex Gruber	KTM	DNQ	DNQ	DNQ	DNQ			DNQ	DNQ											0
	(Croatia) Šimun Ivandić	Husqvarna	DNQ	DNQ	DNQ	DNQ							DNQ	DNQ							0
	(Switzerland) Noe Zumstein	Yamaha	DNQ	DNQ					DNQ	DNQ			DNQ	DNQ							0
	(Italy) Riccardo Perrone	Yamaha			DNQ	DNQ			DNQ	DNQ			DNQ	DNQ							0
	(Belgium) Tyla Van de Poel	Yamaha							DNQ	DNQ			DNQ	DNQ	DNQ	DNQ					0
	(France) Nicolas Clément	KTM							DNQ	DNQ					DNQ	DNQ	DNQ	DNQ			0
	(Denmark) Emil Gordon Rohmann	Yamaha											DNQ	DNQ	DNQ	DNQ	DNQ	DNQ			0
	(Italy) Francesco Zoriaco	Gas Gas	DNQ	DNQ	DNQ	DNQ															0
	(United Kingdom) Jake Davies	KTM	DNQ	DNQ	DNQ	DNQ															0
	(Poland) Seweryn Gazda	KTM	DNQ	DNQ	DNQ	DNQ															0
	(France) Hugo Vauthier	Fantic	DNQ	DNQ					DNQ	DNQ											0
	(Switzerland) Lenny Geisseler	Husqvarna	DNQ	DNQ									DNQ	DNQ							0
	(Belgium) Uwe De Waele	Gas Gas							DNQ	DNQ			DNQ	DNQ							0
	(Sweden) Sebastian Sundman	KTM							DNQ	DNQ							DNQ	DNQ			0
	(Poland) Maciej Chlewiński	Gas Gas									DNQ	DNQ			DNQ	DNQ					0
	(Denmark) Frederik Rahn Stampe	Yamaha											DNQ	DNQ			DNQ	DNQ			0
	(Denmark) Emil Lodal	Gas Gas													DNQ	DNQ	DNQ	DNQ			0
	(Portugal) Santiago Espada	KTM	DNQ	DNQ																	0
	(Switzerland) Bryan Schmucki	KTM	DNQ	DNQ																	0
	(Switzerland) Kjetil Oswald	KTM	DNQ	DNQ																	0
	(Portugal) Flavio Soares	Gas Gas	DNQ	DNQ																	0
	(Switzerland) Elliot Hearnden	KTM	DNQ	DNQ																	0
	(Switzerland) Tristan Blanc	Yamaha	DNQ	DNQ																	0
	(Netherlands) Jayson van Drunen	Yamaha	DNQ	DNQ																	0
	(Italy) Pietro Dal Fitto	KTM			DNQ	DNQ															0
	(Bulgaria) Dani Tsankov	Yamaha			DNQ	DNQ															0
	(Greece) Sotiris Fotakis	Yamaha			DNQ	DNQ															0
	(Greece) Eleftherios Papadakis	Fantic			DNQ	DNQ															0
	(Portugal) Gonçalo Cardoso	KTM					DNQ	DNQ													0
	(France) Kivers Lefebvre	Gas Gas							DNQ	DNQ											0
	(France) Aaron Husson	Yamaha							DNQ	DNQ											0
	(Belgium) Maeron Peeters	Husqvarna							DNQ	DNQ											0
	(United States) Myles Monty	Gas Gas							DNQ	DNQ											0
	(Switzerland) Noryn Polsini	Gas Gas							DNQ	DNQ											0
	(Finland) Rene Nyman	Gas Gas									DNQ	DNQ									0
	(Latvia) Ralfs Spila	KTM									DNQ	DNQ									0
	(Lithuania) Matas Strasevičius	KTM									DNQ	DNQ									0
	(Lithuania) Marius Adomaitis	Husqvarna									DNQ	DNQ									0
	(Estonia) Jan-Marten Paju	KTM									DNQ	DNQ									0
	(Czech Republic) Martin Závrský	KTM											DNQ	DNQ							0
	(Bulgaria) Vencislav Toshev	Husqvarna											DNQ	DNQ							0
	(Germany) Joel Franz	Yamaha											DNQ	DNQ							0
	(Italy) Bernardo Dionisi	Yamaha											DNQ	DNQ							0
	(Netherlands) Scott Verhoeven	Yamaha													DNQ	DNQ					0
	(Spain) Bruno Miró	Gas Gas													DNQ	DNQ					0
	(Argentina) Juan Felipe García	KTM													DNQ	DNQ					0
	(Belgium) Emerick Pansaerts	Fantic													DNQ	DNQ					0
	(Hungary) Peter Varga	Gas Gas													DNQ	DNQ					0
	(Netherlands) Eric van Helvoirt	Yamaha													DNQ	DNQ					0
	(Italy) Brando Polato	Gas Gas															DNQ	DNQ			0
	(Sweden) Filip Larsson	Husqvarna															DNQ	DNQ			0
	(Sweden) Edvin Olstrand	Fantic															DNQ	DNQ			0
	(Norway) Brede Gultvedt	Yamaha															DNQ	DNQ			0
	(Belgium) Tias Callens	Husqvarna															DNQ	DNQ			0
	(Sweden) Neo Svensson	Yamaha															DNQ	DNQ			0
	(Norway) Ole Flakstad	Yamaha															DNQ	DNQ			0
	(United Kingdom) William Murphy	Husqvarna																	DNQ	DNQ	0
	(Republic of Ireland) Micheàl McCullagh	Husqvarna																	DNQ	DNQ	0
Pos	Rider	Bike	SUI (Switzerland)		TRE		POR (Portugal)		FRA (France)		LAT (Latvia)		GER (Germany)		FLA (Flanders)		SWE (Sweden)		GBR (United Kingdom)		Points

=== Manufacturers Championship ===
Pos	Bike	SUI (Switzerland)		TRE		POR (Portugal)		FRA (France)		LAT (Latvia)		GER (Germany)		FLA (Flanders)		SWE (Sweden)		GBR (United Kingdom)		Points
1	Yamaha	1	5	1	1	1	2	6	1	1	2	2	1	1	2	1	1	1	1	419
2	Gas Gas	2	1	3	5	3	1	1	2	2	1	1	2	2	3	2	2	8	2	390
3	Fantic	5	4	2	2	2	3	3	3	3	3	7	10	3	5	3	10	2	6	329
4	KTM	4	2	4	6	7	5	2	5	6	4	4	4	4	1	4	4	6	4	322
5	Husqvarna	3	8	17	3	4	6	11	10	17	22	17	15	10	12	18	23	11	15	164
	TM	32	33	DNQ	DNQ			DNQ	DNQ											0
Pos	Bike	SUI (Switzerland)		TRE		POR (Portugal)		FRA (France)		LAT (Latvia)		GER (Germany)		FLA (Flanders)		SWE (Sweden)		GBR (United Kingdom)		Points

== EMXOpen ==
A 1-round calendar for the 2023 season was announced on 10 November 2022. EMXOpen was for riders competing on 2-stroke and 4-stroke motorcycles up to 450cc.

=== Calendar ===
Round	Date	Grand Prix	Location	Race 1 Winner	Race 2 Winner	Round Winner	Report
1	23 July	Flanders	Lommel	(Estonia) Karel Kutsar	(France) Pierre Goupillon	(France) Pierre Goupillon	

=== Entry list ===
Team	Constructor	No	Rider
Millionaire Racing Team ABF Italia	Gas Gas	2	(Lithuania) Arminas Jasikonis
Chambers Racing	Gas Gas	10	(United Kingdom) Harvey Cashmore
Chambers Racing	Gas Gas	16	(United Kingdom) Tom Grimshaw
Bloody Harry Energy - RGS MX Team	Husqvarna	17	(Belgium) Junior Bal
MBP Motocross Team	KTM	18	(Lithuania) Domantas Jazdauskas
EastMX Gas Gas	Gas Gas	21	(Finland) Emil Silander
EastMX Gas Gas	Gas Gas	29	(Finland) Pekka Nissinen
JM Honda Racing	Honda	23	(Belgium) Yentel Martens
Pol Motors	Gas Gas	34	(Netherlands) Micha-Boy de Waal
MotoExtreme Honda	Honda	37	(Estonia) Gert Krestinov
Team RX Moto	KTM	42	(Finland) Sampo Rainio
Osička MX Team	KTM	45	(Slovakia) Tomáš Kohút
Osička MX Team	KTM	53	(Slovakia) Šimon Jošt
Hannamax Motorsport	KTM	46	(Netherlands) Davy Pootjes
Tech32 Racing MX	KTM	57	(France) Pierre Goupillon
De Baets Yamaha MX Team	Yamaha	61	(Belgium) Jaimy Meykens
	Gas Gas	62	(Estonia) Andero Lusbo
MxNyberg	Husqvarna	65	(Finland) Juuso Matikainen
VisuAlz Production	Husqvarna	66	(Germany) Tim Koch
Buitenhuis Racing	Yamaha	77	(Netherlands) Kevin Buitenhuis
JH-MX Service	Gas Gas	94	(Netherlands) Sven van der Mierden
Becker Racing	KTM	101	(Czech Republic) Václav Kovář
Becker Racing	KTM	260	(Germany) Nico Koch
Eastwood Racing Suspension	Honda	103	(United Kingdom) Maximilian Broadbelt
City 2 Roues	Husqvarna	113	(Belgium) Jammy Cornil
Vema Beton	Gas Gas	114	(Belgium) Nicolas Vennekens
Polaris Nordmøre Motocross	Gas Gas	117	(Norway) Cornelius Tøndel
JP Xtreme Xperience	Yamaha	129	(Norway) Sander Agard-Michelsen
Express Racing	KTM	132	(Estonia) Karel Kutsar
Gas Gas TRT Motorcycles	Gas Gas	135	(Spain) Heriberto Cruz
SC Sporthomes Husqvarna	Husqvarna	147	(Finland) Miro Sihvonen
Team VHR Racing	Gas Gas	156	(France) Maxime Sot
Cabscreens Crescent Yamaha	Yamaha	184	(United Kingdom) James Carpenter
Grantham Groundworks Barkshire KTM	KTM	190	(United Kingdom) Luke Benstead
	KTM	198	(Sweden) Jesper Hansson
MS Kluky Motocross Team	Honda	202	(Czech Republic) Jonáš Nedvěd
Honda Vermeeren	Honda	211	(Belgium) Arno Van Mieghem
	Husqvarna	214	(France) Romain Laurent
Enduro Koch Racing	Husqvarna	224	(Czech Republic) Jakub Terešák
KTM Sarholz Racing Team	KTM	238	(Germany) Lukas Platt
FM MaxBart Racing	KTM	249	(Italy) Dario Calugi
Racing Center Antwerpen	Husqvarna	335	(Belgium) Brent Aerden
Lings Offroad	Gas Gas	401	(United Kingdom) Declan Whittle
Joyride MX	KTM	417	(Belgium) Hugo Buchelot
Stielergruppe.mx Johannes-Bikes Suzuki	Suzuki	430	(Denmark) Sam Korneliussen
Stirlings Racing Team	KTM	444	(Netherlands) Jeremy Knuiman
Kaduuz Racing	Fantic	454	(Denmark) Thomas Rasmussen
Betemo	Yamaha	461	(Belgium) Glenn Bielen
Grizzly Racing Service	Gas Gas	469	(Netherlands) Ryan de Beer
	Kawasaki	537	(Netherlands) Damian Wedage
	KTM	726	(Netherlands) Xander Vossebeld
MX-Handel Racing	Husqvarna	733	(Estonia) Kaarel Tilk
	Yamaha	867	(Belgium) Dimitri Van de Sanden

=== Riders Championship ===
Pos	Rider	Motorcycle	FLA (Flanders)		Points
1	(France) Pierre Goupillon	KTM	3	1	45
2	(Finland) Miro Sihvonen	Husqvarna	2	2	44
3	(Sweden) Ken Bengtson	Gas Gas	4	3	38
4	(Netherlands) Sven van der Mierden	Gas Gas	5	4	34
5	(Belgium) Yentel Martens	Honda	7	5	30
6	(Netherlands) Micha-Boy de Waal	Gas Gas	8	7	27
7	(Estonia) Karel Kutsar	KTM	1	Ret	25
8	(Estonia) Gert Krestinov	Honda	6	11	25
9	(Germany) Tim Koch	Husqvarna	13	6	23
10	(Slovakia) Tomáš Kohút	KTM	11	8	23
11	(Czech Republic) Jakub Terešák	Husqvarna	9	12	21
12	(Norway) Cornelius Tøndel	Gas Gas	12	13	17
13	(Germany) Lukas Platt	KTM	10	15	17
14	(Germany) Cato Nickel	KTM	17	9	16
15	(Lithuania) Domantas Jazdauskas	KTM	22	10	11
16	(Finland) Juuso Matikainen	Husqvarna	14	17	11
17	(United Kingdom) James Carpenter	Yamaha	19	14	9
18	(Finland) Emil Silander	Gas Gas	15	24	6
19	(Belgium) Glenn Bielen	Yamaha	26	16	5
20	(Estonia) Andero Lusbo	Gas Gas	16	Ret	5
21	(Slovakia) Šimon Jošt	KTM	30	18	3
22	(United Kingdom) Tom Grimshaw	Gas Gas	18	21	3
23	(Belgium) Junior Bal	Husqvarna	24	19	2
24	(Norway) Sander Agard-Michelsen	Yamaha	Ret	20	1
25	(Estonia) Kaarel Tilk	Husqvarna	20	30	1
	(Germany) Nico Koch	KTM	21	Ret	0
	(Czech Republic) Václav Kovář	KTM	Ret	22	0
	(Belgium) Arno Van Mieghem	Honda	23	25	0
	(Belgium) Brent Aerden	Husqvarna	32	23	0
	(Denmark) Thomas Rasmussen	Fantic	25	Ret	0
	(Finland) Pekka Nissinen	Gas Gas	31	26	0
	(Sweden) Jesper Hansson	KTM	29	27	0
	(France) Maxime Sot	Gas Gas	27	29	0
	(Belgium) Dimitri Van de Sanden	Yamaha	28	28	0
	(United Kingdom) Luke Benstead	KTM	DNS	31	0
	(Netherlands) Ryan de Beer	Gas Gas	Ret	32	0
	(Netherlands) Kevin Buitenhuis	Yamaha	33	34	0
	(Belgium) Nicolas Vennekens	Gas Gas	36	33	0
	(Denmark) Sam Korneliussen	Suzuki	34	35	0
	(Netherlands) Damian Wedage	Kawasaki	35	DNQ	0
	(Netherlands) Davy Pootjes	KTM	Ret	Ret	0
	(Netherlands) Jeremy Knuiman	KTM	DNS	DNS	0
	(Netherlands) Xander Vossebeld	KTM	DNQ	DNQ	0
	(Belgium) Jammy Cornil	Husqvarna	DNQ	DNQ	0
	(Belgium) Hugo Buchelot	KTM	DNQ	DNQ	0
	(United Kingdom) Harvey Cashmore	Gas Gas	DNQ	DNQ	0
	(Belgium) Jaimy Meykens	Yamaha	DNQ	DNQ	0
	(Czech Republic) Jonáš Nedvěd	Honda	DNQ	DNQ	0
Pos	Rider	Motorcycle	FLA (Flanders)		Points

=== Manufacturers Championship ===
Pos	Manufacturer	FLA (Flanders)		Points
1	KTM	1	1	50
2	Husqvarna	2	2	44
3	Gas Gas	4	3	38
4	Honda	6	5	31
5	Yamaha	19	14	9
	Fantic	25	Ret	0
	Suzuki	34	35	0
	Kawasaki	35	DNQ	0
Pos	Manufacturer	FLA (Flanders)		Points

== EMX2T ==
A 1-round calendar for the 2023 season was announced on 10 November 2022. EMX2T was for riders competing on 2-stroke motorcycles of 250cc.

=== Calendar ===
Round	Date	Grand Prix	Location	Race 1 Winner	Race 2 Winner	Round Winner	Report
1	16 July	Czech Republic	Loket	(Netherlands) Cas Valk	(Netherlands) Cas Valk	(Netherlands) Cas Valk	

=== Entry list ===
Team	Constructor	No	Rider
Bloms MX Racing Team	Husqvarna	13	(Sweden) Adam Fridlund
Insubria Team Motocross	Yamaha	21	(Italy) Nathan Mariani
	KTM	22	(Italy) Raffaele Giuzio
DB Project	Husqvarna	36	(Czech Republic) Michal Bárta
Team Castellari	Gas Gas	37	(Italy) Yuri Quarti
Team Castellari	Gas Gas	241	(Italy) Giovanni Meneghello
Hofstede MX Team	Husqvarna	38	(Netherlands) Karl Timmerman
Team RX Moto	KTM	42	(Finland) Sampo Rainio
	Fantic	44	(Czech Republic) Marek Krejcí
	KTM	57	(Lithuania) Neilas Pecatauskas
Team Ando	KTM	60	(United Kingdom) Brad Anderson
Fly Over Competition Gaerne	Kawasaki	71	(Italy) Morgan Bennati
IDS Stavby MX Racing Team	KTM	81	(Czech Republic) Jaroslav Strnad
Benzinbrüder Racing Team	KTM	84	(Austria) Markus Windhaber
	KTM	88	(Netherlands) Juup Tax
Anette Racing Team	KTM	90	(Czech Republic) Jiří Hendrych
Rodeo Racing MX Team	KTM	92	(Latvia) Toms Macuks
Kamikaze Racing Team	TM	95	(Czech Republic) Pavel Doubek
Becker Racing	KTM	101	(Czech Republic) Václav Kovář
	Honda	102	(Italy) Tomas Ragadini
	Honda	110	(Germany) André de Veer
Orion Racing Team	KTM	111	(Czech Republic) Petr Bartoš
	KTM	116	(Italy) Jimmy de Nicola
Polaris Nordmøre Motocross	Gas Gas	117	(Norway) Cornelius Tøndel
MX Team Znojmo	Husqvarna	119	(Czech Republic) Jiří Matějec
	Yamaha	129	(Norway) Sander Agard-Michelsen
MTR Team Racing	Yamaha	146	(Belgium) Mike Roose
Fantic Racing	Fantic	172	(Netherlands) Cas Valk
Fantic Racing	Fantic	717	(France) Alexis Fueri
MX88 Motorsport	Husqvarna	188	(Netherlands) Freek van der Vlist
Zweiradsport Schmitz	Husqvarna	197	(Germany) Thomas Haas
	Husqvarna	200	(Netherlands) René Boer
Team HTS KTM	KTM	214	(Hungary) Bence Pergel
KTM Sklep	KTM	221	(Poland) Wiktor Sobiech
	KTM	226	(Switzerland) Duane Hauser
	KTM	259	(France) Wayne Suire
CRT Racing	Husqvarna	295	(Italy) Andrea Corradin
HSV Ried	KTM	319	(Austria) Christoph Zeintl
MCV Motorsport	KTM	322	(Italy) Filippo Gervasio
Vrignon Construction	Gas Gas	338	(France) David Herbreteau
Sturm STC Racing Team	KTM	347	(Austria) Johannes Klein
Sturm STC Racing Team	KTM	515	(Denmark) Mads Fredsøe
	KTM	365	(Denmark) Nikolaj Skovgaard
Jump Racing Team	Husqvarna	373	(Italy) Alessio Bonetta
Action Racing	KTM	377	(Czech Republic) Martin Krč
Brouwer KTM	KTM	411	(Netherlands) Kjeld Stuurman
Mellendijk Motor Parts	Husqvarna	419	(Netherlands) Jan Spliethof
	KTM	438	(France) Kévin Charpentier
Kaduuz Racing	Fantic	454	(Denmark) Thomas Rasmussen
Cermen KTM Racing Team	KTM	479	(Czech Republic) Vítězslav Marek
	KTM	484	(Italy) Marco Stella
	KTM	517	(Italy) Pablo Caspani
KTM Zauner Racing	KTM	531	(Austria) Florian Hellrigl
	Kawasaki	537	(Netherlands) Damian Wedage
Filten Racing	Yamaha	572	(Denmark) Rasmus Pedersen
	Honda	619	(Belgium) Adrien Chapelle
	KTM	715	(Netherlands) Jaap Janssen
	KTM	726	(Netherlands) Xander Vossebeld
	Beta	726	(Italy) Devid Tozzi
GPX Motocross Team	Husqvarna	838	(Italy) Paolo Ermini
Schepers Racing	KTM	880	(Netherlands) Sven Dijk
KTM Kosak Team	Fantic	881	(Germany) Cedric Schick
	Yamaha	926	(France) Lois Trellyer
	Gas Gas	929	(Poland) Jan Kotowicz
	Yamaha	955	(France) Lilian Henry

=== Riders Championship ===
Pos	Rider	Motorcycle	CZE (Czech Republic)		Points
1	(Netherlands) Cas Valk	Fantic	1	1	50
2	(Norway) Cornelius Tøndel	Gas Gas	2	4	40
3	(Italy) Yuri Quarti	Gas Gas	7	2	36
4	(Austria) Florian Hellrigl	KTM	5	6	31
5	(Finland) Sampo Rainio	KTM	8	5	29
6	(Czech Republic) Vítězslav Marek	KTM	14	3	27
7	(Denmark) Rasmus Pedersen	Yamaha	6	11	25
8	(Sweden) Adam Fridlund	Husqvarna	12	8	22
9	(Netherlands) Freek van der Vlist	Husqvarna	13	9	20
10	(Czech Republic) Jiří Matějec	Husqvarna	10	12	20
11	(Czech Republic) Martin Krč	KTM	9	13	20
12	(Czech Republic) Václav Kovář	KTM	3	Ret	20
13	(Latvia) Toms Macuks	KTM	4	Ret	18
14	(Norway) Sander Agard-Michelsen	Yamaha	DNS	7	14
15	(Italy) Tomas Ragadini	Honda	15	14	13
16	(Netherlands) Kjeld Stuurman	KTM	21	10	11
17	(Czech Republic) Petr Bartoš	KTM	16	15	11
18	(Denmark) Mads Fredsøe	KTM	11	33	10
19	(Italy) Pablo Caspani	KTM	24	16	5
20	(Austria) Johannes Klein	KTM	Ret	17	4
21	(Italy) Morgan Bennati	Kawasaki	17	34	4
22	(Netherlands) Damian Wedage	Kawasaki	31	18	3
23	(Netherlands) René Boer	Husqvarna	18	25	3
24	(Netherlands) Jaap Janssen	KTM	30	19	2
25	(Hungary) Bence Pergel	KTM	19	Ret	2
26	(Germany) Thomas Haas	Husqvarna	32	20	1
27	(Italy) Raffaele Giuzio	KTM	20	30	1
	(Czech Republic) Jiří Hendrych	KTM	25	21	0
	(Italy) Alessio Bonetta	Husqvarna	26	22	0
	(Italy) Paolo Ermini	Husqvarna	22	Ret	0
	(Italy) Jimmy de Nicola	KTM	23	36	0
	(Netherlands) Sven Dijk	KTM	DNQ	23	0
	(Netherlands) Jan Spliethof	Husqvarna	33	24	0
	(Germany) Cedric Schick	Fantic	36	26	0
	(Denmark) Nikolaj Skovgaard	KTM	28	27	0
	(Denmark) Thomas Rasmussen	Fantic	27	28	0
	(Czech Republic) Michal Bárta	Husqvarna	29	29	0
	(Italy) Filippo Gervasio	KTM	35	31	0
	(Netherlands) Karl Timmerman	Husqvarna	34	32	0
	(Netherlands) Xander Vossebeld	KTM	Ret	35	0
	(United Kingdom) Brad Anderson	KTM	Ret	DNS	0
	(Austria) Christoph Zeintl	Gas Gas	DNQ	DNQ	0
	(France) Lilian Henry	Yamaha	DNQ	DNQ	0
	(Switzerland) Duane Hauser	KTM	DNQ	DNQ	0
	(Italy) Devid Tozzi	Beta	DNQ	DNQ	0
	(Czech Republic) Jaroslav Strnad	KTM	DNQ	DNQ	0
	(France) Louis Trelluyer	Yamaha	DNQ	DNQ	0
	(Netherlands) Juup Tax	KTM	DNQ	DNQ	0
	(Czech Republic) Marek Krejcí	Fantic	DNQ	DNQ	0
	(Germany) Andre de Veer	Honda	DNQ	DNQ	0
	(Belgium) Mike Roose	Yamaha	DNQ	DNQ	0
	(Austria) Markus Windhaber	KTM	DNQ	DNQ	0
	(Poland) Jan Kotowicz	Gas Gas	DNQ	DNQ	0
	(Poland) Wiktor Sobiech	KTM	DNQ	DNQ	0
	(France) Wayne Suire	KTM	DNQ	DNQ	0
	(Belgium) Adrien Chapelle	Honda	DNQ	DNQ	0
Pos	Rider	Motorcycle	CZE (Czech Republic)		Points

=== Manufacturers Championship ===
Pos	Manufacturer	CZE (Czech Republic)		Points
1	Fantic	1	1	50
2	Gas Gas	2	2	44
3	KTM	3	3	40
4	Yamaha	6	7	29
5	Husqvarna	10	8	24
6	Honda	15	14	13
7	Kawasaki	17	18	7
	Beta	DNQ	DNQ	0
Pos	Manufacturer	CZE (Czech Republic)		Points

== EMX85 ==
A 1-round calendar for the 2023 season was announced on 10 November 2022. EMX85 was for riders competing on 2-stroke motorcycles of 85cc.

=== Calendar ===
Round	Date	Grand Prix	Location	Race 1 Winner	Race 2 Winner	Round Winner	Report
1	16 July	Czech Republic	Loket	(France) Liam Bruneau	(Italy) Nicolò Alvisi	(Italy) Nicolò Alvisi	

=== Participants ===
Riders qualified for the championship by finishing in the top 10 in one of the 4 regional 85cc championships.

No	Rider	Motorcycle
17	(Hungary) Áron Katona	KTM
202	(Switzerland) Ryan Oppliger	KTM
205	(Spain) Alejandro Torres	KTM
208	(Italy) Nicolò Alvisi	Gas Gas
211	(Italy) Riccardo Pini	KTM
217	(Spain) Juan Izaguirre	KTM
223	(Germany) Emil Ziemer	Husqvarna
246	(Spain) José María Hernández	KTM
252	(Spain) Valentino Vázquez	Husqvarna
275	(Italy) Edoardo Riganti	Husqvarna
281	(Italy) David Cracco	Husqvarna
292	(Austria) Ricardo Bauer	KTM
300	(South Africa) Trent Valsecchi	Gas Gas
301	(France) Liam Bruneau	KTM
312	(Italy) Leonardo Calandra	KTM
326	(France) Kenzo Ferez	Husqvarna
350	(France) Sleny Goyer	KTM
353	(Italy) Andrea Uccellini	Husqvarna
373	(Italy) Luca Colonelli	KTM
374	(Spain) Oleguer Riba	Gas Gas
385	(Spain) Jorge Salvador	KTM
391	(Switzerland) Luis Santeusanio	Yamaha
411	(Netherlands) Dex van den Broek	KTM
412	(Germany) Jacob Bloch	Gas Gas
418	(United Kingdom) Drew Stock	Gas Gas
424	(Netherlands) Dean Gregoire	KTM
428	(Belgium) Tom Dukerts	Gas Gas
429	(Austria) Moritz Ernecker	Gas Gas
442	(Denmark) Oliver Agathon Hald	Husqvarna
464	(Denmark) Bertram Thorius	Yamaha
484	(Netherlands) Dex Kooiker	KTM
499	(Netherlands) Dani Heitink	Husqvarna
503	(Belgium) Jarne Bervoets	KTM
511	(Germany) Mark Tanneberger	Husqvarna
513	(Czech Republic) Stanislav Pojar	KTM
522	(Netherlands) Timo Heuver	KTM
524	(Netherlands) Jaymian Ramakers	Husqvarna
548	(United Kingdom) Hayden Statt	KTM
580	(United Kingdom) Robbie Daly	KTM
584	(Netherlands) Jannes Vos	KTM
611	(Estonia) Lucas Leok	Husqvarna
612	(Estonia) Paul Raid	Gas Gas
625	(Sweden) Benjamin Martensson	Husqvarna
649	(Sweden) Alve Callemo	Husqvarna
722	(Latvia) Jēkabs Hudolejs	Gas Gas
729	(Poland) Michał Psiuk	KTM
740	(Estonia) Travis Leok	Husqvarna
757	(Latvia) Toms Dankerts	KTM

=== Riders Championship ===
Pos	Rider	Motorcycle	CZE (Czech Republic)		Points
1	(Italy) Nicolò Alvisi	Gas Gas	2	1	47
2	(France) Liam Bruneau	KTM	1	2	47
3	(Netherlands) Dex Kooiker	KTM	4	3	38
4	(Italy) Riccardo Pini	KTM	3	7	34
5	(Switzerland) Ryan Oppliger	KTM	8	4	31
6	(Netherlands) Dean Gregoire	KTM	7	5	30
7	(Italy) Edoardo Riganti	Husqvarna	6	8	28
8	(Netherlands) Dani Heitink	Husqvarna	10	9	23
9	(Italy) Andrea Uccellini	Husqvarna	14	6	22
10	(Spain) Oleguer Riba	Gas Gas	12	14	16
11	(Belgium) Jarne Bervoets	KTM	5	DSQ	16
12	(Spain) Juan Izaguirre	KTM	9	19	14
13	(Czech Republic) Stanislav Pojar	KTM	17	13	12
14	(France) Kenzo Ferez	Husqvarna	13	17	12
15	(Sweden) Alve Callemo	Husqvarna	33	10	11
16	(France) Sleny Goyer	KTM	15	16	11
17	(Estonia) Travis Leok	Husqvarna	31	11	10
18	(Poland) Michał Psiuk	KTM	20	12	10
19	(Austria) Moritz Ernecker	Gas Gas	11	Ret	10
20	(Italy) Luca Colonelli	KTM	24	15	6
21	(United Kingdom) Robbie Daly	KTM	16	22	5
22	(Estonia) Lucas Leok	Husqvarna	21	18	3
23	(Austria) Ricardo Bauer	KTM	18	31	3
24	(France) Léo Diss-Fenard	KTM	19	21	2
25	(Denmark) Jacob Bloch	Husqvarna	22	20	1
	(Italy) Leonardo Calandra	KTM	29	23	0
	(United Kingdom) Drew Stock	Gas Gas	23	Ret	0
	(Hungary) Áron Katona	KTM	Ret	24	0
	(Italy) David Cracco	Husqvarna	25	33	0
	(Latvia) Jēkabs Hudolejs	Gas Gas	Ret	25	0
	(Denmark) Storm Maymann	Yamaha	30	26	0
	(Denmark) Oliver Agathon Hald	Husqvarna	26	Ret	0
	(Spain) Alejandro Torres	KTM	27	28	0
	(Netherlands) Jaymian Ramakers	Husqvarna	37	27	0
	(Ukraine) Ostap Andrukh	KTM	28	35	0
	(Denmark) Bertram Thorius	Yamaha	32	29	0
	(Germany) Max Meyer	Yamaha	34	30	0
	(Sweden) Dante Lantz	Husqvarna	36	32	0
	(Germany) Mark Tanneberger	Husqvarna	35	34	0
	(South Africa) Trent Valsecchi	Gas Gas	DNQ	36	0
	(Spain) Valentino Vázquez	Gas Gas	Ret	DNS	0
	(Switzerland) Luis Santeusanio	Yamaha	DNQ	Ret	0
	(Spain) Jorge Salvador	KTM	DNQ	DNQ	0
	(Netherlands) Jannes Vos	KTM	DNQ	DNQ	0
	(Estonia) Paul Raid	Gas Gas	DNQ	DNQ	0
	(Sweden) Benjamin Martensson	Husqvarna	DNQ	DNQ	0
	(United Kingdom) Hayden Statt	KTM	DNQ	DNQ	0
	(Netherlands) Timo Heuver	KTM	DNQ	DNQ	0
	(Spain) José María Hernández	KTM	DNQ	DNQ	0
	(Belgium) Vince van Hoof	KTM	DNQ	DNQ	0
Pos	Rider	Motorcycle	CZE (Czech Republic)		Points

=== Manufacturers Championship ===
Pos	Manufacturer	CZE (Czech Republic)		Points
1	Gas Gas	2	1	47
2	KTM	1	2	47
3	Husqvarna	6	6	30
	Yamaha	30	26	0
Pos	Manufacturer	CZE (Czech Republic)		Points

== EMX65 ==
A 1-round calendar for the 2023 season was announced on 10 November 2022. EMX65 was for riders competing on 2-stroke motorcycles of 65cc.

=== Calendar ===
Round	Date	Grand Prix	Location	Race 1 Winner	Race 2 Winner	Round Winner	Report
1	16 July	Czech Republic	Loket	(Italy) Francesco Assini	(United Kingdom) Harry Dale	(Italy) Francesco Assini	

=== Participants ===
Riders qualified for the championship by finishing in the top 10 in one of the 4 regional 65cc championships.

No	Rider	Motorcycle
9	(Serbia) Ana Kolnookov	KTM
204	(Spain) Mateo Torres	Husqvarna
209	(Slovenia) Taj Golez	Husqvarna
219	(Slovenia) Leo Gajser	Yamaha
221	(Italy) Kevin Cantu	Husqvarna
280	(South Africa) Kabelo Ledwaba	Gas Gas
243	(Croatia) Roko Ivandić	KTM
261	(France) Ryan Lustenberger	Yamaha
263	(Slovenia) Svit Vižintin	KTM
265	(Italy) Francesco Assini	Gas Gas
274	(Spain) Santiago Cordero	KTM
285	(France) Tim Lopes	Gas Gas
298	(Italy) Lucas Croci	Gas Gas
300	(France) Loan Torro	Gas Gas
311	(Switzerland) Tizian Bolliger	KTM
318	(Italy) Giacomo Donde	Gas Gas
326	(Spain) Gonzalo Salvador	KTM
327	(France) Baptiste Jouan	Gas Gas
356	(Italy) Achille Esposito	Husqvarna
358	(France) Eydan Goyer	KTM
366	(Italy) Dominick Maifredi	KTM
372	(Italy) Federico Baldo	KTM
397	(Slovenia) Alex Novak	KTM
404	(Netherlands) Kenzo Jaspers	Husqvarna
408	(Netherlands) Yuel Karnebeek	Gas Gas
410	(Belgium) Zani Vanoirbeek	KTM
418	(Belgium) Torre Van Mechgelen	KTM
422	(Belgium) Noam Mezzavilla	KTM
424	(Netherlands) Dano Verstraten	KTM
438	(Denmark) Sander Egebjerg	Gas Gas
474	(Denmark) Willads Gordon	Yamaha
475	(United Kingdom) Cohen Jagielski	Gas Gas
480	(Netherlands) Teunis Spijkerman	Gas Gas
500	(Netherlands) Kash van Hamond	Gas Gas
520	(Slovakia) Maxim Zimmerman	Husqvarna
525	(Czech Republic) Dominik Hasoň	KTM
528	(Poland) Ksawery Krysztoforski	Husqvarna
567	(United Kingdom) Brian Gyles	KTM
582	(Germany) Jamiro Peters	KTM
598	(United Kingdom) Harry Dale	KTM
614	(Poland) Tymon Tomtała	Husqvarna
622	(Estonia) Rasmus Naar	KTM
683	(Estonia) Robin Robert Mooses	Husqvarna
700	(Estonia) Theo Kolts	Gas Gas
709	(Estonia) Gregor Lootus	KTM
712	(Latvia) Rainers Grasis	Gas Gas
742	(Estonia) Enri Lustus	Husqvarna
751	(Latvia) Martins Cīrulis	Husqvarna
771	(Latvia) Patriks Cīrulis	Husqvarna
779	(Poland) Jakub Celej	Yamaha

=== Riders Championship ===
Pos	Rider	Motorcycle	CZE (Czech Republic)		Points
1	(Italy) Francesco Assini	Gas Gas	1	4	43
2	(France) Tim Lopes	Gas Gas	2	3	42
3	(United Kingdom) Harry Dale	KTM	13	1	33
4	(Netherlands) Kenzo Jaspers	Husqvarna	3	8	33
5	(Latvia) Patriks Cīrulis	Husqvarna	6	6	30
6	(Slovakia) Maxim Zimmerman	Husqvarna	7	10	25
7	(Latvia) Martins Cīrulis	Husqvarna	11	7	24
8	(Germany) Jamiro Peters	KTM	14	5	23
9	(Belgium) Torre Van Mechgelen	KTM	24	2	22
10	(Spain) Santiago Cordero	KTM	9	12	21
11	(Estonia) Enri Lustus	Husqvarna	8	13	21
12	(France) Loan Torro	Gas Gas	5	17	20
13	(United Kingdom) Brian Gyles	KTM	12	11	19
14	(Netherlands) Teunis Spijkerman	Gas Gas	4	36	18
15	(South Africa) Kabelo Ledwaba	Gas Gas	20	9	13
16	(Spain) Gonzalo Salvador	KTM	10	20	12
17	(France) Eydan Goyer	KTM	19	14	9
18	(Slovenia) Alex Novak	KTM	18	15	9
19	(Slovenia) Taj Golez	Husqvarna	16	19	7
20	(Italy) Dominick Malfredi	KTM	15	22	6
21	(Italy) Kevin Cantu	Husqvarna	22	16	5
22	(Latvia) Rainers Grasis	Gas Gas	17	25	4
23	(Italy) Achille Esposito	Husqvarna	27	18	3
	(Estonia) Robin Robert Mooses	Husqvarna	28	21	0
	(Czech Republic) Dominik Hasoň	KTM	21	23	0
	(Estonia) Theo Kolts	Gas Gas	31	24	0
	(United Kingdom) Cohen Jagielski	Gas Gas	23	26	0
	(Switzerland) Tizian Bolliger	KTM	39	27	0
	(Slovenia) Leo Gajser	Yamaha	29	28	0
	(Croatia) Roko Ivandić	KTM	26	29	0
	(Denmark) Willads Gordon	Yamaha	32	30	0
	(Spain) Mateo Torres	Husqvarna	34	31	0
	(Serbia) Ana Kolnookov	KTM	37	32	0
	(Estonia) Rasmus Naar	KTM	36	33	0
	(Poland) Tymon Tomtała	Husqvarna	30	34	0
	(Netherlands) Dano Verstraten	KTM	25	35	0
	(France) Ryan Lustenberger	Yamaha	35	37	0
	(Poland) Jakub Celej	Yamaha	33	38	0
	(Italy) Lucas Croci	Gas Gas	38	39	0
	(Netherlands) Kash van Hamond	Gas Gas	Ret	Ret	0
	(Italy) Federico Baldo	KTM	DNQ	DNQ	0
	(Slovenia) Svit Vižintin	KTM	DNQ	DNQ	0
	(Belgium) Zani Vanoirbeek	KTM	DNQ	DNQ	0
	(Poland) Ksawery Krysztoforski	Husqvarna	DNQ	DNQ	0
	(Netherlands) Yuel Karnebeek	Gas Gas	DNQ	DNQ	0
	(Denmark) Sander Egebjerg	Gas Gas	DNQ	DNQ	0
	(France) Baptiste Jouan	Gas Gas	DNQ	DNQ	0
	(Belgium) Noam Mezzavilla	KTM	DNQ	DNQ	0
	(Italy) Giacomo Donde	Gas Gas	DNQ	DNQ	0
Pos	Rider	Motorcycle	CZE (Czech Republic)		Points

=== Manufacturers Championship ===
Pos	Manufacturer	CZE (Czech Republic)		Points
1	Gas Gas	1	3	45
2	KTM	9	1	37
3	Husqvarna	3	6	35
	Yamaha	29	28	0
Pos	Manufacturer	CZE (Czech Republic)		Points
