= Andrea Bonacorsi =

Italian motocross racer

- Nationality: Italian
- Born: 23 April 2003 (age 23); Bergamo, Italy
- Current team: Ducati Factory Racing MXGP
- Bike number: 132

Andrea Bonacorsi (born April 23, 2003) is an Italian professional Motocross racer. He has competed in the Motocross World Championship since making some wildcard appearances in the 2022 season.

Bonacorsi is a two-time European motocross champion, winning the EMX125 class in 2020 and the EMX250 class in 2023.

Following his EMX250 title, Bonacorsi was signed by the Monster Energy Yamaha Factory MX2 Team to compete in the MX2 class of the 2024 FIM Motocross World Championship full-time. From the fifth round onwards, he was moved up to the MXGP class due to injuries for the other teams riders.

Bonacorsi moved to the factory Fantic team for the 2025 FIM Motocross World Championship, where he finished eighth in the final standings and secured his first overall podium in the class. From the 2026 season, Bonacorsi stayed with the same team, which in turn transitioned to be Ducati's factory MXGP team.

Bonacorsi has been to selected to represent his country at the Motocross des Nations three times, with his most recent selection coming at the 2025 edition. Bonacorsi was part of the Italian team that finished third in the event in 2023.

== Career ==
=== Junior career ===
Bonacorsi finished second in the 65 class of the Italian Junior Motocross Championship in 2014 riding a Bucci. This earned him the opportunity to ride at that season's FIM Motocross Junior World Championship in Belgium, where he scored a point. Moving up to the 85 Junior class for 2015, he again finished as runner-up in the Italian Junior Championship, winning three races and the final round overall.

By 2017, Bonacorsi formed part of the KTM Silver Action team and competed in his first rounds of the European Motocross Championship, scoring three points in EMX125. Staying with the Silver Action team, he raced full time in the EMX125 class of the 2018 European Motocross Championship, finishing fifteenth in the standings and notably finishing third overall at the Lommel round in Belgium. With the Silver Action team closing its doors following the 2018 season, Bonacorsi moved to the Celestini KTM team for the 2019 season. He won the 125 class at the opening round of the pre-season Italian International Motocross Championship in the 125 class and finished as runner-up in the three round series. In the 2019 European Motocross Championship, he finished tenth in the EMX125 standings with his best result coming at Lommel again, this time finishing fourth overall in the sand. In addition, Bonacorsi competed in his second FIM Motocross Junior World Championship, this time in his native Italy - where he finished sixth in the second 125 race.

The COVID-19 impacted 2020 European Motocross Championship saw Bonacorsi switch brands to compete for the Fantic Racing Team. After the season returned from the pandemic-enforced break in September, Bonacorsi took a clean sweep of all races across the three rounds held at the Faenza track. A further overall win at the sixth round in Spain and a second overall at the eighth round at Lommel meant he took the title a few days later at the Belgian track.

=== 250 career ===
Following his success aboard a 125, Bonacorsi was signed by Yamaha's factory team for the EMX250 class of the 2021 European Motocross Championship. He adapted to the class quickly, placing in the top ten at the opening round before finishing fourth overall at the second round. His first podium in the class came at the fifth round with third overall in Germany, which was then bettered at the following round by second overall in France. The following two rounds brought his first and second race wins in the category which all went towards an eventual finish of fourth in the final standings. At the opening round of the 2022 FIM Motocross World Championship, Bonacorsi was drafted into the Yamaha's factory team in the MX2 class due to an injury for Thibault Benistant. A crash in the timed practice session took him out of the weekend meaning he did not start the main races. Back in the 2023 European Motocross Championship, Bonacorsi took his first overall win in the EMX250 category at the fourth round in the sand of Sardinia. He took another race win in Germany, finishing in third overall and repeated that overall finish twice more before the end of the championship. Alongside finishing sixth in the final standings of EM250, made for wildcard appearances in the MX2 class of the world championship. He scored points at each of these and finished eighth in the first race of the Spanish round.

The 2023 European Motocross Championship would be Bonacorsi's third and last season in the EMX250 class. Winning four rounds and six individual races, he took the title with a round to spare. He made two wildcard appearances in the MX2 class of the 2023 FIM Motocross World Championship, the first at his favoured Lommel track in Belgium saw him finish sixth in the opening race. An appearance at the final round of the season saw him pick up a ninth in the last race of the year. Due to an injury for Mattia Guadagnini, Bonacorsi was a late call-up for the Italian team at the 2023 Motocross des Nations which would see him compete on a 450 for the first time. He surprised many people with his riding under the circumstances, finishing his first main race in eighth and eventually standing on the third step of the podium with his teammates. These results saw Bonacorsi promoted to the MX2 class of the 2024 FIM Motocross World Championship with the factory Yamaha team. By the fourth round, he was able to secure his first world championship top-three finish with a third in the second race.

=== 450 Career ===
With two of Yamaha's three factory MXGP class riders out with injury, the team decided to move Bonacorsi into the premier category from the fifth round of the 2024 season onwards. His height and riding style meant he adjusted to the 450 quickly, finishing sixth overall at his first round in the deep mud in Portugal. Throughout the rest of the season, he was a constant figure in the top-ten, battling with the established stars and having a highest race finish of fourth at the second Indonesian round. Despite racing MX2 for the first four rounds, Bonacorsi finished the MXGP season in tenth in the final standings. Following this, he again appeared for Italy at the 2024 Motocross des Nations with the team finishing eighth. Despite his strong results, Bonacorsi was left without a ride with the factory Yamaha team at the end of the season due to the return of the squads previously injured riders. For the 2025 FIM Motocross World Championship, Bonacrosi joined the Fantic Factory Racing MXGP team.

Bonacorsi had a strong season with the Fantic team, securing his first MXGP overall podium at the second round in Spain. He ran consistently within the top-eight throughout the rest of the season, finishing fourth overall three times and recording three third place race finishes. After ending the season eighth in the final standings, Bonacorsi represented Italy at the 2025 Motocross des Nations, where the team finished sixth overall. As the team operating the Fantic factory effort moved manufacturers to Ducati for 2026, Bonacorsi was retained and formed part of a three man team for Ducati Factory Racing MXGP. Bonacorsi had an injury strewn season aboard the Ducati, starting at the opening round where a crash caused him to be out until round four. A further injury was picked up at the Latvian round, which took longer than anticipated to recover from. Returning in Belgium, the Italian would then pick up food poisoning at the seventeenth round in Turkey, ruling him out for the final two rounds in China and Australia. To wrap off the challenging campaign, Bonacorsi was unable to recover from the virus quick enough to take his place at the 2026 Motocross des Nations, being replaced by Alberto Forato in the Italian team.

== Honours ==
Motocross des Nations

- Team Overall: 2023 (Italy) (bronze)

European Motocross Championship

- EMX250: 2023 (gold)
- EMX125: 2020 (gold)

Italian International Motocross Championship

- 125: 2019 (silver)

Italian Junior Motocross Championship

- 125 Junior: 2020 (gold)
- 85 Junior: 2015 (silver)
- 65: 2014 (silver)

== Career statistics ==
=== Motocross des Nations ===
| Year | Location | Nation | Class | Teammates | Team Overall | Individual Overall |
|---|---|---|---|---|---|---|
| 2023 | (France) Ernée | ITA | Open | Alberto Forato; Andrea Adamo | 3rd | 3rd |
| 2024 | (United Kingdom) Matterley Basin | ITA | Open | Alberto Forato; Andrea Adamo | 8th | 9th |
| 2025 | (United States) Ironman | ITA | Open | Tony Cairoli; Andrea Adamo | 6th | 6th |

=== FIM Motocross World Championship ===
==== By season ====
| Season | Class | Number | Motorcycle | Team | Race | Race Wins | Overall Wins | Race Top-3 | Overall Podium | Pts | Plcd |
|---|---|---|---|---|---|---|---|---|---|---|---|
| 2022 | MX2 | 35 | Yamaha | Monster Energy Yamaha Factory MX2 Team | 0 | 0 | 0 | 0 | 0 | 0 | 28th |
| 2022 | MX2 | 35 | Yamaha | Hutten Metaal Yamaha | 8 | 0 | 0 | 0 | 0 | 34 | 28th |
| 2023 | MX2 | 132 | Yamaha | Hutten Metaal Yamaha | 4 | 0 | 0 | 0 | 0 | 39 | 28th |
| 2024 | MX2 | 132 | Yamaha | Monster Energy Yamaha Factory MX2 Team | 8 | 0 | 0 | 1 | 0 | 83 | 21st |
| 2024 | MXGP | 132 | Yamaha | Monster Energy Yamaha Factory MXGP Team | 32 | 0 | 0 | 0 | 0 | 340 | 10th |
| 2025 | MXGP | 132 | Fantic | Fantic Factory Racing MXGP | 38 | 0 | 0 | 4 | 1 | 518 | 8th |
| 2026 | MXGP | 132 | Ducati | Red Bull Ducati Factory MXGP Team | 17 | 0 | 0 | 0 | 0 | 80 | 23rd |
| Total | | | | | 107 | 0 | 0 | 5 | 1 | 1094 | |
