= Stephen Rubini =

French motocross racer

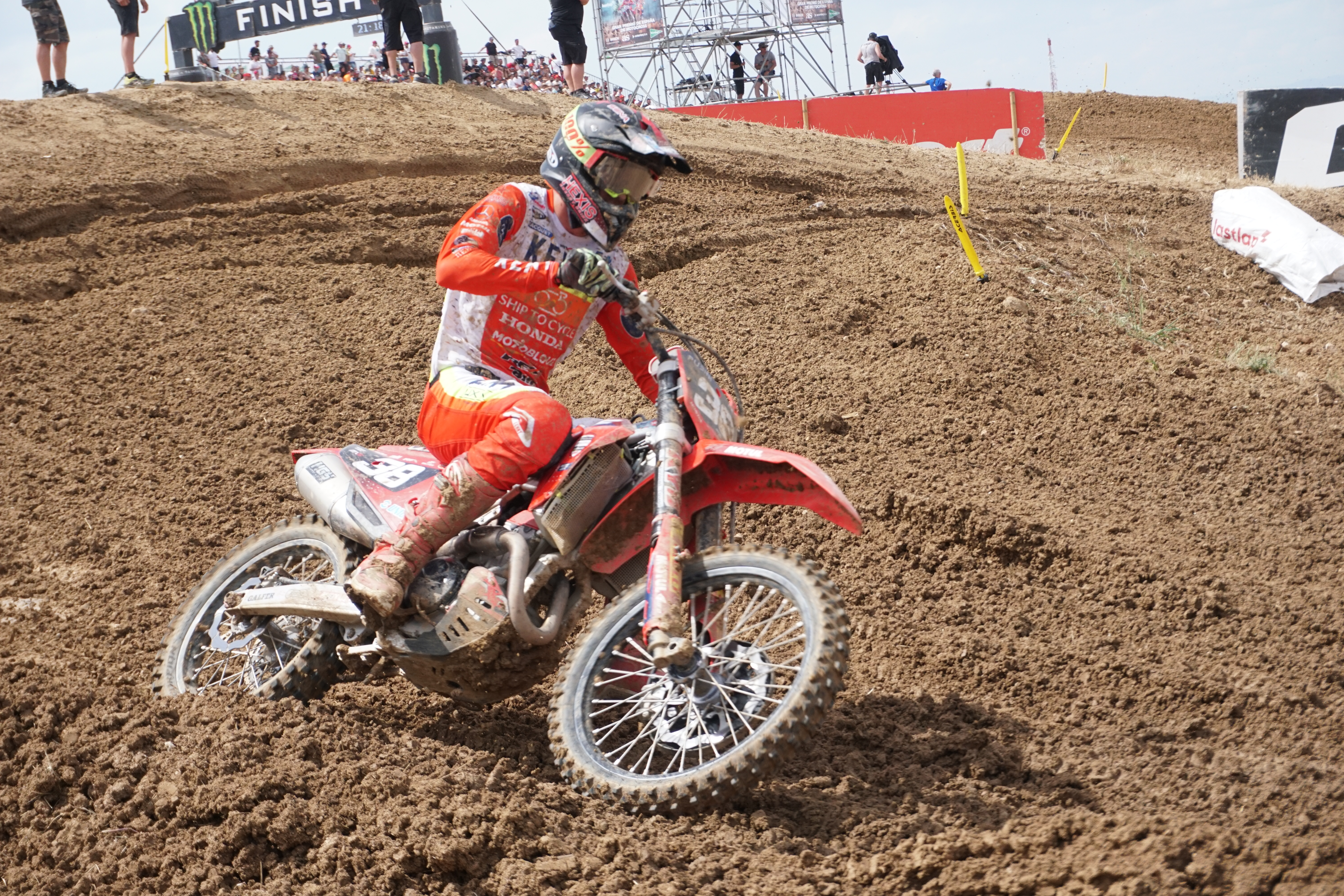
- Nationality: French
- Born: 6 January 1999 (age 27); Digne-les-Bains, France
- Current team: Gizmo Racing Yamaha
- Bike number: 106

Stephen Rubini (born 6 January 1999) is a French professional Motocross racer. Rubini competed in the FIM Motocross World Championship from 2017 to 2023.

Rubini is a two-time champion in the French Elite Motocross Championship, with his most recent title coming in the Elite MX2 class during 2019.

At European level, Rubini has finished second in both the EMX125 and EMX250 classes. He has one World Championship-level overall podium to his name, obtained at the 2022 MXGP of Italy in the MX2 class.

After not being able to secure a ride in MXGP for the 2024 season, Rubini was signed to race in Brazil. The following season, he became Brazilian Motocross Champion in the MX1 class.

Rubini has also competed in the America-based SuperMotocross World Championship, making his first full time appearance during the 2026 season.

== Career ==
=== Junior career ===
Rubini progressed through the highest levels of the junior structure in his native France. He won the Minivert 85 class in 2011 and in the following year finished third in the 85cc 'Cadet' class of the French Elite Motocross Championship. In 2013, Rubini moved up to the 'Juniors' class of the French Elite Championship for 125 machines, finishing ninth overall with three top-three finishes. He made his debut in the EMX125 class of the European Motocross Championship in 2014, riding in two rounds and not scoring any points.

2015 would mark Rubini's first full European Championship campaign, seeing him adapt to the level well with tenth in the final standings. Showing good speed on the hard pack tracks he was able to record seven top-five races finishes alongside finishing third in the Juniors class in the French Elite Championship. These results saw Rubini selected for the FIM Motocross Junior World Championship in Spain, where he finished eleventh overall in the 125 class, picking up fourth place in the opening race.

Rubini remained in the EMX125 class for the 2016 season, after being signed up by the Silver Action KTM team. In the European Motocross Championship, Rubini won six races and four overall races to finish second in the standings behind Jago Geerts despite missing the final two rounds. Domestically, Rubini won the 'Juniors' 125 title in France, winning four overall victories and ten individual races.

=== 250 Career ===
After his 2016 season ended with a wrist injury, Rubini was signed up by the Monster Energy Kawasaki Racing Team to become a factory Kawasaki rider in the MX2 class of the 2017 FIM Motocross World Championship. The step up to the MX2 class saw Rubini score sporadically throughout the season, with two ninth place race finishes at the French rounds being his most notable results. Following this, Rubini returned to the Silver Action KTM team for the 2018 FIM Motocross World Championship. In his second season in the MX2 class he showed improvement, being a regular fixture inside the points over the opening rounds before having a breakout ride in the opening race at the Russian round where he finished fifth. Unfortunately he then missed several rounds throughout the remainder of the season, but did manage to record two more top-ten race finishes, placing 23rd in the final standings.

Rubini signed for the Assomotor Honda team for the 2019 season, a move which saw him drop down into the EMX250 class of the European Motocross Championship. After the experience gained from racing in the World Championship, Rubini was an immediate front runner in the EMX250 class, ultimately fighting a tight championship battle with Roan van de Moosdijk and Alberto Forato. The campaign would see Rubini win three rounds of the season and four individual race wins within that. After his double race win at the German round, Rubini was leading the championship with two rounds together. However, after being outscored by van de Moosdijk in the sand of Lommel, Rubini ultimately finished runner-up by six points. This would not be the case in the French Elite Motocross Championship though, where he won five races on the way to his first senior domestic title in the Elite MX2 class.

Rubini stayed with the Assomotor Honda team for 2020, moving back into the MX2 class of the 2020 FIM Motocross World Championship. After competing in every round of the season, Rubini progressed to become a consistent top-ten finisher, with two fifth places being the highlights of his year contributing to tenth in the final standings. In the 2021 FIM Motocross World Championship season, Rubini missed several rounds only appearing in the top-ten twice and suffering from injury problems. The 2022 FIM Motocross World Championship season would be his last in the MX2 class due to the under-23 age rule. Moving to the Ship to Cycle Honda SR Motoblouz team, Rubini had his best season to date at World Championship level. He returned to his 2021 form in the early part of the season, with a fifth in the first race of the year. At the seventh round in Italy, a second in the opening race contributed in him finishing third overall, his first World Championship podium. A further third in the opening race at the Spanish round was his best result of the rest of the season a he finished ninth in the final standings.

=== 450 Career ===
Rubini remained with the same SR Motoblouz team for his transition to a 450, but only competed in three rounds of the MXGP class of the 2023 FIM Motocross World Championship. Focussing on the Elite MX1 class of the 2023 French Elite Motocross Championship, he won three rounds and finished as runner-up to teammate Valentin Guillod. Later in the season, he raced the final three rounds of the 2023 AMA National Motocross Championship scoring 26 points in the 450 class. Rubini then finished his season by racing the final two rounds of the Brazilian Motocross Championship, winning both events. Following this, Rubini signed for the Honda Racing Brasil team to compete in Brazil full-time for the 2024 season. This resulted in the Frenchman finishing runner-up in the MX1 standings with five race wins to his name.

Remaining in Brazil for the 2025 season, Rubini was able to win the title in the MX1 class. For the 2026 season, Rubini made the move to compete in America full-time, signing for the Gizmo Racing Yamaha team for 450 supercross and motocross. His debut supercross season came to an early end after he was injured at the second round of the 2026 AMA Supercross Championship. Rubini returned from injury at the third round of the 2026 AMA National Motocross Championship but struggled to make an impact in the series, scoring twenty-three points across the remaining rounds.

== Honours ==
European Motocross Championship

- EMX250: 2019 (silver)
- EMX125: 2016 (silver)

French Elite Motocross Championship

- Elite MX1: 2023 (silver)
- Elite MX2: 2019 (gold)
- Juniors: 2016 (gold) , 2015 (bronze)
- Cadet: 2012 (bronze)

French Motocross Championship

- Minivert 85: 2011 (gold)

Brazilian Motocross Championship

- MX1: 2025 (gold) , 2024 (silver)

== Career statistics ==
=== FIM Motocross World Championship ===
==== By season ====
Season	Class	Number 106	Motorcycle	Team	Race	Race Wins	Overall Wins	Race Top-3	Overall Podium	Pts	Plcd
2017	MX2	118	Kawasaki	Monster Energy CLS Kawasaki	29	0	0	0	0	70	27th
2018	MX2	118	KTM	KTM Silver Action	22	0	0	0	0	107	23rd
2019	MX2	118	Honda	Team Honda RedMoto Assomotor	2	0	0	0	0	0	N/A
2020	MX2	118	Honda	Honda Racing Assomotor	34	0	0	0	0	279	10th
2021	MX2	118	Honda	Team Honda Racing Assomotor	25	0	0	0	0	142	18th
2022	MX2	38	Honda	Team Ship to Cycle Honda SR Motoblouz	36	0	0	2	1	384	9th
2023	MXGP	38	Honda	Team Ship to Cycle Honda SR Motoblouz	5	0	0	0	0	27	31st
Total					153	0	0	2	1	1009	

=== AMA Supercross Championship ===
==== By season ====
Season	Class	Number	Motorcycle	Team	Overall Wins	Overall Podium	Pts	Plcd
2026	450SX	106	Yamaha	Gizmo Racing Yamaha	0	0	0	n/a
Total					0	0	0	

=== AMA National Motocross Championship ===
==== By season ====
Season	Class	Number	Motorcycle	Team	Races	Race Wins	Overall Wins	Race Top-3	Overall Podium	Pts	Plcd
2023	450	106	Kawasaki	TPJ Fly Racing Team	6	0	0	0	0	26	31st
2026	450	106	Yamaha	Gizmo Racing Yamaha	16	0	0	0	0	23	32nd
