= Alberto Forato =

Italian motocross racer

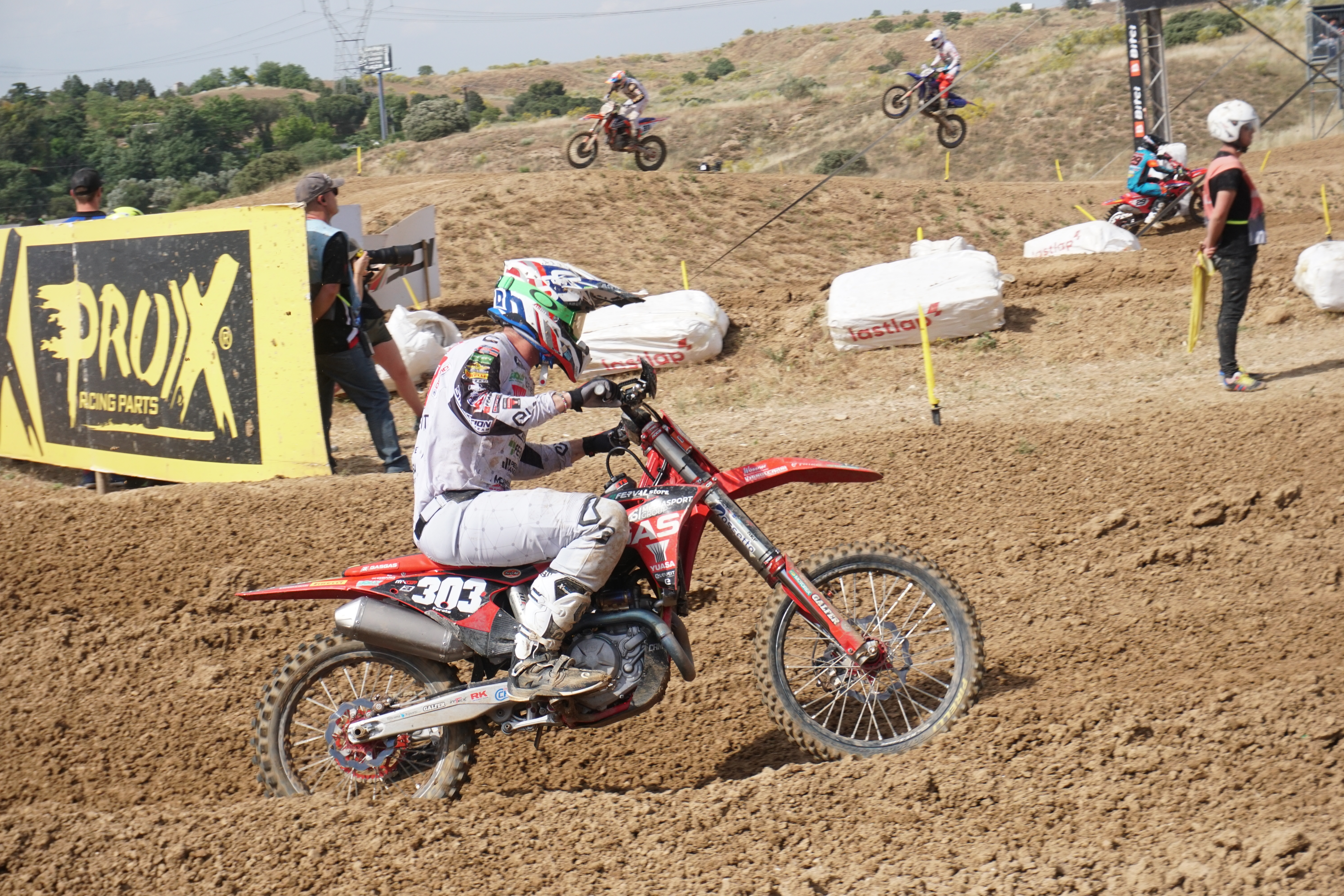
- Nationality: Italian
- Born: 30 March 2000 (age 26); Feltre, Italy
- Current team: Fantic Factory Racing MXGP
- Bike number: 303

Alberto Forato (born 30 March 2000) is an Italian professional Motocross racer. He has been competing in the FIM Motocross World Championship since 2019.

Forato has represented his nation at the Motocross des Nations four times, including being part of the team that finished in third at the 2023 edition.

Forato has won two MX1 Elite class titles as part of the Italian Prestige Motocross Championship with his last coming in the 2023 season.

== Career ==
=== Junior career ===
Forato first competed at a European level during the 2013 European Motocross Championship, in the EMX150 Honda class. In what was the inaugural season of the class, Forato finished runner-up in the final standings. In 2014, he moved onto a 125 and concentrated on the Italian domestic scene, racing in the Junior 125 class and finishing the season as the second placed 'rookie' rider. He debuted in the EMX125 class of the 2014 European Motocross Championship at the opening round in Trentino, scoring no points.

=== 250 Career ===
By 2015, Forato had already moved onto a 250cc machine, returning to riding a Honda. Again, his main racing efforts were concentrated in the Italian domestic scene. Moving full-time to the MX2 class, Forato placed within the top-20 throughout the season and eventually finished fifth in the under-21 subcategory. He made one appearance in the EMX250 class of the 2015 European Motocross Championship, failing to score in both races.

Forato signed for the new Assomotor Honda Junior Team in 2016, which would allow him to race the EMX250 championship alongside his normal Italian Championship duties. With this support, he was able to register several points scoring finishes in the EMX250 championship, culminating with fourth overall in Ottobiano. Domestically, he was able to become Under-21 Italian Champion, a class that was run within the MX2 category. He stayed with the Assomotor team for the 2017 European Motocross Championship, where he had a breakthrough season in EMX250. He made an immediate impact by finishing third in the first race at round one in Trentino and posted several more top-ten results before taking his first European Championship race win in the second race at the French round. This came after he charged through the top-ten to make a pass on his teammate Mathys Boisramé on the last lap and allowed him to finish third overall for his first EMX250 podium. He consistently posted top-ten finishes in the remaining rounds to end fourth in the final standings. In Italy, he finished 12th overall in the MX2 class in the first season he was classified as an 'Elite' rider.

The 2018 season turned out to be a tougher campaign for Forato, with him finishing 14th in the 2018 European Motocross Championship and only competing a part-campaign in the Italian Championship. 2019 marked a change of direction for Forato, with him joining the Maddii Racing Husqvarna team, a change of team and manufacturer. Forato started the 2019 European Motocross Championship in the best possible way, by winning both races at the opening round in Great Britain in a dominant fashion. The following week he made his World Championship debut in the MX2 class of the 2019 FIM Motocross World Championship as a wildcard, achieving impressive scores including seventh in the second race. Returning to the EMX250 class, he again obtained a maximum score at the second round and after holding the championship lead got involved in a tight battle against Stephen Rubini and Roan van de Moosdijk. Despite picking up more overall podiums, he did not return to race winning ways until the final round and did not take another overall victory. In what was a close race he eventually finished third in the standings, which was the same position he obtained in that season's MX2 class in the Italian Championship. After his strong results, he competed in the last two MX2 world championship rounds in Turkey and China, finishing in the top-ten twice in Turkey. After these results and due to injuries to other riders, Forato was selected to represent Italy at the 2019 Motocross des Nations. He again performed impressively finishing fifth in his Saturday qualifying race and helping his country to 16th in the final standings.

Forato stayed with Maddii Racing team in 2020 but moved up to compete in the MX2 class of 2020 FIM Motocross World Championship full-time. He had a strong start to the COVID-19 effected season, placing fifth in the very first race. However, injuries meant that he missed multiple rounds and resulted in him finishing in 16th in the final standings.

=== 450 Career ===
It was initially planned that Forato would remain in the MX2 class when he signed for the SM Action Gas Gas team for the 2021 FIM Motocross World Championship. However, due to his height and build, it was decided that he would move up to MXGP instead two months before the start of the season. After struggling for points in the opening rounds, he improved to become a consistent point scorer, with a standout result at the second Turkish round with sixth overall.

The 2022 FIM Motocross World Championship would see Forato improve drastically in the MXGP class. He routinely recorded top-ten race finishes, including a fourth place in the first race in Latvia. Despite missing two rounds due to injury, he managed to finish eleventh in the final standings, as well as winning his first Italian Elite Motocross Championship in the MX1 class dominantly. Forato again improved throughout the 2023 season, finishing the majority of the races in the top-ten. His push further towards the front culminated at the penultimate round in Maggiora, where he won the Saturday qualifier to secure his first pole position, before finishing the first race in third to secure his first Grand Prix top-three. This resulted in seventh in the final standings alongside him successfully defending his Italian Prestige MX1 Championship title. He then made his second appearance for Italy at the Motocross des Nations. After a tough qualifying for the nation, Forato and his teammates were able to climb the podium and finish third overall.

Forato moved to the Standing Construct Honda MXGP team for the 2024 FIM Motocross World Championship. Having surgery for a thumb injury a week before the start of the season meant he could not race at the opening round. Following this, he had a big crash training for the second round of the season, resulting in eight broken ribs and a collapsed lung. He returned to world championship action at the thirteenth round and despite his long time away from action was able to improve over the final part of the season. After an injury at the final round for Mattia Guadagnini, Forato was drafted into compete for his country at the 2024 Motocross des Nations. Following the conclusion of the season, it was announced that Forato had signed for the Honda Motoblouz team for the 2025 FIM Motocross World Championship. In what was an injury plagued year, Forato only competed in seven Grand Prix, eventually ending his season after the Finnish round due to required knee surgery.

Forato moved to compete for the Fantic Factory Racing MXGP team for the 2026 season. At the pre-season Italian International Championship, Forato was able to finish second overall in the final standings of the two race series. Forato spent the first half of the 2026 FIM Motocross World Championship battling on the fringes of the top-ten, with two sixth overall place finishes in Sardinia and Germany being the highlights. At the twelfth round in Great Britain, he fractured a shoulder blade, which saw him miss the following four rounds. He returned for the seventeenth round in Turkey but did not travel to the final two rounds in China and Australia. With injury taking out Andrea Bonacorsi, Forato represented Italy for the fourth time at the 2026 Motocross des Nations. A fourth in his qualifying race was followed by a sixth and twelfth place finishes in the main races, with the Italian team finishing sixth for the second year running.

== Honours ==
Motocross des Nations

- Team Overall: 2023 (Italy) (bronze)

European Motocross Championship

- EMX250: 2019 (bronze)
- EMX150: 2013 (silver)

Italian Prestige Motocross Championship

- MX1: 2022, 2023 (gold)
- MX2: 2019 (bronze)
- U21: 2016 (gold)

Italian International Motocross Championship

- MX1: 2026 (silver)

Italian Junior Motocross Championship

- Junior 125 - 'Rookie': 2014 (silver)

== Career statistics ==
=== Motocross des Nations ===
Year	Location	Nation	Class	Teammates	Team Overall	Individual Overall
2019	(Netherlands) Assen	ITA	MX2	Ivo Monticelli; Alessandro Lupino	16th	14th
2023	(France) Ernée	ITA	MXGP	Andrea Adamo; Andrea Bonacorsi	3rd	7th
2024	(United Kingdom) Matterley Basin	ITA	MXGP	Andrea Adamo; Andrea Bonacorsi	8th	6th
2026	(France) Ernée	ITA	MXGP	Ferruccio Zanchi; Andrea Adamo	6th	5th

=== FIM Motocross World Championship ===
==== By season ====
Season	Class	Number	Motorcycle	Team	Race	Race Wins	Overall Wins	Race Top-3	Overall Podium	Pts	Plcd
2019	MX2	303	Husqvarna	Team Maddii Racing Husqvarna	8	0	0	0	0	68	27th
2020	MX2	303	Husqvarna	Husqvarna Junior Racing Maddii	20	0	0	0	0	156	16th
2021	MXGP	303	Gas Gas	SM Action GasGas Racing Team Yuasa Battery	31	0	0	0	0	119	18th
2022	MXGP	303	Gas Gas	SM Action Racing Team Yuasa Battery	31	0	0	0	0	280	11th
2023	MXGP	303	KTM	SM Action Racing Team Yuasa Battery	35	0	0	1	0	490	7th
2024	MXGP	303	Honda	Standing Construct Honda MXGP	16	0	0	0	0	160	19th
2025	MXGP	303	Honda	Team Honda Motoblouz SR Motul	14	0	0	0	0	72	25th
2026	MXGP	303	Fantic	Fantic Factory Racing MXGP	24	0	0	0	0	221	15th
Total					179	0	0	1	0	1566	
