= 2019 European Motocross Championship =

The 2019 European Motocross Championship was the 31st European Motocross Championship season since it was revived in 1988. It included 15 events and 5 different classes. It started at Matterley Basin in Great Britain on 24 March, and ended at Imola in Italy on 22 September. All rounds acted as support classes at the European rounds of the 2019 MXGP.

== EMX250 ==
A 9-round calendar for the 2019 season was announced on 25 October 2018. EMX250 is for riders competing on 4-stroke motorcycles between 175cc-250cc. For 2019, an age restriction has been placed on the class, meaning only riders under the age of 23 are allowed to compete.

=== EMX250 ===
Round	Date	Grand Prix	Location	Race 1 Winner	Race 2 Winner	Round Winner	Report
1	24 March	Great Britain	Matterley Basin	(Italy) Alberto Forato	(Italy) Alberto Forato	(Italy) Alberto Forato	Report
2	7 April	Italy	Pietramurata	(Italy) Alberto Forato	(Italy) Alberto Forato	(Italy) Alberto Forato	Report
3	26 May	France	St Jean d'Angely	(France) Stephen Rubini	(Netherlands) Roan van de Moosdijk	(France) Stephen Rubini	Report
4	9 June	Russia	Orlyonok	(Netherlands) Roan van de Moosdijk	(France) Stephen Rubini	(Netherlands) Roan van de Moosdijk	Report
5	16 June	Latvia	Kegums	(Netherlands) Roan van de Moosdijk	(Netherlands) Roan van de Moosdijk	(Netherlands) Roan van de Moosdijk	Report
6	23 June	Germany	Teutschenthal	(France) Stephen Rubini	(France) Stephen Rubini	(France) Stephen Rubini	Report
7	4 August	Belgium	Lommel	(Netherlands) Roan van de Moosdijk	(Netherlands) Roan van de Moosdijk	(Netherlands) Roan van de Moosdijk	Report
8	25 August	Sweden	Uddevalla	(Denmark) Mikkel Haarup	(Italy) Alberto Forato	(France) Stephen Rubini	Report

=== Entry list ===
Team	Constructor	No	Rider	Rounds
Buildbase Honda Racing	Honda	3	(United Kingdom) Josh Gilbert	1–7
KTM Sarholz	KTM	4	(Austria) Marcel Stauffer	6
SHR Motorsports	KTM	6	(Germany) Nico Koch	1–3, 6–8
ESP MX Racing Team	Husqvarna	7	(Germany) Maximilian Spies	1–3, 5–8
Team Green Kawasaki	Kawasaki	9	(United Kingdom) Lewis Hall	1–3
Team Green Kawasaki	Kawasaki	429	(United Kingdom) Keenan Hird	1
Hutten Metaal Yamaha Racing	Yamaha	10	(Netherlands) Raivo Dankers	All
Rockstar Energy Husqvarna	Husqvarna	11	(Denmark) Mikkel Haarup	7–8
	Yamaha	13	(Belgium) Nolan Cordens	
Team KTM Switzerland	KTM	14	(Switzerland) Maurice Chanton	1
Falcon Motorsports	KTM	15	(Lithuania) Dovydas Karka	5, 7
WZ Racing Team	KTM	16	(Latvia) Kārlis Sabulis	1–3
WZ Racing Team	KTM	403	(Denmark) Bastian Bøgh Damm	3, 5–8
WZ Racing Team	KTM	651	(Estonia) Meico Vettik	1–2
WZ Racing Team	KTM	730	(Russia) Timur Petrashin	2–8
Team S11 Motorsport	Husqvarna	18	(Italy) Leonardo Angeli	1–2, 7
Team S11 Motorsport	Husqvarna	209	(Italy) Gianmarco Cenerelli	1–3, 5–7
Craigs Motorcycles Motoshack	Husqvarna	19	(United Kingdom) Tom Neal	1–3
SDM Corse Yamaha EMX250 Team	Yamaha	22	(Italy) Gianluca Facchetti	1–5, 8
SDM Corse Yamaha EMX250 Team	Yamaha	60	(Australia) Caleb Grothues	All
SDM Corse Yamaha EMX250 Team	Yamaha	70	(Spain) Rubén Fernández	1–3, 7–8
SDM Corse Yamaha EMX250 Team	Yamaha	172	(Netherlands) Rick Elzinga	All
KMP Honda Racing	Honda	23	(New Zealand) Josiah Natzke	6
KMP Honda Racing	Honda	145	(Germany) Pascal Jungmann	6–7
KMP Honda Racing	Honda	164	(Bulgaria) Nikolay Malinov	2, 7
CreyMert KTM	KTM	24	(Norway) Kevin Horgmo	1–3, 7
JWR Yamaha Racing	Yamaha	26	(Sweden) Tim Edberg	1–3, 5–8
Galvin MX Team	KTM	28	(Netherlands) Kay Ebben	7
Maggiora Park Racing Team	KTM	29	(Italy) Lorenzo Ravera	1–2
Maggiora Park Racing Team	KTM	34	(Italy) Kevin Cristino	1–3, 6
Maggiora Park Racing Team	KTM	56	(Italy) Lorenzo Corti	1–3, 6–7
Maggiora Park Racing Team	KTM	221	(Italy) Matteo Ungaro	8
Bloms MX Racing	KTM	35	(Sweden) Adam Fridlund	1
Team BBR Offroad	KTM	37	(Italy) Yuri Quarti	1–3, 6
F&H Racing Team	Kawasaki	39	(Netherlands) Roan van de Moosdijk	All
Apico Putoline Pro Carbon	KTM	41	(United Kingdom) Alexander Brown	1–2
	Yamaha	42	(Italy) Lorenzo Arnetoli	2
LA Racing	KTM	45	(Finland) Aleksi Kurvinen	5
Vega Solutions Pol Motors	KTM	48	(United Kingdom) Adam Collings	1, 3
Hitachi KTM fuelled by Milwaukee	KTM	49	(United Kingdom) Callum Green	1
MR Team	Yamaha	50	(Italy) Paolo Lugana	2–3, 5
	KTM	52	(Sweden) Albin Gerhardsson	5, 7–8
Diga Racing	KTM	53	(Belgium) Greg Smets	7–8
Diga Racing	KTM	125	(Finland) Emil Weckman	1–4
Diga Racing	KTM	249	(France) Matheo Miot	1–2
Diga Racing	KTM	772	(Belgium) Jarni Kooij	6–8
HCR Yamaha Apico Factory Racing	Yamaha	61	(United Kingdom) Tom Grimshaw	1–3, 6
HCR Yamaha Apico Factory Racing	Yamaha	365	(United Kingdom) Sam Nunn	6–7
MX4 Dobele	Yamaha	62	(Latvia) Arnolds Sniķers	2, 5
TBS Conversions KTM	KTM	65	(Belgium) Wannes Van de Voorde	7
Team Ausio Yamaha	Yamaha	67	(Spain) Yago Martinez	2–3, 6–7
	KTM	73	(Belgium) Romain Delbrassinne	2, 6–7
Honda 114 Motorsports	Honda	78	(France) Axel Louis	1–3, 6, 8
Honda 114 Motorsports	Honda	341	(Japan) Chihiro Notsuka	1–5
Z & B Racing Team	Yamaha	79	(Switzerland) Cyril Zurbrügg	1, 3
Yamaha SM Action - MC Migliori	Yamaha	80	(Italy) Andrea Adamo	2–3, 5–8
Maddii Racing	Husqvarna	81	(Netherlands) Raf Meuwissen	1–5, 7
Maddii Racing	Husqvarna	101	(Italy) Mattia Guadagnini	5
Maddii Racing	Husqvarna	303	(Italy) Alberto Forato	All
SKS Racing	Husqvarna	84	(Netherlands) Boyd van der Voorn	6–7
Brunetti Motors	KTM	86	(Italy) Matteo Del Coco	7
Verde Substance KTM	KTM	90	(United Kingdom) Dominic Lancett	1
Verde Substance KTM	KTM	413	(United Kingdom) Liam Knight	
	KTM	91	(Russia) Victor Khodyrev	5
CEC Husqvarna Scandinavia	Husqvarna	96	(Sweden) Ken Bengtson	7–8
SIMA	KTM	97	(Bulgaria) Michael Ivanov	1–3, 5–6
MJC Yamaha	Yamaha	98	(France) Thibault Benistant	All
VHR KTM	KTM	100	(France) Scotty Verhaeghe	3–5
Team Diga-Procross Husqvarna	Husqvarna	104	(Germany) Jeremy Sydow	1, 4–8
Team Diga-Procross Husqvarna	Husqvarna	368	(Sweden) Filip Olsson	All
Genot Racing KTM Team	KTM	105	(Belgium) Cyril Genot	3
Ghidinelli Yamaha	Yamaha	110	(Italy) Matteo Puccinelli	1–3, 5
Ghidinelli Yamaha	Yamaha	132	(Spain) Mahy Villanueva	2–3, 6
Ghidinelli Yamaha	Yamaha	223	(Italy) Giuseppe Tropepe	1–6
Team Motormix Husqvarna	Husqvarna	111	(Italy) Alessandro Manucci	2–3, 6–7
Craigs Motorcycles	KTM	115	(United Kingdom) Ashton Dickinson	1
Cofain Racing Team	KTM	116	(Austria) Manuel Perkhofer	2
GL12 Racing	KTM	117	(United Kingdom) Ike Carter	1
Team Honda Redmoto Assomotor	Honda	118	(France) Stephen Rubini	All
Team Honda Redmoto Assomotor	Honda	720	(France) Pierre Goupillon	1–2
	Husqvarna	121	(Belgium) Adrien Wagener	7
RSR Plant Services	KTM	122	(Republic of Ireland) Jake Sheridan	7
Putoline Husqvarna Planet Suspension	Husqvarna	123	(United Kingdom) Finley Beard	1, 7
Husqvarna Spain	Husqvarna	124	(Spain) Simeo Ubach	1–3, 5–8
Team Lakerveld Racing	KTM	126	(Netherlands) Nick Leerkes	7
Trevor Pope KTM UK	KTM	128	(United Kingdom) Michael Ellis	1
2B-One Motosport Kawasaki	Kawasaki	129	(Norway) Sander Agard-Michelsen	1–2, 6–8
Cross Centeret Snellingen	Husqvarna	135	(Norway) Runar Sudmann	
I-Fly JK Racing Yamaha	Yamaha	142	(Finland) Jere Haavisto	1–3
I-Fly JK Racing Yamaha	Yamaha	371	(Italy) Manuel Iacopi	6–7
Motostar Husqvarna Scandinavia	Husqvarna	147	(Sweden) Pontus Jönsson	8
Crescent Yamaha MX Team	Yamaha	149	(United Kingdom) John Adamson	7
	KTM	151	(Russia) Sergey Kurashev	4
Team Aventure Moto-Sport	Husqvarna	176	(France) Jean-Loup Lepan	3, 6–8
KTM Estonia	KTM	178	(Estonia) Hans Priidel	5, 8
	Husqvarna	180	(Sweden) Leopold Ambjörnsson	3–5
GPR MX Team	Husqvarna	184	(United Kingdom) James Carpenter	1–3, 5–6
Team Specialmontering	Yamaha	192	(Denmark) Glen Meier	1–3, 7–8
Team SteelsDrJack Fly Over	KTM	211	(Italy) Nicholas Lapucci	1–3, 5–6
RFX KTM Racing	KTM	212	(United Kingdom) Ben Clark	1, 3, 6
HT Group Racing Team	KTM	224	(Czech Republic) Jakub Teresak	1, 5
Team Diana MX	Husqvarna	227	(Italy) Matteo Giarrizzo	2
Celestini KTM	KTM	228	(Italy) Emilio Scuteri	1
SixtyTwo Motosport Husqvarna	Husqvarna	237	(Slovenia) Luka Milec	6
KINI KTM Junior Pro Team	KTM	239	(Germany) Lion Florian	1–3, 5, 8
KINI KTM Junior Pro Team	KTM	711	(Austria) Rene Hofer	All
	Husqvarna	242	(United Kingdom) Jack Bintcliffe	1–3, 7
Delta Yamaha	Yamaha	253	(Slovenia) Jan Pancar	
A1M Husqvarna	Husqvarna	258	(Estonia) Johannes Nermann	1
A1M Husqvarna	Husqvarna	261	(Estonia) Jörgen-Matthias Talviku	5
A1M Husqvarna	Husqvarna		(Estonia) Henry Vesilind	
HB Yamaha Racing	Yamaha	268	(France) Thibault Maupin	1
Fly Group Team	Husqvarna	292	(Spain) Alex Gamboa	
Mafi Yamaha Scandinavia	Yamaha	294	(Sweden) Andre Högberg	7–8
Team MC Sport	Husqvarna	296	(Sweden) Fredrik Theorell	2, 5, 8
KTM Team Theiner	KTM	300	(Germany) Noah Ludwig	1–2, 6
Team Tøndel	Husqvarna	302	(Norway) Cornelius Tøndel	1–2, 5–8
3MX Team Motorsport	TM	311	(Italy) Mirko Dal Bosco	2
Team KTM Racestore Max Bart	KTM	313	(Italy) Tommaso Isdraele	6
	KTM	319	(France) Jimmy Grajwoda	
SF Racing	KTM	320	(United Kingdom) Calum Mitchell	1
	KTM	338	(Belgium) Tallon Verhelst	7
MC Sport Racing Team	Husqvarna	351	(Sweden) Jeff Oxelmark	8
Speedtool Racing	Husqvarna	354	(Sweden) Viking Lindström	2, 7–8
Speedtool Racing	Husqvarna	464	(Sweden) Rasmus Håkansson	1–2, 7–8
	KTM	360	(Russia) Denis Dmitriyev	4
137 Motorsport KTM	KTM	422	(Finland) Kimi Koskinen	5
	Husqvarna	425	(Russia) Alexander Shershnev	4
	Honda	427	(Norway) Håkon Fredriksen	1–2, 5–8
NDMX	KTM	432	(Sweden) Elix Ruth	1
Team Motorrad Waldmann	Honda	491	(Germany) Paul Haberland	6–7
Team GSM	Yamaha	494	(France) Romain Pape	1–2
DUUST Diverse Racing	KTM	501	(Poland) Maciej Więckowski	5
KTM Scandinavia	KTM	505	(Sweden) Arvid Lüning	1–2, 5–8
	Husqvarna	511	(Italy) Pablo Caspani	8
KTM Scandinavia/JE68	KTM	517	(Sweden) Isak Gifting	1–3, 5–8
STC Racing	Yamaha	519	(Spain) Jose Antonio Aparicio	7–8
Bud Racing - Kawasaki	Kawasaki	520	(France) Jimmy Clochet	All
	KTM	537	(Netherlands) Damian Wedage	7
RHR Racing	Yamaha	575	(United Kingdom) Taylor Hammal	1
Martin Racing Technology	Honda	641	(Italy) Ismaele Guarise	2
	KTM	655	(Russia) Daniil Balandin	5
	KTM	715	(Netherlands) Jaap Janssen	7
Subra Motos	Husqvarna	718	(France) Henri Giraud	2
	KTM	729	(Belarus) Artsiom Sazanavets	5
	Yamaha	731	(Italy) Andrea Vendruscolo	2
Westside Racing Team	KTM	760	(Denmark) Frederik Højris	7
F4E Racing KTM	KTM	771	(Spain) Mario Lucas	1–2
	Yamaha	772	(Belgium) Jarni Kooij	1, 3
	Husqvarna	777	(Latvia) Ralfs-Edgars Ozoliņš	5
Wolff Moto	KTM	810	(France) Yann Crnjanski	3
Sturm Racing	KTM	810	(France) Yann Crnjanski	6, 8
North Europe Racing	KTM	924	(Belgium) Mattis Meersschout	1
	Yamaha	997	(Russia) Gleb Shevchenko	4–5

=== Riders Championship ===
Pos	Rider	Bike	GBR (United Kingdom)		ITA (Italy)		FRA (France)		RUS (Russia)		LAT (Latvia)		GER (Germany)		BEL (Belgium)		SWE (Sweden)		Points
1	(Netherlands) van de Moosdijk	Kawasaki	6	3	6	8	12	1	1	2	1	1	2	2	1	1	2	6	325
2	(France) Rubini	Honda	3	5	2	2	1	6	3	1	5	3	1	1	4	13	3	2	319
3	(Italy) Forato	Husqvarna	1	1	1	1	4	3	14	4	3	4	3	3	9	2	7	1	314
4	(Austria) Hofer	KTM	7	7	8	4	16	17	2	3	8	6	8	5	5	9	9	3	227
5	(France) Benistant	Yamaha	17	25	15	9	3	4	4	11	10	8	5	12	Ret	Ret	6	12	151
6	(Germany) Sydow	Husqvarna	Ret	DNS					5	8	2	5	4	4	7	7	11	7	155
7	(Italy) Tropepe	Yamaha	Ret	6	5	3	31	5	6	7	13	11	15	8					133
8	(United Kingdom) Gilbert	Honda	9	10	21	11	5	12	11	19	12	14	6	11	10	16			127
9	(Spain) Fernández	Yamaha	2	14	7	7	19	7							12	Ret	8	4	113
10	(Netherlands) Elzinga	Yamaha	34	23	23	16	6	13	8	6	9	19	13	13	Ret	Ret	14	10	104
11	(Norway) Horgmo	KTM	Ret	2	3	10	22	15							3	3			99
12	(Denmark) Bøgh Damm	KTM					37	Ret			6	9	12	7	23	4	4	8	99
13	(Netherlands) Dankers	Yamaha	DNQ	34	15	28	14	23	15	5	4	7	11	6	24	15	37	23	97
14	(Sweden) Gifting	KTM	31	28	25	29	15	10			Ret	Ret	10	9	13	6	5	5	95
15	(France) Clochet	Kawasaki	4	9	20	22	2	8	10	10	30	28	Ret	21	Ret	30	23	21	88
16	(Italy) Lapucci	KTM	16	Ret	17	12	18	2			7	20	7	10					83
17	(Latvia) Sabulis	KTM	8	12	9	5	7	11											74
18	(Denmark) Haarup	Husqvarna													2	8	1	14	67
19	(France) Goupillon	Honda	5	4	4	6													67
20	(Australia) Grothues	Yamaha	10	15	DNQ	DNQ	13	Ret	9	9	Ret	10	DNQ	DNQ	Ret	18	19	20	66
21	(Denmark) Meier	Yamaha	11	16	10	Ret	21	9							Ret	12	29	27	47
22	(Sweden) Edberg	Yamaha	15	11	DNQ	DNQ	36	Ret			17	17	20	20	Ret	24	10	15	43
23	(Italy) Adamo	Yamaha			13	19	8	27			Ret	18	9	24	21	Ret	26	17	42
24	(Norway) Fredriksen	Honda	30	24	36	24					19	16	25	22	8	14	15	16	38
25	(Norway) Tøndel	Husqvarna	DNQ	DNQ	DNQ	DNQ					15	12	Ret	33	19	Ret	12	9	38
26	(Bulgaria) Ivanov	KTM	12	8	27	14	27	24			16	27	Ret	19					36
27	(Netherlands) Meuwissen	Husqvarna	13	13	33	27	23	33	12	12	25	Ret			Ret	DNS			34
28	(Spain) Ubach	Husqvarna	23	27	14	23	11	18			18	21	16	16	25	28	Ret	24	33
29	(Sweden) Bengtson	Husqvarna													6	5	Ret	DNS	31
30	(Sweden) Olsson	Husqvarna	DNQ	DNQ	32	34	32	28	13	13	24	13	18	Ret	Ret	Ret	17	Ret	31
31	(Italy) Guadagnini	Husqvarna									14	2							29
32	(Italy) Quarti	KTM	22	18	12	32	24	14					21	17					23
33	(Russia) Petrashin	KTM			DNQ	DNQ	30	32	7	14	20	Ret	Ret	DNS	DNQ	DNQ	22	22	22
34	(Sweden) Gehardsson	KTM									22	23			14	10	18	Ret	21
35	(France) Crnjanski	KTM					10	29					14	18			28	30	21
36	(Germany) Florian	KTM	Ret	29	24	15	29	20			DNS	DNS					16	13	20
37	(Sweden) Jönsson	Husqvarna															13	11	18
38	(Estonia) Talviku	Husqvarna									11	15							16
39	(Japan) Notsuka	Honda	14	17	Ret	DNS	DNQ	DNQ	16	Ret	DNQ	DNQ							16
40	(Italy) Cristino	KTM	DNQ	DNQ	DNQ	DNQ	9	19					22	25					14
41	(Netherlands) Ebben	KTM													11	17			14
42	(Finland) Haavisto	Yamaha	20	32	11	Ret	DNQ	DNQ											11
43	(United Kingdom) Adamson	Yamaha													Ret	11			10
44	(Sweden) Ambjörnsson	Husqvarna					DNQ	DNQ	17	15	DNQ	DNQ							10
45	(France) Pape	Yamaha	25	22	30	13													8
46	(Italy) Lugana	Yamaha			18	25	Ret	16			23	Ret							8
47	(Italy) Cenerelli	Husqvarna	27	Ret	Ret	26	28	30			34	Ret	Ret	14	DNQ	DNQ			7
48	(Sweden) Hakansson	Husqvarna	DNQ	DNQ	DNQ	DNQ									15	25	21	32	6
49	(New Zealand) Natzke	Honda											23	15					6
50	(Russia) Dmitriyev	KTM							19	17									6
51	(Russia) Shevchenko	Yamaha							18	18	DNQ	DNQ							6
52	(Norway) Agard-Michelsen	Kawasaki	DNQ	DNQ	DNS	33							28	23	16	21	25	28	5
53	(Russia) Shershnev	Husqvarna							Ret	16									5
54	(Italy) Ravera	KTM	Ret	20	35	17													5
55	(United Kingdom) Hammal	Yamaha	18	19															5
56	(Italy) Del Coco	KTM													17	26			4
57	(Belgium) Genot	KTM					17	26											4
58	(Italy) Isdraele	KTM											17	28					4
59	(Italy) Facchetti	Yamaha	28	Ret	22	18	Ret	Ret	Ret	20	33	Ret					Ret	DNS	4
60	(Sweden) Theorell	Husqvarna			DNQ	DNQ					DNQ	DNQ					20	18	4
61	(Sweden) Lindström	Husqvarna			28	31									18	Ret	33	Ret	3
62	(Germany) Spies	Husqvarna	DNQ	DNQ	31	35	DNQ	DNQ			27	24	24	34	27	19	35	36	2
63	(Italy) Guarise	Honda			19	30													2
64	(Sweden) Oxelmark	Husqvarna															36	19	2
65	(Austria) Stauffer	KTM											19	Ret					2
66	(Switzerland) Chanton	KTM	19	Ret															2
67	(Italy) Puccinelli	Yamaha	32	26	Ret	20	26	22			Ret	Ret							1
68	(Russia) Kurashev	KTM							20	Ret									1
69	(Germany) Koch	KTM	26	Ret	DNQ	DNQ	25	25					30	27	20	23	24	26	1
70	(Lithuania) Karka	KTM									29	25			Ret	20			1
71	(Spain) Villanueva	Yamaha			26	37	20	Ret					Ret	Ret					1
	(United Kingdom) Brown	KTM	24	21	DNQ	DNQ													0
	(United Kingdom) Carpenter	Husqvarna	DNQ	DNQ	DNQ	DNQ	DNQ	DNQ			21	26	26	30					0
	(Italy) Corti	KTM	DNQ	DNQ	DNQ	DNQ	35	21					29	26	DNQ	DNQ			0
	(Spain) Lucas	KTM	29	31	29	21													0
	(United Kingdom) Ellis	KTM	21	Ret															0
	(Czech Republic) Teresak	KTM	DNQ	DNQ							26	22							0
	(Belgium) Smets	KTM													26	22	DNQ	37	0
	(Netherlands) Leerkes	KTM													22	Ret			0
	(Spain) Aparicio	Yamaha													DNQ	DNQ	31	25	0
	(Italy) Iacopi	Yamaha											27	29	DNQ	DNQ			0
	(Sweden) Lüning	KTM	DNQ	DNQ	DNQ	DNQ					32	30	DNQ	DNQ	DNQ	DNQ	27	31	0
	(United Kingdom) Nunn	Yamaha											DNQ	DNQ	Ret	27			0
	(Russia) Balandin	KTM									28	32							0
	(Italy) Manucci	Husqvarna			Ret	36	34	31					DNQ	DNQ	DNQ	29			0
	(Finland) Koskinen	KTM									31	29							0
	(France) Louis	Honda	DNQ	DNQ	DNQ	DNQ	DNQ	DNQ					DNQ	DNQ			34	29	0
	(Belgium) Kooij	Yamaha	DNQ	DNQ			DNQ	DNQ											0
	(Belgium) Kooij	KTM											Ret	32	Ret	31	30	34	0
	(Finland) Weckman	KTM	33	30	DNQ	DNQ	DNQ	DNQ	Ret	Ret									0
	(Estonia) Priidel	KTM									DNQ	31					32	35	0
	(Germany) Haberland	Honda											32	31	DNQ	DNQ			0
	(Germany) Ludwig	KTM	DNQ	DNQ	DNQ	DNQ							31	35					0
	(Spain) Martinez	Yamaha			34	38	DNQ	DNQ					33	Ret	Ret	DNS			0
	(United Kingdom) Grimshaw	Yamaha	DNQ	DNQ	DNQ	DNQ	33	Ret					DNQ	DNQ					0
	(France) Miot	KTM	Ret	33	DNQ	DNQ													0
	(Sweden) Högberg	Yamaha													DNQ	DNQ	DNQ	33	0
	(France) Verhaeghe	KTM					Ret	Ret	Ret	Ret	DNQ	DNQ							0
	(United Kingdom) Beard	Husqvarna	DNQ	DNQ											DNQ	Ret			0
	(Finland) Kurvinen	KTM									Ret	Ret							0
	(Latvia) Ozoliņš	Husqvarna									Ret	DNS							0
	(Netherlands) van der Voorn	Husqvarna											DNQ	Ret	DNQ	DNQ			0
	(United Kingdom) Bintcliffe	Husqvarna	DNQ	DNQ	DNQ	DNQ	DNQ	DNQ							DNQ	DNQ			0
	(France) Lepan	Husqvarna					DNQ	DNQ					DNQ	DNQ	DNQ	DNQ	DNQ	DNQ	0
	(United Kingdom) Hall	Kawasaki	DNQ	DNQ	DNQ	DNQ	DNQ	DNQ											0
	(United Kingdom) Neal	Husqvarna	DNQ	DNQ	DNQ	DNQ	DNQ	DNQ											0
	(Italy) Angeli	Husqvarna	DNQ	DNQ	DNQ	DNQ									DNQ	DNQ			0
	(United Kingdom) Clark	KTM	DNQ	DNQ			DNQ	DNQ					DNQ	DNQ					0
	(Belgium) Delbrassinne	KTM			DNQ	DNQ							DNQ	DNQ	DNQ	DNQ			0
	(Estonia) Vettik	KTM	DNQ	DNQ	DNQ	DNQ													0
	(Switzerland) Zurbrügg	Yamaha	DNQ	DNQ			DNQ	DNQ											0
	(United Kingdom) Collings	KTM	DNQ	DNQ			DNQ	DNQ											0
	(Latvia) Sniķers	Yamaha			DNQ	DNQ					DNQ	DNQ							0
	(Bulgaria) Malinov	KTM			DNQ	DNQ									DNQ	DNQ			0
	(Germany) Jungmann	Honda											DNQ	DNQ	DNQ	DNQ			0
	(Estonia) Nermann	Husqvarna	DNQ	DNQ															0
	(France) Maupin	Yamaha	DNQ	DNQ															0
	(Belgium) Meersschout	KTM	DNQ	DNQ															0
	(Sweden) Fridlund	KTM	DNQ	DNQ															0
	(Sweden) Ruth	KTM	DNQ	DNQ															0
	(United Kingdom) Green	KTM	DNQ	DNQ															0
	(Italy) Scuteri	KTM	DNQ	DNQ															0
	(United Kingdom) Dickinson	KTM	DNQ	DNQ															0
	(United Kingdom) Hird	Kawasaki	DNQ	DNQ															0
	(United Kingdom) Mitchell	KTM	DNQ	DNQ															0
	(United Kingdom) Carter	Husqvarna	DNQ	DNQ															0
	(United Kingdom) Lancett	KTM	DNQ	DNQ															0
	(France) Giraud	Husqvarna			DNQ	DNQ													0
	(Italy) Vendruscolo	Yamaha			DNQ	DNQ													0
	(Italy) Arnetoli	Yamaha			DNQ	DNQ													0
	(Italy) Dal Bosco	TM			DNQ	DNQ													0
	(Austria) Perkhofer	KTM			DNQ	DNQ													0
	(Italy) Giarrizzo	Husqvarna			DNQ	DNQ													0
	(Poland) Wieckowski	KTM									DNQ	DNQ							0
	(Belarus) Sazanavets	KTM									DNQ	DNQ							0
	(Russia) Khodyrev	KTM									DNQ	DNQ							0
	(Slovenia) Milec	Husqvarna											DNQ	DNQ					0
	(Republic of Ireland) Sheridan	KTM													DNQ	DNQ			0
	(Belgium) Verhelst	KTM													DNQ	DNQ			0
	(Belgium) Van de Voorde	KTM													DNQ	DNQ			0
	(Netherlands) Wedage	KTM													DNQ	DNQ			0
	(Netherlands) Janssen	KTM													DNQ	DNQ			0
	(Denmark) Højris	KTM													DNQ	DNQ			0
	(Belgium) Wagener	Husqvarna													DNQ	DNQ			0
	(Italy) Caspani	Husqvarna															DNQ	DNQ	0
	(Italy) Ungaro	KTM															DNQ	DNQ	0
Pos	Rider	Bike	GBR (United Kingdom)		ITA (Italy)		FRA (France)		RUS (Russia)		LAT (Latvia)		GER (Germany)		BEL (Belgium)		SWE (Sweden)		Points

=== Manufacturers Championship ===
Pos	Bike	GBR (United Kingdom)		ITA (Italy)		FRA (France)		RUS (Russia)		LAT (Latvia)		GER (Germany)		BEL (Belgium)		SWE (Sweden)		Points
1	Husqvarna	1	1	1	1	4	3	5	4	2	2	3	3	2	2	1	1	350
2	Kawasaki	4	3	6	8	2	1	1	2	1	1	2	2	1	1	2	6	341
3	Honda	3	4	2	2	1	6	3	1	5	3	1	1	4	13	3	2	321
4	KTM	7	2	3	4	7	2	2	3	6	6	7	5	3	3	4	3	290
5	Yamaha	2	6	5	3	3	4	4	5	4	7	5	6	8	11	6	4	264
	TM			DNQ	DNQ													0
Pos	Bike	GBR (United Kingdom)		ITA (Italy)		FRA (France)		RUS (Russia)		LAT (Latvia)		GER (Germany)		BEL (Belgium)		SWE (Sweden)		Points

== EMX125 ==
An 8-round calendar for the 2019 season was announced on 25 October 2018. EMX125 is for riders competing on 2-stroke motorcycles of 125cc.

=== EMX125 ===
Round	Date	Grand Prix	Location	Race 1 Winner	Race 2 Winner	Round Winner	Report
1	31 March	Netherlands	Valkenswaard	(Italy) Mattia Guadagnini	(France) Tom Guyon	(Italy) Mattia Guadagnini	Report
2	7 April	Italy	Pietramurata	(Italy) Mattia Guadagnini	(Italy) Mattia Guadagnini	(Italy) Mattia Guadagnini	Report
3	12 May	Italy	Mantova	(Italy) Mattia Guadagnini	(Italy) Mattia Guadagnini	(Italy) Mattia Guadagnini	Report
4	26 May	France	St Jean d'Angely	(France) Tom Guyon	(France) Tom Guyon	(France) Tom Guyon	Report
5	23 June	Germany	Teutschenthal	(Italy) Mattia Guadagnini	(France) Tom Guyon	(France) Tom Guyon	Report
6	4 August	Belgium	Lommel	(Italy) Mattia Guadagnini	(Germany) Simon Längenfelder	(Germany) Simon Längenfelder	Report
7	25 August	Sweden	Uddevalla	(Germany) Simon Längenfelder	(France) Tom Guyon	(France) Tom Guyon	Report

=== Entry list ===
Team	Constructor	No	Rider	Rounds
Team Maddii Racing Husqvarna	Husqvarna	3	(Italy) Federico Tuani	All
Team Maddii Racing Husqvarna	Husqvarna	16	(Italy) Gaetano Cassibba	2
Team Maddii Racing Husqvarna	Husqvarna	101	(Italy) Mattia Guadagnini	All
GPR Promo Team	Husqvarna	5	(Netherlands) Rob van de Veerdonk	1–3, 5–6
GPR Promo Team	Husqvarna	58	(South Africa) Cameron Durow	1, 5
	KTM	7	(Austria) Florian Dieminger	2, 5
MGR Motorcross Team	KTM	8	(Italy) Andrea Viano	2–3
MGR Motorcross Team	KTM	23	(Italy) Tommaso Sarasso	1, 3–5
MGR Motorcross Team	KTM	938	(Brazil) Rodolfo Bicalho	1–2
KTM Racing Center Antwerpen	KTM	9	(Belgium) Marnick Lagrou	1, 5–6
	KTM	11	(Netherlands) Marnicq Tuininga	6
CreyMert KTM	KTM	12	(Norway) Håkon Østerhagen	All
Rockstar Energy Husqvarna	Husqvarna	14	(Netherlands) Kay de Wolf	All
North Europe Racing Team	KTM	17	(Belgium) Junior Bal	6
MCV Motorsport KTM	KTM	22	(Italy) Raffaele Giuzio	All
RFME MX Junior Team	KTM	24	(Spain) David Braceras	1–6
RFME MX Junior Team	KTM	299	(Spain) Albert Fontova	6
RFME MX Junior Team	KTM	312	(Spain) Oriol Oliver	All
RFME MX Junior Team	KTM	384	(Spain) Gerard Congost	3–7
RFME MX Junior Team	Husqvarna	368	(Spain) Samuel Nilsson	All
Husqvarna Switzerland/Emil Weber Motos AG	Husqvarna	25	(Portugal) Alexandre Marques	1–4
Team Elsener	Yamaha	26	(Switzerland) Joel Elsener	1–2, 5
VRT KTM	KTM	27	(France) Tom Guyon	All
VRT KTM	KTM	44	(France) Saad Soulimani	1–2, 4–5
VRT KTM	KTM	869	(France) Arthur Vial	1–2, 4–5
	KTM	28	(Russia) Danil Zhilkin	1, 6
Marchetti Racing Team KTM	KTM	29	(Italy) Alessandro Facca	1–5
	KTM	30	(United Kingdom) Mark Bracegirdle	5–6
KTR MX Team	KTM	31	(Netherlands) Milan van de Bunte	1, 6
Team Piller	KTM	32	(Germany) Constantin Piller	All
Diga Racing	KTM	33	(Netherlands) Kay Karssemakers	All
Diga Racing	KTM		(Sweden) Emil Jönrup	
KTM Motorsport Metz	KTM	34	(France) Bogdan Krajewski	1–2, 4–5
Diana MX Team	Husqvarna	35	(Italy) Mattia Paglionico	1–3
Diana MX Team	Husqvarna	301	(Italy) Giuseppe Arangio Febbo	2
MH Racing	Husqvarna	36	(Germany) Nico Greutmann	1–6
Ghidinelli Racing Team	Husqvarna	37	(Italy) Max Ratschiller	2–4
I-Fly JK Racing Yamaha	Yamaha	38	(Hungary) Adam Kovacs	All
I-Fly JK Racing Yamaha	Yamaha	172	(Netherlands) Cas Valk	1
KTM Estonia	KTM	40	(Estonia) Martin Michelis	1, 5–7
	Yamaha	41	(Netherlands) Jelle Bankers	6
Team Racing Bike Finland	KTM	42	(Finland) Sampo Rainio	1–2, 6
KTM Motorsport Finland	KTM	43	(Finland) Matias Vesterinen	All
KTM Motorsport Finland	KTM	430	(Finland) Wiljam Malin	1–6
KTM Rocket Juniors	KTM	47	(Israel) Suff Sella	1–5
	Yamaha	56	(Croatia) Dominik Piskor	2
TBS Conversions KTM	KTM	65	(Belgium) Wannes Van de Voorde	1–3
TBS Conversions KTM	KTM	85	(Netherlands) Sasha Rutten	6
TBS Conversions KTM	KTM	509	(Belgium) Yoran Moens	6
	KTM	72	(Belgium) Liam Everts	All
	KTM	74	(Belgium) Robbe Daniels	1, 6
KTM Racestore MX2 Max Bart	KTM	75	(Italy) Alberto Barcella	1–6
KTM Racestore MX2 Max Bart	KTM	304	(Italy) Tiberio Mazzantini	2
Qbena Racing	KTM	81	(Sweden) Max Lövgren	7
F4E Racing KTM	KTM	83	(Belgium) Ilan Heirwegh	3–7
F4E Racing KTM	KTM	217	(United Kingdom) Eddie Wade	1–5
F4E Racing KTM	KTM	309	(Spain) Guillem Farrés	All
Team Ausio Yamaha	Yamaha	84	(Spain) Eric Tomas	2–6
Team Ausio Yamaha	Yamaha	525	(Spain) Raul Sanchez	2–4
STC Racing iXS	Yamaha	90	(Germany) Justin Trache	All
STC Racing iXS	Yamaha	150	(Spain) Carles Rosell	1–2
STC Racing iXS	Yamaha	253	(Switzerland) Kevin Brumann	All
	Husqvarna	92	(Italy) Tobias Auer	2–3
	KTM	95	(Netherlands) Davey Nieuwenhuizen	1–2
Alf Graarud Motor AS	Yamaha	97	(Norway) Råg Rindal	7
Orion Racing Team	KTM	99	(Czech Republic) Petr Rathousky	2–3, 5–6
Mollegardens Auto Odense	KTM	100	(Denmark) Niclas Jensen	7
Torino Moto Ragno114	Husqvarna	115	(Italy) Andrea Roncoli	1–6
	Yamaha	117	(Italy) Giacomo Bosi	2–3
Team Lakerveld Racing	KTM	124	(Netherlands) Kevin Simons	1, 6
	Husqvarna	129	(Italy) Niccolo Maggiora	1, 3, 6
A Team Neustrelitz	KTM	131	(Germany) Cato Nickel	All
MX Team van Hout	KTM	141	(Netherlands) Leon van Hout	1, 5–7
Team GBO Motorsports	KTM	146	(Italy) Mattia Cineroli	3
Pol Motors Husqvarna Team	Husqvarna	158	(Netherlands) Alex Van der Veen	1, 6
NR83 Team	KTM	181	(Belgium) Julian Vander Auwera	1–3
	KTM	191	(Italy) Davide Della Valle	3–5
MJC Yamaha	Yamaha	202	(Switzerland) Luca Diserens	1–2, 5
MJC Yamaha	Yamaha	247	(France) Florian Miot	1–6
MJC Yamaha	Yamaha	256	(Denmark) Magnus Smith	All
MJC Yamaha	Yamaha	397	(France) Simon Depoers	4, 6–7
VHR KTM	KTM	207	(France) Xavier Cazal	All
	Husqvarna	211	(Netherlands) Romano Aspers	1
Celestini KTM	KTM	223	(Italy) Andrea Bonacorsi	1–6
Celestini KTM	KTM	532	(Italy) Mirko Valsecchi	1–6
Gazval	Husqvarna	224	(France) Valentin Madoulaud	4
LM Racing	Husqvarna	230	(France) Enzo Casat	4
Karlströms Motor	Husqvarna	238	(Sweden) Viktor Andersson	1–2, 5–7
Jumbo NoFear BT Husqvarna	Husqvarna	242	(Netherlands) Kjell Verbruggen	1–4, 6–7
Jumbo NoFear BT Husqvarna	Husqvarna	408	(Netherlands) Scott Smulders	All
A1M Husqvarna	Husqvarna	261	(Estonia) Jörgen Mattias-Talviku	All
	Husqvarna	270	(Italy) Eugenio Barbaglia	All
Q Racing Team	Husqvarna	271	(Czech Republic) Stanislav Vasicek	5
MAFI Yamaha Scandinavia	Yamaha	294	(Sweden) Andre Högberg	1
Evolution KTM 7.1 Limoges	KTM	297	(France) Pablo Metayer	1–2, 4–5
Yamaha MX Junior Team	Yamaha	330	(Italy) Daniel Gimm	2–3, 6
Yamaha MX Junior Team	Yamaha	344	(Italy) Pietro Razzini	3–6
	Husqvarna	321	(Italy) Nicola Cristofori	2–3
HCR Yamaha	Yamaha	365	(United Kingdom) Sam Nunn	1–4
Sarholz KTM Racing Team	KTM	375	(Germany) Carl Massury	2, 5
Sarholz KTM Racing Team	KTM	470	(Germany) Peter König	1, 5
Sarholz KTM Racing Team	KTM	838	(Denmark) William Kleemann	All
Sarholz KTM Racing Team	KTM	839	(Denmark) Victor Kleemann	1–5
Talenti Azzuri FMI	KTM	399	(Italy) Alberto Ladini	2
WZ Racing Team	KTM	407	(Portugal) Afonso Gaidão	1–4, 6
WZ Racing Team	KTM	516	(Germany) Simon Längenfelder	All
WZ Racing Team	KTM	572	(Denmark) Rasmus Pedersen	1–2, 5–7
WZ Racing Team	KTM	651	(Estonia) Meico Vettik	5–7
	KTM	411	(Netherlands) Kjeld Stuurman	1–6
Husqvarna Motorcycles Scandinavia	Husqvarna	414	(Sweden) Rasmus Varg	1, 5–7
	KTM	420	(Italy) Andrea Rossi	1–4
Kosak Racing Team	KTM	422	(South Africa) Camden McLellan	All
Kosak Racing Team	KTM	502	(Czech Republic) Adam Maj	1–2, 5–6
Kosak Racing Team	KTM	543	(Germany) Nick Domann	All
ProGrip Yamaha MX United	Yamaha	424	(Russia) Nikita Kucherov	1–6
Cross Centeret Snellingen	Husqvarna	425	(Norway) Casper Olsen	1, 5, 7
JD Gunnex KTM Racing Team	KTM	431	(Czech Republic) Tomas Pikart	1–3
JD Gunnex KTM Racing Team	KTM		(Czech Republic) Radek Větrovský	
Ravenol MX Junior Team	TM	436	(Germany) Marvin Müller	
Motokrosovaskola.cz	KTM	437	(Czech Republic) Martin Venhoda	All
	KTM	440	(Germany) Marnique Appelt	1–3, 5–7
Motostar Yamaha Scandinavia	Yamaha	454	(Sweden) Liam Hanstrom	1, 5, 7
	KTM	460	(Belgium) Lucas Adam	1–5
TKS Racing	Husqvarna	468	(Germany) Lukas Fiedler	5
	Yamaha	484	(Netherlands) Dave Kooiker	1–6
Motor2000 KTM	KTM	489	(Netherlands) Jens Walvoort	All
	KTM	491	(Sweden) Elias Persson	2
E2T Racing Team	Husqvarna	540	(Sweden) Axel Semb	1–3, 6
Revo Husqvarna UK	Husqvarna	552	(United States) Larry Reyes Jr.	4
Speedtool Racing	Husqvarna	567	(Sweden) Rasmus Moen	5, 7
JE68 Racing Team	KTM	568	(Sweden) Max Palsson	1–2, 5–7
MX Moduls	Yamaha	601	(Latvia) Mairis Pumpurs	1, 5, 7
Team EMX Racing	KTM	602	(Sweden) Felix Boberg	4, 7
Team Zachmann	KTM	634	(Switzerland) Remo Schudel	
Ceres 71 Team	Yamaha	669	(Italy) Luca Ruffini	1, 3
KINI KTM Junior Pro Team	KTM	696	(Switzerland) Mike Gwerder	All
	KTM	700	(Russia) Egor Frolov	2
	Yamaha	702	(Italy) Michele Pablo D'Aniello	2–3
Garin MX Team	KTM	710	(Russia) Maksim Kraev	1–2
	KTM	717	(Czech Republic) Jan Wagenknecht	1, 5
	KTM	712	(Sweden) Filip Isaksson	7
Team Gredinger	Husqvarna	727	(Sweden) Marcus Gredinger	1–2, 6–7
	KTM	741	(Belarus) Daniel Volovich	1–2
Team HTS KTM	KTM	771	(Hungary) Kristof Jakob	3, 5–6
	Yamaha	777	(Germany) Tristan Lohmann	1–3, 5
Gebben van Venrooy	Yamaha	812	(Netherlands) Sem de Lange	1, 5
RFX KTM Racing	KTM	912	(United Kingdom) Joel Rizzi	All
	KTM	922	(France) Loris Levy	1

=== Riders Championship ===
Pos	Rider	Bike	NED (Netherlands)		TRE (Italy)		ITA (Italy)		FRA (France)		GER (Germany)		BEL (Belgium)		SWE (Sweden)		Points
1	(Italy) Guadagnini	Husqvarna	1	4	1	1	1	1	3	2	1	13	1	2	3	3	305
2	(France) Guyon	KTM	7	1	2	2	14	4	1	1	2	1	3	3	2	1	292
3	(Germany) Längenfelder	KTM	16	6	36	3	2	7	12	18	4	2	2	1	1	2	222
4	(Estonia) Talviku	Husqvarna	2	3	5	6	3	19	10	11	8	4	15	9	5	5	197
5	(Switzerland) Gwerder	KTM	9	7	8	12	4	14	4	4	3	3	5	12	4	Ret	192
6	(Netherlands) de Wolf	Husqvarna	5	2	4	4	20	6	14	3	28	6	16	4	6	4	188
7	(Spain) Oliver	KTM	4	5	10	5	7	5	11	5	6	7	11	21	7	Ret	170
8	(Belgium) Everts	KTM	17	12	7	11	9	23	18	7	10	5	6	6	10	6	149
9	(Spain) Farrés	KTM	26	11	3	8	13	3	5	Ret	DNQ	DNQ	14	14	16	15	112
10	(Italy) Bonacorsi	KTM	33	8	17	10	16	13	28	17	7	19	4	5			95
11	(Netherlands) Verbruggen	Husqvarna	6	33	19	13	6	8	Ret	28			9	35	20	9	78
12	(United Kingdom) Wade	KTM	Ret	10	Ret	27	12	2	2	9	Ret	Ret					76
13	(United Kingdom) Rizzi	KTM	3	Ret	29	33	38	24	15	21	13	14	12	7	33	12	73
14	(Sweden) Palsson	KTM	8	13	23	Ret					19	17	7	11	21	8	64
15	(Spain) Braceras	KTM	14	23	20	18	25	12	7	6	9	Ret	Ret	Ret			61
16	(Netherlands) Karssemakers	KTM	18	15	DNQ	DNQ	26	9	DNQ	DNQ	20	10	10	10	Ret	17	59
17	(France) Miot	Yamaha	10	Ret	Ret	DNS	17	Ret	8	Ret	5	8	DNS	DNS			57
18	(South Africa) McLellan	KTM	30	20	35	31	39	31	21	16	34	9	8	8	9	26	56
19	(Spain) Nilsson	Husqvarna	29	17	11	32	18	Ret	35	22	14	15	22	22	11	11	50
20	(Estonia) Vettik	KTM									12	11	31	18	8	7	49
21	(Spain) Congost	KTM					8	Ret	6	14	DNS	DNS	DNQ	DNQ	30	10	46
22	(Italy) Barcella	KTM	19	31	6	9	5	Ret	DNQ	DNQ	DNQ	DNQ	DNQ	DNQ			45
23	(Hungary) Kovacs	Yamaha	12	25	13	17	22	Ret	16	Ret	Ret	23	Ret	13	18	14	44
24	(Italy) Facca	KTM	11	14	14	15	21	10	22	24	Ret	Ret					41
25	(Finland) Vesterinen	KTM	31	26	9	7	DNQ	DNQ	31	15	24	Ret	19	16	29	27	39
26	(Italy) Giuzio	KTM	32	22	37	14	10	Ret	19	8	16	31	25	27	Ret	25	38
27	(Denmark) Pedersen	KTM	20	9	15	23					DNQ	DNQ	17	20	26	13	32
28	(Netherlands) Kooiker	Yamaha	35	18	16	24	28	17	20	27	22	12	13	28			30
29	(Italy) Roncoli	Husqvarna	24	34	12	16	19	25	17	26	26	Ret	20	15			27
30	(France) Soulimani	Husqvarna	DNQ	DNQ	DNQ	DNQ			9	13	15	24					26
31	(Italy) Valsecchi	KTM	34	32	DNQ	19	11	28	13	19	DNQ	DNQ	Ret	DNS			22
32	(Italy) Tuani	Husqvarna	DNQ	DNQ	25	21	29	21	33	10	23	16	Ret	30	24	34	16
33	(Switzerland) Brumann	Yamaha	27	19	DNQ	DNQ	DNQ	DNQ	23	31	17	18	DNQ	DNQ	14	DNS	16
34	(Denmark) Smith	Yamaha	DNQ	DNQ	27	22	Ret	18	DNQ	DNQ	18	27	27	25	17	16	15
35	(Russia) Kraev	KTM	13	16	DNQ	DNQ											13
36	(Sweden) Varg	Husqvarna	DNQ	DNQ							31	30	DNQ	DNQ	13	18	11
37	(Italy) Barbaglia	Husqvarna	37	28	DNQ	DNQ	34	Ret	DNQ	DNQ	11	22	34	Ret	28	22	10
38	(Germany) Nickel	KTM	DNQ	DNQ	DNQ	DNQ	31	11	27	30	29	25	DNQ	DNQ	25	24	10
39	(France) Vial	KTM	DNQ	DNQ	DNQ	DNQ			32	12	33	20					10
40	(Germany) Appelt	KTM	15	30	DNQ	DNQ	36	26			DNQ	DNQ	23	19	19	Ret	10
41	(Norway) Østerhagen	KTM	36	Ret	DNQ	DNQ	30	27	DNQ	DNQ	32	Ret	DNQ	DNQ	12	23	9
42	(France) Cazal	KTM	DNQ	DNQ	DNQ	DNQ	15	30	26	25	DNQ	DNQ	26	32	31	20	7
43	(Sweden) Gredinger	Husqvarna	22	Ret	DNQ	DNQ							18	17	23	35	7
44	(Norway) Olsen	Husqvarna	28	27							DNQ	DNQ			15	21	6
45	(Hungary) Jakob	KTM					27	15			Ret	Ret	DNQ	DNQ			6
46	(Netherlands) van de Veerdonk	Husqvarna	DNQ	DNQ	DNQ	DNQ	35	16			DNQ	DNQ	DNQ	DNQ			5
47	(Czech Republic) Venhoda	KTM	DNQ	DNQ	18	25	DNQ	DNQ	29	20	DNQ	DNQ	DNQ	DNQ	Ret	28	4
48	(Netherlands) Smulders	Husqvarna	DNQ	DNQ	DNQ	DNQ	DNQ	DNQ	DNQ	DNQ	DNQ	DNQ	30	34	22	19	2
49	(Germany) Greutmann	Husqvarna	23	24	22	20	23	20	DNQ	DNQ	21	Ret	DNQ	DNQ			2
	(Finland) Malin	KTM	21	21	DNQ	DNQ	DNQ	DNQ	DNQ	DNQ	DNQ	DNQ	DNQ	DNQ			0
	(Netherlands) Stuurman	KTM	DNQ	DNQ	DNQ	DNQ	DNQ	DNQ	DNQ	DNQ	DNQ	DNQ	21	23			0
	(Israel) Sella	KTM	DNQ	DNQ	32	29	DNQ	DNQ	DNQ	DNQ	30	21					0
	(Russia) Kucherov	Yamaha	DNQ	DNQ	21	36	DNQ	DNQ	DNQ	DNQ	DNQ	DNQ	DNQ	DNQ			0
	(Germany) Domann	KTM	DNQ	DNQ	DNQ	DNQ	37	22	Ret	Ret	27	Ret	DNQ	DNQ	27	32	0
	(Belgium) Adam	KTM	DNQ	DNQ	DNQ	DNQ	DNQ	DNQ	Ret	23	Ret	26					0
	(Italy) Ratschiller	Husqvarna			24	28	24	33	Ret	Ret							0
	(Germany) Piller	KTM	DNQ	DNQ	DNQ	DNQ	DNQ	DNQ	24	32	DNQ	DNQ	DNQ	33	32	29	0
	(Finland) Rainio	KTM	DNQ	DNQ	DNQ	DNQ							29	24			0
	(France) Depoers	Yamaha							DNQ	DNQ			24	29	DNQ	DNQ	0
	(Czech Republic) Rathousky	KTM			Ret	34	DNQ	DNQ			25	28	DNQ	DNQ			0
	(Italy) Rossi	KTM	25	29	31	30	DNQ	DNQ	DNQ	DNQ							0
	(France) Krajewski	KTM	DNQ	DNQ	DNQ	DNQ			25	Ret	DNQ	DNQ					0
	(United Kingdom) Nunn	Yamaha	Ret	Ret	26	26	DNQ	DNQ	DNQ	DNQ							0
	(Belgium) Lagrou	KTM	DNQ	DNQ							Ret	29	32	26			0
	(Netherlands) Walvoort	KTM	DNQ	DNQ	DNQ	DNQ	DNQ	DNQ	DNQ	DNQ	DNQ	DNQ	28	31	37	31	0
	(Sweden) Semb	Husqvarna	DNQ	DNQ	28	39	DNQ	DNQ					DNQ	DNQ			0
	(Spain) Tomas	Yamaha			DNQ	DNQ	33	29	30	29	DNQ	DNQ	DNQ	DNQ			0
	(Italy) Gimm	Yamaha			30	38	32	32					Ret	36			0
	(Germany) Trache	Yamaha	DNQ	DNQ	DNQ	DNQ	DNQ	DNQ	DNQ	DNQ	DNQ	DNQ	DNQ	DNQ	34	30	0
	(Belgium) Heirwegh	KTM					DNQ	DNQ	DNQ	DNQ	DNQ	DNQ	33	Ret	35	33	0
	(France) Casat	Husqvarna							34	33							0
	(Italy) D'Aniello	Yamaha			33	37	DNQ	DNQ									0
	(Switzerland) Diserens	Yamaha	DNQ	DNQ	34	35					DNQ	DNQ					0
	(Norway) Rindal	Yamaha													36	Ret	0
	(Sweden) Isaksson	KTM													DNQ	36	0
	(Spain) Sanchez	Yamaha			DNQ	DNQ	DNQ	DNQ	Ret	Ret							0
	(Netherlands) Simons	KTM	DNQ	DNQ									Ret	Ret			0
	(South Africa) Durow	Husqvarna	Ret	DNS							DNQ	DNQ					0
	(Czech Republic) Wagenknecht	KTM	DNQ	Ret							DNQ	DNQ					0
	(Sweden) Hanstrom	Yamaha	DNQ	DNQ							DNQ	DNQ			DNS	DNS	0
	(Denmark) W. Kleemann	KTM	DNQ	DNQ	DNQ	DNQ	DNQ	DNQ	DNQ	DNQ	DNQ	DNQ	DNQ	DNQ	DNQ	DNQ	0
	(Denmark) V. Kleemann	KTM	DNQ	DNQ	DNQ	DNQ	DNQ	DNQ	DNQ	DNQ	DNQ	DNQ					0
	(Portugal) Gaidão	KTM	DNQ	DNQ	DNQ	DNQ	DNQ	DNQ	DNQ	DNQ			DNQ	DNQ			0
	(Sweden) Andersson	Husqvarna	DNQ	DNQ	DNQ	DNQ					DNQ	DNQ	DNQ	DNQ	DNQ	DNQ	0
	(Portugal) Marques	Husqvarna	DNQ	DNQ	DNQ	DNQ	DNQ	DNQ	DNQ	DNQ							0
	(Germany) Lohmann	Yamaha	DNQ	DNQ	DNQ	DNQ	DNQ	DNQ			DNQ	DNQ					0
	(France) Metayer	KTM	DNQ	DNQ	DNQ	DNQ			DNQ	DNQ	DNQ	DNQ					0
	(Czech Republic) Maj	Husqvarna	DNQ	DNQ	DNQ	DNQ					DNQ	DNQ	DNQ	DNQ			0
	(Italy) Sarasso	KTM	DNQ	DNQ			DNQ	DNQ	DNQ	DNQ	DNQ	DNQ					0
	(Estonia) Michelis	KTM	DNQ	DNQ							DNQ	DNQ	DNQ	DNQ	DNQ	DNQ	0
	(Netherlands) van Hout	KTM	DNQ	DNQ							DNQ	DNQ	DNQ	DNQ	DNQ	DNQ	0
	(Italy) Razzini	Yamaha					DNQ	DNQ	DNQ	DNQ	DNQ	DNQ	DNQ	DNQ			0
	(Belgium) Vander Auwera	KTM	DNQ	DNQ	DNQ	DNQ	DNQ	DNQ									0
	(Czech Republic) Pikart	KTM	DNQ	DNQ	DNQ	DNQ	DNQ	DNQ									0
	(Italy) Paglionico	Husqvarna	DNQ	DNQ	DNQ	DNQ	DNQ	DNQ									0
	(Belgium) Van de Voorde	KTM	DNQ	DNQ	DNQ	DNQ	DNQ	DNQ									0
	(Switzerland) Elsener	Yamaha	DNQ	DNQ	DNQ	DNQ					DNQ	DNQ					0
	(Italy) Maggiora	Husqvarna	DNQ	DNQ			DNQ	DNQ					DNQ	DNQ			0
	(Latvia) Pumpurs	Yamaha	DNQ	DNQ							DNQ	DNQ			DNQ	DNQ	0
	(Italy) Della Valle	KTM					DNQ	DNQ	DNQ	DNQ	DNQ	DNQ					0
	(Brazil) Bicalho	KTM	DNQ	DNQ	DNQ	DNQ											0
	(Belarus) Volovich	KTM	DNQ	DNQ	DNQ	DNQ											0
	(Netherlands) Nieuwenhuizen	KTM	DNQ	DNQ	DNQ	DNQ											0
	(Spain) Rosell	Yamaha	DNQ	DNQ	DNQ	DNQ											0
	(Italy) Ruffini	Yamaha	DNQ	DNQ			DNQ	DNQ									0
	(Germany) König	KTM	DNQ	DNQ							DNQ	DNQ					0
	(Netherlands) de Lange	Yamaha	DNQ	DNQ							DNQ	DNQ					0
	(Belgium) Daniëls	KTM	DNQ	DNQ									DNQ	DNQ			0
	(Netherlands) Van der Veen	Husqvarna	DNQ	DNQ									DNQ	DNQ			0
	(Russia) Zhilkin	KTM	DNQ	DNQ									DNQ	DNQ			0
	(Netherlands) van de Bunte	KTM	DNQ	DNQ									DNQ	DNQ			0
	(Italy) Viano	KTM			DNQ	DNQ	DNQ	DNQ									0
	(Italy) Cristofori	Husqvarna			DNQ	DNQ	DNQ	DNQ									0
	(Italy) Auer	Husqvarna			DNQ	DNQ	DNQ	DNQ									0
	(Italy) Bosi	Yamaha			DNQ	DNQ	DNQ	DNQ									0
	(Germany) Massury	KTM			DNQ	DNQ					DNQ	DNQ					0
	(Austria) Dieminger	KTM			DNQ	DNQ					DNQ	DNQ					0
	(Sweden) Boberg	KTM							DNQ	DNQ					DNQ	DNQ	0
	(United Kingdom) Bracegirdle	KTM									DNQ	DNQ	DNQ	DNQ			0
	(Sweden) Moen	Husqvarna									DNQ	DNQ			DNQ	DNQ	0
	(Sweden) Högberg	Yamaha	DNQ	DNQ													0
	(Netherlands) Aspers	Husqvarna	DNQ	DNQ													0
	(Netherlands) Valk	Yamaha	DNQ	DNQ													0
	(France) Levy	KTM	DNQ	DNQ													0
	(Italy) Mazzantini	KTM			DNQ	DNQ											0
	(Sweden) Persson	KTM			DNQ	DNQ											0
	(Italy) Ladini	KTM			DNQ	DNQ											0
	(Italy) Cassibba	Husqvarna			DNQ	DNQ											0
	(Russia) Frolov	KTM			DNQ	DNQ											0
	(Croatia) Piskor	Yamaha			DNQ	DNQ											0
	(Italy) Arangio Febbo	Husqvarna			DNQ	DNQ											0
	(Italy) Cineroli	KTM					DNQ	DNQ									0
	(United States) Reyes Jr.	Husqvarna							DNQ	DNQ							0
	(France) Madoulaud	Husqvarna							DNQ	DNQ							0
	(Czech Republic) Vasicek	Husqvarna									DNQ	DNQ					0
	(Germany) Fiedler	Husqvarna									DNQ	DNQ					0
	(Belgium) Moens	KTM											DNQ	DNQ			0
	(Spain) Fontova	KTM											DNQ	DNQ			0
	(Netherlands) Tuininga	KTM											DNQ	DNQ			0
	(Netherlands) Bankers	Yamaha											DNQ	DNQ			0
	(Belgium) Bal	KTM											DNQ	DNQ			0
	(Netherlands) Rutten	KTM											DNQ	DNQ			0
	(Sweden) Lövgren	KTM													DNQ	DNQ	0
	(Denmark) Jensen	KTM													DNQ	DNQ	0
Pos	Rider	Bike	NED (Netherlands)		TRE (Italy)		ITA (Italy)		FRA (France)		GER (Germany)		BEL (Belgium)		SWE (Sweden)		Points

=== Manufacturers Championship ===
Pos	Bike	NED (Netherlands)		TRE (Italy)		ITA (Italy)		FRA (France)		GER (Germany)		BEL (Belgium)		SWE (Sweden)		Points
1	KTM	3	1	2	2	2	2	1	1	2	1	2	1	1	1	327
2	Husqvarna	1	2	1	1	1	1	3	2	1	4	1	2	3	3	319
3	Yamaha	10	18	13	17	17	17	8	27	5	8	13	13	14	14	106
Pos	Bike	NED (Netherlands)		TRE (Italy)		ITA (Italy)		FRA (France)		GER (Germany)		BEL (Belgium)		SWE (Sweden)		Points

== EMX2T ==
A 7-round calendar for the 2019 season was announced on 25 October 2018. EMX2T is for riders competing on 2-stroke motorcycles of 250cc.

=== EMX2T ===
Round	Date	Grand Prix	Location	Race 1 Winner	Race 2 Winner	Round Winner	Report
1	24 March	Great Britain	Matterley Basin	(United Kingdom) Brad Anderson	(United Kingdom) Brad Anderson	(United Kingdom) Brad Anderson	Report
2	12 May	Italy	Mantova	(Netherlands) Mike Kras	(United Kingdom) Brad Anderson	(Netherlands) Mike Kras	Report
3	19 May	Portugal	Agueda	(Netherlands) Mike Kras	(Netherlands) Mike Kras	(Netherlands) Mike Kras	Report
4	9 June	Russia	Orlyonok	(United Kingdom) Todd Kellett	(United Kingdom) Brad Anderson	(United Kingdom) Todd Kellett	Report
5	16 June	Latvia	Kegums	(Sweden) Ken Bengtson	(Sweden) Ken Bengtson	(Sweden) Ken Bengtson	Report
6	18 August	Italy	Imola	(Italy) Manuel Iacopi	(Italy) Manuel Iacopi	(Italy) Manuel Iacopi	Report
7	8 September	Turkey	Afyonkarahisar	(Italy) Manuel Iacopi	(Netherlands) Mike Kras	(Netherlands) Mike Kras	Report

=== Entry list ===
Team	Constructor	No	Rider	Rounds
Verde Substance KTM	KTM	1	(United Kingdom) Brad Anderson	All
Torino Moto	Husqvarna	3	(Italy) Corrado Romaniello	6
Torino Moto	Husqvarna	234	(Italy) Andrea Giglio	6
EL4 Racing	KTM	4	(Netherlands) Eric Leijtens	2
ESP MX Racing Team	Husqvarna	7	(Germany) Maximilian Spies	2–3, 6
	Husqvarna	8	(Italy) Manolo Guarise	2
	Honda	10	(United Kingdom) James Rutter	1
G&JP Fountain Builders	Yamaha	11	(United Kingdom) Ben Putnam	1–3, 6
Motorshop Desmet	KTM	12	(Belgium) Gordano Natale	
	KTM	13	(United Kingdom) Henry Siddiqui	1
Team Maddii Racing Husqvarna	Husqvarna	14	(Italy) Pietro Salina	1–3, 5–6
Team Maddii Racing Husqvarna	Husqvarna	270	(Italy) Eugenio Barbaglia	6
	Husqvarna	15	(United Kingdom) Bradley Wheeler	1
Ceres 71 Racing	Yamaha	21	(Italy) Marco Lolli	1–3, 5–6
Apico Husqvarna	Husqvarna	25	(United Kingdom) Jamie Law	1
Apico Husqvarna	Husqvarna	110	(United Kingdom) Matt Burrows	1
Team Lakerveld Racing	KTM	26	(Netherlands) Nick Leerkes	5–6
Team Lakerveld Racing	Yamaha	89	(Netherlands) Rico Lommers	
Team Lakerveld Racing	Yamaha	822	(Netherlands) Mike Bolink	1
Galvin MX Team	KTM	24	(Netherlands) Jordy van Orsouw	5
Galvin MX Team	KTM	188	(Netherlands) Joshua van der Linden	5
Galvin MX Team	KTM	228	(Netherlands) Kay Ebben	5
Galvin MX Team	KTM	289	(Netherlands) Maikel Van Balen	5
	Yamaha	31	(Spain) Alexander Olaeta	1
Hofstede MX Team	Husqvarna	38	(Netherlands) Karl Timmerman	6
	Honda	42	(Russia) Iurii Lukash	4
Cheddar MX Store	KTM	54	(United Kingdom) Corey Hockey	1
Team Ecomaxx Fuels	KTM	55	(Netherlands) Mike Kras	All
Team Ecomaxx Fuels	KTM	92	(Netherlands) Youri van t'Ende	1–3
A1M Husqvarna	Husqvarna	62	(Estonia) Andero Lusbo	1–6
Hitachi KTM fuelled by Milwaukee	KTM	63	(United Kingdom) Oliver Benton	1
Caparvi Racing Team	Yamaha	73	(Italy) Pier Filippo Bertuzzo	2–6
Caparvi Racing Team	Yamaha	218	(Italy) Gianfranco Mattara	
TM UK Malcolm Rathmell Sport	TM	74	(United Kingdom) Troy Willerton	1
CEC Husqvarna Scandinavia	Husqvarna	80	(Sweden) Ken Bengtson	5
SHR Motorsports	KTM	82	(Germany) Dennis Fahr	1
Team Ausio Yamaha	Yamaha	84	(Spain) Eric Tomas	3
Brunetti Motors	KTM	86	(Italy) Matteo Del Coco	1–3, 5–6
RFX KTM Racing	KTM	91	(United Kingdom) Charlie Putnam	1–5
Team Poláš	KTM	97	(Slovakia) Denis Poláš	2
Ride and Race Husqvarna	Husqvarna	98	(Belgium) Erik Willems	2
HT Group Racing Team	Gas Gas	101	(Czech Republic) Vaclav Kovar	1–6
	Yamaha	102	(Greece) Andreas Andreous	7
	Yamaha	103	(Belgium) Tanguy Gabriel	6
Team 505 Racing	KTM	109	(Italy) Riccardo Cencioni	1–3, 6
Team 505 Racing	KTM	939	(Italy) Michele Cencioni	1–3, 6
	KTM	118	(United Kingdom) Jaydon Murphy	1
Kros Team Gaerne	Husqvarna	122	(Italy) Marco Paganini	2
	KTM	129	(Switzerland) Steve Gailland	1, 6
365 Racing Team	KTM	131	(Spain) Joel Anton	
Ghidinelli Racing Team	Yamaha	132	(Spain) Mahy Villanueva	2
3MX Team	TM	135	(Italy) Alessandro Lentini	6
Team HTS KTM	KTM	141	(Hungary) Erik Hugyecz	2
E2T Racing Team	Husqvarna	172	(United Kingdom) Robert Holyoake	1–5
	Yamaha	181	(Greece) Dimitrios Baxevanis	7
A-Team Neustrelitz	KTM	244	(Germany) Max Bülow	2, 4–5
	Husqvarna	258	(Sweden) Kevin Davidsson	1
Team Fashionbike	Husqvarna	263	(Italy) Alfredo Memoli	6
Nobis MX Team	KTM	303	(Netherlands) Krijn van Vroenhoven	2
KRTZ	KTM	311	(Czech Republic) Marek Nespor	1
KTM Zauner Racing	KTM	319	(Austria) Christoph Zeintl	2
KTM Zauner Racing	KTM	347	(Austria) Johannes Klein	2
MC Sport Racing Team	Husqvarna	351	(Sweden) Jeff Oxelmark	5
JTX Racing Team	KTM	365	(Denmark) Nikolaj Skovgaard	1–3, 6
I-Fly JK Racing Yamaha	Yamaha	371	(Italy) Manuel Iacopi	6–7
Piazza Race Team	KTM	380	(Italy) Massimiliano Piazza	2, 6
	KTM	383	(Slovakia) Peter Hudak	1–2
	Yamaha	385	(Italy) Sebastian Zenato	1–3, 5–6
Team WPM Motors	KTM	419	(Netherlands) Jan Spliethof	5
Team BBR Offroad	Husqvarna	499	(Italy) Emanuele Alberio	1–3, 6
	Husqvarna	517	(Italy) Pablo Caspani	2, 5
	KTM	531	(Italy) Francesco Galligari	4, 7
	KTM	532	(Netherlands) Mikey Adams	1
	Husqvarna	538	(Italy) Roberto Ciannavei	2, 6
Motor2000 KTM Racing Team	KTM	601	(United Kingdom) Kelton Gwyther	1
Gabriel Insulation Seal Moto	Yamaha	714	(United Kingdom) Brad Todd	1–3
	KTM	715	(Netherlands) Jaap Janssen	5–6
MR Team	Yamaha	725	(San Marino) Andrea Gorini	1–3, 5–6
	Yamaha	731	(Italy) Andrea Vendruscolo	1–3, 5
Team SGRC	Husqvarna	758	(France) Raffael Blond	
F4E Racing KTM	KTM	844	(Belgium) Damon Goyvaerts	
Team Deghi	KTM	888	(Italy) Gianluca Deghi	1–2, 5–6
	Yamaha	919	(Sweden) Christian Simonsson	5
MGR Motocross Team	KTM	938	(Brazil) Rodolfo Bicalho	6
MGR Motocross Team	KTM	974	(Italy) Mario Tamai	2, 5–6
	Husqvarna	991	(Switzerland) Sven Burch	2
St Blazey MX	Yamaha	998	(United Kingdom) Todd Kellett	1–6

=== Riders Championship ===
Pos	Rider	Bike	GBR (United Kingdom)		ITA (Italy)		POR (Portugal)		RUS (Russia)		LAT (Latvia)		ITA (Italy)		TUR (Turkey)		Points
1	(Netherlands) Kras	KTM	2	Ret	1	2	1	1	4	4	2	2	3	5	3	1	280
2	(United Kingdom) Anderson	KTM	1	1	13	1	8	2	3	1	5	4	5	2	2	2	279
3	(United Kingdom) Kellett	Yamaha	4	6	2	18	2	6	1	2	3	5	4	17			200
4	(Czech Republic) Kovar	Gas Gas	3	2	12	5	4	5	11	5	7	9	8	7			180
5	(Estonia) Lusbo	Husqvarna	5	7	5	Ret	5	3	2	3	4	3	DNS	DNS			162
6	(San Marino) Gorini	Yamaha	6	4	21	12	14	11			12	17	6	6			102
7	(Italy) Deghi	KTM	14	12	14	Ret					8	6	2	3			93
8	(Italy) Iacopi	Yamaha											1	1	1	6	90
9	(Netherlands) van t'Ende	KTM	12	10	6	6	3	4									88
10	(United Kingdom) Todd	Yamaha	22	3	3	4	6	8									86
11	(Italy) Bertuzzo	Yamaha			7	Ret	10	7	5	6	Ret	19	Ret	9			84
12	(Italy) Vendruscolo	Yamaha	10	17	11	11	9	9			10	12					79
13	(Italy) Alberio	Husqvarna	8	13	Ret	7	7	Ret					7	10			74
14	(Italy) Tamai	KTM			4	13					6	7	27	4			73
15	(Italy) Lolli	Yamaha	9	9	17	10	15	Ret			20	15	11	20			63
16	(United Kingdom) B. Putnam	Yamaha	11	5	8	Ret	11	10					Ret	19			62
17	(Italy) Del Coco	KTM	17	20	16	29	18	15			14	14	9	8			58
18	(Italy) Galligari	Husqvarna							10	11					6	5	52
19	(Sweden) Bengtson	Husqvarna									1	1					50
20	(United Kingdom) C. Putnam	KTM	19	14	23	24	16	19	6	7	18	20					49
21	(Germany) Spies	Husqvarna			18	16	12	13					10	12			45
22	(United Kingdom) Holyoake	Husqvarna	Ret	11	27	Ret	Ret	18	7	9	Ret	Ret					39
23	(Italy) Zenato	Yamaha	20	Ret	25	14	19	17			16	16	12	16			38
24	(Greece) Baxevanis	Yamaha													5	3	36
25	(Greece) Andreou	Yamaha													4	4	36
26	(Netherlands) Leerkes	KTM									11	8	16	14			35
27	(Denmark) Skovgaard	KTM	18	26	20	17	13	12					21	18			28
28	(Belgium) Willems	Husqvarna			15	3											26
29	(Germany) Bülow	KTM			29	21			8	8	Ret	22					26
30	(Austria) Klein	KTM			9	8											25
31	(Russia) Lukash	Honda							9	10							23
32	(United Kingdom) Burrows	Husqvarna	13	8													21
33	(Netherlands) Ebben	KTM									9	13					20
34	(Sweden) Oxelmark	Husqvarna									13	11					18
35	(Italy) M. Cencioni	KTM	16	23	22	Ret	17	16					17	Ret			18
36	(Netherlands) van der Linden	KTM									15	10					17
37	(Italy) Memoli	Husqvarna											15	11			16
38	(Italy) Barbaglia	Husqvarna											14	13			15
39	(United Kingdom) Law	Husqvarna	7	Ret													14
40	(Italy) Paganini	Husqvarna			Ret	9											12
41	(United Kingdom) Hockey	KTM	15	15													12
42	(Hungary) Hugyecz	KTM			10	Ret											11
43	(Italy) R. Cencioni	KTM	28	29	Ret	19	21	20					13	22			11
44	(Spain) Tomas	Yamaha					20	14									8
45	(Slovakia) Polas	KTM			19	15											8
46	(Italy) Lentini	TM											20	15			7
47	(Netherlands) Bolink	KTM	23	16													5
48	(Netherlands) Spliethof	KTM									19	18					5
49	(Netherlands) Janssen	KTM									17	Ret	22	Ret			4
50	(Brazil) Bicalho	KTM											18	21			3
51	(Czech Republic) Nespor	KTM	29	18													3
52	(United Kingdom) Wheeler	Husqvarna	21	19													2
53	(Belgium) Gabriel	Yamaha											19	Ret			2
54	(Italy) Guarise	Husqvarna			24	20											1
	(Italy) Salina	Husqvarna	30	25	26	22	22	21			DNS	DNS	24	23			0
	(Netherlands) van Orsouw	KTM									22	21					0
	(Italy) Caspani	Husqvarna			Ret	25					21	24					0
	(United Kingdom) Rutter	Honda	27	21													0
	(Slovakia) Hudak	KTM	24	22	DNS	DNS											0
	(Netherlands) Van Balen	KTM									23	23					0
	(Netherlands) Timmerman	Husqvarna											23	24			0
	(Austria) Zeintl	KTM			28	23											0
	(United Kingdom) Benton	KTM	25	24													0
	(Sweden) Simonsson	Yamaha									24	Ret					0
	(Italy) Ciannavei	Husqvarna			31	27							26	25			0
	(Italy) Piazza	KTM			30	30							25	26			0
	(Switzerland) Gailland	KTM	26	28									Ret	DNS			0
	(Switzerland) Burch	Husqvarna			Ret	26											0
	(United Kingdom) Gwyther	KTM	33	27													0
	(Spain) Villanueva	Yamaha			Ret	28											0
	(Italy) Giglio	Husqvarna											28	Ret			0
	(Germany) Fahr	KTM	34	30													0
	(Netherlands) van Vroenhoven	KTM			32	31											0
	(United Kingdom) Siddiqui	KTM	31	Ret													0
	(United Kingdom) Murphy	KTM	32	Ret													0
	(Netherlands) Leijtens	KTM			Ret	Ret											0
	(Netherlands) Adams	KTM	Ret	DNS													0
	(United Kingdom) Willerton	TM	Ret	DNS													0
	(Sweden) Davidsson	Husqvarna	Ret	DNS													0
	(Italy) Romaniello	Husqvarna											Ret	DNS			0
	(Spain) Olaeta	Yamaha	DNS	DNS													0
Pos	Rider	Bike	GBR (United Kingdom)		ITA (Italy)		POR (Portugal)		RUS (Russia)		LAT (Latvia)		ITA (Italy)		TUR (Turkey)		Points

=== Manufacturers Championship ===
Pos	Bike	GBR (United Kingdom)		ITA (Italy)		POR (Portugal)		RUS (Russia)		LAT (Latvia)		ITA (Italy)		TUR (Turkey)		Points
1	KTM	1	1	1	1	2	1	3	1	2	2	2	2	2	1	330
2	Yamaha	4	3	2	4	2	6	1	2	3	5	1	1	1	3	293
3	Husqvarna	5	7	5	3	5	3	2	3	1	1	7	10	6	5	250
4	Gas Gas	3	2	12	5	4	5	11	5	7	9	8	7			180
5	Honda	27	21					9	10							23
6	TM	Ret	DNS									20	15			7
Pos	Bike	GBR (United Kingdom)		ITA (Italy)		POR (Portugal)		RUS (Russia)		LAT (Latvia)		ITA (Italy)		TUR (Turkey)		Points

== EMX85 ==
A 1-round calendar for the 2019 season was announced on 25 October 2018. EMX85 is for riders competing on 2-stroke motorcycles of 85cc.

=== EMX85 ===
Round	Date	Grand Prix	Location	Race 1 Winner	Race 2 Winner	Round Winner	Report
1	28 August	Czech Republic	Loket	(Latvia) Edvards Bidzāns	(Italy) Valerio Lata	(Latvia) Edvards Bidzāns	Report

=== Participants ===
Riders qualify for the championship by finishing in the top 10 in one of the 4 regional 85cc championships.

No	Rider	Motorcycle
9	(Croatia) Luka Kunic	Yamaha
40	(Hungary) Laszlo Tecsi	KTM
51	(Croatia) Dino Loncar	Yamaha
73	(Croatia) Enola Samu	Yamaha
111	(Croatia) Mia Ribic	KTM
251	(Italy) Simone Pavan	KTM
294	(Italy) Valerio Lata	KTM
299	(France) David Guillemot	KTM
305	(Spain) Antonio Gallego	KTM
310	(Spain) Victor Puig	KTM
319	(France) Quentin Prugnieres	KTM
321	(Slovenia) Jaka Peklaj	Husqvarna
359	(France) Maxime Grau	KTM
373	(Spain) Edgar Canet	KTM
396	(Italy) Feruccio Zanchi	Husqvarna
398	(Italy) Matteo Russi	KTM
405	(Denmark) Lucas Bruhn	KTM
419	(Belgium) Sacha Coenen	Yamaha
424	(United Kingdom) Charlie Heyman	Husqvarna
432	(Netherlands) Ivano Van Erp	Yamaha
451	(Czech Republic) Julius Mikula	KTM
456	(United Kingdom) Ollie Colmer	Husqvarna
515	(Denmark) Mads Fredsoe	KTM
527	(Denmark) Andreas Jensen	KTM
560	(Sweden) Liam Akerlund	KTM
566	(Sweden) Laban Alm	Husqvarna
572	(Netherlands) Cas Valk	Husqvarna
593	(Belgium) Lucas Coenen	Yamaha
654	(Estonia) Mikk Martin Lohmus	KTM
684	(Latvia) Uldis Freibergs	Husqvarna
691	(Latvia) Martins Platkēvičs	KTM
710	(Estonia) Richard Paat	KTM
711	(Latvia) Kirils Maslovs	Husqvarna
716	(Hungary) Noel Zanocz	Husqvarna
743	(Latvia) Roberts Lūsis	KTM
755	(Latvia) Kristers Janbergs	Husqvarna
765	(Latvia) Edvards Bidzāns	Husqvarna
772	(Latvia) Kārlis Reišulis	KTM
774	(Belarus) Aleh Makhnou	KTM
784	(Russia) Eldar Mukimkhanov	KTM

=== Riders Championship ===
Pos	Rider	Motorcycle	CZE (Czech Republic)		Points
1	(Latvia) Edvards Bidzāns	Husqvarna	1	2	47
2	(Italy) Valerio Lata	KTM	3	1	45
3	(France) Quentin Prugnieres	KTM	2	3	42
4	(Latvia) Kārlis Reišulis	KTM	4	4	36
5	(France) Maxime Grau	KTM	5	5	32
6	(United Kingdom) Charlie Heyman	Husqvarna	7	10	25
7	(Netherlands) Cas Valk	Husqvarna	11	9	22
8	(Hungary) Laszlo Tecsi	KTM	16	6	20
9	(Denmark) Mads Fredsoe	KTM	6	17	19
10	(Czech Republic) Julius Mikula	KTM	9	15	18
11	(Sweden) Laban Alm	Husqvarna	17	8	17
12	(Spain) Victor Puig	KTM	15	11	16
13	(Spain) Edgar Canet	KTM	14	12	16
14	(Denmark) Lucas Bruhn	KTM	10	16	16
15	(Italy) Matteo Russi	KTM	Ret	7	14
16	(Italy) Ferruccio Zanchi	Husqvarna	8	21	13
17	(Spain) Antonio Gallego	KTM	13	18	11
18	(Belgium) Sacha Coenen	Yamaha	12	19	11
19	(France) David Guillemot	KTM	19	13	10
20	(Belgium) Lucas Coenen	Yamaha	21	14	7
21	(Latvia) Kirils Maslovs	Husqvarna	18	27	3
22	(Latvia) Roberts Lūsis	KTM	27	20	1
23	(United Kingdom) Ollie Colmer	Husqvarna	20	22	1
	(Latvia) Martins Platkēvičs	KTM	22	30	0
	(Estonia) Mikk Martin Lohmus	KTM	23	26	0
	(Slovenia) Jaka Peklaj	Husqvarna	37	23	0
	(Hungary) Noel Zanocz	Husqvarna	24	25	0
	(Sweden) Liam Akerlund	KTM	33	24	0
	(Latvia) Uldis Freibergs	Husqvarna	25	Ret	0
	(Netherlands) Ivano Van Erp	Yamaha	26	Ret	0
	(Croatia) Luka Kunic	Yamaha	31	28	0
	(Denmark) Andreas Jensen	KTM	28	Ret	0
	(Belarus) Aleh Makhnou	KTM	32	29	0
	(Latvia) Kristers Janbergs	Husqvarna	29	Ret	0
	(Russia) Eldar Mukimkhanov	KTM	30	31	0
	(Estonia) Richard Paat	KTM	34	32	0
	(Croatia) Enola Samu	Yamaha	38	33	0
	(Croatia) Mia Ribic	KTM	35	Ret	0
	(Croatia) Dino Loncar	Yamaha	36	Ret	0
	(Italy) Simone Pavan	KTM	Ret	DNS	0
Pos	Rider	Motorcycle	CZE (Czech Republic)		Points

== EMX65 ==
A 1-round calendar for the 2019 season was announced on 25 October 2018. EMX65 is for riders competing on 2-stroke motorcycles of 65cc.

=== EMX65 ===
Round	Date	Grand Prix	Location	Race 1 Winner	Race 2 Winner	Round Winner	Report
1	28 August	Czech Republic	Loket	(Czech Republic) Vitezslav Marek	(Czech Republic) Vitezslav Marek	(Czech Republic) Vitezslav Marek	Report

=== Participants ===
Riders qualify for the championship by finishing in the top 10 in one of the 4 regional 65cc championships.

No	Rider	Motorcycle
8	(Bulgaria) Vencislav Toshev	KTM
26	(Hungary) Adam Horvath	KTM
27	(Israel) Ofir Tzemach	Husqvarna
88	(Hungary) Ferenc Orlov	Husqvarna
96	(Bulgaria) Dani Tsankov	Yamaha
202	(Switzerland) Ryan Oppliger	KTM
211	(Italy) Samuele Mecchi	Husqvarna
221	(Italy) Filippo Mantovani	KTM
249	(Croatia) Simun Ivandic	Yamaha
256	(France) Basile Pigois	Husqvarna
258	(Italy) Edoardo Martinelli	Husqvarna
259	(France) Felix Cardineau	Husqvarna
266	(Czech Republic) Vaclav Janout	KTM
286	(Spain) Joel Canadas	KTM
299	(France) Cayenne Danion	Husqvarna
295	(France) Mano Faure	Husqvarna
300	(Spain) Salvador Perez	Yamaha
317	(Italy) Niccolo Mannini	Yamaha
401	(Netherlands) Lotte Van Drunen	KTM
411	(Netherlands) Dex van den Broek	KTM
417	(Netherlands) Jayson Van Drunen	Yamaha
479	(Czech Republic) Vitezslav Marek	KTM
484	(Netherlands) Dex Kooiker	Yamaha
488	(Germany) Aaron Kowatsch	Yamaha
522	(United Kingdom) Ashton Boughen	Husqvarna
527	(Netherlands) Mick Kennedy	Yamaha
529	(Belgium) Maxime Lucas	KTM
545	(Sweden) Anton Isaksson	Husqvarna
551	(Netherlands) Mike Visser	Husqvarna
574	(Netherlands) Gyan Doensen	KTM
589	(Belgium) Tyla Van de Poel	KTM
621	(Poland) Piotr Kajrys	KTM
701	(Lithuania) Marius Adomaitis	KTM
719	(Latvia) Raivo Laicāns	Husqvarna
738	(Poland) Bartosz Jaworski	KTM
747	(Russia) Semen Rybakov	KTM
749	(Russia) Ivan Dubatovkin	Husqvarna
751	(Poland) Dawid Zaremba	KTM
793	(Estonia) Gregor Kuusk	Husqvarna

=== Riders Championship ===
Pos	Rider	Motorcycle	CZE (Czech Republic)		Points
1	(Czech Republic) Vitezslav Marek	KTM	1	1	50
2	(Lithuania) Marius Adomaitis	KTM	2	3	42
3	(Russia) Semen Rybakov	KTM	3	4	38
4	(Sweden) Anton Isaksson	Husqvarna	4	7	32
5	(Italy) Filippo Mantovani	KTM	7	9	26
6	(Netherlands) Lotte Van Drunen	KTM	13	5	24
7	(Italy) Edoardo Martinelli	Husqvarna	37	2	22
8	(France) Felix Cardineau	Husqvarna	14	6	22
9	(Netherlands) Gyan Doensen	KTM	10	10	22
10	(Spain) Joel Canadas	KTM	5	16	21
11	(Netherlands) Jayson Van Drunen	Yamaha	12	12	18
12	(Netherlands) Mick Kennedy	Yamaha	6	36	15
13	(Estonia) Gregor Kuusk	Husqvarna	25	8	13
14	(Hungary) Adam Horvath	KTM	16	13	13
15	(Belgium) Maxime Lucas	KTM	8	28	13
16	(Netherlands) Dex Kooiker	Yamaha	15	15	12
17	(France) Mano Faure	Husqvarna	11	19	12
18	(Russia) Ivan Dubatovkin	Husqvarna	9	23	12
19	(United Kingdom) Ashton Boughen	Husqvarna	33	11	10
20	(Germany) Aaron Kowatsch	Yamaha	17	17	8
21	(France) Cayenne Danion	Husqvarna	24	14	7
22	(Poland) Dawid Zaremba	KTM	23	18	3
23	(Belgium) Tyla Van de Poel	KTM	18	21	3
24	(Czech Republic) Vaclav Janout	KTM	19	26	2
25	(Italy) Niccolo Mannini	Yamaha	38	20	1
26	(Croatia) Simun Ivandic	Yamaha	20	22	1
	(Israel) Ofir Tzemach	Husqvarna	21	31	0
	(Poland) Piotr Kajrys	KTM	22	30	0
	(Hungary) Ferenc Orlov	Husqvarna	29	24	0
	(Poland) Bartosz Jaworski	KTM	27	25	0
	(Latvia) Raivo Laicāns	Husqvarna	26	32	0
	(Spain) Salvador Perez	Yamaha	31	27	0
	(France) Basile Pigois	Husqvarna	28	34	0
	(Switzerland) Ryan Oppliger	KTM	32	29	0
	(Italy) Samuele Mecchi	Husqvarna	30	33	0
	(Bulgaria) Vencislav Toshev	KTM	34	37	0
	(Bulgaria) Dani Tsankov	Yamaha	35	35	0
	(Netherlands) Dex van den Broek	KTM	36	38	0
	(Netherlands) Mike Visser	Husqvarna	39	39	0
Pos	Rider	Motorcycle	CZE (Czech Republic)		Points
