= Edvards Bidzāns =

Latvian motorcycle racer

- Nationality: Latvian
- Born: 7 June 2005 (age 21) Riga, Latvia

Motocross career
- Years active: 2015 - present
- Teams: Husqvarna

Edvards Bidzāns (born 7 June 2005) is a Latvian professional motocross rider who is a two-time European champion.

Bidzāns competes with #57. In 2021, he competed in the EMX250 class of the European championship.

== Achievements ==
Year	Championship	Bike	Class	Rank	Notes
2015	European Championship	Husqvarna	EMX 65	14th	
2016	European Championship	Husqvarna	EMX 65	1st	
2016	World Junior Championship	Husqvarna	65cc	4th	
2017	World Junior Championship	Husqvarna	85cc	38th	
2018	European Championship	Husqvarna	EMX 85	9th	
2019	European Championship	Husqvarna	EMX 85	1st	
2019	World Junior Championship	Husqvarna	85cc	2nd	
