= Brad Anderson (motocross rider) =

British motorcycle racer

Brad Andenson
- Nationality: British
- Born: 6 May 1981 (age 45) United Kingdom

Motocross career
- Years active: 2004 - present
- Teams: KTM

Brad Anderson (born 6 May 1981) is a British professional motocross rider three time European champion. He competes with No. 60.

== Achievements ==
Year	Championship	Bike	Class	Rank	Notes
2017	European Championship	KTM	EMX 300	1st	
2018	European Championship	KTM	EMX 300	1st	
2020	European Championship	KTM	EMX 2T	1st	
