= European Motocross Championship =

Motorcycle racing series

- Category: Motocross
- Region: European

European Motocross Championship is the European championship of motocross racing, organized by the FIM Europe, from 1988.

== Categories ==
Since 2014 the 65cc, 85cc, 125cc, 150cc, 250cc, 300cc and Open classes have taken on the names EMX 65, EMX 85, EMX 125, EMX 250, EMX 300 and EMX Open.

== Winners ==
Update to end of the 2020 season.

Rider who became World Champion

Year	65cc	85cc	125cc	150cc	250cc	300cc	Open
1988			(Italy) Annunzio Fanton				
1989			(France) Thierry Bethys				
1990			(Italy) Cristian Rostagno				
1991			(Italy) Alessio Chiodi				
1992			(Italy) Massimo Beltrami				
1993			(Denmark) Mikkel Caprani		(Sweden) Joakim Eliasson		
1994			(Denmark) Brian Jorgensen		(Sweden) Andreas Dygd		
1995			(Netherlands) Marco Stallman		(Sweden) Mats Nilsson		
1996			(Italy) Thomas Traversini		(Spain) Javier Garcia Vico		
1997			(Italy) Fabrizio Dini		(Spain) Javier Remacho		
1998		(France) Nicolas Delepierre	(France) Steve Boniface				(Denmark) Jesper Kjær Jørgensen
1999		(Estonia) Tanel Leok	(Spain) Antonio Paricio				(Croatia) Nenad Šipek
2000		(France) Jeremy Tarroux	(Finland) Antti Pyrhonen				(Latvia) Lauris Freibergs
2001		(France) Jeremy Tarroux	(Belgium) Kevin Strijbos				(Austria) Michael Milanovic
2002		(Belgium) Dennis Verbruggen	(Italy) Luca Cherubini				(Slovenia) Sašo Kragelj
2003		(France) Christophe Pourcel	(France) Sébastien Pourcel				(Belgium) Christophe Godrie
2004		(France) Marvin Musquin	(Finland) Matti Seistola				(Russia) Andrey Safronov
2005	(Italy) Nicola Recchia	(Italy) Mauro Fiorgentili	(France) Jérémy Tarroux				(Ukraine) Roman Morozov
2006	(Czech Republic) Vaclav Kovar	(Italy) Alessandro Lupino	(Belgium) Dennis Verbruggen				(Italy) Matteo Dottori
2007	(Slovenia) Tim Gajser	(France) Jason Clermont	(France) Gautier Paulin				(Russia) Aleksandr Tonkov
2008	(Netherlands) Davy Pootjes	(Netherlands) Jeffrey Herlings			(France) Valentin Teillet		(Czech Republic) Petr Bartos
2009	(Bulgaria) Ivan Petrov	(Slovenia) Tim Gajser	(Estonia) Priit Rätsep		(France) Christophe Charlier		(Russia) Aleksandr Tonkov
2010	(Germany) Brian Hsu	(Netherlands) Brian Bogers	(France) Jordi Tixier	(Sweden) Johan Remmelg	(France) Steven Lenoir		(Russia) Evgeny Mikhaylov
2011	(Spain) Jorge Prado	(Ukraine) Rostyslav Voytsyckyy	(Italy) Simone Zecchina		(France) Romain Febvre		(Czech Republic) Petr Bartos
2012	(Switzerland) Xylian Ramella	(Netherlands) Davy Pootjes	(Slovenia) Tim Gajser		(United Kingdom) Mel Pocock		(Belarus) Evgeni Tyletski
2013	(Netherlands) Raivo Dankers	(United Kingdom) Conrad Mewse	(Latvia) Pauls Jonass	(United Kingdom) Filippo Grigoletto	(Switzerland) Valentin Guillod		(Russia) Alexandr Burgreev
2014	(Russia) Nikita Kucherov	(Belgium) Jago Geerts	(Germany) Brian Hsu	(United Kingdom) Albie Wilkie	(United Kingdom) Steven Clarke	(Italy) Samuele Bernardini	(Russia) Semen Rogozin
2015	(Netherlands) Scott Smulders	(Netherlands) Raivo Dankers	(Spain) Jorge Prado	(Finland) Emil Weckman	(Netherlands) Nick Kouwenberg	(Italy) Marco Maddii	(Czech Republic) Martin Michek
2016	(Latvia) Edvards Bidzāns	(Austria) Rene Hofer	(Belgium) Jago Geerts	(Finland) Emil Weckman	(Denmark) Thomas Kjær Olsen	(Netherlands) Mike Kras	(Czech Republic) Martin Michek
2017	(Denmark) Mads Sorensen	cancelled	(France) Brian Moreau	(Italy) Andrea Adamo	(Italy) Morgan Lesiardo	(United Kingdom) Brad Anderson	(Ukraine) Volodymyr Tarasov
2018	(Italy) Brando Rispoli	(South Africa) Camden McLellan	(France) Thibault Benistant		(France) Mathys Boisrame	(United Kingdom) Brad Anderson	(Czech Republic) Martin Michek
2019	(Czech Republic) Vítězslav Marek	(Latvia) Edvards Bidzāns	(Italy) Mattia Guadagnini		(Netherlands) Roan van de Moosdijk	(Netherlands) Mike Kras (Note: EMX 2T)	(Czech Republic) Martin Michek
2020			(Italy) Andrea Bonacorsi		(France) Thibault Benistant	(United Kingdom) Brad Anderson	(Estonia) Karel Kutsar
2021	(Estonia) Lucas Leok	(Czech Republic) Vítězslav Marek	(Italy) Valerio Lata		(Italy) Nicholas Lapucci	(Germany) Maximilian Spies	(Italy) Davide De Bortoli
2022	(Austria) Ricardo Bauer	(Czech Republic) Vítězslav Marek	(Netherlands) Cas Valk		(Netherlands) Rick Elzinga	(Latvia) Toms Macuks	(Spain) José Butrón
2023	(Italy) Francesco Assini	(Italy) Nicolò Alvisi	(Latvia) Jānis Reišulis		(Italy) Andrea Bonacorsi	(Netherlands) Cas Valk	(France) Pierre Goupillon
2024	(Croatia) Roko Ivandić	(France) Sleny Goyer	(Hungary) Noel Zanócz		(France) Mathis Valin	(Austria) Marcel Stauffer	(Czech Republic) Jakub Terešák
2025	(France) Mathys Agullo	(France) Enzo Herzogenrath	(Italy) Nicolò Alvisi		(Latvia) Jānis Reišulis	(Czech Republic) Václav Kovář	(Belgium) Cedric Grobben
2026	(United Kingdom) Jack Waters	(Latvia) Patriks Cīrulis	(Austria) Ricardo Bauer		(Spain) Francisco García	(Czech Republic) Václav Kovář	(Finland) Jere Haavisto

Discontinued

- 2001: (France) Cyrille Coulon (125cc junior), (Czech Republic) Miroslav Kucirek (open junior)
- 2002: (Slovenia) Jaka Moze (125cc junior); (Estonia) Juss Laansoo (open junior)
- 2003: (Slovakia) Josef Kulhavy (125cc junior)
- 2004: (Latvia) Ivo Šteinbergs (125cc junior)
- 2005: (Denmark) Nicolai Hansen (125cc junior)
- 2006: (Italy) Marco Maddii (125cc junior)
- 2007: (Slovenia) Klemen Gerčar (Note: Rider who became World Champion) (125cc junior)
- 2008: (Estonia) Priit Rätsep (125cc junior)
- 2010: (France) Jordi Tixier (125cc 2 stroke)
- 2011: (Italy) Simone Zecchina (125cc 2 stroke)
- 2014: (United Kingdom) Albie Wilkie (150cc 4 stroke)
- 2019: (United Kingdom) Stephanie Laier (Women), (Norway) Martine Hughes (Women 125)

== See also ==
- FIM Europe
- Motocross World Championship
