= Luca Ruffini =

Italian footballer

Personal information
- Date of birth: 2 May 1997 (age 29)
- Place of birth: Carpenedolo, Italy
- Height: 1.75 m (5 ft 9 in)
- Position: Left-back

Team information
- Current team: Giana Erminio
- Number: 24

Youth career
- 2013–2014: Parma

Senior career*
Years	Team	Apps	(Gls)
2014–2015	Parma	0	(0)
2014–2015	→ Castiglione (loan)	32	(1)
2015–2016	Pro Piacenza	28	(1)
2016–2018	Feralpisalò	13	(0)
2017–2018	→ Rezzato (loan)	27	(0)
2018–2020	AlbinoLeffe	41	(1)
2020–2022	Desenzano	56	(5)
2022–2023	Franciacorta	19	(0)
2023–2025	Real Calepina	74	(5)
2025–	Giana Erminio	37	(2)
- * Club domestic league appearances and goals as of 30 April 2026

Luca Ruffini (born 2 May 1997) is an Italian professional footballer who plays as a defender for Serie C Group A club Giana Erminio.
