= FIM Motocross Junior World Championship =

- Category: Motocross
- Country: International
- Inaugural season: 2004
- Riders' champion: 125cc - (Austria) Ricardo Bauer; 85cc - (Australia) Blake Bohannon; 65cc - (France) Lucas Bos
- Constructors' champion: 125cc - (Austria) KTM; 85cc - (Japan) Yamaha; 65cc - (Austria) KTM

The FIM Motocross Junior World Championship is a motocross championship for younger riders, inaugurated in 1999, and is a feeder series to the FIM Motocross World Championship.

== Champions ==
Season	Location	125cc	Constructor	85cc	Constructor	65cc	Constructor
1999	(Germany) Gaildorf			(Belgium) Kevin Strijbos	(Japan) Suzuki		
2000							
2001							
2002							
2003							
2004	(Latvia) Ķegums	(Latvia) Ivo Šteinbergs	(Japan) Yamaha	(United States) Zachary Osborne	(Austria) KTM		
2005	(Czech Republic) Jinín	(Belgium) Dennis Verbruggen	(Japan) Yamaha	(United Kingdom) Steven Clarke	(Japan) Suzuki		
2006	(Finland) Vantaa	(Belgium) Joël Roelants	(Austria) KTM	(Italy) Alessandro Lupino	(Austria) KTM		
2007	(Bulgaria) Sevlievo	(United States) Blake Wharton	(Austria) KTM	(Germany) Ken Roczen	(Japan) Suzuki		
2008	(Netherlands) Heerde	(Latvia) Matīss Karro	(Japan) Suzuki	(Netherlands) Jeffrey Herlings	(Japan) Suzuki		
2009	(New Zealand) Taupō	(United States) Eli Tomac	(Japan) Honda	(Australia) Jay Wilson	(Austria) KTM		
2010	(France) Dardon-Gueugnon	(France) Jordi Tixier	(Austria) KTM	(Germany) Henry Jacobi	(Austria) KTM	(United States) Jake Pinhancos	(Austria) KTM
2011	(Italy) Cingoli	(United States) Joey Savatgy	(Japan) Suzuki	(Latvia) Pauls Jonass	(Austria) KTM	(Spain) Jorge Prado García	(Austria) KTM
2012	(Bulgaria) Sevlievo	(Slovenia) Tim Gajser	(Austria) KTM	(Taiwan) Brian Hsu	(Japan) Suzuki	(Australia) Caleb Grothues	(Austria) KTM
2013	(Czech Republic) Jinín	(Latvia) Pauls Jonass	(Austria) KTM	(United Kingdom) Conrad Mewse	(Austria) KTM	(United States) Aiden Tijero	(Austria) KTM
2014	(Belgium) Lierneux	(Germany) Brian Hsu	(Japan) Suzuki	(Finland) Kim Savaste	(Austria) KTM	(Australia) Jett Lawrence	(Austria) KTM
2015	(Spain) El Molar	(France) Maxime Renaux	(Japan) Yamaha	(Netherlands) Raivo Dankers	(Austria) KTM	(Netherlands) Kay Karssemakers	(Austria) KTM
2016	(Russia) Orlyonok	(Belgium) Jago Geerts	(Austria) KTM	(Austria) Rene Hofer	(Austria) KTM	(Russia) Kirill Vorobyev	(Austria) KTM
2017	(Estonia) Lange	(Italy) Gianluca Facchetti	(Austria) Husqvarna	(United Kingdom) Eddie Wade	(Austria) Husqvarna	(Netherlands) Ivano van Erp	(Austria) KTM
2018	(Australia) Horsham	(Australia) Bailey Malkiewicz	(Japan) Yamaha	(United States) Caden Braswell	(Austria) KTM	(Australia) Braden Plath	(Austria) Husqvarna
2019	(Italy) Pietramurata	(Italy) Mattia Guadagnini	(Austria) Husqvarna	(Italy) Valerio Lata	(Austria) KTM	(Czech Republic) Vítězslav Marek	(Austria) KTM
2021	(Greece) Megalopolis	(Norway) Håkon Østerhagen	(Italy) Fantic	(Italy) Mattia Barbieri	(Austria) Gas Gas	(Hungary) Áron Katona	(Austria) Husqvarna
2022	(Finland) Vantaa	(Netherlands) Ivano van Erp	(Japan) Yamaha	(Netherlands) Gyan Doensen	(Austria) Husqvarna	(Estonia) Lucas Leok	(Austria) Husqvarna
2023	(Romania) Bucharest	(France) Mathis Valin	(Austria) Gas Gas	(Netherlands) Dani Heitink	(Austria) Husqvarna	(Latvia) Patriks Cīrulis	(Austria) Husqvarna
2024	(Netherlands) Heerde	(Hungary) Noel Zanócz	(Italy) Fantic	(New Zealand) Levi Townley	(Japan) Yamaha	(Netherlands) Kash van Hamond	(Austria) Gas Gas
2025	(France) Romagné	(France) Mano Faure	(Japan) Yamaha	(France) Rafael Mennillo	(Austria) KTM	(United States) Kannon Zabojnik	(United States) Cobra
2026	(Czech Republic) Jinín	(Austria) Ricardo Bauer	(Austria) KTM	(Australia) Blake Bohannon	(Japan) Yamaha	(France) Lucas Bos	(Austria) KTM
2027	(Estonia) Pärnu						
