= Mattia Guadagnini =

Italian motorcycle racer

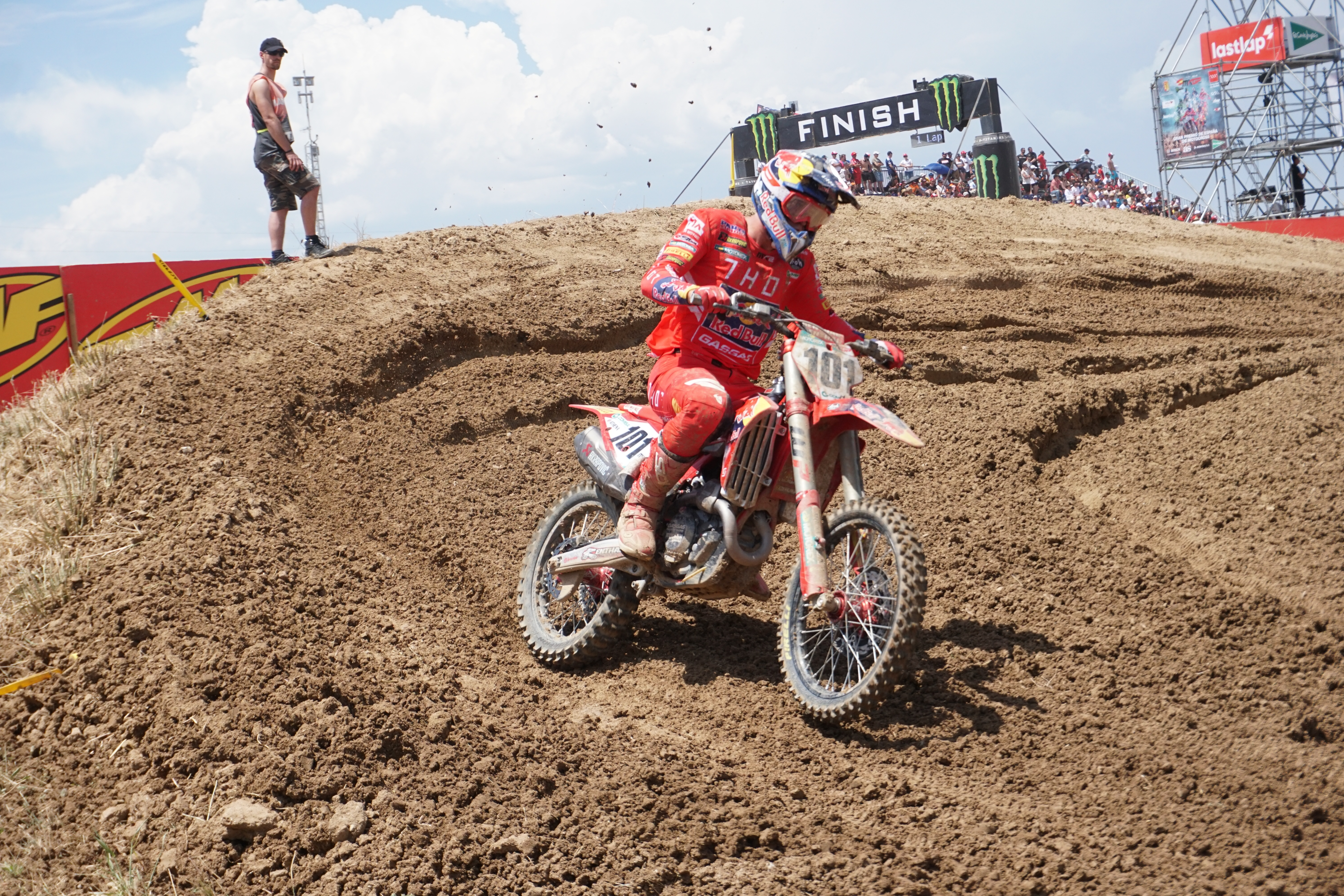
- Guadagnini in 2022
- Nationality: Italian
- Born: 11 April 2002 (age 24) Bassano del Grappa, Italy

Motocross career
- Years active: 2019-Present
- Teams: •Red Bull KTM Factory Racing Team (2020-2022); •Red Bull GasGas Factory Racing (2022-2023); •Nestaan Husqvarna Factory Racing (2023–2024); •Monster Energy Factory Ducati Racing Team (2024-2025); •Van Venrooy KTM Racing (2026-Present)
- Championships: •2019 EMX 125cc; •2019 FIM 125cc
- Wins: •MX2: 2

Mattia Guadagnini (born 11 April 2002) is an Italian professional motocross rider. He has competed in the Motocross World Championship since 2019.

== Biography ==
Guadagnini was born in Bassano del Grappa in the Veneto region of northern Italy. In 2018, he competed in the 125cc World Youth Championship and came second. In 2019, he managed to become European and World Champion in the 125cc class. At the end of the 2020 EMX250 season, he joined the Red Bull KTM Factory Racing Team De Carli to race the 2021 MX2 Motocross World Championship.

== Honours ==
Motocross of Nations

- Team Overall: 2021 (gold)

Italian Prestige Motocross Championship

- MX1: 2019, 2020 (gold)

European Motocross Championship

- 125cc: 2019 (gold)

FIM Motocross Junior World Championship

- 125cc: 2019 (gold)

== MXGP Results ==
Year	Rnd 1	Rnd 2	Rnd 3	Rnd 4	Rnd 5	Rnd 6	Rnd 7	Rnd 8	Rnd 9	Rnd 10	Rnd 11	Rnd 12	Rnd 13	Rnd 14	Rnd 15	Rnd 16	Rnd 17	Rnd 18	Rnd 19	Rnd 20	Average Finish	Podium Percent	Place
2021 MX2	8	2	1	10	1	12	3	4	3	11	11	2	4	12	4	14	8	4	-	-	6.33	33%	4th
2025 MXGP	4	15	4	OUT	OUT	OUT	10	15	21	22	14	OUT	12	14	24	17	17	16	11	7	13.94	-	17th
2026 MXGP	14 ARG (Argentina)	12 AND (Andalusia)	14 SUI (Switzerland)	18 SAR (Sardinia)	17 TRE	FRA (France)	GER (Germany)	LAT (Latvia)	ITA (Italy)	POR (Portugal)	RSA (South Africa)	GBR (United Kingdom)	CZE (Czech Republic)	FLA (Flanders)	SWE (Sweden)	NED (Netherlands)	TUR (Turkey)	CHN (China)	AUS (Australia)	-	15.00	-	24th
