= Thibault Benistant =

French motorcycle racer

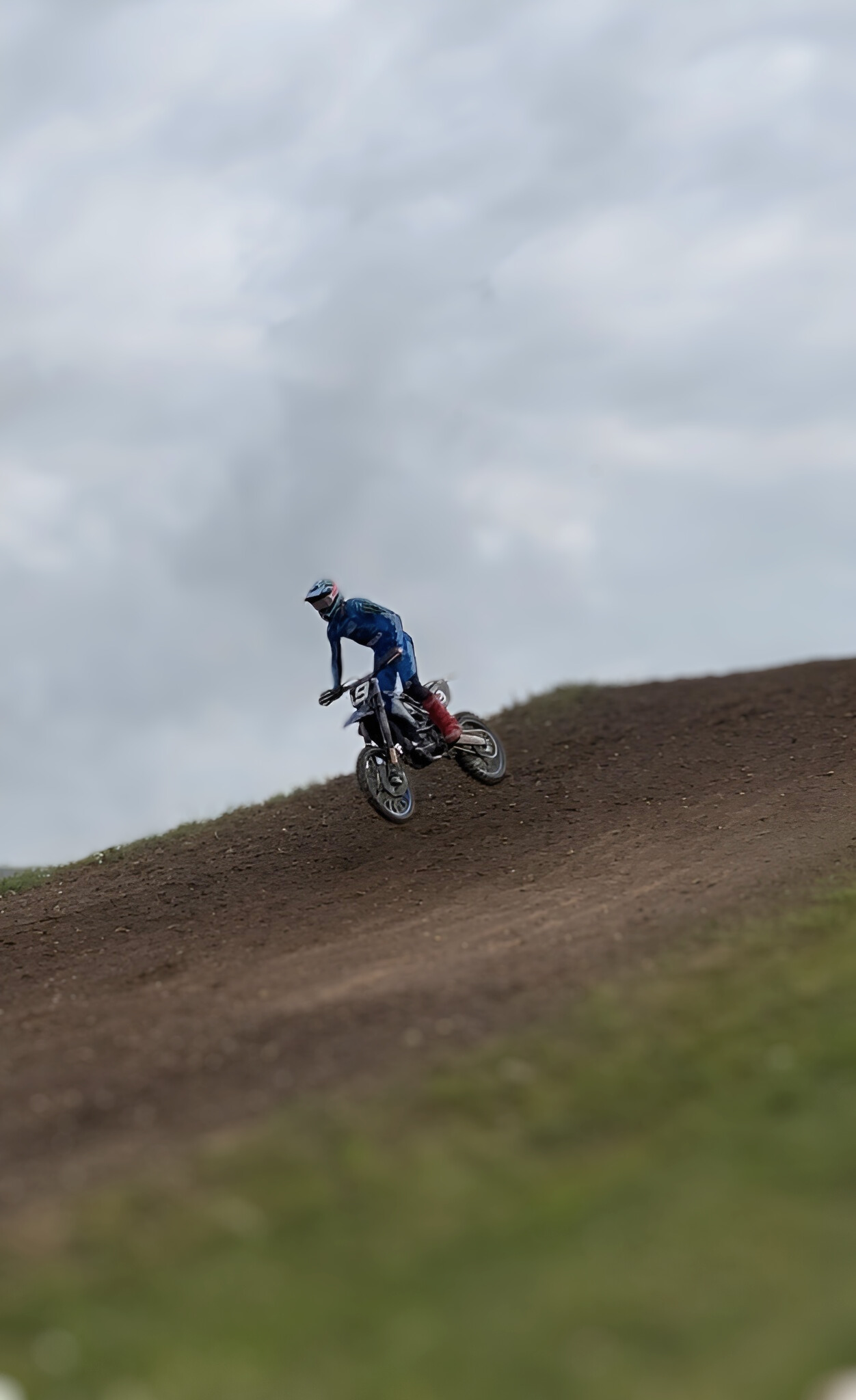
- Benistant in 2025
- Nationality: French
- Born: 31 July 2002 (age 24) Avignon, France

Motocross career
- Years active: 2020-present
- Teams: •MX2 Monster Energy Yamaha Factory Racing (2020-2025); •Team Honda Motoblouz SR Motul (2026-Present)
- Championships: •2018 EMX 125cc; •2020 EMX 250cc
- Wins: •MX2: 3

Thibault Benistant (born 31 July 2002) is a French professional motocross rider, currently competing in the MXGP World Championship.

== Career ==
Benistant has won several European Motocross Championships, including the EMX 125 in 2018 and the EMX 250 in 2020. In 2020, he signed a multi-year contract with Yamaha Motor Europe to race in the MX2 World Championship with a YZ250FM in the MX2 Monster Energy Yamaha Factory Team.

During his rookie season in the World Championship, Benistant achieved two race victories and secured a podium finish at the MX2 Czech Republic Grand Prix. Despite missing the final two rounds due to injury, he finished eighth in the 2021 MX2 World Championship.

In 2022, Benistant faced a setback when he had to take five months off the bike to recover from a knee injury, causing him to miss the first three rounds of the season. However, he returned to the track and claimed a MX2 Grand Prix victory, four race wins, and five GP podiums. Despite the injury, Benistant finished fifth in the 2022 MX2 World Championship.

Thibault was forced to withdraw from the MXGP World Championship following a serious crash at the French Grand Prix in Lacapelle-Marival on 24 May 2026. Thibault was reported to have lost the use of his legs; a fundraising campaign was launched to support him and his family and to help him return to racing as soon as possible.

== MXGP Results ==
Year	Rnd 1	Rnd 2	Rnd 3	Rnd 4	Rnd 5	Rnd 6	Rnd 7	Rnd 8	Rnd 9	Rnd 10	Rnd 11	Rnd 12	Rnd 13	Rnd 14	Rnd 15	Rnd 16	Rnd 17	Rnd 18	Rnd 19	Rnd 20	Average Finish	Podium Percent	Place
2020 MX2	OUT	OUT	OUT	OUT	OUT	OUT	OUT	OUT	OUT	OUT	OUT	OUT	OUT	OUT	7	6	4	OUT	-	-	5.67	-	22nd
2021 MX2	11	7	5	11	3	4	5	9	4	6	12	7	8	19	12	6	OUT	OUT	-	-	8.00	6%	8th
2022 MX2	OUT	OUT	OUT	7	4	5	11	3	6	3	1	3	2	6	7	7	2	6	-	-	4.87	40%	5th
2023 MX2	3	3	1	6	10	5	1	3	3	5	9	DNF	DNF	OUT	OUT	OUT	5	5	-	-	4.54	46%	9th
2024 MX2	4	6	8	2	3	5	OUT	OUT	OUT	OUT	OUT	OUT	OUT	OUT	OUT	OUT	6	10	7	3	5.40	30%	11th
2025 MX2	11	8	3	15	3	7	9	5	6	10	5	6	4	7	12	5	13	8	OUT	OUT	7.61	11%	7th
2026 MXGP	9 ARG (Argentina)	OUT AND (Andalusia)	OUT SUI (Switzerland)	28 SAR (Sardinia)	13 TRE	DNF FRA (France)	OUT GER (Germany)	OUT LAT (Latvia)	OUT ITA (Italy)	OUT POR (Portugal)	OUT RSA (South Africa)	OUT GBR (United Kingdom)	OUT CZE (Czech Republic)	OUT FLA (Flanders)	OUT SWE (Sweden)	OUT NED (Netherlands)	OUT TUR (Turkey)	OUT CHN (China)	OUT AUS (Australia)	-	16.67	-	30th
