= 2026 French Elite Motocross Championship =

French Motocross Competition in 2026

The 2026 French Elite Motocross Championship season was the 78th French Motocross Championship season.

The series consisted of six rounds for the two main categories, running from March to mid-June. Kevin Horgmo was the reigning champion in the Elite MX1 class, after picking up his first senior French Elite crown in 2025. After a close fought campaign, Maxime Desprey would ultimately take his fifth senior national title, beating Horgmo by fifteen points.

Mathys Boisramé was the reigning champion in Elite MX2, after he won his third senior title in the previous season. Spanish rider Francisco García would be crowned champion in his first year racing in the series, after winning three of the six overall rounds.

== Race calendar and results ==
=== Elite MX1 ===
Round	Date	Location	Race 1 Winner	Race 2 Winner	Round Winner
1	1 March	(Occitania) Castelnau-de-Lévis	(France) Tom Vialle	(France) Maxime Desprey	(France) Maxime Desprey
2	5 April	(Charente-Maritime) Saint-Jean-d'Angély	(Norway) Kevin Horgmo	(France) Thibault Benistant	(Norway) Kevin Horgmo
3	26 April	(Brittany) Romagné	(Netherlands) Jeffrey Herlings	(Netherlands) Jeffrey Herlings	(Netherlands) Jeffrey Herlings
4	3 May	(Bourgogne-Franche-Comté) Frotey-lès-Vesoul	(France) Maxime Desprey	(Norway) Kevin Horgmo	(France) Maxime Desprey
5	17 May	(Occitania) Gaillac-Toulza	(France) Tom Vialle	(France) Tom Vialle	(France) Tom Vialle
6	14 June	(Brittany) Iffendic	(France) Romain Febvre	(France) Romain Febvre	(France) Romain Febvre

=== Elite MX2 ===
Round	Date	Location	Race 1 Winner	Race 2 Winner	Round Winner
1	1 March	(Occitania) Castelnau-de-Lévis	(Spain) Francisco García	(Spain) Francisco García	(Spain) Francisco García
2	5 April	(Charente-Maritime) Saint-Jean-d'Angély	(Spain) Francisco García	(Spain) Francisco García	(Spain) Francisco García
3	26 April	(Brittany) Romagné	(Spain) Francisco García	(France) Mathys Boisramé	(France) Mathys Boisramé
4	3 May	(Bourgogne-Franche-Comté) Frotey-lès-Vesoul	(Spain) Francisco García	(Spain) Francisco García	(Spain) Francisco García
5	17 May	(Occitania) Gaillac-Toulza	(France) Mathis Valin	(France) Mathis Valin	(France) Mathis Valin
6	14 June	(Brittany) Iffendic	(France) Mathis Valin	(France) Mathis Valin	(France) Mathis Valin

=== Circuit locations ===
2026 French Elite Motocross Championship locations

== Elite MX1 ==
=== Participants ===
Team	Constructor	No	Rider	Rounds
Team Honda Motoblouz SR Motul	Honda	9	(France) Thibault Benistant	1–5
Team Honda Motoblouz SR Motul	Honda	24	(Norway) Kevin Horgmo	All
Team TMX Competition	KTM	11	(France) Calvin Fonvieille	All
2B Moto Beta	Beta	14	(France) Arnaud Aubin	6
2B Moto Beta	Beta	758	(France) Raffaël Blond	All
2B Moto Beta	Beta	817	(France) Jason Clermont	All
Honda HRC PETRONAS	Honda	16	(France) Tom Vialle	1, 5
Honda HRC PETRONAS	Honda	84	(Netherlands) Jeffrey Herlings	3
FB Factory Motorsport	Husqvarna	27	(France) Hugo Manzato	2, 5
FB Factory Motorsport	Husqvarna	831	(France) Brice Maylin	2–5
STTL/MotoTeam81/S-Tech Racing Products	Yamaha	831	(France) Brice Maylin	1
De Nardo Yamaha Racing	Yamaha	31	(France) Adrien Malaval	All
De Nardo Yamaha Racing	Yamaha	810	(France) Yann Crnjanski	4
Team GSM HBI Dafy Michelin Yamaha	Yamaha	34	(France) Bogdan Krajewski	1–5
Team GSM HBI Dafy Michelin Yamaha	Yamaha	141	(France) Maxime Desprey	All
Triumph France/TLD Moto France	Triumph	49	(France) Tom Guyon	1–2, 6
Team VHR	Yamaha	64	(France) Romain Pape	2–3, 6
	Yamaha	70	(France) Shaun Vinel	1–2, 4–5
MB Team	Honda	85	(France) Cédric Soubeyras	1
Team Ride Innovation Development	Kawasaki	95	(France) Enzo Casat	All
Diabolic Moto/MR Constructions	Husqvarna	97	(France) Dorian Juin	1
	Stark	99	(France) Jimmy Grajwoda	1–3, 5
	Yamaha	105	(France) Enzo Gapaix	1–2, 4
	Yamaha	109	(France) Loïc Rombaut	1–2, 6
	Yamaha	154	(France) Noa Quinzeling	2, 4, 6
Team MS Motorsport Fantic Drag’on Tek	Fantic	156	(France) Maxime Sot	2
	Yamaha	161	(France) Loukas Poulain	1, 3
Suttel Group ADN Honda	Honda	166	(France) Loan Bourroumana	1–2
	Suzuki	169	(France) Victor Krompholtz	4
Yamaha France/Yam Center Merignac	Yamaha	190	(France) Joey Nuques	5
JMP Camp's MX School	KTM	193	(France) Tanguy Prost	All
	Suzuki	194	(France) Florian Bertin	1, 3
MRT Racing Team	Honda	208	(France) Axel Billottet	1–5
	Yamaha	216	(France) Enzo Boutin	2
	Yamaha	222	(France) Enzo Da-Ré	1–2, 5
Team Moindrot Sport Loisir	Yamaha	233	(France) Oscar Ciret	1
	Beta	238	(France) Charly Teillet	2
Team New Bike Yamaha	Yamaha	259	(France) Julien Lebeau	1
	KTM	283	(France) Dylan Brillant	2–3, 5
Stark Future/Oxmoto	Stark	338	(France) David Herbreteau	1–3, 5
NITRX Racing Team	Kawasaki	342	(France) Mathieu Santoni	1
	Yamaha	346	(France) Alex Dietre	1, 4
	Yamaha	353	(France) Tom Ferreira	4
	Gas Gas	379	(France) Florian Vicente	1–3, 5
	Honda	381	(France) Thomas Herpin	2
	Yamaha	403	(France) Tom Migault	2
	Kawasaki	431	(Belgium) Jeremy Coen	1
	KTM	455	(France) Jean-Charles Schneider	4
JMSX Racing Team	TM	471	(France) Johan Marillier	1
Cap Motos 25	KTM	485	(France) Alexis Schmitt	4
	KTM	505	(France) Dorian Koch	1
Chave Motos	Honda	520	(France) Jimmy Clochet	All
	Yamaha	531	(France) Nathan Laquière	2
	Honda	536	(France) Enzo Di Guisto	1–3, 5
	KTM	546	(France) Victor Legeard	3
	KTM	612	(France) Thibaud Dauzac	2
	Husqvarna	614	(France) Nicolas Simonnet	4
	Yamaha	616	(France) Cyril Bassan	2
Suttel Group ADN Honda/Moto Park Montpellier	Honda	630	(France) Romain Martin	1–2, 5
	Honda	643	(France) Antoine Colombet	2
	Yamaha	646	(France) Valentin Maillet	1
Kent1Moto/NC Racing	Gas Gas	648	(France) Florian Pirard	1, 5
	Husqvarna	665	(France) Stephen Farey	1
	KTM	684	(France) Marvin Darriet	2, 5
BR Motos	Husqvarna	709	(Spain) Nil Bussot	5
	Yamaha	752	(France) Julien Pelletier	1–3, 5–6
	Husqvarna	802	(France) Benjamin Gerber	All
Cobo Concept/JLB Racing	Honda	819	(France) Guillaume Brun	5
Evolution 7 Limoges	Yamaha	821	(France) Julien Bonnaudin	2
Afil Services	KTM	828	(Belgium) Tom Dukerts	3–4
AG Motorsport	Kawasaki	836	(France) Anthony Grosjean	4
Team LR Motorsports	Kawasaki	843	(France) Julien Liaigre	2
	KTM	875	(France) Stéphane Jeannin	4
	Yamaha	877	(France) Enzo Gregori Garrido	1, 5
Featime/L2H Design	Yamaha	894	(France) Julien Cabioch	3
	Yamaha	898	(France) Alexis Laurent	1–4, 6
	Beta	922	(France) Dylan Brard	All
	Yamaha	947	(France) Damien Hermet	1–3, 5
	Honda	948	(France) Maxime Pelaudeix	2–3, 5
Team LH955	Yamaha	955	(France) Lilian Henry	4
	Yamaha	971	(France) Tino Basso	1, 6
	Yamaha	985	(France) Bryan Wlodarski	1–2, 4
Team 33 Accessoires	Kawasaki	991	(France) Alexandre Bosc	2
Kawasaki Racing Team MXGP	Kawasaki	998	(France) Romain Febvre	6

=== Riders Championship ===
Points are awarded to riders per race in the following format:

Place	1	2	3	4	5	6	7	8	9	10	11	12	13	14	15	16	17	18	19	20	21	22	23	24	25	26	27	28	29	30	31	32	33	34	35	36	37	38	39	40+
Points	50	44	40	38	36	35	34	33	32	31	30	29	28	27	26	25	24	23	22	21	20	19	18	17	16	15	14	13	12	11	10	9	8	7	6	5	4	3	2	1

Pos	Rider	Bike	CDL (Occitania)		SJA (Charente-Maritime)		ROM (Brittany)		VES (Bourgogne-Franche-Comté)		GAT (Occitania)		IFF (Brittany)		Points
1	(France) Maxime Desprey	Yamaha	2	1	9	3	2^{50}	5^{38}	1	2	4	4	3	3	504
2	(Norway) Kevin Horgmo	Honda	10	5	1	2	8^{34}	2^{50}	5	1	5	3	2	4	489
3	(France) Adrien Malaval	Yamaha	5	8	2	7	6^{36}	8^{34}	4	5	3	6	5	7	436
4	(France) Thibault Benistant	Honda	3	2	6	1	3^{44}	3^{44}	2	3	2	2			429
5	(France) Jimmy Clochet	Honda	7	9	8	9	7^{35}	7^{35}	8	7	8	8	8	6	402
6	(France) Calvin Fonvieille	KTM	9	7	10	10	10^{32}	12^{30}	9	8	7	7	10	9	386
7	(France) Jason Clermont	Beta	12	21	11	12	11^{31}	11^{31}	6	11	10	9	6	5	369
8	(France) Brice Maylin	Yamaha	6	6	4	6	5^{38}	4^{40}	3	6	6	5			367
9	(France) Bogdan Krajewski	Yamaha	11	11	7	8	4^{40}	9^{33}	7	4	9	10			335
10	(France) Raffaël Blond	Beta	17	15	13	15	12^{30}	15^{27}	13	13	12	13	13	12	331
11	(France) Tanguy Prost	KTM	15	14	15	11	13^{29}	14^{28}	12	12	11	11	Ret	DNS	284
12	(France) Julien Pelletier	Yamaha	Ret	16	21	14	16^{26}	16^{26}			13	19	11	10	235
13	(France) Romain Pape	Yamaha			3	5	9^{33}	6^{36}					4	2	227
14	(France) Enzo Casat	Kawasaki	23	Ret	18	21	17^{25}	Ret	20	20	18	16	17	14	227
15	(France) David Herbreteau	Stark	14	13	20	13	14^{28}	10^{32}			16	12			218
16	(France) Dylan Brard	Beta	20	30	24	25	21^{21}	21^{21}	22	23	Ret	24	14	16	213
17	(France) Tom Guyon	Triumph	8	10	5	4							7	8	205
18	(France) Tom Vialle	Honda	1	3							1	1			190
19	(France) Damien Hermet	Yamaha	21	22	17	24	19^{23}	18^{24}			22	21			166
20	(France) Loïc Rombaut	Yamaha	16	17	14	16							9	11	163
21	(France) Benjamin Gerber	Husqvarna	DNQ	31	DNQ	DNQ	24^{18}	22^{20}	27	26	25	23	16	17	160
22	(France) Axel Billottet	Honda	24	DNS	23	23	18^{24}	17^{25}	19	14	Ret	DNS			151
23	(France) Noa Quinzeling	Yamaha			19	19			16	17			18	15	142
24	(Belgium) Tom Dukerts	KTM					15^{27}	13^{29}	11	10					117
25	(France) Alexis Laurent	Yamaha	DNQ	35	32	32	23^{19}	26^{16}	23	27			15	Ret	117
26	(France) Shaun Vinel	Yamaha	30	28	26	Ret			24	24	21	22			112
27	(France) Romain Febvre	Kawasaki											1	1	100
28	(France) Dylan Brillant	KTM			30	28	25^{17}	24^{18}			26	25			90
29	(France) Bryan Wlodarski	Yamaha	26	24	29	33			25	21					88
30	(France) Maxime Pelaudeix	Honda			Ret	Ret	20^{22}	20^{22}			23	20			83
31	(France) Alex Dietre	Yamaha	27	23					17	18					79
32	(France) Cédric Soubeyras	Honda	4	4											76
33	(France) Jimmy Grajwoda	Stark	29	Ret	22	22	Ret	19^{23}			Ret	Ret			73
34	(France) Enzo Di Guisto	Honda	34	32	DNQ	DNQ	29^{13}	27^{15}			27	27			72
35	(France) Enzo Gregori Garrido	Yamaha	Ret	25							15	14			69
36	(France) Yann Crnjanski	Yamaha							10	9					63
37	(France) Julien Lebeau	Yamaha	13	12											57
38	(France) Romain Martin	Honda	33	29	33	31					24	Ret			55
39	(France) Julien Bonnaudin	Yamaha			12	17									53
40	(France) Joey Nuques	Yamaha									14	15			53
41	(France) Lilian Henry	Yamaha							14	15					53
42	(France) Alexis Schmitt	KTM							15	16					51
43	(France) Maxime Sot	Fantic			16	18									48
44	(France) Loan Bourroumana	Honda	32	27	31	26									48
45	(Spain) Nil Bussot	Husqvarna									19	17			46
46	(France) Hugo Manzato	Husqvarna			Ret	20					17	Ret			45
47	(Belgium) Jeremy Coen	Kawasaki	18	19											45
48	(France) Guillaume Brun	Honda									20	18			44
49	(France) Mathieu Santoni	Kawasaki	19	20											43
50	(France) Nicolas Simonnet	Husqvarna							18	22					42
51	(France) Dorian Koch	KTM	22	18											42
52	(France) Anthony Grosjean	Kawasaki							21	19					42
53	(France) Florian Bertin	Suzuki	28	34			22^{20}	DNS							40
54	(France) Julian Cabioch	Yamaha					27^{15}	23^{19}							34
55	(France) Victor Legeard	KTM					26^{16}	25^{17}							33
56	(France) Jean-Charles Schneider	KTM							26	25					31
57	(France) Stephen Farey	Husqvarna	25	26											31
58	(France) Arnaud Aubin	Beta											12	Ret	29
59	(France) Tino Basso	Yamaha	Ret	DNS									Ret	13	28
60	(France) Florian Vicente	Gas Gas	DNQ	DNQ	DNQ	DNQ					28	26			28
61	(France) Cyril Bassan	Yamaha			27	30									25
62	(France) Alexandre Bosc	Kawasaki			28	29									25
63	(France) Victor Krompholtz	Suzuki							30	28					24
64	(France) Tom Ferreira	Yamaha							29	29					24
65	(France) Marvin Darriet	KTM			36	Ret					Ret	28			18
66	(France) Enzo Gapaix	Yamaha	36	Ret	DNQ	DNQ			28	Ret					18
67	(France) Enzo Boutin	Yamaha			25	Ret									16
68	(France) Loukas Poulain	Yamaha	DNQ	DNQ			28^{14}	DNS							14
69	(France) Thibaud Dauzac	KTM			Ret	27									14
70	(France) Johan Marillier	TM	35	33											14
71	(France) Thomas Herpin	Honda			34	34									14
72	(France) Antoine Colombet	Honda			35	35									12
73	(France) Florian Pirard	Gas Gas	31	Ret							Ret	DNS			10
	(France) Charly Teillet	Beta			Ret	Ret									0
	(France) Enzo Da-Ré	Yamaha	DNQ	DNQ	DNQ	DNQ					Ret	DNS			0
	(France) Dorian Juin	Husqvarna	Ret	DNS											0
	(France) Stephane Jeannin	KTM							DNS	DNS					0
	(France) Valentin Maillet	Yamaha	DNQ	DNQ											0
	(France) Oscar Ciret	Yamaha	DNQ	DNQ											0
	(France) Tom Migault	Yamaha			DNQ	DNQ									0
	(France) Julien Liaigre	Kawasaki			DNQ	DNQ									0
	(France) Nathan Laquière	Yamaha			DNQ	DNQ									0
Riders ineligible for championship points
	(Netherlands) Jeffrey Herlings	Honda					1	1							0
Pos	Rider	Bike	CDL (Occitania)		SJA (Charente-Maritime)		ROM (Brittany)		VES (Bourgogne-Franche-Comté)		GAT (Occitania)		IFF (Brittany)		Points

== Elite MX2 ==
=== Participants ===
Team	Constructor	No	Rider	Rounds
737 Performance KTM/D’stock 41	KTM	1	(France) Mathys Boisramé	All
BUD Racing Kawasaki	Kawasaki	3	(Australia) Jake Cannon	All
BUD Racing Kawasaki	Kawasaki	29	(Spain) Francisco García	All
2B Moto Beta	Beta	14	(France) Arnaud Aubin	1–3
2B Moto Beta	Beta	204	(France) Elwan van de Wouw	All
Team VHR Racing	Yamaha	17	(France) Tom Brunet	All
Team AG Motorsport	KTM	22	(France) Mickaël Lamarque	1–2, 5
Triumph Lanester	Triumph	41	(France) Nicolas Duhamel	2–3, 6
Team New Bike Yamaha	Yamaha	55	(France) Mathis Barthez	1–5
	Stark	57	(France) Pierre Goupillon	3, 6
Stark Future/Oxmoto	Stark	66	(France) Yannis Lopez	1–2, 4–6
	Yamaha	77	(France) Baptiste Bordes	1
	Fantic	86	(France) Alexandre Grondin	2
SixtySeven Racing Team	KTM	100	(Belgium) Harry Seel	4
	Honda	101	(France) Nathan Lindecker	4
BvZ Racing	KTM	103	(Andorra) Martin Kettlitz	2, 6
AS MX Racing Team	KTM	111	(France) Anthony Stievenard	2
	KTM	115	(France) Ryan Langlois	1–5
Team Ambiance Moto	Beta	118	(France) Emerick Vergote	1–2
	KTM	119	(France) Sacha Chauvire	2–3
Vision Design MX/Glorybomb	KTM	123	(Switzerland) Remo Schudel	1
MX Team GH125	KTM	125	(France) Guillaume Haudebault	1, 3–4, 6
SCM Racing	Fantic	131	(France) Loris Vidal	1–2
Motoland KTM	KTM	133	(France) Tom Caneele	3, 6
	KTM	140	(France) Meidy Loudoux	1, 5
	Honda	147	(Spain) Ramon Vidal	1–2, 5
Team Ride Innovation Development	Honda	151	(Switzerland) Eliot Vidalenc	1–5
	KTM	153	(France) Mathis Matte	3
Team Honda Motoblouz SR Motul	Honda	158	(France) April Franzoni	2–3
KMR Treize	KTM	188	(France) Ilyes Ortiz	1
	Honda	202	(France) Corentin Normand	4
	Honda	205	(France) Evan Lhommedé	2–3
	Kawasaki	228	(France) Maxime Miet	2, 5
	KTM	237	(France) Thomas Armandie	1–3, 5
Ohmeca Racing/In & Motion/TM France	TM	240	(France) Johan Briand	2
LG Motorss	Gas Gas	251	(France) Paul Maigne	1–2
BetterBrands Petroleum/Kawasaki France	Kawasaki	256	(France) Basile Pigois	All
Triumph France/Triumph St-Maximin	Triumph	268	(France) Thibault Maupin	All
VHR Yamaha Official EMX250 Team	Yamaha	295	(France) Mano Faure	1
VHR Yamaha Official EMX250 Team	Yamaha	503	(Belgium) Jarne Bervoets	3
2L Racing Team	KTM	299	(France) Dylan Conti	1–4
Team TMX Competition	KTM	301	(France) Liam Bruneau	6
	KTM	306	(France) Matteo Maurin-Porelli	1, 4–5
Pro-Stage/TRP Moto/Motoland Amiens	Yamaha	310	(France) Damon Langue	3
Kawasaki Racing Team MX2	Kawasaki	317	(France) Mathis Valin	5–6
FTO Racing	Kawasaki	321	(France) Maho Simo	All
	Yamaha	324	(France) Maxime Charlier	2
	Yamaha	329	(France) Eden Mabileau	2
	Yamaha	334	(France) Allan Bey	4
	Honda	348	(France) Maxim Sonnerat	1
	Fantic	349	(France) Pacome Laugeois	6
	KTM	372	(France) Lucas Monnin	4
LeBlockPass	Yamaha	375	(France) Christophe Rui	2
	Yamaha	383	(France) Loris Rubio-Pacou	1
Team Moindrot Sport Loisir	Yamaha	389	(France) Jules Pietre	All
Stark Future/Oxmoto	Stark	394	(France) Loris Bret	2–5
TM Racing France/FTO Racing	TM	398	(France) Kyliane Rocca	6
Team AG Motorsport	Husqvarna	430	(France) Soan Lefort	2
	Beta	479	(France) Bastien Vicente	1–2, 5
	Fantic	492	(France) Hugo Menard	2
Esprit Moto	TM	494	(France) Ruben Gestas	2, 5
	Honda	495	(France) Laures Delamare	6
	KTM	504	(France) Loïc Gendron	2
Husqvarna Motorcycles Benelux	Husqvarna	512	(Belgium) Uwe De Waele	1, 3
	Honda	514	(France) Matheo Barbarin	1
	Yamaha	518	(France) Tim Fortanier	1–2, 5
Kawa Passion/Kawasaki France	Kawasaki	519	(France) Mateo Bernard	1–5
	Honda	527	(France) Evan Demeester	3
	KTM	547	(France) Alexandre Lejeune	4
Dafy Moto Angoulême	Kawasaki	557	(France) Dorian Parisis	2
	Yamaha	558	(France) Enzo Andouy-Schneider	1
Jezyk Racing	Triumph	559	(France) Félix Cardineau	1
CEC Racing	Husqvarna	584	(Sweden) Casper Lindmark	1–2
2b Moto	Beta	588	(France) Kevin Tarallo	5
KTM France/MotoTeam81/WRT Globex	KTM	589	(France) Kiliann Poll	All
Team Vizion Racing Sport	KTM	598	(New Caledonia) Ethan Lepigeon	1–2, 5
Kawasaki France/Latitude Moto	Kawasaki	606	(France) Killian Vincent	2–3
Team MX Start	Honda	613	(France) Lony Ferrer	1, 5
	Kawasaki	638	(France) Mateo Chastel	1–3, 6
	KTM	642	(France) Jules Ammer	1–2
	KTM	672	(France) Hugo Laureys	5
Heinen Racing Team	KTM	681	(Luxembourg) Jamie Heinen	4
	Honda	692	(France) Maxime Chauveau	2
Team Beta MRT Racing	Beta	717	(France) Alexis Fueri	All
	Yamaha	718	(France) Tristan Blanc	1
Team WID Motorsport	KTM	720	(France) Ilann Werle	2
	Yamaha	735	(France) Baptiste Ligier	4
Reptil Racing Development/FTO Racing/TM France	TM	744	(France) Saad Soulimani	All
	KTM	745	(France) Jules Lejeune	4
	Suzuki	761	(France) Marvyn Vigny	5
Boutaca Racing Team	KTM	778	(Portugal) Gonçalo Cardoso	5–6
	KTM	782	(France) Timeo Leloup	2–3
	Yamaha	796	(France) Rémy Anger	2–3, 6
Max Bikes/LMR Products	Kawasaki	806	(France) Tristan Grumet	5
	Honda	807	(France) Théo Drapier	5
	KTM	820	(France) Robin Modet	5
Team Ride Innovation Development	Kawasaki	829	(France) Sasha Lagoda	1–5
Team Hfour	Kawasaki	857	(France) Hugo Vauthier	1–3
Tech 32 Racing	Triumph	882	(Italy) Matteo Russi	1
	Yamaha	891	(France) Jeremy Gritti	3
	Husqvarna	899	(France) Jules Gourribon	1–2, 5
Kawa 83 Toulon/Kawasaki France	Kawasaki	919	(France) Loris Rebuttini	1
	KTM	925	(France) Nicolas Clément	4
Suttel Group ADN Honda	Honda	938	(France) Mathias Mortreuil	1–3
	Yamaha	939	(France) Lucas Mas	1
	Yamaha	944	(France) Alexis Jund-Adelmann	5

=== Riders Championship ===
Points are awarded to riders per race in the following format:

Place	1	2	3	4	5	6	7	8	9	10	11	12	13	14	15	16	17	18	19	20	21	22	23	24	25	26	27	28	29	30	31	32	33	34	35	36	37	38	39	40+
Points	50	44	40	38	36	35	34	33	32	31	30	29	28	27	26	25	24	23	22	21	20	19	18	17	16	15	14	13	12	11	10	9	8	7	6	5	4	3	2	1

Pos	Rider	Bike	CDL (Occitania)		SJA (Charente-Maritime)		ROM (Brittany)		VES (Bourgogne-Franche-Comté)		GAT (Occitania)		IFF (Brittany)		Points
1	(Spain) Francisco García	Kawasaki	1	1	1	1	1	2	1	1	2	2	2	Ret	526
2	(Australia) Jake Cannon	Kawasaki	2	2	2	2	17	3	3	3	7	4	4	4	468
3	(France) Alexis Fueri	Beta	4	3	4	7	3	5	2	4	3	5	7	3	458
4	(France) Mathys Boisramé	KTM	8	8	3	3	2	1	6	2	35	3	3	2	449
5	(France) Jules Pietre	Yamaha	3	5	5	4	6	8	8	8	4	6	11	9	419
6	(France) Tom Brunet	Yamaha	9	7	7	6	5	4	4	5	12	8	9	6	412
7	(France) Thibault Maupin	Triumph	13	6	8	8	13	11	9	7	8	9	8	10	382
8	(France) Saad Soulimani	TM	18	Ret	6	5	7	9	5	6	5	7	5	5	373
9	(France) Kiliann Poll	KTM	7	9	16	17	11	6	7	10	13	10	10	11	365
10	(France) Yannis Lopez	Stark	28	16	10	10	10	12	15	13	6	11	12	12	337
11	(France) Maho Simo	Kawasaki	14	14	19	19	15	16	14	9	9	13	15	13	322
12	(France) Mateo Bernard	Kawasaki	11	11	18	9	12	10	18	11	15	12			283
13	(France) Elwan van de Wouw	Beta	29	15	Ret	15	18	14	12	12	14	17	13	14	278
14	(France) Basile Pigois	Kawasaki	17	21	Ret	18	16	26	13	17	Ret	18	18	15	231
15	(France) Mathis Valin	Kawasaki									1	1	1	1	200
16	(Switzerland) Eliot Vidalenc	Honda	24	23	20	21	23	20	21	16	29	20			193
17	(France) Sasha Lagoda	Kawasaki	23	25	21	25	22	30	16	18	18	21			191
18	(France) Nicolas Duhamel	Triumph			9	14	8	7					14	16	178
19	(France) Thomas Armandie	KTM	15	20	22	23	21	15			16	19			177
20	(France) Dylan Conti	KTM	12	12	15	13	14	21	26	Ret					174
21	(France) Mickaël Lamarque	KTM	10	10	11	35					11	14			155
22	(France) Ryan Langlois	KTM	26	22	DNQ	DNQ	25	23	22	19	20	24			147
23	(France) Mathis Barthez	Yamaha	Ret	Ret	12	16			11	Ret	10	16			140
24	(France) Loris Bret	Stark			31	33	20	19	19	Ret	19	26			120
25	(France) Pierre Goupillon	Stark					4	Ret					6	7	107
26	(France) Mateo Chastel	Kawasaki	19	28			27	29					21	18	104
27	(France) Killian Vincent	Kawasaki			23	20	19	13							89
28	(France) Jules Gourribon	Husqvarna	Ret	24	30	29					17	23			82
29	(Portugal) Gonçalo Cardoso	KTM									25	25	17	19	78
30	(Sweden) Casper Lindmark	Husqvarna	34	17	25	11									77
31	(New Caledonia) Ethan Lepigeon	KTM	21	Ret	Ret	12					Ret	15			75
32	(France) Mano Faure	Yamaha	5	4											74
33	(France) Guillaume Haudebault	KTM	DNQ	DNQ			32	32	Ret	26			22	20	73
34	(France) Rémy Anger	Yamaha			DNQ	DNQ	29	28					19	17	71
35	(France) Lony Ferrer	Honda	27	27							22	22			66
36	(France) Hugo Vauthier	Kawasaki	31	32	14	22									65
37	(France) Arnaud Aubin	Beta	6	Ret	13	Ret	Ret	Ret							63
38	(Spain) Ramon Vidal	Honda	Ret	26	Ret	27					21	27			63
39	(Belgium) Harry Seel	KTM							10	15					57
40	(Belgium) Jarne Bervoets	Yamaha					9	17							56
41	(France) Tom Caneele	KTM					35	18					16	Ret	54
42	(France) April Franzoni	Honda			27	34	24	25							54
43	(France) Ilyes Ortiz	KTM	16	13											53
44	(France) Alexandre Lejeune	KTM							20	14					48
45	(France) Matteo Maurin-Porelli	KTM	DNQ	DNQ					30	28	31	30			45
46	(France) Nathan Lindecker	Honda							17	23					42
47	(France) Félix Cardineau	Triumph	22	18											42
48	(France) Evan Lhommedé	Honda			29	28	Ret	24							42
49	(France) Mathias Mortreuil	Honda	33	36	28	26	Ret	Ret							41
50	(Andorra) Martin Kettlitz	KTM			DNQ	DNQ							23	21	38
51	(France) Allan Bey	Yamaha							24	21					37
52	(Luxembourg) Jamie Heinen	KTM							23	22					37
53	(France) Johan Briand	TM			24	24									34
54	(France) Emerick Vergote	Beta	32	34	33	31									34
55	(France) Liam Bruneau	KTM											Ret	8	33
56	(France) Nicolas Clément	KTM							29	20					33
57	(France) Maxim Sonnerat	Honda	20	29											33
58	(France) Jules Lejeune	KTM							25	25					32
59	(France) Kevin Tarallo	Beta									23	28			31
60	(France) Corentin Normand	Honda							28	24					30
61	(France) Sacha Chauvire	KTM			DNQ	DNQ	31	22							29
62	(France) Baptiste Ligier	Yamaha							27	27					28
63	(France) Tim Fortanier	Yamaha	DNQ	DNQ	DNQ	DNQ					26	29			27
64	(France) Maxime Charlier	Yamaha			17	Ret									24
65	(France) Damon Langue	Yamaha					28	31							23
66	(Italy) Matteo Russi	Triumph	Ret	19											22
67	(France) Alexis Jund-Adelmann	Yamaha									24	36			22
68	(France) Jérémy Gritti	Yamaha					33	27							22
69	(France) Marvyn Vigny	Suzuki									28	32			22
70	(France) Lucas Monnin	KTM							31	29					22
71	(France) Baptiste Bordes	Yamaha	30	30											22
72	(France) Laures Delamare	Honda											20	Ret	21
73	(France) Maxime Miet	Kawasaki			DNQ	DNQ					27	34			21
74	(France) Dorian Parisis	Kawasaki			34	30									18
75	(France) Maxime Chauveau	Honda			32	32									18
76	(France) Robin Modet	KTM									32	33			17
77	(France) Loris Rebuttini	Kawasaki	25	DNS											16
78	(France) Mathis Matte	KTM					26	Ret							15
79	(France) Eden Mabileau	Yamaha			26	Ret									15
80	(France) Timeo Leloup	KTM			DNQ	DNQ	34	33							15
81	(France) Tristan Grumet	Kawasaki									33	35			14
82	(France) Theo Drapier	Honda									30	DNS			11
83	(France) Evan Demeester	Honda					30	DNS							11
84	(France) Hugo Laureys	KTM									Ret	31			10
85	(France) Jules Ammer	KTM	Ret	31	DNQ	DNQ									10
86	(France) Enzo Audouy-Schneider	Yamaha	DNQ	33											8
87	(France) Bastien Vicente	Beta	DNQ	DNQ	DNQ	DNQ					34	Ret			7
88	(France) Paul Maigne	Gas Gas	DNQ	35	DNQ	DNQ									6
	(Belgium) Uwe De Waele	Husqvarna	DNQ	DNQ			Ret	Ret							0
	(France) Meidy Loudoux	KTM	DNQ	DNQ							Ret	Ret			0
	(France) Soan Lefort	Husqvarna			Ret	Ret									0
	(France) Kyliane Rocca	TM											Ret	Ret	0
	(Switzerland) Remo Schudel	KTM	Ret	DNS											0
	(France) Ilann Werle	KTM			Ret	DNS									0
	(France) Pacome Laugeois	Fantic											Ret	DNS	0
	(France) Alexandre Grondin	Fantic			DNQ	Ret									0
	(France) Ruben Gestas	KTM			DNQ	DNQ					DNS	DNS			0
	(France) Loris Vidal	Fantic	DNQ	DNQ	DNQ	DNQ									0
	(France) Lucas Mas	Yamaha	DNQ	DNQ											0
	(France) Tristan Blanc	Yamaha	DNQ	DNQ											0
	(France) Matheo Barbarin	Honda	DNQ	DNQ											0
	(France) Loris Rubio-Pacou	Yamaha	DNQ	DNQ											0
	(France) Christophe Rui	Yamaha			DNQ	DNQ									0
	(France) Hugo Menand	Fantic			DNQ	DNQ									0
	(France) Loïc Gendron	KTM			DNQ	DNQ									0
	(France) Anthony Stievenard	KTM			DNQ	DNQ									0
Pos	Rider	Bike	CDL (Occitania)		SJA (Charente-Maritime)		ROM (Brittany)		VES (Bourgogne-Franche-Comté)		GAT (Occitania)		IFF (Brittany)		Points
