= 2025 French Elite Motocross Championship =

French Motocross Competition in 2025

The 2025 French Elite Motocross Championship season was the 77th French Motocross Championship season.

The series consisted of six rounds for the two main categories, running from mid-February to late-June. Maxime Desprey was the reigning champion in the Elite MX1 class, after picking up his fourth senior French Elite crown in 2024. Desprey would go on to finish the season as runner-up to Kevin Horgmo, who took his first title in the championship.

Mathis Valin was the reigning champion in Elite MX2, after he won his first senior title in the previous season. Valin did not defend his title, with Mathys Boisramé taking his third title in the class.

== Race calendar and results ==
=== Elite MX1 ===
Round	Date	Location	Race 1 Winner	Race 2 Winner	Round Winner
1	16 February	(Occitania) Lacapelle-Marival	(France) Maxime Renaux	(France) Maxime Renaux	(France) Maxime Renaux
2	30 March	(Provence-Alpes-Côte d'Azur) Pernes-les-Fontaines	(Norway) Kevin Horgmo	(Norway) Kevin Horgmo	(Norway) Kevin Horgmo
3	27 April	(Occitania) Castelnau-de-Lévis	(Norway) Kevin Horgmo	(Norway) Kevin Horgmo	(Norway) Kevin Horgmo
4	18 May	(Occitania) Gaillac-Toulza	(Norway) Kevin Horgmo	(Norway) Kevin Horgmo	(Norway) Kevin Horgmo
5	15 June	(Hauts-de-France) Plomion	(France) Maxime Desprey	(France) Maxime Desprey	(France) Maxime Desprey
6	29 June	(Normandy) Rauville-la-Place	(France) Maxime Desprey	(France) Maxime Desprey	(France) Maxime Desprey

=== Elite MX2 ===
Round	Date	Location	Race 1 Winner	Race 2 Winner	Round Winner
1	16 February	(Occitania) Lacapelle-Marival	(France) Mathis Valin	(France) Mathis Valin	(France) Mathis Valin
2	30 March	(Provence-Alpes-Côte d'Azur) Pernes-les-Fontaines	(France) Thibault Benistant	(Spain) Francisco García	(France) Thibault Benistant
3	27 April	(Occitania) Castelnau-de-Lévis	(France) Calvin Fonvieille	(France) Calvin Fonvieille	(France) Calvin Fonvieille
4	18 May	(Occitania) Gaillac-Toulza	(France) Calvin Fonvieille	(France) Mathys Boisramé	(France) Mathys Boisramé
5	15 June	(Hauts-de-France) Plomion	(France) Mathys Boisramé	(Spain) Francisco García	(France) Mathys Boisramé
6	29 June	(Normandy) Rauville-la-Place	(Latvia) Jānis Reišulis	(Latvia) Jānis Reišulis	(Latvia) Jānis Reišulis

=== Circuit locations ===
2025 French Elite Motocross Championship locations

== Elite MX1 ==
=== Participants ===
Team	Constructor	No	Rider	Rounds
Yamaha Motor Switzerland	Yamaha	4	(Switzerland) Arnaud Tonus	3
Team OB1 Motorsport	Honda	8	(France) Nicolas Aubin	2, 4
Monster Energy Yamaha Factory MXGP Team	Yamaha	10	(Netherlands) Calvin Vlaanderen	1
Monster Energy Yamaha Factory MXGP Team	Yamaha	93	(Belgium) Jago Geerts	1
Monster Energy Yamaha Factory MXGP Team	Yamaha	959	(France) Maxime Renaux	1
Stark Future	Stark	12	(France) Yannis Irsuti	2–3
Team Honda Motoblouz SR Motul	Honda	24	(Norway) Kevin Horgmo	All
Team Honda Motoblouz SR Motul	Honda	303	(Italy) Alberto Forato	1, 4–6
Team TMX Competition	Yamaha	31	(France) Adrien Malaval	All
Team GSM HBI Dafy Michelin Yamaha	Yamaha	34	(France) Bogdan Krajewski	1–4
Team GSM HBI Dafy Michelin Yamaha	Yamaha	141	(France) Maxime Desprey	All
Kawasaki Racing Team MXGP	Kawasaki	41	(Latvia) Pauls Jonass	1
Kawasaki Racing Team MXGP	Kawasaki	103	(France) Romain Febvre	1
Tech 32 Racing	Triumph	49	(France) Tom Guyon	All
Team Berryli4ni	Yamaha	53	(France) Romain Pape	1
	Stark	70	(France) Shaun Vinel	4
Suttel Group ADN Honda	Honda	72	(France) Lucas Imbert	2–4
	Honda	104	(France) Brice Guerin	2
	Honda	105	(France) Enzo Gapaix	1–2, 4–6
Team LMSens MX Beta	Beta	109	(France) Loïc Rombaut	All
	Honda	118	(France) Mathis Reynier	2
	Yamaha	137	(France) Adrien Escoffier	2
Team 33 Accessoires/Yam Center Merignac	Yamaha	150	(France) Joey Nuques	3–4
Team Ride Innovation Development	Kawasaki	166	(France) Loan Bourroumana	1–3
First Racer/Activa Motors	Suzuki	169	(France) Victor Krompholtz	All
	Beta	220	(France) Toni Giorgessi	4
	Yamaha	222	(France) Enzo Da-Ré	1
Team Moindrot Sport Loisir	Yamaha	233	(France) Oscar Ciret	2
	Honda	269	(France) Sacha de Monmahou	2
	Honda	270	(France) Mathieu Letellier	6
SportMotos#50	KTM	304	(France) Benjamin Levallois	6
	Honda	327	(France) Malween Jourdaine	6
Cat Moto Bauerschmidt Husqvarna	Husqvarna	331	(Switzerland) Loris Freidig	3–4
	Yamaha	332	(France) Theo Roussaly	4
Stark Future/Oxmoto	Stark	338	(France) David Herbreteau	All
Motoland Seclin/KTM Lille	KTM	341	(Belgium) Mattéo Puffet	3
	Yamaha	346	(France) Alex Dietre	2
	Yamaha	382	(France) Laurent Dohr	6
	Kawasaki	395	(France) Florian Gazaigne	3–4
	Beta	422	(France) Antoine François	6
Drag'On Tek	Yamaha	426	(Belgium) Tias Callens	6
	KTM	433	(France) Fabien Fradet	2
	Honda	443	(France) Gregory Puech	3
	KTM	448	(France) Tony Seignobos	2
ML MX Team	Gas Gas	474	(Belgium) Jonas Salaets	3
	KTM	477	(France) Nicolas Leblanc	6
	Yamaha	531	(France) Nathan Laquiere	3–4
	Honda	536	(France) Enzo Di Guisto	4
	Honda	560	(France) Cyril Courthieu	3–4
	Suzuki	576	(France) Dorian Martinez	1–2
R.F.K Racing	Kawasaki	588	(France) Kevin Tarallo	3
	Beta	622	(France) Dylan Brard	3–4
	Honda	630	(France) Romain Martin	All
LEF Racing	Suzuki	632	(Belgium) Florent Lambillon	5
JD Factory/LMR Products	Yamaha	640	(France) Jules Almayrac	1
	Yamaha	641	(France) Jason Maggiolini	2
Kent1Moto/NC Racing	Gas Gas	646	(France) Florian Pirard	1–4
	Yamaha	701	(France) Martin Outrequin	6
B.R. Motos Husqvarna	Husqvarna	709	(Spain) Nil Bussot	4
Hot Motorbike KTM	KTM	710	(Belgium) Adrien Wagener	5
	Kawasaki	711	(France) Enzo Gregori Garrido	2
	Yamaha	742	(France) Maxime Jeanne	6
2B Moto Beta	Beta	758	(France) Raffaël Blond	1–3
2B Moto Beta	Beta	817	(France) Jason Clermont	All
	Husqvarna	802	(France) Benjamin Gerber	3
	KTM	803	(France) Christopher Roquier	6
AGMX Honda	Honda	837	(Switzerland) Xylian Ramella	2
Triumph Lanester	Triumph	838	(France) Raphaël Dauphinot	5
DAM Racing/6.3 Design	Gas Gas	846	(Belgium) Mike Roose	5
	Kawasaki	888	(France) Anthony Platero	4
	Yamaha	898	(France) Alexis Laurent	All
	Honda	912	(France) Maximin Benoit	2
	Gas Gas	923	(France) Michaël Bridier	6
KTM Faktory	KTM	940	(France) Antoine Cossé	1–4
	Yamaha	971	(France) Tino Basso	1, 3–6
Aub Moto	Fantic	980	(France) Thomas Zoldos	5
	Fantic	984	(France) Fabien Leroy	5
	Yamaha	985	(France) Bryan Wlodarski	2, 4–5

=== Riders Championship ===
Points are awarded to riders per race in the following format:

Place	1	2	3	4	5	6	7	8	9	10	11	12	13	14	15	16	17	18	19	20	21	22	23	24	25	26	27	28	29	30	31	32	33	34	35	36	37	38	39	40+
Points	50	44	40	38	36	35	34	33	32	31	30	29	28	27	26	25	24	23	22	21	20	19	18	17	16	15	14	13	12	11	10	9	8	7	6	5	4	3	2	1

Pos	Rider	Bike	LCM (Occitania)		PLF (Provence-Alpes-Côte d'Azur)		CDL (Occitania)		GAT (Occitania)		PLO (Hauts-de-France)		RLP (Normandy)		Points
1	(Norway) Kevin Horgmo	Honda	6^{36}	7^{36}	1^{50}	1^{50}	1^{50}	1^{50}	1^{50}	1^{50}	3^{40}	8^{33}	4^{38}	4^{38}	521
2	(France) Maxime Desprey	Yamaha	4^{40}	9^{35}	3^{40}	2^{44}	Ret	5^{36}	3^{40}	4^{38}	1^{50}	1^{50}	1^{50}	1^{50}	473
3	(France) Adrien Malaval	Yamaha	9^{35}	5^{38}	2^{44}	4^{38}	5^{36}	3^{40}	4^{38}	2^{44}	4^{38}	2^{44}	5^{36}	5^{36}	467
4	(France) Tom Guyon	Triumph	12^{32}	12^{32}	6^{35}	3^{40}	4^{38}	4^{38}	2^{44}	3^{40}	2^{44}	4^{38}	3^{40}	3^{40}	461
5	(France) Jason Clermont	Beta	13^{31}	14^{30}	31^{10}	10^{31}	6^{35}	11^{30}	7^{34}	8^{33}	6^{35}	6^{35}	6^{35}	6^{35}	374
6	(France) David Herbreteau	Stark	11^{33}	13^{31}	24^{17}	11^{30}	9^{32}	7^{34}	14^{27}	11^{30}	8^{33}	13^{28}	9^{32}	7^{34}	361
7	(France) Loïc Rombaut	Beta	16^{28}	18^{26}	32^{9}	14^{27}	13^{29}	10^{31}	13^{28}	9^{32}	13^{28}	7^{34}	7^{34}	8^{33}	339
8	(France) Tino Basso	Yamaha	15^{29}	16^{28}			7^{34}	12^{29}	9^{32}	13^{28}	7^{34}	5^{36}	8^{33}	9^{32}	315
9	(Italy) Alberto Forato	Honda	5^{38}	4^{40}					6^{35}	6^{35}	5^{36}	3^{40}	2^{44}	2^{44}	312
10	(France) Bogdan Krajewski	Yamaha	10^{34}	10^{34}	7^{34}	6^{35}	2^{44}	2^{44}	5^{36}	5^{36}					297
11	(France) Alexis Laurent	Yamaha	23^{21}	23^{21}	22^{19}	23^{18}	22^{20}	19^{23}	21^{20}	22^{19}	17^{24}	17^{24}	12^{29}	12^{29}	267
12	(France) Romain Martin	Honda	24^{20}	22^{22}	21^{20}	21^{20}	20^{22}	DNS	18^{23}	19^{22}	16^{25}	15^{26}	11^{30}	11^{30}	260
13	(France) Antoine Cossé	KTM	18^{26}	15^{29}	11^{30}	9^{32}	10^{31}	13^{28}	12^{29}	12^{29}					234
14	(France) Victor Krompholtz	Suzuki	25^{19}	26^{18}	26^{15}	29^{12}	27^{15}	23^{19}	27^{14}	27^{14}	20^{21}	18^{23}	21^{20}	22^{19}	209
15	(France) Enzo Gapaix	Honda	26^{18}	24^{20}	20^{21}	22^{19}			22^{19}	DNS	18^{23}	16^{25}	13^{28}	16^{25}	198
16	(France) Florian Pirard	Gas Gas	21^{23}	21^{23}	18^{23}	32^{9}	18^{24}	18^{24}	17^{24}	18^{23}					173
17	(France) Raffaël Blond	Beta	17^{27}	17^{27}	12^{29}	13^{28}	16^{26}	8^{33}							170
18	(France) Lucas Imbert	Honda			8^{33}	8^{33}	Ret	6^{35}	8^{33}	7^{34}					168
19	(France) Bryan Wlodarski	Yamaha			17^{24}	18^{23}			19^{22}	21^{20}	15^{26}	14^{27}			142
20	(France) Loan Bourroumana	Kawasaki	22^{22}	20^{24}	33^{8}	19^{22}	17^{25}	16^{26}							127
21	(Switzerland) Loris Freidig	Husqvarna					11^{30}	9^{32}	10^{31}	10^{31}					124
22	(France) Yannis Irsuti	Stark			10^{31}	12^{29}	14^{28}	28^{14}							102
23	(France) Maxime Renaux	Yamaha	1^{50}	1^{50}											100
24	(France) Romain Febvre	Kawasaki	2^{44}	2^{44}											88
25	(France) Dylan Brard	Beta					19^{23}	24^{17}	15^{26}	20^{21}					87
26	(France) Joey Nuques	Yamaha					15^{27}	DNS	11^{30}	14^{27}					84
27	(France) Nathan Laquiere	Yamaha					23^{19}	21^{21}	24^{17}	24^{17}					74
28	(Switzerland) Xylian Ramella	Honda			4^{38}	7^{34}									72
29	(France) Adrien Escoffier	Yamaha			5^{36}	5^{36}									72
30	(France) Cyril Courthieu	Honda					24^{18}	20^{22}	26^{15}	25^{16}					71
31	(France) Florian Gazaigne	Kawasaki					25^{17}	22^{20}	25^{16}	26^{15}					68
32	(Belgium) Florent Lambillon	Suzuki									9^{32}	9^{32}			64
33	(France) Romain Pape	Yamaha	14^{30}	11^{33}											63
34	(France) Maxime Jeanne	Yamaha											10^{31}	10^{31}	62
35	(France) Thomas Zoldos	Fantic									10^{31}	11^{30}			61
36	(Belgium) Mattéo Puffet	KTM					8^{33}	14^{27}							60
37	(France) Fabien Leroy	Fantic									12^{29}	10^{31}			60
38	(Switzerland) Arnaud Tonus	Yamaha					3^{40}	25^{18}							58
39	(Belgium) Mike Roose	Gas Gas									14^{27}	12^{29}			56
40	(France) Martin Outrequin	Yamaha											15^{26}	13^{28}	54
41	(France) Enzo Gregori Garrido	Kawasaki			13^{28}	15^{26}									54
42	(Belgium) Adrien Wagener	KTM									11^{30}	19^{22}			52
43	(France) Dorian Martinez	Suzuki	20^{24}	27^{17}	30^{11}	DNS									52
44	(France) Laurent Dohr	Yamaha											17^{24}	14^{27}	51
45	(France) Michaël Bridier	Gas Gas											14^{27}	17^{24}	51
46	(France) Alex Dietre	Yamaha			14^{27}	17^{24}									51
47	(France) Mathieu Letellier	Honda											16^{25}	15^{26}	51
48	(France) Fabien Fradet	KTM			15^{26}	16^{25}									51
49	(France) Toni Giorgessi	Beta							16^{25}	16^{25}					50
50	(France) Jules Almayrac	Yamaha	19^{25}	19^{25}											50
51	(France) Nicolas Leblanc	KTM											18^{23}	18^{23}	46
52	(France) Antoine François	Beta											19^{22}	20^{21}	43
53	(France) Raphaël Dauphinot	Triumph									19^{22}	20^{21}			43
54	(France) Brice Guerin	Honda			19^{22}	20^{21}									43
55	(France) Nicolas Aubin	Honda			9^{32}	31^{10}			DNS	DNS					42
56	(France) Tony Seignobos	KTM			16^{25}	24^{17}									42
57	(France) Benjamin Levallois	KTM											20^{21}	21^{20}	41
58	(France) Christopher Roquier	KTM											23^{18}	19^{22}	40
59	(Spain) Nil Bussot	Husqvarna							30^{11}	15^{26}					37
60	(France) Malween Jourdaine	Honda											22^{19}	23^{18}	37
61	(France) Theo Roussaly	Yamaha							29^{12}	17^{24}					36
62	(France) Benjamin Gerber	Husqvarna					21^{21}	27^{15}							36
63	(France) Enzo Da-Ré	Yamaha	27^{17}	25^{19}											36
64	(France) Enzo Di Guisto	Honda							23^{18}	23^{18}					36
65	(France) Shaun Vinel	Stark							20^{21}	29^{12}					33
66	(France) Jason Maggiolini	Yamaha			23^{18}	27^{14}									32
67	(France) Gregory Puech	Honda					26^{16}	26^{16}							32
68	(France) Sacha De Monmahou	Honda			25^{16}	26^{15}									31
69	(France) Mathis Reynier	Honda			28^{13}	25^{16}									29
70	(France) Oscar Ciret	Yamaha			27^{14}	28^{13}									27
71	(France) Anthony Platero	Kawasaki							28^{13}	28^{13}					26
72	(France) Kevin Tarallo	Kawasaki					DNS	17^{25}							25
73	(France) Maximin Benoit	Honda			29^{12}	30^{11}									23
	(Belgium) Tias Callens	Yamaha											DNS	DNS	0
Riders ineligible for championship points
	(Latvia) Pauls Jonass	Kawasaki	7	3											0
	(Netherlands) Calvin Vlaanderen	Yamaha	3	8											0
	(Belgium) Jago Geerts	Yamaha	8	6											0
	(Belgium) Jonas Salaets	Gas Gas					12	15							0
Pos	Rider	Bike	LCM (Occitania)		PLF (Provence-Alpes-Côte d'Azur)		CDL (Occitania)		GAT (Occitania)		PLO (Hauts-de-France)		RLP (Normandy)		Points

== Elite MX2 ==
=== Participants ===
Team	Constructor	No	Rider	Rounds
BUD Racing Kawasaki	Kawasaki	3	(Australia) Jake Cannon	All
BUD Racing Kawasaki	Kawasaki	29	(Spain) Francisco García	All
Stark Future	Stark	7	(United Kingdom) Eddie Wade	2–3
Monster Energy Yamaha Factory MX2 Team	Yamaha	9	(France) Thibault Benistant	1–2
Monster Energy Yamaha Factory MX2 Team	Yamaha	47	(Latvia) Kārlis Reišulis	1
Team TMX Competition	KTM	11	(France) Calvin Fonvieille	All
Team TMX Competition	Yamaha	389	(France) Jules Pietre	1–4
	Gas Gas	14	(France) Arnaud Aubin	1–4, 6
Team VHR Racing	Yamaha	17	(France) Tom Brunet	1–4, 6
Team ML Motorsport	KTM	22	(France) Mickaël Lamarque	1, 3
Team Race Engine Diforte	Kawasaki	26	(France) Kylian Maallem	1–3
737 Performance KTM	KTM	41	(France) Nicolas Duhamel	1–4
737 Performance KTM	KTM	172	(France) Mathys Boisramé	All
Team New Bike Yamaha	Yamaha	55	(France) Mathis Barthez	1
Aruba.it Ducati Factory MX Team	Ducati	71	(Italy) Alessandro Lupino	6
	Yamaha	77	(France) Baptiste Bordes	3–4
Team FR25	Honda	88	(France) Jean-Lino Broussolle	All
Team Ride Innovation Development	Kawasaki	95	(France) Enzo Casat	1–4
KTM Nantes	KTM	101	(France) Liam Bruneau	1–4
	Yamaha	104	(France) Ethan Molard	5
KMR Treize	KTM	107	(France) Arnaud Colson	All
KMR Treize	KTM	188	(France) Ilyes Ortiz	1–5
Chave Motos/Honda Moto France	Honda	113	(France) Enzo Dubois	2–3
	Honda	114	(France) Aurelien Baillif	2–4
MX Team GH125	KTM	125	(France) Guillaume Haudebault	All
	Husqvarna	126	(France) Loïc Kiffer	2
	Yamaha	130	(France) Leo Lecuyer	6
Motoland KTM	KTM	133	(France) Tom Caneele	5
	KTM	134	(France) Benjamin Fechter	2, 6
Yamaha Spirit Motor Aix	Yamaha	151	(France) Lévano Biondi	2–3
MS Motorsport	Fantic	156	(France) Maxime Sot	4
Hot Motorbike KTM	KTM	160	(Belgium) Harry Seel	5
	Yamaha	161	(France) Loukas Poulain	6
	Kawasaki	187	(France) Tom Bertolotto	1–2
	Husqvarna	195	(France) Lois Carlier	2, 6
HRS Suspension/IPONE/MotoLand Amiens	KTM	199	(France) Enzo Lefebvre	6
Team AG Motorsport	Honda	205	(France) Evan Lhommedé	1
	KTM	211	(France) Kevin Vandeleene	1–4
	Husqvarna	213	(France) Andrea Bonnamy	2
	Honda	214	(France) Matheo Barbarin	2
	Kawasaki	226	(France) Gabin Bounoir	2
ConvX Team	Husqvarna	240	(France) Johan Briand	1
Team 2B CBO	Honda	256	(France) Basile Pigois	2–4
Motoland Amiens	Yamaha	268	(France) Thibault Maupin	All
Red Bull KTM Factory Racing	KTM	280	(France) Marc-Antoine Rossi	6
Rockstar Energy MRK Racing Team	KTM	288	(France) Noam Jayal	2
	Yamaha	290	(France) Alexis Mongreville	6
	Gas Gas	291	(France) Jimmy van Walleghem	6
Poulain XX Club Racing	Yamaha	300	(France) Alex Poulain d'Andecy	2
Atelier JQM 14	Kawasaki	306	(France) Marvyn Andrin	6
Kawasaki Racing Team MX2	Kawasaki	317	(France) Mathis Valin	1
Subra Motos	Husqvarna	335	(France) Enzo Polias	2, 4
	Honda	348	(France) Maxim Sonnerat	1–3
	KTM	360	(France) Hugo Muzard	6
	Kawasaki	368	(France) Tom Hipolito	1
Honda Moto France/Chave Motos	Honda	371	(France) Paolo Maschio	All
Team Four One One	Suzuki	411	(France) Nicolas Dercourt	5
	Honda	418	(France) Oscar Condemine	2
	Triumph	420	(France) Pierre Lozzi	2
VHR VRT Yamaha Official EMX250 Team	Yamaha	432	(Netherlands) Ivano van Erp	1, 6
VHR VRT Yamaha Official EMX250 Team	Yamaha	772	(Latvia) Jānis Reišulis	1, 6
	Kawasaki	444	(France) Pierre Micallef	2
Yamaha Motor France	Yamaha	446	(France) Adrien Petit	1–2
	KTM	463	(France) Tom Baudaux	5
2b Moto Beta	Beta	471	(France) Elwan van de Wouw	1–2
	KTM	494	(France) Ruben Gestas	1
Triumph Avignon	Triumph	496	(France) Romain Seranon	2
	KTM	505	(France) Dorian Koch	2
AGMX Honda	Honda	510	(Switzerland) Luca Diserens	3
	Gas Gas	512	(Belgium) Uwe De Waele	5
	Kawasaki	514	(France) Dylan Bucchianeri-Armando	2
Triumph Ambutrix/Triumph France	Triumph	520	(France) Jimmy Clochet	All
	Kawasaki	521	(France) Alexandre Lhomme	2
	Honda	556	(France) Lenny Alleaume	5–6
	Yamaha	558	(France) Enzo Audouy-Schneider	3
Team Laurent Services	Husqvarna	571	(France) Matéo Bouly	6
Gabriel SS24 KTM Factory Junior Team	KTM	574	(Netherlands) Gyan Doensen	1
Kuttler Motos	KTM	575	(France) Kevan Schillinger	2–3
	Kawasaki	606	(France) Killian Vincent	1
	Husqvarna	612	(France) Thibaud Dauzac	3–4
	Gas Gas	628	(France) Tom Lefeez	5
	KTM	639	(France) Andrea Deldossi	All
Team Cap Endurance	KTM	712	(France) Pierrick Castan	All
Pro-Stage	Yamaha	743	(France) Jules Langue	5
DVS Junior Racing	TM	744	(France) Saad Soulimani	1–3, 5
	Yamaha	755	(France) Steve Fossey	6
Doumenq Motos	Suzuki	761	(France) Marvyn Vigny	3
	KTM	782	(France) Timéo Leloup	6
	KTM	789	(France) Mathis Polart	5
	Husqvarna	802	(France) Benjamin Gerber	2, 4
Afil Services	KTM	828	(Belgium) Tom Dukerts	5
Triumph Lanester	Triumph	838	(France) Raphaël Dauphinot	1–2
	Kawasaki	857	(France) Hugo Vauthier	1–2
	KTM	866	(France) Nicolas Bertrand	2
Design Auto Madagascar	KTM	877	(Madagascar) Ranty Ernest	2
	KTM	891	(France) Jeremy Gritti	1
Team FGR/LaTroch	KTM	899	(France) Jules Gourribon	4
	Yamaha	910	(France) Theo Marie	6
	Husqvarna	915	(France) Theo Feral	3
Suttel Group/ADNMoto30/Moto Park Montpellier	Honda	938	(France) Mathias Mortreuil	2–4
	KTM	975	(France) Pierre Dricot	4

=== Riders Championship ===
Points are awarded to riders per race in the following format:

Place	1	2	3	4	5	6	7	8	9	10	11	12	13	14	15	16	17	18	19	20	21	22	23	24	25	26	27	28	29	30	31	32	33	34	35	36	37	38	39	40+
Points	50	44	40	38	36	35	34	33	32	31	30	29	28	27	26	25	24	23	22	21	20	19	18	17	16	15	14	13	12	11	10	9	8	7	6	5	4	3	2	1

Pos	Rider	Bike	LCM (Occitania)		PLF (Provence-Alpes-Côte d'Azur)		CDL (Occitania)		GAT (Occitania)		PLO (Hauts-de-France)		RLP (Normandy)		Points
1	(France) Mathys Boisramé	KTM	11^{31}	6^{36}	4^{38}	4^{38}	2^{44}	2^{44}	2^{44}	1^{50}	1^{50}	2^{44}	3^{40}	6^{36}	495
2	(Spain) Francisco García	Kawasaki	5^{38}	5^{38}	6^{35}	1^{50}	4^{38}	3^{40}	4^{38}	2^{44}	8^{33}	1^{50}	2^{44}	5^{38}	486
3	(France) Calvin Fonvieille	KTM	16^{27}	17^{26}	10^{31}	5^{36}	1^{50}	1^{50}	1^{50}	5^{36}	4^{38}	4^{38}	8^{34}	9^{33}	449
4	(France) Jimmy Clochet	Triumph	12^{30}	12^{30}	11^{30}	7^{34}	8^{33}	7^{34}	3^{40}	6^{35}	2^{44}	8^{33}	12^{30}	8^{34}	407
5	(Australia) Jake Cannon	Kawasaki	7^{35}	7^{35}	9^{32}	38^{3}	6^{35}	4^{38}	5^{36}	3^{40}	3^{40}	3^{40}	6^{36}	7^{35}	405
6	(France) Thibault Maupin	Yamaha	8^{34}	11^{31}	18^{23}	3^{40}	5^{36}	6^{35}	8^{33}	10^{31}	24^{17}	10^{31}	9^{33}	10^{32}	376
7	(France) Arnaud Colson	KTM	20^{23}	15^{27}	8^{33}	12^{29}	9^{32}	13^{28}	6^{35}	13^{28}	5^{36}	6^{35}	11^{31}	11^{31}	368
8	(France) Paolo Maschio	Honda	28^{15}	24^{19}	12^{29}	10^{31}	11^{30}	12^{29}	12^{29}	9^{32}	15^{26}	7^{34}	13^{29}	14^{28}	331
9	(France) Andrea Deldossi	KTM	18^{25}	36^{7}	13^{28}	11^{30}	13^{28}	15^{26}	7^{34}	11^{30}	9^{32}	9^{32}	15^{27}	15^{27}	319
10	(France) Arnaud Aubin	Gas Gas	9^{33}	8^{34}	3^{40}	29^{12}	3^{40}	11^{30}	9^{32}	4^{38}			14^{28}	13^{29}	316
11	(France) Tom Brunet	Yamaha	14^{29}	10^{32}	15^{26}	32^{9}	7^{34}	14^{27}	19^{22}	14^{27}			10^{32}	12^{30}	268
12	(France) Jean-Lino Broussolle	Honda	29^{14}	26^{17}	26^{15}	33^{8}	24^{17}	19^{22}	13^{28}	17^{24}	12^{29}	13^{28}	16^{26}	16^{26}	254
13	(France) Jules Pietre	Yamaha	10^{32}	14^{28}	5^{36}	6^{35}	14^{27}	5^{36}	15^{26}	8^{33}					253
14	(France) Pierrick Castan	KTM	23^{20}	25^{18}	14^{27}	16^{25}	10^{31}	17^{24}	21^{20}	15^{26}	11^{30}	12^{29}	DNS	DNS	250
15	(France) Ilyes Ortiz	KTM	25^{18}	21^{22}	24^{17}	21^{20}	19^{22}	28^{13}	10^{31}	12^{29}	7^{34}	11^{30}			236
16	(France) Saad Soulimani	TM	36^{7}	13^{29}	7^{34}	8^{33}	16^{25}	9^{32}			6^{35}	5^{36}			231
17	(France) Liam Bruneau	KTM	26^{17}	19^{24}	23^{18}	13^{28}	12^{29}	8^{33}	18^{23}	21^{20}					192
18	(France) Thibault Benistant	Yamaha	2^{44}	2^{44}	1^{50}	2^{44}									182
19	(Latvia) Jānis Reišulis	Yamaha	3^{40}	3^{40}									1^{50}	1^{50}	180
20	(France) Guillaume Haudebault	KTM	33^{10}	33^{10}	DNQ	DNQ	28^{13}	25^{16}	26^{15}	24^{17}	16^{25}	18^{23}	17^{25}	17^{25}	179
21	(France) Adrien Petit	Yamaha	6^{36}	9^{33}	2^{44}	22^{19}									132
22	(France) Kylian Maallem	Kawasaki	19^{24}	18^{25}	19^{22}	25^{16}	17^{24}	20^{21}							132
23	(France) Nicolas Duhamel	KTM	24^{19}	DNS	DNS	DNS	18^{23}	16^{25}	11^{30}	7^{34}					131
24	(France) Mathis Valin	Kawasaki	1^{50}	1^{50}											100
25	(France) Mickaël Lamarque	KTM	15^{28}	20^{23}			15^{26}	18^{23}							100
26	(France) Maxim Sonnerat	Honda	27^{16}	32^{11}	20^{21}	24^{17}	21^{20}	26^{15}							100
27	(France) Basile Pigois	Honda			36^{5}	35^{6}	20^{21}	21^{20}	16^{25}	20^{21}					98
28	(Netherlands) Ivano van Erp	Yamaha	21^{22}	DNS									7^{35}	3^{40}	97
29	(France) Enzo Casat	Kawasaki	37^{6}	35^{8}	30^{11}	37^{4}	27^{14}	23^{18}	25^{16}	27^{14}					91
30	(United Kingdom) Eddie Wade	Stark			38^{3}	9^{32}	22^{19}	10^{31}							85
31	(France) Marc-Antoine Rossi	KTM											4^{38}	2^{44}	82
32	(France) Enzo Polias	Husqvarna			16^{25}	30^{11}			20^{21}	18^{23}					80
33	(France) Baptiste Bordes	Yamaha					26^{15}	22^{19}	17^{24}	19^{22}					80
34	(France) Lenny Alleaume	Honda									22^{19}	21^{20}	26^{16}	19^{23}	78
35	(France) Enzo Dubois	Honda			17^{24}	14^{27}	23^{18}	34^{7}							76
36	(France) Hugo Vauthier	Kawasaki	22^{21}	29^{14}	27^{14}	18^{23}									72
37	(France) Lois Carlier	Honda			22^{19}	17^{24}							30^{12}	29^{13}	68
38	(France) Kévan Schillinger	KTM			28^{13}	19^{22}	25^{16}	24^{17}							68
39	(France) Thibaud Dauzac	Husqvarna					30^{11}	29^{12}	23^{18}	22^{19}					60
40	(France) Kevin Vandeleene	KTM	DNQ	DNQ	DNQ	DNQ	29^{12}	30^{11}	24^{17}	25^{16}					56
41	(France) Tom Caneele	KTM									13^{28}	14^{27}			55
42	(France) Tom Lefeez	Honda									14^{27}	16^{25}			52
43	(France) Jules Gourribon	KTM							14^{27}	16^{25}					52
44	(Belgium) Harry Seel	KTM									10^{31}	22^{19}			50
45	(France) Nicolas Dercourt	Suzuki									19^{22}	15^{26}			48
46	(France) Mathis Barthez	Yamaha	17^{26}	22^{21}											47
47	(France) Mathis Polart	KTM									18^{23}	17^{24}			47
48	(France) Dorian Koch	KTM			21^{20}	15^{26}									46
49	(France) Leo Lecuyer	Yamaha											20^{22}	18^{24}	46
50	(France) Jules Langue	Yamaha									17^{24}	19^{22}			46
51	(France) Matéo Bouly	Husqvarna											18^{24}	24^{18}	42
52	(France) Lévano Biondi	Yamaha			29^{12}	31^{10}	35^{6}	27^{14}							42
53	(France) Ethan Molard	Yamaha									21^{20}	20^{21}			41
54	(France) Alexis Mongreville	Yamaha											24^{18}	20^{22}	40
55	(France) Marvyn Andrin	Kawasaki											21^{21}	23^{19}	40
56	(France) Theo Marie	Yamaha											25^{17}	21^{21}	38
57	(France) Romain Seranon	Triumph			25^{16}	20^{21}									37
58	(France) Enzo Lefebvre	KTM											19^{23}	30^{12}	35
59	(France) Jimmy van Walleghem	Gas Gas											23^{19}	26^{16}	35
60	(France) Mathias Mortreuil	Gas Gas			DNQ	DNQ	32^{9}	DNS	29^{12}	28^{13}					34
61	(France) Loukas Poulain	Yamaha											29^{13}	22^{20}	33
62	(France) Killian Vincent	Kawasaki	31^{12}	23^{20}											32
63	(France) Benjamin Gerber	Husqvarna			DNQ	DNQ			27^{14}	23^{18}					32
64	(France) Hugo Muzard	KTM											27^{15}	25^{17}	32
65	(France) Timéo Leloup	KTM											28^{14}	27^{15}	29
66	(France) Pierre Dricot	KTM							28^{13}	26^{15}					28
67	(France) Ruben Gestas	KTM	30^{13}	28^{15}											28
68	(France) Oscar Condemine	Honda			32^{9}	23^{18}									27
69	(France) Aurelien Baillif	Honda			DNQ	DNQ	33^{8}	33^{8}	30^{11}	DNS					27
70	(France) Steve Fossey	Yamaha											31^{11}	28^{14}	25
71	(France) Jeremy Gritti	KTM	35^{8}	27^{16}											24
72	(France) Alexandre Lhomme	Kawasaki			31^{10}	27^{14}									24
73	(France) Evan Lhommedé	Honda	32^{11}	30^{13}											24
74	(France) Pierre Lozzi	Triumph			34^{7}	26^{15}									22
75	(Belgium) Uwe De Waele	Gas Gas									20^{21}	Ret			21
76	(France) Benjamin Fechter	KTM			DNQ	DNQ							22^{20}	DNS	20
77	(France) Enzo Audouy-Schneider	Yamaha					31^{10}	31^{10}							20
78	(France) Maxime Sot	Fantic							22^{19}	DNS					19
79	(Belgium) Tom Dukerts	KTM									23^{18}	DNS			18
80	(France) Tom Bertolotto	Kawasaki	34^{9}	34^{9}	DNQ	DNQ									18
81	(France) Alex Poulain d'Andecy	Yamaha			37^{4}	28^{13}									17
82	(France) Elwan van de Wouw	Beta	38^{5}	31^{12}	DNS	DNS									17
83	(Switzerland) Luca Diserens	Honda					34^{7}	32^{9}							16
84	(France) Nicolas Bertrand	KTM			33^{8}	36^{5}									13
85	(France) Noam Jayal	Stark			35^{6}	34^{7}									13
86	(France) Marvyn Vigny	Suzuki					36^{5}	DNS							5
87	(France) Theo Feral	Husqvarna					37^{4}	DNS							4
88	(France) Raphaël Dauphinot	Triumph	39^{4}	DNS	DNQ	DNQ									4
89	(France) Johan Briand	Husqvarna	40^{3}	DNS											3
	(France) Tom Baudaux	KTM									DNS	DNS			0
	(France) Tom Hipolito	Kawasaki	DNQ	DNQ											0
	(Madagascar) Ranty Ernest	KTM			DNQ	DNQ									0
	(France) Andrea Bonnamy	Husqvarna			DNQ	DNQ									0
	(France) Loïc Kiffer	Husqvarna			DNQ	DNQ									0
	(France) Matheo Barbarin	Honda			DNQ	DNQ									0
	(France) Pierre Micallef	Kawasaki			DNQ	DNQ									0
	(France) Gabin Bounoir	Kawasaki			DNQ	DNQ									0
	(France) Dylan Bucchianeri-Armando	Kawasaki			DNQ	DNQ									0
Riders ineligible for championship points
	(Latvia) Kārlis Reišulis	Yamaha	4	4											0
	(Italy) Alessandro Lupino	Ducati											5	4	0
	(Netherlands) Gyan Doensen	KTM	13	16											0
Pos	Rider	Bike	LCM (Occitania)		PLF (Provence-Alpes-Côte d'Azur)		CDL (Occitania)		GAT (Occitania)		PLO (Hauts-de-France)		RLP (Normandy)		Points
