= Kevin Horgmo =

Norwegian motocross racer

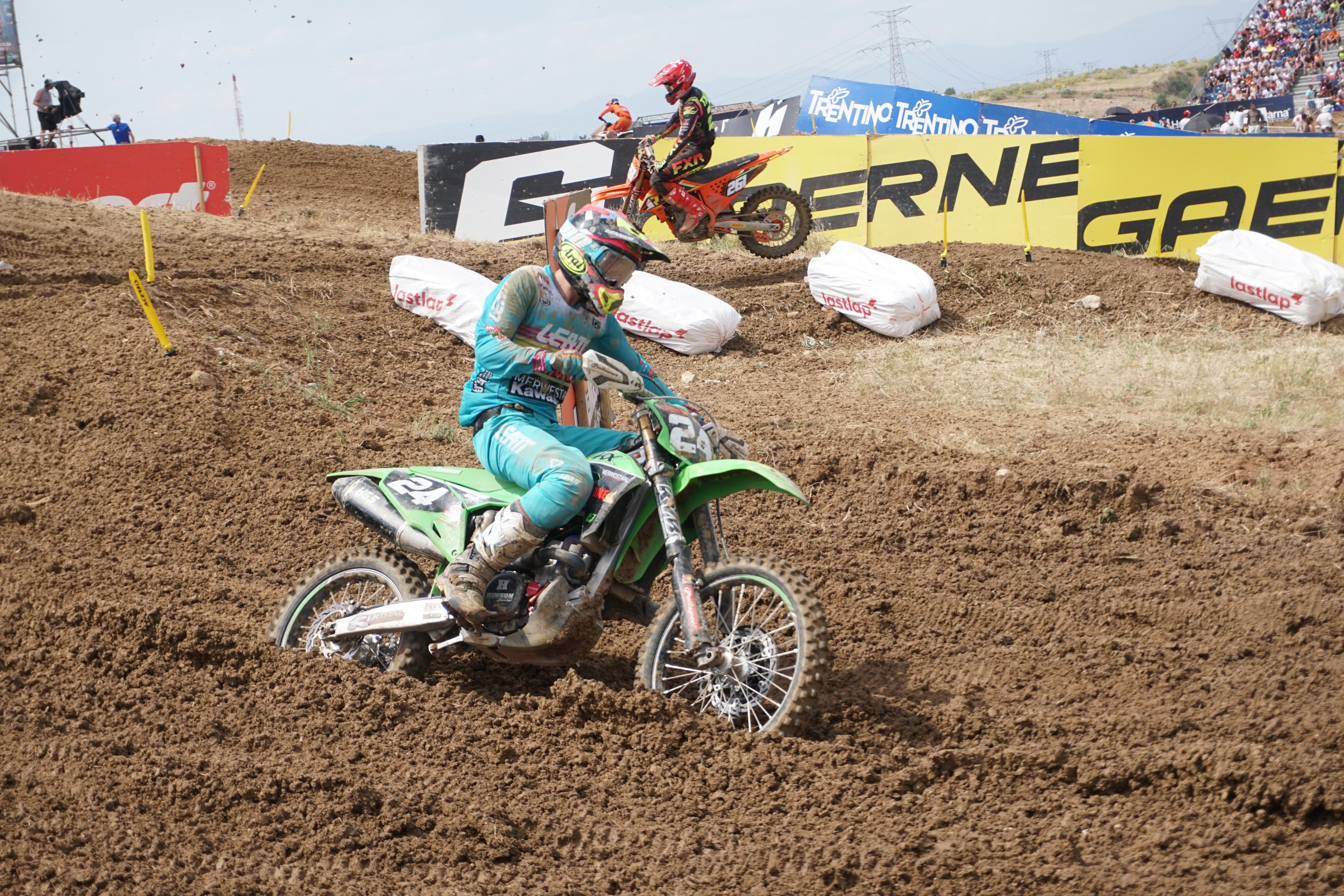
- Nationality: Norwegian
- Born: 23 September 2000 (age 26); Åmot Municipality, Norway
- Current team: Team Ship to Cycle Honda Motoblouz SR
- Bike number: 24

Kevin Horgmo (born 23 September 2000) is a Norwegian professional motocross racer. He has been competing in the FIM Motocross World Championship since 2019. In 2023, Horgmo won his first race at World Championship-level in the MX2 class.

Horgmo has achieved success racing at international level across Europe and the rest of the world. He has represented Norway at the Motocross des Nations several times and finished runner-up in the 2021 European Motocross Championship.

== Career ==
=== Junior career ===
Horgmo spent much of his junior career under the stewardship of former Grand Prix rider Kenneth Gundersen. He claimed his first national title in 2013 in the 85 class and in addition competed in the European Motocross Championship. In 2014, he made his debut in the FIM Motocross Junior World Championship in the 85cc class, picking up three points.

Horgmo moved into the EMX125 class of the European Motocross Championship in 2015. After scoring points sporadically throughout the season, Horgmo was able to secure his first top-ten race finish at the last round of the season, with seventh in race two. In the same season, he was able to win the 125 national championships of both Norway and Sweden. In 2016, Horgmo began to move himself up the ranks of the EMX125 championship as the season progressed, including scoring a second position in race two in Great Britain. He picked up an injury at the following round which saw him end the season on the side-lines.

2017 would be Horgmo's last season on a 125 and saw him ride for the CreyMert Racing KTM team. This would be a standout season for Horgmo, where he picked up three overall podiums in the EMX125 class of the 2017 European Motocross Championship, which included his first overall win at the French round. In addition to this, Horgmo was able to be one of the leading competitors in that years FIM Junior World Championship, where a second place in race two was enough for him to take home the bronze medal. After these performances, he was called up to ride for Norway at the 2017 Motocross des Nations, where the country was unable to qualify for the main races.

=== 250 career ===
Horgmo extended his contract with the CreyMert KTM team for 2018 and 2019 seasons. The 2018 European Motocross Championship would be his first in the EMX250 class. After two-second place moto finishes throughout the season, Horgmo ended the campaign by finishing second overall at the final round at Assen, behind Jett Lawrence. Tenth in the final standings was coupled with him becoming Norwegian Champion in the MX2 class.

In the 2019 European Motocross Championship, Horgmo had a strong start in EMX250, with two top-three race finishes in the first two rounds. He then missed the next three rounds due to a broken jaw sustained in a Dutch Masters of Motocross event. Once he recovered, he made his debut in the MX2 class of the 2019 FIM Motocross World Championship in Czech Republic, scoring a tenth place in the second race. He then returned to the EMX250 class in Belgium, finishing second overall before choosing to miss the last round to make his second MX2 world championship start in Sweden. Horgmo rode one final Grand Prix in 2019, in Turkey, riding this time for the Marchetti Racing KTM team. Following this, he made his second appearance for his country at the 2019 Motocross des Nations. The Norwegian team had one of their best performances on record, finishing 12th overall, with Horgmo finishing fourth best MX2 rider in the main races.

After guesting with them at the end of 2019, Horgmo signed for Marchetti Racing KTM for his full-time MX2 World Championship debut in 2020. It proved to be a tough season for Horgmo, where he struggled to adapt to the team and picked up three top-ten races finishes on the way to 18th in the final standings. After splitting with the Marchetti team, he took up the option to drop back into the EMX250 class of the European Championship for 2021 European Motocross Championship. This would prove to be Horgmo's most successful European Championship season, with him battling eventual champion Nicholas Lapucci from the first round. Six overall podiums, three race wins and two overall wins were achieved along the way finishing in the runner-up spot. In addition, he made three wildcard appearances in the MX2 class of the 2021 FIM Motocross World Championship, with a best race finish of 12th.

After such a strong season, Horgmo signed for the F&H Kawasaki team for a full-time return to the MX2 class in the 2022 FIM Motocross World Championship. He carried his good form into the new World Championship season, finishing consistently in the top-ten across the first three rounds, before getting his first race top-three in the second race at the Portuguese round. Two rounds later, he secured his first overall podium by finishing second overall in Latvia. After finishing fourth in the final standings, Horgmo made his fourth appearance for Norway at the 2022 Motocross des Nations, helping his country finish thirteenth. 2023 would be Horgmo's last season in the MX2 World Championship due to the under-23 rule. He started the season strongly with a second place in race two in Argentina. Despite consistently finishing in the top-ten, he struggled to push up as high as he had in the previous season until the Swedish round where he was able to take the qualifying race win. Two rounds later in Turkey, he was able to take his first World Championship race win and secure his second ever overall podium. After a final championship placing of seventh, Horgmo made his fourth appearance for Norway at the Motocross des Nations.

=== 450 career ===
Horgmo signed for the Team Ship to Cycle Honda Motoblouz SR squad to make his MXGP class debut in the 2024 FIM Motocross World Championship. In the competitive MXGP class, Horgmo consistently finished in the top-ten throughout the season, battling with factory riders and achieving a best overall result of sixth at the first Indonesian round. Despite not racing at the final round due to an illness, Horgmo finished eighth in the final standings, one place ahead of his teammate Valentin Guillod. Alongside MXGP, he raced the 2024 French Elite Motocross Championship, finishing fourth in the final Elite-MX1 standings and taking a single race win. At the end of the season, Horgmo represented Norway at the 2024 Motocross des Nations, where the team finished 17th.

Horgmo's 2025 FIM Motocross World Championship campaign was cut short due to crashes that resulted in thumb and shoulder surgeries. Across the 11 rounds he did compete in, he had a best overall result of fifth at the Sardinian round. Prior to this, Horgmo was able to win the Elite MX1 class title in the 2025 French Elite Motocross Championship, winning three overall rounds and six race wins across the six rounds series. After a long time out recovering from the previous seasons injuries and struggling with illnesses, Horgmo faced challenges during the early part of the 2026 FIM Motocross World Championship. As the year wore on, he recorded several top-ten overall finishes, with seventh overall in Great Britain being the high watermark. At the Turkish round, the SR Honda team let Horgmo know he would not be retained for the following season and the week after in China a scaphoid injury ended his year. Horgmo was unable to defend his title in the 2026 French Elite Motocross Championship, finishing as runner-up behind Maxime Desprey, with a single overall win and two race wins across the six rounds.

== Honours ==
FIM Motocross Junior World Championship

- 125cc: 2017 (bronze)

French Elite Motocross Championship

- Elite MX1: 2025 (gold) , 2026 (silver)

European Motocross Championship

- EMX250: 2021 (silver)

Norwegian Motocross Championship

- MX2: 2018 (gold)
- 125: 2015 (gold)
- 85: 2013 (gold)

Swedish Motocross Championship

- 125: 2015 (gold)

== Career statistics ==
=== Motocross des Nations ===
Year	Location	Nation	Class	Teammates	Team Overall	Individual Overall
2017	(United Kingdom) Matterley Basin	NOR	MX2	Hakon Engan Karlsen; Sander Agard-Michelsen	24th	N/A
2019	(Netherlands) Assen	NOR	MX2	Håkon Fredriksen; Henrik Wahl	12th	4th
2022	(United States) Red Bud	NOR	MX2	Cornelius Tøndel; Håkon Østerhagen	13th	14th
2023	(France) Ernée	NOR	MX2	Cornelius Tøndel; Håkon Fredriksen	16th	15th
2024	(United Kingdom) Matterley Basin	NOR	MXGP	Sander Agard-Michelsen; Cornelius Tøndel	17th	15th

=== FIM Motocross World Championship ===
==== By season ====
Season	Class	Number	Motorcycle	Team	Race	Race Wins	Overall Wins	Race Top-3	Overall Podium	Pts	Plcd
2019	MX2	240	KTM	CreyMert Racing KTM	4	0	0	0	0	23	35th
2019	MX2	240	KTM	Marchetti Racing Team KTM	2	0	0	0	0	23	35th
2020	MX2	240	KTM	Marchetti Racing Team KTM	31	0	0	0	0	137	18th
2021	MX2	240	Gas Gas	SM Action GasGas Racing Team Yuasa Battery	6	0	0	0	0	26	28th
2022	MX2	24	Kawasaki	F&H Kawasaki Racing Team	36	0	0	4	1	527	4th
2023	MX2	24	Kawasaki	F&H Kawasaki MX2 Racing Team	36	1	0	3	1	565	7th
2024	MXGP	24	Honda	Team Ship to Cycle Honda Motoblouz SR	38	0	0	0	0	428	8th
2025	MXGP	24	Honda	Team Honda Motoblouz SR Motul	21	0	0	0	0	243	18th
2026	MXGP	24	Honda	Team Honda Motoblouz SR Motul	34	0	0	0	0	303	13th
Total					208	1	0	7	2	2252	
