= Frotey-lès-Vesoul =

- Commune
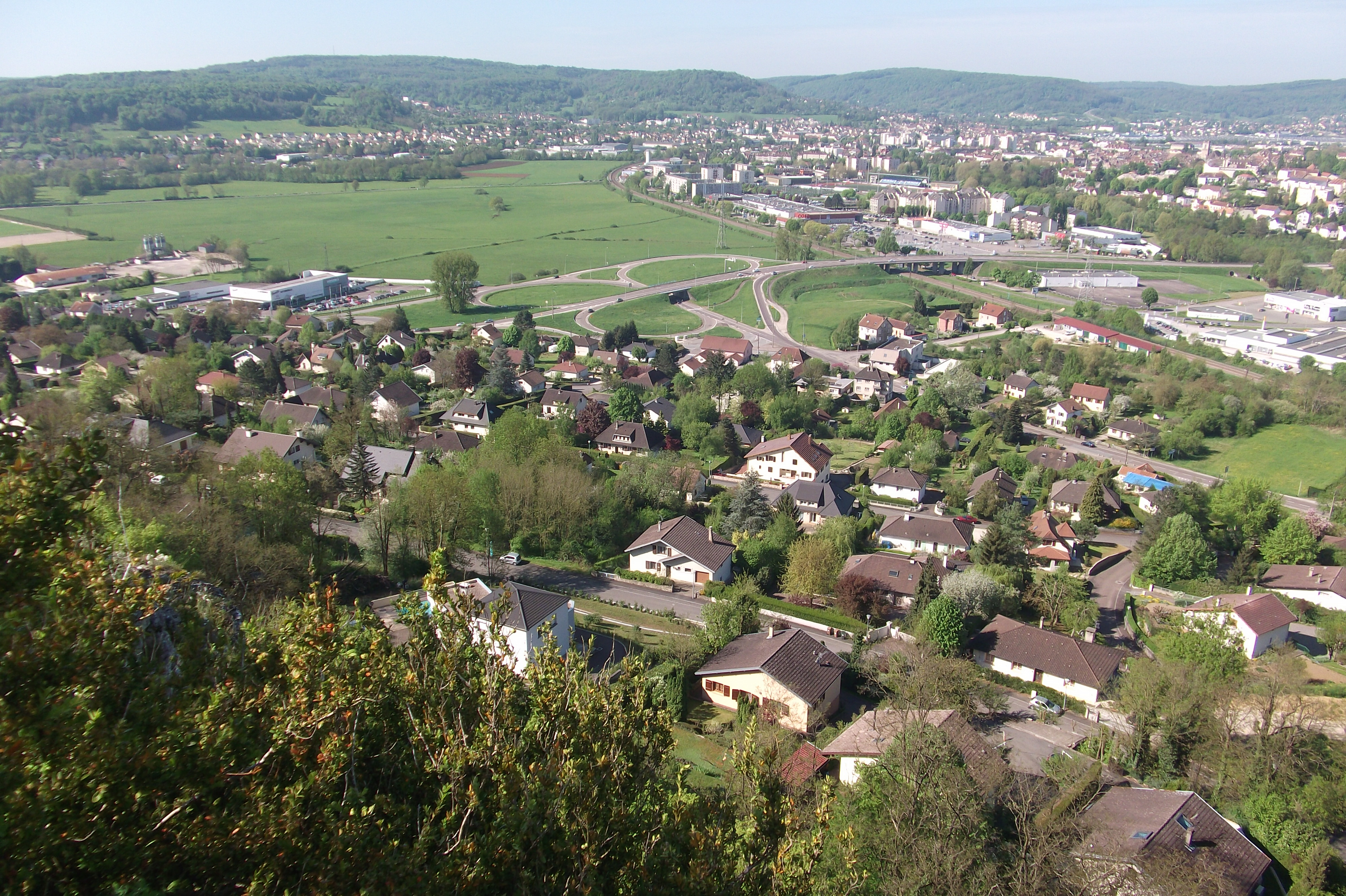
- A general view of Frotey-lès-Vesoul
- Location of Frotey-lès-Vesoul
- Location within France Location within Bourgogne-Franche-Comté
- Coordinates: 47°37′22″N 6°11′10″E
- Country: France
- Region: Bourgogne-Franche-Comté
- Department: Haute-Saône
- Arrondissement: Vesoul
- Canton: Vesoul-2
- Intercommunality: CA Vesoul

Government
  - Mayor (2020–2026): Christophe Tary
- Area^{1}: 7.63 km^{2} (2.95 sq mi)
- Highest elevation: 374 m (1,227 ft)
- Lowest elevation: 218 m (715 ft)
- Population (2023): 1,354
  - Density: 177/km^{2} (460/sq mi)
- Time zone: UTC+01:00 (CET)
  - Summer (DST): UTC+02:00 (CEST)
- INSEE/Postal code: 70261 /70000
- ^{1} French Land Register data, which excludes lakes, ponds, glaciers > 1 km^{2} (0.386 sq mi or 247 acres) and river estuaries.

Frotey-lès-Vesoul (French pronunciation: [fʁɔtɛ lɛ vəzul], literally Frotey near Vesoul) is a commune in the Haute-Saône department in the region of Bourgogne-Franche-Comté in eastern France.

The town is located near Vesoul.

== See also ==
- Communes of the Haute-Saône department
- Communauté d'agglomération de Vesoul
- Arrondissement of Vesoul
