= Fantic Motor =

Italian motorcycle manufacturer

- Founded: 1968; 58 years ago
- Founder: Mario Agrati; Henry Keppel-Hesselink
- Headquarters: Casier, Italy
- Products: motorcycles
- Parent: VeNetWork
- Subsidiaries: Motori Minarelli; Bottecchia
- Website: http://www.fanticmotor.it/

Fantic Motor is an Italian motorcycle manufacturer founded in 1968 by Mario Agrati and Henry Keppel-Hesselink.

== History ==
Previous logo

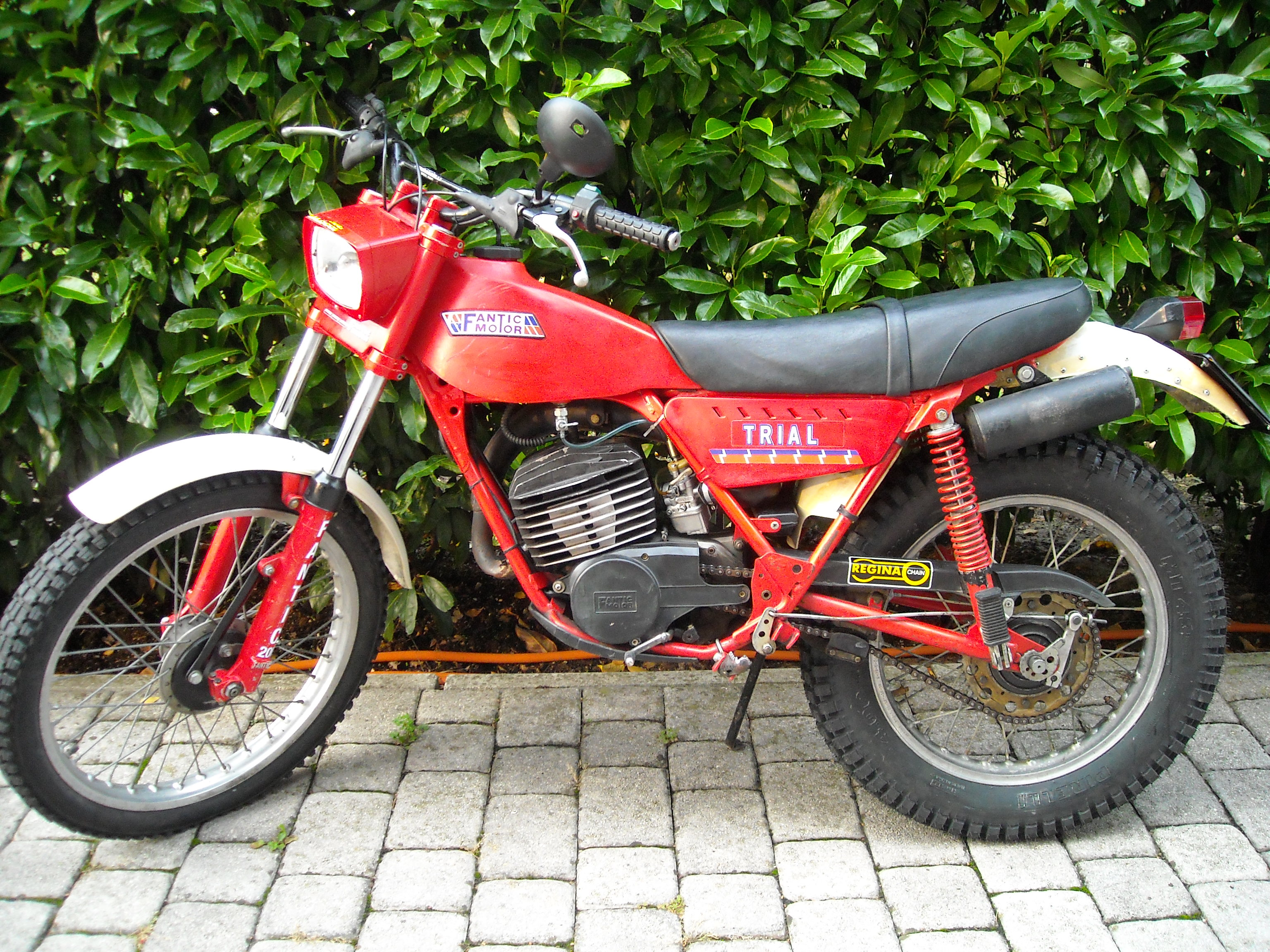
1982 Fantic Motor Trial 200

Fantic Motor began in 1968 by manufacturing and exporting enduro motorcycles, mini-bikes and go-karts. Today they continue in the same genre, with the descriptions changed to the modern categories of dual-sport and motard. In 2016 they returned to the US market as Fantic USA Inc. In 2015 Fantic launched new models of electric bikes, called the Fat Bike. and has now a complete line of eMTB and commuter electric bikes.

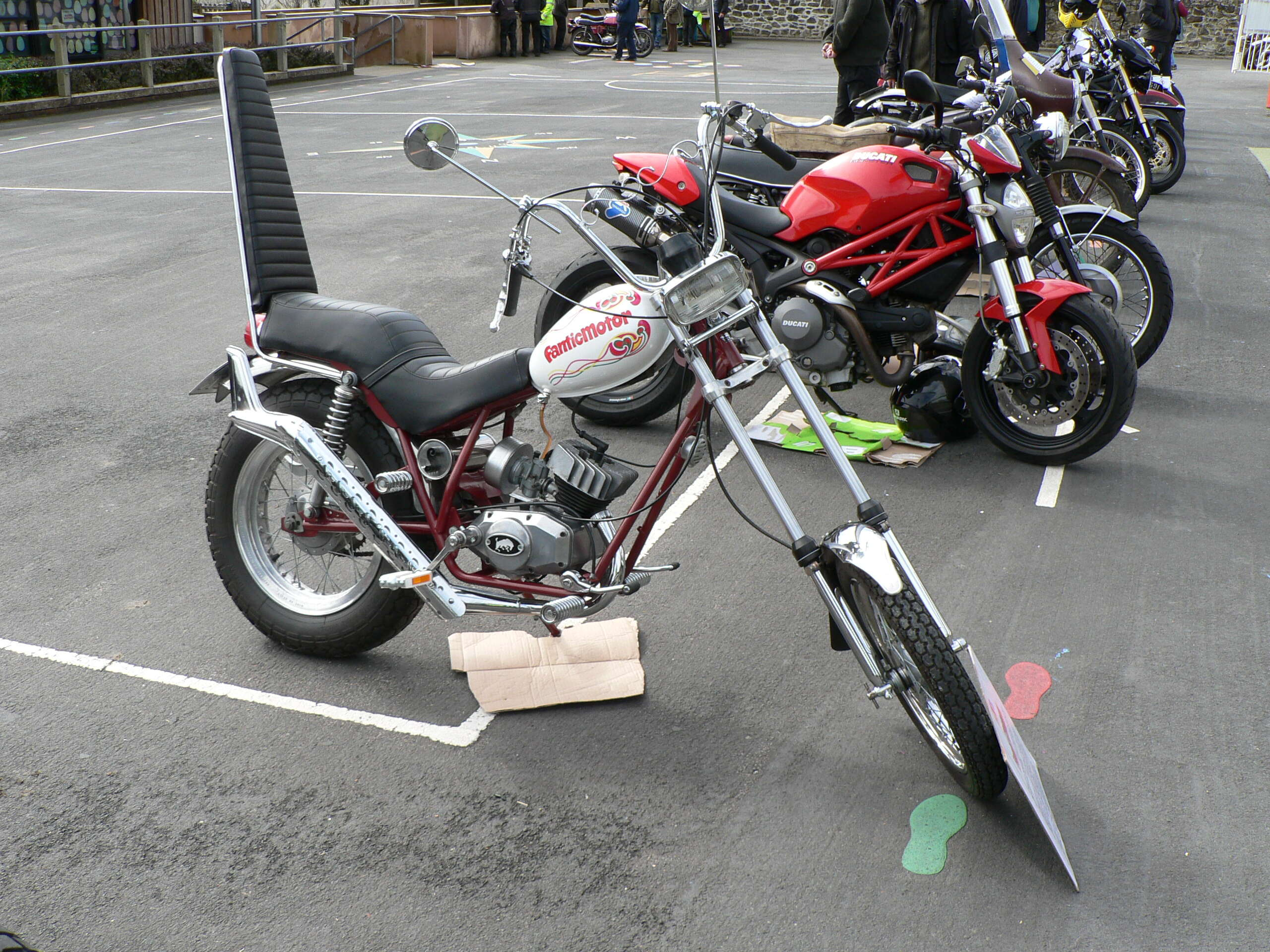
1972 Fantic Chopper Moped

Fantic began exporting to the United Kingdom in 1972, as part of a wave of manufacturers who took advantage of "sixteener laws", legislation that forbade sixteen-year-old motorcyclists from riding motorcycles up to 250 cc, as they had been used to. As a result, European and Japanese manufacturers exported their sporty and lightweight below-50cc engines, which had been common in Europe, to England also. Fantic produced a "sensational chopper moped" and a TI ("Tourismo Internazionale)," both of which became very popular quickly, with the reputation of being some of the fastest mopeds on the market, going as fast as 70 mph.

From the 1970s until the early 1980s, Fantic produced a series of 50cc mopeds called Fantic Motor Lei. The Fantic Motor motorcycles were first imported into the U.K. in 1972 by Barron Eurotrade Ltd whose headquarters were based at 51 High Street Hornchurch, Essex. The idea of forming the company and importing the Fantic came about because one of the founders saw the 50cc 'Chopper' model publicised in an American motorcycle magazine that his brother in law sent him from the States. The U.K. market of learner riders had several other makes of what were classed as Mopeds, (Motor and Pedals), but the Fantic T.I. quickly gained popularity with the rapid growth of a dealer network. The six speed gearbox was a strong selling point, and the perky Italian Minarelli 49cc engine proved to be very reliable. Stories of the T.I. model reaching 70 mph were an exaggeration, as only just over 50-55 mph could be achieved, and in the right conditions. The 125cc Chopper model could top 80 mph, as Terence Shea found when the model was first demonstrated to him at the Fantic factory in Barzago, Italy. He test rode the new 125cc chopper model, reaching a top speed 130 km/h (81 mph). The chopper model was the original inspiration which the new U.K. importer saw as very special and distinct for a niche market, and fame grew. Part of the original marketing and advertising included a Fantic 125cc chopper model being given to comedian Dick Emery. There were many photos of Dick Emery with Terry Shea and Frank Harris of the U.K. importer, and one was blown up very large which showed Terence Shea standing next to the 'bike with his hand on the handlebars with Dick Emery sitting on it. Another popular model was the 125cc Caballero was for on/off-road, which was for a different sector of the market. The market for these types of Mopeds only lasted a handful of years. The official U.K. importers glossy studio photograph of the 125cc Chopper model was taken in London, and Terence Shea and Frank Harris of the Barron Eurotrade importer was taken from Hornchurch to London on a trailer towed by car. There was confusion in central London as to which turn to take at one particular junction on the way to the studio, which resulted in the trailer having to be unhooked and physically turned around in the narrow road and extremely busy area for the correct journey to the studio to be continued, much to the amusement of onlookers.

In the 1980s, Fantic enjoyed success in the Observed trials world championships, taking three titles as well as seven wins at the prestigious Scottish Six Days Trial.

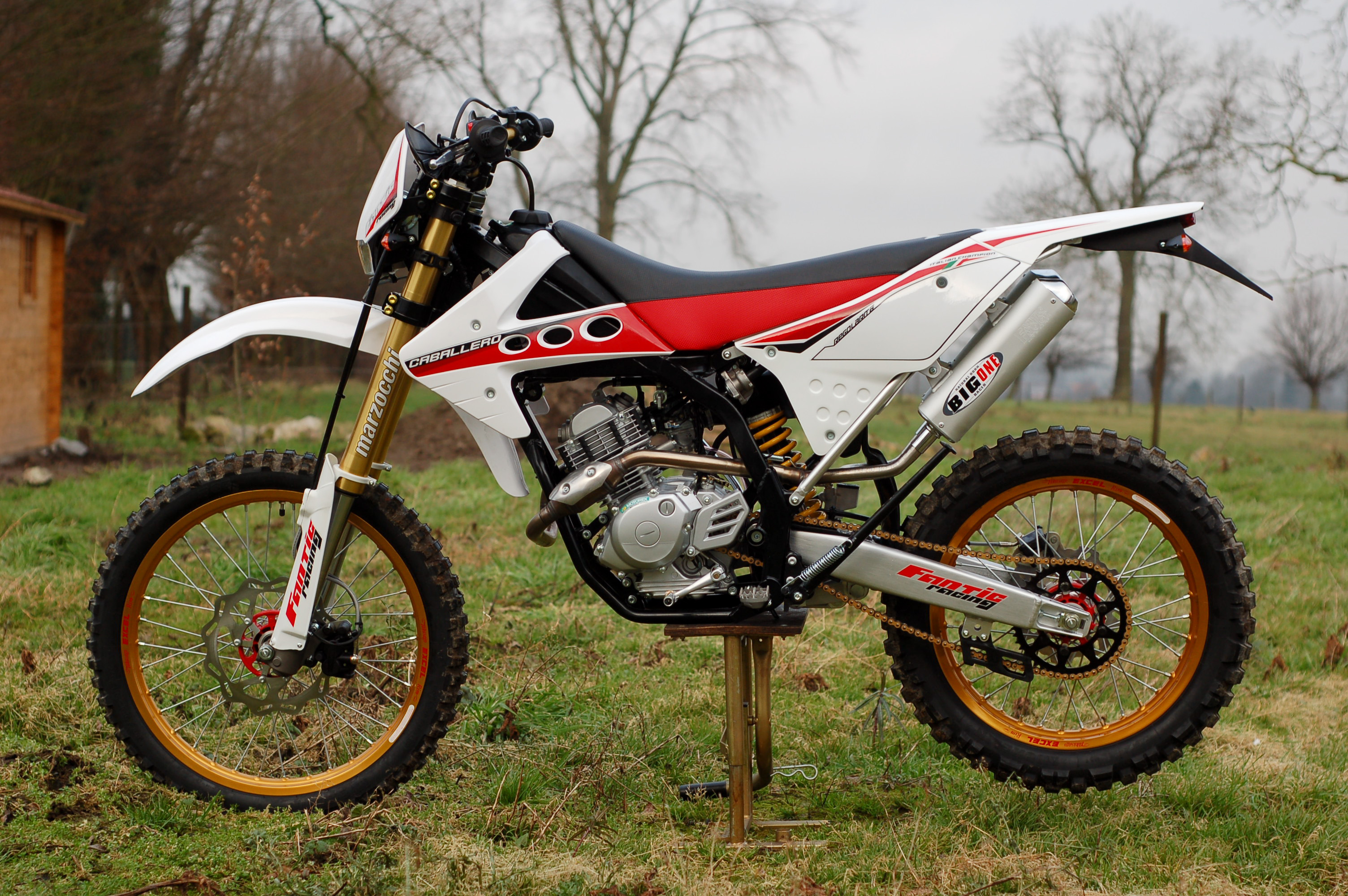
2009 Fantic TZ 150

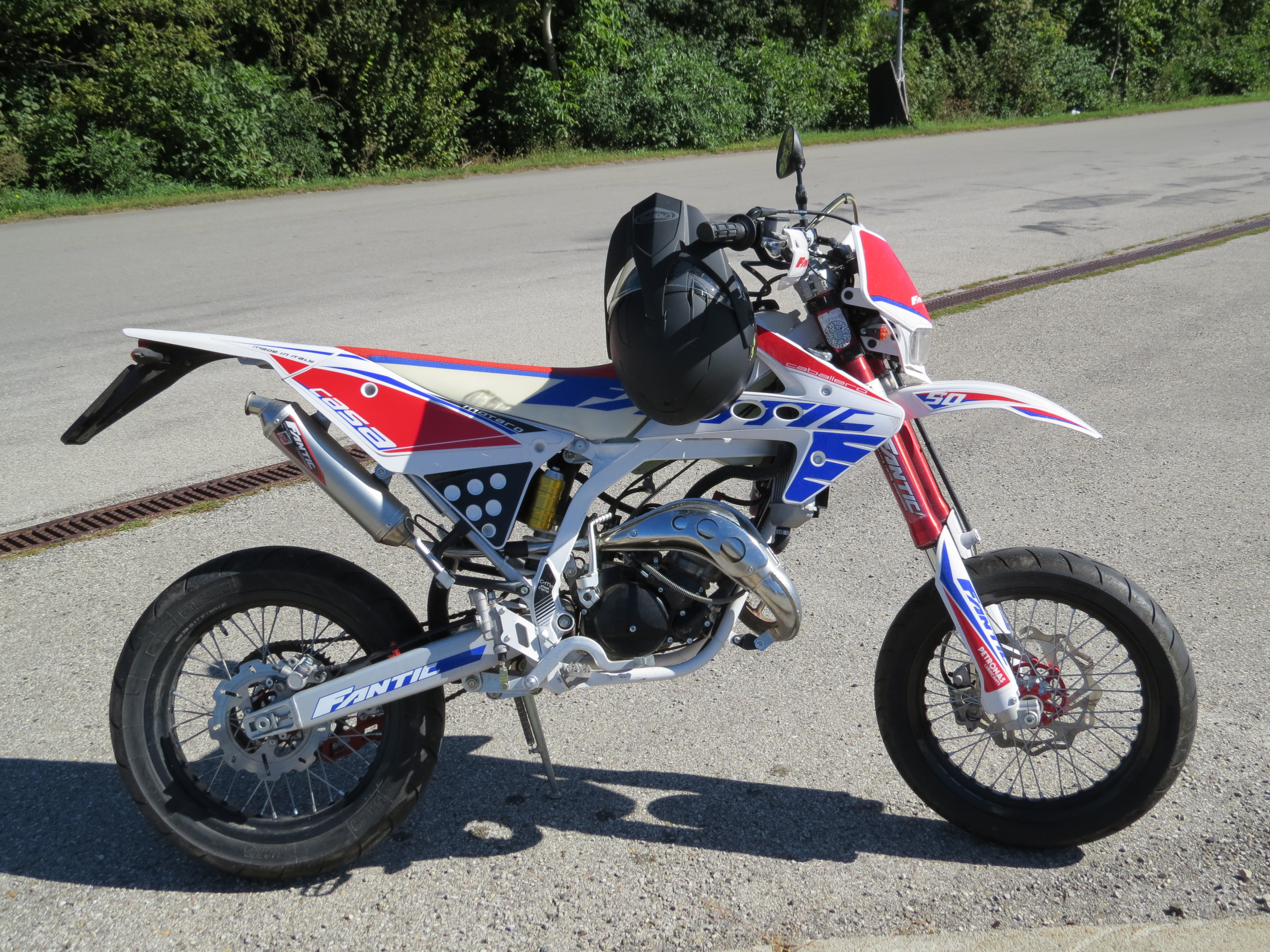
2017 Fantic Caballero 50

In October 2020, Fantic bought Minarelli from Yamaha.

== Racing ==
Fantic Racing
- 2025 name: Fantic Racing Lino Sonego
- Base: Italy
- Principal: Stefano Bedon
- Rider(s): Moto2: 7. Barry Baltus; 14. Tony Arbolino
- Motorcycle: Kalex Moto2
- Tyres: Pirelli
- Riders' Championships: –
- Teams' Championships: 1; 2025

=== Grand Prix motorcycle ===
In the 2005 season, Fantic competed in the 250cc championship as Scuderia Fantic Motor GP.

=== MotoGP 250cc class ===
Fantic Motor is a new entry in the 2005 250cc world championship, Arnaud Vincent be a rider.

==== Results ====
(key) (Races in bold indicate pole position; races in italics indicate fastest lap)

Season	Class	Team	Motorcycle	Tyre	No.	Rider	1	2	3	4	5	6	7	8	9	10	11	12	13	14	15	16	Pos.	Point
2005	250cc	Scuderia Fantic Motor GP	Yamaha-Suter 250	**D**	20	(Italy) Gabriele Ferro	SPA; DNQ	POR; 13	CHN	FRA; DNQ	ITA; DNQ	CAT; 21	NED; DNQ	GBR; 18	GER; DNQ	CZE; DNQ	JPN; DNQ	MAL; DNQ	QAT; DNQ	AUS; DNQ	TUR; DNQ	VAL; DNQ	NC	0
2005	250cc	Scuderia Fantic Motor GP	Yamaha-Suter 250	**D**	21	(France) Arnaud Vincent	SPA; Ret	POR; Ret	CHN	FRA; DNQ	ITA; Ret	CAT; Ret	NED; 24	GBR; Ret	GER; Ret	CZE; 18	JPN; Ret	MAL; Ret	QAT; Ret	AUS; Ret	TUR; Ret	VAL; Ret	NC	0

=== Moto2 sponsorship ===
In the 2023 season, Fantic Motor competes in the Moto2 world championship but is the main sponsor of the VR46 Racing Team with its two riders, Celestino Vietti and Borja Gómez.

==== Race results ====
Year	Class	Team name	Motorcycle	No.	Riders	Races	Wins	Podiums	Poles	F. laps	Points	Pos.
2023	Moto2	Fantic Racing	Kalex Moto2	13	(Italy) Celestino Vietti	17	1	2	2	1	116	10th
2023	Moto2	Fantic Racing	Kalex Moto2	72	(Spain) Borja Gómez	13	0	0	0	0	0	30th
2023	Moto2	Fantic Racing	Kalex Moto2	9	(Italy) Mattia Casadei	7	0	0	0	0	0	40th
2023	Moto2	Fantic Racing	Kalex Moto2	43	(Italy) Lorenzo Baldassarri	1	0	0	0	0	0	45th
2024	Moto2	Fantic Racing	Kalex Moto2	20	(Andorra) Xavi Cardelús	18	0	0	0	0	0	31st
2024	Moto2	Fantic Racing	Kalex Moto2	44	(Spain) Arón Canet	19	4	8	6	6	234	2nd
2024	Moto2	Fantic Racing	Kalex Moto2	31	(Spain) Roberto García	1	0	0	0	0	0	NC
2024	Moto2	Fantic Racing	Kalex Moto2	31	(Spain) Roberto García	1	0	0	0	0	0	NC
2025	Moto2	Fantic Racing Lino Sonego	Kalex Moto2	7	(Belgium) Barry Baltus	22	0	7	1	2	232	3rd
2025	Moto2	Fantic Racing Lino Sonego	Kalex Moto2	44	(Spain) Arón Canet	22	1	6	1	0	227	4th
2025	Moto2	Fantic Racing Redemption	Kalex Moto2	54	(Italy) Mattia Pasini	2	0	0	0	0	0	37th
2026	Moto2	Reds Fantic Racing	Kalex Moto2	7	(Belgium) Barry Baltus	16	0	1	0	0	61*	14th*
2026	Moto2	Reds Fantic Racing	Kalex Moto2	9	(Spain) Jorge Navarro	2	0	0	0	0	0*	31st*
2026	Moto2	Reds Fantic Racing	Kalex Moto2	14	(Italy) Tony Arbolino	19	0	1	1	0	82.5*	13th*

Key
Regular rider
Replacement rider
Wildcard rider
Replacement/wildcard rider

==== By season ====
(key) (Races in bold indicate pole position; races in italics indicate fastest lap)

Year	Motorcycle	Tyres	Riders	1	2	3	4	5	6	7	8	9	10	11	12	13	14	15	16	17	18	19	20	21	22	Points	RC	Points	TC	Points	MC
2023	Kalex Moto2	D		POR	ARG	AME	SPA	FRA	ITA	GER	NED	GBR	AUT	CAT	RSM	IND	JPN	INA	AUS	THA	MAL	QAT	VAL								
2023	Kalex Moto2	D	(Italy) Celestino Vietti	11	13	**9**	Ret	4	5	10	10	12	1	10	**2**	DNS			Ret	Ret	Ret	6	Ret			116	10th	116	10th	462.5	1st
2023	Kalex Moto2	D	(Spain) Borja Gómez	17	21	20	19	23	17	DNS	Ret	Ret	16	20	18	16	24									0	27th	116	10th	462.5	1st
2023	Kalex Moto2	D	(Italy) Mattia Casadei														26	24	Ret	21	21	26	25			0	40th	116	10th	462.5	1st
2023	Kalex Moto2	D	(Italy) Lorenzo Baldassarri															23								0	42nd	116	10th	462.5	1st
2024	Kalex Moto2	P		QAT	POR	AME	SPA	FRA	CAT	ITA	NED	GER	GBR	AUT	ARA	RSM	EMI	INA	JPN	AUS	THA	MAL	SLD								
2024	Kalex Moto2	P	(Andorra) Xavi Cardelús	23	Ret	26	17	21	16	23	DNS		Ret	26	22	27	23	Ret	25	20	20	21	23			0	31st	234	7th	437	1st
2024	Kalex Moto2	P	(Spain) Arón Canet	**10**	1	**9**	DNS	**6**	Ret	6	Ret	Ret	2	4	Ret	2	**2**	**1**	16	2	1	8	**1**			234	2nd	234	7th	437	1st
2024	Kalex Moto2	P	(Spain) Roberto García									Ret											Ret			0	NC	234	7th	437	1st
2025	Kalex Moto2	P		THA	ARG	AME	QAT	SPA	FRA	GBR	ARA	ITA	NED	GER	CZE	AUT	HUN	CAT	RSM	JPN	INA	AUS	MAL	POR	VAL						
2025	Kalex Moto2	P	(Belgium) Barry Baltus	6	12	7	6	2	2	Ret	3	11	Ret	2	**2**	7	12	10	2	7	4	6	3	5	Ret	232	3rd	459	1st	518	1st
2025	Kalex Moto2	P	(Spain) Arón Canet	2	4	4	1	8	3	**4**	6	3	2	7	Ret	10	6	Ret	7	15	3	9	15	4	15	227	4th	459	1st	518	1st
2025	Kalex Moto2	P	(Italy) Mattia Pasini												Ret	22										0	37th	459	1st	518	1st
2026	Kalex Moto2	P		THA	BRA	AME	QAT	SPA	FRA	CAT	ITA	HUN	CZE	NED	GER	GBR	ARA	RSM	AUT	JPN	INA	AUS	MAL	POR	VAL						
2026	Kalex Moto2	P	(Belgium) Barry Baltus	14	14	**6**	Ret	Ret	13	8	12	DNS			9	15	3	8	16	18	C	17	15			61*	14th*	143.5*	10th*	442.5*	1st
2026	Kalex Moto2	P	(Italy) Tony Arbolino	13	7	10	8	14	17	11	10	19	11	16	Ret	16	5	14	2	9	C	16	18			82.5*	13th*	143.5*	10th*	442.5*	1st
2026	Kalex Moto2	P	(Spain) Jorge Navarro										25	18												0*	31st*	143.5*	10th*	442.5*	1st

* Season still in progress.

== Current models ==
=== Motard ===
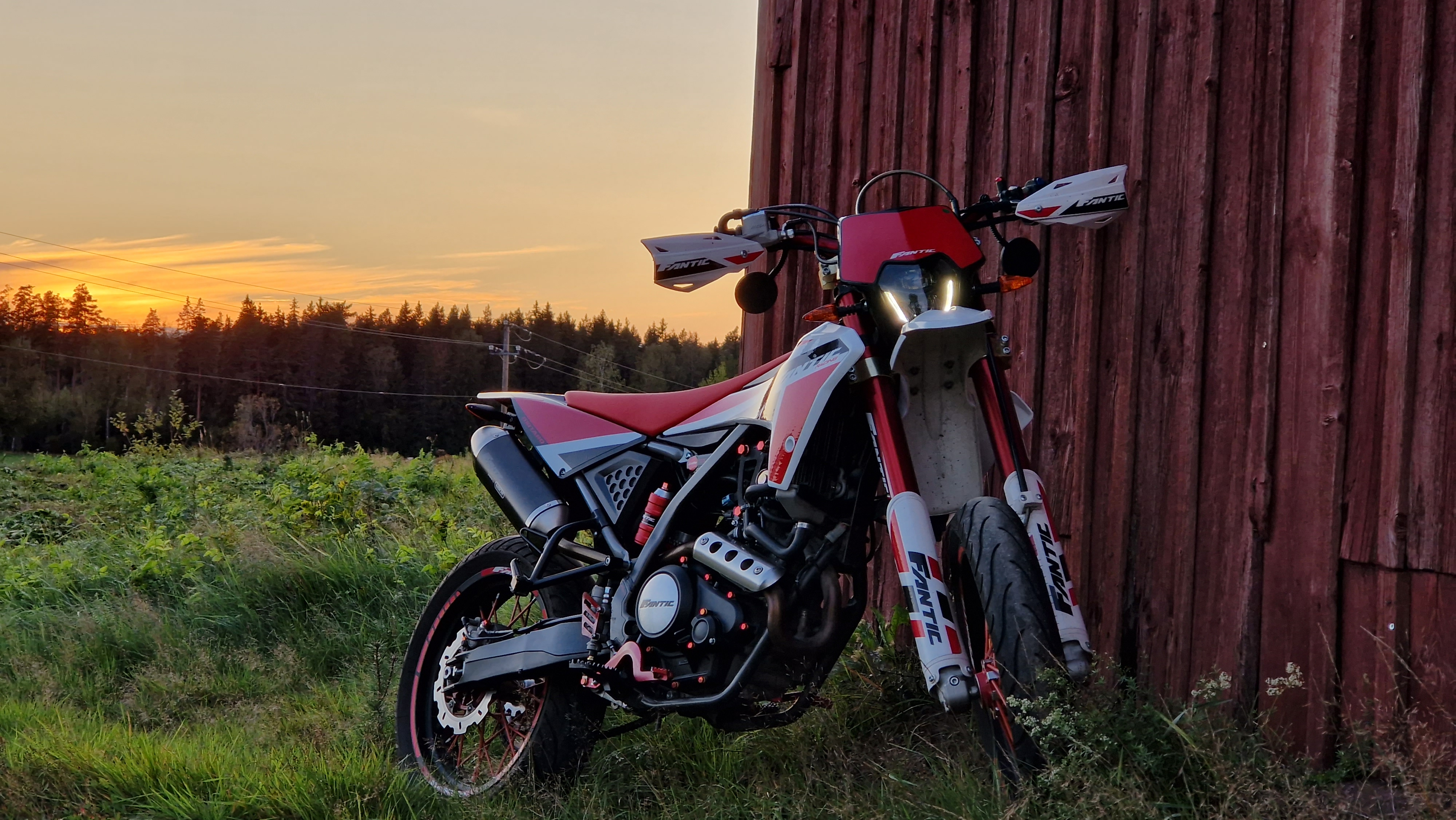
2022 Fantic XMF 125

- Fantic XM 50: Performance or Competition
- Fantic XMF 125: Performance or Competition

=== Scrambler ===
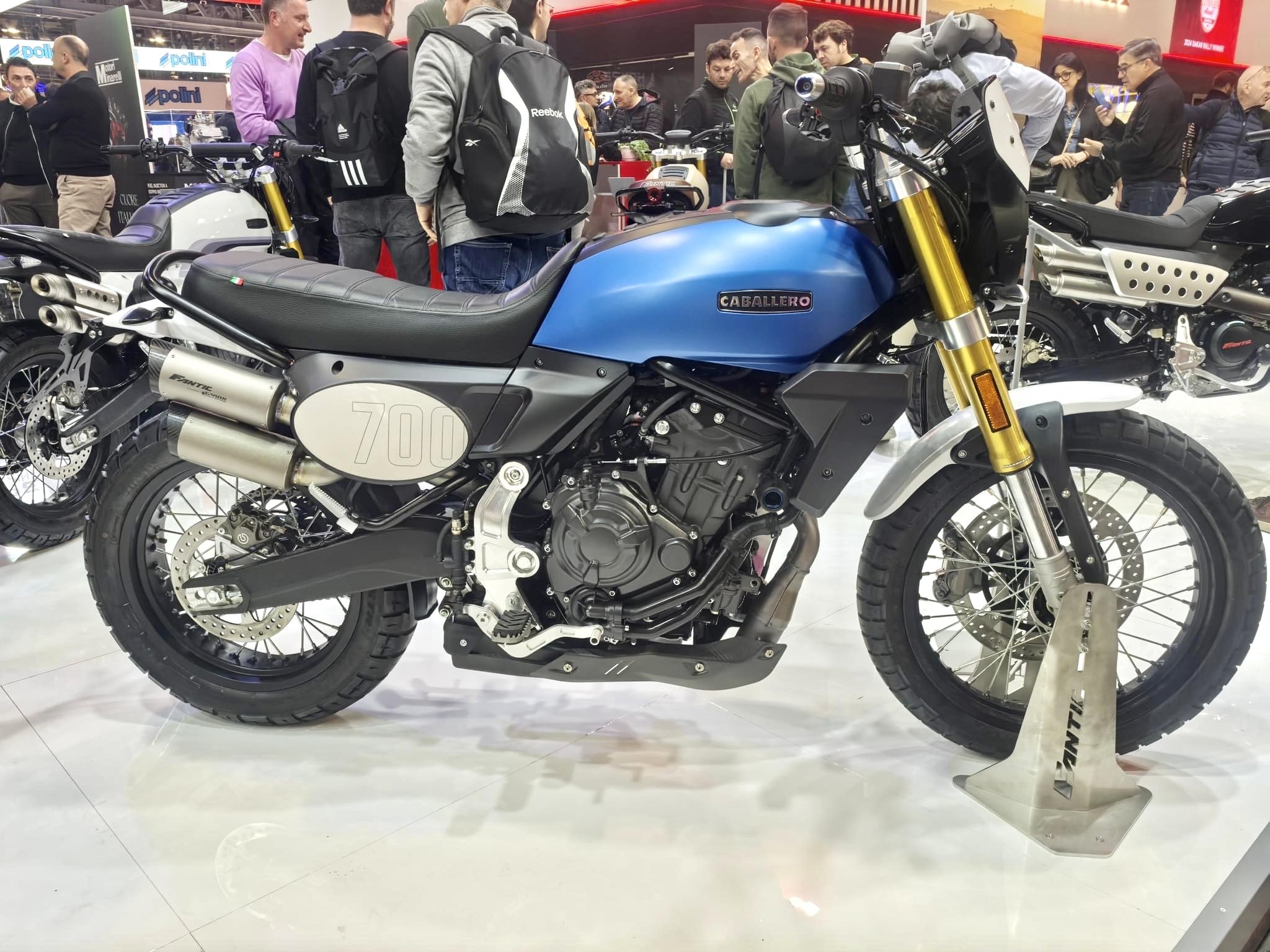
2026 Fantic Caballero 700

- Fantic Caballero 125: Scrambler or Flat track
- Fantic Caballero 500: Scrambler, Flat track or Rally
- Fantic Caballero 700: Scrambler

=== Scooter/Moped ===
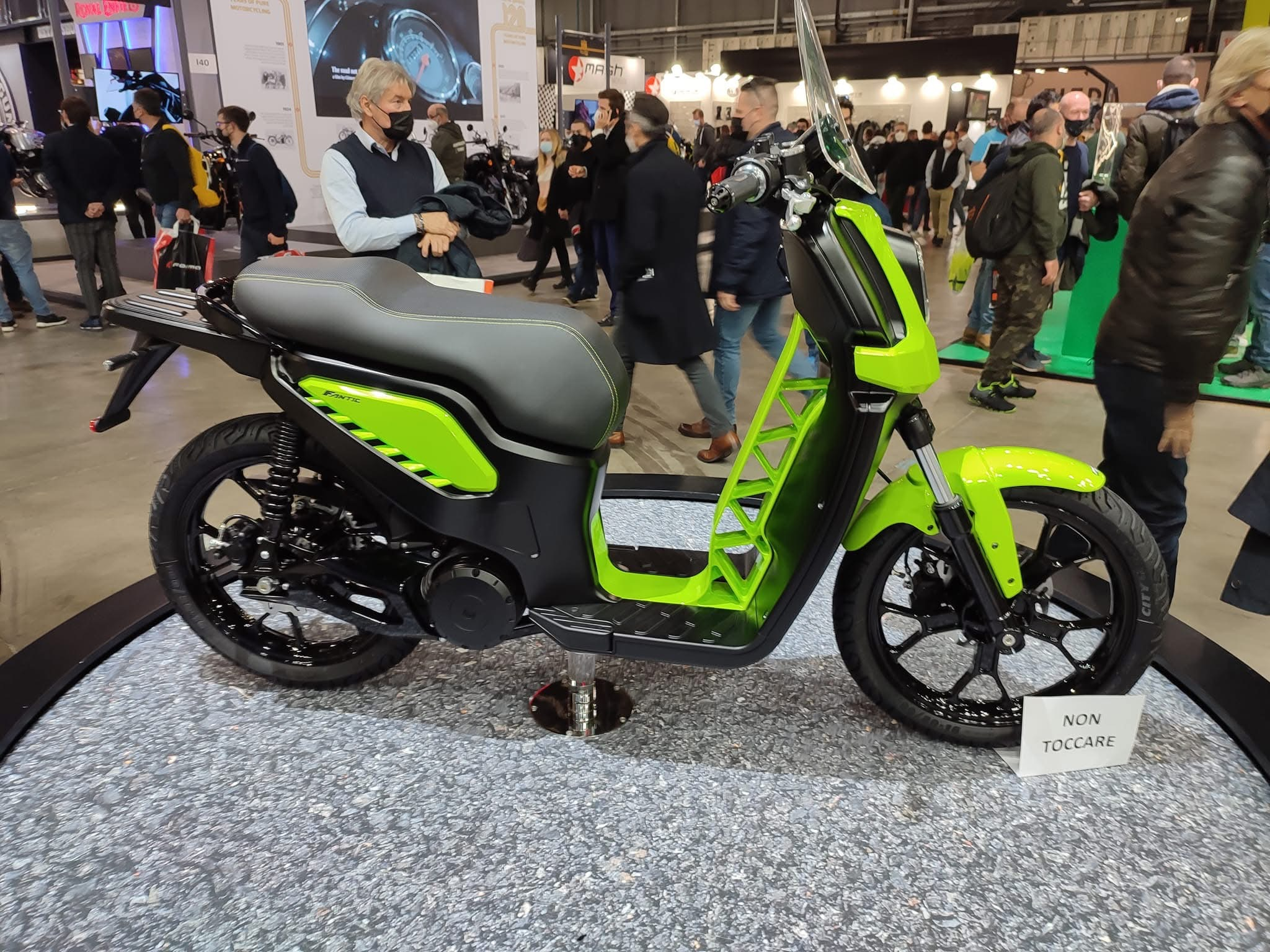
2026 Fantic Issimo City

- Fantic Issimo: Moped
- Fantic Issimo City: Scooter

=== Enduro/Motocross ===
- Fantic XE 50: Enduro
- Fantic XE 125: Enduro
- Fantic XE 300: Enduro
- Fantic XEF 125: Enduro
- Fantic XEF 250: Enduro
- Fantic XEF 300: Enduro
- Fantic XEF 450: Enduro
- Fantic XX 125: Motocross
- Fantic XX 250: Motocross
- Fantic XXF 250: Motocross
- Fantic XXF 450: Motocross

=== Rally ===
- Fantic XEF Rally 450
- Fantic XEF Rally Factory 450

=== Sport/Naked ===
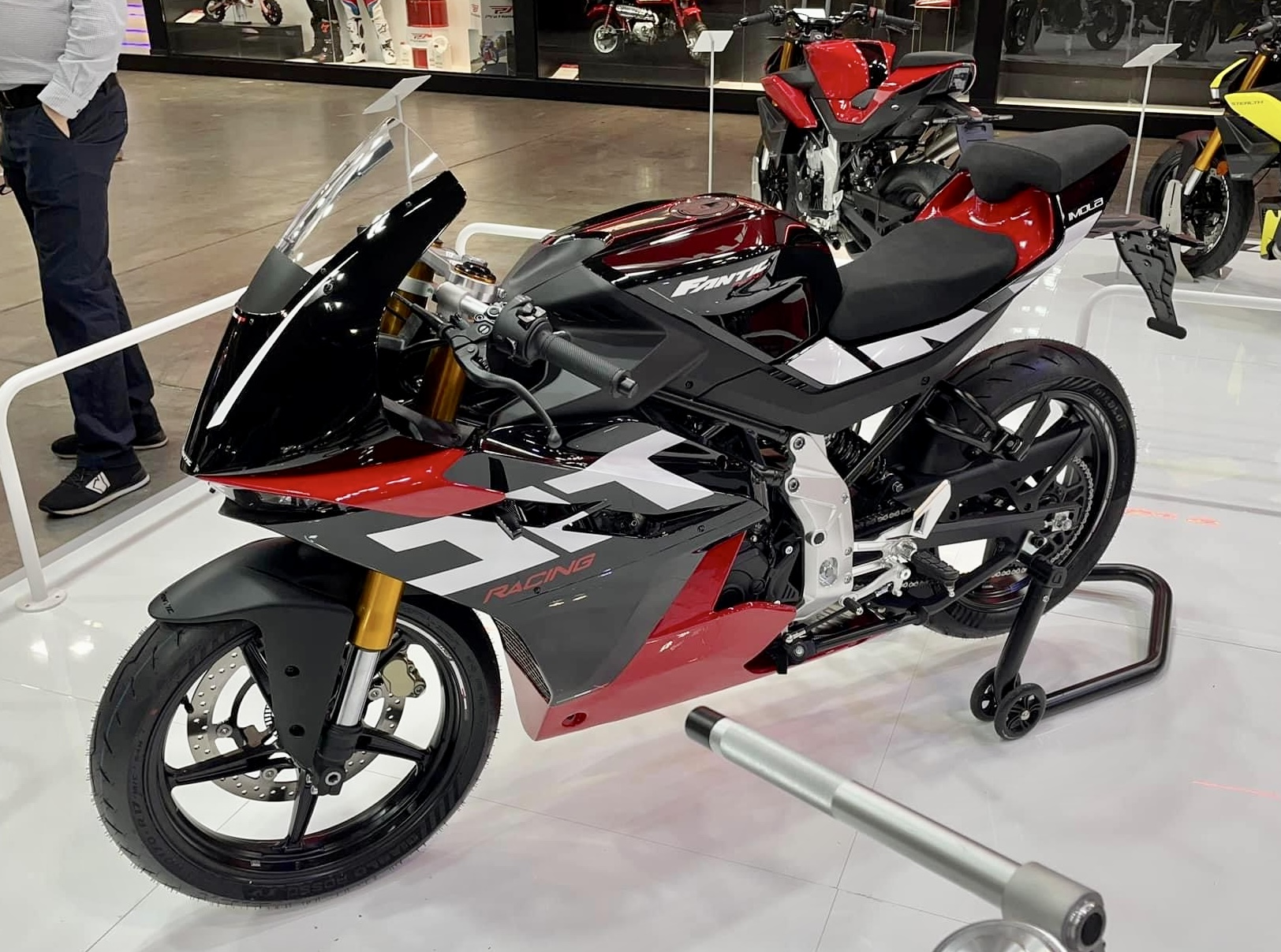
2026 Fantic Imola 500

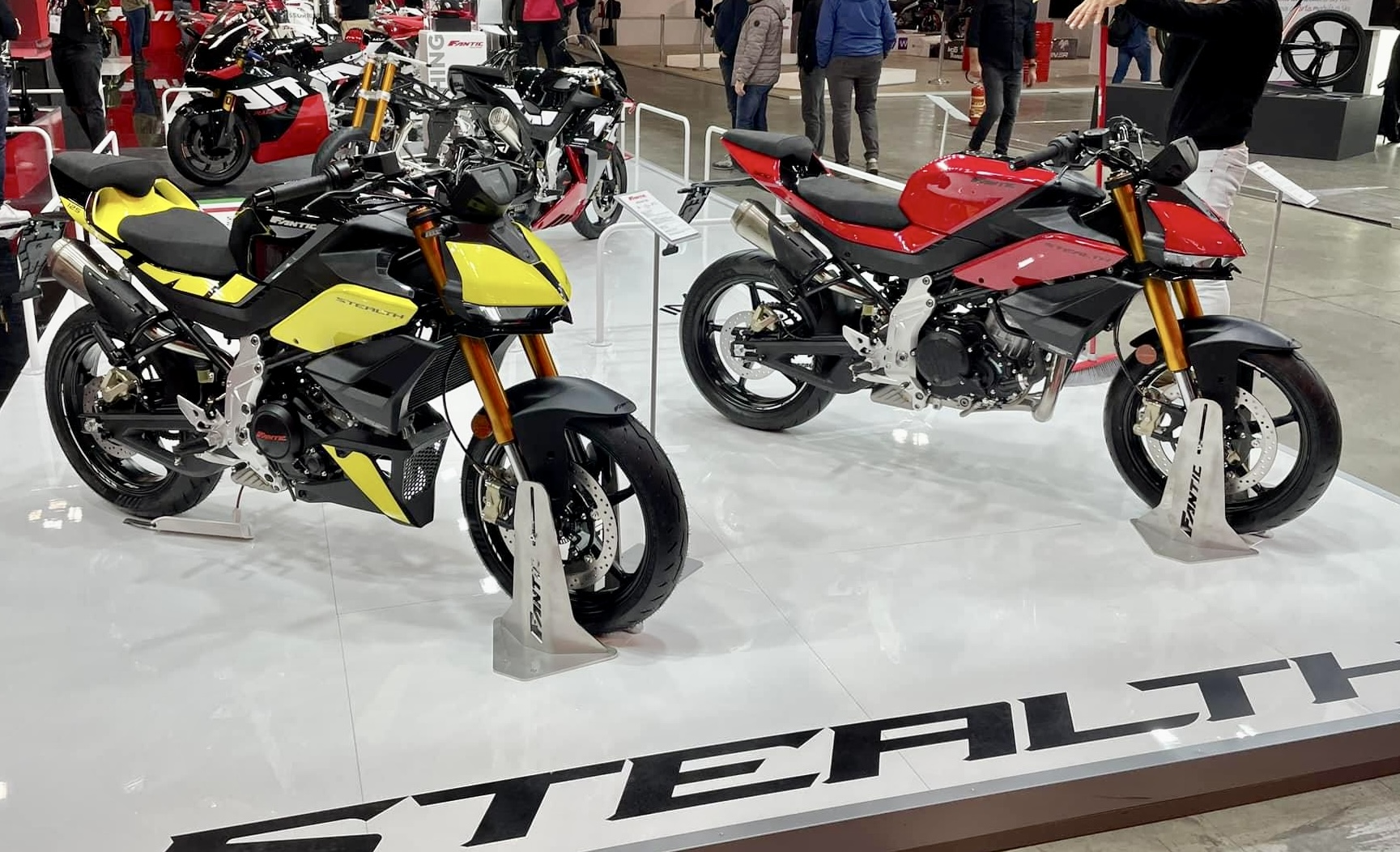
2026 Fantic Stealth

- Fantic Stealth 125: Naked
- Fantic Stealth 500: Naked
- Fantic Imola 125: Sport
- Fantic Imola 500: Sport

== Past models ==
=== Standard ===
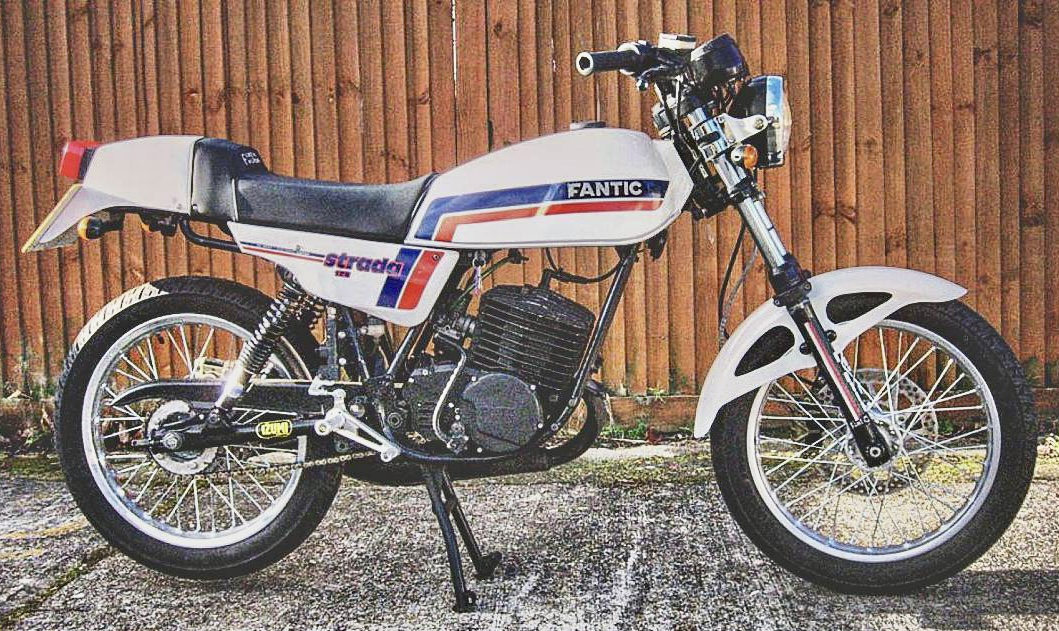
Fantic Strada 125

- Fantic Caballero 250
- Fantic Strada 125

=== Enduro ===
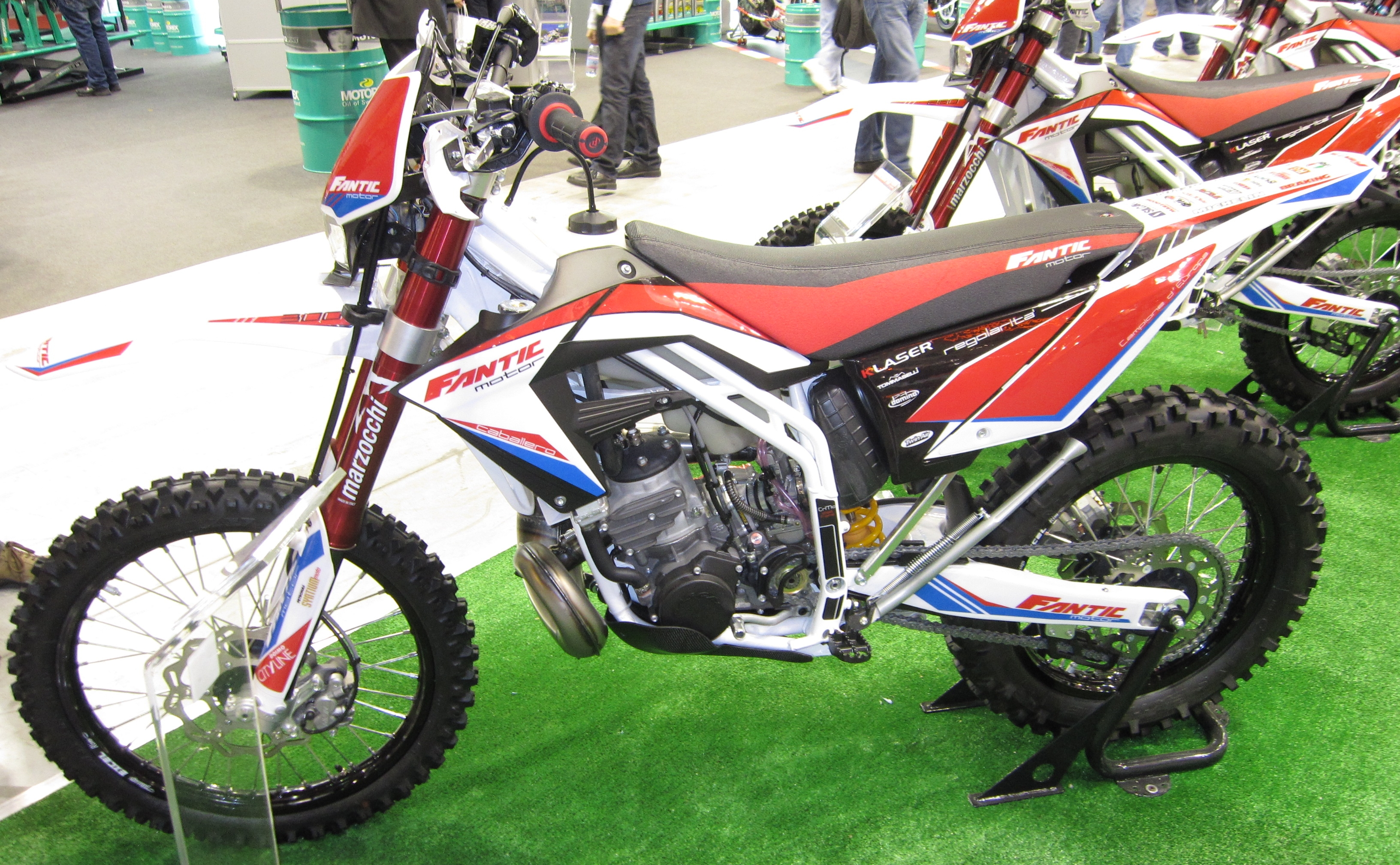
2012 Fantic Caballero TZ 300

- Fantic Raider 125
- Fantic TZ 50 (also known as Caballero 50)
- Fantic TZ 125 (also known as Caballero 125)
- Fantic TZ 150 (also known as Caballero 150)
- Fantic TZ 300 (also known as Caballero 300)

=== Motard ===
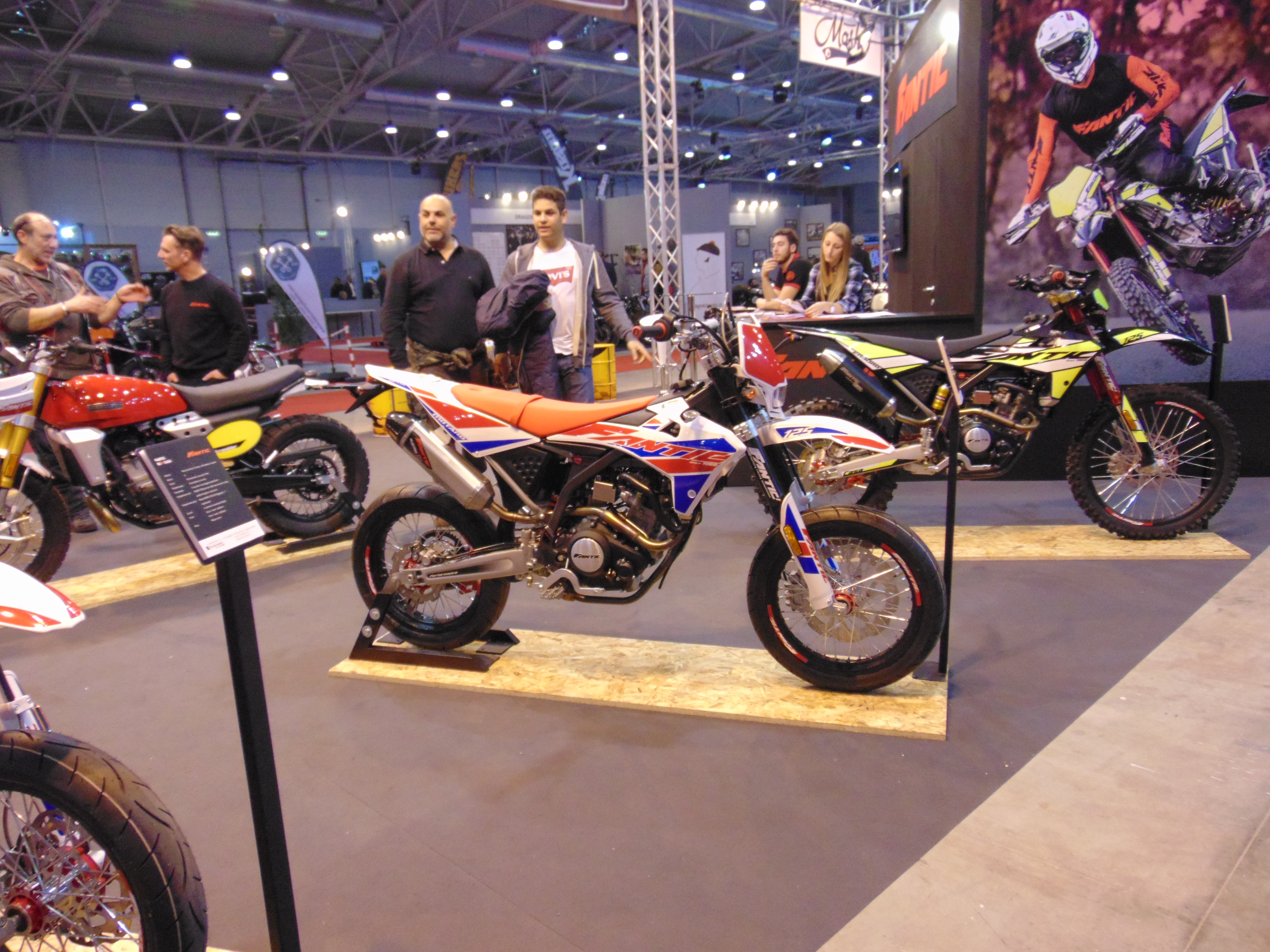
Fantic Motard 125

- Fantic Motard Casa 50 (currently sold as the XM 50)
- Fantic Motard Casa 125 (currently sold as the XMF 125)
- Fantic Motard Casa 250
- Fantic Supersei 50
- Fantic Supersei 125

=== Trial ===
- Fantic Trial 125
- Fantic Trial 200
- Fantic Trial 300

=== Chopper ===
- Fantic Chopper Moped

== See also ==
- List of Italian companies
- List of motorcycle manufacturers
