= 2017 European Motocross Championship =

The 2017 European Motocross Championship was the 29th European Motocross Championship season since it was revived in 1988. It included 15 events and 6 different classes. It started at Maggiora in Italy on 16 April, and ended at Villars-sous-Écot in France on 17 September. All rounds acted as support classes at the European rounds of the 2017 MXGP.

== EMX250 ==
A 9-round calendar for the 2017 season was announced on 20 October 2016. EMX250 is for riders competing on 4-stroke motorcycles between 175cc-250cc.

=== EMX250 ===
Round	Date	Grand Prix	Location	Race 1 Winner	Race 2 Winner	Round Winner	Report
1	16 April	Italy	Pietramurata	(Italy) Simone Furlotti	(Italy) Morgan Lesiardo	(Italy) Simone Furlotti	Report
2	23 April	Netherlands	Valkenswaard	(Finland) Miro Sihvonen	(Finland) Miro Sihvonen	(Finland) Miro Sihvonen	Report
3	7 May	Latvia	Kegums	(New Zealand) Josiah Natzke	(Belgium) Jago Geerts	(New Zealand) Josiah Natzke	Report
4	28 May	France	Ernee	(France) Mathys Boisrame	(Italy) Alberto Forato	(France) Mathys Boisrame	Report
5	11 June	Russia	Orlyonok	(France) Mathys Boisrame	(United States) Tristan Charboneau	(Italy) Simone Furlotti	Report
6	25 June	Italy	Ottobiano	(Italy) Morgan Lesiardo	(Italy) Simone Furlotti	(Italy) Morgan Lesiardo	Report
7	2 July	Portugal	Agueda	(United States) Tristan Charboneau	(United States) Tristan Charboneau	(United States) Tristan Charboneau	Report
8	13 August	Switzerland	Frauenfeld	(United States) Tristan Charboneau	(Italy) Morgan Lesiardo	(United States) Tristan Charboneau	Report
9	17 September	France	Villars-sous-Écot	(United States) Tristan Charboneau	(France) Anthony Bourdon	(United Kingdom) James Dunn	Report

=== Participants ===
Team	Constructor	No	Rider	Rounds
GL12 Racing	KTM	2	(United Kingdom) James Dunn	9
GL12 Racing	KTM	55	(Netherlands) Mike Kras	2
GL12 Racing	KTM	212	(United Kingdom) Lewis Gregory	1–2
Silver Action KTM	KTM	3	(Italy) Davide Cislaghi	1–2, 8–9
Silver Action KTM	KTM	25	(Italy) Nicola Bertuzzi	1–2, 4, 6, 8–9
Silver Action KTM	KTM	34	(South Africa) Bradley Cox	2, 4
Silver Action KTM	KTM	37	(Italy) Yuri Quarti	1–2, 4, 6–9
SEC Construction KTM	KTM	6	(Netherlands) Kevin van Geldorp	2
Jezyk Racing Team	Husqvarna	7	(Spain) Nil Bussot	1–4, 6–8
STC Racing	Kawasaki	8	(Austria) Michael Kratzer	1
Rodeo MX Racing Team	KTM	9	(Latvia) Kristers Drevinskis	3
Elf Team Pfeil Kawasaki	Kawasaki	10	(Czech Republic) Filip Neugebauer	8
Elf Team Pfeil Kawasaki	Kawasaki	53	(Slovakia) Simon Jost	8
Elf Team Pfeil Kawasaki	Kawasaki	251	(Belgium) Jens Getteman	1–2
Elf Team Pfeil Kawasaki	Kawasaki	329	(Netherlands) Luca Nijenhuis	1–2
Kawasaki Nitro	Kawasaki	11	(Iceland) Eythor Reynisson	1–2
Ausio Yamaha	Yamaha	12	(Spain) Oriol Casas	1–2, 6–9
Ausio Yamaha	Yamaha	292	(Spain) Alex Gamboa	9
	Yamaha	13	(Spain) Mahy Villanueva	1, 6
KTM Switzerland	KTM	14	(Switzerland) Maurice Chanton	8–9
ASTES4-TESAR Yamaha	Yamaha	16	(Latvia) Karlis Sabulis	1–3, 7–9
ASTES4-TESAR Yamaha	Yamaha	39	(Netherlands) Roan van de Moosdijk	6–7, 9
ASTES4-TESAR Yamaha	Yamaha	253	(Slovenia) Jan Pancar	1–4, 6–9
ASTES4-TESAR Yamaha	Yamaha	644	(Netherlands) Nick Kouwenberg	1–7
ASTES4-TESAR Yamaha	Yamaha	959	(France) Maxime Renaux	
Apico CPS Husqvarna	Husqvarna	17	(United Kingdom) Robert Holyoake	4
	Honda	18	(Switzerland) Enzo Steffen	8–9
Team Double-O-Seven	Yamaha	20	(Belgium) Jorne Tytgat	2, 4
Team Double-O-Seven	Husqvarna	167	(Belgium) Wietse Brackman	2, 4
137 KTM Motorsport	KTM	21	(Finland) Emil Silander	3
137 KTM Motorsport	KTM	142	(Finland) Jere Haavisto	All
Resa Racing	Yamaha	22	(Netherlands) Mike Bolink	2, 8
Sarholz KTM	KTM	26	(Germany) Tom Koch	1–4, 6–9
Lakerveld Racing	Yamaha	28	(Netherlands) Kay Ebben	1–3, 6, 8
Lakerveld Racing	Yamaha	36	(Netherlands) Noud van Kraaij	1
Lakerveld Racing	Yamaha	188	(Netherlands) Joshua van der Linden	1–2
Lakerveld Racing	Yamaha	335	(Belgium) Dennis Verbruggen	2
TM Racing Nederland	TM	29	(Norway) Sander Agard-Michelsen	2, 6, 8–9
Andre Motors KTM	KTM	30	(Netherlands) Rene de Jong	1–4, 6–9
Team Husqvarna Switzerland	Husqvarna	31	(Switzerland) Loris Freidig	6, 9
Gebben Van Vanrooy Kawasaki	Kawasaki	32	(Netherlands) Marcel Conijn	1–4, 6–9
Gebben Van Vanrooy Kawasaki	Kawasaki	403	(Denmark) Bastian Bøgh-Damm	3–4, 6–9
Hitachi KTM UK	KTM	33	(New Zealand) Josiah Natzke	1–5, 9
Steels Dr Jack	KTM	35	(Italy) Alessandro Lentini	6
SM Action Yamaha	Yamaha	40	(Italy) Simone Zecchina	6–9
SM Action Yamaha	Yamaha	722	(Italy) Michael Mantovani	7–8
SM Action Yamaha	Yamaha	957	(Italy) Simone Furlotti	1–8
Diga Process Husqvarna	Husqvarna	41	(Australia) Caleb Grothues	1–2, 6–9
Diga Process Husqvarna	Husqvarna	51	(France) Adrien Malaval	1–2, 4, 6–9
Diga Process Husqvarna	Husqvarna	107	(Netherlands) Lars van Berkel	9
Globbz KTM France	KTM	43	(France) Natanael Bres	8–9
Maggiora Park Racing Team	KTM	44	(Italy) Morgan Lesiardo	1–3
Monster Energy Kawasaki	Kawasaki	44	(Italy) Morgan Lesiardo	4–9
Monster Energy Kawasaki	Kawasaki	118	(France) Stephen Rubini	1–2
DS Performance Suspension	KTM	46	(Switzerland) Nico Jucker	6, 8
Carglass-Honda Racing	Honda	52	(New Zealand) Dylan Walsh	All
Carglass-Honda Racing	Honda	112	(Australia) Jed Beaton	1–6, 8
Carglass-Honda Racing	Honda	271	(Spain) Sergio Fernandez	9
	Yamaha	54	(Belgium) Mattis Meersschout	4
Patrick Walther MX Racing	Yamaha	57	(Switzerland) David Schoch	4, 8
	KTM	59	(Russia) Ignatii Lopatin	2, 5
BUD Racing Kawasaki	Kawasaki	60	(United States) Tristan Charbonneau	All
BUD Racing Kawasaki	Kawasaki	73	(United States) Marshal Weltin	All
BUD Racing Kawasaki	Kawasaki	225	(France) Brian Strubhart-Moreau	9
BUD Racing Kawasaki	Kawasaki	485	(Finland) Kim Savaste	1–3, 6–8
BUD Racing Kawasaki	Kawasaki	520	(France) Jimmy Clochet	4
MX4 Yamaha	Yamaha	62	(Latvia) Arnolds Snikers	2–3, 9
CDP Cortenuova	Yamaha	64	(Italy) Ismaele Guarise	1
H4 Caluori Racing Team	Kawasaki	65	(Switzerland) Robin Scheiben	8
stielergruppe.mx Johannes-Bikes	Suzuki	66	(Germany) Tim Koch	8
F&H Racing Team	Kawasaki	70	(Spain) Rubén Fernández	All
CreyMert Racing	KTM	71	(Lithuania) Dovydas Karka	All
Motorrad Bauerschmidt KTM	KTM	991	(Poland) Szymon Staszkiewicz	1–4, 8
	Kawasaki	78	(Netherlands) Roy van Heugten	2
I-Fly JK Yamaha Racing	Yamaha	80	(Sweden) Ken Bengtson	All
I-Fly JK Yamaha Racing	Yamaha	871	(Italy) Manuel Iacopi	9
	KTM	87	(Switzerland) Sven Burch	8
Sahkar Racing KTM	KTM	93	(Belgium) Jago Geerts	1–7, 9
St Blazey MX	Husqvarna	98	(United Kingdom) Todd Kellett	1–4, 6–9
Team EMX Racing	Husqvarna	100	(Sweden) David Kadestam	2
Team EMX Racing	KTM	488	(Sweden) Jimmy Wicksell	2
Suzuki International Europe	Suzuki	101	(France) Zach Pichon	1–3, 5, 8
MX Slovakia	KTM	102	(Slovakia) Richard Sikyna	1
	Suzuki	103	(Belgium) Tanguy Gabriel	2
Team VHR KTM	KTM	110	(France) Scotty Verhaeghe	9
Team VHR KTM	KTM	720	(France) Pierre Goupillon	1–5, 7–9
Craigs Motorcycles Yamaha	Yamaha	115	(United Kingdom) Ashton Dickinson	8
Cofain Racing Team	KTM	116	(Austria) Manuel Perkhofer	3, 6, 8
REVO Husqvarna UK	Husqvarna	119	(United Kingdom) Mel Pocock	1–2, 4
KTM Spain	KTM	124	(Spain) Simeo Ubach	1–4, 6–9
Stord Speedshop	Yamaha	126	(Norway) Hakon Mindreboe	2, 8
CAP Racing Team	KTM	128	(France) Tom Vialle	4, 8–9
	KTM	129	(France) Timothe Berry	9
APJ Racing Team	Yamaha	131	(Croatia) Luka Crnkovic	1
Derks MX Racing	Yamaha	132	(Netherlands) Jarno Derks	9
Moffstar Racing	KTM	136	(United Kingdom) Matthew Moffat	2
STC Racing	Yamaha	137	(Liechtenstein) Luca Bruggmann	2–4, 6, 8
	Yamaha	141	(Lithuania) Arnas Milevicius	3
Team Hojbutiken Racing	Husqvarna	143	(Sweden) Sebastian Mårtensson	1
KTM Diga Junior Racing Team	KTM	147	(Finland) Miro Sihvonen	1–2, 4–7
KTM Diga Junior Racing Team	KTM	911	(Finland) Roni Kytönen	All
KTM Diga Junior Racing Team	KTM	977	(Slovakia) Thomas Kohut	8–9
	Kawasaki	148	(United Kingdom) Michael Eccles	1–4
Team Castro MX	Kawasaki	151	(Spain) Sergio Castro	1–2, 7
Denicol KTM	KTM	153	(Belgium) Greg Smets	2
Verde Sports KTM	KTM	160	(United Kingdom) Brad Anderson	2
Assomotor Honda Junior	Honda	172	(France) Mathys Boisrame	4–9
Assomotor Honda Junior	Honda	303	(Italy) Alberto Forato	All
Geartec Husqvarna Racing	Husqvarna	173	(United Kingdom) Luke Norris	2
Team Aventure Motorsport	Yamaha	176	(France) Jean-Loup Lepan	4, 6–8
	KTM	178	(Estonia) Hans Priidel	3
SPS Suspension Services	KTM	180	(United Kingdom) Josh Spinks	9
JE68 KTM	KTM	195	(Sweden) Felix Nilsson	2
Team Griekspoor	Husqvarna	199	(Netherlands) Lars Griekspoor	2
Martin Technology Honda	Honda	200	(Italy) Filippo Zonta	1, 6
Speedcity.pt	Yamaha	207	(Portugal) Bruno Charrua	7
	Husqvarna	209	(Italy) Gianmarco Cenerelli	6
Revolution Racing KTM	KTM	211	(Italy) Nicholas Lapucci	4, 6–9
JD 191 KTM	KTM	213	(Czech Republic) Petr Polak	9
SKS Racing Team	Husqvarna	223	(Netherlands) Michel Schoenmakers	2
Teresak KTM	KTM	224	(Czech Republic) Jakub Teresak	1
	Husqvarna	234	(Italy) Samuele Ghetti	6
	KTM	248	(France) Ludovic Bompar	8–9
	KTM	259	(Estonia) Johannes Nerman	3
TMX Competition	Yamaha	261	(France) Dylan Chanavat	1, 4
TMX Competition	Yamaha	751	(France) Germain Jamet	1, 4
Castrol Power1 Suzuki	Suzuki	262	(Germany) Mike Stender	1–2, 4–8
Team Pergetti	Yamaha	267	(Italy) Edoardo Bersanelli	1, 4, 6
	Honda	271	(Spain) Sergio Fernandez	7
De Carli KTM Junior	KTM	275	(Italy) Joakin Furbetta	1–4, 6
Ausio Yamaha	Yamaha	276	(Spain) Joan Rosell	7
	KTM	277	(Russia) Alexsey Strelkov	5
Raths Motorsports	Kawasaki	278	(Belgium) Thomas Vermijl	2, 4, 8–9
Bikesport Newcastle KTM	KTM	281	(United Kingdom) John Robson	2
Bloms MX Racing	KTM	282	(Sweden) Hampus Kahrle	1–2
Team Pulsion Moto	Honda	302	(France) Alexis Collignon	4, 6
	Yamaha	313	(Russia) Vasily Nesytykh	5
3MX Team	KTM	314	(Italy) Nicholas Lumina	6
3MX Team	KTM	393	(Italy) Thomas Martelli	1, 6, 8
	Husqvarna	321	(Belgium) Jurgen Wybo	4
	KTM	331	(Belgium) Omar Baloglu	2
Westside Racing Team	KTM	334	(Denmark) Mathias Gryning	2–3
Max Bart School Racing	Yamaha	343	(Italy) Tommaso Isdraele	8–9
KMP Honda Racing	Honda	371	(Spain) Joel Anton	4
SHR Motorsport	Yamaha	377	(Denmark) Nichlas Bjerregaard	1–2, 9
Numminen Racing Team	Husqvarna	400	(Finland) Jami Numminen	3
Kawasaki Estonia	Kawasaki	410	(Estonia) Indrek Mägi	1–3
	KTM	420	(Switzerland) Nicolas Gerber	8
Garin MX Team	Husqvarna	425	(Russia) Alexander Shershnev	5
	Honda	427	(Norway) Hakon Fredriksen	8
Mikkola Racing Team	KTM	461	(Belgium) Glenn Bielen	2
e-MX Racing Team	Yamaha	464	(Belgium) Mike Roose	1–4, 6
Kosak KTM	KTM	472	(Denmark) Glen Meier	1–2, 4, 9
KTM Scandinavia	KTM	499	(Sweden) Stefan Olsson	1–2
Suttel KTM34	KTM	519	(France) William Dho	1
Motolabo Suzuki France	Suzuki	520	(France) Jimmy Clochet	1
Icequeen Cryo Husqvarna	Husqvarna	555	(Russia) Artem Guryev	1, 8
Team Green UK	Kawasaki	600	(United Kingdom) Dylan Woodcock	9
	KTM	607	(France) Jordan Hebette	4
	KTM	655	(Russia) Daniil Balandin	3
Putoline Husqvarna	Husqvarna	714	(United Kingdom) Brad Todd	1–2
	Kawasaki	715	(Russia) Khetag Aguzarov	5
Subra Motos	KTM	718	(France) Henri Giraud	1
Team Dragon Moto	Yamaha	732	(Switzerland) Yan Reynard	9
Motostar Husqvarna	Husqvarna	741	(Sweden) Jesper Jönsson	2
Thermotec Racing KTM	KTM	766	(Austria) Michael Sandner	1–4, 6–7, 9
ASRT Racing Team	Kawasaki	770	(Estonia) Jan Jakobson	3
	Yamaha	772	(Portugal) André Sergio	7
	Yamaha	790	(Switzerland) Cyril Zurbrugg	8
	Yamaha	832	(France) Bastien Inghilleri	9
Mad Bros Racing	Husqvarna	838	(Italy) Paolo Ermini	1
Italian Factory KTM	KTM	841	(Italy) Luca Moroni	1, 4
	Kawasaki	848	(Italy) Giulio Nava	6
Cepelak Racing Team	Yamaha	881	(Czech Republic) Dusan Drdaj	8
Team SpecialMontering.dk	Yamaha	882	(Denmark) Jesper Kristensen	2
	Yamaha	900	(Netherlands) Menno Aussems	2
	KTM	902	(Switzerland) Killian Auberson	8
CBO Moto Husqvarna	Husqvarna	945	(France) Anthony Bourdon	1–2, 4, 9
	KTM	951	(Switzerland) Nico Seiler	4, 9
JWD Ferro-Therm KTM	KTM	955	(Poland) Gabriel Chetnicki	8
MGR Motocross Team	KTM	974	(Italy) Mario Tamai	6, 8
M2R Tuning	KTM	990	(Netherlands) Stefan Hage	2
	Husqvarna	998	(Belgium) Erik Willems	9

=== Riders Championship ===
Pos	Rider	Bike	TRE (Italy)		NED (Netherlands)		LAT (Latvia)		FRA (France)		RUS (Russia)		ITA (Italy)		POR (Portugal)		SUI (Switzerland)		FRA (France)		Points
1	(Italy) Lesiardo	KTM	5	1	4	10	2	3													294
1	(Italy) Lesiardo	Kawasaki							5	9	5	14	1	2	13	12	5	1	13	4	294
2	(Italy) Furlotti	Yamaha	1	3	18	6	4	16	26	4	2	3	3	1	2	2	14	Ret			242
3	(Spain) Fernández	Kawasaki	Ret	4	2	25	3	7	17	5	Ret	19	4	3	9	5	2	13	3	10	223
4	(Italy) Forato	Honda	3	29	9	26	6	5	12	1	4	10	9	7	8	6	21	9	8	DNS	205
5	(United States) Charboneau	Kawasaki	9	36	19	17	21	Ret	27	15	Ret	1	6	23	1	1	1	3	1	13	192
6	(United States) Weltin	Kawasaki	Ret	11	13	8	11	17	9	18	3	17	13	10	3	3	4	7	16	Ret	180
7	(Belgium) Geerts	KTM	37	20	Ret	2	5	1	2	3	13	7	26	6	7	7			Ret	DNS	171
8	(Sweden) Bengtson	Yamaha	8	18	6	9	10	6	8	12	11	16	7	4	14	14	13	11	26	DNS	170
9	(France) Boisrame	Honda							1	2	1	6	20	DNS	4	4	6	4	Ret	11	167
10	(France) Goupillon	KTM	21	7	Ret	30	35	25	3	10	Ret	2			6	8	11	6	6	16	140
11	(Finland) Sihvonen	KTM	4	2	1	1			DNS	DNS	10	Ret	12	14	12	Ret					126
12	(Finland) Haavisto	KTM	28	6	8	28	34	8	28	20	8	8	5	9	25	19	10	10	20	18	124
13	(United Kingdom) Kellett	Husqvarna	29	8	11	18	15	9	4	13			10	Ret	10	Ret	9	8	17	DNS	121
14	(Australia) Beaton	Honda	14	26	15	11	8	4	10	19	Ret	4	DNQ	DNQ			12	2			116
15	(Latvia) Sabulis	Yamaha	2	5	5	22	9	31							Ret	9	17	16	9	12	108
16	(New Zealand) Natzke	KTM	27	30	29	16	1	2	13	6	9	9							Ret	Ret	99
17	(Germany) Stender	Suzuki	DNQ	DNQ	17	Ret			7	8	6	11	15	11	11	13	Ret	12			99
18	(Netherlands) Kouwenberg	KTM	10	9	3	3	Ret	11	32	Ret	12	15	11	Ret	29	Ret					98
19	(France) Malaval	Husqvarna	24	19	DNQ	DNQ			6	14			23	17	17	10	7	5	11	Ret	83
20	(Germany) Koch	KTM	DNQ	DNQ	21	Ret	20	12	DNQ	DNQ			16	15	28	15	16	14	15	5	61
21	(Italy) Lapucci	KTM							Ret	16			2	8	5	Ret	Ret	Ret	18	DNS	59
22	(Italy) Zecchina	Yamaha											Ret	12	16	Ret	Ret	Ret	5	2	52
23	(France) Pichon	Suzuki	12	27	16	31	7	Ret			16	13					15	Ret			47
24	(United Kingdom) Pocock	Husqvarna	17	17	7	12			Ret	7											45
25	(Netherlands) van de Moosdijk	Yamaha											8	5	Ret	25			7	20	44
26	(United Kingdom) Dunn	KTM																	2	3	42
27	(New Zealand) Walsh	Honda	13	25	Ret	29	36	22	21	Ret	7	5	19	21	19	Ret	DNQ	DNQ	DNQ	DNQ	42
28	(Austria) Sandner	KTM	22	10	DNQ	DNQ	19	10	11	21			Ret	DNS	15	Ret			28	Ret	40
29	(France) Bourdon	Husqvarna	35	24	DNQ	DNQ			24	23									12	1	34
30	(Denmark) Bjerregaard	Yamaha	18	15	10	7													22	Ret	34
31	(Italy) Zonta	Honda	11	13									14	13							33
32	(Slovenia) Pancar	Yamaha	DNQ	DNQ	DNQ	DNQ	33	26	DNQ	DNQ			22	16	23	11	28	27	Ret	8	28
33	(Netherlands) de Jong	KTM	32	34	DNQ	DNQ	14	18	29	26			18	18	22	Ret	22	22	23	9	28
34	(United Kingdom) Eccles	Kawasaki	26	23	Ret	4	Ret	21	14	24											25
35	(Finland) Savaste	Kawasaki	DNQ	DNQ	DNQ	DNQ	13	13					Ret	29	21	17	19	18			25
36	(France) Vialle	KTM							19	11							29	32	10	DNS	23
37	(Spain) Ubach	KTM	25	31	DNQ	DNQ	27	15	18	27			17	19	18	DNS	20	24	31	17	23
38	(Czech Republic) Neugebauer	Kawasaki															3	Ret			20
39	(United Kingdom) Spinks	KTM																	4	19	20
40	(Netherlands) Kras	KTM			20	5															17
41	(Switzerland) Steffen	Honda															24	Ret	19	7	16
42	(Italy) Isdraele	Yamaha															25	29	27	6	15
43	(Belgium) Getteman	Kawasaki	6	Ret	Ret	Ret															15
44	(Italy) Furbetta	KTM	7	28	DNQ	DNQ	30	20	22	22			Ret	26							15
45	(Russia) Lopatin	KTM			DNQ	DNQ					15	12									15
46	(Sweden) Jönsson	Husqvarna			12	15															15
47	(Denmark) Meier	KTM	23	21	22	13			15	Ret									Ret	Ret	14
48	(United Kingdom) Anderson	KTM			14	14															14
49	(France) Bres	KTM															8	Ret	Ret	DNS	13
50	(Spain) Villanueva	Yamaha	19	12									Ret	24							11
51	(Finland) Numminen	Husqvarna					12	Ret													9
52	(Finland) Kytonen	KTM	DNQ	DNQ	DNQ	DNQ	24	27	36	30	14	20	30	28	30	24	32	28	DNQ	DNQ	8
53	(Denmark) Bøgh Damm	Kawasaki					18	24	35	28			24	Ret	27	16	Ret	23	DNQ	DNQ	8
54	(Czech Republic) Polak	KTM																	24	14	7
55	(Poland) Staszkiewicz	KTM	DNQ	DNQ	DNQ	DNQ	25	14	30	29							DNQ	DNQ			7
56	(Italy) Bertuzzi	KTM	36	14	DNQ	DNQ			33	25			DNQ	DNQ			DNQ	DNQ	DNQ	DNQ	7
57	(Netherlands) van Berkel	Husqvarna																	14	DNS	7
58	(Spain) Casas	Yamaha	DNQ	DNQ	DNQ	DNQ							Ret	27	20	21	26	15	30	Ret	7
59	(Lithuania) Karka	KTM	DNQ	DNQ	DNQ	DNQ	28	Ret	DNQ	DNQ	17	18	21	31	31	26	DNQ	DNQ	DNQ	DNQ	7
60	(Slovakia) Kohut	KTM															18	17	Ret	Ret	7
61	(United Kingdom) Todd	Husqvarna	15	22	30	Ret															6
62	(Italy) Iacopi	Yamaha																	DNQ	15	6
63	(Denmark) Gryning	KTM			25	24	16	Ret													5
64	(Italy) Moroni	KTM	30	16					Ret	31											5
65	(France) Rubini	Kawasaki	16	32	DNQ	DNQ															5
66	(France) Clochet	Suzuki	38	Ret																	5
66	(France) Clochet	Kawasaki							16	33											5
67	(Estonia) Mägi	Kawasaki	DNQ	DNQ	24	20	17	Ret													5
68	(Belgium) Brackman	Husqvarna			DNQ	DNQ			20	17											5
69	(Russia) Shershnev	Husqvarna									18	22									3
70	(Italy) Quarti	KTM	31	37	DNQ	DNQ			DNQ	DNQ			31	32	26	18	DNQ	DNQ	DNQ	DNQ	3
71	(Netherlands) Conijn	Kawasaki	DNQ	DNQ	31	21	31	19	DNQ	DNQ			29	20	Ret	28	34	26	DNQ	DNQ	3
72	(Russia) Nesytykh	Yamaha									19	21									2
73	(Netherlands) Nijenhuis	Kawasaki	33	35	23	19															2
74	(United Kingdom) Dickinson	Yamaha															23	19			2
75	(Liechtenstein) Bruggmann	Yamaha			DNQ	DNQ	DNQ	29	25	34			25	25			27	20			1
76	(Italy) Cislaghi	KTM	20	33	27	Ret											33	33	25	Ret	1
77	(Russia) Strelkov	KTM									20	Ret									1
78	(Italy) Mantovani	Yamaha													33	20	35	34			1
	(Australia) Grothues	Husqvarna	DNQ	DNQ	DNQ	DNQ							DNQ	Ret	24	22	31	21	DNQ	DNQ	0
	(Russia) Aguzarov	Kawasaki									21	Ret									0
	(Belgium) Willems	Husqvarna																	21	Ret	0
	(Netherlands) Ebben	Yamaha	34	38	26	DSQ	Ret	30					DNQ	22			DNQ	DNQ			0
	(Estonia) Nermann	KTM					22	Ret													0
	(Latvia) Drevinskis	KTM					23	23													0
	(Italy) Bersanelli	Yamaha	DNQ	DNQ					23	32			27	Ret							0
	(Spain) Bussot	Husqvarna	DNQ	DNQ	DNQ	DNQ	32	28	DNQ	DNQ			28	30	32	23	DNQ	DNQ			0
	(Netherlands) Schoenmakers	Husqvarna			28	23															0
	(Norway) Agard-Michelsen	TM			DNQ	DNQ							32	Ret			DNQ	25	DNQ	DNQ	0
	(Finland) Silander	KTM					26	32													0
	(Netherlands) van Heugten	Kawasaki			32	27															0
	(Spain) Castro	Kawasaki	DNQ	DNQ	DNQ	DNQ									Ret	27					0
	(Portugal) Charrua	Yamaha													34	29					0
	(Estonia) Priidel	KTM					29	Ret													0
	(United Kingdom) Woodcock	Kawasaki																	29	Ret	0
	(Switzerland) Schoch	Yamaha							DNQ	DNQ							30	31			0
	(Portugal) Sergio	Yamaha													35	30					0
	(Switzerland) Auberson	KTM															Ret	30			0
	(Spain) Rosell	Yamaha													DNQ	31					0
	(Belgium) Vermijl	Kawasaki			33	32			DNQ	DNQ							DNQ	DNQ	DNQ	DNQ	0
	(Italy) Martelli	KTM	DNQ	DNQ									33	Ret			DNQ	DNQ			0
	(Belgium) Verbruggen	Yamaha			34	Ret															0
	(United Kingdom) Holyoake	Husqvarna							34	Ret											0
	(Italy) Cenerelli	Husqvarna											34	Ret							0
	(Sweden) Nilsson	KTM			35	Ret															0
	(France) Jamet	Yamaha	DNQ	DNQ					Ret	Ret											0
	(Spain) S. Fernandez	Honda													Ret	Ret			DNQ	DNQ	0
	(Belgium) Wybo	Husqvarna							Ret	Ret											0
	(France) Strubhart-Moreau	Kawasaki																	Ret	Ret	0
	(France) Verhaeghe	KTM																	Ret	Ret	0
	(Estonia) Jakobson	Kawasaki					Ret	DNS													0
	(Belgium) Roose	Yamaha	DNQ	DNQ	DNQ	DNQ	DNQ	DNQ	DNQ	DNQ			DNQ	DNQ							0
	(France) Lepan	Yamaha							DNQ	DNQ			DNQ	DNQ	DNQ	DNQ	DNQ	DNQ			0
	(Latvia) Snikers	Yamaha			DNQ	DNQ	DNQ	DNQ											DNQ	DNQ	0
	(Austria) Perkhofer	KTM					DNQ	DNQ					DNQ	DNQ			DNQ	DNQ			0
	(United Kingdom) Gregory	KTM	DNQ	DNQ	DNQ	DNQ															0
	(Sweden) Kahrle	KTM	DNQ	DNQ	DNQ	DNQ															0
	(Sweden) Olsson	KTM	DNQ	DNQ	DNQ	DNQ															0
	(Iceland) Reynisson	Kawasaki	DNQ	DNQ	DNQ	DNQ															0
	(Netherlands) van der Linden	Yamaha	DNQ	DNQ	DNQ	DNQ															0
	(France) Chanavat	Yamaha	DNQ	DNQ					DNQ	DNQ											0
	(Russia) Guryev	KTM	DNQ	DNQ													DNQ	DNQ			0
	(South Africa) Cox	KTM			DNQ	DNQ			DNQ	DNQ											0
	(Belgium) Tytgat	Yamaha			DNQ	DNQ			DNQ	DNQ											0
	(Netherlands) Bolink	Yamaha			DNQ	DNQ											DNQ	DNQ			0
	(Norway) Mindreboe	Yamaha			DNQ	DNQ											DNQ	DNQ			0
	(France) Collignon	Honda							DNQ	DNQ			DNQ	DNQ							0
	(Switzerland) Seiler	KTM							DNQ	DNQ									DNQ	DNQ	0
	(Switzerland) Jucker	KTM											DNQ	DNQ			DNQ	DNQ			0
	(Italy) Tamai	KTM											DNQ	DNQ			DNQ	DNQ			0
	(Switzerland) Freidig	Husqvarna											DNQ	DNQ					DNQ	DNQ	0
	(France) Bompar	KTM															DNQ	DNQ	DNQ	DNQ	0
	(Switzerland) Chanton	KTM															DNQ	DNQ	DNQ	DNQ	0
	(France) Giraud	KTM	DNQ	DNQ																	0
	(Slovakia) Sikyna	KTM	DNQ	DNQ																	0
	(Italy) Ermini	Husqvarna	DNQ	DNQ																	0
	(Austria) Kratzer	Kawasaki	DNQ	DNQ																	0
	(Italy) Guarise	Yamaha	DNQ	DNQ																	0
	(Croatia) Crnkovic	Yamaha	DNQ	DNQ																	0
	(Sweden) Mårtensson	Husqvarna	DNQ	DNQ																	0
	(France) Dho	KTM	DNQ	DNQ																	0
	(Netherlands) van Kraaij	Yamaha	DNQ	DNQ																	0
	(Czech Republic) Teresak	KTM	DNQ	DNQ																	0
	(Belgium) Smets	KTM			DNQ	DNQ															0
	(Sweden) Wicksell	KTM			DNQ	DNQ															0
	(United Kingdom) Norris	Husqvarna			DNQ	DNQ															0
	(United Kingdom) Moffat	KTM			DNQ	DNQ															0
	(Netherlands) Hage	KTM			DNQ	DNQ															0
	(Netherlands) Griekspoor	Husqvarna			DNQ	DNQ															0
	(Sweden) Kadestam	Husqvarna			DNQ	DNQ															0
	(Netherlands) van Geldorp	KTM			DNQ	DNQ															0
	(Belgium) Gabriel	Suzuki			DNQ	DNQ															0
	(Belgium) Bielen	KTM			DNQ	DNQ															0
	(Netherlands) Aussems	Yamaha			DNQ	DNQ															0
	(United Kingdom) Robson	KTM			DNQ	DNQ															0
	(Belgium) Baloglu	KTM			DNQ	DNQ															0
	(Denmark) Kristensen	Yamaha			DNQ	DNQ															0
	(Russia) Balandin	KTM					DNQ	DNQ													0
	(Lithuania) Milevicius	Yamaha					DNQ	DNQ													0
	(France) Hebette	KTM							DNQ	DNQ											0
	(Belgium) Meersschout	Yamaha							DNQ	DNQ											0
	(Spain) Anton	Honda							DNQ	DNQ											0
	(Italy) Ghetti	Husqvarna											DNQ	DNQ							0
	(Italy) Lumina	KTM											DNQ	DNQ							0
	(Italy) Lentini	KTM											DNQ	DNQ							0
	(Italy) Nava	Kawasaki											DNQ	DNQ							0
	(Poland) Chetnicki	KTM															DNQ	DNQ			0
	(Germany) Koch	Suzuki															DNQ	DNQ			0
	(Slovakia) Jost	Kawasaki															DNQ	DNQ			0
	(Norway) Fredriksen	Honda															DNQ	DNQ			0
	(Switzerland) Scheiben	Kawasaki															DNQ	DNQ			0
	(Switzerland) Zurbrugg	Yamaha															DNQ	DNQ			0
	(Czech Republic) Drdaj	Yamaha															DNQ	DNQ			0
	(Switzerland) Burch	KTM															DNQ	DNQ			0
	(Switzerland) Gerber	KTM															DNQ	DNQ			0
	(Switzerland) Reynard	Yamaha																	DNQ	DNQ	0
	(France) Inghilleri	Yamaha																	DNQ	DNQ	0
	(France) Berry	KTM																	DNQ	DNQ	0
	(Spain) Gamboa	Yamaha																	DNQ	DNQ	0
	(Netherlands) Derks	Yamaha																	DNQ	DNQ	0
Pos	Rider	Bike	TRE (Italy)		NED (Netherlands)		LAT (Latvia)		FRA (France)		RUS (Russia)		ITA (Italy)		POR (Portugal)		SUI (Switzerland)		FRA (France)		Points

Colour	Result
Gold	Winner
Silver	Second place
Bronze	Third place
Green	Points classification
Blue	Non-points classification
Blue	Non-classified finish (NC)
Purple	Retired, not classified (Ret)
Red	Did not qualify (DNQ)
Red	Did not pre-qualify (DNPQ)
Black	Disqualified (DSQ)
White	Did not start (DNS)
White	Withdrew (WD)
White	Race cancelled (C)
Blank	Did not practice (DNP)
Blank	Did not arrive (DNA)
Blank	Excluded (EX)

=== Manufacturers Championship ===
Pos	Bike	TRE (Italy)		NED (Netherlands)		LAT (Latvia)		FRA (France)		RUS (Russia)		ITA (Italy)		POR (Portugal)		SUI (Switzerland)		FRA (France)		Points
1	Kawasaki	6	4	2	4	3	7	5	5	3	1	1	2	1	1	1	1	1	4	374
2	KTM	4	1	1	1	1	1	2	3	8	2	2	6	5	7	8	6	2	3	357
3	Yamaha	1	3	3	3	4	6	8	4	2	3	3	1	2	2	13	11	5	2	336
4	Honda	3	13	9	11	6	4	1	1	1	4	9	7	4	4	6	2	8	7	302
5	Husqvarna	15	8	7	12	12	9	4	7	18	22	10	17	10	10	7	5	11	1	200
6	Suzuki	12	27	16	31	7	Ret	7	8	6	11	15	11	11	13	15	12			129
7	TM			DNQ	DNQ							32	Ret			DNQ	25	DNQ	DNQ	0
Pos	Bike	TRE (Italy)		NED (Netherlands)		LAT (Latvia)		FRA (France)		RUS (Russia)		ITA (Italy)		POR (Portugal)		SUI (Switzerland)		FRA (France)		Points

Colour	Result
Gold	Winner
Silver	Second place
Bronze	Third place
Green	Points classification
Blue	Non-points classification
Blue	Non-classified finish (NC)
Purple	Retired, not classified (Ret)
Red	Did not qualify (DNQ)
Red	Did not pre-qualify (DNPQ)
Black	Disqualified (DSQ)
White	Did not start (DNS)
White	Withdrew (WD)
White	Race cancelled (C)
Blank	Did not practice (DNP)
Blank	Did not arrive (DNA)
Blank	Excluded (EX)

== EMX125 ==
An 8-round calendar for the 2017 season was announced on 20 October 2016. EMX125 is for riders competing on 2-stroke motorcycles of 125cc.

=== EMX125 ===
Round	Date	Grand Prix	Location	Race 1 Winner	Race 2 Winner	Round Winner	Report
1	23 April	Netherlands	Valkenswaard	(Denmark) Mikkel Haarup	(Denmark) Mikkel Haarup	(Denmark) Mikkel Haarup	Report
2	7 May	Latvia	Kegums	(France) Brian Strubhart-Moreau	(France) Brian Strubhart-Moreau	(France) Brian Strubhart-Moreau	Report
3	28 May	France	Ernee	(Norway) Kevin Horgmo	(Italy) Gianluca Facchetti	(Norway) Kevin Horgmo	Report
4	25 June	Italy	Ottobiano	(Denmark) Mikkel Haarup	(Denmark) Mikkel Haarup	(Denmark) Mikkel Haarup	Report
5	2 July	Portugal	Agueda	(Denmark) Mikkel Haarup	(Italy) Gianluca Facchetti	(Italy) Gianluca Facchetti	Report
6	6 August	Belgium	Lommel	(Denmark) Mikkel Haarup	(Denmark) Mikkel Haarup	(Denmark) Mikkel Haarup	Report
7	13 August	Switzerland	Frauenfeld	(Italy) Gianluca Facchetti	(France) Brian Strubhart-Moreau	(France) Brian Strubhart-Moreau	Report
8	20 August	Sweden	Uddevalla	(France) Brian Strubhart-Moreau	(Denmark) Mikkel Haarup	(France) Brian Strubhart-Moreau	Report

=== Participants ===
Team	Constructor	No	Rider	Rounds
Planet Advanced Racing	Husqvarna	3	(United Kingdom) Finley Beard	3
KINI KTM Junior Racing	KTM	4	(Austria) Marcel Stauffer	1–5
KINI KTM Junior Racing	KTM	91	(Switzerland) Mike Gwerder	3–8
KINI KTM Junior Racing	KTM	711	(Austria) Rene Hofer	1–8
GPR Promo MX Team	Husqvarna	5	(Netherlands) Rob van de Veerdonk	1, 6
GPR Promo MX Team	KTM	58	(South Africa) Cameron Durow	1, 3, 6
	Yamaha	7	(Italy) Pietro Salina	6–7
HSF Logistics	KTM	10	(Netherlands) Raivo Dankers	1–8
Maddii Racing	Husqvarna	11	(Italy) Alessandro Manucci	1–8
Maddii Racing	Husqvarna	22	(Italy) Gianluca Facchetti	1–8
Maddii Racing	Husqvarna	25	(Italy) Matteo Del Coco	1–8
GL12 Racing	KTM	12	(Netherlands) Mack Bouwense	1–7
WZ Racing Team	KTM	14	(Germany) Jeremy Sydow	1–8
	KTM	15	(Norway) Runar Sudmann	8
MJC Yamaha	Yamaha	16	(Sweden) Tim Edberg	1–8
MJC Yamaha	Yamaha	98	(France) Thibault Bénistant	1–8
MJC Yamaha	Yamaha	99	(Netherlands) Rick Elzinga	1–2, 4–7
	KTM	17	(Switzerland) Fabian Stutz	7
Team VHR KTM	KTM	18	(France) Jeremy Hauquier	1–2, 4–5
Team VHR KTM	KTM	100	(France) Scotty Verhaeghe	1–8
Celestini KTM	KTM	19	(San Marino) Andrea Zanotti	1–8
Celestini KTM	KTM	228	(Italy) Emilio Scuteri	1–8
	Husqvarna	21	(Belgium) Adrien Wagener	6–7
CreyMert Racing Team	KTM	24	(Norway) Kevin Horgmo	1–8
	KTM	26	(Germany) Valentino Wessling	1
Team HCR Yamaha	Yamaha	27	(United States) Slade Tressler	1
TM Racing Sweden	TM	28	(Sweden) Adam Einarsson	1–3, 6–8
	KTM	31	(Italy) Andrea Vendruscolo	4
	KTM	32	(Belgium) Emilio Vannieuwenhuyze	1
	TM	34	(Italy) Lorenzo Corti	4, 7
Team Berryli4ni	Yamaha	38	(France) Pierre Moine	3
Yamaha Motor Europe	Yamaha	41	(Romania) Krisztian Tompa	1–2, 6–8
LA-Racing	KTM	45	(Finland) Aleksi Kurvinen	2, 6, 8
	KTM	46	(Poland) Alex Banaszak	4
Hardcore Vega Solutions KTM	KTM	48	(United Kingdom) Adam Collings	1
TM Factory Racing Team	TM	50	(Italy) Paolo Lugana	1–5
TM Factory Racing Team	TM	101	(Italy) Matteo Guadagnini	1–5, 7–8
	Yamaha	55	(Netherlands) Max Schwarte	6
	KTM	63	(Switzerland) Mike Ernst	7
Denicol Oils KTM	KTM	65	(Netherlands) Wannes van de Voorde	1, 6
	Husqvarna	69	(Italy) Eugenio Barbaglia	4, 6–7
ADAC Berlin-Brandenburg	Husqvarna	70	(Germany) Maximilian Spies	6–8
Pro Grip MX-United	Yamaha	71	(United Kingdom) Christopher Mills	1–8
Pro Grip MX-United	Yamaha	464	(Sweden) Rasmus Håkonsson	1–3, 6–8
SX Equipment KTM	KTM	73	(Belgium) Romain Delbrassinne	1, 3–4
	Husqvarna	75	(Italy) Alberto Barcella	4, 7
Hitachi KTM UK	KTM	77	(United Kingdom) Jack Bintcliffe	1–6
HMX No Fear KTM	KTM	81	(Netherlands) Raf Meuwissen	1–8
Husky Sport	Husqvarna	82	(United Kingdom) Charlie Cole	1
Husqvarna MX Rookie Team	Husqvarna	84	(Netherlands) Boyd van der Voorn	6–8
Jezyk Racing Team	KTM	88	(Spain) Sergi Notario	1–7
STC Racing	Yamaha	90	(Germany) Justin Trache	1–8
Decor Son KTM	KTM	96	(Netherlands) Ryan Witlox	1, 4
Steels Dr Jack KTM	KTM	110	(Italy) Matteo Puccinelli	1–8
	KTM	114	(Norway) Frederik Roste	4
TM Racing Nederland	TM	120	(Netherlands) Brian van der Klij	1–3, 6
	Yamaha	122	(Italy) Lorenzo Ciabatti	7
JTech Racing Suzuki	Suzuki	125	(Finland) Emil Weckman	1–3
Diga KTM Junior Racing Team	KTM	125	(Finland) Emil Weckman	4–7
Diga KTM Junior Racing Team	KTM	443	(Finland) Matias Vesterinen	1–3
	KTM	128	(Denmark) Lasse Storm Junge	1, 6
	KTM	130	(Italy) Alessandro Giorgi	4
ASTES4-TESAR Yamaha	Yamaha	134	(Italy) Kevin Cristino	7
JTX Racing Team	KTM	136	(Netherlands) Loeka Thonies	1, 6
	Yamaha	145	(Netherlands) Jeroen Bussink	1
Junior Construct KTM	KTM	151	(Belgium) Ian de Sweemer	1–3
	KTM	162	(Switzerland) Casey Manini	7
	Yamaha	167	(Italy) Emanuele Lamera	4
	Husqvarna	172	(Spain) Salvador Ubach	5, 7–8
	KTM	177	(Belgium) Chiel Vanhaeren	1
JE68 KTM	KTM	180	(Sweden) Leopold Ambjörnsson	1–2, 4–8
JE68 KTM	KTM	517	(Sweden) Isak Gifting	2–5, 8
JE68 KTM	KTM	592	(Sweden) Axel Gustafsson	1, 4, 8
	KTM	200	(Latvia) Niks Niklavs Suna	1–2
LR Motorsport	KTM	211	(France) Calvin Fonvieille	1–8
	Husqvarna	212	(Austria) David Schartner	1, 7
DRT Competition	KTM	221	(Italy) Raffaele Giuzio	1–2, 4, 6–7
Silver Action KTM	KTM	223	(Italy) Andrea Bonacorsi	1, 4, 6–7
BUD Racing Kawasaki	Kawasaki	225	(France) Brian Strubhart-Moreau	1–8
Team GRY MX	TM	227	(Belgium) Storm Steensels	1, 3–4
	KTM	237	(Switzerland) Xylian Ramella	1–5
	KTM	239	(Germany) Florian Lion	3–8
A-Team Neustrelitz	KTM	244	(Germany) Max Buelow	1–3, 6–8
2MX Motoblouz Racing	Yamaha	249	(France) Matheo Miot	1, 3, 7
	Husqvarna	252	(Portugal) Alexandre Marques	7
	Husqvarna	254	(Sweden) Alex Pettersson	1
	KTM	268	(France) Thibault Maupin	1, 3
	KTM	269	(Portugal) Joao Barcelos	5
Team TM XCentric France	TM	270	(France) Tom Guyon	3
	KTM	284	(Spain) Eric Tomas	5
Ausio Yamaha	Yamaha	292	(Spain) Alex Gamboa	1–8
Marchetti Racing KTM	KTM	294	(Italy) Alessandro Facca	1–7
	Husqvarna	299	(Belgium) Maxim Sjongers	1
	Husqvarna	302	(Norway) Cornelius Tondel	8
MRT Husqvarna	Husqvarna	310	(Italy) Federico Tuani	4, 7
Prodecom Racing	Kawasaki	312	(Spain) Oriol Oliver	3–5
JD 191 KTM	KTM	313	(Czech Republic) Petr Polak	1–8
	KTM	314	(France) Antoine Alix	1
Tech 32 Racing	Husqvarna	321	(France) Nicolas Fabre	4
	KTM	322	(France) Julien Duhamel	1, 3
Team Norail Racing	Husqvarna	324	(France) Maxime Charlier	1, 3–5, 7
	Husqvarna	325	(Indonesia) Muhammad Alfarizi	1, 3, 6–7
	Husqvarna	335	(France) Enzo Polias	3
	KTM	354	(Sweden) Viking Lindstrom	1–4, 6
TMX Competition	KTM	371	(France) Timothé Berry	3
TMX Competition	KTM	428	(France) Matteo Blache	4, 7
	KTM	375	(France) Thomas Borgioli	1–3
	Husqvarna	377	(Estonia) Andreas Hiiemägi	2
	Husqvarna	391	(Sweden) Hampus Hansson	1
	Husqvarna	402	(Finland) Mauno Nieminen	2
	KTM	416	(France) Matthieu Andre	4, 7
Starmotor MX	KTM	427	(Norway) Hakon Fredriksen	8
Kytönen Motorsport	Husqvarna	430	(Finland) Wiljam Malin	1–2
MTA Motorsport	KTM	440	(Germany) Marnique Appelt	6–7
	Yamaha	460	(Belgium) Lucas Adam	1, 3–7
Olsson MX Racing	Husqvarna	468	(Sweden) Filip Olsson	1–4, 6–8
KTM Scandinavia	KTM	471	(Sweden) Emil Jönrup	2, 4
	Husqvarna	472	(Italy) Giacomo Zancarini	4
	KTM	491	(Sweden) Elias Persson	1–2, 8
I-Fly JK Racing Yamaha	Yamaha	505	(Sweden) Arvid Lüning	1–2, 4, 6–8
Team MC Montorerna	Yamaha	511	(Sweden) Hugo Johansson	8
Speedequipment Racing Sports	KTM	520	(Sweden) Edvin Hagman	1–2, 6–8
	KTM	522	(Belgium) Lars Derboven	6
GST Berlin KTM	KTM	527	(Germany) Ben Kobbelt	1, 4, 6
Team EMX Racing	KTM	602	(Sweden) Felix Boberg	1, 8
AYR Racing Team	KTM	626	(Estonia) Henry Vesilind	1–2, 4, 6
KTM Racing Estonia	KTM	651	(Estonia) Meico Vettik	1–2, 4
	KTM	701	(Russia) Svyatoslav Pronenko	2
Rockstar Energy Husqvarna	Husqvarna	722	(Denmark) Mikkel Haarup	1–8
Forsell Motor	Husqvarna	727	(Sweden) Marcus Gredinger	8
	KTM	730	(Russia) Timur Petrashin	2
Delta Yamaha	Yamaha	731	(Slovenia) Maks Mausser	1–2, 4
	Husqvarna	757	(Latvia) Rainers Zuks	1–4, 6–7
Grizzly Racing Team	KTM	772	(Belgium) Jarni Kooij	1
	KTM	774	(Belarus) Vitaly Makhnou	2
CEC Racing	KTM	778	(Sweden) Philip Norberg	8
	Yamaha	799	(Estonia) Jorgen-Matthias Talviku	2, 8
Wolff Moto Products KTM	KTM	810	(France) Yann Crnjanski	1–8
Team Utzinger	KTM	914	(Switzerland) Ronny Utzinger	7
	KTM	917	(Portugal) Abel Carreiro	5
	KTM	919	(Italy) Lorenzo Bernini	7
	KTM	940	(France) Antoine Cosse	7
	Yamaha	982	(France) Vincent Marty	3

=== Riders Championship ===
Pos	Rider	Bike	NED (Netherlands)		LAT (Latvia)		FRA (France)		ITA (Italy)		POR (Portugal)		BEL (Belgium)		SUI (Switzerland)		SWE (Sweden)		Points
1	(France) Strubhart Moreau	Kawasaki	3	2	1	1	5	3	4	4	2	2	4	2	2	1	1	2	342
2	(Denmark) Haarup	Husqvarna	1	1	17	3	14	5	1	1	1	4	1	1	3	21	5	1	301
3	(Italy) Facchetti	Husqvarna	6	5	3	17	3	1	2	2	3	1	3	3	1	2	Ret	4	294
4	(Norway) Horgmo	KTM	10	3	2	4	1	2	5	Ret	4	3	2	4	15	9	2	3	272
5	(Austria) Hofer	KTM	9	10	11	10	15	8	6	5	10	5	18	11	5	5	14	5	189
6	(Spain) Notario	KTM	4	4	10	2	16	17	14	11	15	8	10	10	9	18			151
7	(Germany) Sydow	KTM	7	Ret	7	21	10	7	16	DNS	Ret	16	9	6	7	4	22	9	134
8	(Sweden) Edberg	Yamaha	2	7	14	15	30	28	15	31	9	13	7	8	14	Ret	10	10	131
9	(Italy) Manucci	Husqvarna	5	6	Ret	16	13	14	11	19	12	26	8	Ret	21	3	8	15	124
10	(Italy) Puccinelli	KTM	22	13	4	27	19	11	8	Ret	13	11	25	14	16	11	3	12	120
11	(Italy) Scuteri	KTM	15	Ret	Ret	14	12	12	Ret	6	7	6	Ret	5	23	7	11	17	119
12	(France) Benistant	Yamaha	20	28	5	5	17	15	21	Ret	23	24	5	21	6	10	9	6	112
13	(Sweden) Gifting	KTM			6	6	8	19	3	3	5	Ret					16	Ret	106
14	(Italy) Guadagnini	TM	19	25	28	7	11	18	20	14	16	12			4	6	13	8	105
15	(San Marino) Zanotti	KTM	Ret	11	9	23	6	10	Ret	21	6	14	20	15	20	15	4	Ret	102
16	(Italy) Lugana	TM	8	8	16	12	9	13	13	8	8	15							100
17	(France) Verhaeghe	KTM	Ret	16	12	11	2	Ret	Ret	Ret	18	23	13	17	12	Ret	6	Ret	85
18	(Sweden) Olsson	Husqvarna	31	22	15	8	Ret	24	18	13			15	9	18	17	7	11	79
19	(Netherlands) Dankers	KTM	21	23	18	13	21	9	9	7	21	7	Ret	DNS	24	8	Ret	24	76
20	(United Kingdom) Mills	Yamaha	Ret	15	13	26	25	25	10	22	14	22	16	Ret	11	16	20	7	67
21	(Czech Republic) Polak	KTM	Ret	19	25	22	18	16	12	16	25	9	12	18	10	27	24	18	62
22	(France) Charlier	Husqvarna	28	20			4	20	17	12	DNS	DNS			8	13			54
23	(Sweden) Lindstrom	KTM	11	9	20	24	26	33	25	9			Ret	7					49
24	(France) Fonvieille	KTM	26	31	29	31	31	4	28	30	Ret	18	33	27	13	14	18	13	47
25	(Netherlands) Meuwissen	KTM	24	24	30	35	28	26	7	Ret	24	17	14	12	25	23	12	25	43
26	(Netherlands) Elzinga	Yamaha	12	12	DNS	DNS			19	20	33	19	6	28	26	DNS			38
27	(France) Crnjanski	KTM	23	29	26	DNS	Ret	Ret	22	15	26	10	Ret	26	22	12	Ret	14	33
28	(Finland) Weckman	Suzuki	13	21	22	20	27	23											31
28	(Finland) Weckman	KTM							23	17	22	21	11	13	Ret	DNS			31
29	(France) Guyon	TM					7	6											29
30	(Austria) Stauffer	KTM	DNQ	DNQ	8	9	Ret	Ret	Ret	Ret	19	27							27
31	(Estonia) Vettik	KTM	16	17	21	Ret			Ret	10									20
32	(Germany) Lion	KTM					29	27	DNQ	DNQ	20	25	Ret	25	DNQ	DNQ	15	16	12
33	(Spain) Oliver	Kawasaki					DNQ	DNQ	DNQ	DNQ	11	Ret							10
34	(Sweden) Einarsson	TM	18	14	DNQ	DNQ	DNQ	DNQ					DNQ	22	39	Ret	29	Ret	10
35	(Italy) del Coco	Husqvarna	32	33	38	39	Ret	36	27	23	30	35	17	16	35	20	32	28	10
36	(Sweden) Hagman	KTM	14	26	DNQ	DNQ							19	32	32	25	35	22	9
37	(Sweden) Håkansson	Yamaha	25	Ret	33	28	20	22					35	Ret	19	19	19	19	9
38	(Italy) Facca	KTM	27	18	34	18	DNQ	DNQ	Ret	Ret	28	20	24	24	28	Ret			7
39	(Romania) Tompa	Yamaha	29	27	23	33							26	20	17	22	DNQ	DNQ	5
40	(France) Hauquier	KTM	35	34	DNQ	32			Ret	24	17	Ret							4
41	(Sweden) Johansson	Yamaha															17	29	4
42	(Belgium) Kooij	KTM	17	30															4
43	(Russia) Petrashin	KTM			19	19													4
44	(Italy) Bonacorsi	KTM	DNQ	DNQ					26	18			21	34	30	24			3
45	(Latvia) Zuks	Husqvarna	34	Ret	24	30	DNQ	DNQ	24	25			23	19	38	29			2
46	(Norway) Fredriksen	KTM															25	20	1
	(France) Duhamel	KTM	DNQ	DNQ			22	21											0
	(Estonia) Talviku	Yamaha			31	37											21	32	0
	(Netherlands) Schwarte	Yamaha											22	23					0
	(Norway) Tondel	Husqvarna															23	27	0
	(Switzerland) Ramella	KTM	DNQ	DNQ	DNQ	DNQ	23	30	Ret	32	Ret	34							0
	(Finland) Kurvinen	KTM			DNQ	DNQ							DNQ	DNQ			Ret	23	0
	(France) Miot	Yamaha	DNQ	DNQ			24	31							DNQ	DNQ			0
	(Sweden) Lüning	Yamaha	DNQ	DNQ	DNQ	DNQ			DNQ	DNQ			34	29	27	26	31	25	0
	(Estonia) Hiiemagi	Husqvarna			32	25													0
	(Spain) Gamboa	Yamaha	DNQ	DNQ	DNQ	DNQ	DNQ	DNQ	DNQ	DNQ	Ret	31	DNQ	DNQ	DNQ	DNQ	34	26	0
	(Netherlands) van der Voorn	Husqvarna											32	33	33	32	26	Ret	0
	(Sweden) Jonrup	KTM			DNQ	DNQ			Ret	26									0
	(Switzerland) Gwerder	KTM					DNQ	DNQ	DNQ	DNQ	27	36	DNQ	DNQ	29	Ret	27	30	0
	(United Kingdom) Bintcliffe	KTM	DNQ	DNQ	DNQ	DNQ	DNQ	DNQ	30	27	36	33	30	Ret					0
	(Italy) Giuzio	KTM	33	Ret	27	36			DNQ	DNQ			DNQ	DNQ	DNQ	DNQ			0
	(Netherlands) Thonies	KTM	DNQ	DNQ									27	Ret					0
	(Italy) Barcella	Husqvarna							29	28					DNQ	DNQ			0
	(Germany) Appelt	KTM											28	30	34	30			0
	(France) Cosse	KTM													31	28			0
	(Sweden) Persson	KTM	DNQ	DNQ	DNQ	DNQ											28	34	0
	(Spain) Ubach	Husqvarna									35	28			DNQ	DNQ	DNQ	DNQ	0
	(Sweden) Ambjörnsson	KTM	DNQ	DNQ	DNQ	DNQ			DNQ	DNQ	29	29	DNQ	DNQ	DNQ	DNQ	DNQ	DNQ	0
	(Netherlands) van de Veerdonk	Husqvarna	DNQ	DNQ									29	35					0
	(Latvia) Suna	KTM	DNQ	DNQ	37	29													0
	(United Kingdom) Beard	Husqvarna					Ret	29											0
	(Italy) Giorgi	KTM							DNQ	29									0
	(Netherlands) Bouwense	KTM	DNQ	DNQ	DNQ	DNQ	DNQ	DNQ	DNQ	DNQ	31	30	DNQ	DNQ	DNQ	DNQ			0
	(United Kingdom) Cole	Husqvarna	30	32															0
	(Sweden) Gredinger	Husqvarna															30	35	0
	(Belgium) van de Voorde	KTM	DNQ	DNQ									31	31					0
	(Belgium) Adam	Yamaha	DNQ	DNQ			DNQ	DNQ	DNQ	DNQ	32	32	DNQ	DNQ	37	31			0
	(Germany) Buelow	KTM	DNQ	DNQ	DNQ	DNQ	DNQ	DNQ					DNQ	DNQ	DNQ	Ret	Ret	31	0
	(France) Maupin	KTM	DNQ	DNQ			33	32											0
	(France) Polias	Husqvarna					32	35											0
	(Germany) Spies	Husqvarna											DNQ	DNQ	DNQ	33	33	33	0
	(Finland) Vesterinen	KTM	DNQ	DNQ	35	38	34	Ret											0
	(France) Berry	KTM					35	34											0
	(Finland) Nieminen	KTM			36	34													0
	(Italy) Ciabatti	Yamaha													36	34			0
	(Spain) Tomas	KTM									34	37							0
	(Sweden) Gustafsson	KTM	36	35					DNQ	DNQ							DNQ	DNQ	0
	(Italy) Zancarini	Husqvarna							Ret	Ret									0
	(Germany) Trache	Yamaha	DNQ	DNQ	DNQ	DNQ	DNQ	DNQ	DNQ	DNQ	DNQ	DNQ	DNQ	DNQ	DNQ	DNQ	DNQ	DNQ	0
	(Netherlands) van der Klij	TM	DNQ	DNQ	DNQ	DNQ	DNQ	DNQ					DNQ	DNQ					0
	(Estonia) Vesilind	KTM	DNQ	DNQ	DNQ	DNQ			DNQ	DNQ			DNQ	DNQ					0
	(Indonesia) Alfarizi	Husqvarna	DNQ	DNQ			DNQ	DNQ					DNQ	DNQ	DNQ	DNQ			0
	(France) Borgioli	KTM	DNQ	DNQ	DNQ	DNQ	DNQ	DNQ											0
	(Belgium) de Sweemer	KTM	DNQ	DNQ	DNQ	DNQ	DNQ	DNQ											0
	(Slovenia) Mausser	Yamaha	DNQ	DNQ	DNQ	DNQ			DNQ	DNQ									0
	(Belgium) Delbrassinne	KTM	DNQ	DNQ			DNQ	DNQ	DNQ	DNQ									0
	(Belgium) Steensels	TM	DNQ	DNQ			DNQ	DNQ	DNQ	DNQ									0
	(South Africa) Durow	KTM	DNQ	DNQ			DNQ	DNQ					DNQ	DNQ					0
	(Germany) Kobbelt	KTM	DNQ	DNQ					DNQ	DNQ			DNQ	DNQ					0
	(Italy) Barbaglia	Husqvarna							DNQ	DNQ			DNQ	DNQ	DNQ	DNQ			0
	(Finland) Malin	Husqvarna	DNQ	DNQ	DNQ	DNQ													0
	(Netherlands) Witlox	KTM	DNQ	DNQ					DNQ	DNQ									0
	(Denmark) Junge	KTM	DNQ	DNQ									DNQ	DNQ					0
	(Austria) Schartner	Husqvarna	DNQ	DNQ											DNQ	DNQ			0
	(Sweden) Boberg	KTM	DNQ	DNQ													DNQ	DNQ	0
	(France) Blache	Yamaha							DNQ	DNQ					DNQ	DNQ			0
	(Italy) Tuani	Husqvarna							DNQ	DNQ					DNQ	DNQ			0
	(France) Andre	KTM							DNQ	DNQ					DNQ	DNQ			0
	(Italy) Corti	TM							DNQ	DNQ					DNQ	DNQ			0
	(Italy) Salina	Yamaha											DNQ	DNQ	DNQ	DNQ			0
	(Belgium) Wagener	Husqvarna											DNQ	DNQ	DNQ	DNQ			0
	(Netherlands) Bussink	Yamaha	DNQ	DNQ															0
	(Belgium) Vannieuwenhuyze	KTM	DNQ	DNQ															0
	(France) Alix	KTM	DNQ	DNQ															0
	(United Kingdom) Collings	Husqvarna	DNQ	DNQ															0
	(Sweden) Pettersson	Husqvarna	DNQ	DNQ															0
	(United States) Tressler	Yamaha	DNQ	DNQ															0
	(Sweden) Hansson	Husqvarna	DNQ	DNQ															0
	(Belgium) Vanhaeren	KTM	DNQ	DNQ															0
	(Belgium) Sjongers	Husqvarna	DNQ	DNQ															0
	(Germany) Wessling	KTM	DNQ	DNQ															0
	(Belarus) Makhnou	KTM			DNQ	DNQ													0
	(Russia) Pronenko	KTM			DNQ	DNQ													0
	(France) Moine	Yamaha					DNQ	DNQ											0
	(France) Marty	Yamaha					DNQ	DNQ											0
	(Italy) Vendruscolo	KTM							DNQ	DNQ									0
	(Norway) Roste	KTM							DNQ	DNQ									0
	(France) Fabre	Husqvarna							DNQ	DNQ									0
	(Poland) Banaszak	KTM							DNQ	DNQ									0
	(Italy) Lamera	Yamaha							DNQ	DNQ									0
	(Portugal) Barcelos	KTM									DNQ	DNQ							0
	(Portugal) Carreiro	KTM									DNQ	DNQ							0
	(Belgium) Derboven	KTM											DNQ	DNQ					0
	(Switzerland) Utzinger	KTM													DNQ	DNQ			0
	(Switzerland) Ernst	KTM													DNQ	DNQ			0
	(Switzerland) Manini	KTM													DNQ	DNQ			0
	(Switzerland) Stutz	KTM													DNQ	DNQ			0
	(Italy) Bernini	KTM													DNQ	DNQ			0
	(Portugal) Marques	Husqvarna													DNQ	DNQ			0
	(Italy) Cristino	Yamaha													DNQ	DNQ			0
	(Sweden) Norberg	KTM															DNQ	DNQ	0
	(Norway) Sudmann	KTM															DNQ	DNQ	0
Pos	Rider	Bike	NED (Netherlands)		LAT (Latvia)		FRA (France)		ITA (Italy)		POR (Portugal)		BEL (Belgium)		SUI (Switzerland)		SWE (Sweden)		Points

Colour	Result
Gold	Winner
Silver	Second place
Bronze	Third place
Green	Points classification
Blue	Non-points classification
Blue	Non-classified finish (NC)
Purple	Retired, not classified (Ret)
Red	Did not qualify (DNQ)
Red	Did not pre-qualify (DNPQ)
Black	Disqualified (DSQ)
White	Did not start (DNS)
White	Withdrew (WD)
White	Race cancelled (C)
Blank	Did not practice (DNP)
Blank	Did not arrive (DNA)
Blank	Excluded (EX)

=== Manufacturers Championship ===
Pos	Bike	NED (Netherlands)		LAT (Latvia)		FRA (France)		ITA (Italy)		POR (Portugal)		BEL (Belgium)		SUI (Switzerland)		SWE (Sweden)		Points
1	Husqvarna	1	1	3	3	3	1	1	1	1	1	1	1	1	2	5	1	373
2	Kawasaki	3	2	1	1	5	3	4	4	2	2	4	2	2	1	1	2	342
3	KTM	4	3	2	2	1	2	3	3	4	3	2	4	5	4	2	3	323
4	Yamaha	2	7	5	5	17	15	10	20	9	13	5	8	6	10	9	6	192
5	TM	8	8	16	7	7	6	13	8	8	12	DNQ	22	4	6	13	8	171
6	Suzuki	13	21	22	20	27	23											9
Pos	Bike	NED (Netherlands)		LAT (Latvia)		FRA (France)		ITA (Italy)		POR (Portugal)		BEL (Belgium)		SUI (Switzerland)		SWE (Sweden)		Points

Colour	Result
Gold	Winner
Silver	Second place
Bronze	Third place
Green	Points classification
Blue	Non-points classification
Blue	Non-classified finish (NC)
Purple	Retired, not classified (Ret)
Red	Did not qualify (DNQ)
Red	Did not pre-qualify (DNPQ)
Black	Disqualified (DSQ)
White	Did not start (DNS)
White	Withdrew (WD)
White	Race cancelled (C)
Blank	Did not practice (DNP)
Blank	Did not arrive (DNA)
Blank	Excluded (EX)

== EMX300 ==
A 6-round calendar for the 2017 season was announced on 20 October 2016. EMX300 is for riders competing on 2-stroke motorcycles between 200-300cc.

=== EMX300 ===
Round	Date	Grand Prix	Location	Race 1 Winner	Race 2 Winner	Round Winner	Report
1	21 May	Germany	Teutschenthal	(United Kingdom) Brad Anderson	(United Kingdom) Brad Anderson	(United Kingdom) Brad Anderson	Report
2	11 June	Russia	Orlyonok	(United Kingdom) Brad Anderson	(Netherlands) Mike Kras	(United Kingdom) Brad Anderson	Report
3	25 June	Italy	Ottobiano	(United Kingdom) James Dunn	(United Kingdom) Brad Anderson	(United Kingdom) Brad Anderson	Report
4	6 August	Belgium	Lommel	(United Kingdom) Brad Anderson	(Netherlands) Mike Kras	(Netherlands) Mike Kras	Report
5	13 August	Switzerland	Frauenfeld	(United Kingdom) James Dunn	(United Kingdom) Brad Anderson	(United Kingdom) James Dunn	Report

=== Participants ===
Team	Constructor	No	Rider	Rounds
GL12 Racing	KTM	1	(Netherlands) Mike Kras	1–5
GL12 Racing	KTM	2	(United Kingdom) James Dunn	1, 3–5
GDI KTM	KTM	3	(Netherlands) Rick Satink	4
Lakerveld Racing	Yamaha	4	(Netherlands) Jacky Tausch	4
Lakerveld Racing	Yamaha	188	(Netherlands) Joshua van der Linden	4
	Husqvarna	6	(Italy) Matteo Zecchin	1, 3
	Yamaha	7	(Belgium) Pierrot Junior Slegers	1
JRD MX Team	KTM	10	(Netherlands) Tim Mulder	1, 3–5
Rockstar Energy Husqvarna	Husqvarna	20	(Belgium) Yentel Martens	1
Rockstar Energy Husqvarna	Husqvarna	400	(Finland) Jami Numminen	1–2
	KTM	21	(Netherlands) Mitchel Hoenson	4–5
Hastenberg Racing	Yamaha	22	(Netherlands) Tom Meijer	1, 3–4
	KTM	25	(Netherlands) Wessel Bosch	4
	KTM	27	(Belgium) Martin Vanleeuw	1
Bikesport Newcastle KTM	KTM	28	(United Kingdom) John Robson	4–5
Bessonov Racing	Yamaha	37	(Ukraine) Andrey Bessonov	1–5
	Honda	42	(Russia) Iurii Lukash	2
Denicol KTM	KTM	53	(Belgium) Greg Smets	1, 3–5
Sarholz Racing KTM	KTM	55	(Germany) Patrick Bender	1, 5
	KTM	57	(Belgium) Mathias Plessers	1, 3–5
	KTM	58	(Netherlands) Patrick Vos	1–2
Verde Sports Racing	KTM	60	(United Kingdom) Brad Anderson	1–5
Yamaha Keskus	Yamaha	62	(Estonia) Andero Lusbo	1–5
SEC Construction KTM Racing	KTM	67	(Netherlands) Kevin van Geldorp	1–2, 4–5
SEC Construction KTM Racing	KTM	430	(Finland) Valterri Malin	1–5
Buitenhuis Racing	Yamaha	77	(Netherlands) Kevin Buitenhuis	3–4
Revolution Racing Team	Husqvarna	80	(San Marino) Thomas Marini	1–3, 5
MDM Racing	KTM	82	(Italy) Manuel Beconcini	1, 3, 5
CreyMert Racing	KTM	92	(Belgium) Ken Craeghs	1, 3–5
	Husqvarna	98	(Belgium) Erik Willems	1–5
M2R Tuning	KTM	99	(Netherlands) Stefan Hage	1
	Yamaha	100	(Poland) Pawel Morawski	1
	KTM	101	(Italy) Tomas Ragadini	3
DAM Racing KTM	KTM	103	(Belgium) Kenny Vandueren	1–5
RC Motorhomes	KTM	106	(United Kingdom) Will Worden	1, 3–5
	KTM	109	(Italy) Riccardo Cencioni	1, 3–5
Moto Club Lion	Husqvarna	114	(Italy) Alessio Della Mora	1, 3–5
	KTM	119	(Netherlands) Jonny Karst	4
	Husqvarna	121	(Netherlands) Mitchel van den Essenburg	4
Marchetti Racing KTM	KTM	124	(Switzerland) Christopher Valente	1–2
Team Ecomaxx	KTM	125	(Netherlands) Michael Hool	3–4
Derks MX Racing	Yamaha	132	(Netherlands) Jarno Derks	5
JTX KTM	KTM	150	(Netherlands) Sven te Dorsthorst	4–5
Italian Factory KTM	KTM	385	(Italy) Sebastian Zenato	1, 3
Janssen Racing Products	KTM	160	(Netherlands) Michel Otten	3–4
Janssen Racing Products	KTM	941	(Netherlands) Jeffrey Meurs	1
Apico CPS Husqvarna	Husqvarna	172	(United Kingdom) Robert Holyoake	1, 3–5
HSF Logistics	KTM	192	(Netherlands) John Cuppen	1–5
IDS Chambers KTM	KTM	200	(United Kingdom) Phil Mercer	1, 3–5
BV Racing CZ	ČZ	201	(Czech Republic) Frantisek Smola	1, 3
	KTM	202	(Sweden) Tobias Sorensson	1
	KTM	212	(Belgium) Gordano Natale	3–5
	KTM	213	(Belgium) Giles Goethals	1
	KTM	215	(Belgium) Joey de Clercq	3–5
	Yamaha	217	(Belgium) Teun Cooymans	1, 4
	KTM	219	(Belgium) Tom Cuyvers	4
	KTM	221	(Italy) Fabio Pensini	1
	KTM	238	(Belgium) Tallon Verhelst	3–5
	KTM	246	(Netherlands) Rinnie van Linden	3–4
STC Racing	Yamaha	276	(Spain) Joan Rosell	4
	KTM	288	(Belgium) Ronny van Hove	1, 3–5
	KTM	294	(Belgium) Dean van Clapdorp	1, 4
	Husqvarna	299	(Belgium) Maxim Sjongers	4–5
	Husqvarna	300	(Italy) Jonathan Zecchin	1, 3
Foto Shop	KTM	306	(Italy) Marco Lamponi	4–5
I-Fly JK Yamaha Racing	Yamaha	371	(Italy) Manuel Iacopi	1–5
	Husqvarna	387	(United Kingdom) Aaron Pipon	1, 3–5
	KTM	537	(Netherlands) Damian Wedage	4–5
	KTM	725	(San Marino) Andrea Gorini	3, 5
	KTM	860	(Italy) Andrea La Scala	3
Hostettler Yamaha	Yamaha	906	(Switzerland) Yohan Cortijo	5
	KTM	911	(Netherlands) Henk Pater	4
	KTM	939	(Italy) Michele Cencioni	1, 3–5

=== Riders Championship ===
Pos	Rider	Bike	GER (Germany)		RUS (Russia)		ITA (Italy)		BEL (Belgium)		SUI (Switzerland)		Points
1	(United Kingdom) Anderson	KTM	1	1	1	2	2	1	1	2	3	1	236
2	(Netherlands) Kras	KTM	2	2	3	1	3	7	2	1	2	Ret	192
3	(Belgium) Vandueren	KTM	4	4	2	4	4	8	5	5	6	3	174
4	(Belgium) Willems	Husqvarna	3	3	10	5	5	6	6	11	7	6	152
5	(United Kingdom) Dunn	KTM	14	6			1	3	7	7	1	2	142
6	(Estonia) Lusbo	Yamaha	5	9	7	3	6	Ret	9	4	8	7	134
7	(Netherlands) Cuppen	KTM	9	20	6	6	7	9	13	15	11	14	100
8	(Italy) Iacopi	Yamaha	12	5	4	9	Ret	16	19	18	4	5	99
9	(San Marino) Marini	Husqvarna	13	8	8	8	Ret	17			5	8	80
10	(Finland) Malin	KTM	21	16	9	11	10	5	10	Ret	21	10	76
11	(Belgium) Smets	KTM	15	12			17	2	Ret	6	Ret	4	74
12	(Italy) Della Mora	Husqvarna	7	13			12	13	24	23	9	9	63
13	(Belgium) Plessers	KTM	10	18			8	10	11	19	13	17	62
14	(Netherlands) Hool	KTM					11	4	3	21			48
15	(United Kingdom) Holyoake	Husqvarna	Ret	11			9	11	36	16	15	Ret	43
16	(Switzerland) Valente	KTM	18	7	5	12							42
17	(Netherlands) Satink	KTM							4	3			38
18	(Netherlands) Vos	KTM	6	21	11	10							36
19	(Belgium) Natale	KTM					16	14	20	10	17	15	34
20	(United Kingdom) Pipon	Yamaha	26	14			Ret	15	22	12	Ret	11	32
21	(Belgium) Verhelst	KTM					18	26	15	17	14	12	29
22	(Netherlands) van der Linden	Yamaha							8	9			25
23	(San Marino) Gorini	KTM					15	27			10	13	25
24	(Ukraine) Bessanov	Yamaha	DNQ	35	12	7	24	24	DNQ	DNQ	28	27	23
25	(Czech Republic) Smola	ČZ	8	Ret			Ret	12					22
26	(Netherlands) Meijer	Yamaha	24	22			13	Ret	28	8			21
27	(Italy) Beconcini	KTM	16	25			26	Ret			12	16	19
28	(Netherlands) Tausch	Yamaha							12	13			17
29	(Netherlands) van Geldorp	KTM	17	17	15	DNS			18	33	26	28	17
30	(Netherlands) te Dorsthorst	KTM							14	14	23	Ret	14
31	(Netherlands) Hage	KTM	19	10									13
32	(Finland) Numminen	Husqvarna	Ret	15	14	DNS							13
33	(Italy) Zenato	KTM	11	27			Ret	Ret					10
34	(Russia) Lukash	Honda			13	DNS							8
35	(Italy) M. Cencioni	KTM	DNQ	DNQ			14	22	38	25	25	22	7
36	(United Kingdom) Worden	KTM	23	19			Ret	28	21	29	16	25	7
37	(Belgium) van Hove	KTM	31	31			22	20	16	24	29	24	6
38	(United Kingdom) Mercer	KTM	29	26			19	18	29	26	22	20	6
39	(Netherlands) Wedage	KTM							17	20	24	23	5
40	(Italy) R. Cencioni	KTM	25	23			20	30	DNQ	DNQ	20	18	5
41	(Netherlands) Derks	Yamaha									18	29	3
42	(Switzerland) Cortijo	Yamaha									19	21	2
43	(Netherlands) van Linden	KTM					Ret	19	35	27			2
44	(United Kingdom) Robson	KTM							33	Ret	Ret	19	2
45	(Italy) J. Zecchin	Husqvarna	20	24			25	Ret					1
	(Netherlands) Mulder	KTM	35	36			23	21	23	36	33	26	0
	(Netherlands) Buitenhuis	Yamaha					21	25	Ret	37			0
	(Netherlands) Bosch	KTM							25	22			0
	(Belgium) Slegers	Yamaha	22	Ret									0
	(Netherlands) Otten	KTM					29	23	34	30			0
	(Netherlands) Hoenson	KTM							26	32	34	34	0
	(Germany) Bender	KTM	28	29							27	33	0
	(Italy) M. Zecchin	Husqvarna	27	30			28	33					0
	(Belgium) Craeghs	KTM	32	33			27	31	DNQ	DNQ	31	32	0
	(Netherlands) van den Essenburg	Husqvarna							27	Ret			0
	(Netherlands) Meurs	KTM	30	28									0
	(Belgium) Cuyvers	KTM							30	28			0
	(Italy) la Scala	KTM					Ret	29					0
	(Belgium) de Clercq	KTM					Ret	32	DNQ	DNQ	30	30	0
	(Netherlands) Karst	KTM							31	31			0
	(Belgium) Sjongers	Husqvarna							DNQ	DNQ	32	31	0
	(Belgium) Goethals	KTM	33	32									0
	(Netherlands) Pater	KTM							32	34			0
	(Italy) Pensini	KTM	34	Ret									0
	(Belgium) van Clapdorp	KTM	Ret	34					DNQ	DNQ			0
	(Netherlands) Cooymans	Yamaha	DNQ	DNQ					37	35			0
	(Italy) Lamponi	KTM							DNQ	DNQ	35	Ret	0
	(Sweden) Sorensson	KTM	36	37									0
	(Belgium) Martens	Husqvarna	Ret	DNS									0
	(Italy) Ragadini	KTM					Ret	DNS					0
	(Belgium) Vanleeuw	KTM	DNQ	DNQ									0
	(Poland) Morawski	Yamaha	DNQ	DNQ									0
	(Spain) Rosell	Yamaha							DNQ	DNQ			0
Pos	Rider	Bike	GER (Germany)		RUS (Russia)		ITA (Italy)		BEL (Belgium)		SUI (Switzerland)		Points

Colour	Result
Gold	Winner
Silver	Second place
Bronze	Third place
Green	Points classification
Blue	Non-points classification
Blue	Non-classified finish (NC)
Purple	Retired, not classified (Ret)
Red	Did not qualify (DNQ)
Red	Did not pre-qualify (DNPQ)
Black	Disqualified (DSQ)
White	Did not start (DNS)
White	Withdrew (WD)
White	Race cancelled (C)
Blank	Did not practice (DNP)
Blank	Did not arrive (DNA)
Blank	Excluded (EX)

=== Manufacturers Championship ===
Pos	Bike	GER (Germany)		RUS (Russia)		ITA (Italy)		BEL (Belgium)		SUI (Switzerland)		Points
1	KTM	1	1	1	1	1	1	1	1	1	1	250
2	Husqvarna	3	3	8	5	5	6	6	11	5	6	156
3	Yamaha	5	5	4	3	6	15	8	4	4	5	156
4	ČZ	8	Ret			Ret	12					22
5	Honda			13	DNS							8
Pos	Bike	GER (Germany)		RUS (Russia)		ITA (Italy)		BEL (Belgium)		SUI (Switzerland)		Points

Colour	Result
Gold	Winner
Silver	Second place
Bronze	Third place
Green	Points classification
Blue	Non-points classification
Blue	Non-classified finish (NC)
Purple	Retired, not classified (Ret)
Red	Did not qualify (DNQ)
Red	Did not pre-qualify (DNPQ)
Black	Disqualified (DSQ)
White	Did not start (DNS)
White	Withdrew (WD)
White	Race cancelled (C)
Blank	Did not practice (DNP)
Blank	Did not arrive (DNA)
Blank	Excluded (EX)

== EMX150 ==
A 5-round calendar for the 2017 season was announced on 20 October 2016. EMX150 is for riders competing on 4-stroke motorcycles of 150cc.

=== EMX150 ===
Round	Date	Grand Prix	Location	Race 1 Winner	Race 2 Winner	Round Winner	Report
1	21 May	Germany	Teutschenthal	(Italy) Andrea Adamo	(Italy) Andrea Adamo	(Italy) Andrea Adamo	Report
2	2 July	Portugal	Agueda	(Italy) Andrea Adamo	(Sweden) Anton Nordstrom Graaf	(Sweden) Anton Nordstrom Graaf	Report
3	6 August	Belgium	Lommel	(Sweden) Anton Nordstrom Graaf	(Italy) Andrea Adamo	(Sweden) Anton Nordstrom Graaf	Report
4	20 August	Sweden	Uddevalla	(Italy) Andrea Adamo	(Italy) Andrea Adamo	(Italy) Andrea Adamo	Report
5	10 September	Netherlands	Assen	(Italy) Andrea Adamo	(Netherlands) Kjeld Stuurman	(Italy) Andrea Adamo	Report

=== Participants ===
All motorcycles are provided and operated by Honda.

No	Rider	Rounds
4	(Sweden) Melwin Bengtson	1, 3–5
5	(Australia) Marcus Youngberry	1–4
7	(Sweden) Rasmus Moen	All
8	(Spain) Yago Dominguez	All
9	(Finland) Verneri Aaltonen	1, 4–5
10	(Italy) Andrea Adamo	All
11	(Netherlands) Kjeld Stuurman	All
13	(Republic of Ireland) Charlie McCarthy	All
15	(United Kingdom) Ryan Mawhinney	1–3
17	(Switzerland) Teo Chetcuti	All
18	(Norway) Magnus Vassgaard	All
19	(Portugal) Ruben Ferreira	All
21	(Belgium) Nyls Kessen	2–5
31	(Netherlands) Milan van de Bunte	1–2
32	(Denmark) Gustav Pallesen	1
34	(Netherlands) Daan van de Bunte	5
35	(Netherlands) Boaz Bijtjes	2–5
37	(Portugal) Frederico Rocha	2
43	(Japan) Reo Linuma	5
44	(Portugal) Tomas Alves	2
45	(Belgium) Denzel Vervaet	3
46	(United Kingdom) Cain Mcelveen	1
47	(Portugal) Luis Outeiro	All
48	(Japan) Toa Kishi	All
50	(Spain) Carles Rosell	All
55	(Belgium) Wannes Ritrovato	All
61	(Netherlands) Dave Kooiker	5
63	(Japan) Shiaru Honda	2–5
64	(Bulgaria) Nikolay Malinov	1–3
66	(Sweden) Anton Nordström Graaf	All
68	(Sweden) Ville Nordström Graaf	1–4
70	(Spain) Pol Boet	All
71	(Germany) Peter Konig	1
72	(Spain) Oriol Roca	All
77	(United Kingdom) Tobias Sammut	All
84	(Netherlands) Lynn Valk	All
85	(Netherlands) Cas Valk	4–5
90	(Netherlands) Dylan Kroon	5
94	(Belgium) Senne Hermans	All
95	(Belgium) Rune Hermans	All

=== Riders Championship ===
Pos	Rider	GER (Germany)		POR (Portugal)		BEL (Belgium)		SWE (Sweden)		NED (Netherlands)		Points
1	(Italy) Adamo	1	1	1	3	15	1	1	1	1	5	217
2	(Sweden) A. Nordström Graaf	3	3	2	1	1	3	3	3	4	3	210
3	(Portugal) Outeiro	2	2	3	2	2	2	17	2	3	4	194
4	(Netherlands) Stuurman	8	8	4	4	3	5	5	5	7	1	169
5	(Netherlands) L. Valk	5	4	8	6	4	9	7	6	6	6	151
6	(Sweden) Moen	4	11	5	10	6	4	4	4	8	Ret	137
7	(Japan) Kishi	13	9	7	5	Ret	8	2	7	5	14	122
8	(Belgium) S. Hermans	15	13	13	12	10	10	12	8	14	9	94
9	(Norway) Vassgaard	20	7	12	8	Ret	11	6	18	15	8	84
10	(Bulgaria) Malinov	6	Ret	6	7	5	6					75
11	(Sweden) Bengtson	10	12			18	13	9	9	10	12	75
12	(Portugal) Ferreira	14	19	10	13	9	21	15	11	12	17	69
13	(United Kingdom) Mawhinney	12	10	9	18	7	7					63
14	(Finland) Aaltonen	9	6					10	10	Ret	11	59
15	(Netherlands) Bijtjes			14	15	8	12	13	19	11	18	58
16	(Belgium) R. Hermans	19	18	20	14	14	19	16	16	13	16	45
17	(Sweden) V. Nordström Graaf	16	15	11	Ret	Ret	15	11	17			41
18	(Netherlands) Kroon									9	2	34
19	(Netherlands) Kooiker									2	10	33
20	(Belgium) Ritrovato	24	24	26	25	12	16	20	15	17	15	31
21	(Germany) Konig	7	5									30
22	(Australia) Youngberry	21	14	15	17	13	17	23	Ret			29
23	(United Kingdom) Sammut	17	21	18	19	Ret	18	14	12	Ret	Ret	28
24	(Netherlands) C. Valk							8	Ret	Ret	7	27
25	(Netherlands) M. van de Bunte	11	16	25	9							27
26	(Belgium) Vervaet					11	14					17
27	(Spain) Dominguez	18	17	19	24	20	27	19	Ret	18	20	16
28	(Portugal) Rocha			17	11							14
29	(Spain) Roca	Ret	Ret	22	20	17	20	18	Ret	16	Ret	14
30	(Japan) Honda			21	16	Ret	25	21	13	Ret	21	13
31	(Belgium) Kessen			16	22	16	23	Ret	Ret	19	Ret	12
32	(Japan) Linuma									Ret	13	8
33	(Spain) Rosell	Ret	20	27	26	DNS	22	24	14	Ret	Ret	8
34	(Republic of Ireland) McCarthy	22	23	24	21	19	24	22	20	20	22	4
35	(Netherlands) D. van de Bunte									Ret	19	2
	(Spain) Boet	25	25	28	Ret	DNS	DNS	26	21	Ret	Ret	0
	(Denmark) Pallesen	23	22									0
	(Portugal) Alves			23	23							0
	(Switzerland) Chetcuti	DNS	DNS	Ret	27	Ret	26	25	Ret	Ret	23	0
	(United Kingdom) Mcelveen	Ret	Ret									0
Pos	Rider	GER (Germany)		POR (Portugal)		BEL (Belgium)		SWE (Sweden)		NED (Netherlands)		Points

== EMX85 ==
A 1-round calendar for the 2017 season was announced on 20 October 2016. EMX85 is for riders competing on 2-stroke motorcycles of 85cc.

=== EMX85 ===
Round	Date	Grand Prix	Location	Race 1 Winner	Race 2 Winner	Round Winner	Report
1	23 July	Czech Republic	Loket	Cancelled	Cancelled	Cancelled	Report

=== Participants ===
Riders qualify for the championship by finishing in the top 10 in one of the 4 regional 85cc championships.

No	Rider	Motorcycle
23	(Romania) Eross Koppany	KTM
28	(Hungary) Norbert Kovacs	KTM
38	(Hungary) Adam Kovacs	Yamaha
64	(Bulgaria) Nikolay Malinov	KTM
73	(Romania) Aida Cojanu	KTM
92	(Bulgaria) Viktor Neychev	KTM
104	(Hungary) Laszlo Tecsi	KTM
124	(Moldova) Nikolai Timus	Husqvarna
133	(Moldova) Igor Cuharciuc	KTM
192	(Greece) Antonis Sagmalis	KTM
200	(Switzerland) Luca Diserens	Kawasaki
204	(Italy) Andrea Rossi	Husqvarna
217	(United Kingdom) Eddie Wade	Husqvarna
248	(France) Florian Miot	Yamaha
252	(Spain) Raul Sanchez	KTM
304	(Spain) Gerard Congost	Kawasaki
319	(France) Quentin Prugnieres	KTM
344	(Italy) Pietro Razzini	Husqvarna
398	(Italy) Matteo Russi	KTM
408	(Netherlands) Scott Smulders	KTM
422	(Netherlands) Kay Karssemakers	Husqvarna
436	(Germany) Nico Greutmann	Husqvarna
456	(Denmark) Magnus Smith	KTM
484	(Netherlands) Dave Kooiker	Husqvarna
514	(Netherlands) Kay de Wolf	KTM
532	(Germany) Constantin Piller	KTM
542	(Russia) Nikita Kucherov	Kawasaki
549	(Australia) Jett Lawrence	Suzuki
555	(Sweden) Noel Nilsson	Husqvarna
568	(Sweden) Max Palsson	KTM
572	(Denmark) Rasmus Pedersen	KTM
631	(Latvia) Mairis Pumpurs	Husqvarna
641	(Ukraine) Semen Nerush	KTM
700	(Russia) Egor Frolov	KTM
715	(Estonia) Romeo Karu	KTM
741	(Belarus) Daniel Valovich	KTM
750	(Russia) Nikita Petrov	KTM
765	(Latvia) Edvards Bidzans	Yamaha
791	(Russia) Anton Dyadichkin	Yamaha
795	(Russia) Daniil Kesov	KTM

=== Cancellation ===
During race 1, Moldovan rider Igor Cuharciuc succumbed to his injuries following a crash. In response the race was red flagged and the rest of the EMX85 championship cancelled.

== EMX65 ==
A 1-round calendar for the 2017 season was announced on 20 October 2016. EMX65 is for riders competing on 2-stroke motorcycles of 65cc.

=== EMX65 ===
Round	Date	Grand Prix	Location	Race 1 Winner	Race 2 Winner	Round Winner	Report
1	23 July	Czech Republic	Loket	(Netherlands) Ivano van Erp	(Denmark) Mads Fredsoe Sorensen	(Denmark) Mads Fredsoe Sorensen	Report

=== Participants ===
Riders qualify for the championship by finishing in the top 10 in one of the 4 regional 65cc championships.

No	Rider	Motorcycle
2	(Hungary) Gergo Grosz	KTM
9	(Croatia) Luka Kunic	Kawasaki
88	(Hungary) Szabolcs Beres	KTM
122	(Moldova) Mihail Golovicichin	KTM
197	(Croatia) Matija Sterpin	KTM
209	(Spain) Francisco Garcia	Husqvarna
217	(France) Mathis Valin	Husqvarna
247	(Italy) Alessandro Gaspari	KTM
248	(Spain) Alejandro Perez	Husqvarna
305	(Spain) Antonio Gallego	KTM
306	(Switzerland) Lyonel Reichl	KTM
319	(Austria) Maximilian Ernecker	Husqvarna
323	(Slovenia) Jaka Peklaj	KTM
388	(Spain) David Benitez	KTM
394	(Italy) Patrick Busatto	KTM
396	(Italy) Ferruccio Zanchi	Husqvarna
411	(Netherlands) Damian Knuiman	Husqvarna
414	(Czech Republic) Julius Mikula	KTM
419	(Belgium) Sacha Coenen	KTM
428	(Denmark) Nicolai Skovbjerg	KTM
432	(Netherlands) Ivano van Erp	KTM
454	(Finland) Kasimir Hindersson	KTM
475	(Netherlands) Bradley Mesters	Husqvarna
489	(Netherlands) Giovanni Prujimboom	KTM
493	(Belgium) Lucas Coenen	KTM
501	(Netherlands) Mirco ten Kate	KTM
515	(Denmark) Mads Fredsoe Sorensen	KTM
551	(Czech Republic) Matej Skorepa	KTM
612	(Estonia) Joosep Parn	KTM
618	(Poland) Maksymilian Chwalik	KTM
695	(Russia) Ilya Khabirov	KTM
710	(Estonia) Richard Paat	KTM
711	(Latvia) Kirils Maslovs	Husqvarna
716	(Hungary) Noel Zanocz	Husqvarna
721	(Latvia) Eriks Cauniss	KTM
747	(Russia) Semen Rybakov	KTM
774	(Belarus) Aleh Makhnou	KTM
779	(Latvia) Kārlis Reišulis	KTM
781	(Latvia) Kristers Janbergs	KTM
788	(Russia) Serafim Sukhotin	Husqvarna

=== Riders Championship ===
Pos	Rider	Motorcycle	CZE (Czech Republic)		Points
1	(Denmark) Mads Fredsoe Sorensen	KTM	3	1	45
2	(Netherlands) Damian Knuiman	Husqvarna	2	3	42
3	(Netherlands) Ivano van Erp	KTM	1	10	36
4	(Czech Republic) Julius Mikula	KTM	8	2	35
5	(Poland) Maksymilian Chwalik	KTM	5	4	34
6	(Spain) Antonio Gallego	KTM	4	8	31
7	(Hungary) Noel Zanocz	Husqvarna	9	9	24
8	(Italy) Ferruccio Zanchi	Husqvarna	7	14	21
9	(Belarus) Aleh Makhnou	KTM	12	11	19
10	(Belgium) Sacha Coenen	KTM	33	5	16
11	(Italy) Alessandro Gaspari	KTM	30	6	15
12	(Latvia) Kārlis Reišulis	KTM	10	17	15
13	(Belgium) Lucas Coenen	KTM	6	33	15
14	(Slovenia) Jaka Peklaj	KTM	40	7	14
15	(Czech Republic) Matej Skorepa	KTM	14	16	12
16	(Russia) Semen Rybakov	KTM	16	15	11
17	(Latvia) Kirils Maslovs	Husqvarna	11	20	11
18	(Croatia) Matija Sterpin	KTM	28	12	9
19	(Netherlands) Giovanni Pruijimboom	KTM	24	13	8
20	(Finland) Kasimir Hindersson	KTM	13	26	8
21	(France) Mathis Valin	Husqvarna	15	31	6
22	(Switzerland) Lyonel Reichl	KTM	19	18	5
23	(Spain) Francisco Garcia	Husqvarna	17	Ret	4
24	(Estonia) Joosep Parn	KTM	18	24	3
25	(Spain) Alejandro Perez	Husqvarna	38	19	2
26	(Italy) Patrick Busatto	KTM	20	23	1
Pos	Rider	Motorcycle	CZE (Czech Republic)		Points

Colour	Result
Gold	Winner
Silver	Second place
Bronze	Third place
Green	Points classification
Blue	Non-points classification
Blue	Non-classified finish (NC)
Purple	Retired, not classified (Ret)
Red	Did not qualify (DNQ)
Red	Did not pre-qualify (DNPQ)
Black	Disqualified (DSQ)
White	Did not start (DNS)
White	Withdrew (WD)
White	Race cancelled (C)
Blank	Did not practice (DNP)
Blank	Did not arrive (DNA)
Blank	Excluded (EX)
