= Phillip Ward =

American football player (born 1974)

No. 55, 58
- Position: Linebacker

Personal information
- Born: November 1, 1974 (age 52); Gardena, California, U.S.
- Listed height: 6 ft 2 in (1.88 m)
- Listed weight: 235 lb (107 kg)

Career information
- High school: Pius X (Downey, California)
- College: UCLA
- NFL draft: 1997: undrafted

Career history
- Indianapolis Colts (1997); Detroit Lions (1998)*; St. Louis Rams (1998); → Berlin Thunder (1999); New Orleans Saints (2000)
- * Offseason or practice squad member only

Career NFL statistics
- Games played: 4
- Stats at Pro Football Reference

Phillip Eugene Ward (born November 1, 1974) is an American former professional football player who was a linebacker in the National Football League (NFL) for the Indianapolis Colts, St. Louis Rams and New Orleans Saints. He also was a member of the Berlin Thunder in NFL Europe. He was signed by the Indianapolis Colts as an undrafted free agent in 1997. He played college football for the UCLA Bruins.

== Early life ==
Ward attended Pius X High School. As a senior, he broke his wrist and only played in 4 games. He also practiced baseball and basketball.

He accepted a football scholarship from the University of California, Los Angeles. As a redshirt freshman with the Bruins, he was a backup at linebacker. As a sophomore, he was named a starter at outside linebacker, tallying 56 tackles (sixth on the team), 7.5 sacks (second on the team) and 12.5 tackles for loss (second on the team).

As a junior, the team changed to a 4-3 defense and he became a starter at defensive end. He was limited with a knee injury and missed 2 games. The change wasn't a good position fit and his stats dropped to 27 tackles and one sack.

As a senior, he was a starter at outside linebacker, posting 60 tackles (second on the team) and 11 tackles for loss. Against the University of Michigan, he had 8 tackles and 2 interceptions, one of them was Tom Brady's first college football pass, which he returned for a 42-yard touchdown.

== Professional career ==
=== Indianapolis Colts ===
Ward was signed as an undrafted free agent by the Indianapolis Colts after the 1997 NFL draft. He spent the first 9 games of the season on the injured reserve list. He was waived on November 4.

=== Detroit Lions ===
On March 26, 1998, he was signed as a free agent by the Detroit Lions. He was released on August 30.

=== St. Louis Rams ===
On November 30, 1998, he was signed to the St. Louis Rams practice squad. He was promoted to the active roster on November 30. He was released on December 17. In 1999, he was allocated to the Berlin Thunder of NFL Europe. He registered 39 defensive tackles (second on the team) and 7 special teams tackles (led the team). He was released by the Rams on September 3.

=== New Orleans Saints ===
On April 7, 2000, he was signed as a free agent by the New Orleans Saints. He was released on August 27. He was signed to the practice squad. He was later promoted to the active roster. He was released on December 13.
