= Mikkel Haarup =

Danish motocross racer

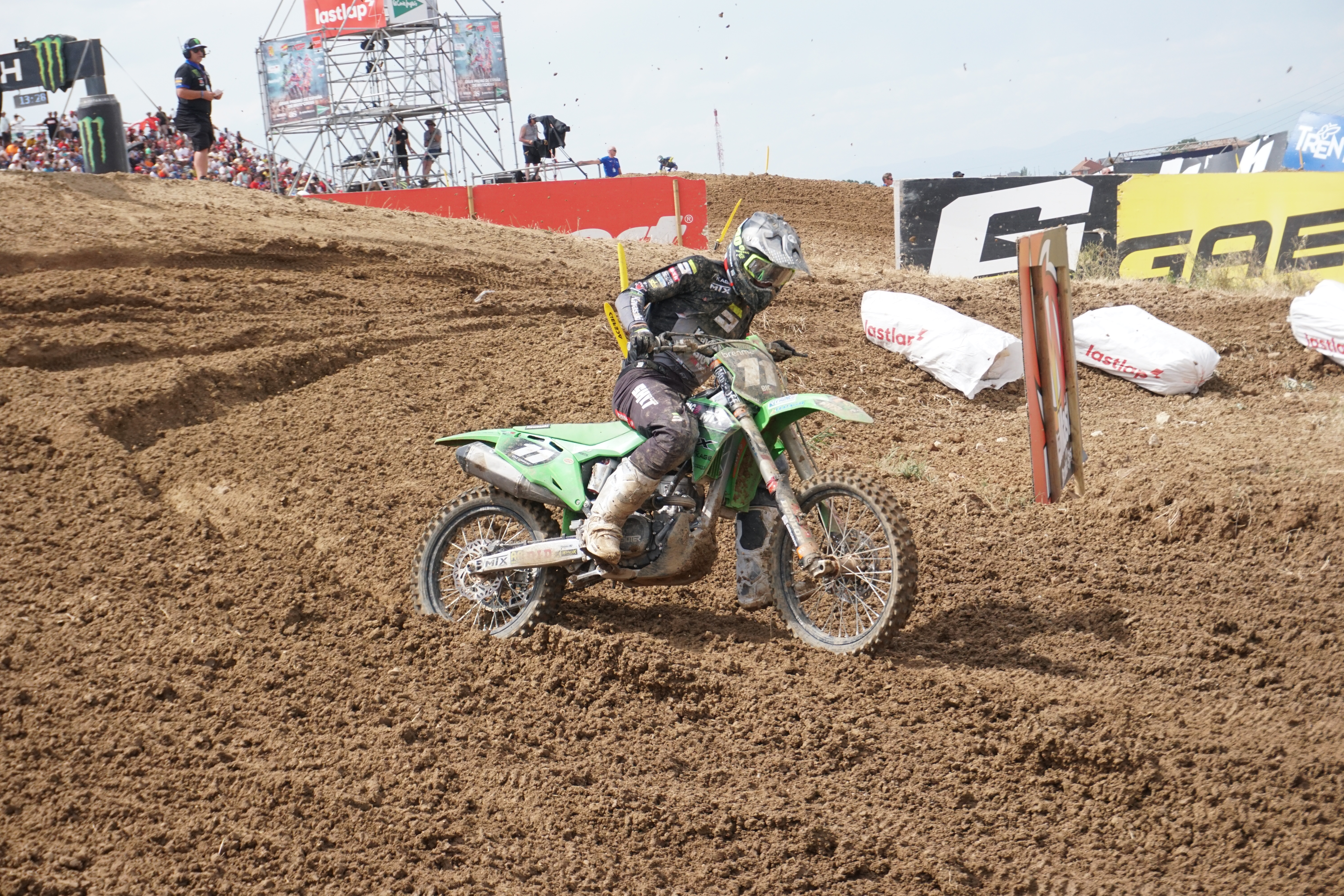
- Nationality: Danish
- Born: 15 September 2001 (age 25); Silkeborg, Denmark
- Current team: Monster Energy Triumph Racing
- Bike number: 31

Mikkel Haarup (born 15 September 2001) is a Danish professional Motocross racer. Haarup competed in the FIM Motocross World Championship from 2019 to 2024 and is anticipated to again from the 2027 season.

Haarup has represented Denmark four times at the Motocross des Nations and is a five-time podium finisher in the MX2 class of the World Championship.

In his junior career, Haarup won the 125 class in the 2017 Dutch Masters of Motocross and the Junior Cup in the 2014 ADAC MX Masters. He was also runner-up in the 125 class of both the 2017 European Motocross Championship and the 2017 FIM Motocross Junior World Championship.

Haarup was signed to ride for the Monster Energy Triumph Racing team for the 2024 FIM Motocross World Championship, making him part of Triumph's return to the sport of motocross.

For the 2025 season, Haarup joined Triumph's team in the United States, to compete in the AMA Motocross Championship. Haarup stayed in America for the 2026 season, stepping up to race a 450cc motorcycle for the first time.

== Career ==
=== Junior Career ===
Haarup began riding motocross at the age of three and upon competing at his local club and his talent soon became noticed when he was beating riders on higher capacity motorcycles. To pursue a professional career, he and his family later moved to Belgium.

Whilst riding an 85cc motorcycle, Haarup was able to finish fourth in the 2014 European Motocross Championship. Later that year, he was able to grab the bronze medal at the FIM Motocross Junior World Championship, winning the second race. In addition to this, he won 85 class 'Junior Cup' of that season's ADAC MX Masters. Following this performances in 2014, Haarup was signed by KTM to be a factory-supported rider. At the 2015 European Motocross Championship, Haarup qualified in pole position for the EMX85 class, but a not finishing the first race and a third in the second race meant he finished tenth overall.

For the 2016 season, Haarup moved up to the 125 class aboard a Husqvarna with factory backing. Haarup had a very competitive season in the EMX125 class of the 2016 European Motocross Championship. After a fourth in the second race at round two, he recorded a string of top-six results over the Spanish, French and British rounds. At the Italian round, he finished third in the second race and at the following round in Belgium, he was able to record his first overall podium with third overall. Seventh in the final standings as well as third in the Dutch Masters of Motocross 125 class showed Haarup's promise.

Haarup continued his journey with Husqvarna in 2017, starting the 2017 European Motocross Championship by winning both races at the opening round of the EMX125 class by a sizeable margin. He would repeat this feat at the fourth round in Italy and the sixth round in Belgium, as well as winning singular races at the Portuguese and Swedish rounds. These performances saw him finish runner-up to Brian Moreau in the final standings despite winning more races than him. Going to the FIM Motocross Junior World Championship, Haarup was naturally one of the favourites for the crown. He again would come away with the silver medal after placing second and third in the races. In addition to his international achievements, Haarup won the 125 class of the Dutch Master of Motocross in 2017.

=== 250 Career ===
For the 2018 European Motocross Championship, Haarup moved into the EMX250 class. He missed four rounds of the series but did record two individual race wins in Latvia and Great Britain, his win in Latvia contributing to him finishing second overall at that event. Strong performances in pre-season events such as the Hawkstone International motocross saw Husqvarna promote Haarup to the MX2 class of the 2019 FIM Motocross World Championship, after he was initially planned to stay in the EMX250 class. This proved to be a tough transition for Haarup, missing many rounds and only scoring ten points. Before the end of the year, Haarup returned to the EMX250 class of the 2019 European Motocross Championship for the final two rounds, finishing third overall in Belgium and winning the first race in Sweden.

The 2020 season marked the end of Haarup's time with Husqvarna, as he was picked up by the Dutch F&H Kawasaki team for the MX2 class of the 2020 FIM Motocross World Championship. Haarup made a competitive start to the season, finishing third overall at the opening round. After recording several other top-ten finishes, Haarup broke his thumb and missed the final eight rounds of the championship. His second season with the F&H team saw Haarup compete in every round of the MX2 class of the 2021 FIM Motocross World Championship scoring consistently in all but two races but missing the overall podium throughout. He also made his debut at the Motocross des Nations in 2021, being part of the Danish team that finished tenth overall.

Staying on Kawasaki, Haarup switch teams for the 2022 FIM Motocross World Championship, joining the British Big Van World MTX Kawasaki team. The change saw Haarup take a further step forward, securing four overall podiums, three of which came in a row from rounds three to five. An eventual final championship position of seventh was his best season to date at World Championship level. Haarup began the 2023 FIM Motocross World Championship with the same team but left after the first round in Argentina. Following his departure, Haarup signed for the German WZ Racing Team to ride a KTM. He showed good speed at times on the bike but picked up an injury at the first Indonesian round and missed the rest of the championship. In the winter following this, Haarup was announced to have signed for the much anticipated Monster Energy Triumph Racing team for his final year in the MX2 class.

Haarup debuted on the new Triumph machine at the opening round of the 2024 Spanish Motocross Championship, where he won the Saturday qualifying race before finishing second overall after the main races. His good form was carried over to the opening round of the 2024 FIM Motocross World Championship, where he was able to finish third overall in the MX2 class, securing a podium on the Grand Prix debut for Triumph. Haarup had five more top-three race finishes and a second overall at the second Indonesian round throughout the rest of the season. This contributed to him finishing fifth overall in the final standings of the MX2 class. Following this, he made his second appearance for his country at the 2024 Motocross des Nations, where his results contributed greatly to the teams eleventh-place finish in the event.

After ageing out of the MX2 class from 2024 onwards, Haarup was out of the World Championship paddock due to Triumph's factory 450cc motorcycle not being ready to compete in MXGP for 2025. Still contracted to the manufacturer, it was later announced he would race in the 250 class of the 2025 AMA National Motocross Championship. Haarup adapted to the new tracks and new style of racing quickly across the season, becoming a regular within the top-six by the mid-point of the series. A pair of fourth overalls at the sixth and seventh rounds (the latter of which saw him finish third in the second race) meant that despite missing the last two rounds due to a collarbone injury, he would still finish sixth in the final standings. After a short recovery period, Haarup represented his country at the 2025 Motocross des Nations, where the team finished twentieth in the final standings after an injury ruled out the team's MXGP class rider.

=== 450 Career ===
Haarup remained in the United States for 2026 but moved up to compete in the 450 class, being part of the team that debuted Triumph's new larger capacity motocross bike. Again focussing on outdoors, Haarup showed good speed in the class recording six top-ten overall finishes over the eleven round series. With a best of fifth overall at the penultimate round, he ended the championship in ninth. Haarup also competed in the season-ending SuperMotocross playoffs, finishing eighteenth in the standings. He was again selected to represent Denmark at the 2026 Motocross des Nations but a injury prior to the event meant he withdrew after practice.

== Honours ==
FIM Motocross Junior World Championship

- 125: 2017 (silver)
- 85: 2014 (bronze)

European Motocross Championship

- EMX125: 2017 (silver)

Dutch Masters of Motocross

- 125cc: 2017 (gold) , 2016 (bronze)

ADAC MX Masters

- Junior Cup: 2014 (gold)

Italian International Motocross Championship

- 125: 2016 (silver)

== MXGP Results ==
Year	Rnd 1	Rnd 2	Rnd 3	Rnd 4	Rnd 5	Rnd 6	Rnd 7	Rnd 8	Rnd 9	Rnd 10	Rnd 11	Rnd 12	Rnd 13	Rnd 14	Rnd 15	Rnd 16	Rnd 17	Rnd 18	Rnd 19	Rnd 20	Average Finish	Podium Percent	Place
2024 MX2	3	11	7	8	8	7	6	6	7	8	4	2	5	5	4	8	5	5	4	6	5.95	10%	5th

== AMA Motocross Results ==
Year	Rnd 1	Rnd 2	Rnd 3	Rnd 4	Rnd 5	Rnd 6	Rnd 7	Rnd 8	Rnd 9	Rnd 10	Rnd 11	Average Finish	Podium Percent	Place
2025 250 MX	15	7	9	12	6	4	4	7	6	DNF	OUT	7.78	-	6th
2026 450 MX	11 FOX (California)	9 HAN (California)	11 THU (Colorado)	7 HIG (Pennsylvania)	7 RED (Michigan)	9 SOU (Massachusetts)	DNF SPR (Minnesota)	11 WAS (Washington (state))	13 UNA (New York (state))	5 BUD (Maryland)	10 IRN (Indiana)	8.30	-	9th
