= Pius X High School (Downey, California) =

Location
- 7851 Gardendale Street; Downey, Los Angeles, California 90242; United States; 33.919496°N 118.159056°W

Information
- Type: Private
- Founded: 1953
- Headmaster: Mrs. Claudia Rodarte (Principal)
- Gender: Co-educational
- Enrollment: 552 (2024)
- Campus: Suburban
- Colors: Crimson (Red) and Gray
- Nickname: The Warriors
- Website: www.piusmatthias.org

Pius X High School (Pius X) is a co-educational, private, four year (grade levels 9-12) high school located at 7851 Gardendale Street, in the city of Downey, California. The school was founded in 1953, and named for St. Pope Pius X.

== History ==
From 1968 to 1975, Pius X entered into a revolutionary concept of modern teaching, the "Model School Project." Pius employed an educational model called "non-gradedness," which places a student in a class where his or her present achievement is the deciding factor. His success or difficulty throughout the year will enable his or her teachers to place him or her in a phase according to the student's learning capacity. Emphasis is put on progress and learning by the individual, and not a group of thirty or forty students. The student is recognized as being unique and is able to decide for himself or herself which subjects he or she wants to learn, where, from whom, and why. The student was able to enlarge his or her spectrum of learning with greater ease and efficiency, benefiting more from education.

In March 1995 the Archdiocese of Los Angeles announced a school realignment transforming Pius X, a co-ed school, into a co-institutional high school with all-girl St. Matthias High School. St. Matthias, founded in 1960, was located on Stafford Avenue and Belgrade Street in Huntington Park. The Pius X program was phased out over a three-year period.

In 2011, the St. Matthias Advisory Board and the Archdiocese asked Loyola Marymount University's ("LMU") Center for Catholic Education to conduct a detailed study on options for St. Matthias. The Center for Catholic Education study looked at how the school is achieving their Catholic education mission on this campus, with this school, at this time. Together with the Archdiocese, it was decided the best choice is to become a co-ed school once again. The school hopes to admit 25 freshman boys along with 75 freshman girls in the 2013-14 school year and change the school name to St. Pius X - St. Matthias Academy. The official change took place on July 1, 2013. Enrollment for the 2019-2020 school year was 424.

From 2017 to 2019, PMA has recently completed numerous campus renovations made possible through the generosity of Shea Family Charities and the John H. & Cynthia Lee Smet Foundation. These projects include the re-landscaping of the main building facade, the installation of a new marquee, the addition of the new PMA softball field and renovation of the baseball field, the renovation of the campus residence for Loyola Marymount University's PLACE Corps, the installation of a new athletic turf field, stadium restrooms, bleachers, concession stand and all weather track, the renovation of student restrooms, installation of HVAC system in all classrooms, and installation of new windows in the main building. In addition, the gym was renovated with new bleacher seats, new AV sound system, new scoreboards, new stage floor and curtains, and floor covering made possible through the generosity of the Dan Murphy Foundation. These projects began in the fall of 2017 and continued through Fall of 2019. Over the past four years at the school there has been tremendous growth on campus.

== Notable alumni ==
- Rick Adelman, former NBA player head coach and member, NBA Hall of Fame
- Mike Ernst, former NFL player
- Lamont Hollinquest, former NFL player with the Washington Redskins and Green Bay Packers
- Dave Lombardo, two-time Grammy Award winning drummer and co-founding member of Slayer
- Darrin Nelson, former NFL player with the Minnesota Vikings and San Diego Chargers
- Mike Paul, former MLB player
- Phillip Ward, former NFL player
- Phil Alvin, Lead singer/guitarist of The Blasters
- John Bazz, Bass guitarist of The Blasters
- Lorenzo Romar, former NBA player; head coach, University of Washington

== See also ==
- List of high schools in Los Angeles County, California
- List of high schools in California
