= Mike Ernst =

American football player (born 1950)

No. 12, 16, 17
- Position: Quarterback

Personal information
- Born: October 12, 1950; Lynwood, California, U.S.
- Listed height: 6 ft 1 in (1.85 m)
- Listed weight: 190 lb (86 kg)

Career information
- High school: Pius X (CA)
- College: Cal State-Fullerton
- NFL draft: 1972: undrafted

Career history
- Denver Broncos (1972); Cincinnati Bengals (1973–1974); Southern California Sun (1975)
- Stats at Pro Football Reference

Michael Paul Ernst (born October 12, 1950) is a former National Football League (NFL) and World Football League (WFL) quarterback who played professionally for the Denver Broncos, Cincinnati Bengals and Southern California Sun. He played college football at Cal State-Fullerton. He was not drafted out of college but was signed by the Broncos as a free agent before the 1972 season and joined the team's taxi squad. He was activated late in the season and played his first and only game for the Broncos in their season finale, entering a blowout win over the New England Patriots late in the game and leading a touchdown drive. He completed 1 of 4 passes for 10 yards.

The Broncos released Ernst right before the start of the 1973 season. He was signed by the Bengals after their first game of the 1973 season to replace Tim Van Galder as a backup to Ken Anderson and Greg Cook. He got into one game for the Bengals, a lopsided victory over the St. Louis Cardinals on November 25, but did not throw a pass. He started the 1974 season as the Bengals third-string quarterback, but was released in October after being arrested for possession of cocaine. He eventually pleaded guilty and was sentenced to one year probation. He later unsuccessfully sued the Bengals to recover the half of his $17,000 salary that had not been paid due to his release.

Ernst signed with the Southern California Sun of the World Football League for the 1975 season as a backup to Daryle Lamonica and Pat Haden. He ended up as the starting quarterback after Lamonica retired and Haden left the team to accept a Rhodes Scholarship at Oxford University. The World Football League folded after the 1975 season and Ernst attempted to join the BC Lions of the Canadian Football League for the 1976 season but was cut before the season. In 1977 he attempted to return to the NFL with the San Diego Chargers but was released before the start of the season.
