= 2018 European Motocross Championship =

The 2018 European Motocross Championship was the 30th European Motocross Championship season since it was revived in 1988. It included 16 events and 5 different classes. It started at Valkenswaard in the Netherlands on 18 April, and ended at Imola in Italy on 30 September. All rounds acted as support classes at the European rounds of the 2018 MXGP.

== EMX250 ==
An 11-round calendar for the 2018 season was announced on 25 October 2017. EMX250 is for riders competing on 4-stroke motorcycles between 175cc-250cc.

=== EMX250 ===
Round	Date	Grand Prix	Location	Race 1 Winner	Race 2 Winner	Round Winner	Report
1	25 March	Spain	Redsand	(United Kingdom) Mel Pocock	(United Kingdom) Martin Barr	(France) Pierre Goupillon	Report
2	15 April	Portugal	Agueda	(France) Mathys Boisrame	(France) Mathys Boisrame	(France) Mathys Boisrame	Report
3	1 May	Russia	Orlyonok	(France) Tom Vialle	(United Kingdom) Steven Clarke	(Italy) Nicholas Lapucci	Report
4	13 May	Latvia	Kegums	(France) Mathys Boisrame	(Denmark) Mikkel Haarup	(France) Mathys Boisrame	Report
5	3 June	Great Britain	Matterley Basin	(United Kingdom) Steven Clarke	(Denmark) Mikkel Haarup	(United Kingdom) Steven Clarke	Report
6	10 June	France	St Jean d'Angely	(France) Mathys Boisrame	(France) Pierre Goupillon	(France) Mathys Boisrame	Report
7	17 June	Italy	Ottobiano	(New Zealand) Dylan Walsh	(Australia) Jett Lawrence	(Netherlands) Roan van de Moosdijk	Report
8	5 August	Belgium	Lommel	(France) Maxime Renaux	(United Kingdom) Mel Pocock	(United Kingdom) Mel Pocock	Report
9	19 August	Switzerland	Frauenfeld	(New Zealand) Dylan Walsh	(France) Mathys Boisrame	(France) Mathys Boisrame	Report
10	26 August	Bulgaria	Sevlievo	(France) Brian Moreau	(France) Mathys Boisrame	(France) Mathys Boisrame	Report
11	16 September	Netherlands	Assen	(Australia) Jett Lawrence	(Australia) Jett Lawrence	(Australia) Jett Lawrence	Report

=== Entry list ===
Team	Constructor	No	Rider	Rounds
GL12 Racing	KTM	2	(United Kingdom) James Dunn	All
Silver Action KTM	KTM	3	(Italy) Davide Cislaghi	1
Silver Action KTM	KTM	13	(Spain) Mahi Villanueva	1–2
Silver Action KTM	KTM	22	(Italy) Gianluca Facchetti	All
Silver Action KTM	KTM	37	(Italy) Yuri Quarti	1–2, 4–9
Kini Racing KTM Junior	KTM	4	(Austria) Marcel Stauffer	7–8
ASTES4-TESAR Yamaha	Yamaha	5	(United States) Tristan Charboneau	1
ASTES4-TESAR Yamaha	Yamaha	39	(Netherlands) Roan van de Moosdijk	All
ASTES4-TESAR Yamaha	Yamaha	41	(Australia) Caleb Grothues	6–11
ASTES4-TESAR Yamaha	Yamaha	211	(Italy) Nicholas Lapucci	1–5, 7, 10–11
Becker Racing Team	Yamaha	7	(Belgium) Jarni Kooij	8–9
Becker Racing Team	Yamaha	131	(Belgium) Nolan Cordens	8
STC Racing	Kawasaki	8	(Austria) Michael Kratzer	1–7
STC Racing	Yamaha	17	(Liechtenstein) Luca Bruggmann	1, 4–5, 7–9
STC Racing	Husqvarna	276	(Spain) Joan Rosell	8
Team Green Kawasaki	Kawasaki	9	(United Kingdom) Lewis Hall	5–8
Rockstar Energy Husqvarna	Husqvarna	11	(Denmark) Mikkel Haarup	2–7, 11
Team Ausio Yamaha	Yamaha	12	(Spain) Oriol Casas	
Team Ausio Yamaha	Yamaha	292	(Spain) Alex Gamboa	1–2
Team KTM Switzerland	KTM	14	(Switzerland) Maurice Chanton	1, 7
WZ Racing	KTM	15	(Lithuania) Dovydas Karka	4, 8
WZ Racing	KTM	104	(Germany) Jeremy Sydow	All
WZ Racing	KTM	132	(Estonia) Karel Kutsar	5–6, 8, 11
WZ Racing	KTM	142	(Finland) Jere Haavisto	1
WZ Racing	KTM	637	(Latvia) Tomass Šileika	1–3
Team MX Moduls	Yamaha	16	(Latvia) Kārlis Sabulis	All
TMX Competition	KTM	18	(France) Dan Houzet	6
JLD KTM	KTM	20	(France) Jimmy Clochet	6–7
CreyMert Racing Team	KTM	24	(Norway) Kevin Horgmo	All
Theo Eggens Racing	Honda	27	(United Kingdom) Christopher Mills	1, 5–6, 8–9
	KTM	28	(Russia) Ilya Ilyukhin	3
Yamaha Europe	Yamaha	29	(Norway) Sander Agard-Michelsen	1–2, 5–6, 8–9, 11
Team Husqvarna Switzerland	Husqvarna	31	(Switzerland) Loris Freidig	
Gebben Van Venrooy Kawasaki	Kawasaki	32	(Netherlands) Marcel Conijn	1–2, 4, 6–7
Gebben Van Venrooy Kawasaki	Kawasaki	403	(Denmark) Bastian Bøgh Damm	1–2, 4–9, 11
Buildbase Honda	Honda	33	(New Zealand) Josiah Natzke	1
KMP Honda Racing	Honda	33	(New Zealand) Josiah Natzke	8, 11
	Yamaha	34	(Italy) Kevin Cristino	1, 7
Team DIGA-Procross	Husqvarna	41	(Australia) Caleb Grothues	1–4
Team DIGA-Procross	Husqvarna	51	(France) Adrien Malaval	1–3
Team DIGA-Procross	Husqvarna	53	(New Zealand) Dylan Walsh	All
Anquety FL Racing Team	Husqvarna	42	(Belgium) Tim Louis	8
LRT KTM	KTM	43	(France) Natanael Bres	1–4
LRT KTM	KTM	128	(France) Tom Vialle	9–11
LA Racing	KTM	45	(Finland) Aleksi Kurvinen	8
KTM DIGA Junior Racing	KTM	47	(Finland) Miro Sihvonen	1–2, 8–9
KTM DIGA Junior Racing	KTM	933	(Poland) Damian Kojs	1, 4–5
I-Fly JK Yamaha	Yamaha	48	(Sweden) Tim Edberg	1–2, 8
I-Fly JK Yamaha	Yamaha	714	(United Kingdom) Brad Todd	5–6, 8
I-Fly JK Yamaha	Yamaha	871	(Italy) Manuel Iacopi	6–7, 9
Team Suzuki Germany	Suzuki	49	(Australia) Jett Lawrence	1–2, 4–9, 11
REVO Husqvarna UK	Husqvarna	50	(United Kingdom) Martin Barr	All
REVO Husqvarna UK	Husqvarna	60	(United Kingdom) Dylan Woodcock	1–2, 5–7
REVO Husqvarna UK	Husqvarna	119	(United Kingdom) Mel Pocock	All
CBO Moto	Husqvarna	51	(France) Adrien Malaval	6
CBO Moto	Husqvarna	945	(France) Anthony Bourdon	1–2
MGR Motocross Team	KTM	55	(Italy) Lorenzo Corti	7
MGR Motocross Team	KTM	974	(Italy) Mario Tamai	7, 9
Patrick Walther MX Racing	Yamaha	57	(Switzerland) David Schoch	7
MX4 Dobele	Yamaha	62	(Latvia) Arnolds Sniķers	4, 8
Hitachi KTM UK	KTM	63	(United Kingdom) Oliver Benton	
Motorsport Varna	KTM	64	(Bulgaria) Nikolay Malinov	10
	Kawasaki	65	(Switzerland) Robin Scheiben	9
Apico Putoline Husqvarna	Husqvarna	66	(United Kingdom) Lewis Tombs	5
	Kawasaki	67	(Spain) Yago Martinez	1–2
	Yamaha	69	(Russia) Stanislav Myatlin	3
	KTM	71	(Russia) Daniil Shashkov	3
Sahkar Racing	KTM	75	(Estonia) Hardi Roosiorg	
Buitenhuis Racing	Yamaha	77	(Netherlands) Kevin Buitenhuis	8, 11
JWR Yamaha	Yamaha	78	(Sweden) Adrian Hellqvist	
Z&B Racing Team	Yamaha	79	(Switzerland) Cyril Zurbrügg	1, 5, 7
CEC Husqvarna Scandinavia	Husqvarna	80	(Sweden) Ken Bengtsson	8
CEC Husqvarna Scandinavia	Husqvarna	354	(Sweden) Viking Lindstrom	4, 8, 11
Husky Sport	Husqvarna	82	(United Kingdom) Charlie Cole	5
Husky Sport	Husqvarna	184	(United Kingdom) James Carpenter	5–9, 11
Carglass Honda	Honda	88	(Netherlands) Freek van der Vlist	1–4, 8–11
Carglass Honda	Honda	511	(United Kingdom) Steven Clarke	1–7
	KTM	91	(Russia) Victor Kodyrev	3
Verde Substance KTM	KTM	98	(United Kingdom) Todd Kellett	1–8, 11
Rodeo MX Racing Team	KTM	99	(Latvia) Kristers Drevinskis	4
Team VHR Racing	KTM	100	(France) Scotty Verhaeghe	2–3
Team VHR Racing	KTM	105	(Belgium) Cyril Genot	6–8
Team Husqvarna CSM Zambrana	Husqvarna	101	(Spain) Xurxo Prol	1
Genot Racing Team	KTM	105	(Belgium) Cyril Genot	4–5
Maddii Racing Team	Husqvarna	107	(Italy) Mattia Guadagnini	7
Maddii Racing Team	Husqvarna	725	(Italy) Matteo Del Coco	1, 4, 6–9, 11
Celestini KTM	KTM	110	(Italy) Matteo Puccinelli	1, 5–11
SM Action Yamaha	Yamaha	111	(Italy) Alessandro Manucci	1–2
SM Action Yamaha	Yamaha	722	(Italy) Michael Mantovani	5–10
SM Action Yamaha	Yamaha	959	(France) Maxime Renaux	1–3, 6–9
Star Motor	KTM	113	(Norway) Henrik Wahl	1
Craig's Motorcycles	Yamaha	115	(United Kingdom) Ashton Dickinson	1–2, 5–6, 8
Cofain Racing Team	KTM	116	(Austria) Manuel Perkhofer	7–8
AIT Racing Team	KTM	117	(Bulgaria) Stanislav Tsekleov	10
	Husqvarna	121	(Netherlands) Mitchel Essenburg	11
KTM Spain	KTM	124	(Spain) Simeo Ubach	1–2, 4–9, 11
CAP Racing	Husqvarna	128	(France) Tom Vialle	1–3, 5–8
Maggiora Park Racing Team	KTM	129	(Italy) Lorenzo Ravera	1–2
Estonian Express Racing Team	KTM	132	(Estonia) Karel Kutsar	1–4
Pope Racing	KTM	134	(United Kingdom) Liam Knight	1, 5
Pope Racing	KTM	575	(United Kingdom) Taylor Hammal	1, 5–6, 8
AK Motorsports	KTM	137	(Switzerland) Xylian Ramella	9
AK Motorsports	KTM	902	(Switzerland) Killian Auberson	9
MX Handel Racing	Husqvarna	138	(Germany) Bernhard Ekerold	9
2-Stroke Revolution Racing	KTM	149	(Germany) Dennis Ullrich	9
Denicol KTM	KTM	153	(Belgium) Greg Smets	8
Honda Redmoto Assomotor	Honda	172	(France) Mathys Boisrame	All
Honda Redmoto Assomotor	Honda	303	(Italy) Alberto Forato	All
Schepers Racing	KTM	173	(Denmark) Jakob Nielsen	8
Schepers Racing	KTM	424	(Netherlands) Wesley Schepers	8, 11
M Smith KTM	KTM	180	(United Kingdom) Josh Spinks	1–2, 5–7, 9–11
Mototech Kavalas	Yamaha	181	(Greece) Dimitrios Baxevanis	10
Holeshot Greenstar Kawasaki	Kawasaki	184	(United Kingdom) James Carpenter	1
Lakerveld Racing	Yamaha	189	(Netherlands) Rico Lommers	8, 11
Lakerveld Racing	Yamaha	822	(Netherlands) Mike Bolink	8, 11
MR-MAXBART Suzuki	Suzuki	197	(Italy) Gabriele Arbini	
MR-MAXBART Suzuki	Suzuki	313	(Italy) Tommaso Isdraele	5–7
Martin Racing Technology	Honda	200	(Italy) Filippo Zonta	7, 9
Ghidinelli Racing Team	Yamaha	223	(Italy) Giuseppe Tropepe	1–4, 8–9
Ghidinelli Racing Team	Yamaha	722	(Italy) Michael Mantovani	1–2
	KTM	224	(Czech Republic) Jakub Teresak	5, 9–10
BUD Racing Kawasaki	Kawasaki	225	(France) Brian Moreau	All
BUD Racing Kawasaki	Kawasaki	720	(France) Pierre Goupillon	All
VanDeLaarRacing.com	Yamaha	228	(Netherlands) Kay Ebben	8
	Husqvarna	234	(Italy) Samuele Ghetti	7, 9
Seles Moto	KTM	237	(Slovenia) Luka Milec	2, 5–8
	KTM	249	(Netherlands) Michael Van Wezel	8, 11
Speedcity Leiria	Yamaha	251	(Portugal) Bruno Charrua	2
Speedcity Leiria	Yamaha	772	(Portugal) André Sergio	2
Delta Yamaha	Yamaha	253	(Slovenia) Jan Pancar	5–11
	KTM	259	(Estonia) Johannes Nermann	4
Team Pergetti Racing	Yamaha	267	(Italy) Edoardo Bersanelli	2
Team Green Motec IDirt	Kawasaki	280	(Switzerland) Pascal Friedli	9
	KTM	282	(Sweden) Hampus Kahrle	1–2, 4–6, 8
Chambers Racing	Husqvarna	300	(United Kingdom) Ben Franklin	8
Suttel Motors Group	Husqvarna	324	(France) Maxime Charlier	6, 9
Honda Adventure Centre	Honda	326	(United Kingdom) Josh Gilbert	1
	Honda	334	(Netherlands) Kevin Kieft	11
	KTM	337	(Netherlands) Mark Boot	8
Team Experion Racing	KTM	344	(Sweden) Jesper Hultman	1, 4
Ceres 71 Yamaha	Yamaha	350	(Italy) Paolo Lugana	1–2, 4–9, 11
	Kawasaki	370	(Russia) Andrey Bessonov	3
Filten Racing Team	Yamaha	377	(Denmark) Nichlas Bjerregaard	1–2, 5–8
3MX Team	KTM	393	(Italy) Thomas Martelli	7
JRD MX Team	Husqvarna	410	(Netherlands) Tim Mulder	11
	Yamaha	411	(Romania) Krisztian Tompa	1–2, 5, 8
Star Motor	Honda	427	(Norway) Hakon Fredriksen	4, 8, 11
Apico Drysdale KTM	KTM	441	(United Kingdom) Alexander Brown	8, 11
ProGrip Yamaha MX United	Yamaha	464	(Sweden) Rasmus Hakansson	4–8
KTM Kosak Racing	KTM	472	(Denmark) Glen Meier	1–2, 4–8
EMX Racing	KTM	488	(Sweden) Jimmy Wicksell	4
Falcon Motorsports	KTM	491	(Germany) Paul Haberland	9
	KTM	500	(Russia) Aleksander Fedorov	3
Bloms MX	Husqvarna	501	(Sweden) Rasmus Andersson	4
Apico Factory Racing	Honda	511	(United Kingdom) Steven Clarke	8–11
Team JSM	Kawasaki	516	(France) Francois Dore	6
KTM Scandinavia/JE68	KTM	517	(Sweden) Isak Gifting	1–2, 4, 9
Eduardo Castro Motos	Yamaha	519	(Spain) Jose Aparicio	1–2
Dunois MX	Kawasaki	535	(France) Killian Cottereau	6
	KTM	537	(Netherlands) Damian Wedage	11
A1M Husqvarna	Husqvarna	621	(Estonia) Andero Lusbo	4
	Husqvarna	641	(Italy) Ismaele Guarise	7
	Yamaha	700	(Russia) Ilya Ryzhikh	3
	Husqvarna	701	(Russia) Svyatoslav Pronenko	3
	KTM	715	(Netherlands) Jaap Janssen	8, 11
	KTM	730	(Russia) Timur Petrashin	3, 8
Team VRT 3as	KTM	737	(France) Valentin Teillet	6
Guga MX	Suzuki	744	(Portugal) Diogo Graça	2
Hostettler Yamaha Switzerland	Yamaha	753	(Switzerland) Flavio Wolf	9
	Yamaha	761	(Russia) Sergey Prytov	3
Thermotec Racing KTM	KTM	766	(Austria) Michael Sandner	1, 4–9
	KTM	777	(Russia) David Strokov	4
Wolff Moto	KTM	810	(France) Yann Crnjanski	6–7
Team JBR	Yamaha	818	(Switzerland) Steven Champal	9
AGMX	Honda	906	(Switzerland) Yohan Cortijo	9
Pater MX Team	KTM	911	(Netherlands) Henk Pater	11
	Husqvarna	921	(Sweden) Jesper Gangfors	1, 11
	Husqvarna	941	(Netherlands) Jeffrey Meurs	8
Motorace Honda	Honda	947	(Portugal) Luis Outeiro	1–2, 8
HFour Racing Team	Kawasaki	949	(Switzerland) Alessandro Contessi	7
	Yamaha	970	(Brazil) Pedro Bueno	7
NSA Motorsport	KTM	971	(Bulgaria) Michael Ivanov	10
	Husqvarna	989	(Belgium) Erik Willems	6, 11
Motos Da Silva	TM	998	(Spain) Joaquin Camacho	1–2, 5
Marchetti Racing KTM	KTM		(Italy) Goffredo Vergari	

=== Riders Championship ===
Pos	Rider	Bike	ESP (Spain)		POR (Portugal)		RUS (Russia)		LAT (Latvia)		GBR (United Kingdom)		FRA (France)		ITA (Italy)		BEL (Belgium)		SUI (Switzerland)		BUL (Bulgaria)		NED (Netherlands)		Points
1	(France) Boisrame	Honda	15	19	1	1	8	13	1	5	5	6	1	4	2	9	6	8	4	1	2	1	19	4	366
2	(United Kingdom) Pocock	Husqvarna	1	9	4	4	DSQ	6	5	2	6	5	6	12	9	5	3	1	9	6	Ret	6	16	10	312
3	(Netherlands) van de Moosdijk	Yamaha	6	13	5	9	Ret	9	Ret	3	Ret	Ret	3	9	3	3	5	2	10	4	6	2	15	12	274
4	(United Kingdom) Barr	Husqvarna	10	1	9	7	5	7	4	4	7	4	20	10	6	12	12	6	8	8	14	21	14	8	273
5	(United Kingdom) Clarke	Honda	4	8	19	Ret	10	1	19	11	1	2	16	2	15	2	Ret	Ret	7	2	13	5	20	3	264
6	(New Zealand) Walsh	Husqvarna	5	7	7	12	4	4	9	19	11	17	11	7	1	7	19	23	1	12	11	8	Ret	Ret	243
7	(France) Moreau	Kawasaki	34	5	17	3	6	8	13	12	24	15	5	3	8	4	8	19	2	7	1	Ret	18	Ret	237
8	(France) Vialle	Husqvarna	2	4	18	Ret	1	16			2	11	2	16	20	18	29	11							227
8	(France) Vialle	KTM																	14	27	3	4	2	7	227
9	(France) Goupillon	Kawasaki	3	2	13	6	Ret	Ret	31	21	9	3	22	1	26	11	DNQ	DNQ	3	10	7	3	13	Ret	205
10	(Norway) Horgmo	KTM	31	6	30	2	Ret	19	8	8	Ret	22	14	6	4	14	2	25	26	11	18	19	3	2	191
11	(Denmark) Haarup	Husqvarna			2	25	12	10	7	1	17	1	7	13	11	Ret							8	5	171
12	(France) Renaux	Yamaha	17	12	6	8	Ret	3					8	Ret	5	8	1	3	5	17					168
13	(Australia) Lawrence	Suzuki	DNQ	DNQ	26	11			15	7	29	16	19	17	10	1	4	27	11	21			1	1	155
14	(Italy) Forato	Honda	23	Ret	16	18	7	5	25	22	10	13	9	14	23	Ret	15	9	32	23	9	10	5	15	139
15	(Latvia) Sabulis	Yamaha	DNQ	DNQ	10	20	15	11	10	16	12	10	15	29	7	6	Ret	Ret	15	13	12	11	24	27	132
16	(Germany) Sydow	KTM	33	28	20	17	Ret	17	34	10	DNS	26	35	5	16	21	9	13	22	5	15	12	4	Ret	110
17	(United Kingdom) Spinks	KTM	11	18	15	DSQ					3	8	12	24	14	10			17	3	Ret	DNS	Ret	22	103
18	(United Kingdom) Dunn	KTM	Ret	15	DNQ	DNQ	13	14	6	13	8	9	10	22	25	22	22	16	DNQ	DNQ	22	16	17	14	101
19	(Estonia) Kutsar	KTM	13	36	3	19	9	15	2	14	31	Ret	DNQ	DNQ			14	5					Ret	DNS	100
20	(Italy) Facchetti	KTM	25	Ret	12	14	Ret	12	3	6	18	19	Ret	DNS	21	Ret	Ret	DNS	16	18	4	17	Ret	18	98
21	(Italy) Tropepe	Yamaha	7	3	8	5	2	24	Ret	DNS							16	Ret	20	Ret					91
22	(Australia) Grothues	Husqvarna	14	11	14	15	17	Ret	29	23															89
22	(Australia) Grothues	Yamaha											DNQ	DNQ	DNQ	DNQ	20	12	13	22	16	13	9	9	89
23	(Italy) Lapucci	Yamaha	18	22	29	27	3	2	Ret	Ret	34	25			24	16					8	9	Ret	Ret	75
24	(Austria) Sandner	KTM	Ret	27					12	15	4	7	13	27	33	19	30	Ret	6	25					72
25	(Netherlands) van der Vlist	Honda	DNQ	DNQ	Ret	16	14	20	16	Ret							11	10	18	19	21	Ret	22	6	59
26	(United Kingdom) Kellett	KTM	DNQ	DNQ	25	Ret	19	29	27	26	15	Ret	21	11	13	20	18	26					7	13	52
27	(Sweden) Gifting	KTM	8	33	Ret	13			11	9									27	20					44
28	(Norway) Agard-Michelsen	Yamaha	DNQ	DNQ	27	21					DNQ	DNQ	DNQ	DNQ			17	4	30	28			12	11	41
29	(Belgium) Genot	KTM							14	20	16	24	18	20	22	13	13	15							39
30	(Latvia) Šileika	KTM	Ret	10	Ret	10	11	18																	35
31	(Denmark) Bøgh Damm	Kawasaki	24	17	11	24			Ret	18	26	35	30	Ret	38	23	26	18	Ret	24			11	Ret	30
32	(Denmark) Meier	KTM	22	14	23	22			18	29	23	18	24	28	12	Ret	DNQ	14							29
33	(Sweden) Bengtson	Husqvarna															7	7							28
34	(Italy) Puccinelli	KTM	DNQ	DNQ							38	32	26	31	Ret	29	27	22	Ret	32	10	7	29	20	26
35	(Belgium) Willems	Husqvarna											Ret	15									6	Ret	21
36	(Italy) Zonta	Honda													19	15			21	9					20
37	(Bulgaria) Ivanov	KTM																			5	18			19
38	(France) Teillet	KTM											4	Ret											18
39	(France) Houzet	KTM											17	8											17
40	(Austria) Kratzer	Kawasaki	21	32	Ret	28	Ret	22	30	31	13	12	Ret	DNS	34	Ret									17
41	(Germany) Ullrich	KTM																	12	14					16
42	(United Kingdom) Tombs	Husqvarna									14	14													14
43	(New Zealand) Natzke	Honda	Ret	DNS													31	24					10	19	13
44	(Slovenia) Pancar	Yamaha									30	21	28	23	28	DNS	DNQ	DNQ	29	16	20	14	32	26	13
45	(France) Bourdon	Husqvarna	9	Ret	DNQ	29																			12
46	(Finland) Sihvonen	KTM	DNQ	DNQ	22	Ret											10	30	24	DNS					11
47	(Spain) Ubach	KTM	12	20	24	30			DNQ	DNS	21	20	25	33	29	24	24	21	28	33			Ret	23	11
48	(Italy) Mantovani	Yamaha	DNQ	DNQ	DNQ	DNQ					28	31	DNQ	36	DNQ	DNQ	DNQ	DNQ	36	30	17	15			10
49	(Italy) Quarti	KTM	26	16	Ret	23			DNQ	DNQ	22	23	DNQ	DNQ	27	17	Ret	28	Ret	DNS					9
50	(United Kingdom) Brown	KTM															28	17					23	17	8
51	(United Kingdom) Knight	KTM	16	29							19	29													7
52	(Netherlands) Conijn	Kawasaki	DNQ	DNQ	DNQ	DNQ			23	17			34	26	18	26									7
53	(Liechtenstein) Bruggmann	Yamaha	DNQ	DNQ					DNQ	32	37	27			Ret	Ret	DNQ	DNQ	25	15					6
54	(France) Bres	KTM	20	35	Ret	DNS	16	21	32	25															6
55	(Netherlands) Bolink	Yamaha															DNQ	DNQ					26	16	5
56	(France) Malaval	Husqvarna	30	21	31	26	18	23					23	19											5
57	(Italy) Lugana	Yamaha	DNQ	34	DNQ	DNQ			17	24	DNQ	DNQ	DNQ	35	32	Ret	DNQ	DNQ	DNS	26			21	Ret	4
58	(Italy) Guadagnini	Husqvarna													17	28									4
59	(France) Clochet	KTM											Ret	18	35	27									3
60	(Czech Republic) Teresak	KTM									DNQ	DNQ							31	34	19	20			3
61	(Italy) Cislaghi	KTM	19	23																					2
62	(Switzerland) Auberson	KTM																	19	29					2
63	(France) Verhaeghe	KTM			21	Ret	20	30																	1
64	(Sweden) Lindstrom	Husqvarna							21	30							Ret	20					28	21	1
65	(Lithuania) Karka	KTM							20	Ret							34	31							1
66	(United Kingdom) Todd	Yamaha									20	Ret	DNQ	DNQ			DNQ	DNQ							1
	(Italy) Iacopi	Yamaha											Ret	21	30	Ret			23	Ret					0
	(Russia) Prytov	Yamaha					21	25																	0
	(Belgium) Smets	KTM															21	Ret							0
	(Russia) Pronenko	Husqvarna					22	27																	0
	(Latvia) Sniķers	Yamaha							22	27							DNQ	DNQ							0
	(Bulgaria) Malinov	KTM																			Ret	22			0
	(Bulgaria) Tsekleov	KTM																			23	23			0
	(Russia) Petrashin	KTM					23	26									DNQ	DNQ							0
	(Sweden) Hakansson	Yamaha							DNQ	DNQ	DNQ	DNQ	DNQ	DNQ	DNQ	DNQ	23	33							0
	(Norway) Fredriksen	Honda							24	35							DNQ	DNQ					25	24	0
	(Greece) Baxevanis	Yamaha																			24	24			0
	(Sweden) Kahrle	KTM	28	24	28	Ret			26	28	DNQ	DNQ	DNQ	DNQ			25	Ret							0
	(Russia) Ryzhikh	Yamaha					24	28																	0
	(Italy) Isdraele	Suzuki									25	Ret	27	32	31	25									0
	(Norway) Wahl	KTM	29	25																					0
	(United Kingdom) Woodcock	Husqvarna	DNQ	DNQ	DNQ	DNQ					32	30	32	25	DNQ	DNQ									0
	(Russia) Fedorov	KTM					25	32																	0
	(Netherlands) Essenburg	Husqvarna																					Ret	25	0
	(Russia) Bessonov	Kawasaki					26	31																	0
	(Sweden) Edberg	Yamaha	DNQ	26	32	Ret											DNQ	DNQ							0
	(United Kingdom) Carpenter	Kawasaki	DNQ	DNQ																					0
	(United Kingdom) Carpenter	Husqvarna									33	DNQ	DNQ	DNQ	DNQ	DNQ	DNQ	DNQ	34	35			27	28	0
	(United Kingdom) Hammal	KTM	DNQ	DNQ							27	28	DNQ	DNQ			DNQ	DNQ							0
	(Spain) Villanueva	KTM	27	31	Ret	DNS																			0
	(Russia) Shashkov	KTM					27	34																	0
	(Latvia) Drevinskis	KTM							28	33															0
	(Russia) Ilyukhin	Yamaha					28	35																	0
	(Italy) del Coco	Husqvarna	DNQ	DNQ					DNQ	DNQ			DNQ	DNQ	DNQ	DNQ	DNQ	DNQ	DNQ	DNQ			30	29	0
	(Denmark) Nielsen	KTM															33	29							0
	(United Kingdom) Dickinson	Yamaha	DNQ	DNQ	DNQ	DNQ					DNQ	DNQ	29	Ret			DNQ	DNQ							0
	(Netherlands) Schepers	KTM															DNQ	DNQ					31	30	0
	(Italy) Ravera	KTM	32	30	DNQ	DNQ																			0
	(France) Dore	Kawasaki											33	30											0
	(Sweden) Gangfors	Husqvarna	DNQ	DNQ																			33	31	0
	(Slovenia) Milec	KTM			Ret	Ret					36	34	31	34	37	Ret	DNQ	DNQ							0
	(France) Charlier	Husqvarna											DNQ	DNQ					35	31					0
	(United Kingdom) Mills	Honda	DNQ	DNQ							DNQ	DNQ	DNQ	DNQ			32	32	DNQ	DNQ					0
	(Denmark) Bjerregaard	Yamaha	Ret	Ret	DNQ	DNQ					35	33	DNQ	DNQ	36	Ret	Ret	Ret							0
	(Sweden) Hultman	KTM	DNQ	DNQ					33	Ret															0
	(Russia) Myatlin	Yamaha					Ret	33																	0
	(Switzerland) Ramella	KTM																	33	Ret					0
	(Sweden) Andersson	Husqvarna							Ret	34															0
	(Russia) Khodyrev	KTM					Ret	36																	0
	(Switzerland) Wolf	Yamaha																	DNQ	36					0
	(Germany) Haberland	KTM																	37	37					0
	(Finland) Haavisto	KTM	Ret	DNS																					0
	(Estonia) Lusbo	Husqvarna							Ret	DNS															0
	(Netherlands) Janssen	KTM															DNQ	DNQ					DNQ	DSQ	0
	(Romania) Tompa	Yamaha	DNQ	DNQ	DNQ	DNQ					DNQ	DNQ					DNQ	DNQ							0
	(United Kingdom) Hall	Kawasaki									DNQ	DNQ	DNQ	DNQ	DNQ	DNQ	DNQ	DNQ							0
	(Spain) Camacho	TM	DNQ	DNQ	DNQ	DNQ					DNQ	DNQ													0
	(Portugal) Outeiro	Honda	DNQ	DNQ	DNQ	DNQ											DNQ	DNQ							0
	(Poland) Kojs	KTM	DNQ	DNQ					DNQ	DNQ	DNQ	DNQ													0
	(Switzerland) Zürbrugg	Yamaha	DNQ	DNQ							DNQ	DNQ			DNQ	DNQ									0
	(Italy) Manucci	Yamaha	DNQ	DNQ	DNQ	DNQ																			0
	(Spain) Aparicio	Yamaha	DNQ	DNQ	DNQ	DNQ																			0
	(Spain) Martinez	Kawasaki	DNQ	DNQ	DNQ	DNQ																			0
	(Spain) Gamboa	Yamaha	DNQ	DNQ	DNQ	DNQ																			0
	(Italy) Cristino	Yamaha	DNQ	DNQ											DNQ	DNQ									0
	(Switzerland) Chanton	KTM	DNQ	DNQ											DNQ	DNQ									0
	(France) Crnjanski	KTM											DNQ	DNQ	DNQ	DNQ									0
	(Austria) Stauffer	KTM													DNQ	DNQ	DNQ	DNQ							0
	(Austria) Perkhofer	KTM													DNQ	DNQ	DNQ	DNQ							0
	(Italy) Ghetti	Husqvarna													DNQ	DNQ			DNQ	DNQ					0
	(Italy) Tamai	KTM													DNQ	DNQ			DNQ	DNQ					0
	(Belgium) Kooij	Yamaha															DNQ	DNQ	DNQ	DNQ					0
	(Netherlands) Van Wezel	KTM															DNQ	DNQ					DNQ	DNQ	0
	(Netherlands) Lommers	Yamaha															DNQ	DNQ					DNQ	DNQ	0
	(Netherlands) Buitenhuis	Yamaha															DNQ	DNQ					DNQ	DNQ	0
	(Spain) Prol	KTM	DNQ	DNQ																					0
	(United Kingdom) Gilbert	Honda	DNQ	DNQ																					0
	(United States) Charboneau	Yamaha	DNQ	DNQ																					0
	(Portugal) Graça	Suzuki			DNQ	DNQ																			0
	(Italy) Bersanelli	Yamaha			DNQ	DNQ																			0
	(Portugal) Charrua	Yamaha			DNQ	DNQ																			0
	(Portugal) Sergio	Yamaha			DNQ	DNQ																			0
	(Sweden) Wicksell	KTM							DNQ	DNQ															0
	(Estonia) Nermann	KTM							DNQ	DNQ															0
	(Russia) Strokov	KTM							DNQ	DNQ															0
	(United Kingdom) Cole	KTM									DNQ	DNQ													0
	(France) Cottereau	Kawasaki											DNQ	DNQ											0
	(Brazil) Bueno	Yamaha													DNQ	DNQ									0
	(Switzerland) Contessi	Kawasaki													DNQ	DNQ									0
	(Italy) Guarise	Husqvarna													DNQ	DNQ									0
	(Italy) Corti	KTM													DNQ	DNQ									0
	(Italy) Martelli	KTM													DNQ	DNQ									0
	(Switzerland) Schoch	Yamaha													DNQ	DNQ									0
	(Belgium) Louis	Husqvarna															DNQ	DNQ							0
	(United Kingdom) Franklin	Husqvarna															DNQ	DNQ							0
	(Netherlands) Meurs	Husqvarna															DNQ	DNQ							0
	(Netherlands) Boot	KTM															DNQ	DNQ							0
	(Belgium) Cordens	Yamaha															DNQ	DNQ							0
	(Spain) Rosell	Husqvarna															DNQ	DNQ							0
	(Netherlands) Ebben	Yamaha															DNQ	DNQ							0
	(Finland) Kurvinen	KTM															DNQ	DNQ							0
	(Switzerland) Champal	Yamaha																	DNQ	DNQ					0
	(Switzerland) Scheiben	Kawasaki																	DNQ	DNQ					0
	(Switzerland) Friedli	Kawasaki																	DNQ	DNQ					0
	(Germany) Ekerold	Husqvarna																	DNQ	DNQ					0
	(Switzerland) Cortijo	Honda																	DNQ	DNQ					0
	(Netherlands) Wedage	KTM																					DNQ	DNQ	0
	(Netherlands) Pater	KTM																					DNQ	DNQ	0
	(Netherlands) Kieft	Honda																					DNQ	DNQ	0
	(Netherlands) Mulder	Husqvarna																					DNQ	DNQ	0
Pos	Rider	Bike	ESP (Spain)		POR (Portugal)		RUS (Russia)		LAT (Latvia)		GBR (United Kingdom)		FRA (France)		ITA (Italy)		BEL (Belgium)		SUI (Switzerland)		BUL (Bulgaria)		NED (Netherlands)		Points

=== Manufacturers Championship ===
Pos	Bike	ESP (Spain)		POR (Portugal)		RUS (Russia)		LAT (Latvia)		GBR (United Kingdom)		FRA (France)		ITA (Italy)		BEL (Belgium)		SUI (Switzerland)		BUL (Bulgaria)		NED (Netherlands)		Points
1	Honda	4	8	1	1	7	1	1	5	1	2	1	2	2	2	6	8	4	1	2	1	5	3	453
2	Husqvarna	1	1	2	4	1	4	4	1	2	1	2	7	1	5	3	1	1	6	11	6	6	5	441
3	KTM	2	4	3	2	9	12	2	6	3	7	4	5	4	10	2	5	6	3	3	4	2	2	392
4	Yamaha	6	3	5	5	2	2	10	3	12	10	3	9	3	3	1	2	5	4	6	2	9	9	376
5	Kawasaki	3	2	11	3	6	8	13	12	9	3	5	1	8	4	8	18	2	7	1	3	11	28	328
6	Suzuki	DNQ	DNQ	26	11			15	7	25	16	19	17	10	1	4	27	11	21			1	1	155
7	TM	DNQ	DNQ	DNQ	DNQ					DNQ	DNQ													0
Pos	Bike	ESP (Spain)		POR (Portugal)		RUS (Russia)		LAT (Latvia)		GBR (United Kingdom)		FRA (France)		ITA (Italy)		BEL (Belgium)		SUI (Switzerland)		BUL (Bulgaria)		NED (Netherlands)		Points

== EMX125 ==
A 9-round calendar for the 2018 season was announced on 25 October 2017. EMX125 is for riders competing on 2-stroke motorcycles of 125cc.

=== EMX125 ===
Round	Date	Grand Prix	Location	Race 1 Winner	Race 2 Winner	Round Winner	Report
1	18 March	Netherlands	Valkenswaard	(Austria) Rene Hofer	(Austria) Rene Hofer	(Austria) Rene Hofer	Report
2	8 April	Italy	Pietramurata	(Finland) Emil Weckman	(Italy) Emilio Scuteri	(Italy) Emilio Scuteri	Report
3	13 May	Latvia	Kegums	(France) Thibault Benistant	(Austria) Rene Hofer	(Austria) Rene Hofer	Report
4	20 May	Germany	Teutschenthal	(Austria) Rene Hofer	(Italy) Mattia Guadagnini	(Italy) Mattia Guadagnini	Report
5	10 June	France	St Jean d'Angely	(France) Thibault Benistant	(Italy) Mattia Guadagnini	(Italy) Mattia Guadagnini	Report
6	5 August	Belgium	Lommel	(France) Thibault Benistant	(Italy) Mattia Guadagnini	(Italy) Mattia Guadagnini	Report
7	19 August	Switzerland	Frauenfeld	(France) Tom Guyon	(Italy) Mattia Guadagnini	(France) Tom Guyon	Report
8	16 September	Netherlands	Assen	(Netherlands) Kjell Verbruggen	(Netherlands) Raivo Dankers	(Netherlands) Raivo Dankers	Report

=== Entry list ===
Team	Constructor	No	Rider	Rounds
Team Grizzly Junior Racing	Yamaha	2	(Netherlands) Ryan De Beer	1–2, 6, 8
Maddii Racing Team	Husqvarna	3	(Italy) Federico Tuani	1–7
Maddii Racing Team	Husqvarna	31	(Italy) Francesco Bassi	All
Maddii Racing Team	Husqvarna	75	(Italy) Alberto Barcella	1–4, 6–8
Maddii Racing Team	Husqvarna	101	(Italy) Mattia Guadagnini	1, 3–8
GPR Promo MX Team	Husqvarna	5	(Netherlands) Rob van de Veerdonk	1–2, 4, 6–8
GPR Promo MX Team	Husqvarna	58	(South Africa) Cameron Durow	1–2, 4–5, 8
Team Moto Spies	Husqvarna	7	(Germany) Maximilian Spies	1–2, 4, 6
A1M Motorsport Husqvarna	Husqvarna	9	(Estonia) Henry Vesilind	1–3, 6–8
Team RD10	KTM	10	(Netherlands) Raivo Dankers	All
KTM Junior Racing	KTM	11	(Austria) Rene Hofer	1–5
KTM Junior Racing	KTM	239	(Germany) Lion Florian	All
KTM Junior Racing	KTM	696	(Switzerland) Mike Gwerder	1–5, 7–8
	Husqvarna	19	(Russia) Pavel Mangushev	3
	KTM	22	(Italy) Raffaele Giuzio	2–4, 6
Asso Gazval	Husqvarna	24	(France) Valentin Madoulaud	5
Interkran	Husqvarna	25	(Portugal) Alexandre Marques	4, 6
	Yamaha	26	(Switzerland) Joel Elsener	1, 4, 7
SKS Racing NL	Husqvarna	35	(Netherlands) Rick Wennekes	6
MH Racing	Husqvarna	36	(Germany) Nico Greutmann	2, 4–7
Celestini KTM	KTM	37	(Italy) Max Ratschiller	2, 4–5, 7–8
Celestini KTM	KTM	228	(Italy) Emilio Scuteri	1–2
I-Fly JK Yamaha	Yamaha	38	(Hungary) Adam Kovacs	1–6
	Husqvarna	42	(Netherlands) Twan De Weerd	6–7
MJC Yamaha	Yamaha	44	(Netherlands) Rick Elzinga	5, 7–8
MJC Yamaha	Yamaha	98	(France) Thibault Benistant	All
MJC Yamaha	Yamaha	100	(Estonia) Jorgen-Matthias Talviku	All
Vega Solutions HCR KTM	KTM	48	(United Kingdom) Adam Collings	1, 3–8
Team Cello 555	KTM	49	(Italy) Mattia Dusi	2
Lakerveld Racing	Yamaha	50	(Netherlands) Mack Bouwense	1
	Yamaha	54	(Italy) Mattia Moscatelli	2
MGR Motocross Team	KTM	55	(Italy) Lorenzo Corti	1–4, 6–8
Manchester MC Husqvarna	Husqvarna	57	(United Kingdom) Kyle McNicol	1
MX Moduls	Yamaha	60	(Latvia) Mairis Pumpurs	3
F4E Racing KTM	KTM	62	(Belgium) Killigan Delroeux	
F4E Racing KTM	KTM	65	(Belgium) Wannes Van de Voorde	1–5, 7–8
F4E Racing KTM	KTM	108	(New Zealand) James Scott	3–5
F4E Racing KTM	KTM	242	(Netherlands) Kjell Verbruggen	1–2, 5–8
F4E Racing KTM	KTM	771	(Spain) Mario Lucas	All
	KTM	64	(Bulgaria) Nikolay Malinov	All
Paez Racing	KTM	67	(Spain) Yago Martinez	6
SRG Motorsports	Husqvarna	69	(Italy) Eugenio Barbaglia	2, 6
DAM Racing	KTM	73	(Belgium) Romain Delbrassinne	1–6
DAM Racing	KTM	522	(Belgium) Lars Derboven	4, 6
Team 74	KTM	74	(Belgium) Robbe Daniels	6
Lakerveld Racing	Yamaha	77	(Netherlands) Hessel Danen	6
Lakerveld Racing	Yamaha	124	(Netherlands) Kevin Simons	6
	Yamaha	78	(Netherlands) Dean Schellen	1
EightyOne – BCS Racing	KTM	81	(Netherlands) Raf Meuwissen	All
Yamaha MX Rookie Team Nederland	Yamaha	84	(Netherlands) Boyd van der Voorn	All
STC Racing	Husqvarna	90	(Germany) Justin Trache	1–2, 4–8
STC Racing	Husqvarna	701	(Germany) Laurenz Falke	2, 4–5
Zone Rouge	Yamaha	92	(Belgium) Ryan Bonnewijn	4, 6
	Husqvarna	95	(Italy) Francesco Riolo	2
Motoextreme	KTM	105	(Estonia) Egert Pihlak	1–2
KTM DIGA Junior Racing	KTM	108	(New Zealand) James Scott	6–8
KTM DIGA Junior Racing	KTM	125	(Finland) Emil Weckman	1–6
Hardcore Yamaha	Yamaha	110	(United Kingdom) Max Ingham	1
Hardcore Yamaha	Yamaha	365	(United Kingdom) Sam Nunn	1–2, 6, 8
	KTM	111	(Italy) Mirko Dal Bosco	2, 4–5
Team Oragno 114	Husqvarna	115	(Italy) Andrea Roncoli	2
GL12 Racing	KTM	117	(United Kingdom) Ike Carter	2
	Husqvarna	119	(Italy) Gioele Palanca	2, 4, 7
Team Heli-MX Husqvarna	Husqvarna	120	(Netherlands) Brian van der Klij	1–3, 6
	KTM	131	(Czech Republic) Radim Kraus	2, 4, 7
JTX Racing	KTM	136	(Netherlands) Loeka Thonies	1, 6, 8
	Yamaha	150	(Spain) Carles Rosell	6
	TM	155	(United Kingdom) Sam Beresford	1
	KTM	162	(Switzerland) Casey Manini	1–2, 4–7
Jezyk Racing Team	KTM	165	(Spain) Adria Monne	4–8
Jezyk Racing Team	KTM	217	(United Kingdom) Eddie Jay Wade	1–7
Jezyk Racing Team	KTM	304	(Spain) Gerard Congost	1, 7
Jezyk Racing Team	KTM	312	(Spain) Oriol Oliver	3–8
	KTM	180	(Sweden) Leopold Ambjörnsson	All
	KTM	181	(Belgium) Julian Vander Auwera	1–2, 5–7
	Yamaha	188	(Russia) Vladimir Sychev	3
WZ Racing	KTM	189	(Lithuania) Danil Zhilkin	3–4, 6
KTM Racing Centre	KTM	191	(Belgium) Marnick Lagrou	6
Team Dr Jack	Husqvarna	203	(Italy) Cosimo Bellocci	
Silver Action KTM	KTM	223	(Italy) Andrea Bonacorsi	1–7
CreyMert Racing Team	KTM	224	(Spain) David Braceras	All
	KTM	232	(Italy) Mattia Capuzzo	2, 6
	Husqvarna	238	(Sweden) Viktor Andersson	
Motoblouz HB Racing	KTM	247	(France) Florian Miot	All
Motoblouz HB Racing	KTM	249	(France) Matheo Miot	All
Motoblouz HB Racing	KTM	268	(France) Thibault Maupin	All
Patrick Walther MX Racing	Yamaha	253	(Switzerland) Kevin Brumann	4, 7
Mefo Sport Racing Team	Yamaha	256	(Denmark) Magnus Smith	1–2, 6
HFour Racing Team	KTM	263	(Switzerland) Mike Ernst	7
Team VRT	KTM	270	(France) Tom Guyon	All
GBO Motorsports	KTM	281	(Italy) Riccardo Nicoli	5, 7
	Husqvarna	287	(Sweden) Pelle Gabrielsson Tell	6
Marchetti Racing KTM	KTM	294	(Italy) Alessandro Facca	2–6
Moto 17 KTM St Jean	KTM	297	(France) Pablo Metayer	5–8
Mafi Yamaha	Yamaha	299	(Sweden) Andre Högberg	
KTM Team Theiner	KTM	300	(Germany) Noah Ludwig	4
	Husqvarna	309	(Spain) Guillem Farrés	5–6
JD 191 KTM	KTM	313	(Czech Republic) Petr Polak	All
JD 191 KTM	KTM	535	(Czech Republic) Radek Vetrovsky	6–8
Diabolic Moto	Husqvarna	319	(France) Jimmy Grajwoda	5
Tech32 Racing	Husqvarna	321	(France) Nicolas Fabre	2, 6
Motostyl Meyreuil	Husqvarna	335	(France) Enzo Polias	5
Whites Transport Services	Husqvarna	338	(United Kingdom) Ben White	1
	KTM	343	(Russia) Veniamin Voronkov	3
Fiamme Oro	Husqvarna	344	(Italy) Pietro Razzini	5–7
Nilsson Training Zambrana	Husqvarna	368	(Spain) Samuel Nilsson	1–2, 5–8
	KTM	369	(France) Axel Boldrini	1–2
Team RGS	KTM	375	(France) Thomas Borgioli	2, 4–5, 7
Revolution Racing Team	KTM	381	(Spain) Rodolfo Bicalho	1–2, 4–5
Revolution Racing Team	KTM	532	(Italy) Mirko Valsecchi	1–2, 4–5, 7–8
DT Works Racing Team	KTM	384	(Spain) Eric Tomas	5, 7
	KTM	397	(Sweden) Rasmus Holm	1
SH Racing	Husqvarna	402	(Finland) Mauno Nieminen	1, 3
Kosak Racing KTM	KTM	410	(Germany) Max Thünecke	1–2
Brouwer Motors	KTM	411	(Netherlands) Kjeld Stuurman	1–2, 4, 6, 8
Vos Oss KTM Team	KTM	422	(Netherlands) Kay Karssemakers	8
ProGrip MX United	Yamaha	424	(Russia) Nikita Kucherov	1, 3–8
	KTM	427	(Czech Republic) Daniel Stehlik	2
Kytönen Motorsport	Husqvarna	430	(Finland) Wiljam Malin	1–4, 6–7
	KTM	432	(Sweden) Elix Ruth	3, 6
	KTM	433	(Belgium) Ugo Moors	7
Motokrosovaskola.cz	KTM	437	(Czech Republic) Martin Venhoda	2, 4, 6
MTA Motorsport	KTM	440	(Germany) Marnique Appelt	1–4
Moto Palvelu	KTM	443	(Finland) Matias Vesterinen	6, 8
E2T Racing	Husqvarna	447	(Israel) Suff Sella	2–5, 7–8
	KTM	460	(Belgium) Lucas Adam	1–2, 4–8
CEC Racing	Husqvarna	468	(Sweden) Filip Olsson	1
Team DIGA Procross	Husqvarna	468	(Sweden) Filip Olsson	2–8
KTM Scandinavia/CEC Racing	KTM	471	(Sweden) Emil Jönrup	1–3, 5–8
Team Westside Racing	KTM	475	(Denmark) Oliver Olsen	4, 6
SHR Motorsports	KTM	481	(Netherlands) Roel Van Ham	4
	KTM	491	(Sweden) Elias Persson	1
Karlstroms Motor KTM	KTM	505	(Sweden) Arvid Lüning	All
	Yamaha	512	(Sweden) Adrian Aminne-Karlsson	3
Pfeil Husqvarna Junior Team	Husqvarna	516	(Germany) Simon Längenfelder	All
	KTM	517	(Italy) Pablo Caspani	3–4
Duust KTM	KTM	537	(Poland) Konrad Dąbrowski	1–2
Kenneth Gundersen MX Team	Husqvarna	540	(Sweden) Axel Semb	6, 8
Je68/KTM Scandinavia	KTM	568	(Sweden) Max Pålsson	4
KTM Scandinavia/MX-Shop	KTM	572	(Denmark) Rasmus Pedersen	1, 3, 6
Tiso Blackstar Abil KTM	KTM	582	(South Africa) Cullen Scott	1, 4
Motostar Husqvarna Scandinavia	Husqvarna	592	(Sweden) Axel Gustafsson	1–3, 6–7
EMX Racing	KTM	602	(Sweden) Felix Boberg	3
EMX Racing	KTM	750	(Sweden) Samuel Flink	1–3
Sõmerpalu MK	Yamaha	611	(Estonia) Allar Pent	
TM UK	TM	615	(United Kingdom) Callum Gasson	1
	KTM	634	(Switzerland) Remo Schudel	7
	KTM	637	(France) Alizio Pinson	5
KTM Racing Estonia	KTM	651	(Estonia) Meico Vettik	1–6
TKS Racing Team	Husqvarna	680	(Germany) Lukas Fiedler	4
	KTM	700	(Russia) Egor Frolov	3
	KTM	710	(Russia) Maksim Kraev	1, 6
Falcon Motorsports Team	KTM	716	(Germany) Leon Rehberg	4
Forsell Motor	Husqvarna	727	(Sweden) Marcus Gredinger	3
Team GT243	Husqvarna	731	(Slovenia) Maks Mausser	1–7
Garin MX	KTM	741	(Belarus) Daniel Volovich	3
	Husqvarna	777	(Latvia) Ralfs-Edgars Ozoliņš	3
	KTM	790	(Russia) Grigory Dyadichkin	3, 6
	KTM	791	(Russia) Anton Dyadichkin	3, 6
Sarholz KTM	KTM	839	(Denmark) Victor Kleemann	4, 6
	Yamaha	869	(France) Arthur Vial	5
RFX Crescent Yamaha	Yamaha	912	(United Kingdom) Joel Rizzi	1, 3, 5–6
Verde Substance KTM	KTM	961	(United Kingdom) Dominic Lancett	1–6
	Husqvarna	968	(Belgium) Samuel Houyon	4
Tip Top Competition	Yamaha	982	(France) Vincent Marty	5

=== Riders Championship ===
Pos	Rider	Bike	NED (Netherlands)		TRE (Italy)		LAT (Latvia)		GER (Germany)		FRA (France)		BEL (Belgium)		SUI (Switzerland)		NED (Netherlands)		Points
1	(France) Benistant	Yamaha	5	7	6	6	1	7	4	6	1	6	1	13	5	7	20	8	249
2	(Italy) Guadagnini	Husqvarna	Ret	DNS			7	DNS	2	1	4	1	2	1	3	1	7	7	224
3	(Austria) Hofer	KTM	1	1	4	3	3	1	1	2	2	Ret							202
4	(Netherlands) Dankers	KTM	Ret	4	9	14	2	13	13	4	12	20	Ret	3	4	11	4	1	194
5	(France) Guyon	KTM	8	9	5	4	8	28	5	5	Ret	Ret	6	19	1	2	9	12	189
6	(Czech Republic) Polak	KTM	14	3	13	8	4	2	18	8	10	8	11	14	7	10	17	9	186
7	(Sweden) Olsson	Husqvarna	4	2	Ret	17	Ret	11	14	10	27	17	5	2	9	13	2	Ret	156
8	(Finland) Weckman	KTM	2	8	1	2	DNS	Ret	6	7	14	4	7	Ret					150
9	(Germany) Florian	KTM	9	16	12	7	14	6	16	9	19	7	30	15	8	14	8	10	145
10	(Netherlands) Meuwissen	KTM	10	10	8	5	10	12	10	19	17	16	8	7	24	Ret	16	5	141
11	(Spain) Lucas	KTM	3	6	20	11	13	Ret	22	13	Ret	9	24	22	12	5	5	13	123
12	(Sweden) Lüning	Yamaha	13	13	24	20	9	4	35	14	9	19	3	5	Ret	28	Ret	14	111
13	(Netherlands) Elzinga	Yamaha									3	15			2	4	3	3	106
14	(Switzerland) Gwerder	KTM	19	19	10	Ret	Ret	16	12	15	11	10			6	6	6	18	104
15	(Italy) Bonacorsi	KTM	16	20	11	15	12	9	19	22	8	12	4	4	Ret	26			103
16	(Netherlands) Verbruggen	KTM	26	5	33	23					DNQ	DNQ	13	8	19	3	1	6	99
17	(France) F. Miot	KTM	15	21	37	28	DNQ	DNQ	24	16	6	3	17	16	10	34	14	2	95
18	(United Kingdom) Wade	KTM	DNQ	DNQ	7	27	11	10	3	11	16	Ret	Ret	9	11	19			94
19	(France) M. Miot	KTM	Ret	17	23	22	19	27	9	12	Ret	2	19	6	22	12	11	15	91
20	(Germany) Längenfelder	Husqvarna	DNQ	DNQ	15	10	6	3	15	30	21	Ret	27	26	17	20	18	11	76
21	(Italy) Scuteri	KTM	7	11	2	1													71
22	(New Zealand) Scott	KTM					Ret	23	21	24	5	5	15	10	31	8	12	23	71
23	(Estonia) Vettik	KTM	25	35	3	21	22	Ret	7	3	7	Ret	Ret	DNS					68
24	(Sweden) Jönrup	KTM	17	12	21	12	Ret	DNS			32	Ret	9	11	20	24	13	Ret	53
25	(Estonia) Talviku	Yamaha	DNQ	DNQ	DNQ	DNQ	5	21	8	23	25	Ret	10	21	15	Ret	Ret	DNS	46
26	(Spain) Oliver	KTM					24	19	11	17	DNQ	DNQ	18	18	13	30	10	29	41
27	(Finland) Vesterinen	KTM											21	12			28	4	27
28	(Italy) Valsecchi	KTM	DNQ	DNQ	16	13			27	Ret	22	25			28	9	DNQ	DNQ	25
29	(Sweden) Ambjörnsson	KTM	11	14	25	19	Ret	Ret	Ret	29	DNQ	DNQ	DNQ	DNQ	DNQ	DNQ	15	27	25
30	(Italy) Facca	KTM			17	Ret	20	14	Ret	Ret	18	22	12	Ret					24
31	(Italy) Barcella	Husqvarna	DNQ	DNQ	14	16	Ret	24	17	Ret			DNQ	DNQ	30	16	DNQ	DNQ	21
32	(Spain) Braceras	KTM	24	23	DNQ	DNQ	15	8	28	27	30	Ret	DNQ	DNQ	21	25	21	22	19
33	(Belgium) Adam	KTM	DNQ	DNQ	22	31			DNQ	DNQ	31	14	16	28	16	21	26	19	19
34	(Denmark) Pedersen	KTM	DNQ	DNQ			23	5					22	20					17
35	(France) Maupin	KTM	Ret	Ret	19	Ret	DNQ	DNQ	31	Ret	13	Ret	Ret	24	14	Ret	33	28	17
36	(Netherlands) van der Klij	Husqvarna	6	Ret	DNQ	DNQ	DNQ	29					DNQ	DNQ					15
37	(Italy) Bassi	Husqvarna	DNQ	DNQ	DNQ	DNQ	28	30	36	20	35	11	DNQ	DNQ	29	17	DNQ	34	15
38	(Netherlands) Thonies	KTM	12	15									26	33			24	25	15
39	(Hungary) Kovacs	Yamaha	DNQ	DNQ	28	33	16	15	20	18	DNQ	DNQ	Ret	DNS					15
40	(Slovenia) Mausser	Husqvarna	20	22	18	26	17	25	26	26	23	18	DNQ	DNQ	27	18			14
41	(Belgium) Van de Voorde	KTM	DNQ	DNQ	27	9	29	34	DNQ	DNQ	DNQ	DNQ			DNQ	DNQ	31	31	12
42	(Sweden) Semb	Husqvarna											14	23			19	38	9
43	(South Africa) Durow	KTM	33	28	35	30			25	31	37	13					34	32	8
44	(Italy) Corti	KTM	DNQ	DNQ	32	Ret	27	33	34	21			Ret	27	23	15	36	20	7
45	(Russia) Kraev	KTM	18	26									Ret	17					7
46	(Spain) Farrés	Husqvarna									15	Ret	25	Ret					6
47	(United Kingdom) Collings	KTM	DNQ	DNQ			21	26	30	25	26	21	29	29	Ret	22	35	16	5
48	(United Kingdom) Nunn	Yamaha	27	25	30	24							DNQ	DNQ			23	17	4
49	(Italy) Giuzio	KTM			36	25	Ret	17	Ret	Ret			DNQ	DNQ					4
50	(Finland) Nieminen	Husqvarna	30	18			DNQ	20											4
51	(United Kingdom) Rizzi	Yamaha	DNQ	DNQ			25	18			DNQ	DNQ	28	Ret					3
52	(Switzerland) Brumann	Yamaha							DNQ	DNQ					18	27			3
53	(Italy) Ratschiller	KTM			31	18			DNQ	DNQ	DNQ	DNQ			DNQ	DNQ	DNQ	DNQ	3
54	(Latvia) Ozoliņš	Husqvarna					18	35											3
55	(Spain) Nilsson	Husqvarna	21	30	DNQ	DNQ					20	Ret	DNQ	DNQ	25	29	Ret	33	1
56	(Bulgaria) Malinov	KTM	DNQ	DNQ	DNQ	DNQ	DNQ	DNQ	DNQ	DNQ	DNQ	DNQ	20	25	33	33	27	26	1
	(Netherlands) Karssemakers	KTM															25	21	0
	(Sweden) Gustavsson	Husqvarna	23	34	DNQ	DNQ	26	22					DNQ	DNQ	DNQ	DNQ			0
	(Estonia) Vesilind	KTM	DNQ	29	39	35	DNQ	DNQ					DNQ	DNQ	DNQ	DNQ	22	35	0
	(Finland) Malin	Husqvarna	22	36	DNQ	DNQ	30	32	DNQ	DNQ			DNQ	DNQ	DNQ	DNQ			0
	(Netherlands) van der Voorn	Husqvarna	31	24	26	32	DNQ	DNQ	DNQ	DNQ	33	23	32	Ret	DNQ	DNQ	Ret	DNS	0
	(Germany) Spies	Husqvarna	Ret	31	DNQ	DNQ			29	32			23	30					0
	(Spain) Congost	KTM	DNQ	DNQ											32	23			0
	(Germany) Falke	Husqvarna			DNQ	DNQ			23	34	DNQ	DNQ							0
	(France) Marty	Yamaha									24	24							0
	(Netherlands) van de Veerdonk	Husqvarna	DNQ	DNQ	DNQ	DNQ			DNQ	DNQ			DNQ	DNQ	DNQ	DNQ	29	24	0
	(Switzerland) Ernst	KTM													26	31			0
	(Netherlands) Schellen	Yamaha	Ret	27															0
	(United Kingdom) Lancett	KTM	32	32	DNQ	DNQ	DNQ	DNQ	DNQ	DNQ	28	Ret	31	31					0
	(Sweden) Palsson	KTM							37	28									0
	(Netherlands) Bouwense	Yamaha	28	DSQ															0
	(Germany) Appelt	KTM	29	33	DNQ	DNQ	Ret	31	33	Ret									0
	(Denmark) Smith	Yamaha	34	37	29	36							DNQ	DNQ					0
	(Italy) Capuzzo	KTM			38	29							DNQ	DNQ					0
	(France) Polias	Husqvarna									29	Ret							0
	(Netherlands) Stuurman	KTM	DNQ	DNQ	DNQ	DNQ			DNQ	DNQ			DNQ	DNQ			30	30	0
	(Denmark) Olsen	KTM							32	33			DNQ	DNQ					0
	(Italy) Nicoli	KTM									34	Ret			36	32			0
	(Russia) Kucherov	Yamaha	DNQ	DNQ			DNQ	DNQ	DNQ	DNQ	DNQ	DNQ	DNQ	DNQ	34	Ret	32	37	0
	(Belgium) Lagrou	KTM											DNQ	32					0
	(Italy) Tuani	Husqvarna	DNQ	DNQ	34	34	DNQ	DNQ	DNQ	DNQ	DNQ	DNQ	DNQ	DNQ	DNQ	DNQ			0
	(Spain) Martinez	KTM											Ret	34					0
	(Switzerland) Manini	KTM	DNQ	DNQ	DNQ	DNQ			DNQ	DNQ	DNQ	DNQ	DNQ	DNQ	35	Ret			0
	(Italy) Razzini	Husqvarna									DNQ	DNQ	DNQ	DNQ	Ret	35			0
	(France) Metayer	KTM									36	Ret	DNQ	DNQ	DNQ	DNQ	DNQ	36	0
	(Italy) Caspani	KTM					Ret	Ret	DNQ	DNQ									0
	(Germany) Trache	Husqvarna	DNQ	DNQ	DNQ	DNQ			DNQ	DNQ	DNQ	DNQ	DNQ	DNQ	DNQ	DNQ	DNQ	DNQ	0
	(Belgium) Delbrassine	KTM	DNQ	DNQ	DNQ	DNQ	DNQ	DNQ	DNQ	DNQ	DNQ	DNQ	DNQ	DNQ					0
	(Israel) Sella	Husqvarna			DNQ	DNQ	DNQ	DNQ	DNQ	DNQ	DNQ	DNQ			DNQ	DNQ	DNQ	DNQ	0
	(Belgium) Vander Auwera	KTM	DNQ	DNQ	DNQ	DNQ					DNQ	DNQ	DNQ	DNQ	DNQ	DNQ			0
	(Germany) Greutmann	Husqvarna			DNQ	DNQ			DNQ	DNQ	DNQ	DNQ	DNQ	DNQ	DNQ	DNQ			0
	(Spain) Monne	KTM							DNQ	DNQ	DNQ	DNQ	DNQ	DNQ	DNQ	DNQ	DNQ	DNQ	0
	(Spain) Bicalho	KTM	DNQ	DNQ	DNQ	DNQ			DNQ	DNQ	DNQ	DNQ							0
	(Netherlands) de Beer	Yamaha	DNQ	DNQ	DNQ	DNQ							DNQ	DNQ			DNQ	DNQ	0
	(France) Borgioli	KTM			DNQ	DNQ			DNQ	DNQ	DNQ	DNQ			DNQ	DNQ			0
	(Sweden) Flink	KTM	DNQ	DNQ	DNQ	DNQ	DNQ	DNQ											0
	(Switzerland) Elsener	Yamaha	DNQ	DNQ					DNQ	DNQ					DNQ	DNQ			0
	(Italy) Dal Bosco	KTM			DNQ	DNQ			DNQ	DNQ	DNQ	DNQ							0
	(Czech Republic) Venhoda	KTM			DNQ	DNQ			DNQ	DNQ			DNQ	DNQ					0
	(Italy) Palanca	Husqvarna			DNQ	DNQ			DNQ	DNQ					DNQ	DNQ			0
	(Czech Republic) Kraus	KTM			DNQ	DNQ			DNQ	DNQ					DNQ	DNQ			0
	(Lithuania) Zhilkin	KTM					DNQ	DNQ	DNQ	DNQ			DNQ	DNQ					0
	(Czech Republic) Vetrovsky	KTM											DNQ	DNQ	DNQ	DNQ	DNQ	DNQ	0
	(Estonia) Pihlak	KTM	DNQ	DNQ	DNQ	DNQ													0
	(Germany) Thünecke	KTM	DNQ	DNQ	DNQ	DNQ													0
	(France) Boldrini	KTM	DNQ	DNQ	DNQ	DNQ													0
	(Poland) Dabrowski	KTM	DNQ	DNQ	DNQ	DNQ													0
	(South Africa) Scott	KTM	DNQ	DNQ					DNQ	DNQ									0
	(France) Fabre	Husqvarna			DNQ	DNQ							DNQ	DNQ					0
	(Italy) Barbaglia	Husqvarna			DNQ	DNQ							DNQ	DNQ					0
	(Sweden) Ruth	KTM					DNQ	DNQ					DNQ	DNQ					0
	(Russia) A. Dyadichkin	KTM					DNQ	DNQ					DNQ	DNQ					0
	(Russia) G. Dyadichkin	KTM					DNQ	DNQ					DNQ	DNQ					0
	(Denmark) Kleemann	KTM							DNQ	DNQ			DNQ	DNQ					0
	(Belgium) Derboven	KTM							DNQ	DNQ			DNQ	DNQ					0
	(Belgium) Bonnewijn	Yamaha							DNQ	DNQ			DNQ	DNQ					0
	(Portugal) Marques	Husqvarna							DNQ	DNQ			DNQ	DNQ					0
	(Spain) Tomas	KTM									DNQ	DNQ			DNQ	DNQ			0
	(Netherlands) De Weerd	Husqvarna											DNQ	DNQ	DNQ	DNQ			0
	(United Kingdom) Gasson	TM	DNQ	DNQ															0
	(Sweden) Persson	KTM	DNQ	DNQ															0
	(United Kingdom) Ingham	Yamaha	DNQ	DNQ															0
	(Sweden) Holm	KTM	DNQ	DNQ															0
	(United Kingdom) Beresford	TM	DNQ	DNQ															0
	(United Kingdom) McNichol	Husqvarna	DNQ	DNQ															0
	(United Kingdom) White	Husqvarna	DNQ	DNQ															0
	(Italy) Roncoli	Husqvarna			DNQ	DNQ													0
	(Italy) Dusi	KTM			DNQ	DNQ													0
	(United Kingdom) Carter	KTM			DNQ	DNQ													0
	(Italy) Riolo	Husqvarna			DNQ	DNQ													0
	(Italy) Moscatelli	Yamaha			DNQ	DNQ													0
	(Czech Republic) Stehlik	KTM			DNQ	DNQ													0
	(Latvia) Pumpurs	Yamaha					DNQ	DNQ											0
	(Belarus) Volovich	KTM					DNQ	DNQ											0
	(Russia) Frolov	KTM					DNQ	DNQ											0
	(Sweden) Aminne-Karlsson	Yamaha					DNQ	DNQ											0
	(Russia) Voronkov	KTM					DNQ	DNQ											0
	(Sweden) Boberg	KTM					DNQ	DNQ											0
	(Russia) Sychev	Yamaha					DNQ	DNQ											0
	(Russia) Mangushev	Husqvarna					DNQ	DNQ											0
	(Sweden) Gredinger	Husqvarna					DNQ	DNQ											0
	(Germany) Ludwig	KTM							DNQ	DNQ									0
	(Germany) Rehberg	KTM							DNQ	DNQ									0
	(Germany) Fiedler	Husqvarna							DNQ	DNQ									0
	(Netherlands) Van Ham	KTM							DNQ	DNQ									0
	(Belgium) Houyon	Husqvarna							DNQ	DNQ									0
	(France) Grajwoda	Husqvarna									DNQ	DNQ							0
	(France) Madoulaud	Husqvarna									DNQ	DNQ							0
	(France) Pinson	KTM									DNQ	DNQ							0
	(France) Vial	Yamaha									DNQ	DNQ							0
	(Netherlands) Wennekes	Husqvarna											DNQ	DNQ					0
	(Sweden) Gabrielsson Tell	Husqvarna											DNQ	DNQ					0
	(Netherlands) Simons	Yamaha											DNQ	DNQ					0
	(Belgium) Daniels	KTM											DNQ	DNQ					0
	(Spain) Rosell	Yamaha											DNQ	DNQ					0
	(Netherlands) Danen	Yamaha											DNQ	DNQ					0
	(Switzerland) Schudel	KTM													DNQ	DNQ			0
	(Belgium) Moors	KTM													DNQ	DNQ			0
Pos	Rider	Bike	NED (Netherlands)		TRE (Italy)		LAT (Latvia)		GER (Germany)		FRA (France)		BEL (Belgium)		SUI (Switzerland)		NED (Netherlands)		Points

Colour	Result
Gold	Winner
Silver	Second place
Bronze	Third place
Green	Points classification
Blue	Non-points classification
Blue	Non-classified finish (NC)
Purple	Retired, not classified (Ret)
Red	Did not qualify (DNQ)
Red	Did not pre-qualify (DNPQ)
Black	Disqualified (DSQ)
White	Did not start (DNS)
White	Withdrew (WD)
White	Race cancelled (C)
Blank	Did not practice (DNP)
Blank	Did not arrive (DNA)
Blank	Excluded (EX)

=== Manufacturers Championship ===
Pos	Bike	NED (Netherlands)		TRE (Italy)		LAT (Latvia)		GER (Germany)		FRA (France)		BEL (Belgium)		SUI (Switzerland)		NED (Netherlands)		Points
1	KTM	1	1	1	1	2	1	1	2	2	2	3	3	1	2	1	1	375
2	Husqvarna	4	2	14	10	6	3	2	1	4	1	2	1	3	1	2	7	311
3	Yamaha	5	7	6	6	1	7	4	6	1	6	1	13	2	4	3	3	285
4	TM	DNQ	DNQ															0
Pos	Bike	NED (Netherlands)		TRE (Italy)		LAT (Latvia)		GER (Germany)		FRA (France)		BEL (Belgium)		SUI (Switzerland)		NED (Netherlands)		Points

== EMX300 ==
A 6-round calendar for the 2018 season was announced on 25 October 2017. EMX300 is for riders competing on 2-stroke motorcycles between 200-300cc.

=== EMX300 ===
Round	Date	Grand Prix	Location	Race 1 Winner	Race 2 Winner	Round Winner	Report
1	18 March	Netherlands	Valkenswaard	(Belgium) Greg Smets	(Belgium) Greg Smets	(Belgium) Greg Smets	Report
2	25 March	Spain	Redsand	(Netherlands) Mike Kras	(Netherlands) Mike Kras	(Netherlands) Mike Kras	Report
3	1 May	Russia	Orlyonok	(Estonia) Andero Lusbo	(United Kingdom) Brad Anderson	(United Kingdom) Brad Anderson	Report
4	3 June	Great Britain	Matterley Basin	(United Kingdom) Brad Anderson	(Estonia) Andero Lusbo	(United Kingdom) Brad Anderson	Report
5	22 July	Czech Republic	Loket	(Germany) Dennis Ullrich	(Netherlands) Mike Kras	(Netherlands) Mike Kras	Report
6	26 August	Bulgaria	Sevlievo	(Netherlands) Mike Kras	(United Kingdom) Brad Anderson	(United Kingdom) Brad Anderson	Report
7	30 September	Italy	Imola	(Netherlands) Mike Kras	(Netherlands) Mike Kras	(Netherlands) Mike Kras	Report

=== Entry list ===
Team	Constructor	No	Rider	Rounds
Verde Substance KTM	KTM	1	(United Kingdom) Brad Anderson	All
GL12 Racing KTM	KTM	2	(United Kingdom) James Dunn	1
GL12 Racing KTM	KTM	55	(Netherlands) Mike Kras	All
	Husqvarna	4	(Italy) Pietro Salina	7
	KTM	5	(United Kingdom) Billy King	4
JRD MX Team	Husqvarna	10	(Netherlands) Tim Mulder	1–2, 4–5, 7
Fountain Builders	Yamaha	11	(United Kingdom) Ben Putnam	4
	Husqvarna	14	(Netherlands) Juell Joop Peeters	1
Fern Plant Hire	KTM	15	(United Kingdom) Bradley Wheeler	1–2, 4
3C Racing CM Team	Yamaha	21	(Italy) Marco Lolli	7
Bikesport KTM	KTM	28	(United Kingdom) John Robson	1, 4
Hutten Metaal Yamaha Racing	Yamaha	31	(Netherlands) Joey Bak	5
Motorshop Desmet	KTM	33	(Belgium) Gordano Natale	1–2
Samarbetspartners	Yamaha	40	(Sweden) Jonatan Mattsson	1
Anquety FL Racing Team	Husqvarna	42	(Belgium) Tim Louis	1–2, 4–5, 7
	KTM	46	(Russia) Egor Skorobogatov	3
Denicol KTM	KTM	53	(Belgium) Greg Smets	All
Cheddar MX Store	KTM	54	(United Kingdom) Corey Hockey	4
	KTM	57	(Belgium) Mathias Plessers	1–2, 4
A1M Husqvarna	Husqvarna	62	(Estonia) Andero Lusbo	All
Hitachi Construction KTM UK	KTM	63	(United Kingdom) Oliver Benton	4
	Yamaha	78	(Netherlands) Tom Meijer	1–2
MDM Racing	KTM	82	(Italy) Manuel Beconcini	7
	KTM	85	(Italy) Andrea Storti	5
	KTM	88	(Belgium) Joey Smet	1
Lakerveld Racing	Yamaha	89	(Netherlands) Rico Lommers	1, 5, 7
Lakerveld Racing	Yamaha	822	(Netherlands) Mike Bolink	1, 5, 7
I-Fly JK Yamaha	Yamaha	91	(United Kingdom) Charlie Putnam	2, 4
I-Fly JK Yamaha	Yamaha	118	(United Kingdom) Jaydon Murphy	4–5
I-Fly JK Yamaha	Yamaha	371	(Italy) Manuel Iacopi	All
Team Ecomaxx	KTM	92	(Netherlands) Youri van't Ende	1–2, 5–7
	Husqvarna	98	(Belgium) Erik Willems	All
KRTZ Motorsport	Gas Gas	101	(Czech Republic) Vaclav Kovar	All
KRTZ Motorsport	KTM	311	(Czech Republic) Marek Nespor	1–3, 5–7
Maddii Racing Team	Husqvarna	107	(Italy) Mattia Guadagnini	7
Team 505 Racing	KTM	109	(Italy) Riccardo Cencioni	1–2, 4–7
Team 505 Racing	KTM	939	(Italy) Michele Cencioni	1–2, 4–7
Orion Racing Team	KTM	111	(Czech Republic) Petr Bartos	1, 4–5
	Husqvarna	121	(Netherlands) Mitchel Essenburg	1, 5
Hofstede MX Team	Husqvarna	122	(Netherlands) Ralph Slager	5, 7
TM ČR	TM	123	(Czech Republic) Marek Sukup	5
	KTM	129	(Switzerland) Steve Gailland	7
Pope Racing	KTM	131	(United Kingdom) Henry Siddiqui	1–2, 4
	KTM	133	(Russia) Ignatii Lopatin	3
Team Mototechnica	KTM	135	(Italy) Alessandro Lentini	7
Team GBO Motorsports	KTM	136	(Italy) Matteo Bonini	7
	Honda	142	(Russia) Iurii Lukash	3
	KTM	147	(Belgium) Justin Geyskens	1–4
DAM Racing	KTM	148	(Belgium) Thomas Delvoy	1
2-Stroke Revolution Racing	KTM	149	(Germany) Dennis Ullrich	5
JTX Racing Team	KTM	150	(Netherlands) Sven Te Dorsthorst	1
JTX Racing Team	KTM	365	(Denmark) Nikolaj Skovgaard	1
	KTM	155	(Russia) Nikolay Kornev	3
Apico Putoline Husqvarna	Husqvarna	172	(United Kingdom) Robert Holyoake	1–4
Galvin MX Team	Yamaha	188	(Netherlands) Joshua van der Linden	1–2
Janssen Racing Products	KTM	192	(Netherlands) John Cuppen	1–2, 4–5, 7
KSM Racing Team	KTM	198	(Finland) Mikael Kaipanen	1
IDS Chambers KTM	KTM	200	(United Kingdom) Phil Mercer	1–2
	Yamaha	217	(Netherlands) Teun Cooymans	1, 4–5
	Yamaha	218	(Italy) Gianfranco Mattara	7
VanDeLaarRacing.com	Yamaha	228	(Netherlands) Kay Ebben	1, 5
	Husqvarna	233	(Netherlands) Lars Rietman	1
	KTM	238	(Belgium) Tallon Verhelst	1–2, 4–6
	Yamaha	239	(Czech Republic) Patrik Liska	5, 7
Mellendijk Motorparts	Husqvarna	253	(Netherlands) Damien van Erkelens	1
	Husqvarna	270	(France) Clarence Chovet	1–2, 5–6
RVH Tuning	KTM	288	(Belgium) Ronny van Hove	1–2, 5–7
KTM Zauner Racing	KTM	319	(Austria) Christoph Zeintl	5
Langmead Construction	KTM	333	(United Kingdom) Ashley Greedy	4–5
	Honda	334	(Netherlands) Kevin Kieft	1, 5
	KTM	385	(Italy) Sebastian Zenato	5–6
Hobby Motor	KTM	397	(Italy) Yuri Pasqualini	7
Schepers Racing	KTM	424	(Netherlands) Wesley Schepers	7
Team Hardcross	Husqvarna	444	(Spain) Daniel Tinoco	2
	Honda	510	(Italy) Nicola Matteucci	7
	KTM	531	(Italy) Francesco Galligari	1–3
	KTM	532	(Netherlands) Mikey Adams	1–2
	KTM	537	(Netherlands) Damian Wedage	1–2, 4–5, 7
Schleenbecker-moto	KTM	550	(Germany) Patrik Bender	5
Buitenhuis Racing	Yamaha	555	(Netherlands) Max Schwarte	5
Tony Maunders Racing	Yamaha	600	(United Kingdom) Jamie Skuse	4
	Husqvarna	699	(Italy) Willy Allegro	7
RMJ Academy	Husqvarna	704	(United Kingdom) Ashley Wilde	4
	KTM	715	(Netherlands) Jaap Janssen	1, 4–5
	KTM	725	(San Marino) Andrea Gorini	5, 7
	Yamaha	731	(Italy) Andrea Vendruscolo	7
Pater MX Team	KTM	911	(Netherlands) Henk Pater	1–2, 5
TLB Racing	Yamaha	946	(Belgium) Daymond Martens	1–2, 5
MGR Motocross Team	KTM	974	(Italy) Mario Tamai	5, 7
Motos Da Silva	TM	991	(Spain) Alonso Sanchez	2

=== Riders Championship ===
Pos	Rider	Bike	NED (Netherlands)		ESP (Spain)		RUS (Russia)		GBR (United Kingdom)		CZE (Czech Republic)		BUL (Bulgaria)		ITA (Italy)		Points
1	(United Kingdom) Anderson	KTM	3	2	6	3	3	1	1	2	8	2	2	1	5	9	279
2	(Netherlands) Kras	KTM	2	3	1	1	5	2	Ret	Ret	2	1	1	2	1	1	274
3	(Belgium) Willems	Husqvarna	15	9	8	6	4	5	8	4	3	7	3	4	2	4	223
4	(Estonia) Lusbo	Husqvarna	13	6	3	5	1	4	5	1	9	5	6	6	Ret	3	221
5	(Czech Republic) Kovar	Gas Gas	30	18	7	8	2	3	2	3	5	3	4	3	Ret	2	210
6	(Belgium) Smets	KTM	1	1	5	2	DNS	7	6	6	10	11	9	9	12	11	196
7	(Italy) Iacopi	Yamaha	11	10	2	7	7	6	4	Ret	16	14	5	5	4	7	180
8	(Netherlands) van't Ende	KTM	9	5	10	10					11	22	7	7	14	10	106
9	(Italy) M. Cencioni	KTM	29	20	13	17			11	12	33	Ret	8	8	10	12	78
10	(Belgium) Louis	Husqvarna	14	16	11	12			15	10	14	Ret			13	16	68
11	(Belgium) Verhelst	KTM	20	15	9	13			16	9	17	19	15	15			62
12	(Belgium) Martens	Yamaha	7	Ret	15	9					12	10					52
13	(Czech Republic) Nespor	KTM	DNQ	DNQ	19	21	9	9			28	27	11	10	24	26	47
14	(Germany) Ullrich	KTM									1	6					40
15	(Czech Republic) Bartos	KTM	19	27					14	15	7	12					38
16	(Czech Republic) Liska	Yamaha									6	8			20	13	37
17	(Italy) Guadagnini	Husqvarna													3	5	36
18	(United Kingdom) Wilde	Husqvarna							3	5							36
19	(Czech Republic) Sukup	TM									4	4					36
20	(Spain) Sanchez	TM			4	4											36
21	(United Kingdom) Dunn	KTM	4	4													36
22	(Netherlands) Cuppen	KTM	Ret	19	16	16			12	13	18	18			22	24	35
23	(Netherlands) van der Linden	Yamaha	10	8	Ret	11											34
24	(Belgium) Plessers	KTM	5	Ret	14	14			20	22							31
25	(United Kingdom) Greedy	KTM							9	7	Ret	16					31
26	(Italy) R. Cencioni	KTM	33	32	18	22			17	20	32	23	10	12	18	21	31
27	(Italy) Pasqualini	KTM													6	6	30
28	(Netherlands) Ebben	Yamaha	17	7							Ret	9					30
29	(United Kingdom) Holyoake	Husqvarna	18	14	Ret	DNS	10	12	28	Ret							30
30	(Russia) Lopatin	KTM					6	8									28
31	(Italy) Lolli	Yamaha													7	8	27
32	(United Kingdom) B. Putnam	Yamaha							7	8							27
33	(Italy) Tamai	KTM									13	15			9	Ret	26
34	(Netherlands) Meijer	Yamaha	6	Ret	12	Ret											24
35	(Russia) Kornev	KTM					8	11									23
36	(Denmark) Skovgaard	KTM	8	12													22
37	(Belgium) Geyskens	KTM	DNQ	33	27	26	11	10	Ret	27							21
38	(Italy) Beconcini	KTM													8	15	19
39	(Belgium) van Hove	KTM	28	31	20	20					34	26	12	13	30	32	19
40	(Netherlands) Wedage	KTM	12	23	17	15			23	21	Ret	24			25	22	19
41	(Italy) Zenato	KTM									DSQ	DSQ	14	11			17
42	(Italy) Galligari	KTM	DNQ	DNQ	Ret	29	12	13									17
43	(San Marino) Gorini	KTM									19	21			11	17	16
44	(United Kingdom) Siddiqui	KTM	DNQ	DNQ	26	24			13	14							15
45	(France) Chovet	Husqvarna	DNQ	DNQ	25	28					DNQ	DNQ	13	14			15
46	(Russia) Lukash	Honda					13	14									15
47	(Netherlands) Slager	Husqvarna									15	35			16	18	14
48	(United Kingdom) Skuse	Yamaha							10	19							13
49	(United Kingdom) Hockey	Yamaha							21	11							10
50	(Belgium) Natale	KTM	22	11	Ret	DNS											10
51	(Belgium) Smet	KTM	16	17													9
52	(Germany) Bender	KTM									24	13					8
53	(Netherlands) Te Dorsthorst	KTM	26	13													8
54	(Italy) Vendruscolo	Yamaha													15	19	8
55	(Italy) Bonini	KTM													Ret	14	7
56	(Russia) Skorobogatov	KTM					14	DNS									7
57	(United Kingdom) C. Putnam	Yamaha			Ret	23			19	16							7
58	(Italy) Lentini	KTM													17	20	5
59	(Netherlands) Lommers	Yamaha	23	24							21	17			26	28	4
60	(Netherlands) Janssen	KTM	Ret	26					25	17	27	Ret					4
61	(United Kingdom) Benton	KTM							22	18							3
62	(Netherlands) Pater	KTM	24	30	23	18					36	32					3
63	(United Kingdom) King	KTM							18	24							3
64	(Netherlands) Adams	KTM	Ret	25	Ret	19											2
65	(Italy) Mattara	Yamaha													19	27	2
66	(Netherlands) Essenburg	Husqvarna	Ret	21							20	20					2
	(Netherlands) Schepers	KTM													21	23	0
	(United Kingdom) Wheeler	KTM	DNQ	DNQ	21	27			27	25							0
	(Finland) Kaipanen	KTM	21	28													0
	(Netherlands) Mulder	Husqvarna	DNQ	DNQ	22	25			29	28	37	34			29	33	0
	(Netherlands) van Erkelens	Husqvarna	27	22													0
	(Netherlands) Bak	Yamaha									22	Ret					0
	(Austria) Zeintl	KTM									23	25					0
	(Italy) Matteucci	Honda													23	25	0
	(United Kingdom) Robson	KTM	Ret	Ret					26	23							0
	(United Kingdom) Murphy	Yamaha							24	Ret	30	28					0
	(Spain) Tinoco	Husqvarna			24	30											0
	(United Kingdom) Mercer	KTM	25	29	Ret	Ret											0
	(Italy) Storti	KTM									25	30					0
	(Netherlands) Cooymans	Yamaha	DNQ	DNQ					30	26	35	33					0
	(Netherlands) Schwarte	Yamaha									26	DNS					0
	(Italy) Salina	Husqvarna													27	30	0
	(Italy) Allegro	Husqvarna													28	31	0
	(Netherlands) Kieft	Honda	31	35							31	29					0
	(Netherlands) Bolink	Yamaha	Ret	DNS							29	31					0
	(Switzerland) Gailland	KTM													Ret	29	0
	(Netherlands) Rietman	Husqvarna	32	34													0
	(Sweden) Mattsson	Yamaha	Ret	Ret													0
	(Netherlands) Peeters	Husqvarna	DNQ	DNQ													0
	(Belgium) Delvoy	KTM	DNQ	DNQ													0
Pos	Rider	Bike	NED (Netherlands)		ESP (Spain)		RUS (Russia)		GBR (United Kingdom)		CZE (Czech Republic)		BUL (Bulgaria)		ITA (Italy)		Points

=== Manufacturers Championship ===
Pos	Bike	NED (Netherlands)		ESP (Spain)		RUS (Russia)		GBR (United Kingdom)		CZE (Czech Republic)		BUL (Bulgaria)		ITA (Italy)		Points
1	KTM	1	1	1	1	3	1	1	2	1	1	1	1	1	1	342
2	Husqvarna	13	6	3	5	1	4	3	1	3	5	3	4	2	3	263
3	Yamaha	6	7	2	7	7	6	4	8	6	8	5	5	4	7	217
4	Gas Gas	30	18	7	8	2	3	2	3	5	3	4	3	Ret	2	210
5	TM			4	4					4	4					72
6	Honda	31	35			13	14			31	29			23	25	15
Pos	Bike	NED (Netherlands)		ESP (Spain)		RUS (Russia)		GBR (United Kingdom)		CZE (Czech Republic)		BUL (Bulgaria)		ITA (Italy)		Points

== EMX85 ==
A 1-round calendar for the 2018 season was announced on 25 October 2017. EMX85 is for riders competing on 2-stroke motorcycles of 85cc.

=== EMX85 ===
Round	Date	Grand Prix	Location	Race 1 Winner	Race 2 Winner	Round Winner	Report
1	22 July	Czech Republic	Loket	(South Africa) Camden McLellan	(Netherlands) Kay de Wolf	(South Africa) Camden McLellan	Report

=== Participants ===
Riders qualify for the championship by finishing in the top 10 in one of the 4 regional 85cc championships.

No	Rider	Motorcycle
6	(Croatia) Patrik Ujcic	KTM
9	(Croatia) Luka Kunic	Yamaha
14	(Hungary) Viktor Varro	Husqvarna
21	(Hungary) Bence Pergel	KTM
40	(Hungary) Laszlo Tecsi	KTM
49	(Greece) Marios Kanakis	KTM
72	(Belgium) Liam Everts	KTM
200	(Switzerland) Luca Diserens	KTM
208	(Italy) Andrea Viano	KTM
230	(France) Enzo Casat	Husqvarna
247	(France) Xavier Cazal	Husqvarna
252	(Spain) Raul Sanchez	KTM
277	(France) Baptiste Bordes	KTM
278	(France) Axel Louis	KTM
294	(Italy) Valerio Lata	KTM
329	(France) Saad Soulimani	Husqvarna
339	(Italy) Alberto Ladini	KTM
373	(Spain) Edgar Canet	KTM
398	(Italy) Matteo Russi	KTM
407	(South Africa) Camden McLellan	KTM
408	(Netherlands) Scott Smulders	KTM
422	(Netherlands) Kay Karssemakers	Husqvarna
431	(Czech Republic) Tomas Pikart	KTM
450	(Norway) Hakon Osterhagen	KTM
484	(Netherlands) Dave Kooiker	Yamaha
514	(Netherlands) Kay de Wolf	KTM
519	(Sweden) Teddy Jondell	KTM
526	(Denmark) Tobias Caprani	KTM
532	(Germany) Constantin Piller	KTM
535	(Czech Republic) Radek Vetrovsky	KTM
540	(Germany) Nick Domann	KTM
572	(Netherlands) Cas Valk	Yamaha
654	(Estonia) Mikk Martin Lohmus	KTM
690	(Estonia) Tristan Uiga	Husqvarna
715	(Estonia) Romeo Karu	KTM
740	(Estonia) Martin Michelis	KTM
743	(Latvia) Roberts Lūsis	KTM
747	(Russia) Aleksey Orlov	KTM
765	(Latvia) Edvards Bidzāns	Husqvarna
772	(Latvia) Kārlis Reišulis	KTM
795	(Russia) Daniil Kesov	KTM

=== Riders Championship ===
Pos	Rider	Motorcycle	CZE (Czech Republic)		Points
1	(South Africa) Camden McLellan	KTM	1	2	47
2	(Netherlands) Kay de Wolf	KTM	6	1	40
3	(Belgium) Liam Everts	KTM	2	4	40
4	(Netherlands) Kay Karssemakers	Husqvarna	5	3	36
5	(Spain) Raul Sanchez	KTM	3	8	33
6	(Netherlands) Dave Kooiker	Yamaha	7	6	29
7	(Czech Republic) Radek Vetrovsky	KTM	10	5	27
8	(France) Saad Soulimani	Husqvarna	12	7	23
9	(Latvia) Edvards Bidzāns	Husqvarna	8	11	23
10	(Italy) Valerio Lata	KTM	14	9	19
11	(Germany) Constantin Piller	KTM	4	Ret	18
12	(Italy) Andrea Viano	KTM	9	16	17
13	(Netherlands) Scott Smulders	KTM	11	15	16
14	(Germany) Nick Domann	KTM	26	10	11
15	(Norway) Hakon Osterhagen	KTM	24	12	9
16	(Czech Republic) Tomas Pikart	KTM	15	18	9
17	(France) Xavier Cazal	Husqvarna	23	13	8
18	(Denmark) Tobias Caprani	KTM	13	23	8
19	(Italy) Matteo Russi	KTM	22	14	7
20	(France) Enzo Casat	Husqvarna	16	24	5
21	(Spain) Edgar Canet	KTM	21	17	4
22	(Italy) Alberto Ladini	KTM	17	21	4
23	(France) Baptiste Bordes	KTM	20	19	3
24	(Latvia) Kārlis Reišulis	KTM	19	20	3
25	(Netherlands) Cas Valk	Yamaha	18	22	3
	(Hungary) Laszlo Tecsi	KTM	29	25	0
	(Estonia) Romeo Karu	KTM	25	37	0
	(Sweden) Teddy Jondell	KTM	27	26	0
	(Russia) Daniil Kesov	KTM	30	27	0
	(Estonia) Martin Michelis	KTM	28	28	0
	(Hungary) Bence Pergel	KTM	34	29	0
	(Estonia) Mikk Martin Lohmus	KTM	31	30	0
	(Croatia) Patrik Ujcic	KTM	32	31	0
	(Hungary) Viktor Varro	Husqvarna	38	32	0
	(Russia) Aleksey Orlov	KTM	33	33	0
	(Croatia) Luka Kunic	Yamaha	35	34	0
	(Estonia) Tristan Uiga	Husqvarna	37	35	0
	(Greece) Marios Kanakis	KTM	36	36	0
	(Switzerland) Luca Diserens	KTM	Ret	DNS	0
	(Latvia) Roberts Lūsis	KTM	DNS	DNS	0
Pos	Rider	Motorcycle	CZE (Czech Republic)		Points

Colour	Result
Gold	Winner
Silver	Second place
Bronze	Third place
Green	Points classification
Blue	Non-points classification
Blue	Non-classified finish (NC)
Purple	Retired, not classified (Ret)
Red	Did not qualify (DNQ)
Red	Did not pre-qualify (DNPQ)
Black	Disqualified (DSQ)
White	Did not start (DNS)
White	Withdrew (WD)
White	Race cancelled (C)
Blank	Did not practice (DNP)
Blank	Did not arrive (DNA)
Blank	Excluded (EX)

== EMX65 ==
A 1-round calendar for the 2018 season was announced on 25 October 2017. EMX65 is for riders competing on 2-stroke motorcycles of 65cc.

=== EMX65 ===
Round	Date	Grand Prix	Location	Race 1 Winner	Race 2 Winner	Round Winner	Report
1	22 July	Czech Republic	Loket	(Netherlands) Damian Knuiman	(Italy) Brando Rispoli	(Italy) Brando Rispoli	Report

=== Participants ===
Riders qualify for the championship by finishing in the top 10 in one of the 4 regional 85cc championships.

No	Rider	Motorcycle
2	(Hungary) Gergo Grosz	KTM
5	(Croatia) Dino Loncar	Kawasaki
11	(Romania) Zoltan Ordog	Husqvarna
26	(Hungary) Adam Horvath	KTM
27	(Israel) Ofir Tzemach	Husqvarna
88	(Croatia) Simun Ivandic	Yamaha
201	(Italy) Brando Rispoli	KTM
247	(Italy) Alessandro Gaspari	KTM
268	(Czech Republic) Jan Janout	KTM
286	(Spain) Joel Canadas	KTM
323	(Slovenia) Jaka Peklaj	KTM
386	(Spain) Elias Escandell	Husqvarna
388	(Spain) David Benitez	KTM
394	(Italy) Patrick Busatto	Yamaha
400	(Netherlands) Lotte van Drunen	Husqvarna
411	(Netherlands) Damian Knuiman	KTM
417	(Netherlands) Jayson van Drunen	Yamaha
423	(United Kingdom) Shaun Mahoney	Husqvarna
427	(Germany) Niklas Ohm	KTM
433	(Denmark) Jakob Frandsen	KTM
447	(Denmark) Jakob Madsen	KTM
456	(Finland) Eelis Viemero	KTM
475	(Netherlands) Bradley Mesters	Husqvarna
479	(Czech Republic) Vitezslav Marek	KTM
488	(Germany) Aaron Kowatsch	Husqvarna
500	(Belgium) Douwe Van Mechgelen	Husqvarna
515	(Sweden) Anton Isaksson	Husqvarna
527	(Netherlands) Mick Kennedy	KTM
574	(Netherlands) Gyan Doensen	KTM
619	(Poland) Mikolaj Stasiak	KTM
621	(Poland) Piotr Kajrys	KTM
655	(Estonia) Romeo Pikand	KTM
699	(Latvia) Rolands Bogdanovičs	KTM
701	(Lithuania) Marius Adomaitis	KTM
710	(Estonia) Richard Paat	KTM
714	(Latvia) Markuss Ozoliņš	Husqvarna
727	(Estonia) Mark Peterson	KTM
747	(Russia) Semen Rybakov	KTM
749	(Russia) Ivan Dubatovkin	Husqvarna
772	(Latvia) Jānis Reišulis	Husqvarna

=== Riders Championship ===
Pos	Rider	Motorcycle	CZE (Czech Republic)		Points
1	(Italy) Brando Rispoli	KTM	5	1	41
2	(Denmark) Jakob Madsen	KTM	3	3	40
3	(Netherlands) Damian Knuiman	KTM	1	6	40
4	(Italy) Alessandro Gaspari	KTM	8	2	35
5	(Netherlands) Bradley Mesters	Husqvarna	4	5	34
6	(Czech Republic) Vitezslav Marek	KTM	7	7	28
7	(Latvia) Jānis Reišulis	Husqvarna	6	8	28
8	(Czech Republic) Jan Janout	KTM	14	4	25
9	(Sweden) Anton Isaksson	Husqvarna	10	9	23
10	(Netherlands) Lotte van Drunen	Husqvarna	9	11	22
11	(Slovenia) Jaka Peklaj	KTM	2	37	22
12	(Finland) Eelis Viemero	KTM	15	10	17
13	(Spain) Elias Escandell	Husqvarna	16	14	12
14	(Germany) Aaron Kowatsch	Husqvarna	12	18	12
15	(Russia) Semen Rybakov	KTM	11	20	11
16	(Spain) David Benitez	KTM	Ret	12	9
17	(Netherlands) Gyan Doensen	KTM	24	13	8
18	(Latvia) Markuss Ozoliņš	Husqvarna	13	29	8
19	(Italy) Patrick Busatto	Yamaha	Ret	15	6
20	(Estonia) Romeo Pikand	KTM	23	16	5
21	(Germany) Nicklas Ohm	KTM	28	17	4
22	(Russia) Ivan Dubatovkin	Husqvarna	17	25	4
23	(Netherlands) Mick Kennedy	KTM	18	27	3
24	(Poland) Mikolaj Stasiak	KTM	25	19	2
25	(Netherlands) Jayson Van Drunen	Yamaha	19	Ret	2
26	(Denmark) Jakob Frandsen	KTM	20	26	1
	(Spain) Joel Canadas	KTM	21	22	0
	(United Kingdom) Shaun Mahoney	Husqvarna	27	21	0
	(Estonia) Richard Paat	KTM	22	24	0
	(Lithuania) Marius Adomaitis	KTM	29	23	0
	(Hungary) Adam Horvath	KTM	26	34	0
	(Estonia) Mark Peterson	KTM	31	28	0
	(Romania) Zoltan Ordog	Husqvarna	30	32	0
	(Latvia) Rolands Bogdanovičs	KTM	32	30	0
	(Belgium) Douwe Van Mechgelen	Husqvarna	37	31	0
	(Poland) Piotr Kajrys	KTM	34	33	0
	(Hungary) Gergo Grosz	KTM	33	Ret	0
	(Croatia) Simun Ivandic	Yamaha	36	35	0
	(Israel) Ofir Tzemach	Husqvarna	35	38	0
	(Croatia) Dino Loncar	Kawasaki	38	36	0
Pos	Rider	Motorcycle	CZE (Czech Republic)		Points

Colour	Result
Gold	Winner
Silver	Second place
Bronze	Third place
Green	Points classification
Blue	Non-points classification
Blue	Non-classified finish (NC)
Purple	Retired, not classified (Ret)
Red	Did not qualify (DNQ)
Red	Did not pre-qualify (DNPQ)
Black	Disqualified (DSQ)
White	Did not start (DNS)
White	Withdrew (WD)
White	Race cancelled (C)
Blank	Did not practice (DNP)
Blank	Did not arrive (DNA)
Blank	Excluded (EX)
