= Marc Trilles =

Spanish footballer

Personal information
- Full name: Marc Trilles Gil
- Date of birth: 8 August 1991 (age 35)
- Place of birth: Vilafamés, Spain
- Height: 1.87 m (6 ft 1 1/2 in)
- Position: Centre back

Team information
- Current team: Tarazona
- Number: 4

Youth career
- 1999–2005: Vall d'Alba
- 2005–2010: Castellón

Senior career*
Years	Team	Apps	(Gls)
2010–2011	Castellón B	9	(1)
2010–2014	Castellón	99	(3)
2014–2015	Borriol	27	(3)
2015–2017	Saguntino	62	(0)
2017–2020	Lleida Esportiu	69	(0)
2020–2023	Gimnàstic	54	(1)
2023–	Tarazona	93	(3)
- * Club domestic league appearances and goals as of 10 June 2026

Marc Trilles Gil (born 8 August 1991) is a Spanish footballer who plays as a central defender for Tarazona.
