= Vilafamés =

- Municipality and town
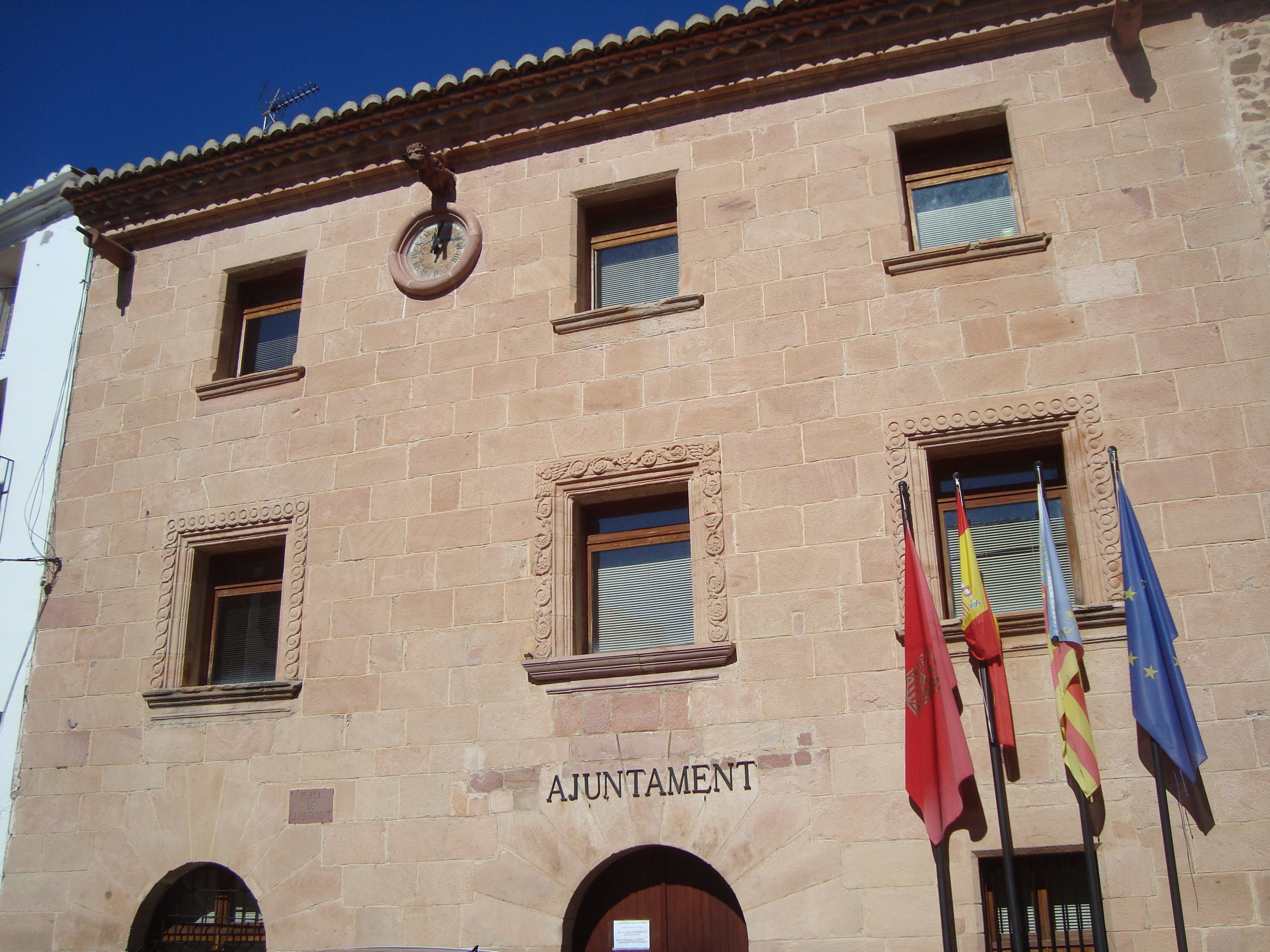
- Town hall

- Coat of arms

- Location within Province of Castellón Location within Valencian Community Location within Spain
- Coordinates: 40°6′45″N 0°3′14″W
- Country: Spain
- Autonomous community: Valencian Community
- Province: Castellón
- Comarca: Plana Alta

Area
  - Total: 70.4 km^{2} (27.2 sq mi)
- Elevation: 391 m (1,283 ft)

Population (2025-01-01)
  - Total: 1,962
  - Density: 27.9/km^{2} (72.2/sq mi)
- Time zone: UTC+1 (CET)
  - Summer (DST): UTC+2 (CEST)
- Postal code: 12192
- Website: https://vilafames.org

Vilafamés is a municipality located in the province of Castellón, Valencian Community, Spain.

== Notable people ==
- Marc Trilles, footballer
